= 2022–23 HockeyAllsvenskan season =

- League: HockeyAllsvenskan
- Sport: Ice hockey
- Duration: 23 September 2022 – 10 March 2023 (regular season)
- Number of teams: 14
- TV partner(s): C More
- First place: Modo Hockey
- Top scorer: Nick Schilkey (Björklöven)
- Promoted to SHL: Modo Hockey
- Relegated to lower division: HC Vita Hästen (bankruptcy)

HockeyAllsvenskan seasons
- ← 2021–22 2023–24 →

The 2022–23 HockeyAllsvenskan season was the 18th season of HockeyAllsvenskan, the second-highest professional ice hockey league in Sweden. The season consisted of 14 teams playing a regular season in which each team played each other team four times—twice at home and twice away. The regular season was followed by a series of promotion and relegation tournaments, with the teams finishing first through tenth participating in promotion playoffs, and those finishing thirteenth and fourteenth forced to requalify to avoid relegation to Hockeyettan.

For the 2022–23 season, there were four team movements. HV71 was promoted to the SHL as reigning 2022 HockeyAllsvenskan champions. IF Troja-Ljungby returned to Hockeyettan after one season in Allsvenskan. Longtime SHL club Djurgårdens IF was relegated to HockeyAllsvenskan.Östersunds IK won the 2022 Hockeyettan playoffs and was promoted.

== Participating teams ==
HockeyAllsvenskan team map

Team	City	Arena	Capacity
AIK	Stockholm	Hovet	8,094
Almtuna IS	Uppsala	Upplands Bilforum Arena	2,800
IF Björklöven	Umeå	Winpos Arena	5,400
Djurgårdens IF	Stockholm	Hovet	8,094
BIK Karlskoga	Karlskoga	Nobelhallen	6,300
Kristianstads IK	Kristianstad	Kristianstads ishall	2,300
Modo Hockey	Örnsköldsvik	Hägglunds Arena	7,350
Mora IK	Mora	Smidjegrav Arena	4,500
Södertälje SK	Södertälje	Scaniarinken	6,200
Tingsryds AIF	Tingsryd	Nelson Garden Arena	3,400
HC Vita Hästen	Norrköping	Himmelstalundshallen	4,280
Västerviks IK	Västervik	Plivit Arena	2,500
Västerås IK	Västerås	ABB Arena Nord	4,902
Östersunds IK	Östersund	Östersund Arena	2,700

== Regular season ==
=== Standings ===
Pos	Team	Pld	W	OTW	OTL	L	GF	GA	GD	Pts	Qualification or relegation
1	Modo Hockey	52	31	4	8	9	178	124	+54	109	Advance to the Quarterfinals
2	IF Björklöven	52	29	7	5	11	189	124	+65	106	Advance to the Quarterfinals
3	Mora IK	52	27	5	5	15	162	122	+40	96	Advance to the Quarterfinals
4	Djurgårdens IF	52	25	6	8	13	162	121	+41	95	Advance to the Quarterfinals
5	Södertälje SK	52	24	9	5	14	159	122	+37	95	Advance to the Quarterfinals
6	BIK Karlskoga	52	21	9	5	17	155	141	+14	86	Advance to the Quarterfinals
7	Almtuna IS	52	19	7	4	22	123	125	−2	75	Advance to the Eighth-finals
8	HC Vita Hästen (R)	52	18	1	13	20	135	146	−11	69	Advance to the Eighth-finals
9	Västerås IK	52	17	5	6	24	143	168	−25	67	Advance to the Eighth-finals
10	AIK	52	17	4	6	25	146	174	−28	65	Advance to the Eighth-finals
11	Kristianstads IK	52	15	6	6	25	128	152	−24	63	
12	Östersunds IK	52	16	4	3	29	112	165	−53	59	
13	Tingsryds AIF	52	13	6	7	26	119	169	−50	58	Advance to Play Out
14	Västerviks IK	52	9	10	2	31	113	171	−58	49	Advance to Play Out

Updated to match(es) played on 10 March 2023. Source: swehockey.se
(R) Relegated

=== Statistics ===
==== Scoring leaders ====
The following shows the top ten players who led the league in points, at the conclusion of matches played on 10 March 2023. If two or more skaters are tied (i.e. same number of points, goals and played games), all of the tied skaters are shown.

Player	Team	GP	G	A	Pts	+/–	PIM
(United States) Nick Schilkey	IF Björklöven	52	25	43	68	+12	26
(Sweden) Linus Videll	Södertälje SK	42	27	30	57	+13	8
(Sweden) Johan Persson	Mora IK	51	30	23	53	+17	14
(Sweden) Nikola Pasic	Södertälje SK	51	18	34	52	+9	14
(Sweden) David Bernhardt	Modo Hockey	52	19	32	51	+26	24
(United States) Scott Pooley	IF Björklöven	52	29	21	50	+18	14
(Sweden) Marcus Krüger	Djurgårdens IF	50	12	37	49	+22	36
(Sweden) Daniel Ljunggren	Mora IK	44	11	37	48	+10	12
(Sweden) Olle Liss	Djurgårdens IF	52	22	25	47	+24	24
(Sweden) Pontus Näsén	Modo Hockey	50	8	37	45	+16	8

==== Leading goaltenders ====
The following shows the top five goaltenders who led the league in goals against average, provided that they have played at least 40% of their team's minutes, at the conclusion of matches played on 10 March 2023.

Player	Team	GP	W	L	TOI	GA	SO	Sv%	GAA
(Sweden) Carl Lindbom	Djurgårdens IF	36	25	11	2166:43	67	7	92.98	1.86
(Latvia) Kristers Gudļevskis	Modo Hockey	39	27	11	2366:10	74	5	92.03	1.88
(Sweden) Andreas Ljunggren	Mora IK	26	14	11	1509:52	50	2	91.90	1.99
(Sweden) Viktor Andrén	Almtuna IS	35	19	15	2087:36	71	2	92.14	2.04
(Belarus) Nikita Tolopilo	Södertälje SK	45	28	17	2652:53	93	4	92.40	2.10

== Post-season ==
=== Playoff bracket ===
Eighth-finals; Swedish: Åttondelsfinal
7	Almtuna IS	0
10	AIK	2
8	HC Vita Hästen	0
9	Västerås IK	2

Quarterfinals; Swedish: Kvartsfinal
1	Modo Hockey	4
10	AIK	2
2	IF Björklöven	4
9	Västerås IK	1
3	Mora IK	4
5	Södertälje SK	2
4	Djurgårdens IF	4
6	BIK Karlskoga	0

Semifinals
1	Modo Hockey	4
3	Mora IK	0
(Pairings are re-seeded after the first and second round)
2	IF Björklöven	2
4	Djurgårdens IF	4

Finals
1	Modo Hockey	4
4	Djurgårdens IF	3

=== Eighth-finals ===
Teams 7–10 from the regular season will play best-of-three playoff series, where team 7 face team 10 and team 8 face team 9. In each series the higher-seeded team have home-ice advantage, playing at home for game 1 (plus 3 if necessary) while the lower-seeded team play at home for game 2. The winners move on to the quarterfinals.

==== Almtuna IS vs. AIK ====
12 March	AIK	5–2	Almtuna IS	Hovet	Recap

14 March	Almtuna IS	2–5	AIK	Upplands Bilforum Arena	Recap

AIK won series 2–0

==== HC Vita Hästen vs. Västerås IK ====
12 March	Västerås IK	4–3	Vita Hästen	ABB Arena Nord	Recap

14 March	Vita Hästen	1–2	Västerås IK	Himmelstalundshallen	Recap

Västerås IK won series 2–0

=== Quarterfinals ===
Teams 1–6 from the regular season, along with the winners of the eighth-finals, will play best-of-seven series, with the winners moving on to the semifinals. The highest-seeded team chose whether to play the second-lowest seed or the lowest seed. In each series the higher-seeded team has home-ice advantage, playing at home for games 1 and 2 (plus 5 and 7 if necessary) while the lower-seeded team plays at home for games 3 and 4 (plus 6 if necessary) The higher-seeded half of the teams chose their opponents, with the highest-seeded remaining team choosing at each step.

==== Modo Hockey vs. AIK ====
17 March	Modo Hockey	3–1	AIK	Hägglunds Arena	Recap

19 March	Modo Hockey	3–4	OT	AIK	Hägglunds Arena	Recap

21 March	AIK	3–4	Modo Hockey	Hovet	Recap

23 March	AIK	5–4	Modo Hockey	Hovet	Recap

25 March	Modo Hockey	8–3	AIK	Hägglunds Arena	Recap

27 March	AIK	2–4	Modo Hockey	Hovet	Recap

Modo Hockey won series 4–2

==== IF Björklöven vs. Västerås IK ====
17 March	IF Björklöven	4–1	Västerås IK	Winpos Arena	Recap

19 March	IF Björklöven	3–4	OT	Västerås IK	Winpos Arena	Recap

21 March	Västerås IK	1–2	IF Björklöven	ABB Arena Nord	Recap

23 March	Västerås IK	2–6	IF Björklöven	ABB Arena Nord	Recap

25 March	IF Björklöven	5–0	Västerås IK	Winpos Arena	Recap

IF Björklöven won series 4–1

==== Mora IK vs. Södertälje SK ====
18 March	Mora IK	4–2	Södertälje SK	Smidjegrav Arena	Recap

20 March	Mora IK	2–0	Södertälje SK	Smidjegrav Arena	Recap

22 March	Södertälje SK	3–1	Mora IK	Scaniarinken	Recap

24 March	Södertälje SK	3–2	Mora IK	Scaniarinken	Recap

26 March	Mora IK	4–3	Södertälje SK	Smidjegrav Arena	Recap

28 March	Södertälje SK	2–3	OT	Mora IK	Scaniarinken	Recap

Mora IK won series 4–2

==== Djurgårdens IF vs. BIK Karlskoga ====
18 March	Djurgårdens IF	4–1	BIK Karlskoga	Hovet	Recap

20 March	Djurgårdens IF	4–1	BIK Karlskoga	Hovet	Recap

22 March	BIK Karlskoga	0–3	Djurgårdens IF	Nobelhallen	Recap

24 March	BIK Karlskoga	3–6	Djurgårdens IF	Nobelhallen	Recap

Djurgårdens IF won series 4–0

=== Semifinals ===
The winners of the quarterfinals play best-of-seven series, with the winners moving on to the Finals. The highest-seeded team chose whether to play the second-lowest seed or the lowest seed. In each series the higher-seeded team has home-ice advantage, playing at home for games 1 and 2 (plus 5 and 7 if necessary) while the lower-seeded team plays at home for games 3 and 4 (plus 6 if necessary).

==== Modo Hockey vs. Mora IK ====
1 April	Modo Hockey	4–2	Mora IK	Hägglunds Arena	Recap

3 April	Modo Hockey	3–0	Mora IK	Hägglunds Arena	Recap

5 April	Mora IK	2–3	OT	Modo Hockey	Smidjegrav Arena	Recap

7 April	Mora IK	0–3	Modo Hockey	Smidjegrav Arena	Recap

Modo Hockey won series 4–0

==== IF Björklöven vs. Djurgårdens IF ====
2 April	IF Björklöven	3–2	OT	Djurgårdens IF	Winpos Arena	Recap

4 April	IF Björklöven	1–4	Djurgårdens IF	Winpos Arena	Recap

6 April	Djurgårdens IF	1–3	IF Björklöven	Hovet	Recap

8 April	Djurgårdens IF	5–4	IF Björklöven	Hovet	Recap

10 April	IF Björklöven	3–5	Djurgårdens IF	Winpos Arena	Recap

12 April	Djurgårdens IF	6–4	IF Björklöven	Hovet	Recap

Djurgårdens IF won series 4–2

=== Finals ===
The winners of the semifinals will play a best-of-seven series, with the winner being promoted to the Swedish Hockey League (SHL). The higher-seeded team has home-ice advantage, playing at home for games 1 and 2 (plus 5 and 7 if necessary) while the lower-seeded team play at home for games 3 and 4 (plus 6 if necessary).

==== Modo Hockey vs. Djurgårdens IF ====
16 April	Modo Hockey	2–1	OT	Djurgårdens IF	Hägglunds Arena	Recap

18 April	Modo Hockey	2–3	OT	Djurgårdens IF	Hägglunds Arena	Recap

21 April	Djurgårdens IF	1–2	OT	Modo Hockey	Hovet	Recap

23 April	Djurgårdens IF	6–7	Modo Hockey	Hovet	Recap

26 April	Modo Hockey	4–6	Djurgårdens IF	Hägglunds Arena	Recap

28 April	Djurgårdens IF	3–2	2OT	Modo Hockey	Hovet	Recap

30 April	Modo Hockey	4–0	Djurgårdens IF	Hägglunds Arena	Recap
Oscar Pettersson (2) – 5:47; Johan Södergran (4; PPG) – 11:20		First period	No scoring
Mikkel Aagaard (8) – 5:57; Johan Södergran (5) – 15:18		Second period	No scoring
No scoring		Third period	No scoring
Kristers Gudļevskis ( 26 saves / 26 shots )		Goalie stats	Jesper Myrenberg ( 15 saves / 18 shots ); Matthew Galajda ( 10 saves / 10 shots )

Modo Hockey won series 4–3

=== Play Out ===
Teams 13 and 14 from the regular season will play a best-of-seven series, with the winner remaining in HockeyAllsvenskan and the loser being relegated to Hockeyettan. The higher-seeded team has home-ice advantage, playing at home for games 1 and 2 (plus 5 if necessary) while the lower-seeded team plays at home for game 3 (plus 4 if necessary).

==== Tingsryds AIF vs. Västerviks IK ====
13 March	Tingsryds AIF	0–1	Västerviks IK	Nelson Garden Arena	Recap

15 March	Tingsryds AIF	4–1	Västerviks IK	Nelson Garden Arena	Recap

17 March	Västerviks IK	0–2	Tingsryds AIF	Plivit Arena	Recap

19 March	Västerviks IK	3–2	Tingsryds AIF	Plivit Arena	Recap

22 March	Tingsryds AIF	4–0	Västerviks IK	Nelson Garden Arena	Recap

24 March	Västerviks IK	0–2	Tingsryds AIF	Plivit Arena	Recap

Tingsryds AIF won series 4–2
