= 2021–22 HockeyAllsvenskan season =

- League: HockeyAllsvenskan
- Sport: Ice hockey
- Duration: 24 September 2021 – March 2022 (regular season)
- Number of teams: 14
- TV partner(s): C More
- First place: HV71
- Top scorer: Fredrik Forsberg (HV71)
- Promoted to SHL: HV71
- Relegated to Hockeyettan: IF Troja-Ljungby

HockeyAllsvenskan seasons
- ← 2020–21 2022–23 →

The 2021–22 HockeyAllsvenskan season was the 17th season that the second tier of Swedish ice hockey operated under that name. The series consists of 14 teams playing a regular season in which each team play each other team four times, twice at home and twice away. This is followed by a series of promotion and relegation tournaments, with the teams finishing first through tenth participating in promotion playoffs, and the teams finishing 13th and 14th forced to requalify to avoid relegation to the Hockeyettan.

== Participating teams ==
HockeyAllsvenskan team map

Team	City	Arena	Capacity
AIK	Stockholm	Hovet	8,094
Almtuna IS	Uppsala	Upplands Bilforum Arena	2,800
IF Björklöven	Umeå	A3 Arena	5,400
HV71	Jönköping	Husqvarna Garden	7,000
BIK Karlskoga	Karlskoga	Nobelhallen	6,300
Kristianstads IK	Kristianstad	Kristianstads ishall	2,300
Modo Hockey	Örnsköldsvik	Hägglunds Arena	7,350
Mora IK	Mora	Smidjegrav Arena	4,500
Södertälje SK	Södertälje	Scaniarinken	6,200
Tingsryds AIF	Tingsryd	Nelson Garden Arena	3,400
Troja-Ljungby	Ljungby	Ljungby Arena	3,500
HC Vita Hästen	Norrköping	Himmelstalundshallen	4,280
Västerviks IK	Västervik	Plivit Arena	2,500
Västerås IK	Västerås	ABB Arena Nord	4,902

== Regular season ==
=== Standings ===
Pos	Team	Pld	W	OTW	OTL	L	GF	GA	GD	Pts	Qualification or relegation
1	HV71	52	34	6	2	10	189	118	+71	116	Advance to the Quarterfinals
2	Modo Hockey	52	26	12	4	10	182	140	+42	106	Advance to the Quarterfinals
3	BIK Karlskoga	52	28	6	4	14	150	119	+31	100	Advance to the Quarterfinals
4	IF Björklöven	52	26	7	6	13	196	146	+50	98	Advance to the Quarterfinals
5	Västerås IK	52	25	6	1	20	164	136	+28	88	Advance to the Quarterfinals
6	Kristianstads IK	52	23	5	1	23	171	148	+23	80	Advance to the Quarterfinals
7	Mora IK	52	18	9	7	18	150	147	+3	79	Advance to the Eighth-finals
8	Västerviks IK	52	21	2	12	17	145	146	−1	79	Advance to the Eighth-finals
9	AIK	52	22	4	0	26	140	137	+3	74	Advance to the Eighth-finals
10	Tingsryds AIF	52	15	5	7	25	128	175	−47	62	Advance to the Eighth-finals
11	HC Vita Hästen	52	12	6	11	23	147	185	−38	59	
12	Almtuna IS	52	13	3	10	26	131	177	−46	55	
13	Södertälje SK	52	12	5	8	27	129	176	−47	54	Advance to Play Out
14	IF Troja-Ljungby (R)	52	8	5	8	31	119	191	−72	42	Advance to Play Out

Updated to match(es) played on 16 March 2022. Source: swehockey.se
(R) Relegated

=== Statistics ===
==== Scoring leaders ====
The following shows the top ten players who led the league in points, at the conclusion of matches played on 16 March 2022. If two or more skaters are tied (i.e. same number of points, goals and played games), all of the tied skaters are shown.

Player	Team	GP	G	A	Pts	+/–	PIM
(Sweden) Fredrik Forsberg	HV71	46	28	26	54	+12	6
(Sweden) Johan Persson	Mora IK	51	29	21	50	+9	4
(Sweden) Mikael Frycklynd	Västerås IK	44	16	34	50	+2	63
(Canada) Riley Woods	Modo Hockey	52	26	23	49	+7	35
(Sweden) Marcus Eriksson	HC Vita Hästen	51	16	33	49	+9	20
(Sweden) Daniel Ljunggren	Mora IK	48	4	45	49	+7	20
(Sweden) Axel Ottosson	IF Björklöven	48	15	33	48	+26	35
(Canada) Kristoff Kontos	Kristianstads IK	52	15	33	48	+11	10
(Sweden) Max Lindholm	AIK	48	21	25	46	+6	46
(Sweden) Lukas Zetterberg	Västerås IK	48	21	25	46	+11	18

==== Leading goaltenders ====
The following shows the top ten goaltenders who led the league in goals against average, provided that they have played at least 40% of their team's minutes, at the conclusion of matches played on 16 March 2022.

Player	Team	GP	TOI	W	T	L	GA	SO	Sv%	GAA
(Norway) Lars Volden	BIK Karlskoga	29	1757:43	18	2	9	61	4	92.58	2.08
(Sweden) Johan Gustafsson	Västerås IK	35	2063:27	21	2	12	73	7	92.01	2.12
(Sweden) Marcus Hellgren Smed	BIK Karlskoga	23	1379:21	14	0	9	49	3	92.31	2.13
(Sweden) Jonas Gunnarsson	HV71	35	2060:48	26	1	8	75	7	90.76	2.18
(Denmark) Frederik Dichow	Kristianstads IK	28	1583:33	18	0	9	60	4	92.96	2.27
(Russia) Pavel Khomchenko	AIK	43	2485:15	22	2	18	95	4	92.67	2.29
(Finland) Joona Voutilainen	IF Björklöven	31	1837:57	21	1	9	75	2	91.99	2.45
(Sweden) Matteus Ward	Mora IK	33	1806:17	17	3	11	68	3	91.40	2.46
(Sweden) Tex Williamsson	Modo Hockey	32	1897:18	19	4	8	78	1	91.88	2.47
(Sweden) Viktor Andrén	Almtuna IS	22	1319:41	7	2	13	60	0	90.92	2.73

== Post-season ==
=== Playoff bracket ===
Eighth-finals; Swedish: Åttondelsfinal
7	Mora IK	2
10	Tingsryds AIF	1
8	Västerviks IK	2
9	AIK	0

Quarterfinals; Swedish: Kvartsfinal
1	HV71	4
8	Västerviks IK	1
2	Modo Hockey	4
6	Kristianstads IK	2
3	BIK Karlskoga	4
7	Mora IK	1
4	IF Björklöven	4
5	Västerås IK	1

Semifinals
1	HV71	4
3	BIK Karlskoga	0
(Pairings are re-seeded after the first and second round)
2	Modo Hockey	3
4	IF Björklöven	4

Finals
1	HV71	4
4	IF Björklöven	2

=== Eighth-finals ===
Teams 7–10 from the regular season will play best-of-three playoff series, where team 7 face team 10 and team 8 face team 9. In each series the higher-seeded team have home-ice advantage, playing at home for game 1 (plus 3 if necessary) while the lower-seeded team play at home for game 2. The winners move on to the quarterfinals.

==== Mora IK vs. Tingsryds AIF ====
18 March	Mora IK	2–3	OT	Tingsryds AIF	Smidjegrav Arena	Recap

20 March	Tingsryds AIF	0–3	Mora IK	Nelson Garden Arena	Recap

22 March	Mora IK	4–2	Tingsryds AIF	Smidjegrav Arena	Recap

Mora IK won series 2–1

==== Västerviks IK vs. AIK ====
18 March	Västerviks IK	6–2	AIK	Plivit Arena	Recap

20 March	AIK	2–4	Västerviks IK	Hovet	Recap

Västerviks IK won series 2–0

=== Quarterfinals ===
Teams 1–6 from the regular season, along with the winners of the eighth-finals, will play best-of-seven series, with the winners moving on to the semifinals. The highest-seeded team chose whether to play the second-lowest seed or the lowest seed. In each series the higher-seeded team has home-ice advantage, playing at home for games 1 and 2 (plus 5 and 7 if necessary) while the lower-seeded team plays at home for games 3 and 4 (plus 6 if necessary) The higher-seeded half of the teams chose their opponents, with the highest-seeded remaining team choosing at each step.

==== HV71 vs. Västerviks IK ====
24 March	HV71	7–0	Västerviks IK	Husqvarna Garden	Recap

26 March	HV71	5–2	Västerviks IK	Husqvarna Garden	Recap

28 March	Västerviks IK	2–11	HV71	Plivit Arena	Recap

30 March	Västerviks IK	4–3	HV71	Plivit Arena	Recap

1 April	HV71	5–1	Västerviks IK	Husqvarna Garden	Recap

HV71 won series 4–1

==== Modo Hockey vs. Kristianstads IK ====
24 March	Modo Hockey	1–0	Kristianstads IK	Hägglunds Arena	Recap

26 March	Modo Hockey	5–2	Kristianstads IK	Hägglunds Arena	Recap

28 March	Kristianstads IK	4–2	Modo Hockey	Kristianstads Ishall	Recap

30 March	Kristianstads IK	2–7	Modo Hockey	Kristianstads Ishall	Recap

1 April	Modo Hockey	2–3	OT	Kristianstads IK	Hägglunds Arena	Recap

3 April	Kristianstads IK	2–3	Modo Hockey	Kristianstads Ishall	Recap

Modo Hockey won series 4–2

==== BIK Karlskoga vs. Mora IK ====
25 March	BIK Karlskoga	2–0	Mora IK	Nobelhallen	Recap

27 March	BIK Karlskoga	2–1	Mora IK	Nobelhallen	Recap

29 March	Mora IK	7–3	BIK Karlskoga	Smidjegrav Arena	Recap

31 March	Mora IK	4–5	OT	BIK Karlskoga	Smidjegrav Arena	Recap

2 April	BIK Karlskoga	2–0	Mora IK	Nobelhallen	Recap

BIK Karlskoga won series 4–1

==== IF Björklöven vs. Västerås IK ====
25 March	IF Björklöven	6–1	Västerås IK	A3 Arena	Recap

27 March	IF Björklöven	2–3	Västerås IK	A3 Arena	Recap

29 March	Västerås IK	1–3	IF Björklöven	ABB Arena Nord	Recap

31 March	Västerås IK	2–3	2OT	IF Björklöven	ABB Arena Nord	Recap

2 April	IF Björklöven	2–1	Västerås IK	A3 Arena	Recap

IF Björklöven won series 4–1

=== Semifinals ===
The winners of the quarterfinals play best-of-seven series, with the winners moving on to the Finals. The highest-seeded team chose whether to play the second-lowest seed or the lowest seed. In each series the higher-seeded team has home-ice advantage, playing at home for games 1 and 2 (plus 5 and 7 if necessary) while the lower-seeded team plays at home for games 3 and 4 (plus 6 if necessary).

==== HV71 vs. BIK Karlskoga ====
8 April	HV71	2–1	BIK Karlskoga	Husqvarna Garden	Recap

10 April	HV71	5–2	BIK Karlskoga	Husqvarna Garden	Recap

12 April	BIK Karlskoga	3–5	HV71	Nobelhallen	Recap

14 April	BIK Karlskoga	2–3	OT	HV71	Nobelhallen	Recap

HV71 won series 4–0

==== Modo Hockey vs. IF Björklöven ====
9 April	Modo Hockey	4–1	IF Björklöven	Hägglunds Arena	Recap

11 April	Modo Hockey	1–2	2OT	IF Björklöven	Hägglunds Arena	Recap

13 April	IF Björklöven	3–2	Modo Hockey	A3 Arena	Recap

15 April	IF Björklöven	2–3	Modo Hockey	A3 Arena	Recap

17 April	Modo Hockey	2–1	IF Björklöven	Hägglunds Arena	Recap

19 April	IF Björklöven	5–3	Modo Hockey	A3 Arena	Recap

21 April	Modo Hockey	3–8	IF Björklöven	Hägglunds Arena	Recap

IF Bjöklöven won series 4–3

=== Finals ===
The winners of the semifinals will play a best-of-seven series, with the winner being promoted to the Swedish Hockey League (SHL). The higher-seeded team has home-ice advantage, playing at home for games 1 and 2 (plus 5 and 7 if necessary) while the lower-seeded team play at home for games 3 and 4 (plus 6 if necessary).

==== HV71 vs. IF Björklöven ====
23 April	HV71	6–1	IF Björklöven	Husqvarna Garden	Recap

25 April	HV71	1–3	IF Björklöven	Husqvarna Garden	Recap

27 April	IF Björklöven	1–5	HV71	A3 Arena	Recap

29 April	IF Björklöven	2–3	OT	HV71	A3 Arena	Recap

1 May	HV71	2–7	IF Björklöven	Husqvarna Garden	Recap

4 May	IF Björklöven	2–3	OT	HV71	A3 Arena	Recap

HV71 won series 4–2

=== Play Out ===
Teams 13 and 14 from the regular season will play a best-of-seven series, with the winner remaining in HockeyAllsvenskan and the loser being relegated to Hockeyettan. The higher-seeded team has home-ice advantage, playing at home for games 1 and 2 (plus 5 if necessary) while the lower-seeded team playeat home for game 3 (plus 4 if necessary).

==== Södertälje SK vs. IF Troja-Ljungby ====
19 March	Södertälje SK	3–1	IF Troja-Ljungby	Scaniarinken	Recap

21 March	Södertälje SK	2–0	IF Troja-Ljungby	Scaniarinken	Recap

23 March	IF Troja-Ljungby	3–2	OT	Södertälje SK	Ljungby Arena	Recap

25 March	IF Troja-Ljungby	0–3	Södertälje SK	Ljungby Arena	Recap

27 March	Södertälje SK	1–6	IF Troja-Ljungby	Scaniarinken	Recap

30 March	IF Troja-Ljungby	1–2	2OT	Södertälje SK	Ljungby Arena	Recap

Södertälje SK won series 4–2
