= 2023–24 HockeyAllsvenskan season =

- League: HockeyAllsvenskan
- Sport: Ice hockey
- Duration: 21 September 2023 – 7 March 2024 (regular season)
- Teams: 14
- TV partner: TV4
- First place: Brynäs IF
- Top scorer: Marcus Eriksson (Södertälje SK)
- Promoted to SHL: Brynäs IF
- Relegated to Hockeyettan: Västerviks IK

HockeyAllsvenskan seasons
- 2022–23 2024–25

The 2023–24 HockeyAllsvenskan season was the 19th season of HockeyAllsvenskan, the second-highest professional ice hockey league in Sweden. The season consists of 14 teams playing a regular season in which each team played each other team four times—twice at home and twice away. The regular season is followed by a series of promotion and relegation tournaments, with the teams finishing first through tenth participating in promotion playoffs, and those finishing thirteenth and fourteenth forced to requalify to avoid relegation to Hockeyettan.

For the 2023–24 season, there were three team movements. Modo Hockey was promoted to the SHL as reigning 2023 HockeyAllsvenskan champions. Despite losing the play-out, Västerviks IK remained in the league as HC Vita Hästen was forced out due to a club bankruptcy. Nybro Vikings and Kalmar HC were moved up from Hockeyettan.

== Participating teams ==
HockeyAllsvenskan team map

Team	City	Arena	Capacity
AIK	Stockholm	Hovet	8,094
Almtuna IS	Uppsala	Upplands Bilforum Arena	2,800
IF Björklöven	Umeå	Winpos Arena	5,400
Brynäs IF	Gävle	Monitor ERP Arena	7,909
Djurgårdens IF	Stockholm	Hovet	8,094
BIK Karlskoga	Karlskoga	Nobelhallen	6,300
Modo Hockey	Örnsköldsvik	Hägglunds Arena	7,350
Mora IK	Mora	Smidjegrav Arena	4,500
Södertälje SK	Södertälje	Scaniarinken	6,200
Tingsryds AIF	Tingsryd	Nelson Garden Arena	3,400
Västerviks IK	Västervik	Plivit Arena	2,500
Västerås IK	Västerås	ABB Arena Nord	4,902
Östersunds IK	Östersund	Östersund Arena	2,700

== Regular season ==
=== Standings ===
Pos	Team	Pld	W	OTW	OTL	L	GF	GA	GD	Pts	Qualification or relegation
1	Brynäs IF	52	33	5	3	11	199	127	+72	112	Advance to the Quarterfinals
2	Södertälje SK	52	28	3	5	16	170	129	+41	95	Advance to the Quarterfinals
3	AIK	52	25	7	6	14	166	134	+32	95	Advance to the Quarterfinals
4	Djurgårdens IF	52	25	6	6	15	159	136	+23	93	Advance to the Quarterfinals
5	Mora IK	52	24	8	3	17	152	126	+26	91	Advance to the Quarterfinals
6	IF Björklöven	52	21	8	6	17	170	139	+31	85	Advance to the Quarterfinals
7	BIK Karlskoga	52	21	6	5	20	155	147	+8	80	Advance to the Eighth-finals
8	Nybro Vikings	52	20	7	3	22	154	157	−3	77	Advance to the Eighth-finals
9	Almtuna IS	52	18	8	6	20	128	155	−27	76	Advance to the Eighth-finals
10	Kalmar HC	52	19	6	5	22	151	169	−18	74	Advance to the Eighth-finals
11	Västerås IK	52	17	4	5	26	154	177	−23	64	
12	Tingsryds AIF	52	14	4	12	22	121	160	−39	62	
13	Östersunds IK	52	12	4	6	30	123	163	−40	50	Advance to Play Out
14	Västerviks IK	52	9	2	7	34	109	192	−83	38	Advance to Play Out

Updated to match(es) played on 7 March 2024. Source: swehockey.se

== Post-season ==
=== Playoff bracket ===
Eighth-finals; Swedish: Åttondelsfinal
7	BIK Karlskoga	2
10	Kalmar HC	1
8	Nybro Vikings	2
9	Almtuna IS	0

Quarterfinals; Swedish: Kvartsfinal
1	Brynäs IF	4
8	Nybro Vikings	0
2	Södertälje SK	0
7	BIK Karlskoga	4
3	AIK	2
5	Mora IK	4
4	Djurgårdens IF	4
6	IF Björklöven	1

Semifinals
1	Brynäs IF	4
7	BIK Karlskoga	1
(Pairings are re-seeded after the first and second round)
4	Djurgårdens IF	4
5	Mora IK	2

Finals
1	Brynäs IF	4
4	Djurgårdens IF	0

=== Eighth-finals ===
Teams 7–10 from the regular season will play best-of-three playoff series, where team 7 face team 10 and team 8 face team 9. In each series the higher-seeded team have home-ice advantage, playing at home for game 2 (plus 3 if necessary) while the lower-seeded team play at home for game 1. The winners move on to the quarterfinals.

==== (7) BIK Karlskoga vs. (10) Kalmar HC ====
10 March	Kalmar HC	3–2	BIK Karlskoga	Hatstore Arena	Recap

12 March	BIK Karlskoga	6–0	Kalmar HC	Nobelhallen	Recap

14 March	BIK Karlskoga	5–1	Kalmar HC	Nobelhallen	Recap

BIK Karlskoga won series 2–1

==== (8) Nybro Vikings vs. (9) Almtuna IS ====
10 March	Almtuna IS	3–6	Nybro Vikings	Upplands Bilforum Arena	Recap

12 March	Nybro Vikings	4–0	Almtuna IS	Liljas Arena	Recap

Nybro Vikings won series 2–0

=== Quarterfinals ===
Teams 1–6 from the regular season, along with the winners of the eighth-finals, will play best-of-seven series, with the winners moving on to the semifinals. The highest-seeded team chose whether to play the second-lowest seed or the lowest seed. In each series the higher-seeded team has home-ice advantage, playing at home for games 1 and 2 (plus 5 and 7 if necessary) while the lower-seeded team plays at home for games 3 and 4 (plus 6 if necessary) The higher-seeded half of the teams chose their opponents, with the highest-seeded remaining team choosing at each step.

==== (1) Brynäs IF vs. (8) Nybro Vikings ====
17 March	Brynäs IF	2–1	Nybro Vikings	Monitor ERP Arena	Recap

19 March	Brynäs IF	4–1	Nybro Vikings	Monitor ERP Arena	Recap

21 March	Nybro Vikings	1–2	Brynäs IF	Liljas Arena

23 March	Nybro Vikings	1–2	Brynäs IF	Liljas Arena

Brynäs IF wins series 4–0

==== (2) Södertälje SK vs. (7) BIK Karlskoga ====
18 March	Södertälje SK	1–2	OT	BIK Karlskoga	Scaniarinken	Recap

20 March	Södertälje SK	2–3	2OT	BIK Karlskoga	Scaniarinken

22 March	BIK Karlskoga	3–2	OT	Södertälje SK	Nobelhallen

24 March	BIK Karlskoga	4–2	Södertälje SK	Nobelhallen

BIK Karlskoga wins series 4–0

==== (3) AIK vs. (5) Mora IK ====
16 March	AIK	4–1	Mora IK	Hovet	Recap

19 March	AIK	4–1	Mora IK	Hovet	Recap

21 March	Mora IK	4–1	AIK	Smidjegrav Arena

23 March	Mora IK	4–3	2OT	AIK	Smidjegrav Arena

25 March	AIK	3–4	2OT	Mora IK	Hovet

27 March	Mora IK	3–1	AIK	Smidjegrav Arena

Mora IK wins series 4–2

==== (4) Djurgårdens IF vs. (6) IF Björklöven ====
18 March	Djurgårdens IF	6–2	IF Björklöven	Hovet	Recap

20 March	Djurgårdens IF	4–3	OT	IF Björklöven	Hovet

22 March	IF Björklöven	4–3	OT	Djurgårdens IF	Winpos Arena

24 March	IF Björklöven	3–2	Djurgårdens IF	Winpos Arena

26 March	Djurgårdens IF	4–3	IF Björklöven	Hovet

Djurgårdens IF wins series 4–1

=== Semifinals ===
The winners of the quarterfinals play best-of-seven series, with the winners moving on to the Finals. The highest-seeded team chose whether to play the second-lowest seed or the lowest seed. In each series the higher-seeded team has home-ice advantage, playing at home for games 1 and 2 (plus 5 and 7 if necessary) while the lower-seeded team plays at home for games 3 and 4 (plus 6 if necessary).

==== (1) Brynäs IF vs. (7) BIK Karlskoga ====
1 April	Brynäs IF	3–2	OT	BIK Karlskoga	Monitor ERP Arena

3 April	Brynäs IF	4–1	BIK Karlskoga	Monitor ERP Arena

5 April	BIK Karlskoga	3–2	OT	Brynäs IF	Nobelhallen

7 April	BIK Karlskoga	2–6	Brynäs IF	Nobelhallen

9 April	Brynäs IF	4–3	OT	BIK Karlskoga	Monitor ERP Arena	Recap

Brynäs IF wins series 4–1

==== (4) Djurgårdens IF vs. (5) Mora IK ====
2 April	Djurgårdens IF	3–2	Mora IK	Hovet

4 April	Djurgårdens IF	1–3	Mora IK	Hovet

6 April	Mora IK	5–6	Djurgårdens IF	Smidjegrav Arena

8 April	Mora IK	2–3	OT	Djurgårdens IF	Smidjegrav Arena

10 April	Djurgårdens IF	1–6	Mora IK	Hovet

12 April	Mora IK	0–1	2OT	Djurgårdens IF	Smidjegrav Arena	Recap

Djurgårdens IF wins series 4–2

=== Finals ===
The winners of the semifinals will play a best-of-seven series, with the winner being promoted to the Swedish Hockey League (SHL). The higher-seeded team has home-ice advantage, playing at home for games 1 and 2 (plus 5 and 7 if necessary) while the lower-seeded team play at home for games 3 and 4 (plus 6 if necessary).

==== (1) Brynäs IF vs. (4) Djurgårdens IF ====
17 April	Brynäs IF	6–2	Djurgårdens IF	Monitor ERP Arena
Tyler Kelleher (4) – 0:43; Jack Kopacka (7) – 4:38; Greg Scott (4; PPG) – 7:08		First period	19:49 – Alexander Ytterell (3; PPG)
Greg Scott (5; PPG) – 8:56; Tyler Kelleher (5; PPG) – 16:49		Second period	No scoring
Tyler Kelleher (6; ENG) – 17:35		Third period	8:23 – Anton Gradin (2)
Damian Clara (29 saves / 31 shots)		Goalie stats	Viktor Andrén (7 saves / 10 shots); Hugo Hävelid (18 saves / 20 shots)

19 April	Brynäs IF	2–1	Djurgårdens IF	Monitor ERP Arena
No scoring		First period	No scoring
No scoring		Second period	11:27 – Marcus Krüger (2)
Tyler Kelleher (7) – 3:56; Kārlis Čukste (1) – 5:48		Third period	No scoring
Damian Clara (16 saves / 17 shots)		Goalie stats	Viktor Andrén (17 saves / 19 shots)

21 April	Djurgårdens IF	3–6	Brynäs IF	Hovet
Linus Klasen (3; PPG) – 13:52		First period	No scoring
No scoring		Second period	3:08 – Oliver Tärnström (1); 9:24 – Jordie Benn (1); 13:08 – Noel Nordh (1); 15:41 – Tyler Vesel (4)
Anton Gradin (3) – 12:33; Ludvig Rensfeldt (6) – 16:12		Third period	12:08 – Theo Lindstein (1); 17:04 – Tyler Vesel (5; ENG)
Viktor Andrén (20 saves / 25 shots)		Goalie stats	Damian Clara (26 saves / 29 shots)

23 April	Djurgårdens IF	1–3	Brynäs IF	Hovet
No scoring		First period	17:19 – Oliver Tärnström (2)
Edvin Hammarlund (2) – 9:24		Second period	1:41 – Greg Scott (6); 2:06 – Oliver Tärnström (3)
No scoring		Third period	No scoring
Viktor Andrén (30 saves / 33 shots)		Goalie stats	Damian Clara (18 saves / 19 shots)

Brynäs IF wins series 4–0

=== Play Out ===
Teams 13 and 14 from the regular season will play a best-of-seven series, with the winner remaining in HockeyAllsvenskan and the loser being relegated to Hockeyettan. The higher-seeded team has home-ice advantage, playing at home for games 1 and 2 (plus 5 and 7 if necessary) while the lower-seeded team plays at home for games 3 and 4 (plus 6 if necessary).

==== (13) Östersunds IK vs. (14) Västerviks IK ====
11 March	Östersunds IK	1–3	Västerviks IK	Östersund Arena	Recap

13 March	Östersunds IK	3–2	Västerviks IK	Östersund Arena	Recap

16 March	Västerviks IK	6–2	Östersunds IK	ACT-hallen	Recap

18 March	Västerviks IK	1–2	Östersunds IK	ACT-hallen	Recap

21 March	Östersunds IK	3–1	Västerviks IK	Östersund Arena

23 March	Västerviks IK	1–5	Östersunds IK	ACT-hallen

Östersunds IK wins series 4-2
