= J20 Regional =

Swedish junior ice hockey league

- Sport: Ice hockey
- Founded: 1980
- No. of teams: 36
- Country: Sweden
- Most recent champion: Örebro HK J20 Promoted to J20 Nationell

J20 Regional is the 2nd tier junior ice hockey league in Sweden composed of 36 teams in 4 regional divisions (Norra (Northern), Östra (Eastern), Västra (Western) and Södra (Southern)).

== Format ==
The regular season is played in the divisional format from mid September until the beginning of March, at that time the top team in each of the 4 divisions play in the Play off to J20 Nationell against the bottom 2 Nationell teams. The top 2 teams in the play off play the next season in J20 Nationell, the other 4 teams will play in J20 Regional.

== Teams ==
J20 Regional Norra

Norra (Northern)
Team	City	Arena
Asplöven HC / Kalix UHC (Cooperative team)	Haparanda	Arena Polarica
Bodens HF	Boden	Björknäshallen
IF Björklöven	Umeå	T3 Center
IF Sundsvall Hockey	Sundsvall	Gärdehov
Kiruna IF	Kiruna	Lombiahallen
Piteå HC	Piteå	LF Arena
Vännäs HC	Vännäs	Vännäs Ishall
Östersunds IK	Östersund	Z-hallen

Östra (Eastern)
Team	City	Arena
Almtuna IS	Uppsala	Metallåtervinning Arena
Enköpings SK	Enköping	Bahcohallen
Flemingsbergs IK	Huddinge	Visättra Ishall
Huddinge IK	Huddinge	Björkängshallen
IFK Tumba	Tumba	Ishuset
Nacka HK	Nacka	Nacka Ishall
Nynäshamns IF	Nynäshamn	Folkets Hall
Värmdö HC	Gustavsberg	Ekhallen

Västra (Western)
Team	City	Arena
Avesta BK	Avesta	Avesta Ishall
BIK Karlskoga	Karlskoga	Nobelhallen
Borlänge HF	Borlänge	Borlänge Ishall
Falu IF	Falun	Lugnets Ishall
Grums IK	Grums	Billerudshallen
Hammarö HC	Skoghall	Hammarö Ishall
Hedemora SK	Hedemora	Bolidenhallen
Skåre BK	Karlstad	Löfbergs Arena
Valbo HC	Valbo	NickBack Arena

Södra (Southern)
Team	City	Arena
Borås HC	Borås	Borås Ishall
HC Dalen	Jönköping	SkandiaMäklarna Center Norrahammar
IF Mölndal Hockey	Mölndal	Åby Isstadion
IF Troja/Ljungby	Ljungby	Sunnerbohov
Halmstad Hammers	Halmstad	Halmstad Arena
Kungälvs IK	Kungälv	Oasen
Mariestad BoIS HC	Mariestad	Katrinhallen
Mjölby HC	Mjölby	Toyota Material Handling Arena
Tingsryds AIF	Tingsryd	Nelson Garden Arena
Västerviks IK	Västervik	Plivit Arena

== Results ==
The top teams from each division play in a Promotion and relegation series with the bottom 2 teams from J20 Nationell to determine promotions/relegations. The below table shows the promotions and relegation's from and to J20 Regional.

Year	Promoted to J20 SuperElit	Relegated to J20 Elit	Promoted from J20 Div. 1	Relegated to J20 Div. 1
2012-13	Örebro HK	Huddinge IK	Värmdö HC; Kungälvs IK	None
2011-12	None	IF Björklöven	None	Kungälvs IK
2010-11	None	Troja-Ljungby	Leksands IF	Västerviks IK; Skedvi/Säter; Vallentuna BK; Trångsunds IF; Väsby IK
