= Indoor venues in Sweden =

These venues are multi-used for indoor games, such as ice hockey, bandy, handball and floorball. Concerts and exhibitions are shown when the venues are not in use. Some of the venues are used in the national league in respectively sport.

Location	Arena	Date built	Capacity	Recently held/upcoming tournaments
Ängelholm	Catena Arena	2008	4,600	
Boden	Björknäshallen	1970	5,000	
Gävle	Gavlerinken Arena	2006	8,500	2007 Euro Hockey Tour
Gothenburg	Frölundaborg	1967	7,670	2007 Swedish Men's Handball Championships
Gothenburg	Gothenburg Convention Centre	1918 (1984)	22,000	
Gothenburg	Lisebergshallen	1982	7,000	
Gothenburg	Scandinavium	1971	14,000	Eurovision Song Contest 1985, 2002 Men's World Ice Hockey Championships, 2008 World Figure Skating Championships, 2010 FINA World Masters Championships, 2013 European Athletics Indoor Championships
Halmstad	Halmstad Arena	2009	4,500	
Helsingborg	Idrottens Hus	1957	2,400	Davis Cup
Helsingborg	Helsingborg Arena	2012	4,700	2016 European Women's Handball Championship
Jönköping	Elmia Eventcenter	1961	15,000 (concerts)	DreamHack International Demo Competition
Jönköping	Kinnarps Arena	2000	7,038	2004 Men's Handball World Cup
Jönköping	Rosenlundshallen	1958	5,000	
Karlskrona	Rosenholm Arena	2006	5,000	2007 Swedish Figure Skating Championships
Karlstad	Löfbergs Arena	2000	10,000	2000 Karjala Ice Hockey Tournament, 2010 IIHF Men's InLine Hockey World Championship
Katrineholm	Woodyhallen	2006	3,000	
Kiruna	Arena Arctica	2000	5,000	
Kristianstad	Kristianstad Arena	2009	5,000	2011 World Men's Handball Championships
Kristinehamn	Environiq Arena	2007	10,000 (concerts)	
Leksand	Tegera Arena	2005	7,650	2007 4 Nations Cup, 2007 World Junior Ice Hockey Championships
Luleå	Coop Norrbotten Arena	2002	5,800	2003 EuroBasket Championships
Lidköping	Lidköping Arena	2009	12,500 (concerts)	
Linköping	Saab Arena	2004	8,500	2005 Women's World Ice Hockey Championships, 2008 Men's Swedish Ice Hockey Championships
Lund	Sparbanken Skåne Arena	2008	3,000	2011 World Men's Handball Championships
Malmö	Malmö Arena	2008	15,000	Eurovision Song Contest 2013, 2013 Men's Ice Hockey World Championships, 2011 World Men's Handball Championship
Malmö	Malmö Ice	1970	5,800	2003 European Figure Skating Championships, 2008 Swedish Short Course Swimming Championships
Malmö	Malmö Convention Centre	1968	6,000	
Mora	FM Mattsson Arena	2004	5,000	2007 World Junior Ice Hockey Championships
Norrköping	Himmelstalundshallen	1977	5,000	2011 World Men's Handball Championships
Nybro	Liljas Arena	1963	2,380	
Nyköping	PEAB Arena	2003	5,500	2008 Swedish Swimming Championships
Uppsala	Metallåtervinning Arena	1974	2,800	
Örnsköldsvik	Hägglunds Arena	2006	7,600	2008 European Curling Championships
Örnsköldsvik	Kempehallen	1964	5,200	
Östersund	Jämtkraft Arena	2007	5,000	
Sandviken	Göransson Arena	2009	10,000 (concerts)	
Skellefteå	Skellefteå Kraft Arena	2007	6,001	
Södertälje	AXA Sports Center	2005	7,250	
Södertälje	Täljehallen	1984	12,500 (concerts)	
Stockholm	Annexet	1985	6,000	2006 Men's World Floorball Championships
Stockholm	Hovet	1955	10,000	2006 European Women's Handball Championships
Stockholm	Solnahallen	1986	10,000 (concerts)	
Stockholm	Solnais	1956	6,000	
Stockholm	Stockholm Convention Centre	1941	5,000	
Stockholm	Ericsson Globe	1989	16,500	Eurovision Song Contest 2000, 2002 European Men's Handball Championship, 2004 World Cup of Hockey, 2007 Monster Jam Finals, 2008 European Volleyball Championships, Eurovision Song Contest 2016
Timrå	E.ON Arena	2003	6,000	
Tingsryd	Dackehallen	1969	4,200	
Umeå	SkyCom Arena	2001	6,000	
Vänersborg	Arena Vänersborg	2009	3,000	
Västerås	Arena Nord	2007	5,800	2009 Floorball World Championships
Västerås	Arena Syd	2007	9,000	Bandy World Championship 2009
Växjö	Vida Arena	2011	5,700	Melodifestivalen 2012
Växjö	Växjö Ishall	1970	4,015	

== Venues ==
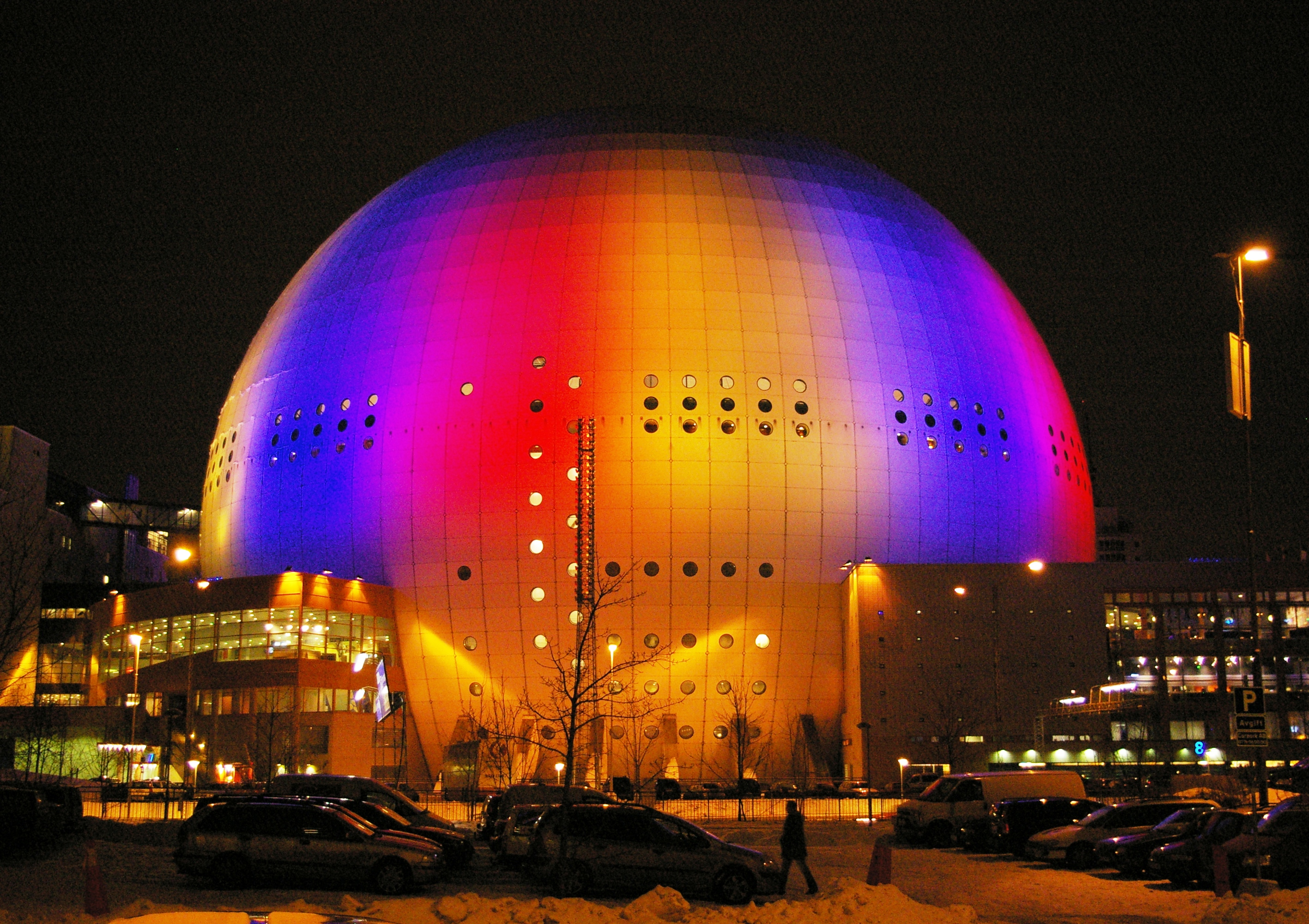
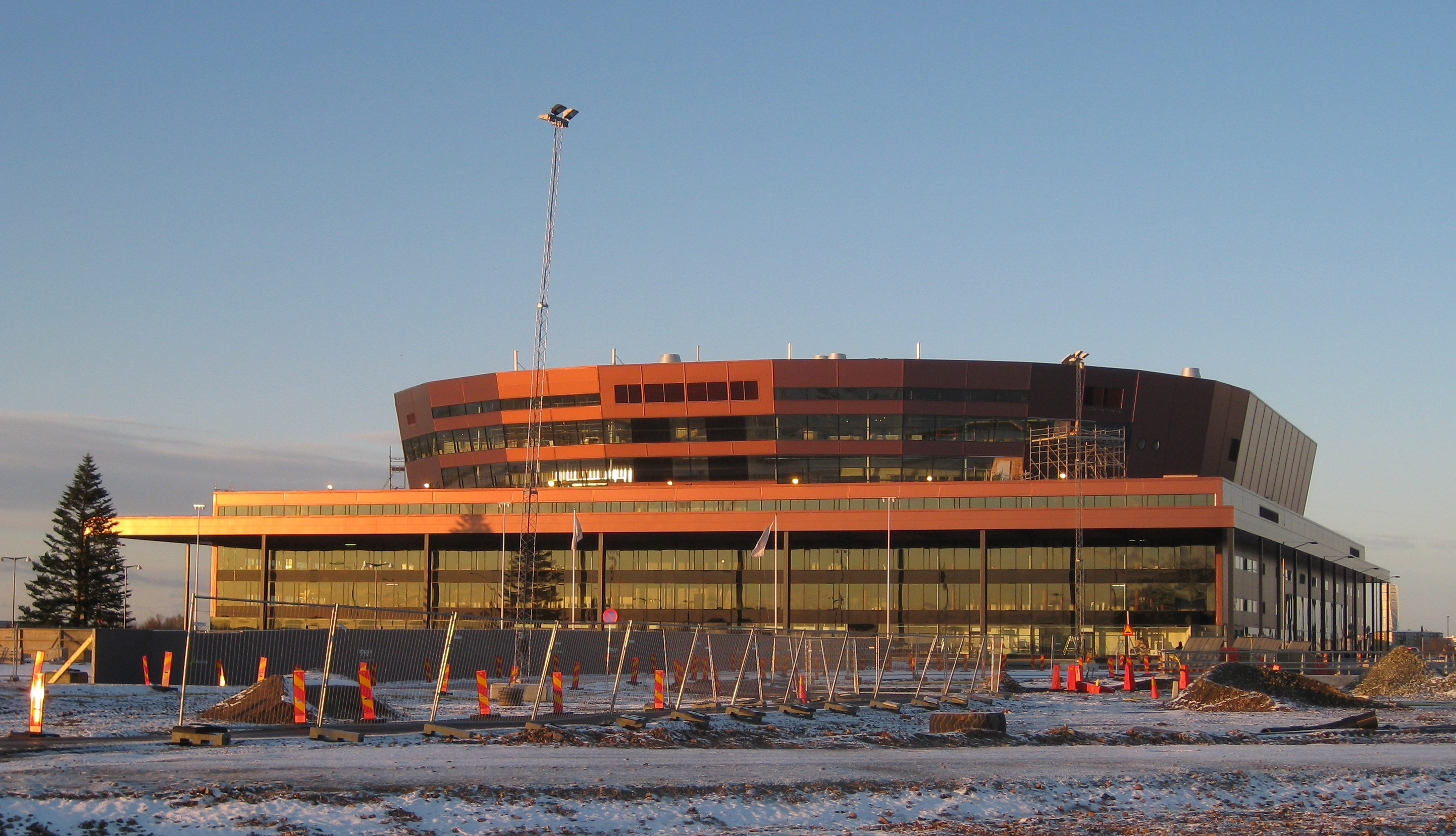
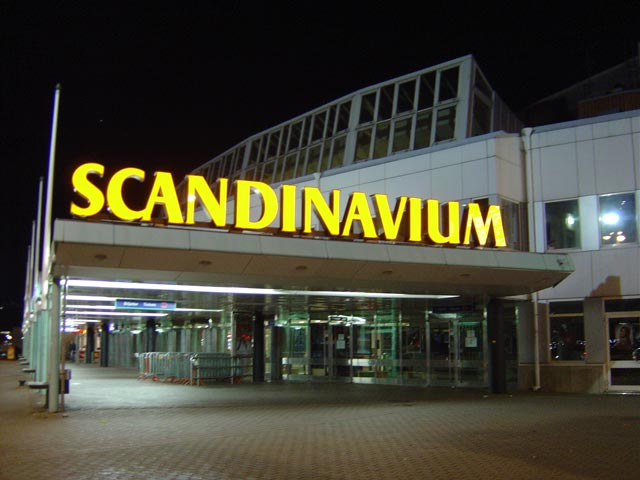
Ericsson Globe

Location: Stockholm
Capacity: 14,119
Date built: 1989
Tenant: Sweden men's national ice hockey team

Malmö Arena

Location: Malmö
Capacity: 13,500
Date built: 2009
Clubs: Malmö Redhawks

Scandinavium

Location: Gothenburg
Capacity: 12,044
Date built: 1971
Club: Frölunda HC

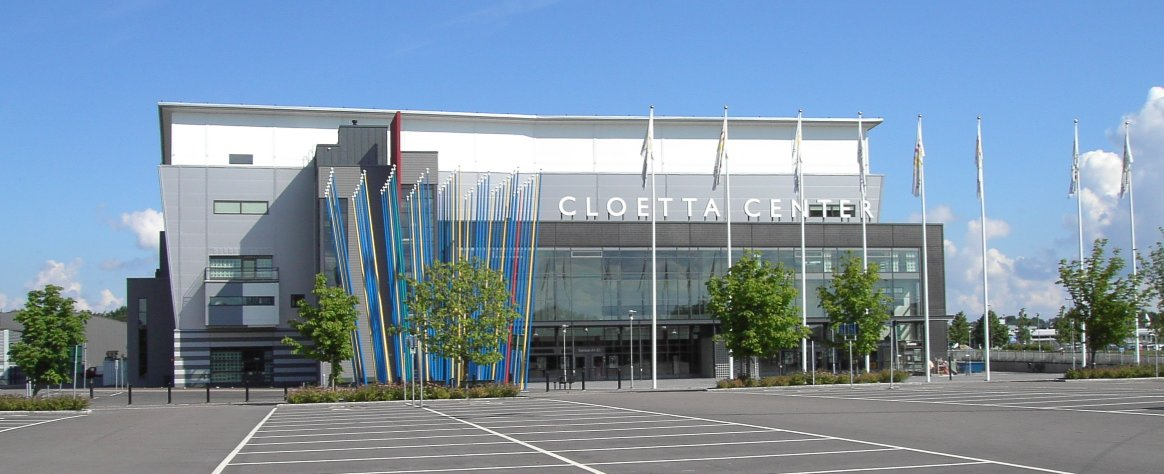
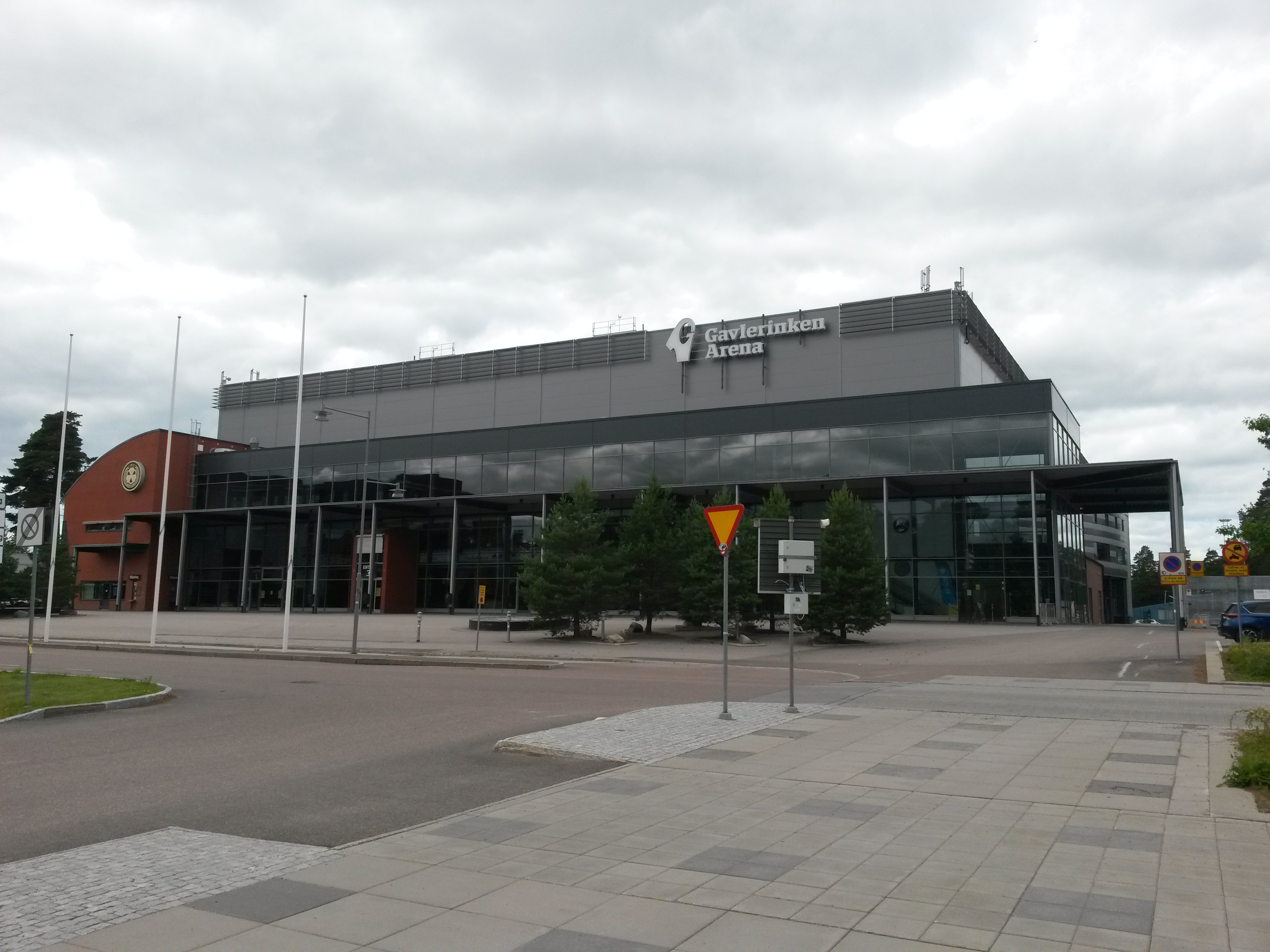
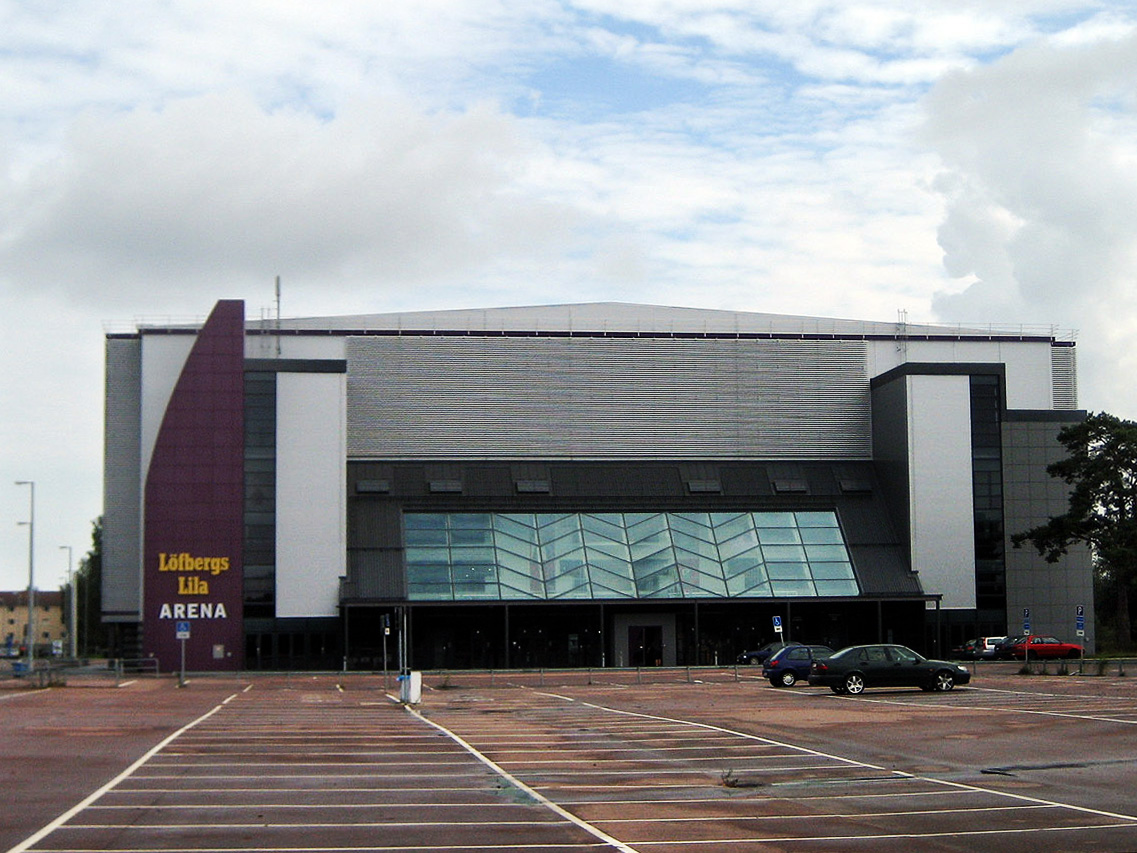
Saab Arena

Location: Linköping
Capacity: 8,500
Date built: 2004
Club: Linköping HC

Gavlerinken Arena

Location: Gävle
Capacity: 8,265
Date built: 2006
Club: Brynäs IF

Löfbergs Arena

Location: Karlstad
Capacity: 8,250
Date built: 2001
Club: Färjestads BK

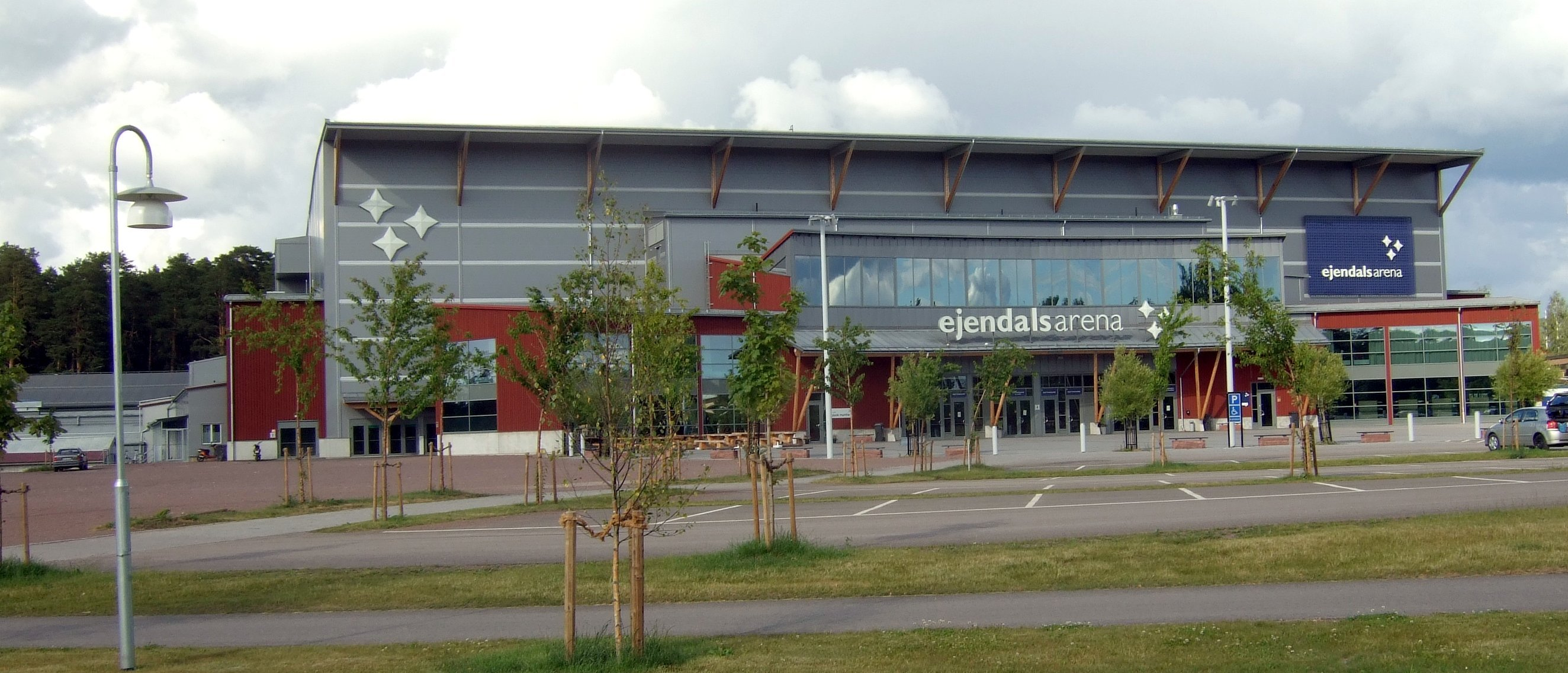
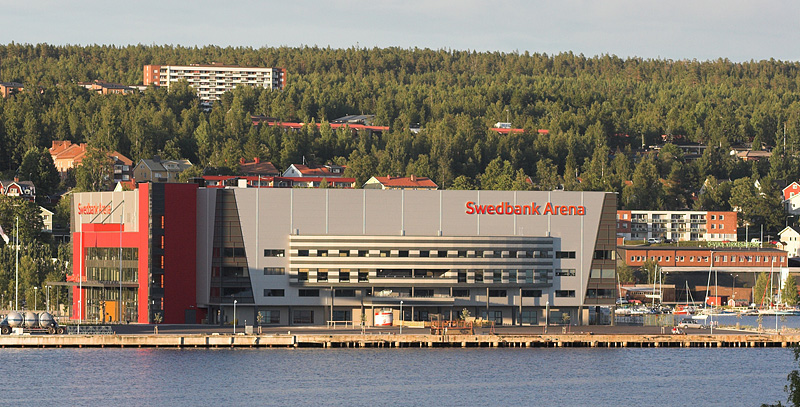
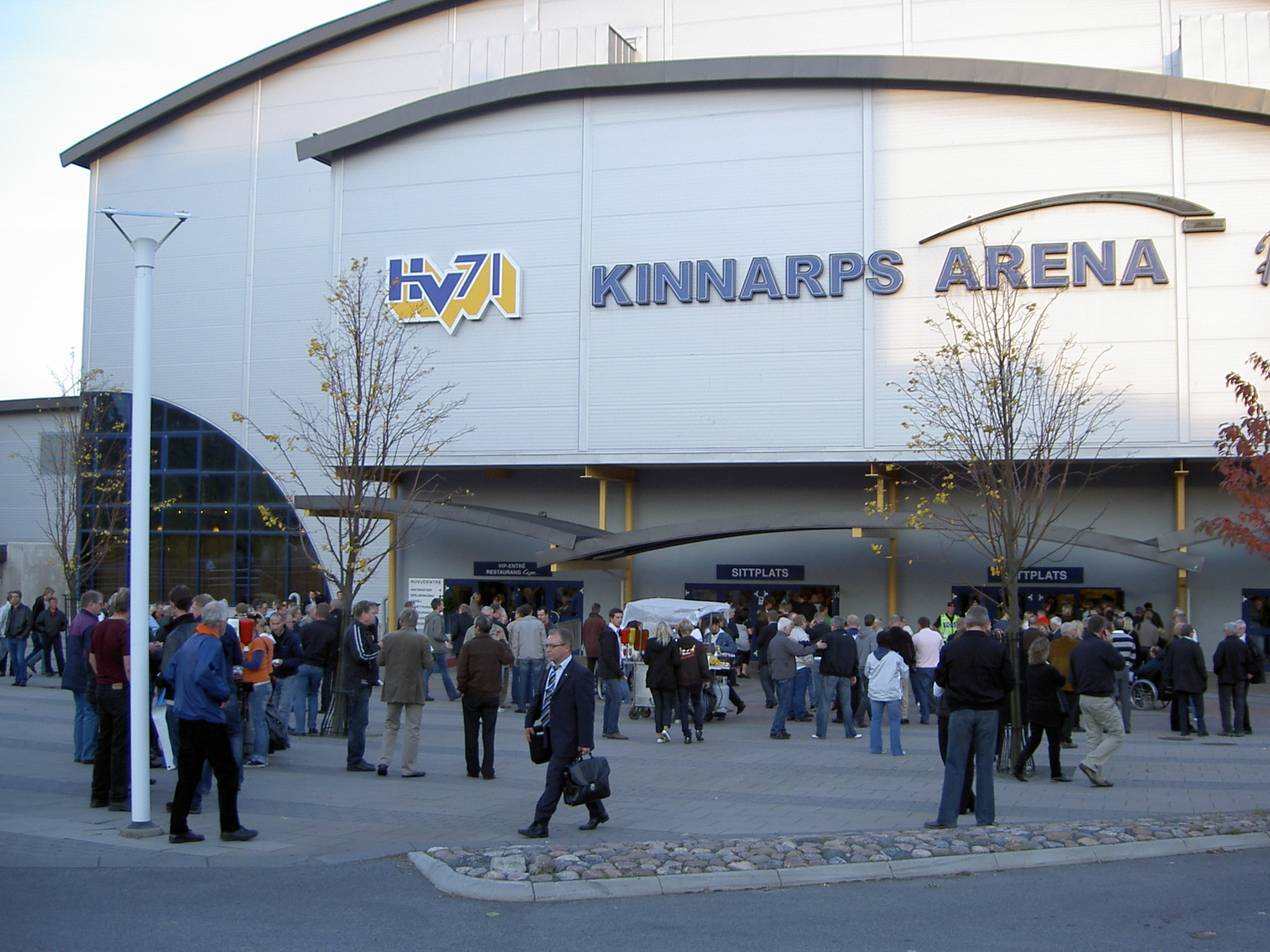
Tegera Arena

Location: Leksand
Capacity: 7,650
Date built: 2005
Club: Leksands IF

Arctic Fox Centre

Location: Örnsköldsvik
Capacity: 7,600
Date built: 2006
Club: Modo Hockey

Kinnarps Arena

Location: Jönköping
Capacity: 7,038
Date built: 2000
Club: HV71

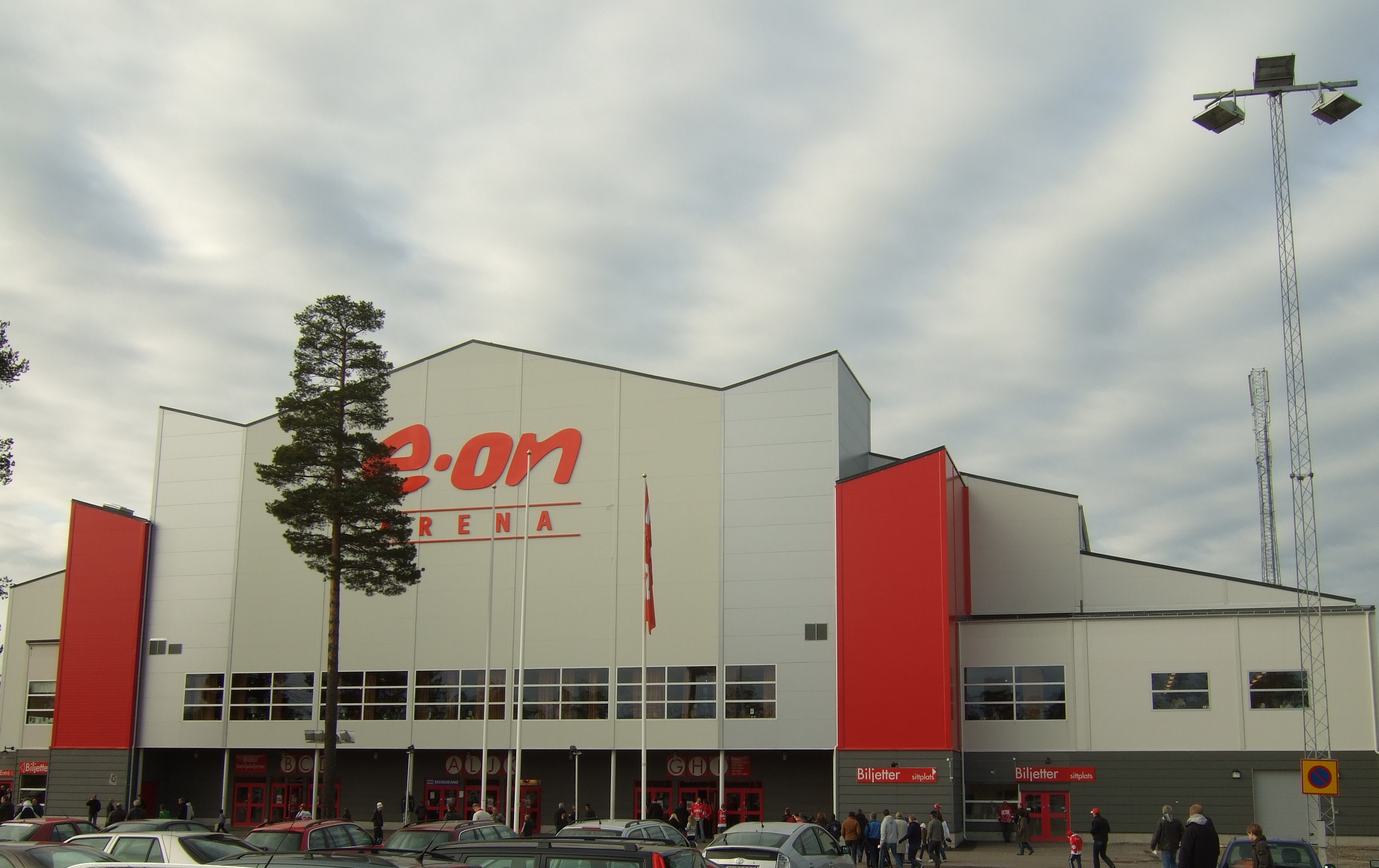
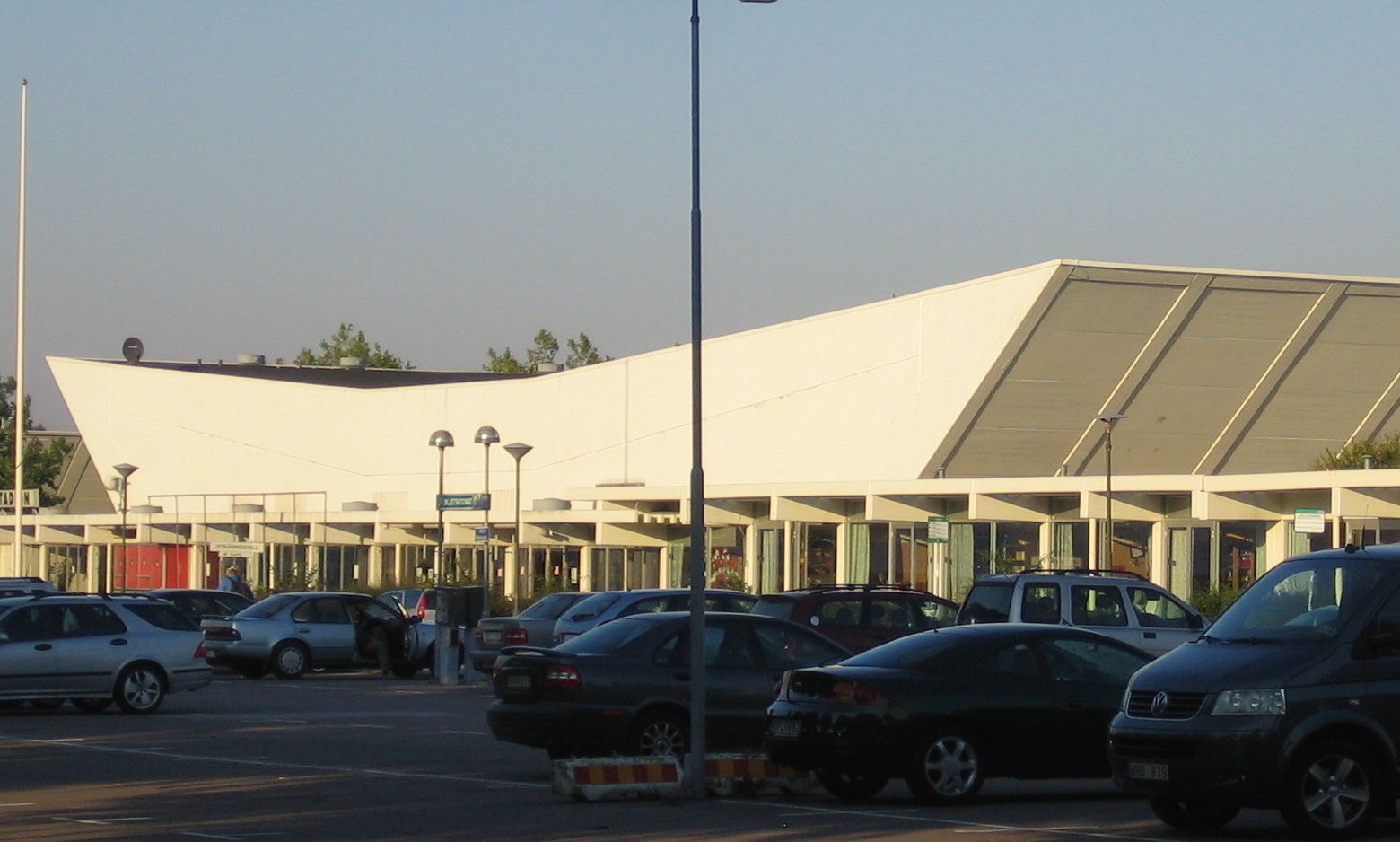
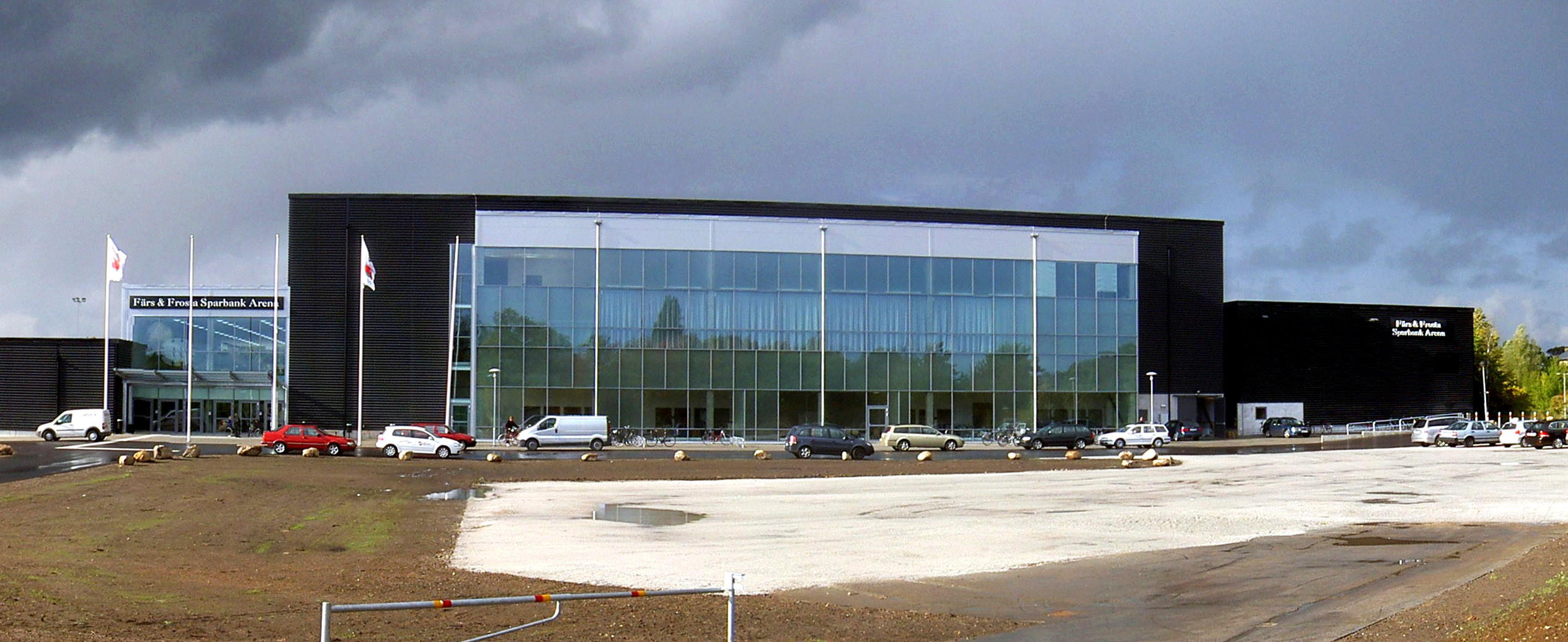
E.ON Arena

Location: Timrå
Capacity: 6,000
Date built: 2003
Club: Timrå IK

Malmö Isstadion

Location: Malmö
Capacity: 5,800
Date built: 1962
Club: None

FFS Arena

Location: Lund
Capacity: 3,000
Date built: 2008
Club: H43
