= Marcus Krüger =

Swedish ice hockey player (born 1990)

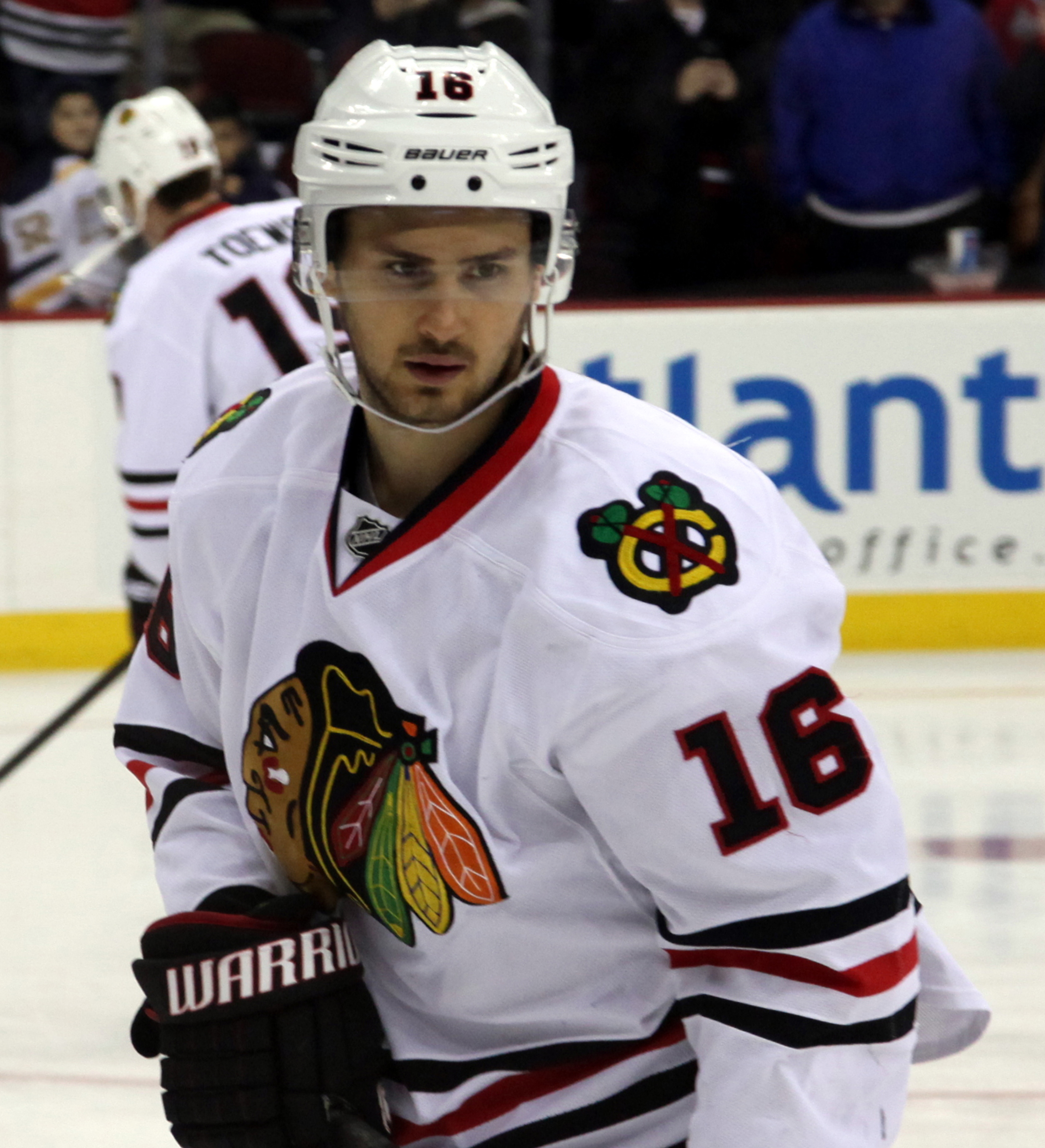
- Krüger with the Chicago Blackhawks in December 2014
- Born: 27 May 1990 (age 36) Stockholm, Sweden
- Height: 6 ft 0 in (183 cm)
- Weight: 185 lb (84 kg; 13 st 3 lb)
- Position: Centre
- Shoots: Left
- SHL team Former teams: Djurgårdens IF; Chicago Blackhawks; Carolina Hurricanes; ZSC Lions
- National team: Sweden
- NHL draft: 149th overall, 2009; Chicago Blackhawks
- Playing career: 2009–present

Marcus Viktor Krüger (born 27 May 1990) is a Swedish professional ice hockey player who is a centre and captain for Djurgårdens IF of the Swedish Hockey League (SHL). He was drafted by the Chicago Blackhawks in the fifth round, 149th overall, in the 2009 NHL entry draft. He is a two-time Stanley Cup champion with the Blackhawks in 2013 and 2015.

Before joining the Blackhawks, Krüger previously played for Stockholm-based Djurgårdens IF then of the Swedish Hockey League (SHL). Krüger represents Sweden in international play, helping his country capture a bronze medal at the junior level and a silver medal in senior international play.

== Playing career ==
=== Sweden ===
Krüger was announced as the first of four nominees for the 2009–10 Elitserien Rookie of the Year on 18 October 2009 after starting the season with five goals and 11 assists in just 13 games.

=== Chicago Blackhawks ===
Krüger signed a three-year contract with the Chicago Blackhawks in June 2010 but opted to stay with Djurgården during the first year of the contract He was later recalled from Djurgården to Chicago on 23 March 2011 to make his NHL debut that day in a 4–0 win against the Florida Panthers. Krüger made his Stanley Cup playoff debut in game two of the first round of the 2011 playoffs on 15 April in a 4–3 loss over the Presidents' Trophy-winning Vancouver Canucks and recorded his first career playoff point and NHL point with an assist on a Duncan Keith goal in a Blackhawks 5–0 win over the Canucks in game five on 21 April.

Krüger's first full season with the Blackhawks was in 2011–12, when he played in 71 games with the club, scoring nine goals and adding 17 assists. Krüger recorded his first career regular season assist and point on 8 October 2011 in a 5–2 win over the Dallas Stars on a goal scored by Dave Bolland. His first career goal came on 29 October in a 5–2 win over the Columbus Blue Jackets.

On 9 May 2013, in game five of the Western Conference Quarter-finals, Krüger scored his first career Stanley Cup playoff goal, which happened to be the game-winner and series-winner against Minnesota Wild goaltender Josh Harding. The Blackhawks eventually won the 2013 Stanley Cup after defeating the Boston Bruins in six games in the finals, with Krüger contributing three goals, two assists and five points in all 23 games during the team's run. After his playoff success with the team, Krüger signed a two-year extension with the Blackhawks on 12 July.

He scored eight goals and 20 assists in 81 games for Chicago during the 2013–14 season and seven goals, 10 assists and 17 points in 81 games during the 2014–15 season, respectively. On 19 May 2015, he scored the game-winning triple overtime away goal to tie the Western Conference finals 1–1 against the Anaheim Ducks. The Blackhawks would eventually defeat the Ducks in seven games in the Conference Finals before defeating the Tampa Bay Lightning in six games in the 2015 Stanley Cup Final, giving Krüger his second Stanley Cup.

On 11 September 2015, Krüger signed a one-year, 1.5 million dollar contract to stay with the Blackhawks for the 2015–16 season. On 17 December, Krüger dislocated his wrist in a game against the Edmonton Oilers. He was projected to miss at least four months while recovering from the injury. On 27 February 2016, the Blackhawks announced that Krüger would be switching his number to 22 in order for his new teammate acquired from the Winnipeg Jets, Andrew Ladd, to keep his traditional number 16. On 9 March, The Blackhawks signed Krüger to a three-year, $9.25 million contract extension that runs through the 2018–19 season.

In the 2016 off-season with Ladd signing with the New York Islanders in free agency, Krüger announced he would be switching his number from 22 back to his original number 16.

=== Carolina Hurricanes ===
After completing his seventh season with the Blackhawks, Krüger was long rumored as a candidate to be traded away due to considerable salary cap constraints. With a reported deal to the Vegas Golden Knights pre-dating the 2017 NHL Expansion Draft for draft considerations, Krüger surprisingly remained with Chicago through to the opening of free agency. On 2 July 2017, Krüger was dealt by the Blackhawks to the Golden Knights in exchange for future considerations. On 4 July 2017, Krüger was then moved on by the Golden Knights in a trade to the Carolina Hurricanes for a 5th-round pick in the 2018 NHL entry draft. Krüger was placed on injured reserve by the Hurricanes on 3 January 2018, and was placed on waivers on 8 February.

=== Return to Chicago ===
On 3 May 2018, Krüger was initially traded by the Hurricanes to the Arizona Coyotes along with a third-round pick in the 2018 NHL entry draft, in exchange for forward Jordan Martinook and a fourth-round pick in the 2018 NHL entry draft. On 12 July, Krüger was then traded by the Coyotes back to the Blackhawks along with prospect MacKenzie Entwistle, Jordan Maletta, and Andrew Campbell in a deal that sent the contract of Marián Hossa to the Coyotes, along with Vinnie Hinostroza, Jordan Oesterle and a third-round pick in the 2019 NHL entry draft.

On 20 February 2019, Krüger played his 500th NHL game in a 5–4 overtime win over the Detroit Red Wings.

=== ZSC Lions ===
Following the 2018–19 season, Krüger ended his nine-year career in the NHL, returning to Europe as a free agent in signing a two-year contract with Swiss club ZSC Lions of the NL on 5 July 2019. On 17 February 2021, Krüger was signed to an early one-year contract extension through to the end of the 2021–22 season. He scored 8 goals and 27 points in 45 regular season games, and later 3 goals and 6 points in 13 playoff games.

=== Return to Djurgårdens IF ===
After three seasons with the Swiss ZSC Lions, Krüger signed a two year contract with Djurgårdens IF, with an option for a further two seasons. Prior to his arrival, the club was relegated to the second-tier league, HockeyAllsvenskan. He was appointed team captain ahead of the 2022–23 season. During the 2022–23 regular season, Krüger scored 12 goals and 49 points in 50 games. Djurgårdens IF reached the league finals but lost the playoff series 3–4 to Modo Hockey, remaining in the second tier. In the 2023–24 season, Krüger missed parts of the regular season due to injury, appearing in 29 games and registering 25 points. During the season, in February 2024, Krüger used his option and his contract was extended through 2026. In the 2024 playoffs, he played 15 games and scored 2 goals and 10 points. Djurgården lost the finals in a 0–4 sweep against Brynäs IF. In the 2024–25 season, Krüger played 48 regular-season games, scoring 15 goals and 36 points. In the subsequent promotion playoffs, he scored 8 goals and 13 points in 16 games. Before the first game of the final series, the supporters of Djurgården honoured him with a tifo. Djurgårdens IF won the final playoff series against AIK, securing promotion to the Swedish Hockey League (SHL).

During the 2025–26 season, Krüger was limited by physical injuries, missing the first six games of the season. He completed the regular season with 15 points in 40 games. In January 2026, Krüger was granted a temporary leave of absence to attend the Chicago Blackhawks' centennial event in the United States. Djurgården finished ninth in the regular season standings, qualifying for the eighth-finals against Malmö Redhawks. Krüger appeared in the first game of the series but left the ice after four minutes due to an injury. He did not play the remainder of the postseason, and Djurgårdens IF was eliminated from the playoffs after losing the series 1–2. Following the expiration of his contract after the 2025–26 season, Krüger became an unrestricted free agent. As of mid-2026, he remains unsigned while evaluating his physical condition for continued professional play.

== International play ==
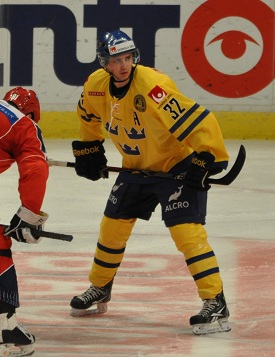

Medal record

Ice hockey

Representing Sweden

Winter Olympics
Silver medal – second place	2014 Sochi	

World Championships
Gold medal – first place	2017 Germany/France	
Silver medal – second place	2011 Slovakia	

World Junior Championships
Bronze medal – third place	2010 Canada	

Krüger represented Sweden three times in international play. At the junior level, he helped his country capture a bronze medal at the 2010 World Junior Championships. After graduating to the senior level, Krüger has played for Sweden twice, in 2011 (finishing with a silver medal) and 2012. He also represented Sweden in the 2014 Winter Olympics. After several injuries to the team's centremen, Krüger played on Sweden's first line in the tournament final against Canada, which the Swedes lost 3–0.

== Career statistics ==
=== Regular season and playoffs ===
			Regular season					Playoffs
Season	Team	League	GP	G	A	Pts	PIM	GP	G	A	Pts	PIM
2006–07	Djurgårdens IF	J18	18	5	11	16	10	—	—	—	—	—
2006–07	Djurgårdens IF	J18 Allsv	5	0	3	3	0	3	2	1	3	2
2007–08	Djurgårdens IF	J18	18	9	17	26	18	—	—	—	—	—
2007–08	Djurgårdens IF	J18 Allsv	4	2	3	5	4	7	3	8	11	6
2007–08	Djurgårdens IF	J20	22	3	13	16	16	7	5	3	8	0
2008–09	Djurgårdens IF	J20	34	9	30	39	24	6	1	5	6	2
2008–09	Djurgårdens IF	SEL	15	2	2	4	2	—	—	—	—	—
2009–10	Djurgårdens IF	SEL	38	11	20	31	14	16	3	7	10	6
2010–11	Djurgårdens IF	SEL	52	6	29	35	52	3	0	1	1	0
2010–11	Chicago Blackhawks	NHL	7	0	0	0	4	5	0	1	1	0
2011–12	Chicago Blackhawks	NHL	71	9	17	26	22	6	0	0	0	0
2012–13	Rockford IceHogs	AHL	34	8	14	22	24	—	—	—	—	—
2012–13	Chicago Blackhawks	NHL	47	4	9	13	24	23	3	2	5	2
2013–14	Chicago Blackhawks	NHL	81	8	20	28	36	19	1	3	4	6
2014–15	Chicago Blackhawks	NHL	81	7	10	17	32	23	2	2	4	4
2015–16	Chicago Blackhawks	NHL	41	0	4	4	24	7	0	1	1	0
2016–17	Chicago Blackhawks	NHL	70	5	12	17	34	4	0	1	1	2
2017–18	Carolina Hurricanes	NHL	48	1	5	6	28	—	—	—	—	—
2017–18	Charlotte Checkers	AHL	19	4	4	8	14	—	—	—	—	—
2018–19	Chicago Blackhawks	NHL	74	4	8	12	30	—	—	—	—	—
2019–20	ZSC Lions	NL	34	8	11	19	18	—	—	—	—	—
2020–21	ZSC Lions	NL	41	9	14	23	24	5	0	2	2	0
2021–22	ZSC Lions	NL	45	8	19	27	28	13	3	3	6	8
2022–23	Djurgårdens IF	Allsv	50	12	37	49	36	17	5	11	16	6
2023–24	Djurgårdens IF	Allsv	29	6	19	25	32	15	2	8	10	16
2024–25	Djurgårdens IF	Allsv	48	15	21	36	46	16	8	5	13	4
2025–26	Djurgårdens IF	SHL	40	5	10	15	8	1	0	0	0	0
SHL totals			145	24	61	85	76	20	3	8	11	6
NHL totals			520	38	85	123	234	87	6	10	16	14

=== International ===
Year	Team	Event	Result	GP	G	A	Pts	PIM
2010	Sweden	WJC	3rd place, bronze medalist(s)	6	0	6	6	2
2011	Sweden	WC	2nd place, silver medalist(s)	9	2	1	3	10
2012	Sweden	WC	6th	8	3	2	5	6
2014	Sweden	OG	2nd place, silver medalist(s)	6	0	0	0	4
2016	Sweden	WCH	3rd	4	0	0	0	0
2017	Sweden	WC	1st place, gold medalist(s)	10	0	3	3	6
2019	Sweden	WC	5th	8	2	1	3	2
2022	Sweden	OG	4th	5	0	0	0	0
Junior totals				6	0	6	6	2
Senior totals				50	7	7	14	28
