= Björknäshallen =

Indoor arena in Boden, Sweden

Coordinates: 65°49′40″N 21°40′30″E

- Interactive map of Björknäshallen
- Location: Boden, Sweden

Construction
- Opened: 1965

Tenants
- Bodens HF; Bodens BK (earlier)

Björknäshallen, is an indoor arena in Boden, Sweden. It was completed in 1965 and has now a capacity of 4,100 spectators, of which approximately 900 are seated. It is the home arena of the Bodens HF ice hockey team. It used to have a capacity of 5,000, but that was with only 228 seated. The attendance record before the increase in seats is 5,111 in 1969 when Bodens BK defeated IFK Luleå 8–5, and after the increase 4,500 when Bodens IK thrashed AIK 6-2 (using a temporary stand for approximately 400 people).
