= Johan Persson (ice hockey) =

Swedish ice hockey player

- Born: February 26, 1990 (age 35) Östersund, Sweden
- Height: 6 ft 0 in (183 cm)
- Weight: 207 lb (94 kg; 14 st 11 lb)
- Position: Forward
- Shoots: Right
- Allsv team Former teams: Mora IK; Färjestad BK; Timrå IK
- Playing career: 2008–present

Johan Persson (born February 26, 1990) is a Swedish professional ice hockey player. He is currently playing for Mora IK of the Swedish HockeyAllsvenskan.

Persson made his Swedish Hockey League debut playing with Färjestad BK during the 2015–16 SHL season.
