= Nobelhallen =

Indoor ice hockey rink in Karlskoga, Sweden

Coordinates: 59°20′12″N 14°31′13″E

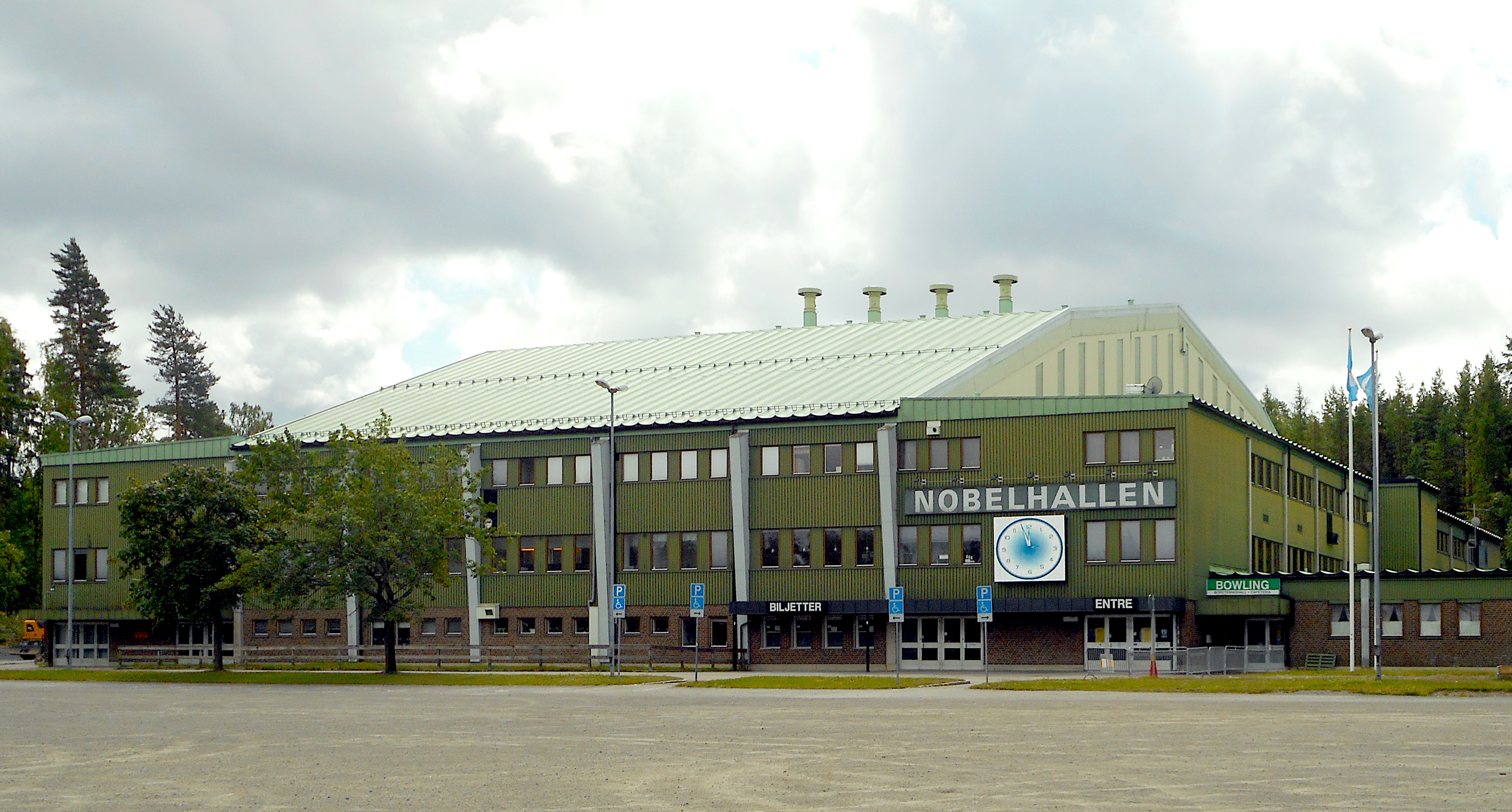
- Nobelhallen in July 2019
- Interactive map of Nobelhallen
- Location: Karlskoga, Sweden
- Type: Indoor arena

Construction
- Opened: 15 October 1972

Tenant
- BIK Karlskoga

Nobelhallen is an indoor arena in Karlskoga, Sweden. Its current capacity is 5,600 and it was built in 1971. It is the home arena of the ice hockey team BIK Karlskoga.

The first ice hockey game inside Nobelhallen, which replaced Boforsrinken, was played on 15 October 1972, a friendly game where KB Karlskoga lost, 5–9, against Djurgården IF. Nobelhallen hosted the 1979 World Junior Ice Hockey Championships.

Nobelhallen was also used as a music venue hosting concerts with among others Roxette, Kent, Scorpions, David Lee Roth and John Fogerty.

Nobelhallen was set to be renovated in 2021, but the multi-million Swedish krona-rebuild was postponed.

== See also ==
- List of indoor arenas in Sweden
- List of indoor arenas in Nordic countries
