= Plivit Arena =

Sports venue

Coordinates: 57.74748943476948°N 16.644445343062692°E

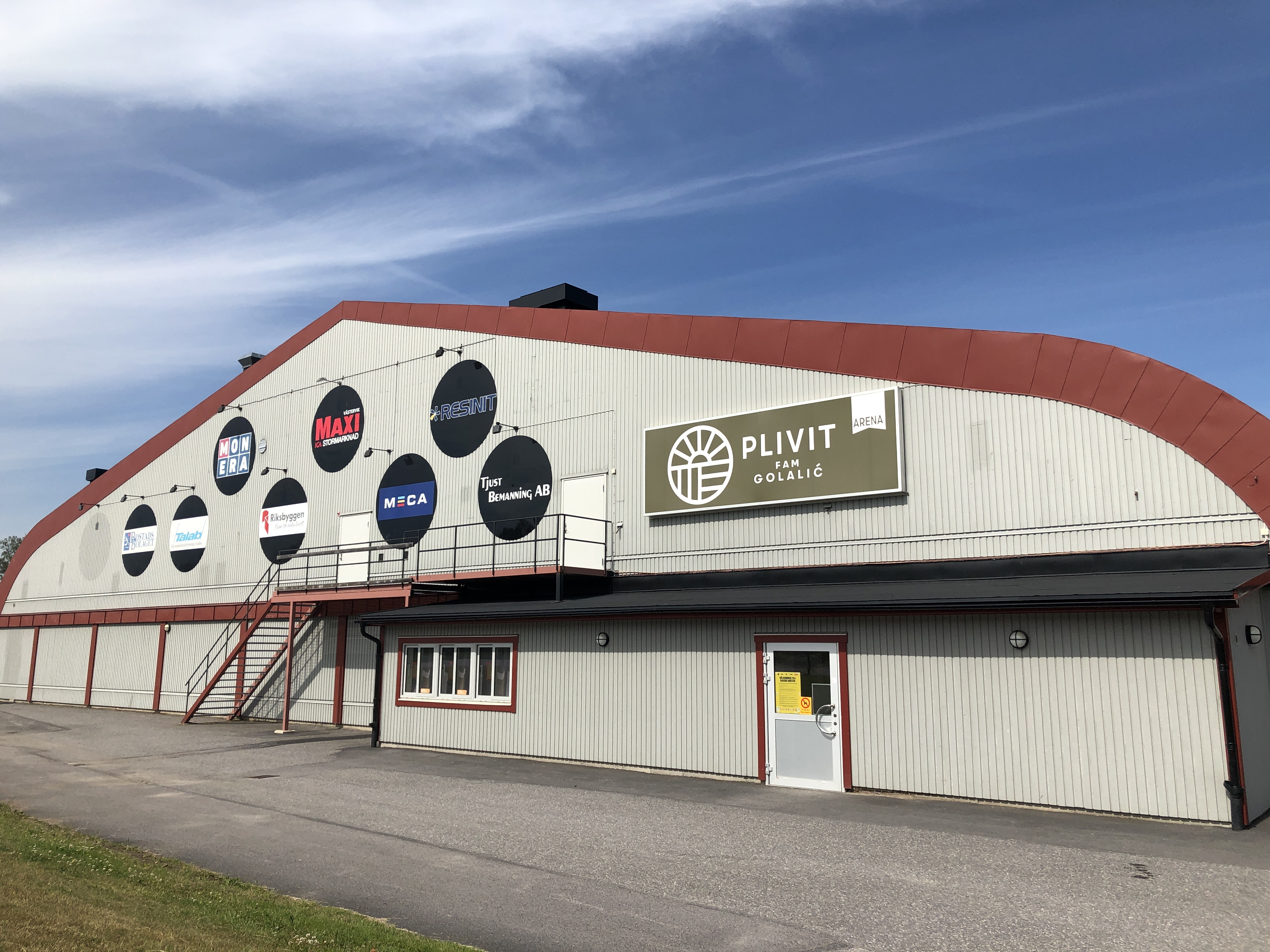
- Interactive map of Plivit Arena
- Former names: Tjusthallen; Plivit Trade-hallen
- Location: Västervik, Sweden
- Capacity: 2,500

Construction
- Opened: May 1984
- Renovated: 2015, 2017

Plivit Arena is an indoor arena in Västervik, Sweden. It is the home arena of the Västerviks IK, ice hockey teams. Its current capacity is 2,500 spectators.

== History ==
On March 14, 1984, Västervik municipality said yes to an ice rink in Västervik. A foundation was to be formed and VIK was to collect 70 000€, which they also succeeded in doing. In the end, there was great uncertainty ahead of the decisive vote in the council. There was a great risk that the ice rink would be voted out by the municipality's politicians. When the vote was over, the majority was 40–34 for an ice rink. 36 out of 38 Social Democrats voted yes, as did two Christian Democrats, a Centre Party member and a Liberals member. The debate about an ice rink in Västervik had been going on during every season for 15 years.

In May of the same year, the first sod was dug in the Bökensved area when municipal councilor Gunnar Oskarsson took a seat in an excavator and began construction. Already in the summer, large wooden beams rose over the old outdoor rink. The ice rink became the country's 154th ice rink and was named Tjusthallen.

On November 24, 1984, Tjusthallen was inaugurated. On the opening day, VIK crushed visiting Eksjö by a full 24–0 in front of around 1,400 cheering spectators. Johan Rampeltin became Tjusthallen's first official goal scorer. Already on November 9, the first official match was played in the hall when VIK beat Valdemarsvik 10–2 in a training match.

== Location ==
The arena is built in exactly the same place as the old outdoor rink once was. Plivit Arena lies on Bökensved in central Västervik. Most of the city's sports are also run on Bökensved, for exempel, the municipality's largest football club, Västerviks FF play their matches on one of the football pitch that has stands. There are also tennis courts, tennis hall, sports hall, swimming pool, gym and bowling alley.
