= Hägglunds Arena =

Ice sport arena in Örnsköldsvik, Sweden

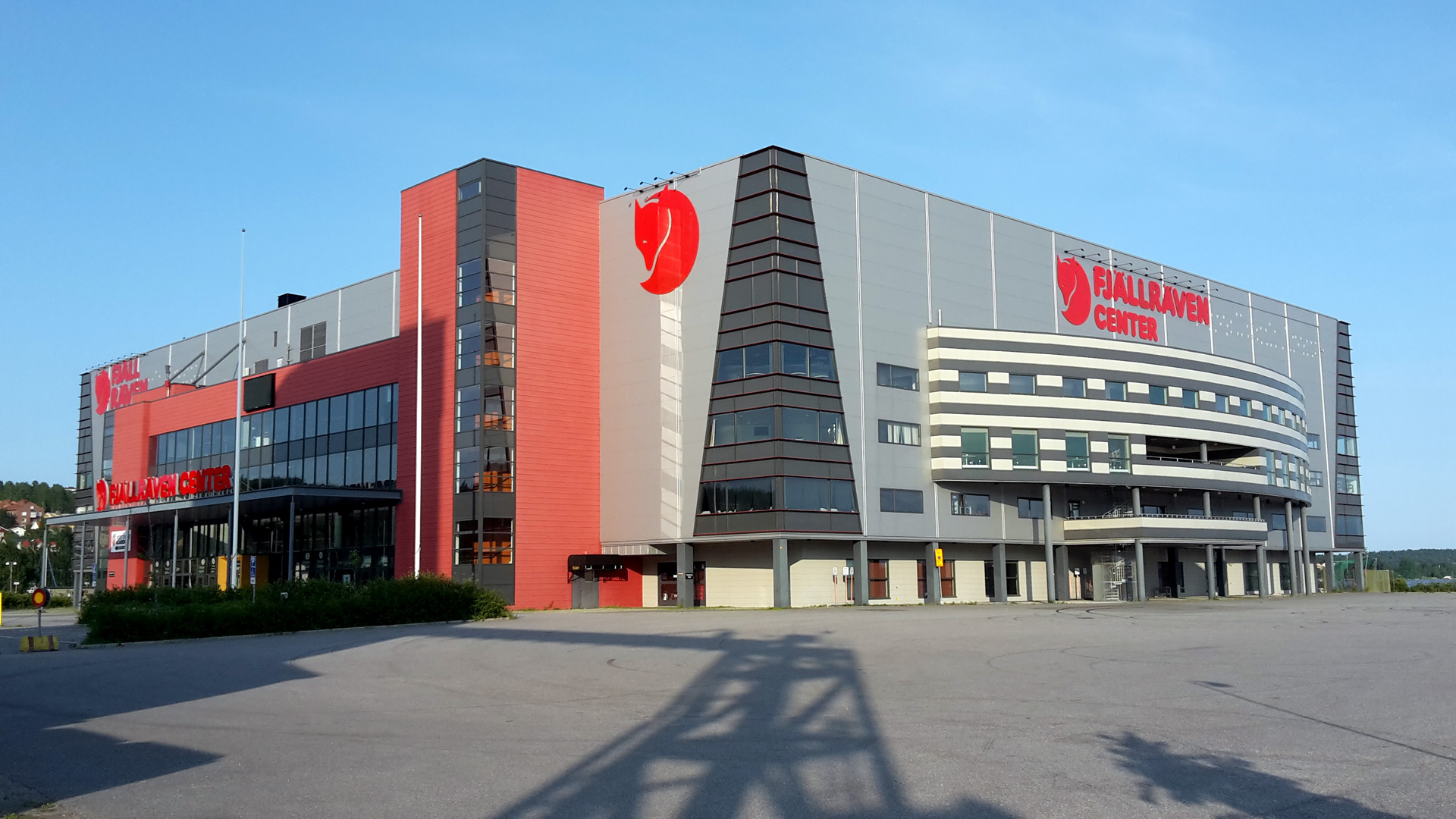
- Interactive map of Hägglunds Arena
- Former names: Swedbank Arena (2006–2009); Fjällräven Center (2010–2021)
- Location: Örnsköldsvik, Sweden
- Coordinates: 63°17′02″N 18°43′30″E
- Owner: Evenemangsarenan i Örnsköldsvik AB (subsidiary of Modo Hockey)
- Capacity: Ice hockey: 7,265; Concerts: 9,800

Construction
- Groundbreaking: 14 September 2004
- Opened: 26 August 2006

Tenant
- Modo Hockey (SHL) (2006–present)

Hägglunds Arena (formerly Swedbank Arena and Fjällräven Center) is an indoor sporting arena located in Örnsköldsvik, Sweden. The capacity of the arena is 7,265 for ice hockey games and 9,800 for concerts. The arena was opened on 26 August 2006.

== History ==
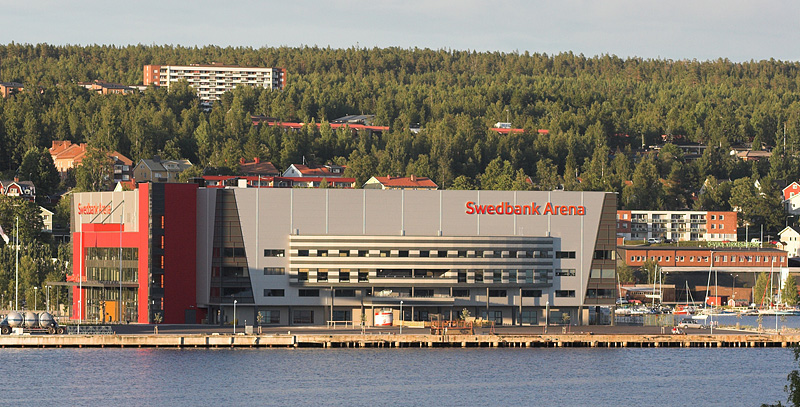
Swedbank Arena, now Hägglunds Arena, as seen from the nearby bay

Ground was broken for the arena on 14 September 2004. The arena is located in downtown Örnsköldsvik, by the harbor, and is surrounded by water on three sides. It contains three spectator levels: one suite level, and two general seating levels. Other features include a restaurant and six bars. The atrium features a light display called Active Light Field, which makes the atrium change colors.

A number of small capacity reductions were made between 2008 and 2015, including expanding the restaurant area and later also building a VIP bar on parts of the standing area, which lowered the original maximum capacity for ice hockey from 7,600 to at least 7,049 spectators. In October 2021, however, a new extended standing section was inaugurated, raising the capacity again to 7,115 spectators.

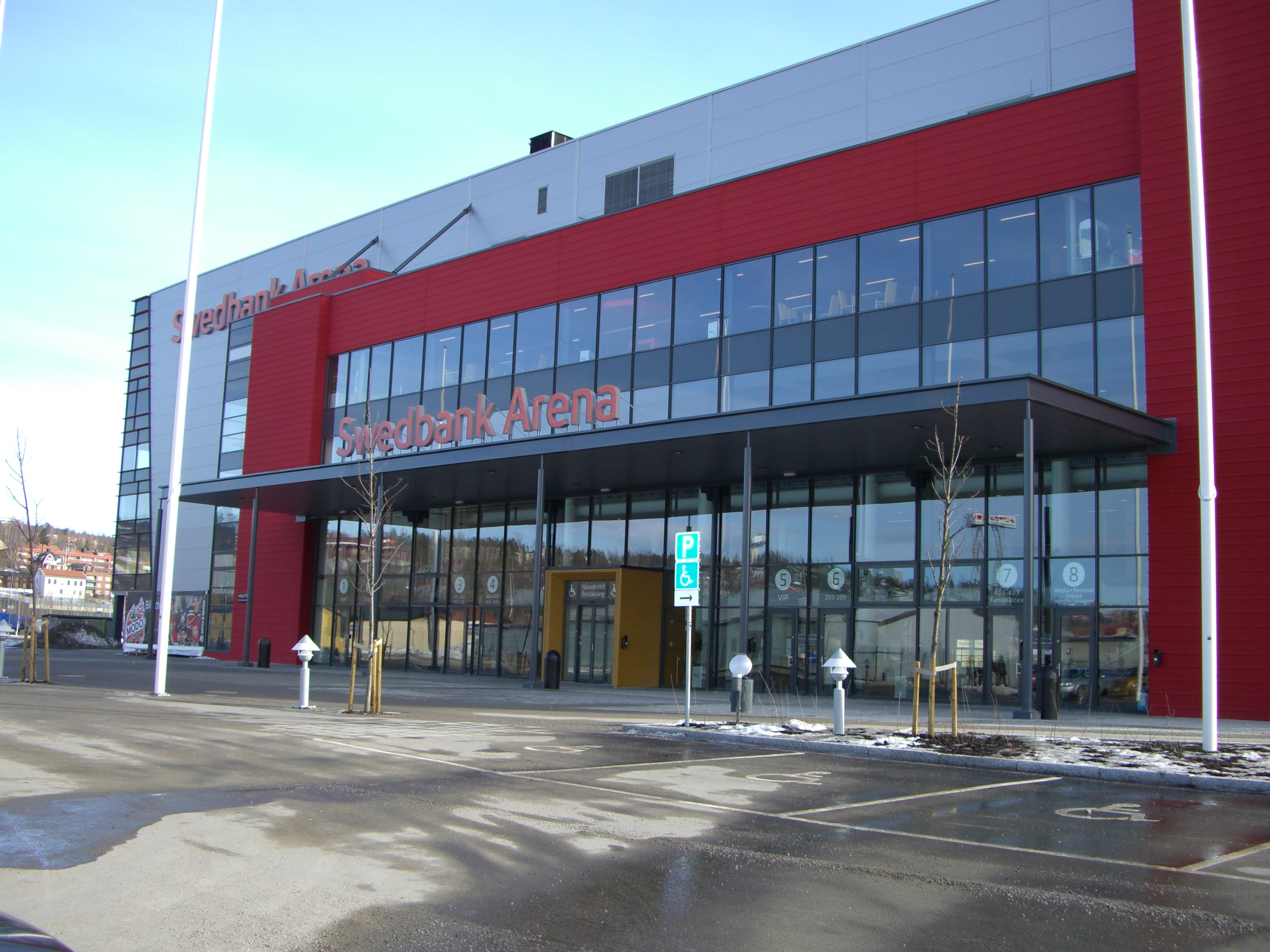
Swedbank Arena Outside

In November 2009, it was announced that Fjällräven acquired the naming rights, and from January 1, 2010 until August 31, 2021 the arena was called Fjällräven Center. The naming rights were then purchased by BAE Systems Hägglunds and the Swedish Bosch Rexroth subsidiary, who renamed the venue to Hägglunds Arena for a period of five or ten years, starting September 1, 2021.

== Events ==
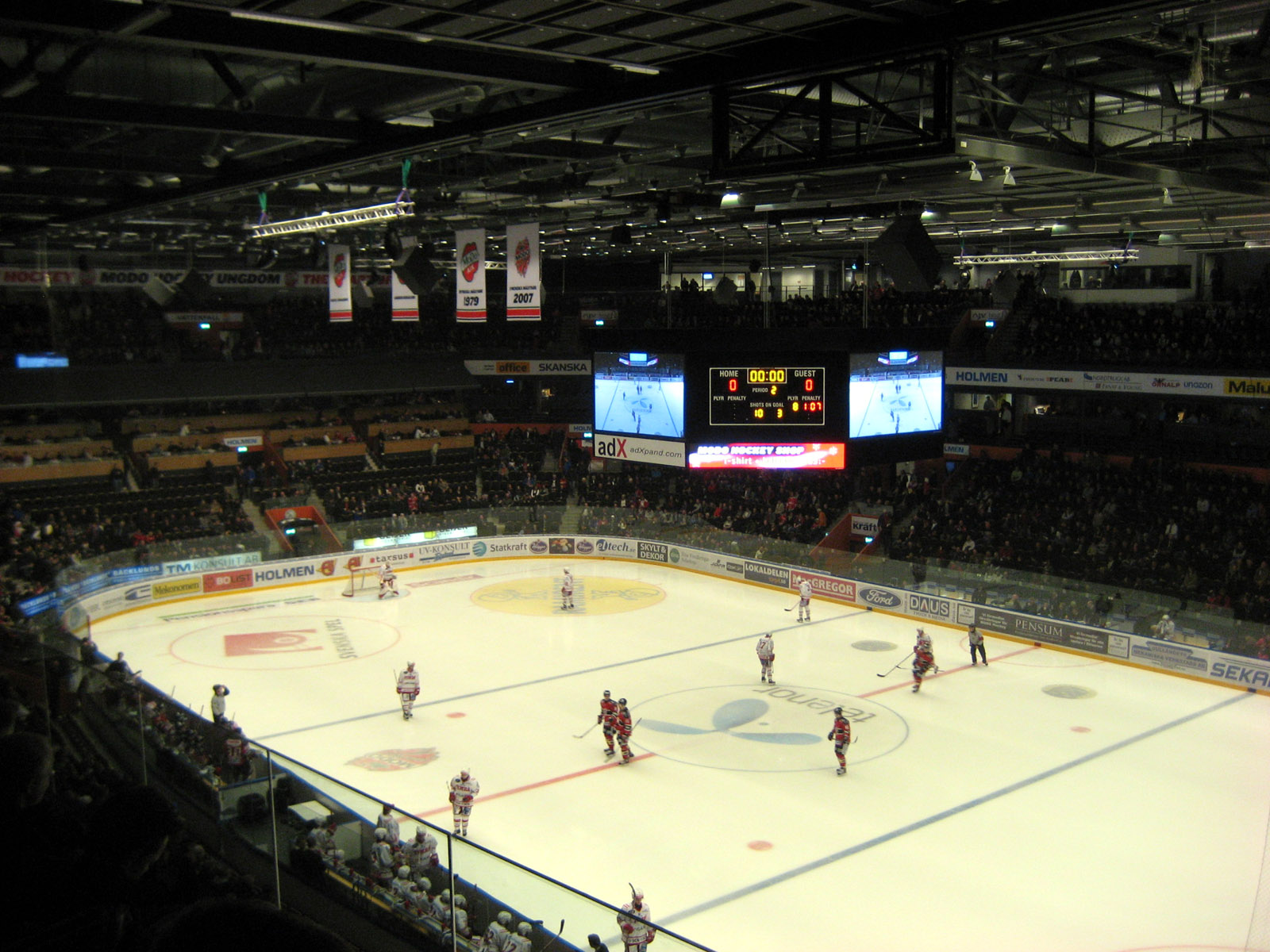
Interior of Swedbank Arena, now Hägglunds Arena, during an ice hockey game

It replaced the older Kempehallen as the home arena of the Modo Hockey ice hockey team. It also hosted the 2008 European Curling Championships and the 2019 IIHF World U18 Championships.

The third heat of Melodifestivalen 2007, the first heat of Melodifestivalen 2010, the fourth heat of Melodifestivalen 2014 and of Melodifestivalen 2018, as well as the semi-final of Melodifestivalen 2023 were all hosted at the arena. Other notable music acts include Takida, Tomas Ledin, Alice Cooper, Thin Lizzy, Michael W. Smith and Kent. The arena also unsuccessfully applied to host the Eurovision Song Contest in 2016 and 2024.

== See also ==
- List of indoor arenas in Sweden
- List of indoor arenas in Nordic countries
