= Dackehallen =

Sports venue in Tingsryd, Sweden

Coordinates: 56°31′49″N 14°58′57″E

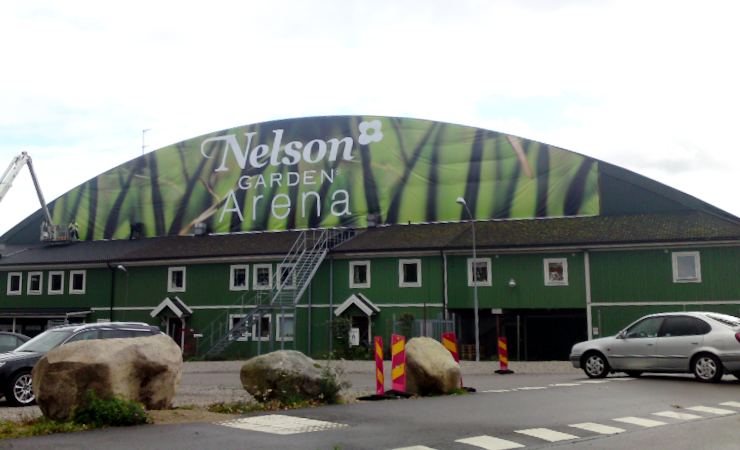
Nelson Garden Arena

Dackehallen (from 2011 until 2022 named Nelson Garden Arena) is an indoor arena in Tingsryd, Sweden. It was completed in 1969 and has a capacity of 3,400 spectators. Its current name was inaugurated in September 2011.
