= Scaniarinken =

Indoor sports arena in Sweden

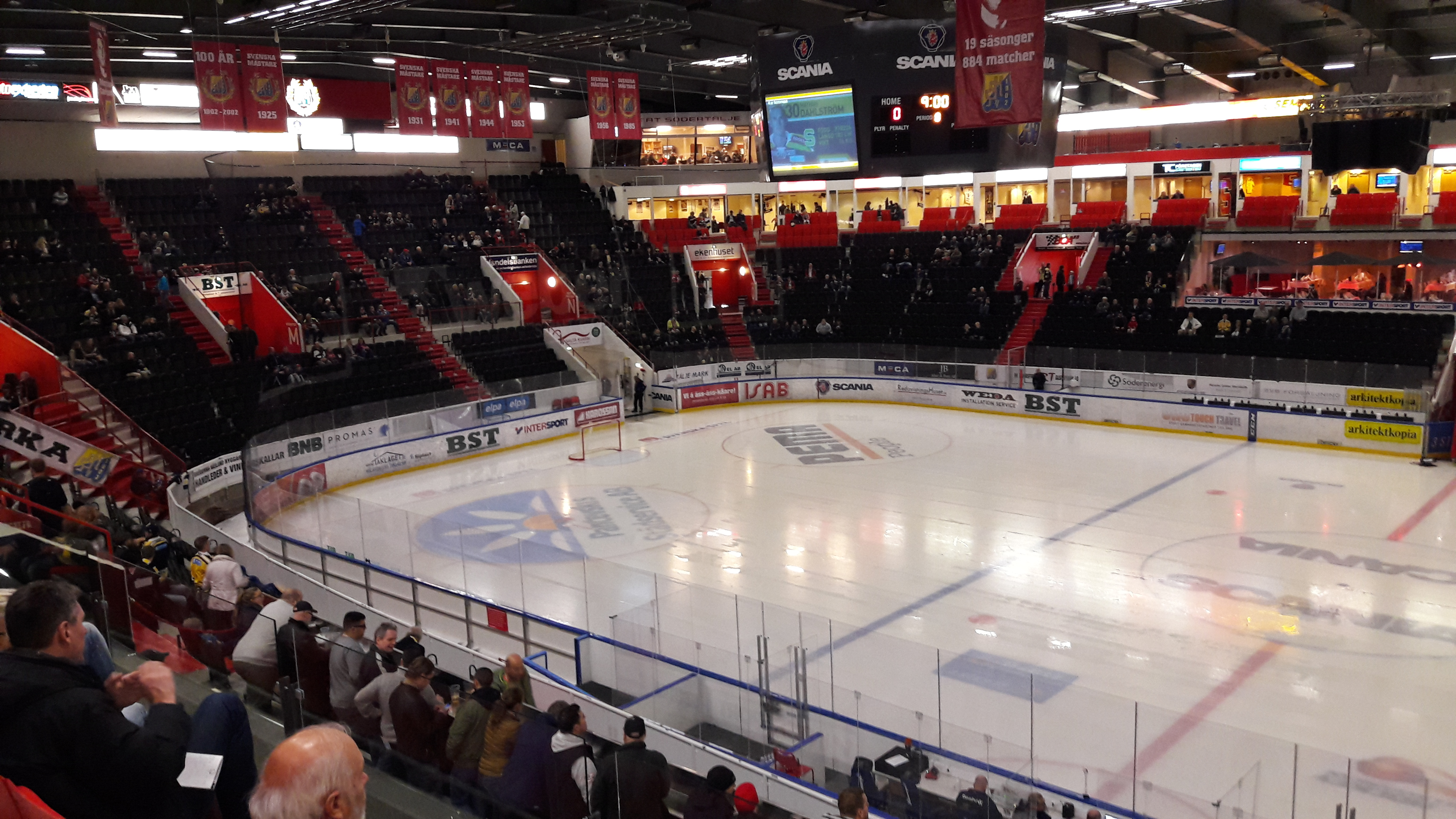
- The Scaniarinken interior 2016
- Interactive map of Scaniarinken
- Former names: AXA Sports Center (1970–2016); Södertälje Event Arena (1970–2016)
- Location: Genetaleden 1, Box 9114; 151 09 Södertälje; Sweden
- Coordinates: 59°11′22″N 17°34′13″E
- Owner: Södertälje Municipality
- Operator: Södertälje SK
- Capacity: Ice hockey: 6,200

Construction
- Opened: 2 October 1970
- Renovated: 2005
- Architect: Thelaus Arkitekter

Tenants
- Södertälje SK (SEL) (2005-present); Södertälje BBK (Damligan); Södertälje Kings (OBL)

Scaniarinken (formerly the AXA Sports Center) is an indoor sporting arena located in Södertälje, Sweden that was built and then opened on 2 October 1970 as Scaniarinken, with an ice hockey game where Södertälje SK defeated Djurgårdens IF, 5–2 The capacity of the arena is 6,200, but before it was renovated in 2005 it could host much larger numbers, with the record being 11,372 people. It is the home arena of the Södertälje SK ice hockey team and the Axa/Marlboro curling team.

The arena was reconstructed in 2005, and renamed from Scaniarinken to AXA Sports Center. In February 2016 the arena was renamed back to Scaniarinken as the 10-year title deal with Axa expired.

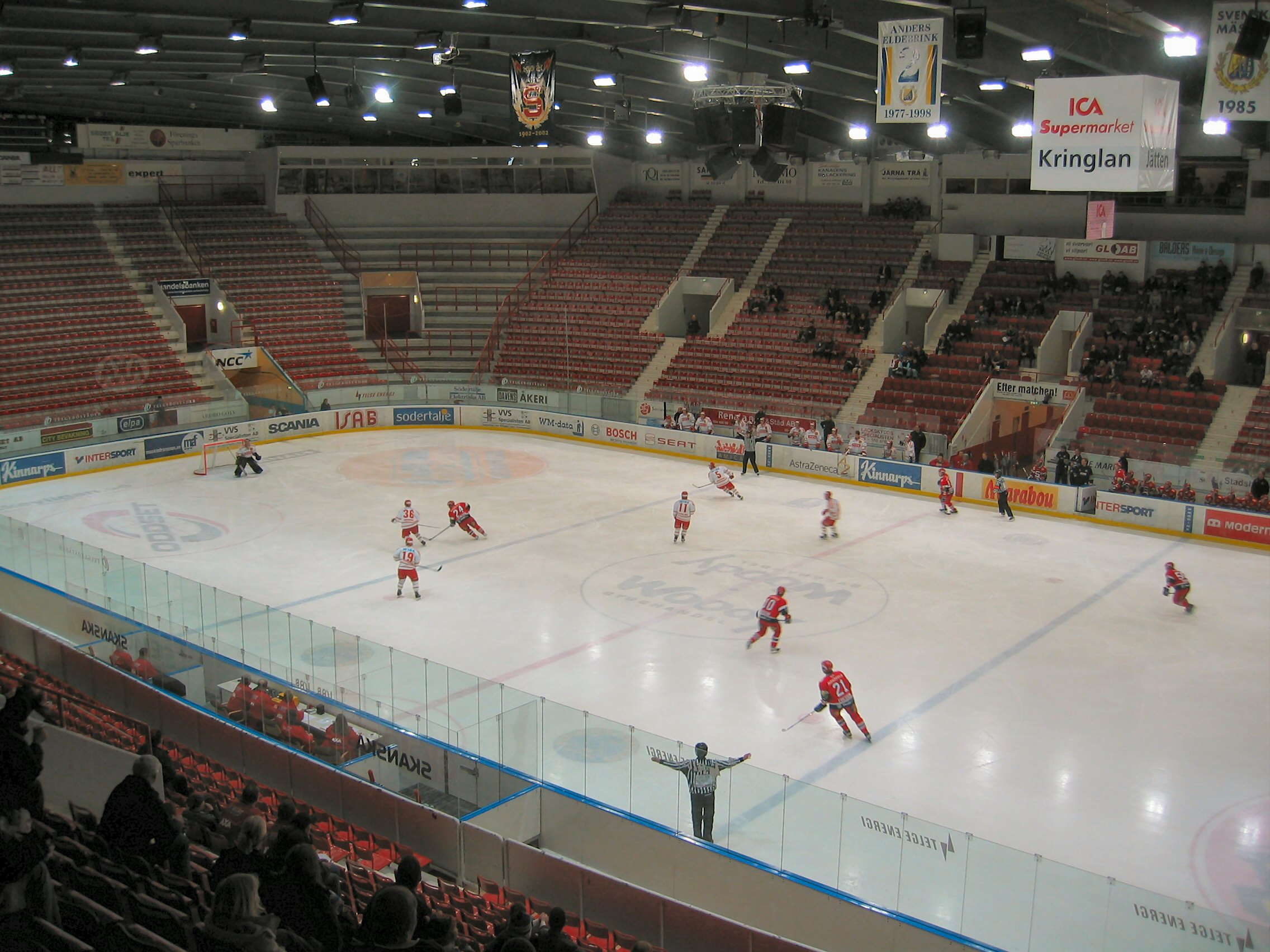
Interior of Scaniarinken in March 2004.
