= Visionite Arena =

Indoor ice hockey rink in Umeå, Sweden

Coordinates: 63°48′54″N 20°14′32″E

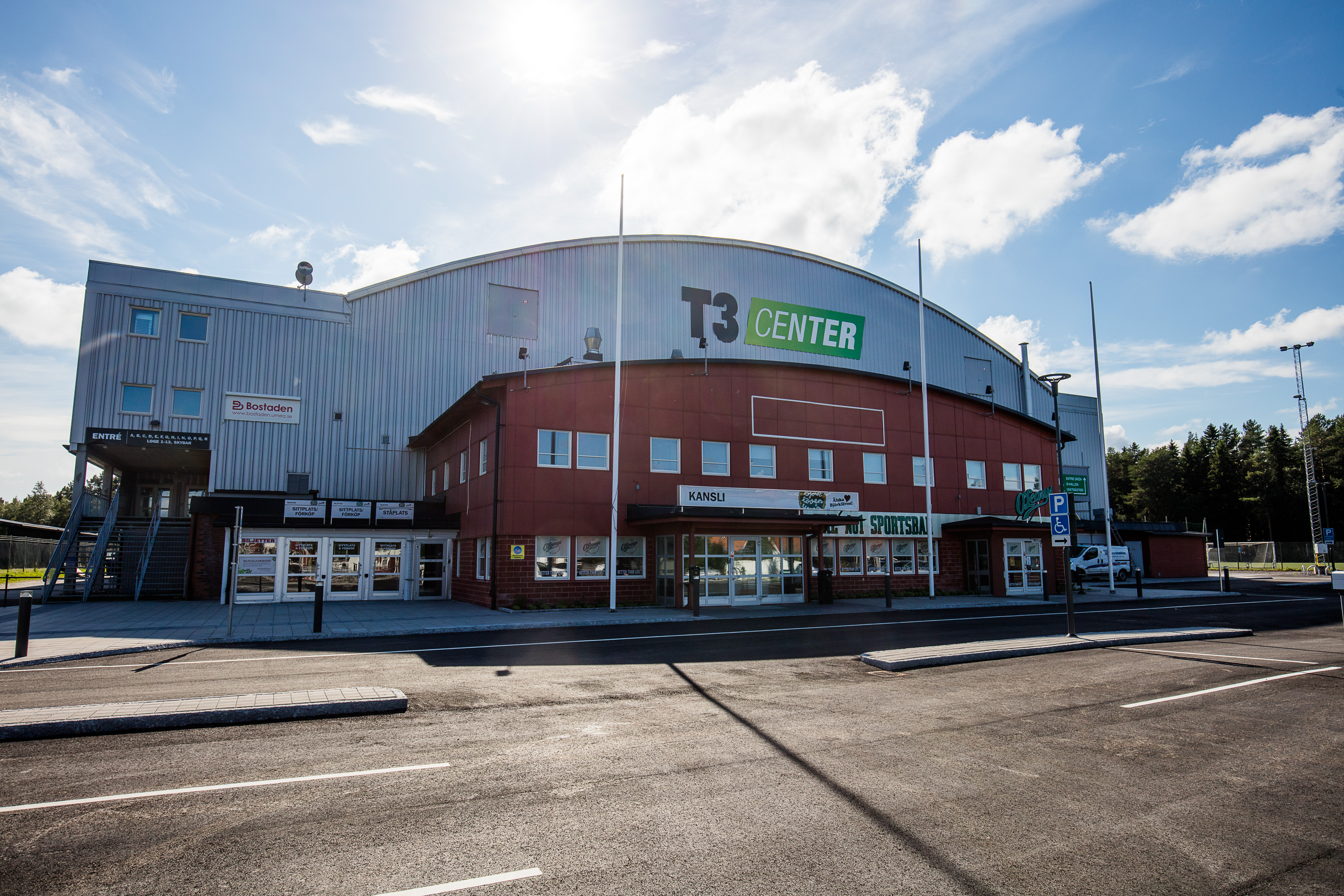
- Interactive map of Visionite Arena
- Full name: Visionite Arena
- Former names: A3 Arena; T3 Center; Umeå Arena; SkyCom Arena; Umeå ishall Winpos Arena
- Location: Umeå, Sweden
- Capacity: 5,400

Construction
- Opened: 17 December 1963
- Renovated: 2001

Visionite Arena is an indoor arena in Umeå, Sweden. It is the home arena of the IF Björklöven and Tegs SK ice hockey teams. Its current capacity is 5,400 spectators.

The arena was first opened on 17 December 1963 as Umeå ishall and rebuilt as Umeå Arena in 2001, which was the name until 2005. On 1 October 2008, the name was reverted to Umeå Arena after a new sponsor deal.

On 17 September 2013, the arena was renamed T3 Center after the Swedish telecommunication company T3 bought the naming rights for at least the following five seasons (through the 2017–18 season).

== See also ==
- List of indoor arenas in Sweden
- List of indoor arenas in Nordic countries
