= Upplands Bilforum Arena =

Indoor arena in Uppsala, Sweden

Coordinates: 59°52′48″N 17°39′26″E

Gränby Ishall
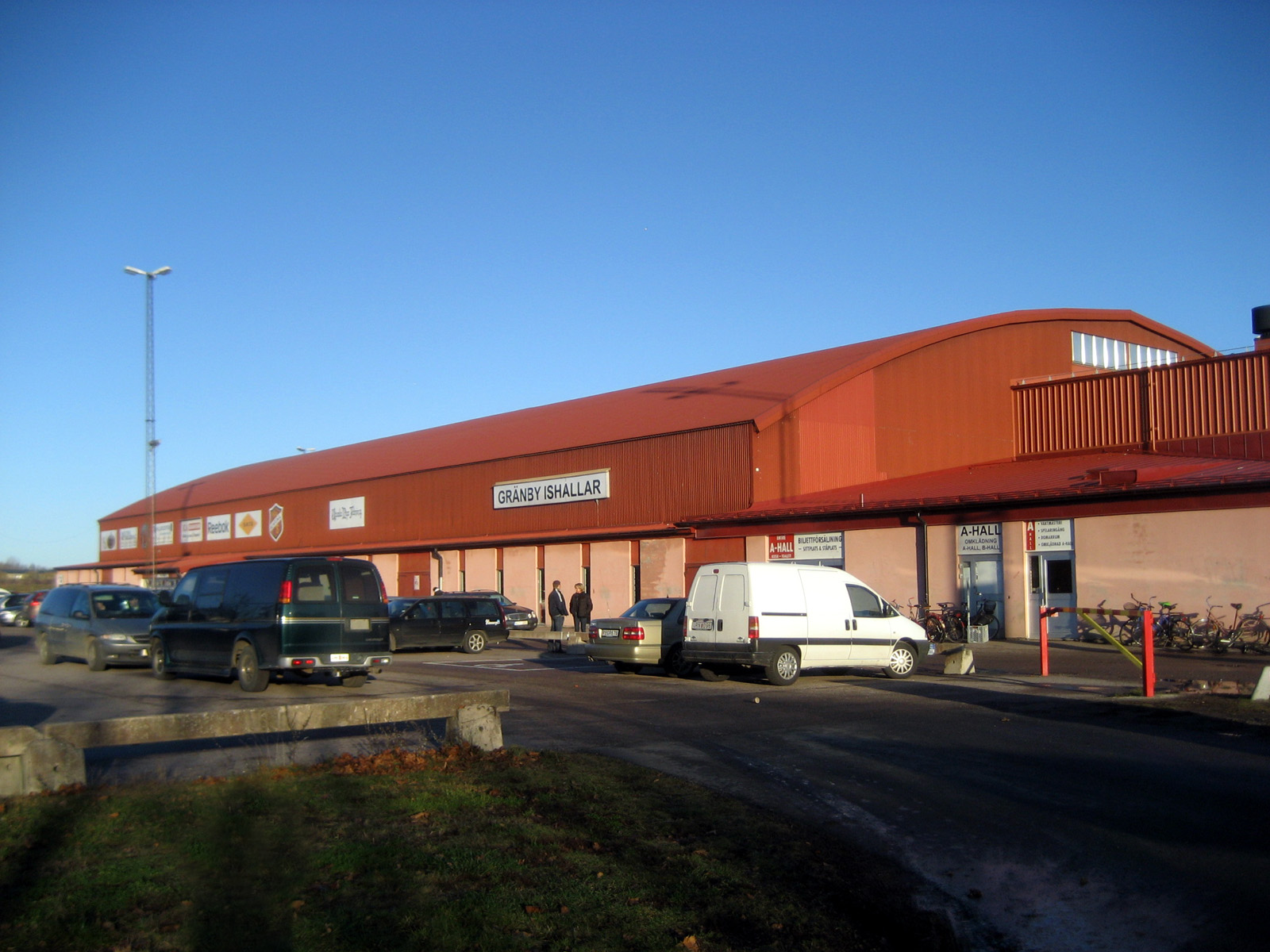
- Interactive map of Gränby Ishall
- Full name: Gränby Ishall
- Former names: Gränbyhallen (1974–2013), Zellout Arena (2009) Metallåtervinning Arena (2013–2016); Gränby Ishall (2016–2020)
- Location: Uppsala, Sweden
- Capacity: 2,800

Construction
- Groundbreaking: 1974
- Opened: 1974

Tenants
- Almtuna IS, Uppsala HC, Uppsala Skridskoklubb

Upplands Bilforum Arena is an indoor arena located in Uppsala, Sweden, and built in 1974. It consists of three arenas: "A-hallen", "B-hallen" and "C-hallen".

A-hallen is the biggest part of the arena and has a capacity of 2,800 spectators and is where Almtuna IS and Uppsala HC play their home games. B-hallen has a capacity of 350 spectators, and C-hallen has a capacity of 250. The arena opened in 1974 and was renovated following Almtuna IS's promotion to the second-tier league Allsvenskan (now named HockeyAllsvenskan), prior to the 2001–02 season. The current spectator record was set on 27 March 2010, when 2,916 spectators visited the arena to see Almtuna IS meet Södertälje SK in the Kvalserien qualification for the top-tier league Elitserien (now named the SHL).

On 25 November 2013 Metallåtervinning AB acquired the naming rights for the arena until the end of the 2015–16 season and renamed it "Metallåtervinning Arena".
