= Tingsryd =

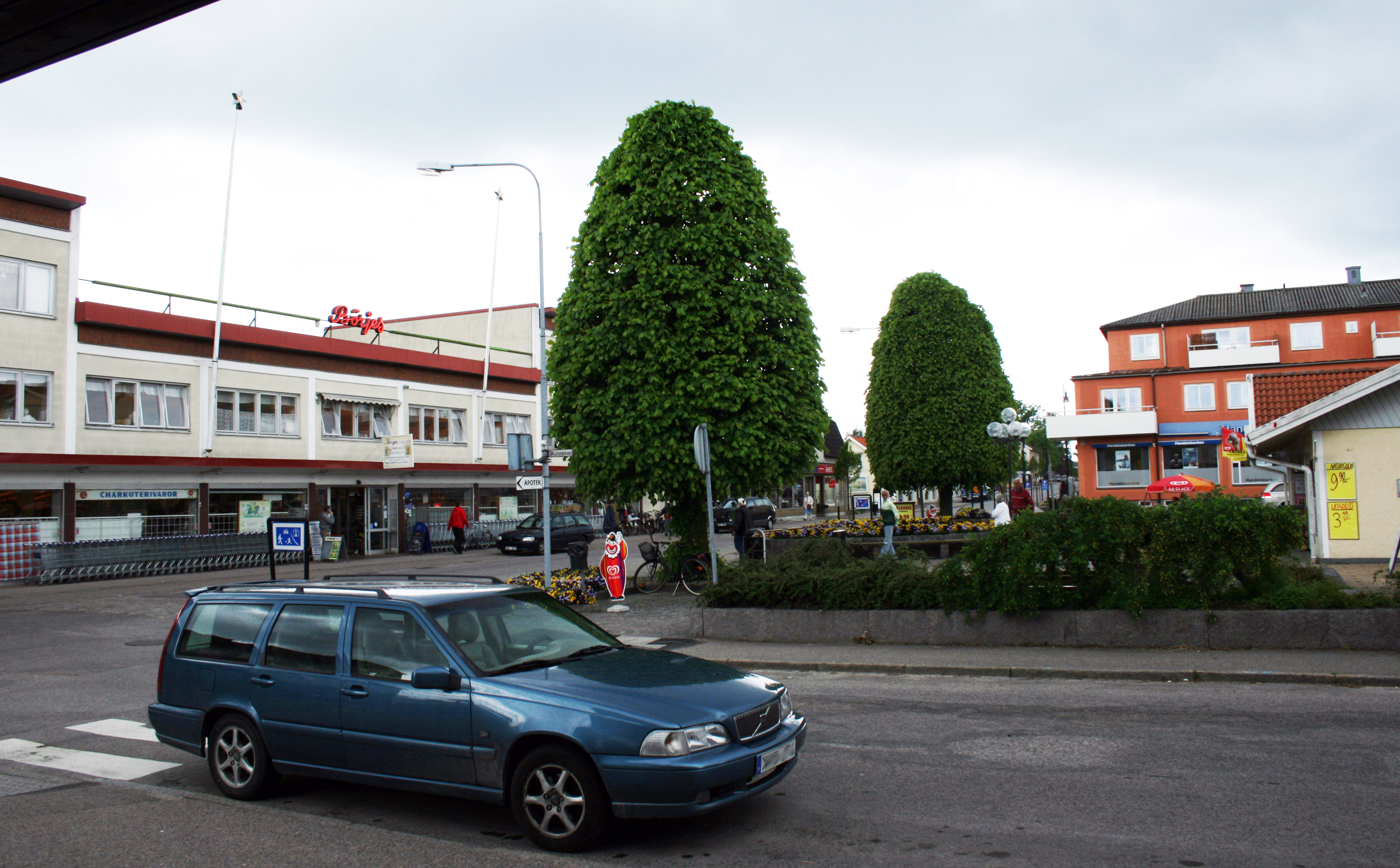
- Tingsryd Town Hall

- Coat of arms

- Location within Kronoberg Location within Sweden
- Coordinates: 56°31′50″N 14°58′37″E
- Country: Sweden
- Province: Småland
- County: Kronoberg County
- Municipality: Tingsryd Municipality

Area
  - Total: 3.54 km^{2} (1.37 sq mi)

Population (31 December 2010)
  - Total: 3,037
  - Density: 857/km^{2} (2,220/sq mi)
- Time zone: UTC+1 (CET)
  - Summer (DST): UTC+2 (CEST)

Tingsryd is a locality and the seat of Tingsryd Municipality, Kronoberg County, Sweden, with 3,037 inhabitants in 2010.

== Sister cities ==
- Lindström - Minnesota, United States
