= 2007 World Junior Ice Hockey Championships rosters =

== Top Division ==
=== Group A ===
==== Canada ====
Pos.	No.	Player	Team	NHL rights
GK	1	Carey Price	(United States) Tri-City Americans	Montreal Canadiens
GK	31	Leland Irving	(United States) Everett Silvertips	Calgary Flames
D	3	Karl Alzner	(Canada) Calgary Hitmen
D	4	Ryan Parent	(Canada) Guelph Storm	Philadelphia Flyers
D	5	Kris Letang	(Canada) Val-d'Or Foreurs	Pittsburgh Penguins
D	6	Luc Bourdon	(Canada) Moncton Wildcats	Vancouver Canucks
D	10	Kris Russell	(Canada) Medicine Hat Tigers	Columbus Blue Jackets
D	14	Marc Staal	(Canada) Sudbury Wolves	New York Rangers
D	26	Cody Franson	(Canada) Vancouver Giants	Nashville Predators
F	7	Steve Downie	(Canada) Peterborough Petes	Philadelphia Flyers
F	9	Andrew Cogliano	(United States) University of Michigan Wolverines	Edmonton Oilers
F	11	Marc-André Cliche	(United States) Lewiston Maineiacs	New York Rangers
F	12	Kenndal McArdle	(Canada) Vancouver Giants	Florida Panthers
F	15	Darren Helm	(Canada) Medicine Hat Tigers	Detroit Red Wings
F	17	Brad Marchand	(Canada) Halifax Mooseheads	Boston Bruins
F	19	James Neal	(Canada) Plymouth Whalers	Dallas Stars
F	20	Bryan Little	(Canada) Barrie Colts	Atlanta Thrashers
F	22	Daniel Bertram	(United States) Boston College Eagles	Chicago Blackhawks
F	23	Ryan O'Marra	(Canada) Saginaw Spirit	Edmonton Oilers
F	27	Tom Pyatt	(Canada) Saginaw Spirit	New York Rangers
F	29	Jonathan Toews	(United States) North Dakota Fighting Sioux
F	38	Sam Gagner	(Canada) London Knights

==== Slovakia ====
Pos.	No.	Player	Team
GK	99	Tomáš Hiadlovský	(Slovakia) HK SR 20 Puchov
GK	1	Branislav Konrád
GK	2	Jakub Macek
GK	30	Vladimír Kováč
D	4	Juraj Valach
D	3	Adam Beňa	(Slovakia) HK SR 20 Puchov
D	5	Matej Cuník
D	6	Michael Korenko
D	7	Martin Grundling
D	9	Tomáš Brňák
D	28	Juraj Mikuš	(Slovakia) HK SR 20 Puchov
D	10	Tomáš Magusin
D	15	Matej Hamrák
D	16	Vladimír Mihálik
D	24	Martin Klucar
F	11	Jakub Drábek
F	12	Juraj Mikuš
F	13	Mário Bližňák	(Canada) Vancouver Giants
F	14	Tomáš Záborský
F	17	Marcel Haščák
F	8	Tomáš Marcinko	(Canada) Barrie Colts
F	18	Dávid Buc
F	21	Andrej Themár
F	19	Július Šinkovič	(Canada) Val-d'Or Foreurs
F	22	Dávid Skokan
F	23	Marek Bartánus
F	25	Ondřej Mikula
F	26	Michael Klejna
F	27	Daniel Dvorčák
F	29	Jakub Rumpel

==== Sweden ====
Pos.	No.	Player	Team
GK	30	Jhonas Enroth	(Sweden) Södertälje SK
GK	1	Joel Gistedt
GK	35	Mattias Modig
GK	99	Johan Thalberg	(Sweden) VIK Västerås HK
D	5	Niclas Andersén	(Sweden) Brynäs IF
D	4	Linus Morin
D	3	Alexander Hellström
D	2	Patrik Nevalainen
D	6	Jonas Junland
D	7	Alexander Ribbenstrand	(Sweden) Djurgårdens IF
D	8	Jonas Ahnelöv
D	22	Daniel Rahimi
D	28	Niklas Hjalmarsson
F	9	Tom Wandell
F	10	Patric Hörnqvist	(Sweden) Djurgårdens IF
F	11	Mattias Ritola
F	15	Patrik Berglund	(Sweden) VIK Västerås HK
F	23	Robin Figren	(Canada) Edmonton Oil Kings
F	12	Andreas Thuresson
F	16	Martin Johansson
F	17	Alexander Sundström
F	18	Niclas Bergfors
F	19	Nicklas Bäckström
F	20	Magnus Isaksson
F	21	Andreas Engqvist	(Sweden) Djurgårdens IF
F	24	Fredrik Pettersson
F	25	Patrik Zackrisson
F	26	Linus Omark
F	27	Robin Lindqvist
F	29	Andreas Molinder

==== United States ====
Pos.	No.	Player	Hometown (Team in 2007)
GK	37	Jeff Zatkoff	(United States) Chesterfield, Mich. (Miami)
GK	30	Jeff Frazee	(United States) Burnsville, Minn. (Minnesota)
D	2	Kyle Lawson (Alternate Captain)	(United States) New Hudson, Mich. (Notre Dame)
D	3	Jack Johnson	(United States) Burnsville, Minn. (Minnesota)
D	4	Taylor Chorney (Captain)	(United States) Hastings, Minn. (North Dakota)
F	5	Blake Geoffrion	(United States) Brentwood, Tenn. (Wisconsin)
D	6	Erik Johnson	(United States) Bloomington, Minn. (Minnesota)
F	8	Kyle Okposo	(United States) St. Paul, Minn. (Minnesota)
F	9	Nathan Gerbe	(United States) Oxford, Mich. (Boston College)
F	11	Jim Fraser (Alternate Captain)	(United States) Port Huron, Mich. (Harvard)
F	12	James van Riemsdyk	(United States) Middletown, N.J. (U.S. Under-18 Team)
F	16	Mike Carman	(United States) Apple Valley, Minn. (Minnesota)
D	17	Jamie McBain	(United States) Faribault, Minn. (Wisconsin)
F	18	Justin Abdelkader	(United States) Muskegon, Mich. (Michigan State)
F	19	Ryan Stoa	(United States) Bloomington, Minn. (Minnesota)
F	20	Jack Skille	(United States) Madison, Wis. (Wisconsin)
F	21	Bill Sweatt	(United States) Elburn, Ill. (Colorado College)
D	22	Brian Lee	(United States) Moorhead, Minn. (North Dakota)
D	23	Sean Zimmerman	(United States) Denver, Colo. (Spokane Chiefs)
F	24	Trevor Lewis	(United States) Murray, Utah (Owen Sound Attack)
F	27	Patrick Kane	(United States) Buffalo, N.Y. (London Knights)
F	88	Peter Mueller	(United States) Bloomington, Minn. (Everett Silvertips)

Original roster from insidecollegehockey.com

==== Germany ====
Pos.	No.	Player	Team
G	1	Sebastian Stefaniszin	Eisbaren Berlin
G	2	Timo Pielmeier	Kolner Haie
D	3	Christopher Fischer	Heilbronner EC
D	4	Benedikt Anton Kohl	Heilbronner EC
F	5	Felix Schutz	St. John's Sea Dogs
D	6	Christopher Giebe	North Iowa Outlaws
D	7	Stefan Langwieder	Portland Winter Hawks
F	9	Christopf Gawlik	Eisbaren Berlin
F	10	Andre Schietzold	Heilbronner EC
F	11	Patrick Buzas	Augsburger Panther
F	13	Thomas Pielmeier	Numberg Ice Tigers
F	14	Matthias Potthoff	Iserlohner Roosters
F	16	Marcel Muller	Eisbaren Berlin
D	17	Florian Ondruschka	Numberg Ice Tigers
F	19	Philip Gogulla	Kolner Haie
F	20	Constantin Braun	Eisbaren Berlin
D	21	Henry Martens	Kolner Haie
F	23	Elia Ostwald	Eisbaren Berlin
D	24	Rene Kramer	Eisbaren Berlin
F	26	Alexander Weiss	Eisbaren Berlin
D	27	Korbinian Holzer	EV Regensburg
F	29	Christian Wichert	EV Landsberg

=== Group B ===
==== Finland ====
Pos.	No.	Player	Team

==== Czech Republic ====
Pos.	No.	Player	Team

==== Belarus ====
Pos.	No.	Player	Team

== See also ==
- 2007 World Junior Ice Hockey Championships
