= 2007 World Junior Ice Hockey Championships =

2007 IIHF World Junior Championship

Tournament details
- Host country: Sweden
- Venue(s): Ejendals Arena and FM Mattsson Arena (in 2 host cities)
- Dates: 26 December 2006 – 5 January 2007
- Teams: 10

Final positions
- Champions: Canada (13th title)
- Runners-up: Russia
- Third place: United States
- Fourth place: Sweden

Tournament statistics
- Games played: 31
- Goals scored: 173 (5.58 per game)
- Attendance: 63,493 (2,048 per game)
- Scoring leader(s): (United States) Erik Johnson (Finland) Mikko Lehtonen (10 points)

Awards
- MVP: (Canada) Carey Price

The 2007 World Junior Ice Hockey Championships (2007 WJHC) was the 2007 edition of the Ice Hockey World Junior Championship and was held in Mora and Leksand, Sweden between December 26, 2006 and January 5, 2007. The venues were FM Mattsson Arena in Mora, and Ejendals Arena in Leksand. The total attendance was a significant drop off from the 325,000-plus visitors at the previous World Juniors in British Columbia, Canada.

For 2007, the tournament round-robin format was changed from previous years to resemble more closely the format used in the National Hockey League. Teams now earned three points for a win in regulation, while teams winning in overtime would still receive two points. Teams losing in overtime would receive one point, and teams losing in regulation get none. During the round-robin portion of the tournament, a five-minute, four-on-four sudden-victory overtime would be played, while the knockout games and the gold medal game would use full-strength, ten- and twenty-minute sudden-victory overtimes, respectively. If the game remained tied after overtime, an NHL-style shootout (with three skaters instead of five, as per other international competitions) would be held.

Canada won its third consecutive gold medal, capping an undefeated tournament with a 4–2 victory over Russia in the gold medal game. The world championship for Canada was also their first on European ice in a decade; the Canadians had not won a World Junior gold medal in Europe since 1997 in Geneva, Switzerland, when they defeated the United States in the gold medal game.

Canadian goaltender Carey Price was named tournament MVP, garnering a 1.14 goals against average (GAA).

== Top Division ==
=== Venues ===
Ejendals Arena Capacity: 7,650	FM Mattsson Arena Capacity: 4,500
Sweden – Leksand	Sweden – Mora

=== Preliminary round ===
All times local (UTC+1).

==== Group A ====
Pos	Team	Pld	W	OTW	OTL	L	GF	GA	GD	Pts	Qualification
1	Canada	4	4	0	0	0	14	4	+10	12	Semifinals
2	Sweden (H)	4	2	0	1	1	11	9	+2	7	Quarterfinals
3	United States	4	1	1	1	1	13	11	+2	6	Quarterfinals
4	Germany	4	1	1	0	2	8	9	−1	5	Relegation round
5	Slovakia	4	0	0	0	4	6	19	−13	0	Relegation round

Source: IIHF
(H) Host

26 December 2006; 15:00	Germany	2–1 OT (1–0, 0–0, 0–1) (OT: 1–0)	United States	Ejendals Arena, Leksand; Attendance: 2,462

Game reference
Giebe 13:45 (PP); Müller 61:51 / Goals / Mueller 48:56 (PP)

26 December 2006; 19:00	Sweden	0–2 (0–1, 0–1, 0–0)	Canada	Ejendals Arena, Leksand; Attendance: 7,650

Game reference
Goals / Bourdon 14:22 (PP); Marchand 19:12 (PP)

27 December 2006; 19:00	Slovakia	2–4 (1–2, 1–0, 0–2)	Germany	Ejendals Arena, Leksand; Attendance: 495

Game reference
Mikúš 11:52 (PP2); Korenko 25:41 (PP) / Goals / Ondruschka 03:08; Schütz 08:08; Kramer 43:23; Gawlik 44:13 (PP)

27 December 2006; 19:30	Canada	6–3 (2–0, 1–2, 3–1)	United States	FM Mattsson Arena, Mora; Attendance: 3,539

Game reference
Carey Price	Goalies	Jeff Zatkoff	Referee: (Switzerland) Danny Kurmann; Linesmen: (Czech Republic) Petr Blumel (Sweden) Leo Takula
Downie (Letang, Bourdon) – 14:43; Pyatt (Franson, Russell) –17:33 (PP); Toews (Pyatt) – 21:55 (PP); Toews – 49:13 (PS); Helm – 58:17; Helm (Downie) – 59:03 (ENG) / Goals / E. Johnson (Chorney) – 22:24; Carman (Sweatt)– 26:12; Sweatt (Skille) – 53:50			Referee: (Switzerland) Danny Kurmann; Linesmen: (Czech Republic) Petr Blumel (Sweden) Leo Takula
28 min	Penalties	18 min	Referee: (Switzerland) Danny Kurmann; Linesmen: (Czech Republic) Petr Blumel (Sweden) Leo Takula
26	Shots	35	Referee: (Switzerland) Danny Kurmann; Linesmen: (Czech Republic) Petr Blumel (Sweden) Leo Takula

28 December 2006; 19:30	Slovakia	3–6 (2–2, 1–1, 0–3)	Sweden	FM Mattsson Arena, Mora; Attendance: 4,037

Game reference
Mihalík 15:13; Mikula 19:33 (PP); Mikúš 34:56 (PP) / Goals / Berglund 04:42; Omark 16:59; Hjalmarsson 21:40 (PP); Johansson 44:15 (PP); Hörnqvist 48:41; Lindqvist 49:05

29 December 2006; 19:00	Germany	1–3 (0–1, 1–1, 0–1)	Canada	Ejendals Arena, Leksand; Attendance: 1,284

Game reference
Schütz 32:26 (PP2) / Goals / Russell 07:04; Downie 34:42 (PP); Russell 50:34

30 December 2006; 17:00	United States	6–1 (2–0, 2–0, 2–1)	Slovakia	Ejendals Arena, Leksand; Attendance: 789

Game reference
Kane 06:51; J. Johnson 14:45 (PP); Kane 24:15; E. Johnson 29:00 (PP); Mueller 41:36 van Riemsdyk 56:07 / Goals / Mikus 49:46

30 December 2006; 17:00	Sweden	3–1 (1–0, 1–1, 1–0)	Germany	FM Mattsson Arena, Mora; Attendance: 3,801

Game reference
Lindqvist 03:25 (PP); Isaksson 26:42; Sundström 52:05 / Goals / Fischer 21:23 (PP2)

31 December 2006; 13:00	Canada	3–0 (2–0, 1–0, 0–0)	Slovakia	Ejendals Arena, Leksand; Attendance: 1,434

Game reference
Russell 05:36; Russell 08:52 (PP2); Downie 33:05 (PP) / Goals

31 December 2006; 17:00	United States	3–2 OT (0–0, 2–1, 0–1) (OT: 1–0)	Sweden	Ejendals Arena, Leksand; Attendance: 4,297

Game reference
Kane 31:50; Stoa 33:25; J. Johnson 63:16 (PP) / Goals / Thuresson 27:11 (SH); Pettersson 59:46

==== Group B ====
Pos	Team	Pld	W	OTW	OTL	L	GF	GA	GD	Pts	Qualification
1	Russia	4	4	0	0	0	20	3	+17	12	Semifinals
2	Finland	4	2	0	0	2	13	11	+2	6 (Note: Finland 6–2 Czech Republic)	Quarterfinals
3	Czech Republic	4	2	0	0	2	10	12	−2	6	Quarterfinals
4	Switzerland	4	1	0	0	3	6	15	−9	3 (Note: Switzerland 4–1 Belarus)	Relegation round
5	Belarus	4	1	0	0	3	7	15	−8	3	Relegation round

Source: IIHF
Notes:

26 December 2006; 15:00	Belarus	4–3 (1–1, 0–1, 3–1)	Finland	FM Mattsson Arena, Mora; Attendance: 1,002

Game reference
Stefanovich 06:45 (PP2); Ilin 45:20 (PP); S. Kostitsyn 48:18 (SH); Stefanovich 52:57 / Goals / Komarov 19:57 (PP); Lehtonen 30:45 (PP); Lehtonen 59:27

26 December 2006; 19:00	Czech Republic	2–3 (1–0, 0–2, 1–1)	Russia	FM Mattsson Arena, Mora; Attendance: 1,065

Game reference
Svoboda 10:05 (PP); Sobotka 55:38 (PP) / Goals / Cherepanov 22:01 (PP); Loginov 23:43; Bumagin 45:54

27 December 2006; 16:00	Switzerland	4–1 (0–1, 2–0, 2–0)	Belarus	FM Mattsson Arena, Mora; Attendance: 954

Game reference
Šimek 28:59 (SH); Lemm 29:31; Weber 40:27 (PP); Šimek 50:46 / Goals / Stas 18:31 (SH)

28 December 2006; 16:00	Finland	6–2 (0–1, 3–1, 3–0)	Czech Republic	FM Mattsson Arena, Mora; Attendance: 1,458

Game reference
Osala 20:20; Laakso 22:03; Lehtonen 23:45; Laakso 47:17 (PP); Komarov 47:47; Enlund 52:21 (SH) / Goals / Sobotka 12:39 (PP); Káňa 27:58

28 December 2006; 19:00	Russia	6–0 (0–0, 2–0, 4–0)	Switzerland	Ejendals Arena, Leksand; Attendance: 481

Game reference
Zubov 24:28 (PP); Bumagin 35:01 (PP); Makarov 41:29 (SH); Ryasensky 48:18; Anisimov 54:22 (PP); Voinov 59:34 / Goals

29 December 2006; 17:00	Belarus	1–6 (0–3, 1–2, 0–1)	Russia	FM Mattsson Arena, Mora; Attendance: 956

Game reference
Shurko 27:08 / Goals / Valentenko 04:30; Buravchikov 12:37; Vasyunov 17:13; Musatov 26:07; Ryasensky 37:27 (PP); Buravchikov 55:16

30 December 2006; 13:00	Finland	4–0 (2–0, 1–0, 1–0)	Switzerland	FM Mattsson Arena, Mora; Attendance: 1,154

Game reference
Osala 08:08 (PP); Osala 13:39 (PP); Lindgren 32:23 (PP2); Laakso 59:00 (PP2) / Goals

30 December 2006; 13:00	Czech Republic	2–1 (1–0, 0–1, 1–0)	Belarus	Ejendals Arena, Leksand; Attendance: 401

Game reference
Frolík 17:29 (SH); Svoboda 46:38 (PP2) / Goals / Filin 38:01

31 December 2006; 13:00	Russia	5–0 (2–0, 2–0, 1–0)	Finland	FM Mattsson Arena, Mora; Attendance: 1,004

Game reference
Zubov 11:28 (PP); Cherepanov 14:26 (PP); Zubov 26:42 (PP2); Churilov 30:19; Cherepanov 47:01 (PP2) / Goals

31 December 2006; 17:00	Switzerland	2–4 (1–3, 1–0, 0–1)	Czech Republic	FM Mattsson Arena, Mora; Attendance: 716

Game reference
Bürgler 19:51; Jacquemet 23:20 / Goals / Voráček 02:09 (PP); Káňa 04:52; Bartoň 17:16; Hanzal 45:03 (SH)

=== Relegation round ===
Pos	Team	Pld	W	OTW	OTL	L	GF	GA	GD	Pts	Relegation
7	Switzerland	3	3	0	0	0	11	5	+6	9	
8	Slovakia	3	1	0	0	2	12	6	+6	3 (Note: Slovakia 3 Pts, +7 GD; Germany 3 Pts, 0 GD; Belarus 3 Pts, –7 GD)	
9	Germany	3	1	0	0	2	8	10	−2	3	2008 Division I
10	Belarus	3	1	0	0	2	4	14	−10	3	2008 Division I

Source: IIHF
Notes:

2 January 2007; 16:00	Switzerland	2–1 (1–0, 0–1, 1–0)	Slovakia	FM Mattsson Arena, Mora; Attendance: 869

Game reference
Steinmann 19:41 (PP); Šimek 49:34 (PP) / Goals / Korenko 28:10 (PP2)

3 January 2007; 16:00	Germany	1–3 (1–0, 0–1, 0–2)	Belarus	FM Mattsson Arena, Mora; Attendance: 701

Game reference
Schütz 11:08 (PP) / Goals / Komarov 35:56; Stefanovich 51:58 (PP); Stefanovich 59:17

4 January 2007; 16:00	Belarus	0–9 (0–3, 0–4, 0–2)	Slovakia	FM Mattsson Arena, Mora; Attendance: 514

Game reference
Goals / Buc 04:58; Mikúš 12:06 (SH); Bartánus 14:21 (PP); Marcinko 29:03 (PP); Šinkovič 30:54; Mikúš 32:01 (PP); Záborský 39:52; Bližňák 51:25; Konrád 59:33 (PP)

4 January 2007; 19:30	Germany	3–5 (2–2, 0–2, 1–1)	Switzerland	FM Mattsson Arena, Mora; Attendance: 702

Game reference
Schütz 05:48; Schütz 17:35; Braun 44:03 / Goals / Grossmann 16:05 (PP); Friedli 18:13; Šimek 22:57 (PP); Bykov 34:13; Froidevaux 55:41

=== Final round ===
==== Bracket ====
Quarter-Finals
A2	Sweden	5
B3	Czech Republic	1
B2	Finland	3
A3	United States	6

Semi-Finals
B1	Russia	4
A2	Sweden	2
A1	Canada (GWS)	2
A3	United States	1

Gold Medal Game
B1	Russia	2
A1	Canada	4
Bronze Medal Game
A2	Sweden	1
A3	United States	2

==== Quarterfinals ====
2 January 2007; 19:30	Sweden	5–1 (2–1, 2–0, 1–0)	Czech Republic	Ejendals Arena, Leksand; Attendance: 3,313

Game reference
Isaksson 01:18; Sundström 13:09; Omark 29:02; Johansson 32:17; Johansson 53:11 / Goals / Sobotka 18:27 (PP)

2 January 2007; 19:30	Finland	3–6 (0–1, 2–1, 1–4)	United States	FM Mattsson Arena, Mora; Attendance: 1,456

Game reference
Joensuu 26:38; Osala 30:01; Osala 41:38 (PP) / Goals / E. Johnson 11:28; Kane 22:11; Skille 40:23 (PP); Mueller 47:53 (PP2); Lewis 49:00 (PP2); J. Johnson 59:40 (PP2)

==== Semifinals ====
Note: Bye teams will usually be the home team, but due to Canada being the home team in the first meeting, USA was the home team for their semifinal game.

3 January 2007; 16:00	United States	1–2 GWS (0–0, 1–0, 0–1) (OT: 0–0) (SO: 0–1)	Canada	Ejendals Arena, Leksand; Attendance: 2,376

Game reference
Jeff Frazee	Goalies	Carey Price	Referee: (Sweden) Ulf Rönnmark; Linesmen: (Czech Republic) Petr Blümel (Sweden) Fredrik Ulriksson
Chorney (Erik Johnson) (PP) – 25:04 / 1–0; / 1–1 / 52:19 – Bourdon (Russell, Toews)			Referee: (Sweden) Ulf Rönnmark; Linesmen: (Czech Republic) Petr Blümel (Sweden) Fredrik Ulriksson
	Shootout	Toews	Referee: (Sweden) Ulf Rönnmark; Linesmen: (Czech Republic) Petr Blümel (Sweden) Fredrik Ulriksson
20 min	Penalties	12 min	Referee: (Sweden) Ulf Rönnmark; Linesmen: (Czech Republic) Petr Blümel (Sweden) Fredrik Ulriksson
35	Shots	28	Referee: (Sweden) Ulf Rönnmark; Linesmen: (Czech Republic) Petr Blümel (Sweden) Fredrik Ulriksson

3 January 2007; 19:30	Russia	4–2 (2–1, 1–0, 1–1)	Sweden	Ejendals Arena, Leksand; Attendance: 5,354

Game reference

Semyon Varlamov
Goalies
Jhonas Enroth
Joel Gistedt
Referee:
(Switzerland) Danny Kurmann
Linesmen:
(Finland) Mikko Kekäläinen
(Slovakia) Milan Novák

	0–1	09:00 – Junland (Bäckström) (PP)
Makarov (Anikeyenko, Zubarev) – 16:49	1–1
Cherepanov (Bumagin, Buravchikov) (PP) – 18:18	2–1
Anisimov (Makarov) – 34:16	3–1
Vasyunov (Makarov) – 43:46	4–1
	4–2	50:54 – Hjalmarsson (Bäckström) (PP)

24 min
Penalties
10 min
25
Shots
15

==== Fifth place game ====
4 January 2007; 19:30	Czech Republic	6–2 (2–1, 3–1, 1–0)	Finland	Ejendals Arena, Leksand; Attendance: 369

Game reference
Frolík 09:56; Frolík 13:23 (PP); Hanzal 22:43 (PP); Frolík 26:25; Sobotka 38:42; Kudělka 49:34 (PP2) / Goals / Lindgren 17:22 (PP); Lehtonen 38:05 (PP)

==== Bronze medal game ====
5 January 2007; 16:00	Sweden	1–2 (0–1, 1–1, 0–0)	United States	Ejendals Arena, Leksand; Attendance: 3,635

Game reference

Joel Gistedt
Goalies
Jeff Frazee
Referee:
(Canada) Francis Charron
Linesmen:
(Czech Republic) Petr Blümel
(Finland) Mikko Kekäläinen

	0–1	19:55 – Kane (E. Johnson, Abdelkader)
Zackrisson (Bäckström, Johansson) – 29:00	1–1
	1–2	32:34 – E. Johnson (Chorney, Skille)

38 min
Penalties
14 min
26
Shots
22

==== Final ====
5 January 2007; 19:30	Russia	2–4 (0–3, 2–1, 0–0)	Canada	Ejendals Arena, Leksand; Attendance: 5,223

Game reference

Semyon Varlamov
Goalies
Carey Price
Referee:
(Switzerland) Danny Kurmann
Linesmen:
(Slovakia) Milan Novák
(Sweden) Fredrik Ulriksson

	0–1	15:35 – Cogliano (O'Marra, Pyatt)
	0–2	17:29 – Little (Letang) (PP)
	0–3	18:02 – Toews (Downie, Franson) (PP)
	0–4	26:00 – Marchand (Toews)
Valentenko (PP) – 31:27	1–4
Churilov (Loginov) (PP) – 39:24	2–4

16 min
Penalties
32 min
27
Shots
29

=== Statistics ===
==== Scoring leaders ====
Pos	Player	Country	GP	G	A	Pts	+/−	PIM
1	Erik Johnson	United States	7	4	6	10	+3	16
1	Mikko Lehtonen	Finland	6	4	6	10	+1	0
3	Perttu Lindgren	Finland	6	2	8	10	+1	8
4	Patrick Kane	United States	7	5	4	9	+2	4
5	Alexei Cherepanov	Russia	6	5	3	8	+2	2
5	Oskar Osala	Finland	6	5	3	8	+2	4
5	Felix Schütz	Germany	6	5	3	8	+2	8
8	Vladimír Sobotka	Czech Republic	6	4	4	8	+2	12
9	Alexander Bumagin	Russia	6	2	6	8	+1	16
10	Jonathan Toews	Canada	6	4	3	7	+1	12

GP = Games played; G = Goals; A = Assists; Pts = Points; +/− = Plus–minus; PIM = Penalties In Minutes

==== Goaltending leaders ====
(minimum 40% team's total ice time)

Pos	Player	Country	TOI	GA	GAA	SA	Sv%	SO
1	Carey Price	Canada	370:00	7	1.14	179	96.09	2
2	Jeff Frazee	United States	313:16	9	1.72	147	93.88	0
3	Semyon Varlamov	Russia	358:12	9	1.51	136	93.38	2
4	Joel Gistedt	Sweden	275:34	9	1.96	102	91.18	0
5	Sebastian Stefaniszin	Germany	299:00	14	2.81	153	90.85	0

TOI = Time on ice (minutes:seconds); GA = Goals against; GAA = Goals against average; SA = Shots against; Sv% = Save percentage; SO = Shutouts

=== Awards ===
- Best players selected by the Directorate:
  - Best Goaltender: (Canada) Carey Price
  - Best Defenceman: (United States) Erik Johnson
  - Best Forward: (Russia) Alexei Cherepanov
  - MVP: (Canada) Carey Price
- Media All-Stars:
  - Goaltender: (Canada) Carey Price
  - Defencemen: (United States) Erik Johnson / (Canada) Kris Letang
  - Forwards: (Russia) Alexei Cherepanov / (Canada) Jonathan Toews / (United States) Patrick Kane

=== Final standings ===
	Team
1st place, gold medalist(s)	Canada
2nd place, silver medalist(s)	Russia
3rd place, bronze medalist(s)	United States
4th	Sweden
5th	Czech Republic
6th	Finland
7th	Switzerland
8th	Slovakia
9th	Germany
10th	Belarus

== Division I ==
The Division I Championships were played on December 11–17, 2006 in Odense, Denmark (Group A) and Torre Pellice, Italy (Group B).

=== Group A ===
Pos	Team	Pld	W	OTW	OTL	L	GF	GA	GD	Pts	Promotion or relegation
1	Denmark	5	4	0	0	1	23	11	+12	12	Promoted to the 2008 Top Division
2	Latvia	5	4	0	0	1	29	13	+16	12	
3	Ukraine	5	4	0	0	1	15	9	+6	12	
4	Poland	5	2	0	0	3	14	21	−7	6	
5	Slovenia	5	1	0	0	4	12	19	−7	3	
6	Estonia	5	0	0	0	5	5	25	−20	0	Relegated to the 2008 Division II

All times local

December 11, 2006; 13:15	Estonia	0–6	Latvia

December 11, 2006; 16:45	Ukraine	2–1	Slovenia

December 11, 2006; 20:15	Poland	1–4	Denmark

December 12, 2006; 13:15	Slovenia	4–1	Estonia

December 12, 2006; 16:45	Latvia	7–2	Poland

December 12, 2006; 20:15	Denmark	4–2	Ukraine

December 14, 2006; 13:15	Estonia	3–6	Poland

December 14, 2006; 16:45	Latvia	4–5	Ukraine

December 14, 2006; 20:15	Denmark	4–2	Slovenia

December 15, 2006; 13:15	Poland	0–4	Ukraine

December 15, 2006; 16:45	Slovenia	2–7	Latvia

December 15, 2006; 20:15	Denmark	7–1	Estonia

December 17, 2006; 13:15	Slovenia	3–5	Poland

December 17, 2006; 16:45	Ukraine	2–0	Estonia

December 17, 2006; 20:15	Latvia	5–4	Denmark

=== Group B ===
Pos	Team	Pld	W	OTW	OTL	L	GF	GA	GD	Pts	Promotion or relegation
1	Kazakhstan	5	3	1	0	1	14	9	+5	11	Promoted to the 2008 Top Division
2	Austria	5	3	0	1	1	18	15	+3	10	
3	Great Britain	5	3	0	0	2	15	13	+2	9	
4	France	5	2	0	1	2	15	17	−2	7	
5	Norway	5	1	1	0	3	15	14	+1	5	
6	Italy	5	1	0	0	4	8	17	−9	3	Relegated to the 2008 Division II

All times local

December 11, 2006; 13:00	France	1–4	Kazakhstan

December 11, 2006; 16:30	Great Britain	4–3	Norway

December 11, 2006; 20:30	Austria	5–1	Italy

December 12, 2006; 13:00	Norway	4–3 (OT)	France

December 12, 2006; 16:30	Kazakhstan	3–2 (OT)	Austria

December 12, 2006; 20:30	Italy	3–1	Great Britain

December 14, 2006; 13:00	Norway	2–3	Austria

December 14, 2006; 16:30	Great Britain	4–2	France

December 14, 2006; 20:30	Kazakhstan	4–1	Italy

December 15, 2006; 13:00	France	6–3	Austria

December 15, 2006; 16:30	Kazakhstan	0–3	Great Britain

December 15, 2006; 20:30	Italy	1–4	Norway

December 17, 2006; 13:00	Austria	5–3	Great Britain

December 17, 2006; 16:30	Norway	2–3	Kazakhstan

December 17, 2006; 20:30	Italy	2–3	France

== Division II ==
The Division II Championships were played on December 11–17, 2006 in Miercurea-Ciuc, Romania (Group A) and on December 10–16, 2006 in Elektrėnai, Lithuania (Group B).

=== Group A ===
Pos	Team	Pld	W	OTW	OTL	L	GF	GA	GD	Pts	Promotion or relegation
1	Hungary	5	5	0	0	0	52	12	+40	15	Promoted to the 2008 Division I
2	Romania	5	3	1	0	1	23	13	+10	11	
3	Croatia	5	3	0	1	1	23	16	+7	10	
4	Spain	5	2	0	0	3	16	30	−14	6	
5	Iceland	5	1	0	0	4	13	35	−22	3	
6	Australia	5	0	0	0	5	11	32	−21	0	Relegated to the 2008 Division III

All times local

December 11, 2006; 13:30	Croatia	6–1	Australia

December 11, 2006; 17:00	Iceland	3–4	Spain

December 11, 2006; 20:30	Romania	2–8	Hungary

December 12, 2006; 13:30	Australia	1–3	Iceland

December 12, 2006; 17:00	Hungary	12–4	Spain

December 12, 2006; 20:30	Croatia	3–4 (OT)	Romania

December 14, 2006; 13:30	Hungary	11–5	Australia

December 14, 2006; 17:00	Croatia	8–6	Iceland

December 14, 2006; 20:30	Romania	6–1	Spain

December 15, 2006; 13:30	Iceland	1–17	Hungary

December 15, 2006; 17:00	Spain	1–6	Croatia

December 15, 2006; 20:30	Australia	1–6	Romania

December 17, 2006; 13:30	Spain	6–3	Australia

December 17, 2006; 17:00	Hungary	4–0	Croatia

December 17, 2006; 20:30	Romania	5–0	Iceland

=== Group B ===
Note: Serbia was entered in place of Serbia and Montenegro.

Pos	Team	Pld	W	OTW	OTL	L	GF	GA	GD	Pts	Promotion or relegation
1	Lithuania	5	4	1	0	0	30	7	+23	14	Promoted to the 2008 Division I
2	Netherlands	5	3	0	2	0	30	13	+17	11	
3	Japan	5	2	2	0	1	31	14	+17	10	
4	South Korea	5	1	0	1	3	13	18	−5	4	
5	Mexico	5	1	0	0	4	7	37	−30	3	
6	Serbia	5	1	0	0	4	12	34	−22	3	Relegated to the 2008 Division III

All times local

December 10, 2006; 13:00	South Korea	3–4 (OT)	Japan

December 10, 2006; 16:30	Netherlands	9–1	Mexico

December 10, 2006; 20:00	Lithuania	8–1	Serbia

December 11, 2006; 13:00	Netherlands	5–2	South Korea

December 11, 2006; 16:30	Japan	8–1	Serbia

December 11, 2006; 20:00	Mexico	0–9	Lithuania

December 13, 2006; 13:00	Japan	11–1	Mexico

December 13, 2006; 16:30	South Korea	4–5	Serbia

December 13, 2006; 20:00	Netherlands	3–4 (OT)	Lithuania

December 14, 2006; 13:00	Mexico	0–4	South Korea

December 14, 2006; 16:30	Serbia	1–8	Netherlands

December 14, 2006; 20:00	Lithuania	5–3	Japan

December 16, 2006; 13:00	Serbia	4–5	Mexico

December 16, 2006; 16:30	South Korea	0–4	Lithuania

December 16, 2006; 20:00	Japan	5–4 (OT)	Netherlands

== Division III ==
The Division III Championship was played on January 8–14, 2007 at the Ankara Ice Palace in Ankara, Turkey.

Pos	Team	Pld	W	OTW	OTL	L	GF	GA	GD	Pts	Promotion
1	China	5	4	1	0	0	37	12	+25	14	Promoted to the 2008 Division II
2	Belgium	5	4	0	1	0	38	12	+26	13	Promoted to the 2008 Division II
3	New Zealand	5	2	1	0	2	22	18	+4	8	
4	Armenia	5	2	0	1	2	26	27	−1	7	
5	Turkey	5	1	0	0	4	9	31	−22	3	
6	Bulgaria	5	0	0	0	5	13	45	−32	0	

All times local

January 8, 2007; 13:00	New Zealand	6–5 (OT)	Armenia

January 8, 2007; 16:30	Belgium	9–1	Bulgaria

January 8, 2007; 20:00	Turkey	0–6	China

January 9, 2007; 13:00	China	15–3	Bulgaria

January 9, 2007; 16:30	Armenia	4–7	Belgium

January 9, 2007; 20:00	New Zealand	2–6	Turkey

January 11, 2007; 13:00	China	7–4	Armenia

January 11, 2007; 16:30	New Zealand	1–5	Belgium

January 11, 2007; 20:00	Turkey	4–2	Bulgaria

January 12, 2007; 13:00	Belgium	4–5 (OT)	China

January 12, 2007; 16:30	Bulgaria	2–8	New Zealand

January 12, 2007; 20:00	Armenia	4–2	Turkey

January 14, 2007; 13:00	Bulgaria	5–9	Armenia

January 14, 2007; 16:30	Turkey	1–13	Belgium

January 14, 2007; 20:00	China	4–1	New Zealand

== See also ==
- 2007 in ice hockey
- 2007 World Junior Ice Hockey Championships rosters

Preceded by 2006 World Juniors	World Junior Ice Hockey Championships See also: 2007 World Championships	Succeeded by 2008 World Juniors
