= 2014 Karjala Tournament =

2014 Karjala Tournament (Euro Hockey Games)
Tournament details
- Host countries: Finland; Sweden
- Cities: Helsinki; Leksand
- Venues: 2 (in 2 host cities)
- Dates: 6–9 November 2014
- Teams: 4

Final positions
- Champions: Sweden (3rd title)
- Runners-up: Finland
- Third place: Russia
- Fourth place: Czech Republic

Tournament statistics
- Games played: 6
- Goals scored: 36 (6 per game)
- Attendance: 43,727 (7,288 per game)
- Scoring leader: (Russia) Alexander Radulov (4 points)

The 2014 Karjala Tournament was played between 6 and 9 November 2014. The Czech Republic, Finland, Sweden and Russia played a round-robin for a total of three games per team and six games in total. Five of the matches were played in the Hartwall Areena in Helsinki, Finland, and one match in the Tegera Arena in Leksand, Sweden. The tournament was won by Sweden before Finland, making it the first time Sweden won the tournament since 1997. The tournament was part of 2014–15 Euro Hockey Tour.

== Standings ==
Pos	Team	Pld	W	OTW	OTL	L	GF	GA	GD	Pts
1	Sweden	3	1	2	0	0	12	7	+5	7
2	Finland	3	2	0	0	1	8	6	+2	6
3	Russia	3	1	0	1	1	10	13	−3	4
4	Czech Republic	3	0	0	1	2	6	10	−4	1

Source: Swehockey

== Games ==
All times are local. Helsinki – (Eastern European Time – UTC+2) Leksand – (Central European Time – UTC+1)

6 November 2014; 13:00	Finland	2–1 (1–0, 1–1, 0–0)	Czech Republic	Hartwall Arena, Helsinki; Attendance: 7 026

Game reference

Juha Metsola
Goalies
Pavel Francouz
Referees:
(Sweden) Tobias Björk
(Sweden) Linus Öhlund

J. Immonen (H. Pesonen, V. Koistinen) - 16:15	1–0
	1–1	24:24 - R. Smoleňák (T. Kubalík)
O. Palola (I. Filppula, M. Kousa) - 31:27	2–1

23
Shots
29

6 November 2014; 19:00	Sweden	5–4 GWS (2–0, 1–3, 1–1) (OT: 0–0) (SO: 1–0)	Russia	Tegera Arena, Leksand; Attendance: 6,634

Game reference

Anders Nilsson
Goalies
Stanislav Galimov
Referees:
(Czech Republic) Jan Hribík
(Czech Republic) Pavel Hodek
Linesmen:
(Sweden) Örjan Åhlén
(Sweden) Andreas Malmqvist

P. Hersley (N. Danielsson, L. Klasen) - 01:35	1–0
A. Engvist (T. Brithen) - 12:27	2–0
	2–1	30:50 - D. Kugryshev (A. Slepyshev)
	2–2	31:41 - D. Kokarev (I. Zubov, A. Radulov)
	2–3	34:03 - A. Radulov (I. Zubov, Y. Medvedev)
D. Ullström (A. Urbom, L. Klasen) - 36:09	3–3
T. Wandell (J. Fransson) (PP1) - 45:04	4–3
	4-4	45:57 Anton Slepyshev (Dmitrij Kugryshev)

André Petersson
Linus Klasen
Shootout
(miss) Alexander Radulov
(miss) Dmitrij Kugryshev
16 min
Penalties
10 min
34
Shots
29

8 November 2014; 11:00	Czech Republic	3–4 GWS (0–0, 3–3, 0–0) (OT: 0–0) (SO: 0–1)	Sweden	Hartwall Arena, Helsinki; Attendance: 2 994

Game reference

Šimon Hrubec
Goalies
Anders Nilsson
Referees:
(Finland) Mikko Kaukokari
(Finland) Aleksi Johannes Rantala
Linesmen:
(Finland) Jani Pesonen
(Finland) Hannu Sormunen

	0–1	21:17 - J. Ericsson (P. Hersley)
	0–2	21:39 - J. Ericsson (M. Paulsson)
T. Filippi (T. Kubalík) - 22:01	1–2
P. Zámořský (V. Svačina) - 34:52	2–2
R. Smoleňák (L. Radil, M. Birner - 39:23	3–2
	3–3	39:46 - A. Petersson (L. Klasen, J. Fransson)

Radek Smoleňák (miss)
Vladimír Svačina (miss)
Shootout
(miss) Andreas Engvist
Linus Klasen
A. Petersson
8 min
Penalties
8 min
28
Shots
23

8 November 2014; 15:00	Russia	2–6 (1–1, 1–4, 0–1)	Finland	Hartwall Arena, Helsinki; Attendance: 11 781

Game reference

Vasilij Kosheckin
Goalies
Atte Engren
Referees:
(Sweden) Tobias Björk
(Sweden) Linus Öhlund
Linesmen:
(Finland) Markus Hägerström
(Finland) Iikka Kiilunen

A. Panarin (Y. Averin, I. Kovalchuk) - 10:45	1–0
	1–1	19:36 - J. Immonen (J. Hietanen, V. Koistinen)
D. Kokarev (Y. Medvedev, A. Radulov) - 20:30	2–1
	2–2	23:05 - J. Pesonen (J. Imonen)
	2–3	28:55 - E. Lindell (Lennart Petrell)
	2–4	30:03 - K. Näkyvä
	2–5	31:10 - O. Osala (T. Kivistö, I. Filppula)
	2–6	51:54 - T. Hartikanen (J-P. Hytönen, A. Ohtamaa)

6 min
Penalties
8 min
32
Shots
23

9 November 2014; 11:00	Russia	4–2 (3–0, 0–0, 1–2)	Czech Republic	Hartwall Arena, Helsinki; Attendance: 3 729

Game reference

Ilya Sorokin
Goalies
Pavel Francouz
Referees:
(Finland) Antti Boman
(Finland) Anssi Kalevi Salonen
Linesmen:
(Finland) Masi Puolakka
(Finland) Sakari Suominen

A. Panarin (I. Kovalchuk) - 00:54	1–0
Y. Averin (A. Mironov, I. Kovalchuk) - 09:41	2–0
A. Panarin (I. Kovalchuk) - 17:12	3–0
	3–1	43:11 - (PP1) O. Roman (V. Svačina)
A. Radulov (Y. Medvedev, Y. Averin) - 54:57	4–1
	4–2	57:50 - P. Holík (M. Birner, Petr Pohl)

22 min
Penalties
26 min
25
Shots
28

9 November 2014; 11:00	Finland	0–3 (0–1, 0–2, 0–0)	Sweden	Hartwall Arena, Helsinki; Attendance: 3 729

Game reference

Atte Engren
Goalies
Henrik Karlsson
Referees:
(Russia) Konstantin Olenin
(Russia) Alexej Ravodin
Linesmen:
(Finland) Henri Neva
(Finland) Pasi Nieminen

0–1	17:58 - L. Klasen (J. Fransson)
0–2	23:08 - D. Axelsson (J. Ericsson, A. Thuresson)
0–3	28:09 - P. Hersley (C. Ridderwall)

8 min
Penalties
12 min
39
Shots
21

== Scoring leaders ==
Pos	Player	Country	GP	G	A	Pts	+/−	PIM	POS
1	Alexander Radulov	Russia	3	2	2	4	+1	4	F
2	Egor Averin	Sweden	3	1	3	4	+3	0	F
3	Linus Klasen	Sweden	3	1	3	4	+1	2	F
4	Ilya Kovalchuk	Russia	3	0	4	4	+1	2	F
5	Artemi Panarin	Russia	3	3	0	3	+2	0	F

GP = Games played; G = Goals; A = Assists; Pts = Points; +/− = Plus/minus; PIM = Penalties in minutes; POS = Position
Source: quanthockey

== Goaltending leaders ==
Pos	Player	Country	TOI	GA	GAA	Sv%	SO
1	Juha Metsola	Finland	60:00	1	1.00	96.55	0
2	Atte Engren	Finland	116:38	5	2.57	90.20	0
3	Stanislav Galimov	Russia	65:00	4	3.69	87.88	0
4	Anders Nilsson	Sweden	130:00	7	3.23	87.72	0
5	Pavel Francouz	Czech Republic	118:49	6	3.03	87.50	0
6	Šimon Hrubec	Czech Republic	65:00	3	2.77	86.36	0

TOI = Time on ice (minutes:seconds); SA = Shots against; GA = Goals against; GAA = Goals Against Average; Sv% = Save percentage; SO = Shutouts
Source: swehockey

== Tournament awards ==
The tournament directorate named the following players in the tournament 2014:

- Best goalkeeper: (Sweden) Henrik Karlsson
- Best defenceman: (Finland) Atte Ohtamaa
- Best forward: (Sweden) Linus Klasen
