= Bumagin =

Bumagin (Russian: Бумагин, from бумага meaning paper) is a Russian masculine surname, its feminine counterpart is Bumagina. It may refer to

- Alexander Bumagin (born 1987), Russian ice hockey player
- Evgeni Bumagin (born 1982), Russian-Kazakhstani ice hockey winger
