= Alexander Loginov =

Alexander Loginov may refer to:

- Alexander Loginov (biathlon), a Russian biathlete
- Alexander Loginov (ice hockey), a Russian ice hockey player
