= Isaksson =

Isaksson is a surname of Swedish origin.

== Geographical distribution ==
As of 2014, 89.4% of all known bearers of the surname Isaksson were residents of Sweden (frequency 1:774), 6.0% of Finland (1:6,482) and 1.3% of the United States (1:1,911,382).

In Sweden, the frequency of the surname was higher than national average ( 1:774) in the following counties:

1. Norrbotten County (1:122)
2. Västerbotten County (1:393)
3. Jönköping County (1:409)
4. Kronoberg County (1:565)
5. Halland County (1:614)
6. Kalmar County (1:658)
7. Västernorrland County (1:703)
8. Jämtland County (1:763)

In Finland, the frequency of the surname was higher than national average (1:6,482) in the following regions:

1. Åland (1:448)
2. Southwest Finland (1:1,696)
3. Ostrobothnia (1:2,414)
4. Central Ostrobothnia (1:5,144)
5. Uusimaa (1:5,145)

== People ==
- Selim Isakson (1892–1960), Major-General and General Officer Commanding Kymi Military District during World War II.
- Anders Isaksson (1943–2009), Swedish journalist, writer, and historian
- Andreas Isaksson (born 1981), Swedish football player
- Elisabeth Isaksson Swedish glaciologist
- Fredrik Isaksson (born 1971), Swedish heavy-metal guitarist
- Kjell Isaksson (born 1948), Swedish pole vaulter
- Magnus Isaksson (born 1987), Swedish ice hockey player
- Patrik Isaksson (swimmer) (born 1973), Swedish Olympic swimmer
- Patrik Isaksson (singer) (born 1972), Swedish rock singer and songwriter
- Ulla Isaksson (1916–2000), Swedish novelist and screenplay writer
