= Pavel Valentenko =

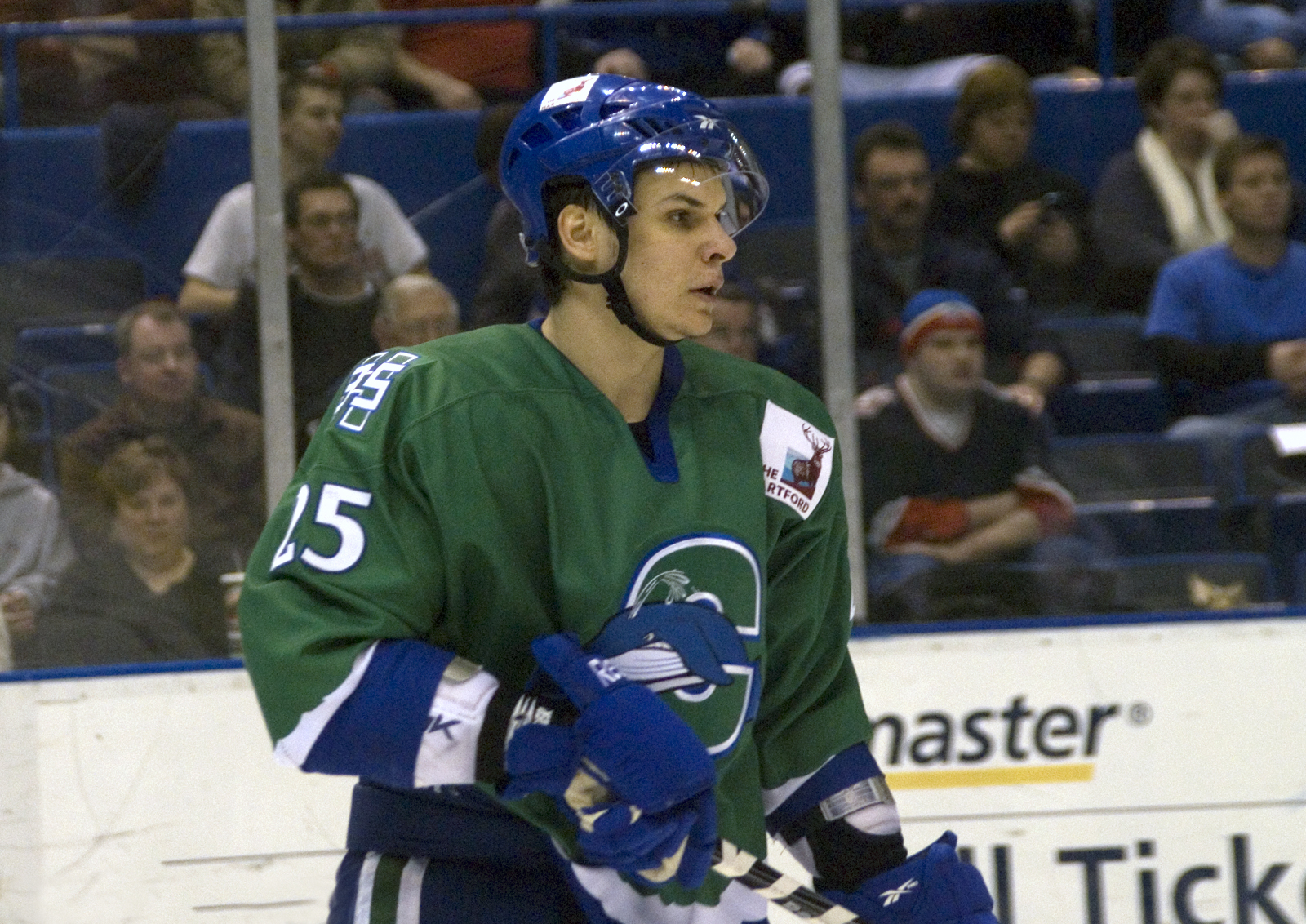
- Pavel Valentenko while playing with the Connecticut Whale
- Born: 20 October 1987 (age 38) Nizhnekamsk, Soviet Union
- Height: 6 ft 2 in (188 cm)
- Weight: 223 lb (101 kg; 15 st 13 lb)
- Position: Defence
- Shot: Left
- Played for: Neftekhimik Nizhnekamsk; Hamilton Bulldogs; Dynamo Moscow; Hartford Wolf Pack; Connecticut Whale; Avangard Omsk; Torpedo Nizhny Novgorod; Spartak Moscow; HC Yugra
- NHL draft: 139th overall, 2006; Montreal Canadiens
- Playing career: 2006–2020

Pavel Aleksandrovich Valentenko (Russian: Павел Валентенко; born 20 October 1987) is a Russian former professional ice hockey defenceman. He was selected in the fifth round, 139th overall, by the Montreal Canadiens in the 2006 NHL entry draft.

== Playing career ==
Valentenko was drafted in the fifth round, 139th overall, in the 2006 NHL entry draft by the Montreal Canadiens. He moved to North America in 2007 after growing up in the Nizhnekamsk hockey system to play for the Hamilton Bulldogs, the Canadiens' farm team. He was voted best rookie for the Bulldogs in his first season (2007–08) and was part of the group of players Montreal recalled for the 2008 NHL Playoffs in the case of injuries.

On 30 October 2008, it was reported that Valentenko had defected from the Hamilton Bulldogs and signed a three-year contract with Dynamo Moscow. This news came just days after Valentenko was given permission by the Bulldogs to go home to Russia for an indefinite period of time to deal with family issues.

On 30 June 2009, Valentenko was traded along with Chris Higgins, Doug Janik and Ryan McDonagh to the New York Rangers for Scott Gomez, Tom Pyatt and Michael Busto.

Between 2009 and 2012 he played for the Connecticut Whale of the American Hockey League. During the offseason in 2012 he signed with Avangard Omsk.

== Career statistics ==
=== Regular season and playoffs ===
			Regular season					Playoffs
Season	Team	League	GP	G	A	Pts	PIM	GP	G	A	Pts	PIM
2002–03	Lada–2 Togliatti	RUS.3	8	0	0	0	4	—	—	—	—	—
2003–04	Neftekhimik–2 Nizhnekamsk	RUS.3	26	0	1	1	28	—	—	—	—	—
2004–05	Neftekhimik–2 Nizhnekamsk	RUS.3	62	7	7	14	140	—	—	—	—	—
2005–06	Neftekhimik Nizhnekamsk	RSL	2	0	0	0	2	—	—	—	—	—
2005–06	Neftekhimik–2 Nizhnekamsk	RUS.3	58	11	20	31	195	—	—	—	—	—
2006–07	Neftekhimik Nizhnekamsk	RSL	50	0	2	2	62	4	0	0	0	2
2006–07	Neftekhimik–2 Nizhnekamsk	RUS.3	6	2	2	4	10	—	—	—	—	—
2007–08	Hamilton Bulldogs	AHL	57	1	15	16	58	—	—	—	—	—
2008–09	Hamilton Bulldogs	AHL	4	0	2	2	2	—	—	—	—	—
2008–09	Dynamo Moscow	KHL	8	0	1	1	8	1	0	0	0	2
2008–09	Dynamo–2 Moscow	RUS.3	12	3	6	9	26	2	0	0	0	4
2009–10	Dynamo Moscow	KHL	7	0	0	0	2	—	—	—	—	—
2010–11	Hartford Wolf Pack/CT Whale	AHL	79	5	12	17	38	6	0	0	0	12
2011–12	Connecticut Whale	AHL	60	5	16	21	53	9	0	3	3	6
2012–13	Avangard Omsk	KHL	39	1	2	3	48	11	2	0	2	0
2013–14	Torpedo Nizhny Novgorod	KHL	53	7	11	18	28	7	0	3	3	4
2014–15	Torpedo Nizhny Novgorod	KHL	26	0	4	4	55	—	—	—	—	—
2014–15	HC Yugra	KHL	22	1	6	7	14	—	—	—	—	—
2015–16	Avangard Omsk	KHL	24	1	2	3	43	—	—	—	—	—
2015–16	Spartak Moscow	KHL	16	1	3	4	10	—	—	—	—	—
2016–17	HC Yugra	KHL	44	1	4	5	48	—	—	—	—	—
2017–18	HC Yugra	KHL	10	0	3	3	9	—	—	—	—	—
2018–19	Yuzhny Ural Orsk	VHL	35	4	9	13	12	—	—	—	—	—
2018–19	HC Yugra	VHL	12	1	4	5	14	3	1	1	2	0
2019–20	HC Yugra	VHL	33	5	6	11	68	8	1	1	2	2
KHL totals			249	12	36	48	265	19	2	3	5	6
AHL totals			190	11	45	56	151	15	0	3	3	18

Medal record

Representing Russia

Ice hockey

World Junior Championships
Silver medal – second place	2007 Sweden	

=== International ===
Year	Team	Event	Result	GP	G	A	Pts	PIM
2007	Russia	WJC	2nd place, silver medalist(s)	6	2	1	3	6
Junior totals				6	2	1	3	6
