= Vyacheslav Buravchikov =

Russian ice hockey player (born 1987)

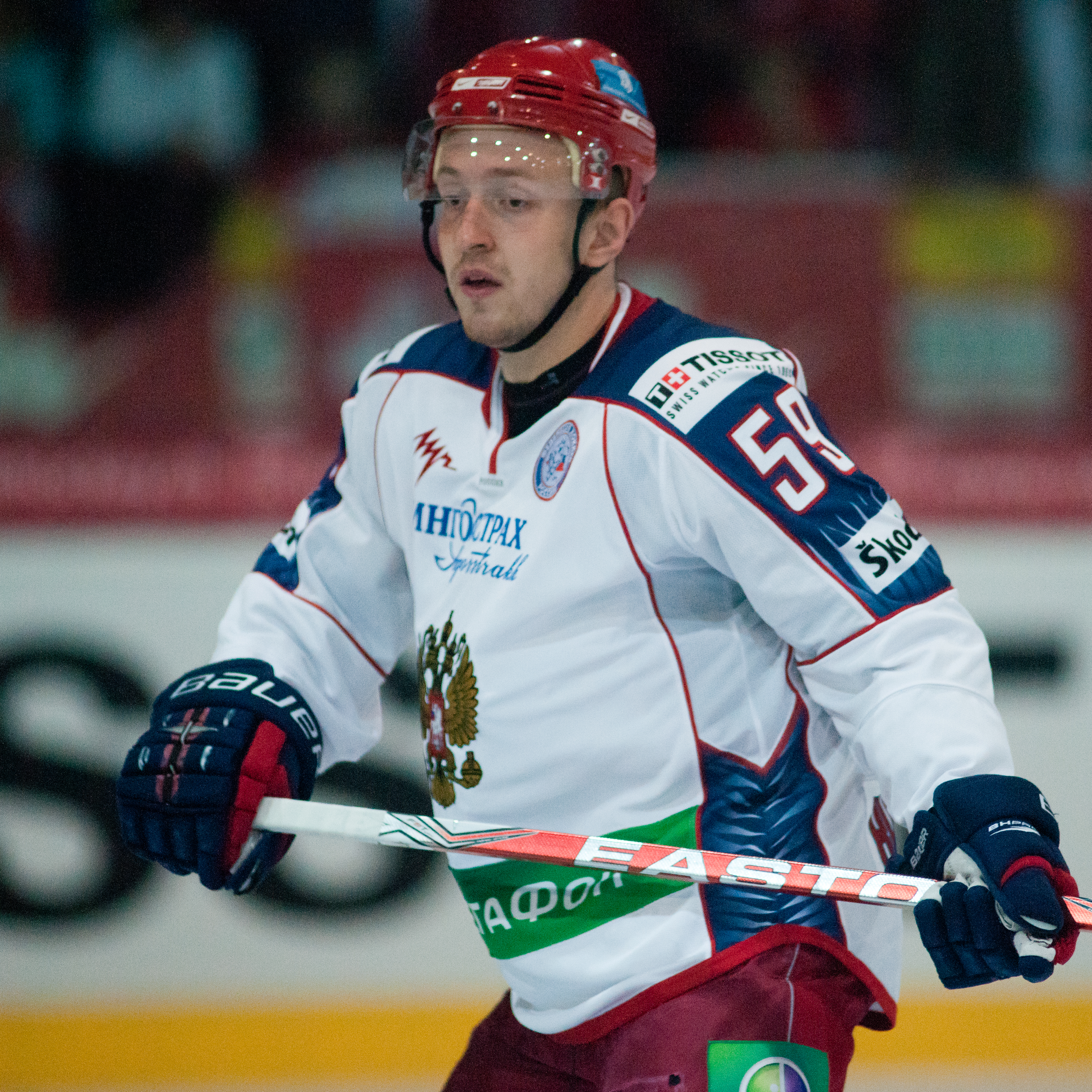
- Born: May 22, 1987 (age 38) Moscow, RSFSR, USSR
- Height: 6 ft 1 in (185 cm)
- Weight: 189 lb (86 kg; 13 st 7 lb)
- Position: Defence
- Shot: Left
- Played for: HC Atlant Moscow; Ak Bars Kazan; HC CSKA Moscow
- National team: Russia
- NHL draft: 191st overall, 2005; Buffalo Sabres
- Playing career: 2004–2013

Vyacheslav Buravchikov (born May 22, 1987) is a Russian former professional ice hockey defenceman. He played for HC Atlant Moscow, Ak Bars Kazan and HC CSKA Moscow. He was drafted 191st overall in the 2005 NHL entry draft by the Buffalo Sabres of the National Hockey League (NHL).

On December 24, 2010, he was traded to HC CSKA Moscow for defenceman Konstantin Korneyev and a financial compensation. In 2013, Buravchikov took time out from hockey because of a heart problem.

== Career statistics ==
=== Regular season and playoffs ===
			Regular season					Playoffs
Season	Team	League	GP	G	A	Pts	PIM	GP	G	A	Pts	PIM
2002–03	Krylia Sovetov–2 Moscow	RUS.3	2	0	2	2	0	—	—	—	—	—
2003–04	Krylia Sovetov–2 Moscow	RUS.3	20	3	7	10	38	—	—	—	—	—
2004–05	Krylya Sovetov Moscow	RUS.2	26	4	1	5	14	3	0	0	0	2
2004–05	Krylia Sovetov–2 Moscow	RUS.3	15	5	6	11	24	—	—	—	—	—
2005–06	Khimik Moscow Oblast	RSL	43	1	3	4	24	9	1	0	1	4
2006–07	Ak Bars Kazan	RSL	35	0	3	3	20	—	—	—	—	—
2006–07	Ak Bars–2 Kazan	RUS.3	6	2	4	6	0	—	—	—	—	—
2007–08	Ak Bars Kazan	RSL	46	1	0	1	12	10	1	0	1	4
2007–08	Ak Bars–2 Kazan	RUS.3	8	6	3	9	4	—	—	—	—	—
2008–09	Ak Bars Kazan	KHL	44	4	6	10	14	18	0	1	1	16
2009–10	Ak Bars Kazan	KHL	35	3	3	6	26	6	0	1	1	0
2010–11	Ak Bars Kazan	KHL	21	2	0	2	8	—	—	—	—	—
2010–11	CSKA Moscow	KHL	17	0	3	3	2	—	—	—	—	—
2011–12	CSKA Moscow	KHL	54	5	2	7	16	5	0	0	0	4
2012–13	CSKA Moscow	KHL	16	0	1	1	0	—	—	—	—	—
RSL totals			124	2	6	8	56	19	2	0	2	8
KHL totals			187	14	15	29	66	29	0	2	2	20

=== International ===
Year	Team	Event	Result	GP	G	A	Pts	PIM
2004	Russia	U17	5th	5	0	4	4	2
2004	Russia	U18	5th	5	0	1	1	6
2005	Russia	WJC18	5th	6	3	4	7	4
2006	Russia	WJC	2nd place, silver medalist(s)	6	0	2	2	4
2007	Russia	WJC	2nd place, silver medalist(s)	6	2	2	4	2
Junior totals				28	5	13	18	18
