= Michael Busto =

Canadian ice hockey player

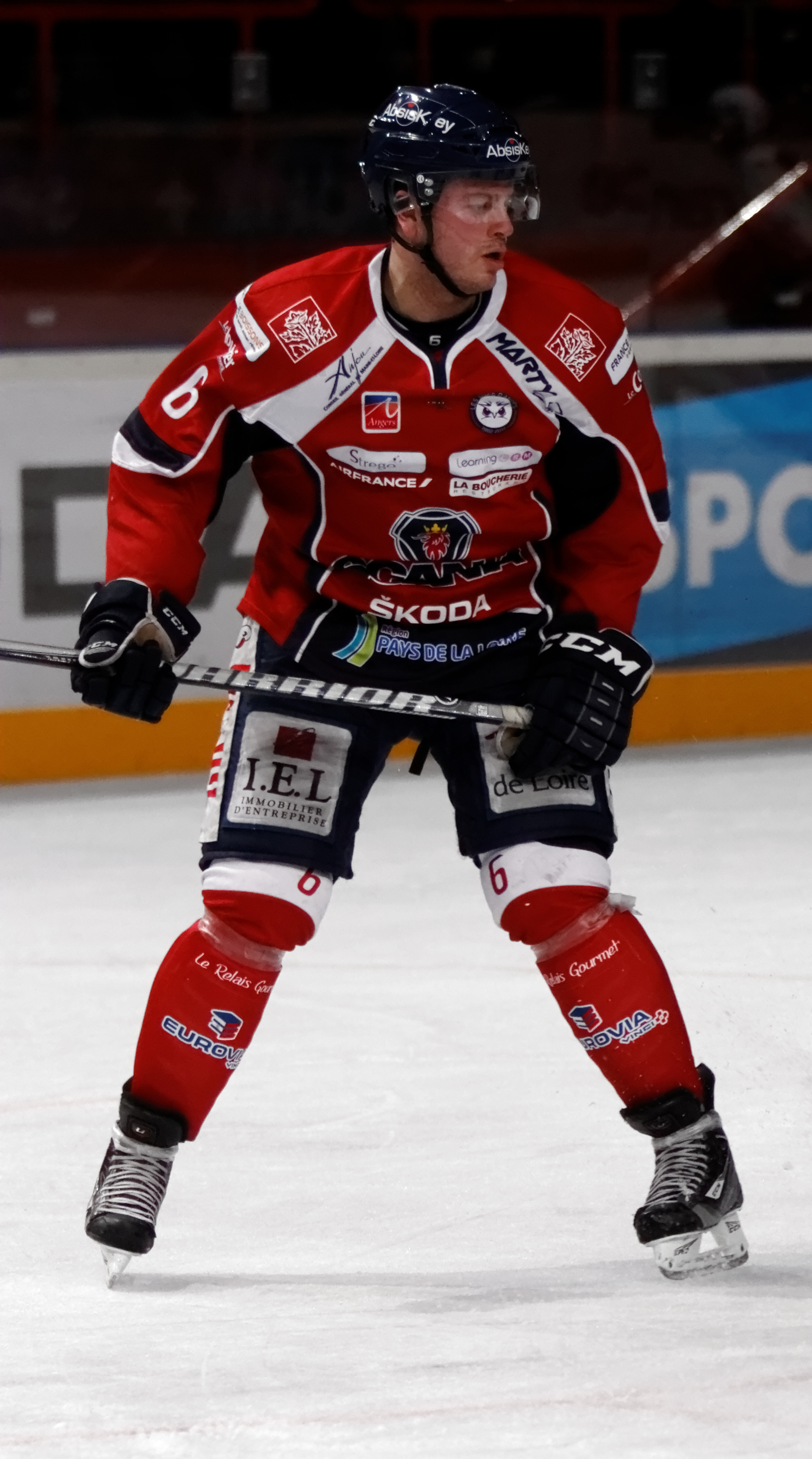
- Born: June 20, 1986 (age 39) Burnaby, British Columbia, Canada
- Height: 6 ft 2 in (188 cm)
- Weight: 210 lb (95 kg; 15 st 0 lb)
- Position: Defence
- Shot: Right
- Played for: Ducs d'Angers; HC Bolzano; Las Vegas Wranglers; Elmira Jackals; Charlotte Checkers
- NHL draft: Undrafted
- Playing career: 2007–2015

Michael Busto (born June 20, 1986) is a Canadian former professional ice hockey defenceman. He most recently played for Ducs d'Angers of the French Ligue Magnus.

== Playing career ==
Busto was born, in Burnaby, British Columbia. Busto played in the Western Hockey League with the Swift Current Broncos, Kootenay Ice, and Moose Jaw Warriors.

On April 27, 2007, Busto signed with the New York Rangers to a three-year, entry-level contract. Busto was then assigned to Rangers affiliate, the Charlotte Checkers of the ECHL.

Busto spent two seasons with the Checkers before on June 30, 2009, he was traded by the Rangers, along with Scott Gomez and Tom Pyatt, to the Montreal Canadiens for Chris Higgins, Ryan McDonagh, Doug Janik and Pavel Valentenko.

After completion of his entry-level contract, Busto was released as a free agent by the Canadiens to briefly play in 9 games with the Elmira Jackals during the 2009–10 season. He belatedly signed a one-year deal in Europe with Italian club, HC Bolzano of the Serie A on December 27, 2010. Busto played in 12 games for Bolzano before returning to the familiar ECHL for the following 2011–12 season with the Las Vegas Wranglers. Busto enjoyed his most successful season in the ECHL playing in a career high 65 games and contributing to the Wranglers playoff run as Kelly Cup finalists.

On June 25, 2012, Busto returned to Europe to sign an initial one-year contract with French club Ducs d'Angers of the Ligue Magnus. In the 2012–13 season with the Owls, Busto led the team from the blueline in scoring with 14 points in 26 games. He was signed to a two-year contract extension on May 7, 2013.

== Career statistics ==
			Regular season					Playoffs
Season	Team	League	GP	G	A	Pts	PIM	GP	G	A	Pts	PIM
2001–02	Moose Jaw Warriors	WHL	3	0	0	0	2	—	—	—	—	—
2002–03	Moose Jaw Warriors	WHL	50	1	7	8	54	7	1	0	1	0
2003–04	Moose Jaw Warriors	WHL	42	4	13	17	51	—	—	—	—	—
2003–04	Swift Current Broncos	WHL	26	0	0	0	29	5	0	0	0	2
2004–05	Kootenay Ice	WHL	71	8	21	29	79	16	1	5	6	27
2005–06	Kootenay Ice	WHL	69	8	35	43	77	4	0	4	4	4
2006–07	Kootenay Ice	WHL	70	20	43	63	79	6	1	2	3	9
2007–08	Charlotte Checkers	ECHL	48	4	12	16	10	—	—	—	—	—
2008–09	Charlotte Checkers	ECHL	54	3	8	11	41	—	—	—	—	—
2009–10	Dayton Gems	IHL	2	0	0	0	0	—	—	—	—	—
2009–10	Elmira Jackals	ECHL	9	1	3	4	0	—	—	—	—	—
2010–11	HC Bolzano	ITL	12	1	2	3	8	—	—	—	—	—
2011–12	Las Vegas Wranglers	ECHL	65	1	12	13	33	15	1	2	3	9
2012–13	Ducs d'Angers	FRA	26	3	11	14	24	16	2	1	3	2
ECHL totals			176	9	35	44	84	15	1	2	3	9
