= Konstantin Korneyev =

Russian ice hockey player

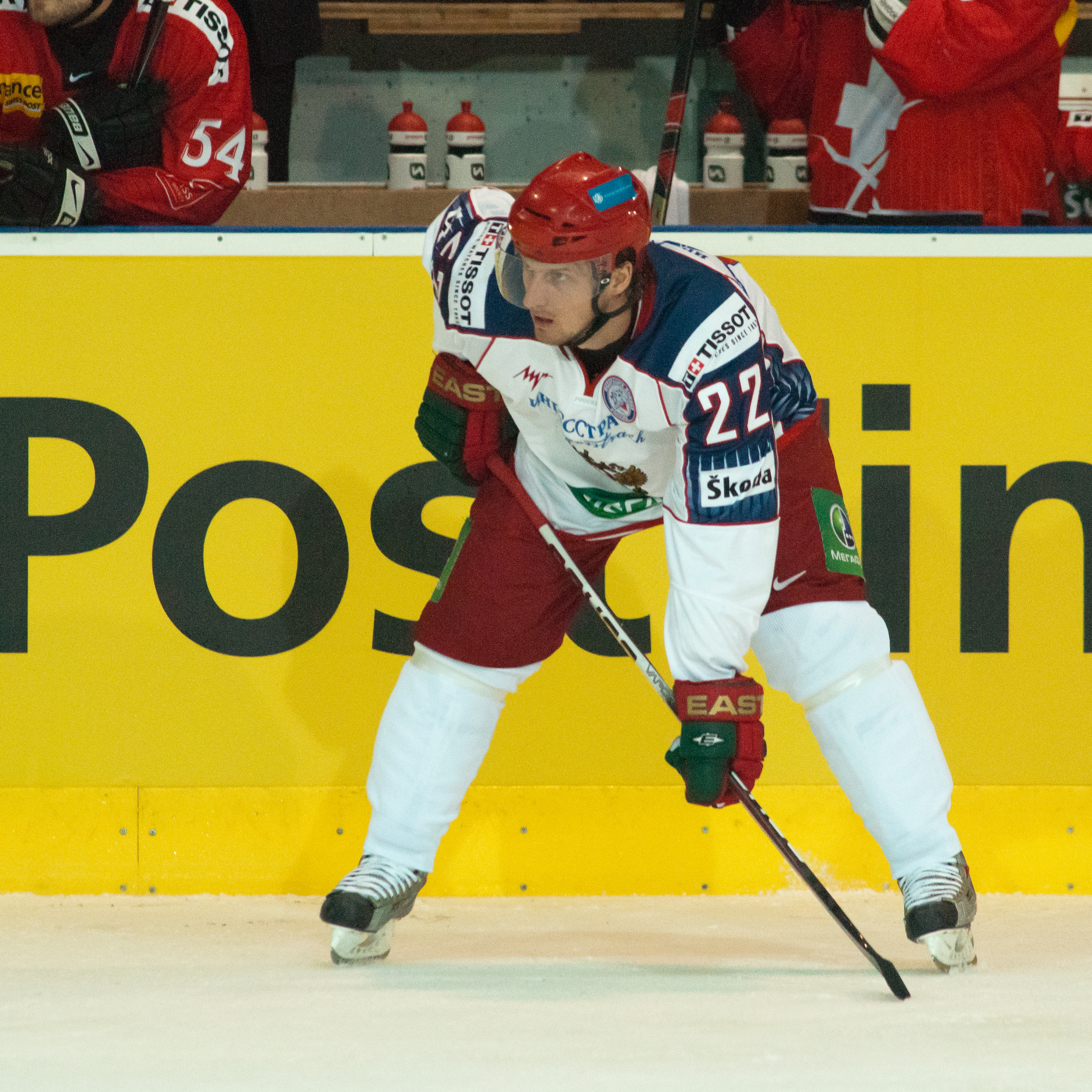
- Born: June 5, 1984 (age 41) Moscow, Russian SFSR, Soviet Union
- Height: 5 ft 11 in (180 cm)
- Weight: 181 lb (82 kg; 12 st 13 lb)
- Position: Defence
- Shot: Left
- Played for: Krylya Sovetov; Ak Bars Kazan; CSKA Moscow; Salavat Yulaev Ufa; Severstal Cherepovets
- National team: Russia
- NHL draft: 275th overall, 2002; Montreal Canadiens
- Playing career: 2001–2019

Konstantin Nikolayevich Korneyev (Russian: Константи́н Никола́евич Корне́ев; born June 5, 1984) is a Russian former professional ice hockey defenceman. He was selected in the ninth round, 275th overall, by the Montreal Canadiens in the 2002 NHL entry draft.

== Playing career ==
Drafted by the Montreal Canadiens of the National Hockey League (NHL) in 2002(9th round, 275th overall), Korneyev has played with Krylya Sovetov Moscow, Ak Bars Kazan and CSKA Moscow in Russia, but has not played in the NHL. He wins Russian Superleague 2006 with Ak Bars. During the summer of 2011 he was removed as a prospect from the Montreal Canadiens website indicating a possible rupture in their association, however this has not yet been verified.

On December 24, 2010, he was traded from HC CSKA Moscow to Ak Bars Kazan for defenseman Vyacheslav Buravchikov and a financial compensation.

He played for the Russian national team at the 2008 IIHF World Championship, 2009 IIHF World Championship, 2010 IIHF World Championship where he won two gold medals and a silver medal with the team.

== Career statistics ==
=== Regular season and playoffs ===
			Regular season					Playoffs
Season	Team	League	GP	G	A	Pts	PIM	GP	G	A	Pts	PIM
1999–2000	Krylya Sovetov–2 Moscow	RUS.3	1	0	0	0	2	—	—	—	—	—
2000–01	Krylya Sovetov–2 Moscow	RUS.3	24	4	9	13	10	—	—	—	—	—
2001–02	Krylya Sovetov Moscow	RSL	4	0	2	2	0	2	0	0	0	2
2001–02	Krylya Sovetov–2 Moscow	RUS.3	26	9	19	28	44	—	—	—	—	—
2002–03	Krylya Sovetov Moscow	RSL	49	2	8	10	28	2	0	0	0	2
2002–03	Krylya Sovetov–2 Moscow	RUS.3	4	0	6	6	2	—	—	—	—	—
2003–04	Ak Bars Kazan	RSL	55	1	4	5	8	8	0	1	1	2
2004–05	Ak Bars Kazan	RSL	35	0	4	4	10	1	0	0	0	0
2004–05	Ak Bars–2 Kazan	RUS.3	9	6	16	22	0	—	—	—	—	—
2005–06	Ak Bars Kazan	RSL	30	1	3	4	14	4	0	0	0	0
2005–06	Ak Bars–2 Kazan	RUS.3	4	3	6	9	2	—	—	—	—	—
2006–07	CSKA Moscow	RSL	54	8	14	22	40	12	2	4	6	6
2007–08	CSKA Moscow	RSL	57	6	18	24	52	6	0	1	1	0
2008–09	CSKA Moscow	KHL	54	6	18	24	46	8	1	0	1	6
2009–10	CSKA Moscow	KHL	55	7	22	29	28	3	0	2	2	0
2010–11	CSKA Moscow	KHL	35	7	14	21	34	—	—	—	—	—
2010–11	Ak Bars Kazan	KHL	17	1	5	6	4	9	0	4	4	4
2011–12	Ak Bars Kazan	KHL	53	5	22	27	20	12	1	3	4	2
2012–13	Ak Bars Kazan	KHL	51	6	9	15	26	18	1	2	3	8
2013–14	Ak Bars Kazan	KHL	54	1	9	10	28	6	0	0	0	4
2014–15	Ak Bars Kazan	KHL	57	2	13	15	30	20	0	0	0	2
2015–16	Ak Bars Kazan	KHL	49	0	6	6	22	2	0	0	0	0
2016–17	Salavat Yulaev Ufa	KHL	41	1	2	3	12	1	0	0	0	0
2017–18	Severstal Cherepovets	KHL	30	0	2	2	14	2	0	0	0	0
2018–19	Severstal Cherepovets	KHL	44	1	7	8	30	—	—	—	—	—
RSL totals			284	18	53	71	152	35	2	6	8	12
KHL totals			540	37	129	166	294	81	3	11	14	26

=== International ===
Year	Team	Event	Result	GP	G	A	Pts	PIM
2001	Russia	U17	7th	5	0	1	1	6
2002	Russia	WJC18	2nd place, silver medalist(s)	8	2	5	7	0
2003	Russia	WJC	1st place, gold medalist(s)	6	0	2	2	4
2004	Russia	WJC	5th	6	0	5	5	6
2007	Russia	WC	3rd place, bronze medalist(s)	1	0	0	0	0
2008	Russia	WC	1st place, gold medalist(s)	9	1	5	6	0
2009	Russia	WC	1st place, gold medalist(s)	6	0	1	1	2
2010	Russia	OG	6th	4	0	0	0	4
2010	Russia	WC	2nd place, silver medalist(s)	9	0	0	0	2
2011	Russia	WC	4th	9	0	3	3	0
Junior totals				25	2	13	15	16
Senior totals				38	1	9	10	8
