= Wibe Arena =

Indoor ice rink in Mora, Sweden

Coordinates: 61°00′25″N 14°31′51″E

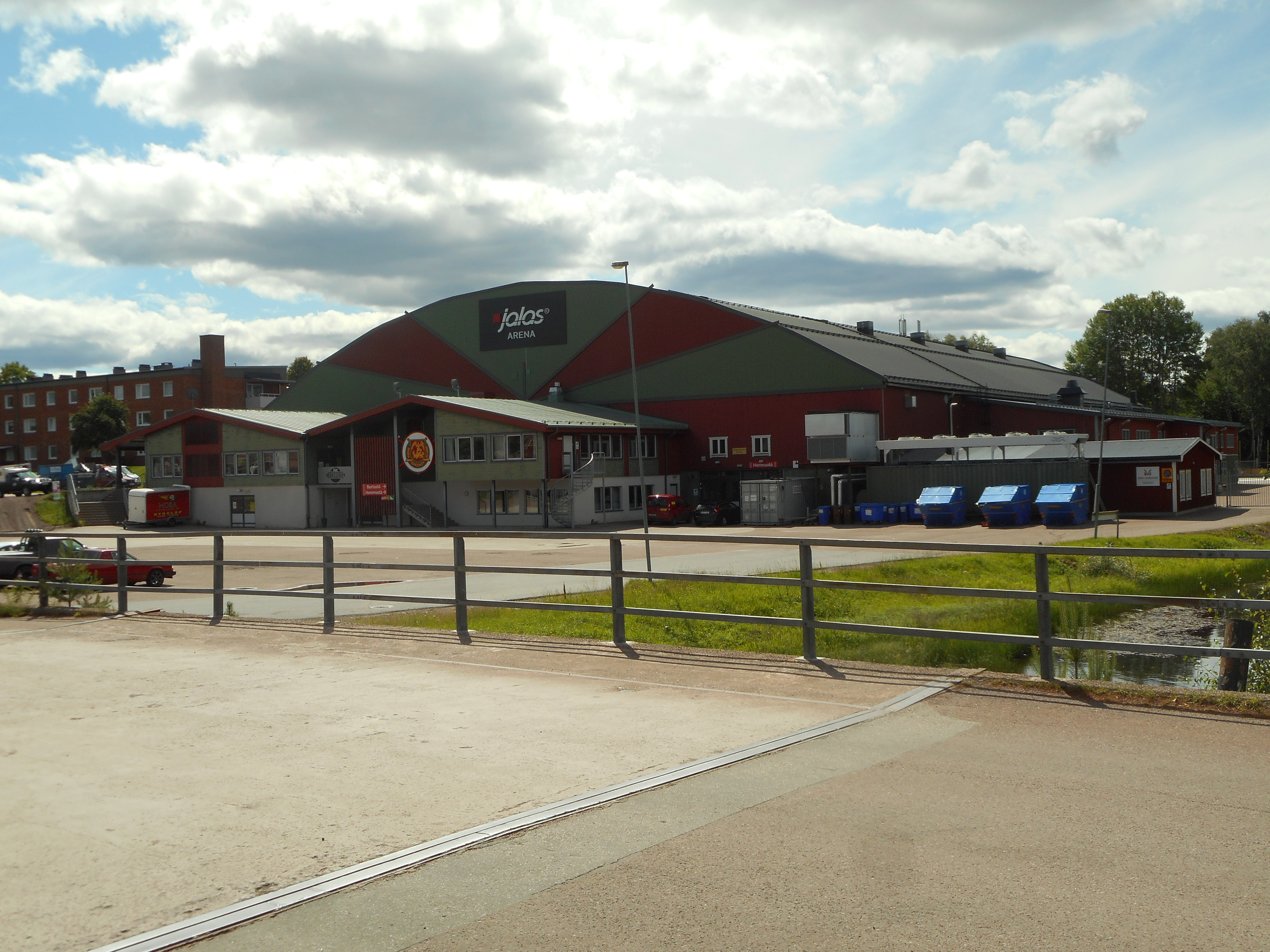
- July 2019 image
- Interactive map of Wibe Arena
- Former names: Mora Ishall (1967–2004); FM Mattsson Arena (2004–2015); Smidjegrav Arena (2015–2017); Jalas Arena (2017–2020); Smidjegrav Arena (2020–2025)
- Location: Mora, Sweden
- Owner: Mora Municipality
- Type: indoor ice rink

Construction
- Opened: 6 October 1967
- Renovated: 2004

Tenant
- Mora IK

Wibe Arena is an indoor sporting arena located in Mora, Sweden. The capacity of the arena is 4,500 and it was built in 1967. It is the home arena of the Mora IK ice hockey team. It was one of two sites for the 2007 World Junior Ice Hockey Championships, along with Ejendals Arena in Leksand.

The venue was renamed Smidjegrav Arena on 26 June 2015 following the expiration of FM Mattsson's naming rights deal.

The venue was renamed to Wibe Arena due to a sponsorship deal with Wibe Group on September 19th 2025.
