= Tom Pyatt =

Canadian ice hockey player (born 1987)

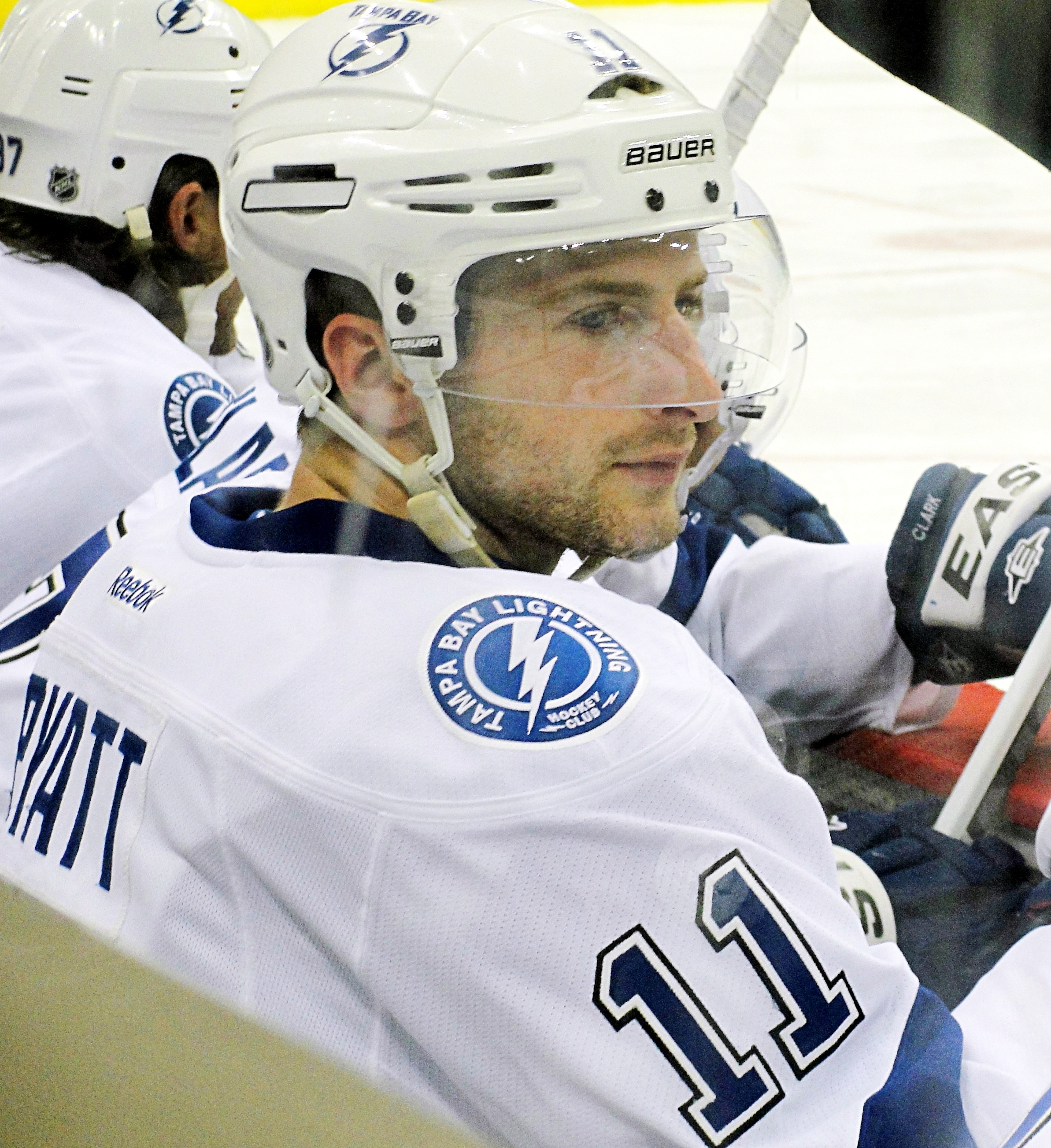
- Pyatt with the Tampa Bay Lightning in 2012
- Born: February 14, 1987 (age 39) Thunder Bay, Ontario, Canada
- Height: 5 ft 11 in (180 cm)
- Weight: 181 lb (82 kg; 12 st 13 lb)
- Position: Centre
- Shot: Left
- Played for: Montreal Canadiens; Tampa Bay Lightning; Genève-Servette HC; Ottawa Senators; Skellefteå AIK; SC Rapperswil-Jona Lakers
- NHL draft: 107th overall, 2005; New York Rangers
- Playing career: 2006–2020

Thomas Cullum Pyatt (born February 14, 1987) is a Canadian former professional ice hockey centre. He spent most of his career in the National Hockey League (NHL) with the Montreal Canadiens, Tampa Bay Lightning and Ottawa Senators. Pyatt also played in the National League (NL) with Genève-Servette HC and the SC Rapperswil-Jona Lakers and in the Swedish Hockey League (SHL) with Skellefteå AIK.

He is the son of former NHL player Nelson Pyatt and brother of retired hockey player Taylor Pyatt.

== Playing career ==
=== Junior ===
Pyatt grew up playing for the Thunder Bay Kings AAA program in his hometown of Thunder Bay, Ontario, with New York Rangers defenceman Marc Staal. He began his major junior career in 2003–04, having been drafted in the second round, 21st overall in the 2003 OHL Priority Selection by the Saginaw Spirit. After a 48-point season with the Spirit in his second OHL season, he was drafted 107th overall in the 2005 NHL entry draft by the New York Rangers.

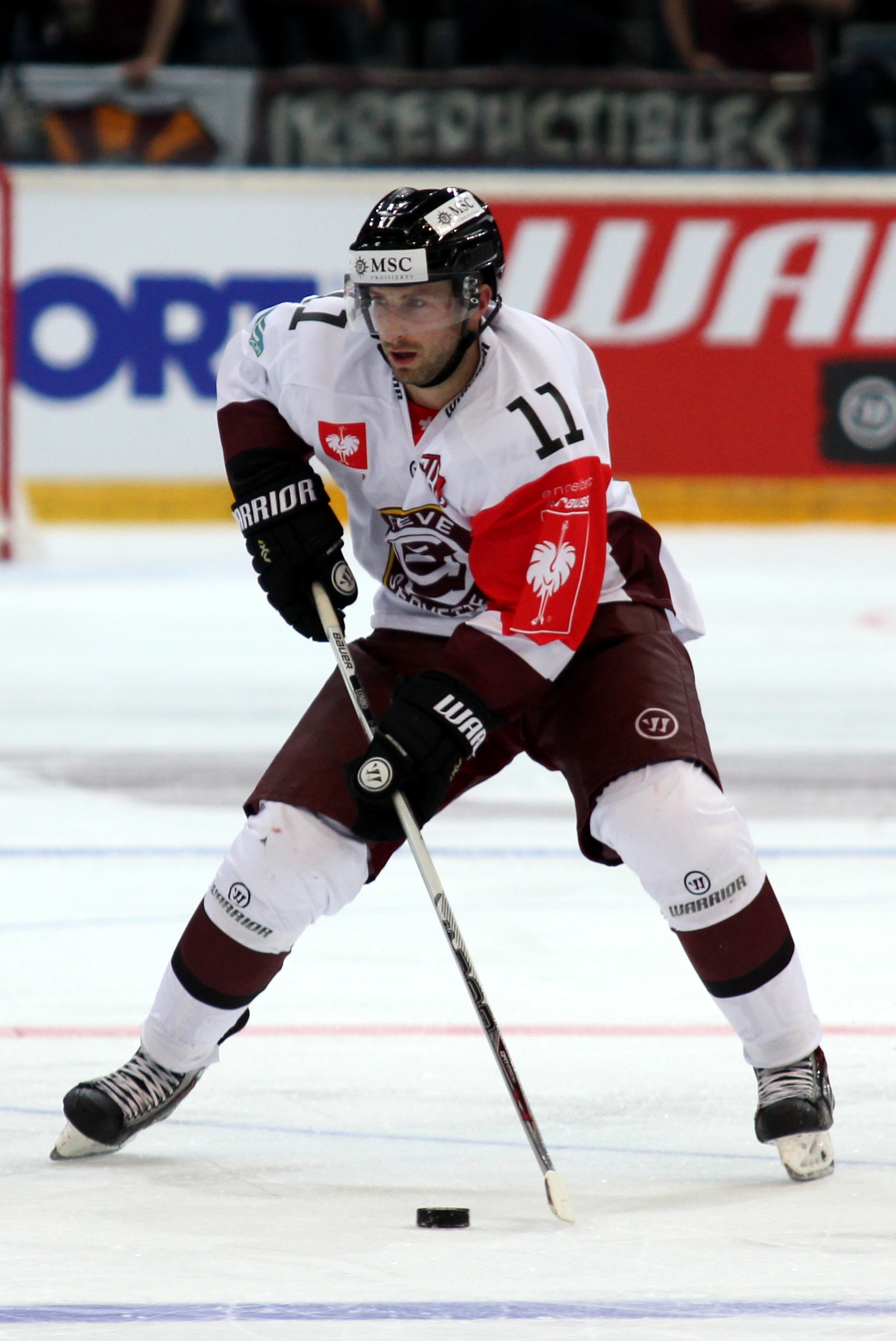
Pyatt during his tenure with Genève-Servette HC.

Upon being drafted, he returned to the OHL for two more seasons. Towards the end of an 81-point campaign for Pyatt in his fourth and final major junior season in 2006–07, the Rangers signed him to a three-year, entry-level contract on March 12, 2007. At the end of the season, he was awarded the William Hanley Trophy as the OHL's Most Sportsmanlike Player after accumulating just 18 penalty minutes.

=== Professional ===
Pyatt split his rookie professional season in 2007–08 with the Rangers' minor league affiliates, the Hartford Wolf Pack of the American Hockey League (AHL), tallying 14 points in 41 games, and Charlotte Checkers of the ECHL, tallying 15 points in 16 games.

On June 30, 2009, Pyatt was traded from the New York Rangers, along with Scott Gomez and Michael Busto, to the Montreal Canadiens for Chris Higgins, Ryan McDonagh, Pavel Valentenko and Doug Janik.

On November 5, 2009, he made his NHL debut against the Boston Bruins. On February 10, 2010 he scored his first NHL goal and assist on Michal Neuvirth of the Washington Capitals in a 6–5 Montreal Canadiens overtime win.

Pyatt became an unrestricted free agent after the 2010–11 season and on July 6, 2011, he signed a one-year deal with the Tampa Bay Lightning. On January 9, 2012, he signed a two-year extension with the Lightning.

On August 4, 2014, he agreed to a one-year contract with an optional second season with Genève-Servette HC of the National League (NL), to play alongside his brother, Taylor. On December 31, 2014, he won the 2014 Spengler Cup with Geneva.

On June 24, 2015, the Eagles activated his option for a second season in Calvin's city. He was selected to play for Team Canada at the 2015 Spengler Cup. He scored 4 points in 4 games en route to his second Spengler Cup title. He was a healthy scratch for the first round of the 2016 playoffs against Fribourg, and made his playoffs debut in game 2 of the second round against Lugano.

On May 24, 2016, the Ottawa Senators signed him to a one-year, two-way contract valued at $800,000 in the NHL and $200,000 in the AHL. This resulted in Pyatt being reunited with head coach Guy Boucher for the third time, who previously coached Pyatt when he was with both the Hamilton Bulldogs and Tampa Bay Lightning.

On June 26, 2017, Pyatt agreed to a two-year contract extension with the Senators worth $2.2 million.

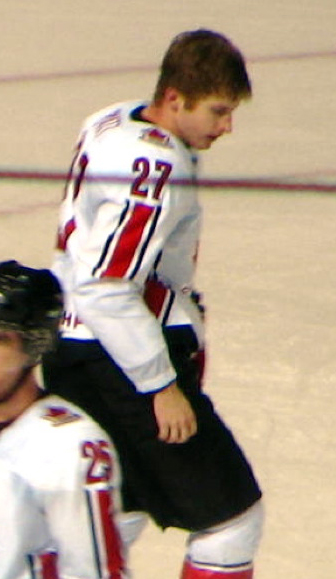
- Pyatt with Team Canada at the 2006 World Junior Championships.

Medal record

Representing Canada

Ice hockey

World Junior Championships
Gold medal – first place	2007 Leksand	
Gold medal – first place	2006 Vancouver	

IIHF U18 Championships
Silver medal – second place	2005 České Budějovice	

Spengler Cup
Gold medal – first place	2015 Davos	

In the 2018–19 season, while in the final year of his contract with the Senators, Pyatt regressed in posting just 2 assists in 37 games before he was placed on waivers on January 1, 2019. After clearing waivers, he was assigned to the AHL, however before he could report he was traded by the Senators, along with Mike McKenna and a 2019 sixth round pick, to the Vancouver Canucks in exchange for Anders Nilsson and Darren Archibald on January 2, 2019. He was assigned to continue in the AHL with affiliate, the Utica Comets. Adding a veteran presence with the Comets, Pyatt contributed offensively with 6 goals and 19 points in 36 games.

At the 2019 NHL entry draft, on June 22, 2019, Pyatt's NHL rights were included in a trade by the Canucks to the San Jose Sharks for an exchange of draft selections and Francis Perron. Un-signed by the Sharks, Pyatt returned to Europe as a free agent in securing a one-year contract with Swedish club, Skellefteå AIK of the SHL, on July 26, 2019.

On February 6, 2020, Pyatt parted ways with Skelleftea AIK to join the SC Rapperswil-Jona Lakers in the National League (NL) for the remainder of the season. He played 8 regular season games with the team, putting up 3 points, before becoming a free agent. Pyatt eventually retired from professional hockey following his short stint with the Lakers.

== Personal life ==
Pyatt has two brothers, including Taylor Pyatt, a former NHL player.

He married his longtime girlfriend, Mallory, in the summer of 2015. They had their first baby in December 2020.

== International play ==
During his third OHL season with the Saginaw Spirit, Pyatt was chosen to represent Team Canada at the 2006 World Junior Championships in Vancouver, helping them to a gold medal as the tournament host country. The next year, he returned to Team Canada for the 2007 World Junior Championships in Leksand. Pyatt helped Canada defeat Russia 4–2 in the final to capture his second straight gold medal (as well as Canada's third consecutive gold medal of a five-year run).

== Career statistics ==
=== Regular season and playoffs ===
			Regular season					Playoffs
Season	Team	League	GP	G	A	Pts	PIM	GP	G	A	Pts	PIM
2003–04	Saginaw Spirit	OHL	67	9	9	18	21	—	—	—	—	—
2004–05	Saginaw Spirit	OHL	57	18	30	48	14	—	—	—	—	—
2005–06	Saginaw Spirit	OHL	58	24	29	53	29	4	1	2	3	4
2006–07	Saginaw Spirit	OHL	58	43	38	81	18	6	3	5	8	0
2006–07	Hartford Wolf Pack	AHL	1	0	0	0	0	—	—	—	—	—
2007–08	Hartford Wolf Pack	AHL	41	4	7	11	6	3	0	0	0	0
2007–08	Charlotte Checkers	ECHL	16	6	9	15	8	3	0	0	0	0
2008–09	Hartford Wolf Pack	AHL	73	15	22	37	22	4	0	0	0	2
2009–10	Hamilton Bulldogs	AHL	41	13	22	35	8	—	—	—	—	—
2009–10	Montreal Canadiens	NHL	40	2	3	5	10	18	2	2	4	2
2010–11	Montreal Canadiens	NHL	61	2	5	7	9	7	0	0	0	0
2011–12	Tampa Bay Lightning	NHL	74	12	7	19	8	—	—	—	—	—
2012–13	Tampa Bay Lightning	NHL	43	8	8	16	12	—	—	—	—	—
2013–14	Tampa Bay Lightning	NHL	27	3	4	7	4	1	0	0	0	0
2014–15	Genève–Servette HC	NLA	50	11	22	33	10	11	2	8	10	0
2015–16	Genève–Servette HC	NLA	42	11	18	29	8	5	1	3	4	0
2016–17	Ottawa Senators	NHL	82	9	14	23	16	14	2	0	2	0
2017–18	Ottawa Senators	NHL	81	7	15	22	10	—	—	—	—	—
2018–19	Ottawa Senators	NHL	37	0	2	2	2	—	—	—	—	—
2018–19	Utica Comets	AHL	36	6	13	19	6	—	—	—	—	—
2019–20	Skellefteå AIK	SHL	38	4	8	12	4	—	—	—	—	—
2019–20	SC Rapperswil–Jona Lakers	NL	8	1	2	3	0	—	—	—	—	—
NHL totals			445	43	58	101	71	40	4	2	6	2
AHL totals			192	38	64	102	42	7	0	0	0	2

=== International ===
Year	Team	Event	Result	GP	G	A	Pts	PIM
2005	Canada	WJC18	2nd place, silver medalist(s)	6	3	2	5	4
2006	Canada	WJC	1st place, gold medalist(s)	6	1	0	1	16
2007	Canada	WJC	1st place, gold medalist(s)	6	1	3	4	2
2015	Canada	SC	1st place, gold medalist(s)	4	2	2	4	2
Junior totals				18	5	5	10	22
Senior totals				4	2	2	4	2

== Awards and honors ==
Award	Year
OHL
William Hanley Trophy	2007.
