= Alexander Bumagin =

Russian professional ice hockey player

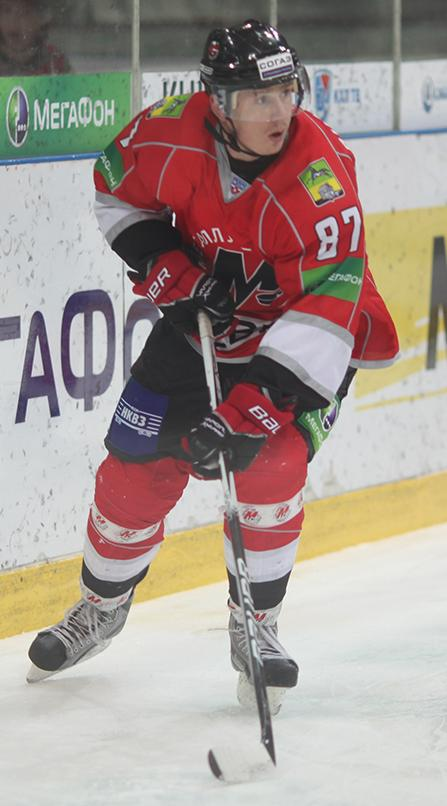
- Born: March 1, 1987 (age 39) Togliatti, Soviet Union
- Height: 6 ft 0 in (183 cm)
- Weight: 190 lb (86 kg; 13 st 8 lb)
- Position: Winger
- Shoots: Left
- Metal team Former teams: Frederikshavn White Hawks; Lada Togliatti; Atlant Moscow Oblast; Neftekhimik Nizhnekamsk; Metallurg Novokuznetsk; Avangard Omsk; Severstal Cherepovets; Avtomobilist Yekaterinburg
- NHL draft: 170th overall, 2006; Edmonton Oilers
- Playing career: 2004–present

Alexander Vladimirovich Bumagin (Russian: Александр Владимирович Бумагин; born March 1, 1987) is a Russian professional ice hockey player who currently plays with Danish club, Frederikshavn White Hawks in the Metal Ligaen (DEN). He was selected by the Edmonton Oilers in the 5th round (170th overall) of the 2006 NHL entry draft.

== Playing career ==
Bumagin played in Togliatti for two seasons. In 2004–05 he played in 7 games, scoring two goals and accumulating two penalty minutes. In 2005–06 he played in 40 games, scoring 9 goals and 14 assists for a total of 23 points, with 28 penalty minutes. During the 2010–11 campaign, Bumagin made a midseason transfer from Neftekhimik Nizhnekamsk to Metallurg Novokuznetsk.

== Career statistics ==
=== Regular season and playoffs ===
			Regular season					Playoffs
Season	Team	League	GP	G	A	Pts	PIM	GP	G	A	Pts	PIM
2002–03	Lada–2 Togliatti	RUS.3	11	3	2	5	4	—	—	—	—	—
2003–04	Lada–2 Togliatti	RUS.3	21	4	10	14	12	4	0	1	1	4
2004–05	Lada Togliatti	RSL	7	2	0	2	2	—	—	—	—	—
2004–05	Lada–2 Togliatti	RUS.3	27	19	7	26	46	—	—	—	—	—
2005–06	Lada Togliatti	RSL	40	9	12	21	28	8	0	3	3	4
2006–07	Lada Togliatti	RSL	41	2	3	5	18	3	0	0	0	0
2006–07	Lada–2 Togliatti	RUS.3	9	3	6	9	14	—	—	—	—	—
2007–08	Khimik Moscow Oblast	RSL	31	8	7	15	37	5	0	0	0	0
2007–08	Khimik–2 Moscow Oblast	RUS.3	11	6	7	13	4	—	—	—	—	—
2008–09	Atlant Moscow Oblast	KHL	40	4	7	11	20	6	2	1	3	0
2008–09	Atlant–2 Moscow Oblast	RUS.3	1	2	0	2	0	—	—	—	—	—
2009–10	Neftekhimik Nizhnekamsk	KHL	51	8	13	21	28	3	0	0	0	0
2010–11	Neftekhimik Nizhnekamsk	KHL	4	1	2	3	4	—	—	—	—	—
2010–11	Metallurg Novokuznetsk	KHL	39	6	5	11	24	—	—	—	—	—
2011–12	Metallurg Novokuznetsk	KHL	43	5	9	14	10	—	—	—	—	—
2012–13	Metallurg Novokuznetsk	KHL	47	15	22	37	14	—	—	—	—	—
2012–13	Avangard Omsk	KHL	3	0	0	0	0	3	1	0	1	0
2013–14	Severstal Cherepovets	KHL	30	3	6	9	2	—	—	—	—	—
2014–15	Avtomobilist Yekaterinburg	KHL	43	8	4	12	18	—	—	—	—	—
2015–16	Lada Togliatti	KHL	55	13	10	23	16	—	—	—	—	—
2016–17	Lada Togliatti	KHL	31	8	7	15	4	—	—	—	—	—
2017–18	Severstal Cherepovets	KHL	52	9	24	33	12	3	0	2	2	0
2018–19	Severstal Cherepovets	KHL	20	1	2	3	4	—	—	—	—	—
2018–19	Frederikshavn White Hawks	DEN	13	3	11	14	2	15	7	6	13	4
2019–20	Frederikshavn White Hawks	DEN	46	11	36	47	16	—	—	—	—	—
2020–21	Frederikshavn White Hawks	DEN	16	3	16	19	10	—	—	—	—	—
2021–22	Frederikshavn White Hawks	DEN	24	6	8	14	6	5	1	1	2	0
2022–23	Frederikshavn White Hawks	DEN	41	7	12	19	37	—	—	—	—	—
RSL totals			119	21	22	43	85	16	0	3	3	4
KHL totals			458	81	111	192	156	15	3	3	6	0
DEN totals			140	30	83	113	71	20	8	7	15	4

=== International ===
Year	Team	Event	Result	GP	G	A	Pts	PIM
2004	Russia	WHC17	5th	5	1	2	3	4
2004	Russia	U18	5th	5	1	0	1	2
2005	Russia	WJC18	5th	6	2	1	3	6
2007	Russia	WJC	2nd place, silver medalist(s)	6	2	6	8	16
Junior totals				22	6	9	15	28

== Honours ==
- Continental cup: 2006 (With Lada Togliatti)
