= Tegera Arena =

Indoor ice hockey venue in Leksand, Sweden

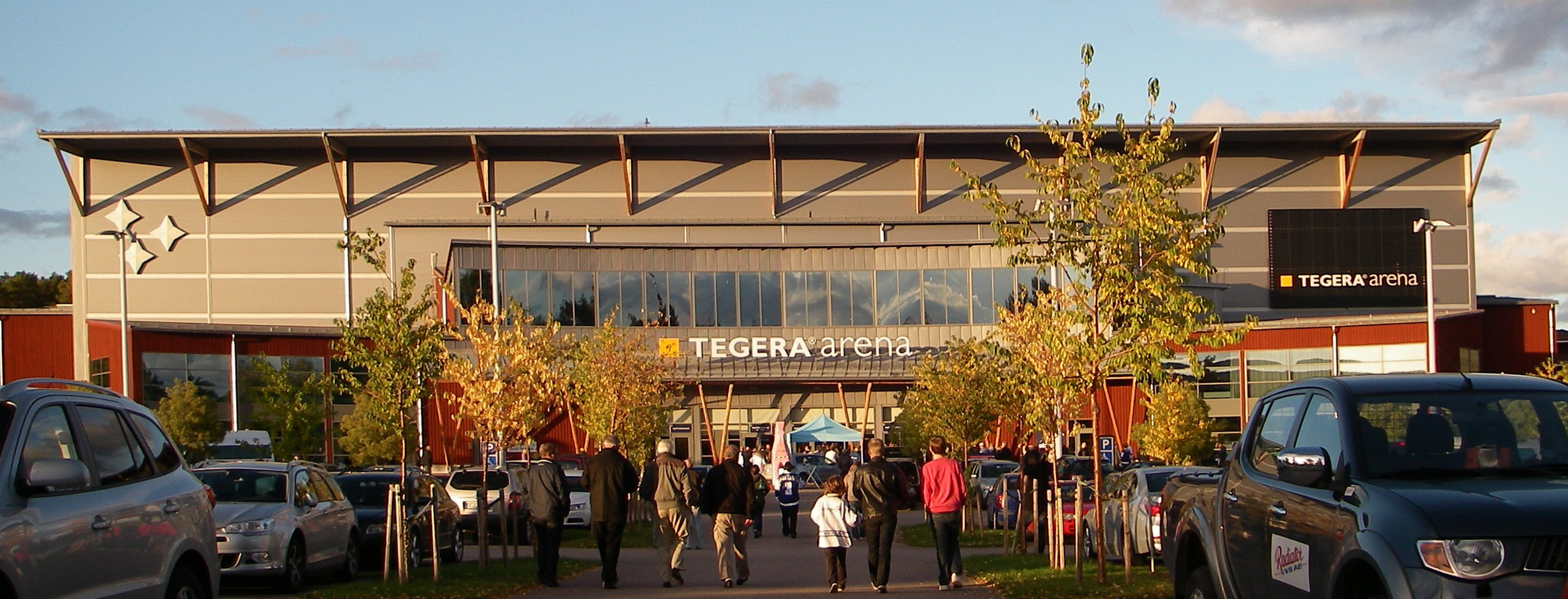
- Tegera Arena in September 2010
- Interactive map of Tegera Arena
- Former names: Ejendals Arena (2008–2010)
- Location: Leksand, Sweden
- Coordinates: 60°44′06″N 14°59′11″E
- Owner: Leksands IF Fastighets AB
- Capacity: Ice hockey: 7,650

Construction
- Groundbreaking: 5 July 2004
- Built: July 2004 to October 2005
- Opened: 3 October 2005 (first ice hockey game); 11 November 2005 (official inauguration)
- Cost: 129 million SEK
- Architect: Biong Arkitekter v/Terje Rørby-Stefan Ekberg - SWECO FFNS Falun

Tenant
- Leksands IF (SHL) (2005–present)

Tegera Arena (formerly Ejendals Arena) is an arena in Leksand, Sweden primarily used for ice hockey. It was opened in October 2005, and is the home arena of Leksands IF. It holds 7,650 people.

== History ==
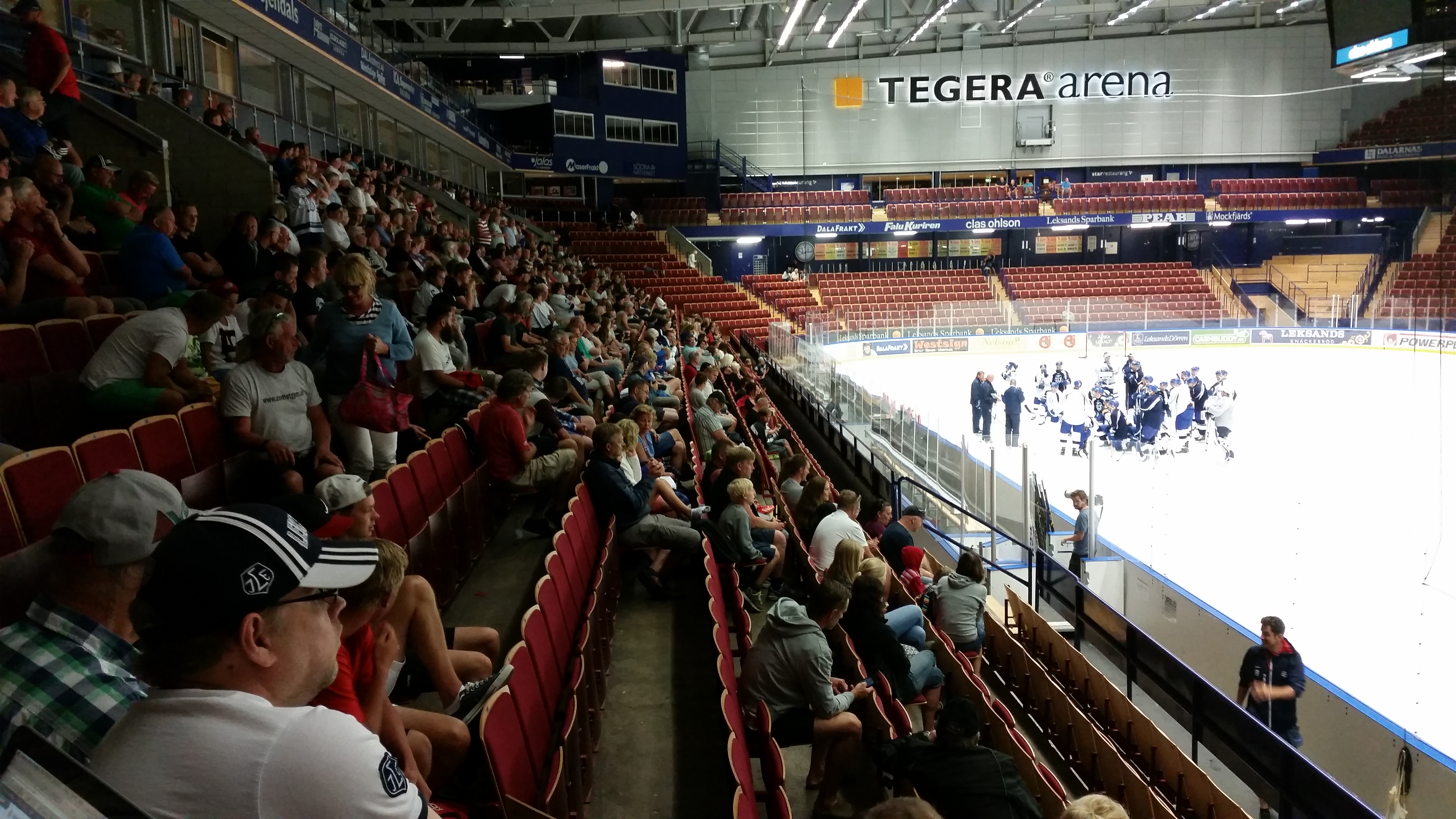
Interior of Tegera Arena (July 2014).

Construction of a new arena, replacing the former Leksands ishall from 1966, was announced on 27 April 2004. Construction began on 5 July the same year, and the first ice hockey game inside the arenas was played on 3 October 2005 when Leksands IF lost, 3–4, against Linköpings HC in the Swedish Hockey League. The arenas was officially inaugurated by County-Governor Ingrid Dahlberg of Dalarna on 11 November 2005.

The arena hosted games during the 2007 World Junior Ice Hockey Championships, together with FM Mattsson Arena in Mora. The following season, the 2007 4 Nations Cup was played at Tegera Arena. The current attendance record for ice hockey is 8,017. However, the maximum capacity has since been reduced to 7,650 due to safety regulations. Until fall 2010 the name was Ejendals Arena, but the company owning the name rights decided they wanted to promote a brand instead of their company name.

== Events ==
Event	Year
Melodifestivalen	2006, 2009, 2012, 2019

== See also ==
- Leksands IF
- List of indoor arenas in Sweden
