= Rene Kramer =

German ice hockey player

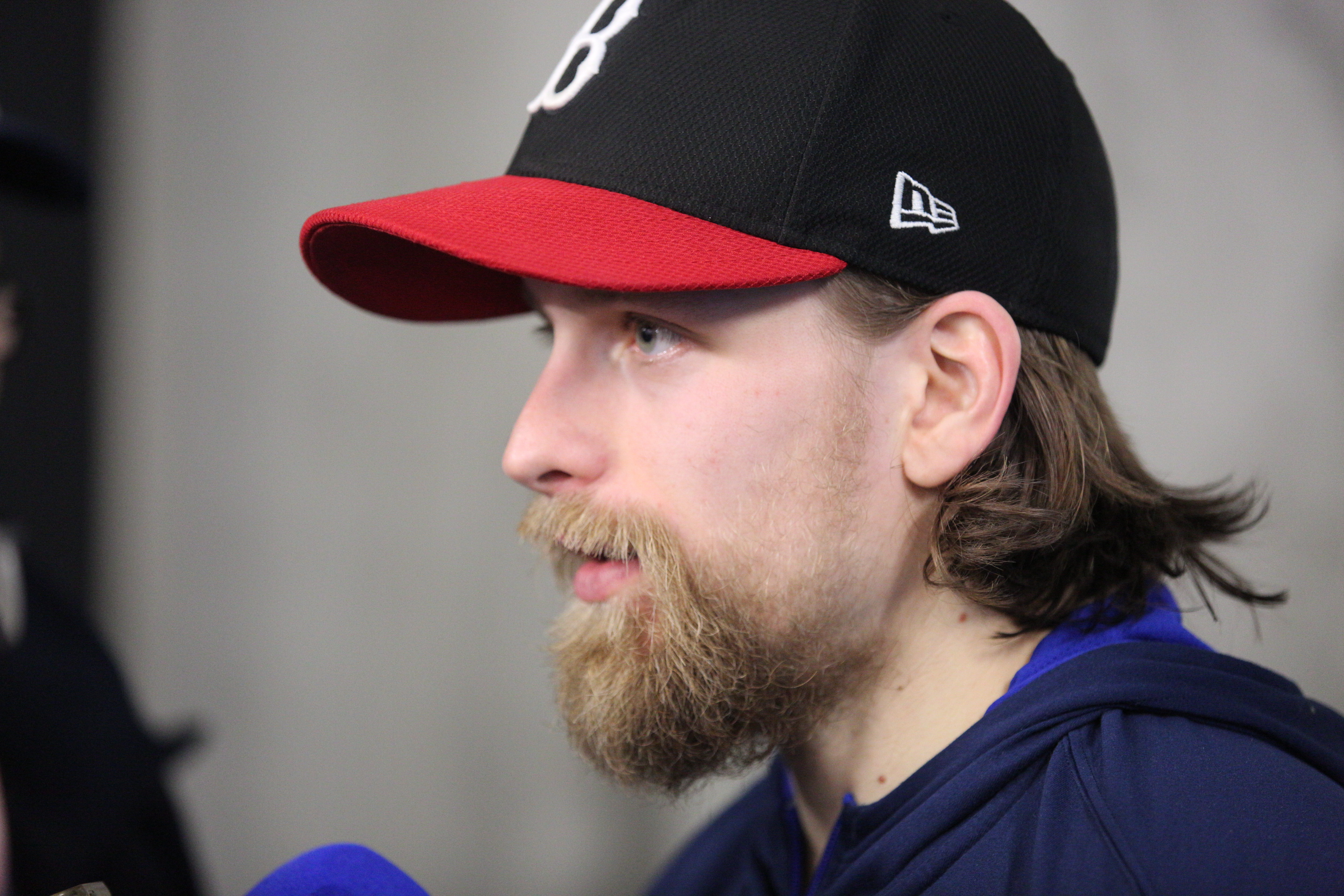
- Born: October 24, 1987 (age 37); Berlin, Germany
- Height: 5 ft 11 in (180 cm)
- Weight: 170 lb (77 kg; 12 st 2 lb)
- Position: Defence
- Shoots: Left
- DEL2 team Former teams: Dresdner Eislöwen; Eisbären Berlin; Kassel Huskies; EHC München; DEG Metro Stars; Straubing Tigers
- Playing career: 2004–present

Rene Kramer (born October 24, 1987) is a German professional ice hockey defenceman. He is currently playing for the Dresdner Eislöwen of the DEL2. He has previously played in the Deutsche Eishockey Liga with the Straubing Tigers after he was previously with the DEG Metro Stars.
