= Doug Janik =

American ice hockey player (born 1980)

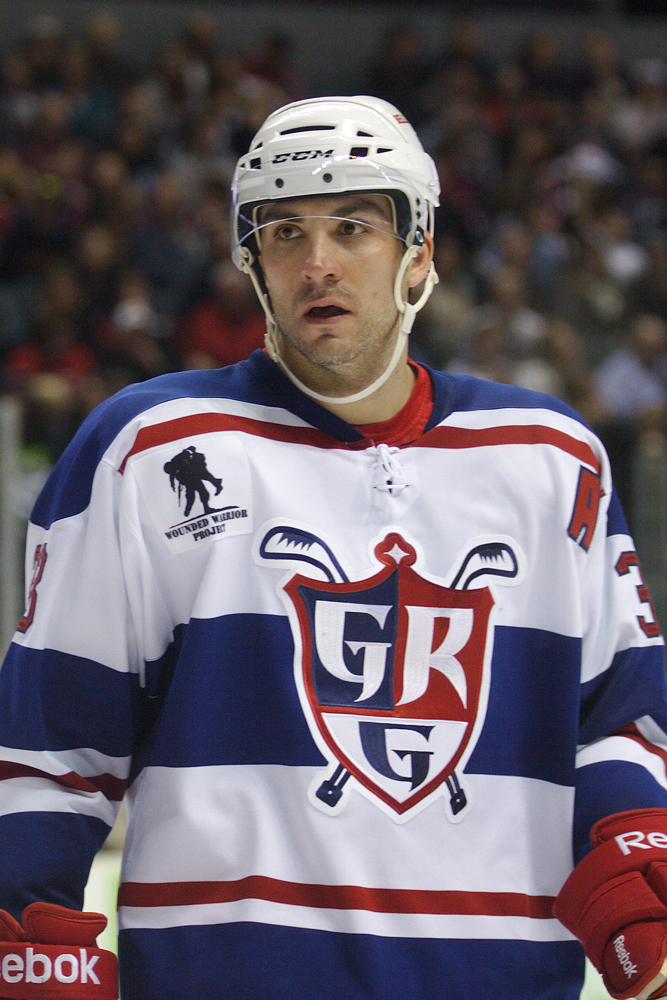
- Janik with the Grand Rapids Griffins in 2011
- Born: March 26, 1980 (age 46) Agawam, Massachusetts, U.S.
- Height: 6 ft 2 in (188 cm)
- Weight: 209 lb (95 kg; 14 st 13 lb)
- Position: Defense
- Shot: Left
- Played for: Buffalo Sabres; Tampa Bay Lightning; Dallas Stars; Montreal Canadiens; Detroit Red Wings; Adler Mannheim; Chicago Wolves; SV Kaltern
- National team: United States
- NHL draft: 55th overall, 1999; Buffalo Sabres
- Playing career: 2001–2015

Douglas John Janik (born March 26, 1980) is an American former professional ice hockey defenseman who played in the National Hockey League (NHL). He last played for the SV Kaltern of the Italian Serie A before ending his playing career.

== Playing career ==
As a youth, Janik played in the 1994 Quebec International Pee-Wee Hockey Tournament with a minor ice hockey team from Springfield, Massachusetts.

Janik was drafted 55th overall, in the second round, by the Buffalo Sabres in the 1999 NHL entry draft. Janik played collegiate hockey for the University of Maine before making his professional debut with the Sabres' affiliate, the Rochester Americans of the American Hockey League in 2001–02.

On July 6, 2006, Janik signed as a free agent with the Tampa Bay Lightning. He played his first full NHL season in 2006–07 and appeared in 136 games over two seasons.

Janik was signed as an unrestricted free agent by the Chicago Blackhawks on July 15, 2008; before playing for the Blackhawks, though, he was claimed off waivers by the Dallas Stars for the start of the 2008–09 season on October 2, 2008. He was then claimed off waivers by Chicago on October 8, only to be immediately traded back to Dallas for a conditional draft pick. After appearing in 13 games with the Stars and being used mainly as a reserve defenseman, he was traded to the Montreal Canadiens for Steve Bégin on February 26, 2009. After clearing waivers, Janik was then assigned to affiliate the Hamilton Bulldogs of the AHL. Janik played his first game with the Montreal Canadiens on April 6, 2009, against the Ottawa Senators.

Janik was traded by the Canadiens, along with Chris Higgins and Ryan McDonagh to the New York Rangers for Scott Gomez, Tom Pyatt, and Michael Busto on the eve of free agency on June 30, 2009.

Unsigned by the Rangers, Janik became a free agent and on July 8, 2009, signed a one-year contract with the Detroit Red Wings. After starting the 2009–10 season with AHL affiliate, the Grand Rapids Griffins, he made his Red Wing debut on November 3, 2009, against the Boston Bruins. He played 13 games with the Wings before recording a career high 37 points with the Griffins. On June 10, 2010, Janik was re-signed by the Red Wings to a two-year contract.

On July 12, 2012, Janik signed a one-year contract with Adler Mannheim of the German DEL. During the 2012–13 season, Janik contributed with 10 points in 40 games from the Blueline. He was not tendered a new contract offer at season's end.

On November 25, 2013, Janik signed with the San Antonio Rampage of the AHL. After 13 games with the Rampage, Janik's AHL rights were included in a trade to the Chicago Wolves on March 2, 2014.

On October 21, 2014, he signed as a free agent a contract with SV Caldaro of the Italian Serie A.

On July 21, 2015, Janik signalled the conclusion of his playing career upon accepting an assistant coaching position with the Arizona Coyotes AHL affiliate, the Springfield Falcons.

== Career statistics ==
=== Regular season and playoffs ===
			Regular season					Playoffs
Season	Team	League	GP	G	A	Pts	PIM	GP	G	A	Pts	PIM
1997–98	U.S. National Development Team	USDP	58	7	23	30	87	—	—	—	—	—
1998–99	University of Maine	HE	35	3	13	16	44	—	—	—	—	—
1999–00	University of Maine	HE	36	6	13	19	54	—	—	—	—	—
2000–01	University of Maine	HE	39	3	15	18	52	—	—	—	—	—
2001–02	Rochester Americans	AHL	80	6	17	23	100	2	0	0	0	0
2002–03	Rochester Americans	AHL	75	3	13	16	120	3	0	0	0	6
2002–03	Buffalo Sabres	NHL	6	0	0	0	2	—	—	—	—	—
2003–04	Rochester Americans	AHL	74	2	14	16	109	16	1	2	3	22
2003–04	Buffalo Sabres	NHL	4	0	0	0	19	—	—	—	—	—
2004–05	Rochester Americans	AHL	76	2	10	12	196	9	0	2	2	10
2005–06	Rochester Americans	AHL	71	5	19	24	161	—	—	—	—	—
2005–06	Buffalo Sabres	NHL	—	—	—	—	—	5	1	0	1	2
2006–07	Tampa Bay Lightning	NHL	75	2	9	11	53	1	0	0	0	0
2007–08	Tampa Bay Lightning	NHL	61	1	3	4	45	—	—	—	—	—
2008–09	Dallas Stars	NHL	13	0	1	1	2	—	—	—	—	—
2008–09	Rockford IceHogs	AHL	4	0	2	2	4	—	—	—	—	—
2008–09	Hamilton Bulldogs	AHL	18	0	5	5	10	6	0	0	0	7
2008–09	Montreal Canadiens	NHL	2	0	0	0	2	—	—	—	—	—
2009–10	Grand Rapids Griffins	AHL	66	6	31	37	84	—	—	—	—	—
2009–10	Detroit Red Wings	NHL	13	0	2	2	18	—	—	—	—	—
2010–11	Grand Rapids Griffins	AHL	60	5	17	22	77	—	—	—	—	—
2010–11	Detroit Red Wings	NHL	7	0	0	0	7	—	—	—	—	—
2011–12	Grand Rapids Griffins	AHL	67	10	23	33	74	—	—	—	—	—
2011–12	Detroit Red Wings	NHL	9	0	1	1	6	—	—	—	—	—
2012–13	Adler Mannheim	DEL	40	3	7	10	54	6	0	2	2	2
2013–14	San Antonio Rampage	AHL	13	1	7	8	8	—	—	—	—	—
2013–14	Chicago Wolves	AHL	9	1	3	4	8	—	—	—	—	—
2014–15	SV Kaltern	ITA	29	5	15	20	40	—	—	—	—	—
AHL totals			613	41	161	202	951	36	1	4	5	45
NHL totals			190	3	16	19	154	6	1	0	1	2
