= Ilya Zubov =

Russian ice hockey player (born 1987)

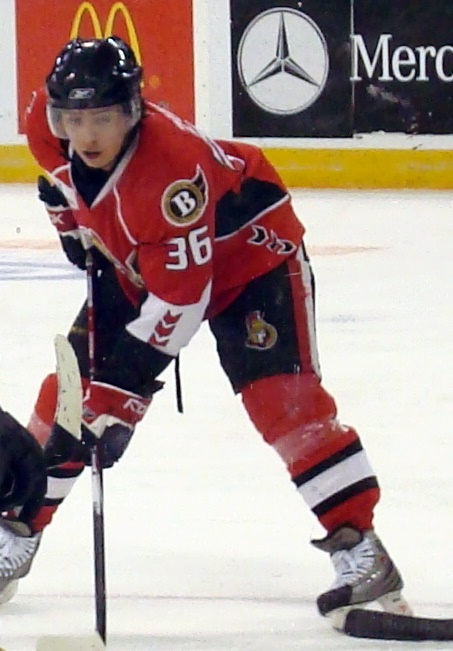
- Born: February 14, 1987 (age 39) Chelyabinsk, Soviet Union
- Height: 6 ft 0 in (183 cm)
- Weight: 200 lb (91 kg; 14 st 4 lb)
- Position: Centre
- Shoots: Left
- ICEHL team Former teams: Orli Znojmo; Spartak Moscow; Atlant Moscow Oblast; Salavat Yulaev Ufa; Ottawa Senators; CSKA Moscow; Admiral Vladivostok; Avangard Omsk; Amur Khabarovsk
- NHL draft: 98th overall, 2005; Ottawa Senators
- Playing career: 2002–present

Ilya Igorevich Zubov (Russian: Илья Игоревич Зубов; born February 14, 1987) is a Russian professional ice hockey player currently playing for Hc Tesla Orli Znojmo of the ICE Hockey League (ICEHL). He played two seasons in the American Hockey League (AHL) for the Binghamton Senators and ten games in the National Hockey League (NHL) for the Ottawa Senators.

== Playing career ==
Zubov's experience was playing centre for Salavat Yulaev Ufa, Spartak Moscow, and Atlant Moscow Oblast professional teams in the Russian Superleague (RSL). Zubov was acquired by the Ottawa Senators by drafting him 98th overall in the 2005 NHL entry draft. The pick had been acquired from the St. Louis Blues for Patrick Lalime.

Zubov publicly stated before the 2007-08 season that he would accept being sent to the Senators' AHL affiliate in Binghamton if he did not make the team in the 2007-08 season. This was expected and would provide the best chance at making the NHL team in the subsequent season given Ottawa GM Bryan Murray's insistence that he learn "North American hockey." Zubov was assigned to Binghamton on October 1, 2007.

In his first NHL pre-season game, Zubov scored the first goal in a 4-0 victory over the Philadelphia Flyers. Zubov committed to refining his physical game to accommodate the more aggressive NHL style and played the entire season in the AHL. While playing a primarily third and second-line checking role, Zubov scored 15 goals and 22 assists for 37 points in 70 games. During this time, he learned to initiate and absorb heavy contact and to engage in determined play down low. He, then, started working on the defensive side of his game. Residing in Ottawa, he worked with Senators strength and conditioning coach Randy Lee. Since the fall of 2007, Zubov gained over 20 lbs of muscle. Ilya had a great showing at the Senators Mini Development Camp in the summer of 2008, and hoped to crack the line-up in the 2008–09 season. Zubov played the majority of the season with Binghamton once again but was called up for ten games to Ottawa and scored two assists for his first NHL points.

In the 2009–10 season, Zubov was again demoted to the Binghamton Senators from the Ottawa Senators's training camp. Disappointed with his demotion, on September 30, 2009, he demanded a trade to another organization. On October 7, he left Binghamton and was given permission by Ottawa to sign with a Russian team. His NHL rights were retained by Ottawa. On October 19, it was announced that Zubov would be loaned to his old team -Salavat Yulaev Ufa- for the season.

In 2009, Zubov signed with CSKA Moscow. Zubov would play four and a half seasons with CSKA before being transferred to Admiral Vladivostok in December 2013. On July 1, 2014, Zubov became an NHL free agent with his right's expired with the Senators, he opted to continue his career in the KHL.

== Career statistics ==
=== Regular season and playoffs ===
			Regular season					Playoffs
Season	Team	League	GP	G	A	Pts	PIM	GP	G	A	Pts	PIM
2002–03	Traktor Chelyabinsk	RUS-2	1	0	0	0	2	—	—	—	—	—
2002–03	Traktor–2 Chelyabinsk	RUS-3	28	2	7	9	8	—	—	—	—	—
2003–04	Traktor Chelyabinsk	RUS-2	33	7	7	14	16	8	2	1	3	2
2004–05	Traktor Chelyabinsk	RUS-2	40	9	8	17	36	—	—	—	—	—
2004–05	Traktor–2 Chelyabinsk	RUS-3	1	0	0	0	0	—	—	—	—	—
2005–06	Spartak Moscow	RSL	43	4	8	12	12	3	2	2	4	0
2005–06	Spartak–2 Moscow	RUS-3	1	0	1	1	4	—	—	—	—	—
2006–07	Khimik Mytishchi	RSL	16	1	1	2	4	—	—	—	—	—
2006–07	Khimik–2 Mytishchi	RUS-3	1	0	1	1	0	—	—	—	—	—
2006–07	Salavat Yulaev Ufa	RSL	26	3	7	10	4	8	2	3	5	2
2007–08	Ottawa Senators	NHL	1	0	0	0	0	—	—	—	—	—
2007–08	Binghamton Senators	AHL	74	15	23	38	18	—	—	—	—	—
2008–09	Ottawa Senators	NHL	10	0	2	2	0	—	—	—	—	—
2008–09	Binghamton Senators	AHL	63	14	38	52	26	—	—	—	—	—
2009–10	Binghamton Senators	AHL	1	0	0	0	2	—	—	—	—	—
2009–10	Salavat Yulaev Ufa	KHL	25	3	3	6	6	—	—	—	—	—
2009–10	CSKA Moscow	KHL	6	1	0	1	2	3	0	1	1	2
2010–11	CSKA Moscow	KHL	46	8	21	29	29	—	—	—	—	—
2011–12	CSKA Moscow	KHL	52	9	15	24	16	4	0	0	0	32
2012–13	CSKA Moscow	KHL	43	5	7	12	22	5	0	1	1	4
2013–14	CSKA Moscow	KHL	25	3	9	12	18	—	—	—	—	—
2013–14	Admiral Vladivostok	KHL	11	1	4	5	10	5	3	2	5	4
2014–15	Admiral Vladivostok	KHL	51	7	28	35	32	—	—	—	—	—
2015–16	Avangard Omsk	KHL	53	8	22	30	10	11	3	7	10	6
2016–17	Avangard Omsk	KHL	44	4	13	17	35	12	3	3	6	8
2017–18	Salavat Yulaev Ufa	KHL	40	5	15	20	31	8	2	1	3	2
2018–19	Spartak Moscow	KHL	57	10	23	33	12	6	1	4	5	4
2019–20	Spartak Moscow	KHL	54	9	26	35	20	6	2	2	4	0
2020–21	Spartak Moscow	KHL	26	3	7	10	6	3	0	0	0	0
2021–22	Amur Khabarovsk	KHL	10	0	0	0	8	—	—	—	—	—
2021–22	Orli Znojmo	ICEHL	34	3	21	24	8	5	1	1	2	0
NHL totals			11	0	2	2	0	—	—	—	—	—
KHL totals			543	76	193	269	257	63	14	21	35	62

=== International ===
Year	Team	Event	GP	G	A	Pts	PIM
2004	Russia	U18	5	2	2	4	6
2005	Russia	WJC18	6	3	5	8	6
2006	Russia	WJC	6	2	4	6	10
2007	Russia	WJC	6	3	1	4	6
Junior totals			23	10	12	22	28
