= Alexander Sundström =

Swedish-Canadian ice hockey player, coach (born 1987)

- Born: March 14, 1987 (age 38); Vancouver, British Columbia, Canada
- Height: 6 ft 0 in (183 cm)
- Weight: 196 lb (89 kg; 14 st 0 lb)
- Position: Centre
- Shot: Left
- NHL draft: 218th overall, 2005; New Jersey Devils
- Playing career: 2004–2017

Patrik Alexander Sundström (born March 14, 1987) is a Swedish-Canadian hockey coach and former player. He played for IF Björklöven, Brynäs IF, Mora IK in the Swedish Allsvenskan.

Born in Vancouver, British Columbia, Sundström was drafted by the New Jersey Devils in the seventh round, 218th overall, in the 2005 draft from IF Björklöven. His father is former NHLer Patrik Sundström who played for the Vancouver Canucks and New Jersey Devils.

== Career statistics ==
=== Regular season and playoffs ===
			Regular season					Playoffs
Season	Team	League	GP	G	A	Pts	PIM	GP	G	A	Pts	PIM
2002–03	IF Björklöven	J20	5	2	0	2	2	—	—	—	—	—
2003–04	IF Björklöven	J18 Allsv	7	2	1	3	4	—	—	—	—	—
2003–04	IF Björklöven	SWE.2 U20	—	—	—	—	—	—	—	—	—	—
2004–05	IF Björklöven	SWE.2 U20	—	—	—	—	—	—	—	—	—	—
2004–05	IF Björklöven	Allsv	9	0	0	0	0	—	—	—	—	—
2005–06	IF Björklöven	J20	29	16	14	30	22	5	1	0	1	4
2005–06	IF Björklöven	Allsv	3	0	0	0	0	—	—	—	—	—
2006–07	IF Björklöven	Allsv	28	2	8	10	12	10	2	3	5	8
2007–08	Brynäs IF	J20	1	1	0	1	2	—	—	—	—	—
2007–08	Brynäs IF	SEL	44	3	4	7	14	—	—	—	—	—
2008–09	Brynäs IF	SEL	36	4	5	9	12	4	0	0	0	2
2009–10	Brynäs IF	SEL	55	4	5	9	30	5	0	1	1	4
2010–11	Brynäs IF	SEL	53	3	5	8	14	5	0	0	0	6
2011–12	Mora IK	Allsv	20	5	5	10	12	—	—	—	—	—
2012–13	IF Björklöven	SWE.3	15	5	11	16	0	12	5	1	6	2
2013–14	IF Björklöven	Allsv	31	4	2	6	20	10	1	3	4	2
2014–15	Herlev Eagles	DEN	26	3	12	15	18	—	—	—	—	—
2015–16	Herlev Eagles	DEN	8	1	5	6	8	—	—	—	—	—
2016–17	Herlev Eagles	DEN	31	3	13	16	20	—	—	—	—	—
2016–17	IF Björklöven	Allsv	7	0	1	1	2	—	—	—	—	—
Allsv totals			98	11	16	27	46	20	3	6	9	10
SEL totals			188	14	19	33	70	14	0	1	1	12

=== International ===
Year	Team	Event	GP	G	A	Pts	PIM
2007	Sweden	WJC	7	2	0	2	2
Junior totals			7	2	0	2	2
