= Martin Johansson (ice hockey, born 1987) =

Swedish ice hockey player

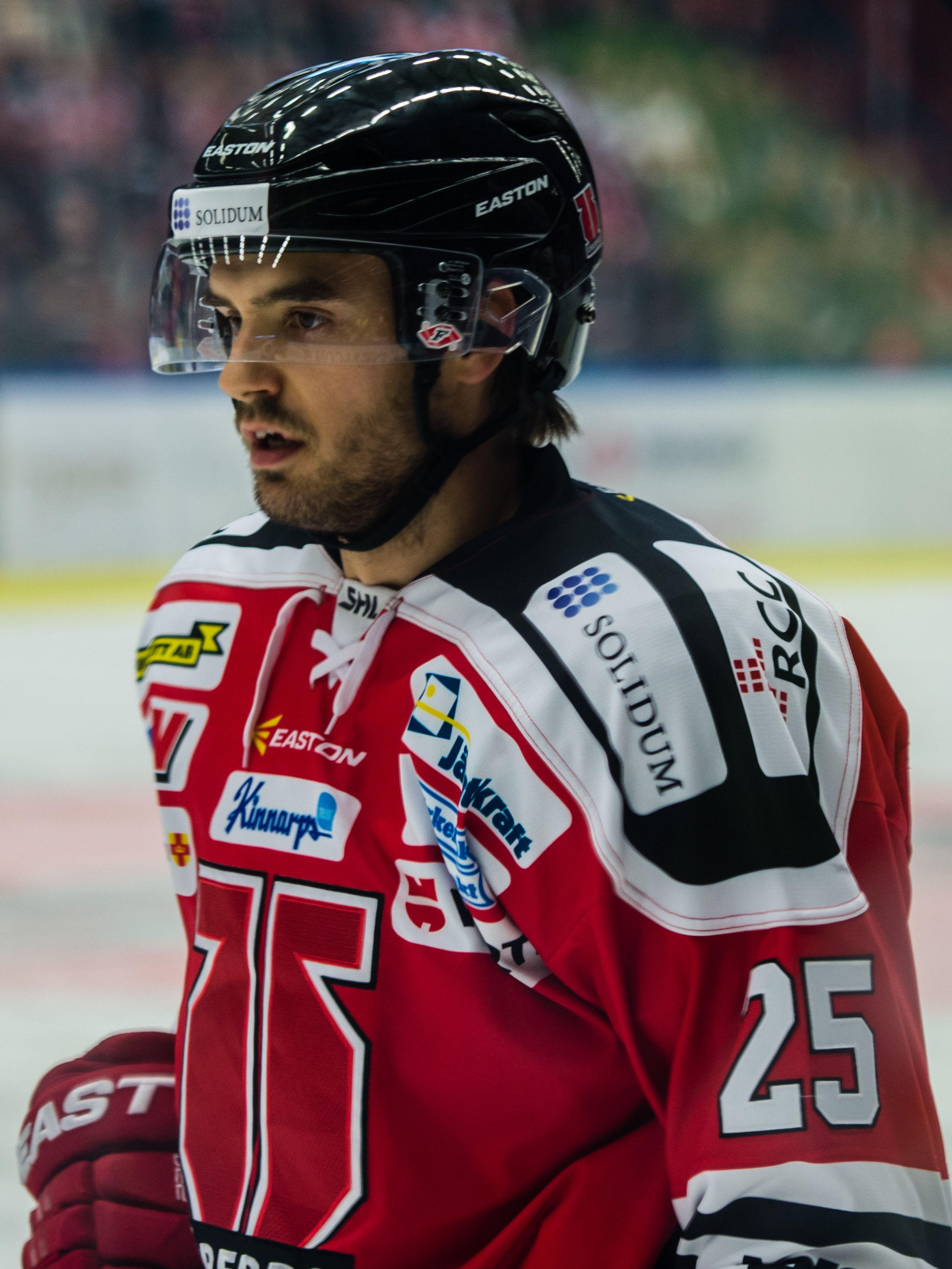
- Born: October 24, 1987 (age 37) Landskrona, Sweden
- Height: 5 ft 11 in (180 cm)
- Weight: 198 lb (90 kg; 14 st 2 lb)
- Position: Left wing
- Shot: Left
- Played for: Brynäs IF; Örebro HK; Färjestad BK; HC TPS; IK Oskarshamn
- Playing career: 2006–2024

Martin Johansson (born October 24, 1987) is a Swedish former professional ice hockey player. He played most notably in the Swedish Hockey League (SHL). He represented Sweden in the World Junior Championship in 2007, leading the fourth place Swedish team with three goals.

Martin is the older brother of Marcus Johansson.
