= Alexander Loginov (ice hockey) =

Russian ice hockey player

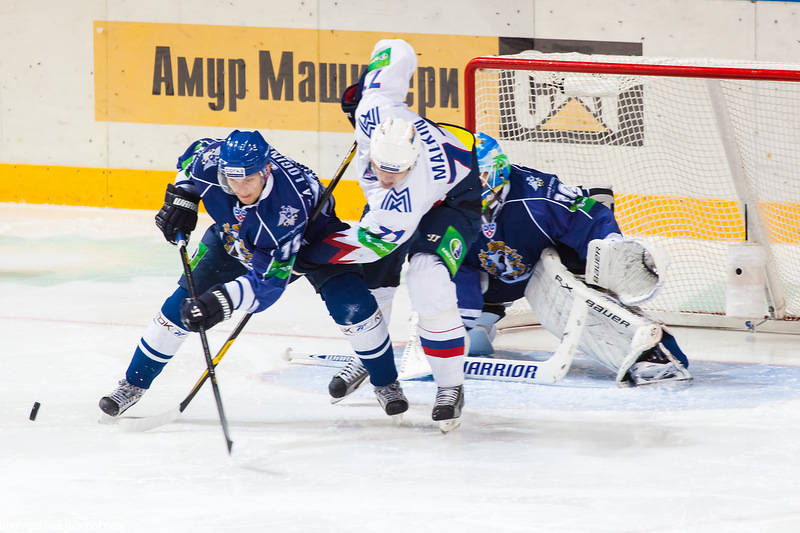
- Born: 18 February 1987 (age 39) Ufa, Russian SFSR, USSR
- Height: 6 ft 0 in (183 cm)
- Weight: 205 lb (93 kg; 14 st 9 lb)
- Position: Defence
- Shot: Left
- Played for: Salavat Yulaev Ufa; HC Karlovy Vary; Torpedo Nizhny Novgorod; Avtomobilist Yekaterinburg; Amur Khabarovsk; Avtomobilist Yekaterinburg; Sibir Novosibirsk; Neftekhimik Nizhnekamsk; SC Csíkszereda
- Playing career: 2005–2021

Alexander Yuryevich Loginov (Russian: Александр Юрьевич Логинов; born 18 February 1987) is a Russian former professional ice hockey defenceman currently playing for SC Csíkszereda of the Erste Liga.

He previously joined HC Sibir Novosibirsk of the Kontinental Hockey League (KHL) as a free agent on a two-year contract following his second stint with original club, Salavat Yulaev Ufa, on May 2, 2018.

== Career statistics ==
			Regular season					Playoffs
Season	Team	League	GP	G	A	Pts	PIM	GP	G	A	Pts	PIM
2003–04	Salavat Yulaev Ufa-2	Russia3	25	1	2	3	16	—	—	—	—	—
2004–05	Salavat Yulaev Ufa-2	Russia3	56	3	8	11	30	—	—	—	—	—
2005–06	Salavat Yulaev Ufa	Russia	32	0	1	1	10	6	0	0	0	2
2005–06	Salavat Yulaev Ufa-2	Russia3	16	5	6	11	10	—	—	—	—	—
2006–07	Salavat Yulaev Ufa	Russia	46	1	5	6	42	8	1	2	3	10
2007–08	Salavat Yulaev Ufa	Russia	6	0	0	0	4	1	0	0	0	0
2007–08	Salavat Yulaev Ufa-2	Russia3	20	8	11	19	20	—	—	—	—	—
2008–09	Toros Neftekamsk	Russia2	15	2	1	3	12	7	2	1	3	4
2009–10	Toros Neftekamsk	Russia2	22	3	6	9	6	—	—	—	—	—
2009–10	HC Energie Karlovy Vary	Czech	16	4	8	12	6	—	—	—	—	—
2010–11	Torpedo Nizhny Novgorod	KHL	38	2	5	7	20	—	—	—	—	—
2011–12	Avtomobilist Yekaterinburg	KHL	36	2	6	8	16	—	—	—	—	—
2012–13	Amur Khabarovsk	KHL	49	2	6	8	34	—	—	—	—	—
2013–14	Amur Khabarovsk	KHL	40	2	9	11	22	—	—	—	—	—
2014–15	Amur Khabarovsk	KHL	23	1	6	7	14	—	—	—	—	—
2014–15	Avtomobilist Yekaterinburg	KHL	24	3	4	7	10	1	0	0	0	0
2015–16	Avtomobilist Yekaterinburg	KHL	8	1	1	2	2	—	—	—	—	—
2015–16	Salavat Yulaev Ufa	KHL	47	10	23	33	22	19	1	5	6	13
2016–17	Salavat Yulaev Ufa	KHL	60	10	10	20	16	5	0	0	0	2
2017–18	Salavat Yulaev Ufa	KHL	47	4	7	11	34	11	1	1	2	2
2018–19	HC Sibir Novosibirsk	KHL	50	8	9	17	18	—	—	—	—	—
2019–20	HC Sibir Novosibirsk	KHL	49	2	7	9	18	5	0	1	1	2
2020–21	HC Neftekhimik Nizhnekamsk	KHL	23	0	1	1	10	—	—	—	—	—
2020–21	SC Csikszereda	Erste Liga	12	2	7	9	—	12	4	6	10	—
2020–21	SC Csikszereda	Romania	7	4	6	10	2	9	4	8	12	4
Russia totals			84	1	6	7	56	15	1	2	3	12
KHL totals			494	47	94	141	236	41	2	7	9	19
Czech totals			16	4	8	12	6	—	—	—	—	—
