= Magnus Isaksson =

Swedish ice hockey player

- Born: January 16, 1987 (age 38) Piteå, Sweden
- Height: 5 ft 9 in (175 cm)
- Weight: 180 lb (82 kg; 12 st 12 lb)
- Position: Centre
- Shot: Left
- Played for: Luleå HF; IF Björklöven; Borås HC; Tingsryds AIF; Piteå HC; Skellefteå AIK; Rosvik IK
- Playing career: 2005–2024

Magnus Isaksson (born January 16, 1987, in Piteå, Sweden) is a professional Swedish ice hockey player. He is currently playing for IF Björklöven in HockeyAllsvenskan.

== Career statistics ==
			Regular season					Playoffs
Season	Team	League	GP	G	A	Pts	PIM	GP	G	A	Pts	PIM
2003–04	Luleå HF J18	J18 Allsvenskan	14	15	5	20	10	7	3	0	3	2
2003–04	Luleå HF J20	J20 SuperElit	5	1	0	1	0	—	—	—	—	—
2004–05	Luleå HF J18	J18 Allsvenskan	1	0	0	0	0	—	—	—	—	—
2004–05	Luleå HF J20	J20 SuperElit	34	8	14	22	18	7	1	1	2	6
2005–06	Luleå HF J20	J20 SuperElit	7	3	4	7	2	4	1	2	3	10
2005–06	Luleå HF	Elitserien	50	3	2	5	18	4	0	0	0	25
2006–07	Luleå HF	Elitserien	50	0	4	4	28	4	1	0	1	2
2007–08	Luleå HF J20	J20 SuperElit	1	0	1	1	0	—	—	—	—	—
2007–08	Luleå HF	Elitserien	54	2	7	9	20	—	—	—	—	—
2008–09	IF Björklöven	HockeyAllsvenskan	44	7	12	19	24	—	—	—	—	—
2009–10	IF Björklöven	HockeyAllsvenskan	52	7	14	21	26	—	—	—	—	—
2010–11	Borås HC	HockeyAllsvenskan	52	4	11	15	12	—	—	—	—	—
2011–12	Borås HC	HockeyAllsvenskan	52	7	7	14	26	—	—	—	—	—
2012–13	Borås HC	Hockeyettan	29	5	13	18	18	10	7	6	13	2
2012–13	Tingsryds AIF	HockeyAllsvenskan	1	0	0	0	0	—	—	—	—	—
2013–14	Piteå HC	Hockeyettan	43	23	47	70	26	10	4	3	7	14
2014–15	Piteå HC	Hockeyettan	34	14	31	45	32	4	1	2	3	2
2015–16	Piteå HC	Hockeyettan	36	13	31	44	14	6	4	2	6	16
2016–17	Piteå HC	Hockeyettan	34	10	25	35	18	6	1	2	3	4
2017–18	Piteå HC	Hockeyettan	38	13	41	54	18	14	3	6	9	8
2018–19	Piteå HC	Hockeyettan	36	10	42	52	12	4	1	5	6	2
2019–20	Piteå HC	Hockeyettan	33	17	32	49	16	3	0	2	2	0
2019–20	Skellefteå AIK	SHL	5	0	0	0	0	—	—	—	—	—
2020–21	Piteå HC	Hockeyettan	38	22	30	52	14	5	2	3	5	4
2021–22	Piteå HC	Hockeyettan	42	14	28	42	8	2	1	0	1	0
2022–23	Piteå HC	Hockeyettan	34	10	29	39	8	18	6	6	12	0
2023–24	Rosvik IK	Division 2	22	21	28	49	8	5	4	4	8	4
SHL (Elitserien) totals			159	5	13	18	66	8	1	0	1	27
HockeyAllsvenskan totals			201	25	44	69	88	—	—	—	—	—
Hockeyettan totals			397	151	349	500	184	82	30	37	67	52
