= 2016–17 HockeyAllsvenskan season =

- League: HockeyAllsvenskan
- Sport: Ice hockey
- Duration: 2016 – 2017 (regular season)
- Number of teams: 14
- Total attendance: 959,914 (regular season)
- Average attendance: 2,637 (regular season)
- TV partner(s): TV4 Group
- First place: Mora IK
- Top scorer: Victor Ejdsell (BIK)
- Promoted to SHL: Mora IK
- Relegated to Hockeyettan: VIK Västerås HK

HockeyAllsvenskan seasons
- ← 2015–16 2017–18 →

The 2016–17 HockeyAllsvenskan season was the 12th season since the second tier of ice hockey in Sweden was renamed. The league featured 14 teams, each playing each other four times, for a total of 52 regular season games.

== Participating teams ==
HockeyAllsvenskan team map

Team	City	Arena	Capacity
AIK	Stockholm	Hovet	8,094
Almtuna IS	Uppsala	Metallåtervinning Arena	2,800
IF Björklöven	Umeå	T3 Center	5,400
BIK Karlskoga	Karlskoga	Nobelhallen	6,300
Modo Hockey	Örnsköldsvik	Fjällräven Center	7,600
Mora IK	Mora	Smidjegrav Arena	4,514
IK Oskarshamn	Oskarshamn	Arena Oskarshamn	3,346
IK Pantern	Malmö	Malmö Isstadion	5,800
Södertälje SK	Södertälje	AXA Sports Center	6,200
Timrå IK	Timrå	NHK Arena	6,000
Tingsryds AIF	Tingsryd	Nelson Garden Arena	3,400
Västerviks IK	Västervik	Plivit Trade-hallen	2,500
VIK Västerås HK	Västerås	ABB Arena Nord	4,902
HC Vita Hästen	Norrköping	Himmelstalundshallen	4,280

== Regular season ==
=== Standings ===
Pos	Team	Pld	W	OTW	OTL	L	GF	GA	GD	Pts	Qualification or relegation
1	Mora IK (P)	52	31	4	4	13	162	117	+45	105	Advance to the HockeyAllsvenskan finals
2	BIK Karlskoga	52	27	7	2	16	161	110	+51	97	Advance to the HockeyAllsvenskan finals
3	Västerviks IK	52	25	5	5	17	138	117	+21	90	Advance to the HockeyAllsvenskan playoffs
4	IK Pantern	52	22	7	9	14	136	124	+12	89	Advance to the HockeyAllsvenskan playoffs
5	AIK	52	23	5	6	18	148	137	+11	85	Advance to the HockeyAllsvenskan playoffs
6	Timrå IK	52	22	7	3	20	130	121	+9	83	Advance to the HockeyAllsvenskan playoffs
7	Tingsryds AIF	52	22	6	4	20	139	121	+18	82	Advance to the HockeyAllsvenskan playoffs
8	Almtuna IS	52	22	3	5	22	149	136	+13	77	Advance to the HockeyAllsvenskan playoffs
9	IK Oskarshamn	52	16	6	9	21	123	140	−17	69	
10	HC Vita Hästen	52	16	6	7	23	117	128	−11	67	
11	IF Björklöven	52	20	1	5	26	137	181	−44	67	
12	Modo Hockey	52	16	7	4	25	133	155	−22	66	
13	VIK Västerås HK (R)	52	17	4	6	25	114	142	−28	65	Advance to the HockeyAllsvenskan qualifiers
14	Södertälje SK	52	13	4	3	32	106	164	−58	50	Advance to the HockeyAllsvenskan qualifiers

(P) Promoted; (R) Relegated

== Post-season ==
=== Finals ===
In the HockeyAllsvenskan finals (Swedish: HockeyAllsvenska finalen), the first and second place teams from the regular season met in a best-of-five series, where the winner advanced to the SHL qualifiers, and the losing team continued to a playoff to the SHL qualifiers. The matches were held on 5 March, 7 March, and 9 March.

==== Mora IK vs. BIK Karlskoga ====
5 March	BIK Karlskoga	1–3	Mora IK	Nobelhallen	Recap
No scoring		First period	1:55 – Kevin Goumas 1
Carl Persson 1 – pp – 13:27		Second period	No scoring
No scoring		Third period	7:59 – pp – Kevin Goumas 2; 19:41 – pp, en – Matt Bailey 1
Andrew Engelage (34 saves / 36 shots)		Goalie stats	Christian Engstrand (23 saves / 24 shots)

7 March	Mora IK	7–3	BIK Karlskoga	Smidjegrav Arena	Recap
Pierre Engvall 1 – pp – 2:21; Kevin Goumas 3 – 9:21; Oskar Svanlund 1 – 14:22		First period	13:17 – Fredrik Höggren 1
Pierre Engvall 2 – pp – 1:54; Matt Bailey 2 – 5:41		Second period	13:40 – pp – Carl Persson 2; 13:54 – Victor Berglind 1
Emil Bejmo 1 – en – 17:20; Viktor Amnér 1 – pp2 – 19:43		Third period	No scoring
Christian Engstrand (17 saves / 20 shots)		Goalie stats	Andrew Engelage (32 saves / 38 shots)

9 March	Mora IK	4–1	BIK Karlskoga	Smidjegrav Arena	Recap
Jacob Nilsson 1 – 13:56; Emil Aronsson 1 – 14:28		First period	18:06 – Victor Ejdsell 1
Matias Lassen 1 – 11:21; Viktor Amnér 2 – pp2 – 13:27		Second period	No scoring
No scoring		Third period	No scoring
Christian Engstrand (39 saves / 40 shots)		Goalie stats	Andrew Engelage (18 saves / 22 shots); Emil Kruse (11 saves / 11 shots)

Mora IK won series 3–0

=== HockeyAllsvenskan playoffs ===
In the HockeyAllsvenskan playoffs (Swedish: Slutspelsserien), teams 3–8 met in a single-round robin tournament. Teams 3–5 had an extra game on home-ice. The matches were held on 6–14 March. Teams also started with bonus points based on their position in the regular season standings. Team 3 began with three points, team 4 with two points, and team 5 with one point.

The winner of the group advanced to the playoff to the SHL qualifiers.

Pos	Team	Pld	W	OTW	OTL	L	GF	GA	GD	Pts	Qualification
1	AIK (Q)	5	4	0	1	0	19	10	+9	14	Advance to Playoff to the SHL qualifiers
2	Västerviks IK	5	3	1	0	1	17	9	+8	14	Return to HockeyAllsvenskan for the 2017–18 season
3	IK Pantern	5	2	0	0	3	11	15	−4	8	Return to HockeyAllsvenskan for the 2017–18 season
4	Tingsryds AIF	5	2	0	0	3	9	17	−8	6	Return to HockeyAllsvenskan for the 2017–18 season
5	Timrå IK	5	1	1	0	3	18	19	−1	5	Return to HockeyAllsvenskan for the 2017–18 season
6	Almtuna IS	5	1	0	1	3	8	12	−4	4	Return to HockeyAllsvenskan for the 2017–18 season

(Q) Qualified to the phase indicated

=== Playoff to the SHL qualifiers ===
In the playoff to the SHL qualifiers (Swedish: Play Off inför direktkval till SHL), the losing team from the HockeyAllsvenskan finals met the winning team from the HockeyAllsvenskan playoffs in a best-of-three series that were played on 16 March, 18 March, and 20 March. The winning team advanced to the SHL qualifiers.

==== BIK Karlskoga vs. AIK ====
16 March	BIK Karlskoga	4–1	AIK	Nobelhallen	Recap
Carl Persson 1 – 0:54; Mikael Eriksson 1 – 2:27		First period	No scoring
Daniel Wessner 1 – 2:23		Second period	No scoring
Oliver Eklind 1 – 4:04		Third period	7:54 – Stefan Johansson 1
Emil Kruse (39 saves / 40 shots)		Goalie stats	Linus Lundin (4 saves / 7 shots); Gašper Krošelj (14 saves / 15 shots)

18 March	AIK	4–1	BIK Karlskoga	Hovet	Recap
Nicklas Heinerö 1 – pp – 3:11; Michael Lindqvist 1 – pp – 15:17		First period	No scoring
Michael Lindqvist 2 – 9:19		Second period	No scoring
Jesper Bratt 1 – 12:46		Third period	2:12 – Theodor Lennström 1
Gašper Krošelj (24 saves / 25 shots)		Goalie stats	Emil Kruse (40 saves / 44 shots)

20 March	BIK Karlskoga	3–2	2OT	AIK	Nobelhallen	Recap
No scoring		First period		No scoring
Victor Ejdsell 1 – 17:13		Second period		No scoring
Simon Mattsson 1 – 3:18		Third period		19:23 – Jonas Almtorp 1; 19:53 – Mads Larsen 1
Carl Berglund 1 – 6:59		Second overtime period		No scoring
Emil Kruse (42 saves / 44 shots)		Goalie stats		Gašper Krošelj (35 saves / 38 shots)

BIK Karlskoga won series 2–1

=== SHL qualifiers ===
In the SHL qualifiers (Swedish: Direktkval till SHL), the winners of the HockeyAllsvenskan finals and the playoff to the SHL qualifiers were paired against teams 13 and 14 from the 2016–17 SHL season. Each pair played a best-of-seven series, with the winner qualifying for play in the 2017–18 SHL season, and the loser playing in the 2017–18 HockeyAllsvenskan season. These series began on 22 and 23 March, and were completed by 1 April. Rögle won their series, 4–0, to secure continued SHL play. Mora then won their series, 4–2, to qualify for SHL play for the first time since the 2007–08 season.

==== Leksands IF vs. Mora IK ====
22 March	Leksands IF	0–2	Mora IK	Tegera Arena	Recap
No scoring		First period	11:05 – Matias Lassen 1
No scoring		Second period	No scoring
No scoring		Third period	8:34 – Pierre Engvall 1
Atte Engren (36 saves / 38 shots)		Goalie stats	Christian Engstrand (21 saves / 21 shots)

24 March	Mora IK	2–4	Leksands IF	Smidjegrav Arena	Recap
No scoring		First period	No scoring
Oskar Svanlund 1 – 6:12		Second period	4:57 – pp – Johan Porsberger 1; 12:19 – Martin Grönberg 1
Jacob Nilsson 1 – pp – 12:16		Third period	10:05 – pp – Mattias Ritola 1; 18:33 – en – Mattias Ritola 2
Christian Engstrand (21 saves / 24 shots)		Goalie stats	Atte Engren (21 saves / 23 shots)

26 March	Leksands IF	1–6	Mora IK	Tegera Arena	Recap
Johan Porsberger 2 – pp – 11:45		First period	6:32 – Matt Bailey 1
No scoring		Second period	4:22 – Kevin Goumas 1; 14:49 – sh – Matt Bailey 2
No scoring		Third period	7:41 – pp – Alexander Hilmerson 1; 14:24 – en – Kevin Goumas 2; 19:21 – sh, en – Emil Bejmo 1
Atte Engren (16 saves / 20 shots)		Goalie stats	Christian Engstrand (27 saves / 28 shots)

28 March	Mora IK	4–1	Leksands IF	Smidjegrav Arena	Recap
No scoring		First period	No scoring
Matt Bailey 3 – 4:58; Oskar Svanlund 2 – 7:39; Matt Bailey 4 – 12:54		Second period	9:22 – Johan Olofsson 1
Emil Bejmo 2 – pp – 4:29		Third period	No scoring
Christian Engstrand (34 saves / 35 shots)		Goalie stats	Atte Engren (26 saves / 30 shots)

30 March	Leksands IF	4–2	Mora IK	Tegera Arena	Recap
Jon Knuts 1 – 15:28		First period	No scoring
Éric Castonguay 1 – 4:24; Mattias Ritola 3 – 6:24		Second period	15:45 – Matt Bailey 5
Jon Knuts 2 – 2:18		Third period	14:54 – pp – Pierre Engvall 2
Henrik Haukeland (27 saves / 29 shots)		Goalie stats	Christian Engstrand (24 saves / 28 shots)

1 April	Mora IK	5–1	Leksands IF	Smidjegrav Arena	Recap
Oskar Svanlund 3 – 2:27; Alex Aleardi 1 – pp – 4:58		First period	11:44 – Oskar Lang 1
No scoring		Second period	No scoring
Kevin Goumas 3 – 0:46; Pierre Engvall 3 – en – 17:42; Robin Johansson 1 – en – 18:51		Third period	No scoring
Christian Engstrand (34 saves / 35 shots)		Goalie stats	Henrik Haukeland (26 saves / 29 shots)

Mora IK won series 4–2

==== Rögle BK vs. BIK Karlskoga ====
23 March	Rögle BK	5–2	BIK Karlskoga	Lindab Arena	Recap
No scoring		First period	5:41 – Victor Ejdsell 1; 8:10 – Victor Ejdsell 2
No scoring		Second period	No scoring
Ludvig Rensfeldt 1 – 0:39; Edwin Hedberg 1 – pp – 3:11; Felix Schütz 1 – 4:04; Simon Ryfors 1 – 7:40; Almen Bibic 1 – en – 18:28		Third period	No scoring
Anders Lindbäck (26 saves / 28 shots)		Goalie stats	Emil Kruse (37 saves / 41 shots)

25 March	BIK Karlskoga	1–2	Rögle BK	Nobelhallen	Recap
No scoring		First period	No scoring
No scoring		Second period	No scoring
Fredrik Höggren 1 – 11:00		Third period	12:31 – Edwin Hedberg 2; 14:35 – Jack Connolly 1
Emil Kruse (31 saves / 33 shots)		Goalie stats	Anders Lindbäck (23 saves / 24 shots)

27 March	Rögle BK	2–1	OT	BIK Karlskoga	Lindab Arena	Recap
No scoring		First period		1:03 – Juliuz Persson 1
No scoring		Second period		No scoring
Alen Bibic 1 – 16:30		Third period		No scoring
Edwin Hedberg 3 – 17:36		First overtime period		No scoring
Anders Lindbäck (30 saves / 31 shots)		Goalie stats		Emil Kruse (47 saves / 49 shots)

29 March	BIK Karlskoga	4–5	2OT	Rögle BK	Nobelhallen	Recap
No scoring		First period		5:56 – Edwin Hedberg 4
Alexandre Lavoie 1 – pp2 – 0:46		Second period		3:24 – Dominik Graňák 1
Juliuz Persson 2 – 12:00; Simon Mattsson 1 – 17:59; Theodor Lännström 1 – 19:43		Third period		0:49 – Sebastian Collberg 1; 17:34 – en – Daniel Sylvander 1
No scoring		Second overtime period		14:20 – Felix Schütz 2
Emil Kruse (47 saves / 51 shots)		Goalie stats		Anders Lindbäck (36 saves / 40 shots)

Rögle BK won series 4–0

== HockeyAllsvenskan qualifiers ==
Västerås and Södertälje, teams 13 and 14 from the regular season, were forced to defend their spots in HockeyAllsvenskan in the HockeyAllsvenskan qualifiers (Swedish: Kvalserien till HockeyAllsvenskan). Joining the two HockeyAllsvenskan teams were four challengers from third-tier league Hockeyettan, the winner of the Hockeyettan Finals (Huddinge IK) and the three surviving teams from the Hockeyettan playoffs.

Pos	Team	Pld	W	OTW	OTL	L	GF	GA	GD	Pts	Qualification
1	Södertälje SK	10	6	1	2	1	31	23	+8	22	Qualify for the 2017–18 HockeyAllsvenskan season
2	IF Troja/Ljungby (P)	10	7	0	0	3	28	20	+8	21	Qualify for the 2017–18 HockeyAllsvenskan season
3	Kristianstads IK	10	5	1	1	3	31	23	+8	18	Qualify for the 2017–18 Hockeyettan season
4	VIK Västerås HK (R)	10	3	3	0	4	23	28	−5	15	Qualify for the 2017–18 Hockeyettan season
5	Huddinge IK	10	3	0	2	5	31	32	−1	11	Qualify for the 2017–18 Hockeyettan season
6	Visby/Roma HK	10	1	0	0	9	21	39	−18	3	Qualify for the 2017–18 Hockeyettan season

(P) Promoted; (R) Relegated
