= 2015–16 HockeyAllsvenskan season =

- League: HockeyAllsvenskan
- Sport: Ice hockey
- Duration: September 11, 2015 – February 28, 2016 (regular season)
- Number of teams: 14
- TV partner(s): TV4 Group
- First place: AIK
- Top scorer: Marcus Nilsson (BIK)
- Promoted to SHL: Leksands IF
- Relegated to Hockeyettan: Asplöven HC; IF Sundsvall

HockeyAllsvenskan seasons
- ← 2014–15 2016–17 →

The 2015–16 HockeyAllsvenskan season was the 11th season since the second tier of ice hockey in Sweden was renamed. The league features 14 teams, each playing each other four times, for a total of 52 regular season games. The season began on 11 September 2015 and the regular season ended on 28 February 2016, followed by promotion and relegation tournaments until 2 April.

== Participating teams ==
HockeyAllsvenskan team map

Team	City	Arena	Capacity
AIK	Stockholm	Hovet	8,094
Almtuna IS	Uppsala	Metallåtervinning Arena	2,800
Asplöven HC	Haparanda	Arena Polarica	1,500
IF Björklöven	Umeå	T3 Center	5,400
BIK Karlskoga	Karlskoga	Nobelhallen	6,300
Leksands IF	Leksand	Tegera Arena	7,650
Mora IK	Mora	FM Mattsson Arena	4,514
IK Oskarshamn	Oskarshamn	Arena Oskarshamn	3,346
IK Pantern	Malmö	Malmö Isstadion	5,800
IF Sundsvall Hockey	Sundsvall	Gärdehov	2,500
Timrå IK	Timrå	E.ON Arena	6,000
Tingsryds AIF	Tingsryd	Nelson Garden Arena	3,400
VIK Västerås HK	Västerås	ABB Arena Nord	4,902
HC Vita Hästen	Norrköping	Himmelstalundshallen	4,280

== Regular season ==
=== Standings ===
Pos	Team	Pld	W	OTW	OTL	L	GF	GA	GD	Pts	Qualification or relegation
1	AIK	52	28	9	3	12	176	125	+51	105	Advance to the HockeyAllsvenskan finals
2	Tingsryds AIF	52	26	9	5	12	141	111	+30	101	Advance to the HockeyAllsvenskan finals
3	IK Oskarshamn	52	26	4	6	16	134	129	+5	92	Advance to the HockeyAllsvenskan playoffs
4	Leksands IF	52	24	3	7	18	152	145	+7	85	Advance to the HockeyAllsvenskan playoffs
5	BIK Karlskoga	52	20	8	7	17	171	154	+17	83	Advance to the HockeyAllsvenskan playoffs
6	Mora IK	52	20	6	6	20	143	132	+11	78	Advance to the HockeyAllsvenskan playoffs
7	Almtuna IS	52	18	8	8	18	143	143	0	78	Advance to the HockeyAllsvenskan playoffs
8	Timrå IK	52	19	8	4	21	120	120	0	77	Advance to the HockeyAllsvenskan playoffs
9	VIK Västerås HK	52	20	3	9	20	147	148	−1	75	
10	IK Pantern	52	21	2	6	23	119	117	+2	73	
11	HC Vita Hästen	52	15	10	7	20	126	129	−3	72	
12	IF Björklöven	52	20	2	8	22	141	160	−19	72	
13	Asplöven HC	52	13	7	6	26	135	165	−30	59	Advance to the HockeyAllsvenskan qualifiers
14	IF Sundsvall	52	8	7	4	33	106	176	−70	42	Advance to the HockeyAllsvenskan qualifiers

== Post-season ==
=== Finals ===
In the HockeyAllsvenskan finals (Swedish: HockeyAllsvenska finalen), the first and second place teams from the regular season will meet in a best-of-five series, where the winner will advance to the SHL qualifiers, and the losing team will continue to a playoff to the SHL qualifiers. The matches were held on 1 March, 3 March, 5 March, and then 7 March and 9 March.

==== AIK vs. Tingsryd AIF ====
1 March	Tingsryds AIF	3–0	AIK	Nelson Garden Arena	Recap
No scoring		First period	No scoring
Kari Sihvonen 1 - 7:16		Second period	No scoring
Emil Forslund 1 - sh - 12:45; Niklas Enberg 1 - en - 19:03		Third period	No scoring
Johannes Jönsson (28 saves / 28 shots)		Goalie stats	Gustaf Lindvall (18 saves / 20 shots)

3 March	AIK	3–0	Tingsryds AIF	Hovet	Recap
Jonas Almtorp 1 - 7:48		First period	No scoring
Jonathan Andersson 1 - 16:48		Second period	No scoring
Tobias Ericsson 1 - 5:23		Third period	No scoring
Gustaf Lindvall (26 saves / 26 shots)		Goalie stats	Johannes Jönsson (27 saves / 30 shots)

5 March	AIK	2–1	Tingsryds AIF	Hovet	Recap
Jesper Frödén 1 - 7:46		First period	No scoring
No scoring		Second period	11:33 - pp - Éric Castonguay 1
Emil Lundberg 1 - sh2 - 0:24		Third period	No scoring
Gustaf Lindvall (30 saves / 31 shots)		Goalie stats	Johannes Jönsson (43 saves / 45 shots)

7 March	Tingsryds AIF	3–2	AIK	Nelson Garden Arena	Recap
Joakim Högberg 1 - pp - 0:22; Emil Forslund 2 - 0:54		First period	16:02 - Christian Sandberg 1; 18:08 - Daniel Olsson-Trkulja 1
Markus Persson 1 - 6:04		Second period	No scoring
No scoring		Third period	No scoring
Johannes Jönsson (33 saves / 35 shots)		Goalie stats	Gustaf Lindvall (1 save / 3 shots); Robin Rahm (20 saves / 21 shots)

9 March	AIK	4–3	OT	Tingsryds AIF	Hovet	Recap
No scoring		First period		No scoring
Jonas Almtorp 2 - 9:28; Jonathan Andersson 2 - pp - 18:01; Christian Sandberg 2 - pp - 18:33		Second period		13:19 - pp - Kari Sihvonen 2; 15:09 - Éric Castonguay 2
No scoring		Third period		13:28 - pp - Filip Owesson 1
Robin Kovacs 1 - 1:28		First overtime period		No scoring
Gustaf Lindvall (35 saves / 38 shots)		Goalie stats		Johannes Jönsson (34 saves / 38 shots)

AIK won series 3–2

=== HockeyAllsvenskan playoffs ===
In the HockeyAllsvenskan playoffs (Swedish: slutspelsserien), teams 3–8 meet in a single-round robin tournament. Teams 3–5 will have an extra game on home-ice. The matches will be held on 2–10 March. Teams will also start with bonus points based on their position in the regular season standings. Team 3 will begin with three points, team 4 with two points, and team 5 with one point.

The winner of the group advances to the playoff to the SHL qualifiers.

Pos	Team	Pld	W	OTW	OTL	L	GF	GA	GD	Pts	Qualification
1	Leksands IF (Q)	5	3	0	0	2	18	11	+7	11	Advance to Playoff to the SHL qualifiers
2	Mora IK	5	3	1	0	1	12	10	+2	11	Return to HockeyAllsvenskan for the 2016–17 season
3	BIK Karlskoga	5	3	0	0	2	17	12	+5	10	Return to HockeyAllsvenskan for the 2016–17 season
4	IK Oskarshamn	5	2	0	1	2	12	16	−4	10	Return to HockeyAllsvenskan for the 2016–17 season
5	Timrå IK	5	2	0	0	3	12	15	−3	6	Return to HockeyAllsvenskan for the 2016–17 season
6	Almtuna IS	5	1	0	0	4	10	17	−7	3	Return to HockeyAllsvenskan for the 2016–17 season

(Q) Qualified to the phase indicated

=== Playoff to the SHL qualifiers ===
In the playoff to the SHL qualifiers (Swedish: Play Off inför direktkval till SHL), the losing team from the HockeyAllsvenskan finals meets the winning team from the HockeyAllsvenskan playoffs in a best-of-three series that were played 12 March and 15 March. The winning team advances to the SHL qualifiers.

==== Tingsryd AIF vs. Leksands IF ====
12 March	Tingsryd AIF	2–3	Leksands IF	Nelson Garden Arena	Recap
No scoring		First period	18:41 - Anton Karlsson 1
Niklas Enberg 1 - 11:31		Second period	No scoring
Kevin Ekman-Larsson 1 - 01:24		Third period	07:12 - János Hári 1; 11:49 - Johan Olofsson 1
Wictor Ragnewall (25 saves / 28 shots)		Goalie stats	Henrik Haukeland (30 saves / 32 shots)

15 March	Leksands IF	4–2	Tingsryd AIF	Tegera Arena	Recap
Johan Porsberger 1 - 02:46; Johan Olofsson 2 - 03:25		First period	08:50 - pp - Éric Castonguay 1
Jon Knuts 1 - 01:22		Second period	13:05 - Markus Persson 1
Martin Karlsson 1 - 03:18		Third period	No scoring
Henrik Haukeland (35 saves / 37 shots)		Goalie stats	Johannes Jönsson (27 saves / 31 shots)

Leksands IF won series 2–0

=== SHL qualifiers ===
In the SHL qualifiers (Swedish: Direktkval till SHL), the winners of the HockeyAllsvenskan finals and the playoff to the SHL qualifiers are paired against teams 13 and 14 from the 2015–16 SHL season. Each pair plays a best-of-seven series, with the winner qualifying for play in the 2016–17 SHL season, and the loser playing in the 2016–17 HockeyAllsvenskan season. These series began on 19 and 20 March, and will be completed by 1 April at the latest. Karlskrona HK was the first team to win their series, 4 games to 1, to qualify for their second season in the SHL. Leksands IF would then win their series, 4 games to 3, to get promoted to the SHL.

==== Karlskrona HK vs. AIK ====
19 March	Karlskrona HK	3–2	3OT	AIK	Telenor Arena Karlskrona	Recap
Mattias Guter 1 - pp - 08:59		First period		17:52 - pp - Malte Strömwall 1
No scoring		Second period		03:29 - Christian Sandberg 1
Jimmy Andersson 1 - 00:45		Third period		No scoring
Vyacheslav Trukhno 1 - 10:55		Third overtime period		No scoring
Johan Holmqvist (44 saves / 46 shots)		Goalie stats		Gustaf Lindvall (57 saves / 59 shots); Robin Rahm (2 saves / 3 shots)

21 March	AIK	2–1	Karlskrona HK	Hovet	Recap
No scoring		First period	No scoring
Michael Lindqvist 1 - pp - 00:45; Marcus Jonsson 1 - 17:10		Second period	No scoring
No scoring		Third period	12:23 - Alexander Bergström 1
Robin Rahm (17 saves / 18 shots)		Goalie stats	Johan Holmqvist (34 saves / 36 shots)

23 March	Karlskrona HK	3–2	AIK	Telenor Arena Karlskrona	Recap
No scoring		First period	No scoring
Mattias Guter 2 - 16:44; Vyacheslav Trukhno 2 - 18:15		Second period	02:24 - Michael Lindqvist 2
Mattias Guter 3 - 17:23		Third period	13:00 - pp - Daniel Olsson-Trkulja 1
Johan Holmqvist (38 saves / 40 shots)		Goalie stats	Robin Rahm (18 saves / 21 shots)

25 March	AIK	0–2	Karlskrona HK	Hovet	Recap
No scoring		First period	17:46 - Jimmy Andersson 2
No scoring		Second period	17:09 - Alexander Viklund 1
No scoring		Third period	No scoring
Robin Rahm (22 saves / 24 shots)		Goalie stats	Johan Holmqvist (29 saves / 29 shots)

27 March	Karlskrona HK	4–1	AIK	Telenor Arena Karlskrona	Recap
No scoring		First period	No scoring
Alexander Bergström 2 - pp - 05:40		Second period	No scoring
Jimmy Andersson 3 - 02:03; Riley Holzapfel 1 - 06:17; Mattias Guter 4 - en - 16:57		Third period	18:56 - Jesper Frödén 1
Johan Holmqvist (25 saves / 26 shots)		Goalie stats	Robin Rahm (28 saves / 31 shots)

Karlskrona HK won series 4–1

==== Modo Hockey vs. Leksands IF ====
20 March	Modo Hockey	5–0	Leksands IF	Fjällräven Center	Recap
Victor Olofsson 1 - 11:30; Emil Pettersson 1 - 14:37		First period	No scoring
Ludvig Nilsson 1 - 12:24; Victor Olofsson 2 - 19:59		Second period	No scoring
Gustav Possler 1 - pp - 06:56		Third period	No scoring
Adam Reideborn (26 saves / 26 shots)		Goalie stats	Henrik Haukeland (22 saves / 26 shots); Frans Tuohimaa (4 saves / 5 shots)

22 March	Leksands IF	0–4	Modo Hockey	Tegera Arena	Recap
No scoring		First period	04:57 - Emil Pettersson 2; 11:04 - pp - Per-Åge Skrøder 1
No scoring		Second period	No scoring
No scoring		Third period	11:14 - Victor Olofsson 3; 18:03 - en - Patrick Dwyer 1
Frans Tuohimaa (21 saves / 24 shots)		Goalie stats	Adam Reideborn (32 saves / 32 shots)

24 March	Modo Hockey	1–2	OT	Leksands IF	Fjällräven Center	Recap
No scoring		First period		No scoring
Victor Olofsson 4 - 16:25		Second period		02:54 - pp - Alexander Ytterell 1
No scoring		Third period		No scoring
No scoring		First overtime period		01:09 - Martin Grönberg 1
Adam Reideborn (20 saves / 22 shots)		Goalie stats		Henrik Haukeland (32 saves / 33 shots)

26 March	Leksands IF	2–1	Modo Hockey	Tegera Arena	Recap
Brock Montpetit 1 - 00:59		First period	No scoring
No scoring		Second period	No scoring
Jon Knuts 1 - 04:18		Third period	11:28 - pp - Per-Åge Skrøder 2
Henrik Haukeland (29 saves / 30 shots)		Goalie stats	Adam Reideborn (11 saves / 13 shots)

28 March	Modo Hockey	7–1	Leksands IF	Fjällräven Center	Recap
Bobby Butler 1 - pp - 07:20; Otso Rantakari 1 - 13:04; Ilari Filppula 1 - 15:09		First period	13:19 - Viktor Amnér 1
Carl Grundström 1 - 04:00; Bill Thomas 1 - 04:19; Emil Pettersson 3 - 15:10		Second period	No scoring
Bill Thomas 2 - 13:10		Third period	No scoring
Adam Reideborn (30 saves / 31 shots)		Goalie stats	Henrik Haukeland (12 saves / 16 shots); Frans Tuohimaa (16 saves / 19 shots)

30 March	Leksands IF	5–4	Modo Hockey	Tegera Arena	Recap
Johan Porsberger 1 - 11:04		First period	07:12 - Bill Thomas 3
Tommi Paakkolanvaara 1 - pp - 01:51; Alexander Ytterell 2 - 08:11		Second period	17:58 - Per-Åge Skrøder 3; 19:50 - Oscar Hedman 1
Alexander Ytterell 3 - pp - 03:41; Jon Knuts 2 - 11:44		Third period	08:00 - Ilari Filppula 2
Henrik Haukeland (29 saves / 33 shots)		Goalie stats	Adam Reideborn (22 saves / 27 shots)

1 April	Modo Hockey	3−4	OT	Leksands IF	Fjällräven Center	Recap
Nichlas Torp 1 - 18:12		First period		13:02 - pp - Jon Knuts 3
Victor Olofsson 5 - 04:58; Victor Olofsson 6 - 18:00		Second period		No scoring
No scoring		Third period		12:02 - Jon Knuts 4; 19:08 - Alexander Ytterell 4
No scoring		First overtime period		15:52 - Brock Monpetit 2
Adam Reideborn (14 saves / 18 shots)		Goalie stats		Henrik Haukeland (47 saves / 50 shots)

Leksands IF won series 4–3

== HockeyAllsvenskan qualifiers ==
Asplöven and Sundsvall, teams 13 and 14 from the regular season, will be forced to defend their spots in HockeyAllsvenskan in the HockeyAllsvenskan qualifiers (Swedish: Kvalserien till HockeyAllsvenskan). Joining the two HockeyAllsvenskan teams will be four challengers from third-tier league Hockeyettan, the winner of AllEttan North (Borlänge HF), the winner of AllEttan South (Västerviks IK), and the two surviving teams from the Hockeyettan playoffs (IF Troja/Ljungby and Södertälje SK).

These six teams will play a double round robin tournament from 10 March to 2 April. Teams 1 and 2 from this tournament are qualified for the 2016–17 HockeyAllsvenskan season, while teams 3–6 will play in the 2016–17 Hockeyettan season.

Pos	Team	Pld	W	OTW	OTL	L	GF	GA	GD	Pts	Qualification
1	Södertälje SK (P)	10	6	2	0	2	39	24	+15	22	Qualify for the 2016–17 HockeyAllsvenskan season
2	Västerviks IK (P)	10	6	1	2	1	34	23	+11	22	Qualify for the 2016–17 HockeyAllsvenskan season
3	IF Troja/Ljungby	10	4	1	1	4	38	30	+8	15	Qualify for the 2016–17 Hockeyettan season
4	IF Sundsvall (R)	10	3	1	2	4	23	29	−6	13	Qualify for the 2016–17 Hockeyettan season
5	Asplöven HC (R)	10	3	1	1	5	35	35	0	12	Qualify for the 2016–17 Hockeyettan season
6	Borlänge HF	10	2	0	0	8	20	48	−28	6	Qualify for the 2016–17 Hockeyettan season

(P) Promoted; (R) Relegated
