= Mikael Eriksson =

Mikael Eriksson may refer to:

- Mikael Eriksson (footballer)
- Mikael Eriksson (ice hockey)

== See also ==
- Mikael Ericsson, Swedish rally driver
