= Riikola =

Surname list

Riikola is a Finnish surname. Notable people with the surname include:

- Juuso Riikola (born 1993), Finnish ice hockey player
- Simo-Pekka Riikola (born 1992), Finnish ice hockey player
