= 2018 Sweden Hockey Games =

2018 Sweden Hockey Games (Euro Hockey Tour)
Tournament details
- Host countries: Sweden; Finland
- Cities: Stockholm; Södertälje; Helsinki
- Venues: 3 (in 3 host cities)
- Dates: 26–29 April 2018
- Teams: 4

Final positions
- Champions: Finland (7th title)
- Runners-up: Sweden
- Third place: Russia
- Fourth place: Czech Republic

Tournament statistics
- Games played: 6
- Goals scored: 30 (5 per game)
- Attendance: 26,270 (4,378 per game)
- Scoring leader(s): (Finland) Veli-Matti Savinainen (Russia) Pavel Buchnevich (3 points)

Official website
- swehockey

The 2018 Sweden Hockey Games was played between 26 and 29 April 2018. The Czech Republic, Finland, Sweden and Russia played a round-robin for a total of three games per team and six games in total. Three of the matches were played in Stockholm, Sweden, two matches in Södertälje, Sweden and one match in Helsinki, Finland. Finland won the tournament. The tournament was part of 2017–18 Euro Hockey Tour.

== Standings ==
Pos	Team	Pld	W	OTW	OTL	L	GF	GA	GD	Pts
1	Finland	3	2	1	0	0	11	5	+6	8
2	Sweden	3	2	0	0	1	7	5	+2	6
3	Russia	3	1	0	1	1	7	8	−1	4
4	Czech Republic	3	0	0	0	3	5	12	−7	0

Source: swehockey

== Games ==
All times are local. Södertälje and Stockholm – (Central European Summer Time – UTC+2) Helsinki – (Eastern European Summer Time - UTC+3)

26 April 2018; 18:30	Finland	3–2 GWS (0–1,1–0,1–1) (OT: 0–0) (SO: 1–0)	Russia	Hartwall Arena, Helsinki; Attendance: 5,439

Game reference

Ville Husso
Goalies
Igor Shestyorkin
Referees:
(Czech Republic) Vladimir Pesina
(Czech Republic) Robin Sir
Linesmen:
(Finland) Henri Neva
(Finland) Hannu Sormunen

	0–1	07:42 – Galiev (Buchnevich)
Puustinen (Pokka, Savinainen) (PP) – 28:34	1–1
Rajala (Savinainen, Jokiharju) – 45:42	2–1
	2–2	55:44 – Kablukov (Mamin, Bereglazov)

Rajala (miss)
Puustinen
Savinainen
Palola (miss)
Shootout
(miss) Kablukov
(miss) Buchnevich
(miss) Dadonov
(miss) Kruchinin
6 min
Penalties
12 min
26
Shots
17

26 April 2018; 19:00	Czech Republic	1–3 (0–1, 0–2, 1–0)	Sweden	Scaniarinken, Södertälje; Attendance: 4,707

Game reference

David Rittich
Goalies
Anders Nilsson
Referees:
(Finland) Anssi Salonen
(Finland) Jari-Pekka Pajula
Linesmen:
(Sweden) Daniel Persson
(Sweden) Emil Wernström

	0–1	15:19 – Nilsson (Backlund, Brännström)
	0–2	33:30 – Zibanejad (Janmark-Nylén, Wikstrand) (SH)
	0–3	35:25 – Ekman-Larsson (Andersson, Larsson)
Sklenička (Červenka, Hanzl) – 50:51	1–3

10 min
Penalties
10 min
19
Shots
33

28 April 2018; 12:00	Finland	5–2 (2–0, 0–1, 3–1)	Czech Republic	Scaniarinken, Södertälje; Attendance: 1,577

Game reference

Ville Husso
Goalies
Dominik Furch
Referees:
(Sweden) Tobias Björk
(Sweden) Mikael Holm
Linesmen:
(Sweden) David Laksola
(Sweden) Anders Nyqvist

Honka (Ikonen) (PP) – 13:37	1–0
Suomela (Riikola) (PP) – 16:33	2–0
	2–1	30:15 – Musil
Kiiskinen (Pesonen, Ikonen) – 40:53	3–1
Rajala (Sandell, Riikola) (PP2) – 51:15	4–1
Kivistö (Manninen) (PP) – 51:40	5–1
	5–2	55:26 – Kousal (Stransky) (PP)

10 min
Penalties
26 min
27
Shots
21

28 April 2018; 15:30	Sweden	3–1 (1–0, 2–0, 0–1)	Russia	Hovet, Stockholm; Attendance: 5,696

Game reference

Magnus Hellberg
Goalies
Vasily Koshechkin
Referees:
(Finland) Anssi Salonen
(Finland) Jari-Pekka Pajula
Linesmen:
(Sweden) Daniel Persson
(Sweden) Andreas Malmqvist

Norman (Janmark) – 17:31	1–0
Pilut (Kempe) – 33:02	2–0
Nilsson – 34:14	3–0
	3–1	53:37 – Byvaltsev (Kablukov)

8 min
Penalties
16 min
27
Shots
24

29 April 2018; 12:00	Russia	4–2 (2–1, 1–1, 1–0)	Czech Republic	Hovet, Stockholm; Attendance: 2,101

Game reference

Igor Shestyorkin
Goalies
Pavel Francouz
Referees:
(Sweden) Tobias Björk
(Sweden) Mikael Holm
Linesmen:
(Sweden) David Laksola
(Sweden) Anders Nyqvist

	0–1	08:44 – Jaškin (Chytil) (PP)
Dadonov (Anisimov) – 09:14	1–1
Buchnevich (Tkachyov) – 12:54	2–1
	2–2	33:02 – Chytil (Jaškin, Nestrašil) (PP)
Tkachyov (Buchnevich) – 37:28	3–2
Soshnikov (EN) – 58:20	4–2

10 min
Penalties
6 min
31
Shots
24

29 April 2018; 15:30	Sweden	1–3 (0–0, 1–0, 0–3)	Finland	Hovet, Stockholm; Attendance: 6,750

Game reference

Anders Nilsson
Goalies
Harri Säteri
Referees:
(Russia) Roman Gofman
(Russia) Konstantin Olenin
Linesmen:
(Sweden) Daniel Persson
(Sweden) Andreas Malmqvist

Ekman-Larsson (Klingberg) (PP) – 29:07	1–0
	1–1	41:42 – Riikola (Ikonen) (PP)
	1–2	43:42 – Savinainen (Teräväinen)
	1–3	59:41 – Aho (Anttila) (EN)

20 min
Penalties
10 min
27
Shots
24

== Scoring leaders ==
Pos	Player	Country	GP	G	A	Pts	+/−	PIM	POS
1	Veli-Matti Savinainen	Finland	3	1	2	3	+3	0	CE
2	Pavel Buchnevich	Russia	3	1	2	3	+4	0	RW
3	Juuso Riikola	Finland	3	0	3	3	+3	2	LD
4	Juuso Ikonen	Finland	3	0	3	3	+1	0	CE
5	Juuso Puustinen	Finland	3	2	0	2	-1	0	RW

GP = Games played; G = Goals; A = Assists; Pts = Points; +/− = Plus/minus; PIM = Penalties in minutes; POS = Position
Source: swehockey

== Goaltending leaders ==
Pos	Player	Country	TOI	GA	GAA	Sv%	SO
1	Anders Nilsson	Sweden	118:56	3	1.51	92.86	0
2	Igor Shesterkin	Russia	125:00	4	1.92	91.84	0
3	Ville Husso	Finland	133:48	4	1.92	89.47	0

TOI = Time on ice (minutes:seconds); SA = Shots against; GA = Goals against; GAA = Goals Against Average; Sv% = Save percentage; SO = Shutouts
Source: swehockey
