= Carl Persson (ice hockey) =

Swedish ice hockey player

- Born: 28 June 1995 (age 31) Kristianstad, Sweden
- Height: 185 cm (6 ft 1 in)
- Weight: 93 kg (205 lb; 14 st 9 lb)
- Position: Forward
- Shoots: Left
- SHL team Former teams: Malmö Redhawks; HV71; Karlskrona HK
- NHL draft: Undrafted
- Playing career: 2014–present

Carl Persson (born 28 June 1995) is a Swedish professional ice hockey forward who plays for Malmö Redhawks of the Swedish Hockey League (SHL). He began playing at Kristianstad and later played at the junior level with Tingsryds AIF. Undrafted, he made his SHL debut with HV71 in the 2014–15 season and then spent two seasons in HockeyAllsvenskan with BIK Karlskoga, before returning to the SHL with Karlskrona HK in 2017.

After Karlskrona were relegated in 2018, he signed with the Nashville Predators and was assigned to the Atlanta Gladiators of the ECHL; he left the organisation after six games and joined Malmö in November 2018.

He has remained with the Redhawks since, playing his eighth season with the club in 2026–27. In the 2025–26 season he set career highs in the SHL with 23 goals and 41 points in 49 regular-season games. In September 2024 he signed a two-year extension with Malmö through 2027.

== Playing career ==
Undrafted, Persson played as a youth with Tingsryds AIF at the J20 SuperElit level. Persson made his Swedish Hockey League debut playing with HV71 during the 2014–15 SHL season.

After two seasons in the HockeyAllsvenskan with BIK Karlskoga, Persson returned to the SHL in signing a two-year contract with Karlskrona HK on 30 March 2017. In the 2017–18 season, Persson finished third on Karlskrona with 24 points in 52 games in his first full season in the SHL.

Unable to prevent Karlskrona HK from relegation to the HockeyAllsvenksan, Persson invoked an NHL release clause, in signing a two-year, entry-level contract with the Nashville Predators on 9 May 2018. After attending the Predators training camp, Persson found himself beginning the 2018–19 season with the Predators secondary affiliate, the Atlanta Gladiators of the ECHL. After contributing 3 points in 6 games and unable to progress to the AHL, Persson agreed to a mutual termination of his contract with the Predators, immediately returning to sign a two-year contract with the Malmö Redhawks of the SHL on 9 November 2018.

== Career statistics ==
			Regular season					Playoffs
Season	Team	League	GP	G	A	Pts	PIM	GP	G	A	Pts	PIM
2011–12	Tingsryds AIF	J20	4	0	0	0	2	—	—	—	—	—
2012–13	Tingsryds AIF	J20	25	4	8	12	8	2	0	1	1	2
2013–14	Tingsryds AIF	J20	42	15	10	25	44	—	—	—	—	—
2013–14	Tingsryds AIF	Div.1	21	1	3	4	2	3	0	0	0	0
2014–15	HV71	J20	41	8	6	14	20	3	0	1	1	0
2014–15	HV71	SHL	4	0	1	1	0	6	0	0	0	0
2014–15	HC Dalen	Div.1	5	2	1	3	0	—	—	—	—	—
2015–16	BIK Karlskoga	Allsv	29	5	2	7	6	5	1	0	1	0
2015–16	Kristianstads IK	Div.1	12	8	8	16	4	—	—	—	—	—
2016–17	BIK Karlskoga	Allsv	51	26	18	44	20	10	3	3	6	6
2017–18	Karlskrona HK	SHL	52	13	11	24	22	—	—	—	—	—
2018–19	Atlanta Gladiators	ECHL	6	1	2	3	0	—	—	—	—	—
2018–19	Malmö Redhawks	SHL	35	1	6	7	10	5	1	0	1	2
2019–20	Malmö Redhawks	SHL	51	8	5	13	45	—	—	—	—	—
2020–21	Malmö Redhawks	SHL	42	8	12	20	20	2	1	1	2	0
2021–22	Malmö Redhawks	SHL	52	11	14	25	10	—	—	—	—	—
2022–23	Malmö Redhawks	SHL	52	13	13	26	24	—	—	—	—	—
2023–24	Malmö Redhawks	SHL	51	15	17	32	14	—	—	—	—	—
2024–25	Malmö Redhawks	SHL	52	13	12	25	14	8	2	1	3	6
SHL totals			391	82	91	173	159	21	4	2	6	8
