= Jacob Nilsson =

Swedish ice hockey player (born 1993)

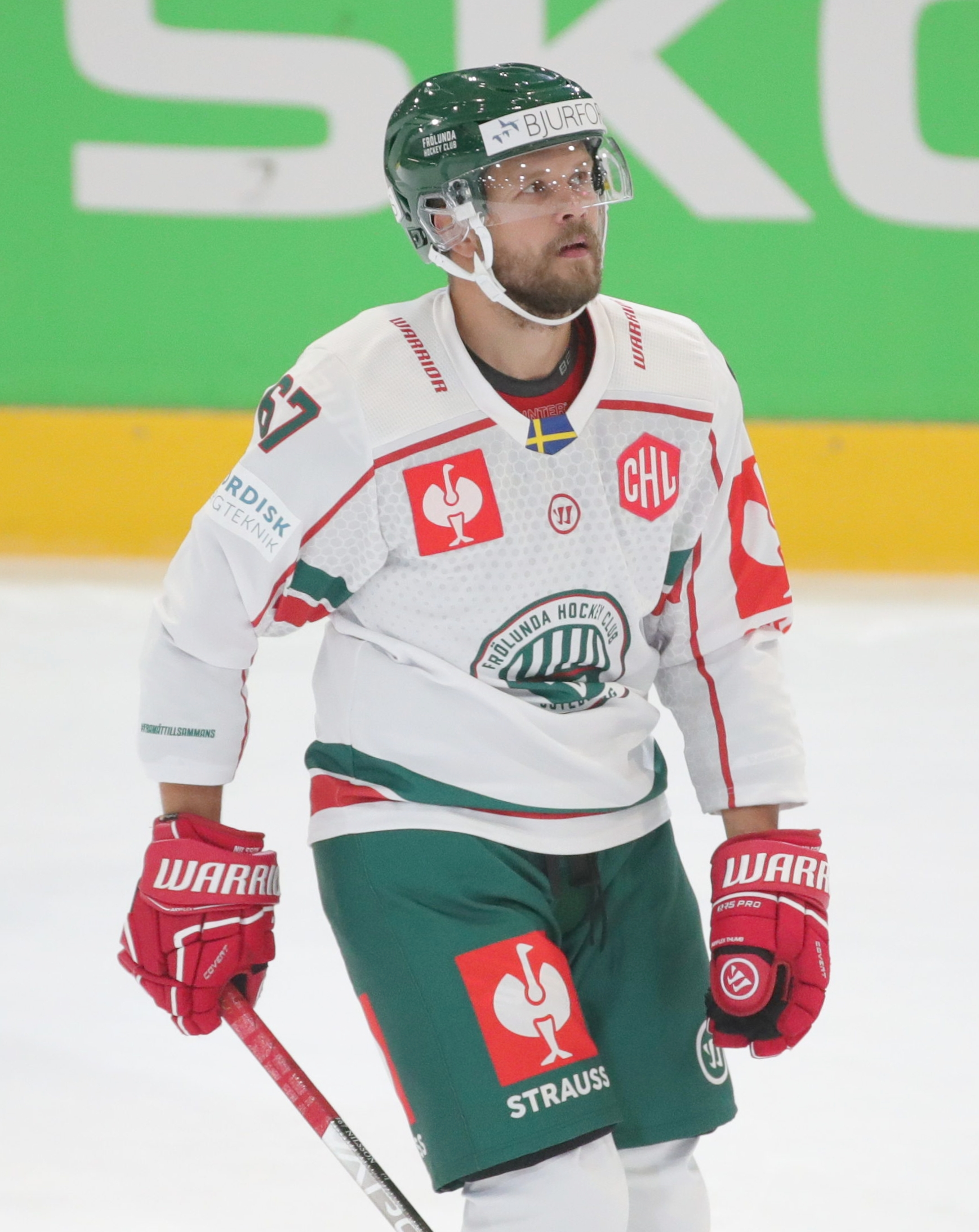
- Born: 12 October 1993 (age 32) Sölvesborg, Sweden
- Height: 5 ft 10 in (178 cm)
- Weight: 180 lb (82 kg; 12 st 12 lb)
- Position: Centre
- Shoots: Left
- SL team Former teams: EHC Visp; Mora IK; Chicago Blackhawks; Färjestad BK; Frölunda HC
- NHL draft: Undrafted
- Playing career: 2012–present

Jacob Nilsson (born 12 October 1993) is a Swedish professional ice hockey centre currently playing for EHC Visp in the Swiss League (SL) in Switzerland.

== Playing career ==
Nilsson made his Swedish Hockey League (SHL) debut during the 2017–18 season, playing in 40 games for Mora IK. He made his SHL debut and recorded his first SHL goal on 19 October 2017 against Frölunda HC. On 25 February, Nilsson was fined 13,000 Swedish krona and suspended three games due to an altercation with Rögle BK player Linus Sandin. On 23 April, Nilsson was named to Sweden's National Team to compete at the 2018 Sweden Hockey Games, but was not selected for the 2018 IIHF World Championship. However, due to his success in the SHL and with the Swedish national team, Nilsson created interest from both the National Hockey League in North America and the Kontinental Hockey League.

On 31 May 2018, as a free agent, the Chicago Blackhawks of the National Hockey League signed Nilsson to a one-year contract. Nilsson then moved to North America to join the Blackhawks organization. While attending the Blackhawks training camp, Nilsson was assigned to their American Hockey League affiliate, the Rockford IceHogs, on 21 September. After playing 31 games for the IceHogs, and earning 14 points, Nilsson was called up to the NHL for the first time on 22 December. He made his NHL debut the following day in a 6–3 loss to the Florida Panthers.

On 19 April 2019, the Blackhawks signed Nilsson to a one-year contract extension. He was subsequently assigned to the Rockford IceHogs and named an assistant captain alongside Matthew Highmore and Tyler Sikura. In the 2019–20 season, Nilsson compiled 7 goals and 21 points in 62 regular season contests before the season was cancelled due to COVID-19.

As an impending restricted free agent with the Blackhawks, Nilsson opted to return to Sweden in agreeing to a two-year contract with Färjestad BK of the SHL on 26 April 2020.

== Career statistics ==
			Regular season					Playoffs
Season	Team	League	GP	G	A	Pts	PIM	GP	G	A	Pts	PIM
2009–10	Tingsryds AIF	J20	4	0	0	0	0	—	—	—	—	—
2010–11	Tingsryds AIF	J20	41	11	9	20	22	—	—	—	—	—
2011–12	Tingsryds AIF	J20	30	4	11	15	28	—	—	—	—	—
2011–12	Tingsryds AIF	Allsv	11	0	1	1	0	—	—	—	—	—
2012–13	Tingsryds AIF	J20	1	0	0	0	0	—	—	—	—	—
2012–13	Tingsryds AIF	Allsv	50	4	3	7	24	—	—	—	—	—
2013–14	Tingsryds AIF	Div.1	38	4	19	23	34	17	2	4	6	8
2014–15	Tingsryds AIF	Div.1	32	4	24	28	49	16	3	7	10	10
2015–16	Mora IK	Allsv	47	9	10	19	20	3	1	0	1	2
2016–17	Mora IK	Allsv	46	20	22	42	65	6	2	3	5	25
2017–18	Mora IK	SHL	40	8	10	18	14	—	—	—	—	—
2018–19	Rockford IceHogs	AHL	61	15	17	32	22	—	—	—	—	—
2018–19	Chicago Blackhawks	NHL	2	0	0	0	0	—	—	—	—	—
2019–20	Rockford IceHogs	AHL	62	7	14	21	26	—	—	—	—	—
2020–21	Färjestad BK	SHL	50	13	10	23	20	6	0	1	1	0
2021–22	Frölunda HC	SHL	5	3	1	4	0	1	0	0	0	0
2022–23	Frölunda HC	SHL	42	8	12	20	16	11	2	1	3	0
2023–24	EHC Visp	SL	45	12	24	36	18	8	1	2	3	0
SHL totals			137	32	33	65	50	18	2	2	4	0
NHL totals			2	0	0	0	0	—	—	—	—	—
