= Jonathan Andersson =

Swedish ice hockey player

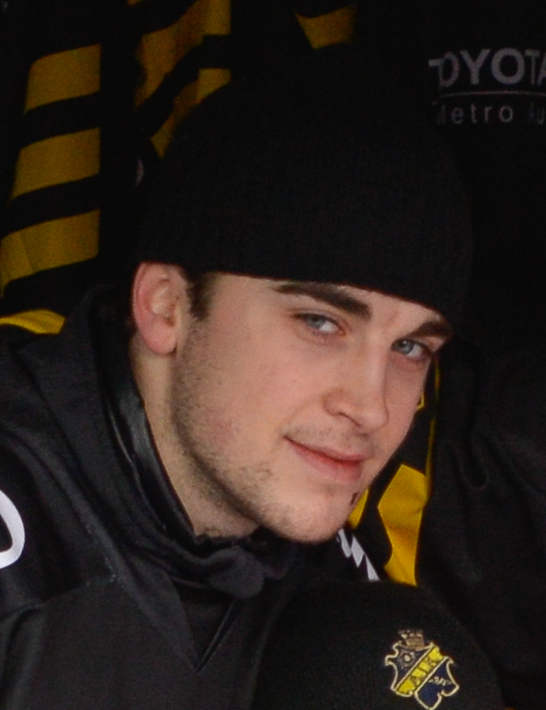
- Born: September 7, 1993 (age 32) Valdemarsvik, Sweden
- Height: 5 ft 10 in (178 cm)
- Weight: 185 lb (84 kg; 13 st 3 lb)
- Position: Defense
- Shoots: Left
- Liiga team Former teams: Tappara; AIK; Örebro HK; Luleå HF; Färjestad BK
- Playing career: 2011–present

Jonathan Andersson (born September 7, 1993) is a Swedish professional ice hockey Defenseman, currently playing for Tappara in the Liiga.

== Playing career ==
Andersson played as a youth and made his Elitserien debut with AIK IF during the 2012–13 season.

After four seasons in the SHL with Örebro HK, Andersson left the club at the conclusion of his contract and agreed to a two-year deal with fellow Swedish club, Luleå HF, on 5 May 2021.

During the 2024–25 season, having appearing in 21 games with Färjestad BK and registering 4 assists, Andersson left the club and transferred to the Finnish Liiga in joining Tappara on a two-year contract on 9 January 2025.

== Career statistics ==
			Regular season					Playoffs
Season	Team	League	GP	G	A	Pts	PIM	GP	G	A	Pts	PIM
2008–09	HC Vita Hästen	U16	3	0	1	1	2	—	—	—	—	—
2009–10	Almtuna IS	J18	20	2	1	3	14	—	—	—	—	—
2009–10	Almtuna IS	J18	16	2	2	4	4	—	—	—	—	—
2010–11	Almtuna IS	J18	21	4	9	13	58	—	—	—	—	—
2010–11	Almtuna IS	J20	28	7	13	20	16	2	1	0	1	2
2011–12	AIK IF	J20	41	2	7	9	30	3	0	1	1	4
2012–13	AIK IF	J20	24	1	8	9	74	3	0	3	3	2
2012–13	AIK IF	SEL	30	0	1	1	6	—	—	—	—	—
2013–14	AIK IF	J20	14	4	11	15	8	—	—	—	—	—
2013–14	AIK IF	SHL	42	0	4	4	12	—	—	—	—	—
2013–14	IK Oskarshamn	Allsv	4	0	0	0	2	—	—	—	—	—
2014–15	AIK IF	J20	3	0	0	0	0	—	—	—	—	—
2014–15	AIK IF	Allsv	48	0	11	11	49	—	—	—	—	—
2015–16	AIK IF	Allsv	50	7	25	32	41	10	2	4	6	0
2016–17	AIK IF	Allsv	16	0	4	4	8	8	2	6	8	0
2017–18	Örebro HK	SHL	48	3	14	17	26	—	—	—	—	—
2018–19	Örebro HK	SHL	52	3	7	10	22	2	0	1	1	2
2019–20	Örebro HK	SHL	52	4	13	17	30	—	—	—	—	—
2020–21	Örebro HK	SHL	52	2	11	13	24	9	1	1	2	2
2021–22	Luleå HF	SHL	42	3	10	13	8	17	0	0	0	0
2022–23	Luleå HF	SHL	52	5	13	18	24	4	1	2	3	0
2023–24	Färjestad BK	SHL	49	4	9	13	36	4	0	0	0	4
2024–25	Färjestad BK	SHL	21	0	4	4	4	—	—	—	—	—
2024–25	Tappara	Liiga	13	0	0	0	4	9	1	0	1	8
SHL totals			440	24	86	110	192	36	2	4	6	8
