= Ville Runola =

Finnish ice hockey player

- Born: January 4, 1993 (age 32); Turku, Finland
- Height: 6 ft 0 in (183 cm)
- Weight: 165 lb (75 kg; 11 st 11 lb)
- Position: Goaltender
- Catches: Left
- SM-liiga team: HC TPS
- Playing career: 2012–present

Ville Runola (born January 4, 1993) is a Finnish ice hockey defenceman. His is currently playing with HC TPS in the Finnish SM-liiga.

Runola made his SM-liiga debut on October 27, 2012, playing with HC TPS during the 2012–13 SM-liiga season, when he came into the game in relief of Atte Engren.
