= Almén =

Almén or Almen is a given name and surname. Notable people with the name include:

== Surname ==
- Antonio Almen (born 2004), Finnish footballer
- Emil Almén, Swedish actor
- Ina Almén
- Jonas Almén
- Mikael Almén (born 2000), Finnish football player
- Rune Almén (born 1952), Swedish track and field athlete
- Ruth Almén (1870–1945), Swedish writer and composer

== Given name ==
- Almen Abdi (born 1986), Swiss footballer
- Almen Bibic, Swedish ice hockey player
