= Matt Bailey =

Canadian ice hockey player (born 1991)

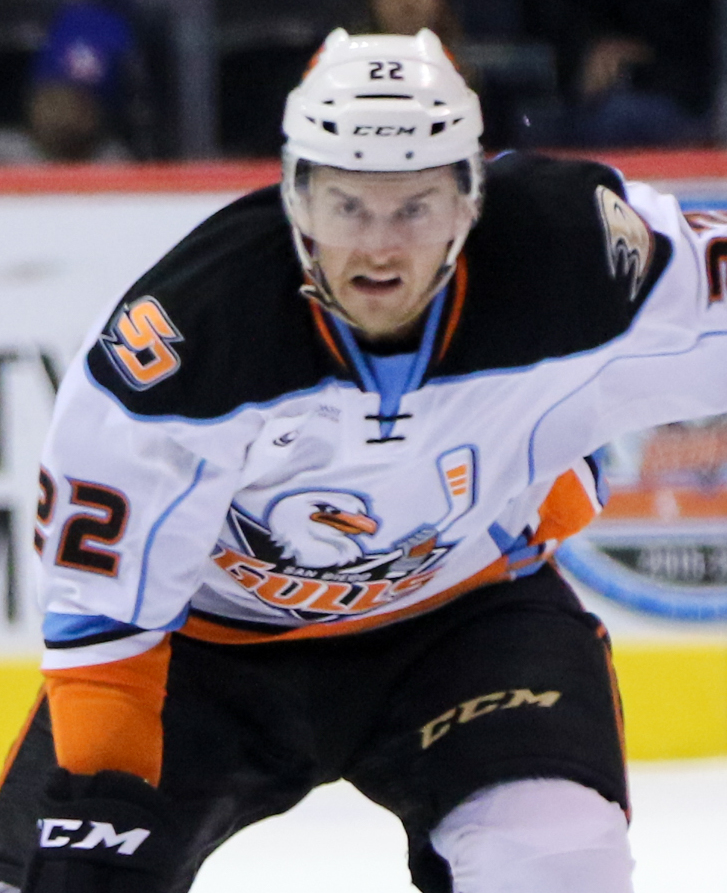
- Bailey in 2015
- Born: April 5, 1991 (age 35) Oakbank, Manitoba, Canada
- Height: 6 ft 1 in (185 cm)
- Weight: 196 lb (89 kg; 14 st 0 lb)
- Position: Forward
- Shoots: Left
- Allsv team Former teams: Södertälje SK; Norfolk Admirals; San Diego Gulls; Stockton Heat; Mora IK; ERC Ingolstadt
- NHL draft: Undrafted
- Playing career: 2014–present

Matthew Bailey (born April 5, 1991) is a Canadian professional ice hockey player. He is currently playing with Södertälje SK in the HockeyAllsvenskan (Allsv).

== Playing career ==
Bailey played for the Alaska Anchorage Seawolves in the NCAA Men's Division I Western Collegiate Hockey Association (WCHA). In his senior year, Bailey's outstanding play was rewarded with a selection to the 2013–14 All-WCHA First Team.

On March 26, 2014, the Anaheim Ducks of the National Hockey League (NHL) signed Bailey as an undrafted free agent to a two-year entry-level contract and on March 28, 2014, he made his professional debut with the Norfolk Admirals of the American Hockey League.

After his entry-level contract with the Ducks, Bailey was not tendered a qualifying offer to retain his rights on June 27, 2016. As a free agent, Bailey belatedly signed to a one-year AHL contract with the Stockton Heat, the primary affiliate to the Calgary Flames on September 6, 2016. In the 2016–17 season, Bailey split between the Flames' AHL and ECHL affiliates, appearing in 17 games for 7 points with the Heat before opting to sign his first contract abroad in agreeing to join Swedish second division club, Mora IK in their upcoming playoff quest on February 10, 2017.

After spending two full seasons in the Swedish Hockey League with Mora IK, Bailey left as a free agent following their return to the Allsvenskan after the 2018–19 season. On July 22, 2019, Bailey agreed to a one-year contract with German club, ERC Ingolstadt of the Deutsche Eishockey Liga (DEL). In the 2019–20 season, Bailey adapted quickly with ERC by registering 9 goals and 25 points through 48 regular season games.

With the COVID-19 pandemic ending the DEL season before the playoffs, Bailey left the club as a free agent to return to the Swedish Allsvenskan by agreeing to a one-year contract with Södertälje SK on June 12, 2020.

== Career statistics ==
=== Regular season and playoffs ===
			Regular season					Playoffs
Season	Team	League	GP	G	A	Pts	PIM	GP	G	A	Pts	PIM
2007–08	Neepawa Natives	MJHL	56	13	15	28	63	—	—	—	—	—
2008–09	Tri-City Storm	USHL	58	10	14	24	49	—	—	—	—	—
2009–10	Sioux Falls Stampede	USHL	59	14	33	47	69	3	2	0	2	2
2010–11	U. of Alaska-Anchorage	WCHA	30	10	10	20	23	—	—	—	—	—
2011–12	U. of Alaska-Anchorage	WCHA	34	10	7	17	30	—	—	—	—	—
2012–13	U. of Alaska-Anchorage	WCHA	36	7	12	19	65	—	—	—	—	—
2013–14	U. of Alaska-Anchorage	WCHA	38	20	18	38	49	—	—	—	—	—
2013–14	Norfolk Admirals	AHL	11	2	1	3	8	10	0	2	2	10
2014–15	Norfolk Admirals	AHL	56	6	4	10	31	—	—	—	—	—
2015–16	San Diego Gulls	AHL	51	6	13	19	34	8	1	2	3	8
2016–17	Stockton Heat	AHL	17	2	5	7	22	—	—	—	—	—
2016–17	Adirondack Thunder	ECHL	6	3	6	9	4	—	—	—	—	—
2016–17	Mora IK	Allsv	7	3	3	6	8	9	7	2	9	14
2017–18	Mora IK	SHL	52	10	6	16	46	—	—	—	—	—
2018–19	Mora IK	SHL	41	6	12	18	57	—	—	—	—	—
2019–20	ERC Ingolstadt	DEL	48	9	16	25	64	—	—	—	—	—
AHL totals			135	16	23	39	95	18	1	4	5	18

=== International ===
Year	Team	Event	Result	GP	G	A	Pts	PIM
2008	Canada Western	U17	3rd place, bronze medalist(s)	4	0	0	0	2
Junior totals				4	0	0	0	2

== Awards and honours ==
Award	Year
College
All-WCHA First Team	2013–14
