= Joakim Hagelin =

Swedish ice hockey player (born 1989)

- Born: April 30, 1989 (age 37) Linköping, Sweden
- Height: 6 ft 2 in (188 cm)
- Weight: 192 lb (87 kg; 13 st 10 lb)
- Position: Winger
- Shoots: Left
- HA team Former teams: Västerviks IK; Linköpings HC; Djurgårdens IF; AIK IF; IK Oskarshamn; Modo Hockey
- NHL draft: Undrafted
- Playing career: 2009–present

Joakim Hagelin (born April 30, 1989) is a Swedish ice hockey player. He currently plays for Västerviks IK of the HockeyAllsvenskan.

Hagelin made his Swedish Hockey League debut playing with Linköpings HC during the 2013–14 SHL season.
