= Andreas Englund =

Swedish ice hockey player (born 1996)

- Born: 21 January 1996 (age 30) Stockholm, Sweden
- Height: 6 ft 3 in (191 cm)
- Weight: 190 lb (86 kg; 13 st 8 lb)
- Position: Defence
- Shoots: Left
- NHL team Former teams: Detroit Red Wings; Djurgårdens IF; Ottawa Senators; Colorado Avalanche; Chicago Blackhawks; Los Angeles Kings; Nashville Predators
- NHL draft: 40th overall, 2014; Ottawa Senators
- Playing career: 2013–present

Andreas Englund (born 21 January 1996) is a Swedish professional ice hockey defenceman for the Detroit Red Wings of the National Hockey League (NHL). Englund was selected by the Ottawa Senators in the second round (40th overall) of the 2014 NHL entry draft.

== Playing career ==
Englund made his professional debut in the 2013–14 season, with his youth club Djurgårdens IF of the then HockeyAllsvenskan. Following the club's promotion Englund made his Swedish Hockey League (SHL) during the 2014–15 season, appearing in 49 games for five points in his rookie campaign.

After two full seasons in the SHL, marking 95 appearances, Englund left Sweden to sign a three-year, entry-level contract with the Ottawa Senators on 5 April 2016. On 3 December 2016, Englund made his NHL debut with the Senators in a 2–0 victory over the Florida Panthers.

As an impending restricted free agent, and facing a delayed 2020–21 North American season, Englund remained in Sweden by agreeing to a season-long contract with Västerviks IK of the HockeyAllsvenskan on 20 September 2020. Due to injury, however, Englund sat out the season.

With his rights relinquished by the Senators after not receiving a qualifying offer, Englund agreed to a one-year AHL contract with the Colorado Eagles, the primary affiliate of the Colorado Avalanche, on 28 July 2021. In the 2021–22 season, Englund featured regularly on the Eagles blueline. He registered two goals and 12 points through 57 games to help the Eagles reach the playoffs.

As a free agent, Englund re-signed with the Avalanche organization on a one-year, two-way NHL contract on 13 July 2022. He was returned to the Eagles following training camp to begin the 2022–23 season. He featured in 12 games with the Eagles before he was recalled to the NHL by the Avalanche on 13 November 2022 due to a rash of injuries. He made his debut with the Avalanche the following day, his first NHL game in over two years, featuring in a 3–2 defeat by the St. Louis Blues. With the Avalanche blighted by injuries, Englund solidified his defensive role and contributed three assists in 36 games.

On 26 February 2023, Englund was dealt to the Chicago Blackhawks for Jack Johnson. Englund played the remainder of the season for the rebuilding Blackhawks, registering one assist in 11 games.

On 1 July 2023, Englund signed a two-year, $2 million contract with the Los Angeles Kings. In the 2023–24 season, Englund was a fixture on the Kings' blueline in a third-pairing role. In featuring in every game, Englund established new career marks with 1 goal and 10 points in 82 appearances.

In the following 2024–25 season, his final year under contract, Englund was unable to retain his role on the Kings blueline remaining on the roster primarily as a healthy scratch in posting 1 goal through 11 games. Englund was later placed on waivers by the Kings and subsequently claimed by the Nashville Predators on 10 February 2025.

After two seasons within the Predators organization, Englund left as a free agent and was signed to a one-year, two-way contract with the Calgary Flames for the 2026–27 season on July 1, 2026. Englund was placed on waivers by the Flames during the pre-season and on 26 September 2026, he was subsequently claimed by the Detroit Red Wings.

== Career statistics ==
=== Regular season and playoffs ===
			Regular season					Playoffs
Season	Team	League	GP	G	A	Pts	PIM	GP	G	A	Pts	PIM
2012–13	Djurgårdens IF	J20	2	0	0	0	0	—	—	—	—	—
2013–14	Djurgårdens IF	J20	33	5	5	10	26	—	—	—	—	—
2013–14	Djurgårdens IF	Allsv	19	1	1	2	14	10	0	0	0	6
2014–15	Djurgårdens IF	J20	2	0	0	0	2	7	0	2	2	10
2014–15	Djurgårdens IF	SHL	49	2	3	5	32	2	0	0	0	0
2015–16	Djurgårdens IF	SHL	46	2	4	6	36	8	0	0	0	4
2015–16	Djurgårdens IF	J20	—	—	—	—	—	2	1	0	1	0
2016–17	Binghamton Senators	AHL	69	3	7	10	82	—	—	—	—	—
2016–17	Ottawa Senators	NHL	5	0	0	0	2	—	—	—	—	—
2017–18	Belleville Senators	AHL	69	1	9	10	69	—	—	—	—	—
2017–18	Ottawa Senators	NHL	1	0	0	0	0	—	—	—	—	—
2018–19	Belleville Senators	AHL	68	3	11	14	77	—	—	—	—	—
2018–19	Ottawa Senators	NHL	3	0	0	0	10	—	—	—	—	—
2019–20	Belleville Senators	AHL	22	0	0	0	32	—	—	—	—	—
2019–20	Ottawa Senators	NHL	24	0	3	3	12	—	—	—	—	—
2021–22	Colorado Eagles	AHL	57	2	10	12	103	8	1	1	2	30
2022–23	Colorado Eagles	AHL	15	1	2	3	47	—	—	—	—	—
2022–23	Colorado Avalanche	NHL	36	0	3	3	26	—	—	—	—	—
2022–23	Chicago Blackhawks	NHL	11	0	1	1	9	—	—	—	—	—
2023–24	Los Angeles Kings	NHL	82	1	9	10	81	5	0	1	1	9
2024–25	Los Angeles Kings	NHL	11	1	0	1	12	—	—	—	—	—
2024–25	Nashville Predators	NHL	24	0	2	2	36	—	—	—	—	—
2025–26	Milwaukee Admirals	AHL	52	3	10	13	65	—	—	—	—	—
2025–26	Nashville Predators	NHL	3	0	0	0	2	—	—	—	—	—
NHL totals			200	2	18	20	190	5	0	1	1	9

=== International ===
Year	Team	Event	Result	GP	G	A	Pts	PIM
2013	Sweden	U17	1st place, gold medalist(s)	6	0	0	0	6
2013	Sweden	IH18	7th	4	1	1	2	4
2014	Sweden	U18	4th	7	0	0	0	6
2015	Sweden	WJC	4th	7	0	0	0	2
2016	Sweden	WJC	4th	7	0	2	2	10
Junior totals				31	1	3	4	28
