= Västerviks IK =

- City: Västervik, Småland
- League: HockeyEttan
- Founded: 28 April 1971
- Home arena: Plivit Arena
- Colors: Goal red, union blue
- General manager: Victor Öhman
- Head coach: Nichlas Falk
- Website: vikhockey.se

Västerviks Ishockeyklubb (English: Vasterviks Ice hockey club) – commonly known as Västerviks IK or VIK – is a professional ice hockey team based in Västervik, Sweden. They currently play in the third tier league in Swedish ice hockey system, HockeyEttan. The club had spent decades yo-yoing between the third and fourth tiers of Swedish ice hockey, Division 1 and Division 2, before securing promotion on March 31, 2016, to HockeyAllsvenskan for the 2016–17 season.

The club was founded on April 28, 1971, when Västerviks AIS chose to close down its hockey section and only invest in football. The club got their nickname early on and is popularly called Vikarna. Västerviks home venue is Plivit Arena in central Västervik, which has a capacity of 2,500 people. The club almost reached the Swedish Hockey League (SHL) during the 1996–97 season and had a very successful season 2020–21 when they reached the semifinals, but went out against Timrå IK.

== History ==
=== Background and establishment ===
Västerviks IK was formed on April 28, 1971. Since IFK Västervik closed its ice hockey operations in 1964, Västerviks AIS was the only ice hockey club in the city. Västerviks AIS also played football and many of their members wanted the club to only invest in that business, as they considered hockey to be too expensive to play. Once Västerviks AIS started discussing the closure of its ice hockey business, this became a signal to a few ice hockey friends in the city, who did not think that Västervik, which already had strong ice hockey traditions, would be without an ice hockey team. Västerviks AIS decided at a members' meeting in the spring of 1971 to close down ice hockey as a program in their association.

Not long after that, a new ice hockey club in the city had come to life, but this time with the name Västerviks Ice hockey club. Gunnar Thelin was appointed the club's very first chairman and Sven-Åke Ohlsson the club's first coach. Per-Olof Nilsson was team manager but was later during the debut season replaced by Sven-Åke Lindblad.

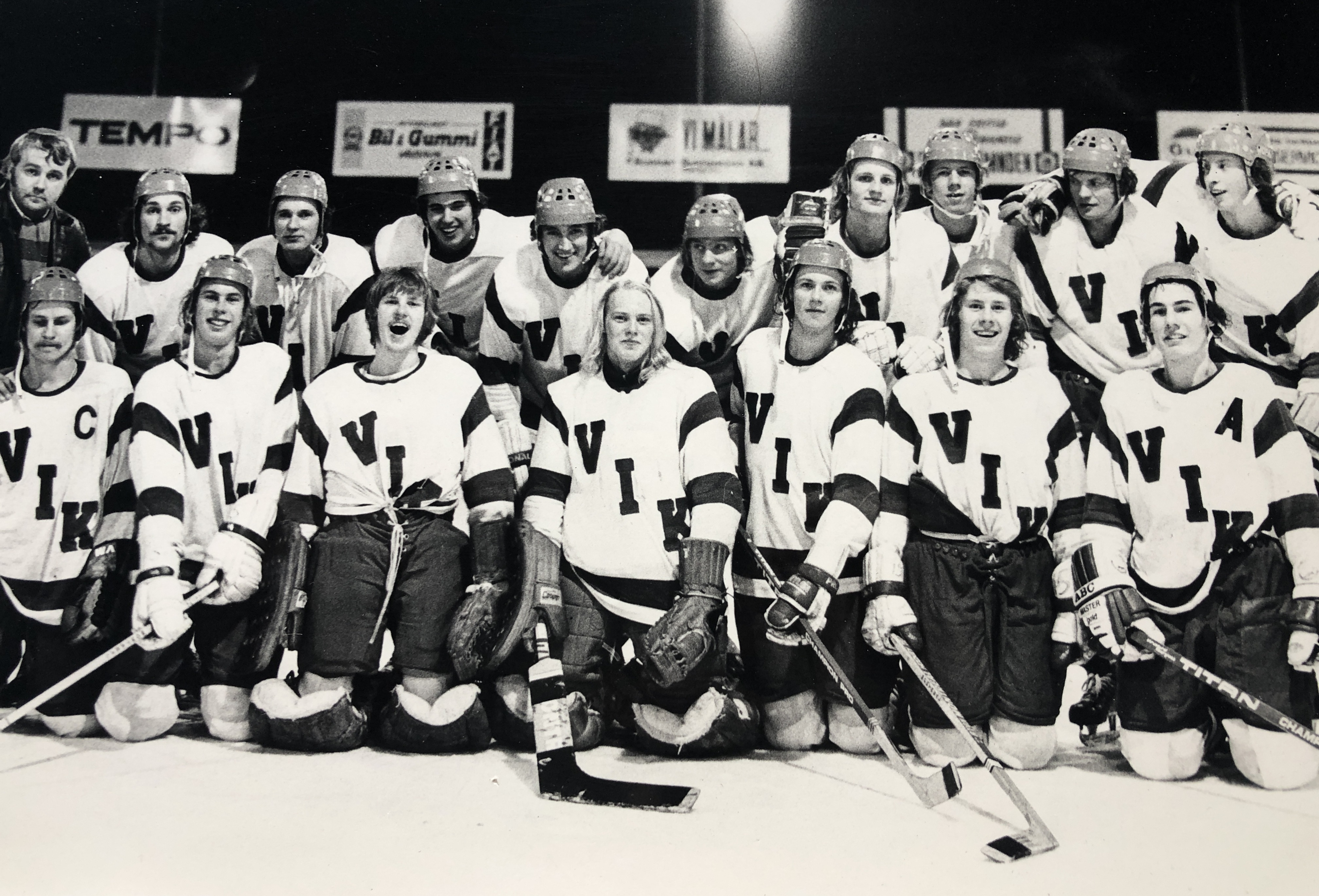
Västerviks IK, in the early 70s

Västerviks IK breathed optimism in the city before the start of the series. Four established new acquisitions could be presented. These were Lennart Lindqvist from Troja-Ljungby, Bertil Berggren and Göran Carlsson from Nybro and Tommy Carlsson from Malmö FF. VIK made some good training matches, including victory away in the District Championship against Vimmerby with 6–3. The first training match in front of a home crowd meant a big victory 11–1 against Hultsfred. The league game in Division 2 started away against Boro Vetlanda and VIK fell 6–4. VIK had taken over Västerviks AIS large youth activities. 22 boys' teams participated in VT/VIK's series games and 220 boys and 15 girls participated in the ice hockey school.

Now awaited home premiere, a recorded derby match against Vimmerby. It was a flat fall and a loss of 1–7 in front of just over 1,400 spectators. Despite four good new acquisitions, the gloomy pattern from the premiere season was repeated. IFK Norrköping/IK Sleipner (later Vita Hästen) won the series before strong Örebro. It was remarkable that VIK managed to reach 1–1 against the league winners IFK Norrköping/IK Sleipner on away ice. VIK made several even matches but could not bear the whole matches. VIK only managed to scrape together 5 points in the entire series.

Per Lyck became Västervik's premier shooter and he also won the internal shooting league with his 11 goals. Other prominent profiles were J-Å Stillman, Bengt Karlsson, Bertil Berggren, Lennart Lindqvist and goalkeeper Berth Johansson. This was the first season when it was mandatory to wear a face mask for goalkeepers.

=== The club gets an arena after many circumstances ===
On March 14, 1984, Västervik municipality said yes to an ice rink in Västervik. A foundation was to be formed and VIK was to collect €70 000, which they also succeeded in doing. In the end, there was great uncertainty ahead of the decisive vote in the council. There was a great risk that the ice rink would be voted out by the municipality's politicians. When the vote was over, the majority was 40–34 for an ice rink. 36 out of 38 Social Democrats voted yes, as did two Christian Democrats, a Centre Party member and a Liberals member. The debate about an ice rink in Västervik had been going on during every season for 15 years.

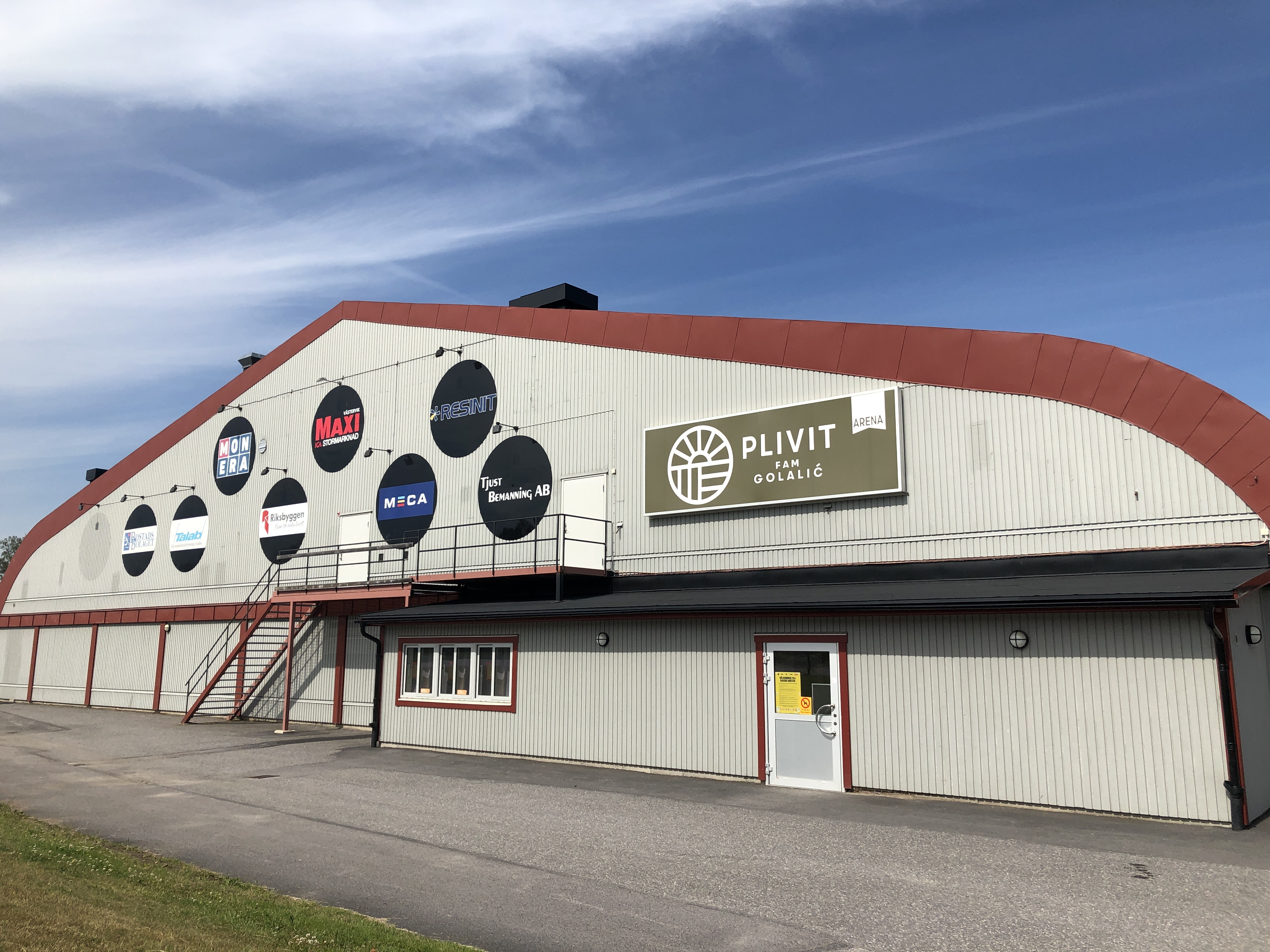
Plivit Arena, earlier Tjusthallen

In May of the same year, the first sod was dug in the Bökensved area when municipal councilor Gunnar Oskarsson took a seat in an excavator and began construction. Already in the summer, large wooden beams rose over the old outdoor rink. The ice rink became the country's 154th ice rink and was named Tjusthallen.

On November 24, 1984, Tjusthallen was inaugurated. On the opening day, VIK crushed visiting Eksjö by a full 24–0 in front of around 1,400 cheering spectators. Johan Rampeltin became Tjusthallen's first official goal scorer. Already on November 9, the first official match was played in the hall when VIK beat Valdemarsvik 10–2 in a training match. Prior to the season, VIK had for several years conducted a rational summer training under Anders Liffner's leadership. Kjell Fagerström was hired as an ice coach who then moved from the city during the season and was replaced by Curt Svensson from Vimmerby.

VIK was played in Div.IV with only three A-teams and four B-teams. VIK noted many big victories and ended up as series winners. However, the team was not ready for Div.III. For VIK, an uncertain qualifier now awaited against the series winners in the Östgöstseries, Motala AIF. The best of three matches was in this play-off. The first match, in Motala, was a very dramatic one and went to overtime. There VIK lost and suddenly the Div.III place was not so obvious. The loss was an alarm clock and for the return match the veterans Johan Wiström, Roger Svensson and Stefan Knutsson were called in. It was a clear VIK victory with 9–4 and thanks to a better goal difference, VIK got the decisive match at home. That match was extremely dramatic but in the end VIK was the winner with 6–5 and the Div.III place was secured.

=== Season 1996–97 ===
The club almost reached Sweden's highest league, SHL, when they knocked out Sunne IK in playoff 1, and Huddinge IK in playoff 2. But in playoff 3, Linköping HC became too difficult and took the place in SHL.

=== 2015 a new era began ===
The 2015–16 season would be a season Västervik would soon forget. The team qualified for the HockeyAllsvenskan for the first time in the club's history after winning 27 matches out of 36 in Hockeyettan. With that, the qualifying series awaited, where they had to face the teams Södertälje SK, Troja/Ljungby, IF Sundvall, Asplöven and Borlänge.

Once in the qualifying series, they started by meeting Borlänge away from home where they fell 4–1, after that they rose to prominence and went through the qualifying series with annoying matches that they managed to get the points they needed. It was on March 31, 2016, that VIK received Södertälje SK at home that everything would apply. Södertälje who are already ready for games in the HockeyAllsvenskan 2016–17 would receive a VIK who had nothing to lose. Västervik took the lead in the first period through Joacim Hedblad - and in the second period the discharge would come. Eric Backman made it 2–0, Victor Öhman put 3–0 in power play and Victor Romfors 4–0 after 13 minutes in the intermediate round. Johan Skinnars comforted for Södertälje in the third period, but Västervik held off without any major problems, eventually won 5–1 and were thus ready for the HockeyAllsvenskan 2016–2017. 2,450 people came and watched the match and that meant that VIK had a new audience record. Joacim Hedblad won the internal scoring league with 48 points while Joakim Thelin won the internal shooting league with his 24 hits. Victor Öhman, on the other hand, won the points league in the entire qualifying series with ten points.

On September 15, 2016, Västervik played the first HockeyAllsvenskan match at Hovet against AIK. It was the start of a season that ended in success. A third place in the regular season and a second place in the playoff who meant that Västervik was knocked out. AIK went forward on goal difference.

In the 2017–18 season, Västervik played their second season in the HockeyAllsvenskan after taking third place in the debut season in the league the year before. However, this season would not go to VIK's advantage. The team finished second last in the series and thus had to play a qualifying series to stay in the HockeyAllsvenskan.

Once in the playoff series, you meet four teams from Hockeyettan, Västerås IK, Huddinge IK, Borlänge HF and Piteå HC as well as Troja/Ljungby who had finished last in the HockeyAllsvenskan. VIK managed to win 7 out of 10 matches and thus finished in first place and could thus breathe a sigh of relief after securing the HockeyAllsvenska contract. Västerås IK came second in the series and thus took Troja/Ljungby's place in the league which finished in third place in the playoff series.

Before the 2018–19 season, VIK was tipped in the bottom battle by more or less all experts, but after a good finish to the regular season, they managed to pinch the last playoff spot and thus finished in sixth place. Once in the playoffs, they finished second to last, 1 point ahead of Karlskrona HK. Kellen Jones and Darren Nowick won the internal points league with a total of 30 points collected, while Victor Öhman won the internal shooting league with 16 goals. Emil Kruse came in fifth place in the entire HockeyAllsvenskan with a save percentage of 92.16%. It is noteworthy that Kruse made the second most saves in the entire league, as many as 1,126. After 26 home matches, VIK's audience average of 1,449 spectators ended.

Västervik equipped for another season in Sweden's second highest ice hockey division, which would be the club's fifth in a row. Important players had left the team during last year's season, for example, the two internal points winners Darren Nowick and Rob Bordson had left for Skellefteå AIK and the Finnish HPK. The team's best defender in terms of points, Erik Ullman, left after the end of the season and signed for league competitor Björklöven. They also lost Ken Jäger, who had been given a "breakout season" as he went from seven points in the 2018–19 season to 19 points the following season. Even though the losses of players looked big for the club at this point, some important and big names came in instead. The faithful servant Victor Öhman had previously extended his contract, as did another loyal player, Erik Gustafsson. Other important names such as Oskar Drugge, Jacob Bjerselius, Tim Wahlgren, Oscar Pettersson and Marcus Westfält also extended. In mid-May 2020, it came as a "transfer bomb" that the American hill Michael Kapla, with merits from the National Hockey League (NHL), had signed a one-year contract with the club.

Hockeyallsvenskan chose before the season that the clubs in the league would be allowed to borrow players from various NHL organizations, a decision that the SHL had already said no to. This of course opened many doors for the HockeyAllsvenskan clubs and then also Västervik. Axel Jonsson-Fjällby, who belonged to the Washington Capitals, came in and became perhaps the one who made the most impression in the club during his loan period. At the same time, they brought in Eetu Tuulola from the Calgary Flames, goalkeeper Felix Sandström from the Philadelphia Flyers and finally Andreas Englund from the Ottawa Senators (who, however, never came to the Allsvenskan game when he injured himself during a training match against rival Vimmerby). Västervik continued to fill the squad with important and big names, Gerry Fitzgerald, the twin brothers Conner and Kellen Jones, the HockeyAllsvenskan profile Joakim Hagelin, Zach Budish and Ryan Gropp. At the same time, they recruited Daniel Marmenlind from Visby/Roma who had been loaned to the club during last year's season in four matches. During the season, Emil Andrae was also borrowed from HV71.

Västervik started the HockeyAllsvenska season on October 2, 2020, when they defeated AIK at Hovet in central Stockholm 4–2. This was just the beginning of a season that would end in success for the Småland club. They managed to beat league runner-up Timrå IK twice out of four, it is noteworthy that Timrå won the entire league with 22 points before league runner-up Karlskoga and a plus/minus statistic of 98. Västervik finished in fifth place in the league, which was the club's second best position in the HockeyAllsvenskan since they came with the 2016–17 season. Thanks to its placement, Västervik had to skip the round of 16 and go straight to the quarter-finals. The HockeyAllsvenskan and SHL had together decided on how the playoffs in both leagues would be carried out. The two teams that came last in the SHL played a match series against each other in the best of 7 matches where the loser went out and played the Hockeyallsvenskan next season. In the Hockeyallsvenskan, it worked that the three best teams from the final table had to choose opponents based on those who made it to the quarterfinals. It is noteworthy then that none of the top three teams chose to face Västervik, instead Västervik had to face Södertälje. Västervik then beat Södertälje 3–1 in matches, after losing the first match but then winning three straight. In the semifinals, the series winners Timrå IK became a number too big and beat VIK 4–2 in matches. The season, which went to one of the club's very best of all time, was thus over.

== Players and staff ==
(Last Updated: 26 July 2021)

Nr	Pos	Player	Country	S/H	Date of birth	Height	Weight	Place of birth
GOALTENDERS
X	G	Henrik Lundberg	Sweden	L	January 14, 1991	183 cm; 6 ft 0 in	82 kg; 181 lb	Gothenburg
92	G	Edvin Olofsson	Sweden	L	January 17, 1998	185 cm; 6 ft 1 in	85 kg; 187 lb	-
DEFENSEMEN
4	D	Johannes Johannesen	Norway	R	Mars 1, 2997	182 cm; 6 ft 0 in	83 kg; 183 lb	Stavanger
14	D	Erik Gustafsson	Sweden	L	December 18, 1992	182 cm; 6 ft 0 in	82 kg; 181 lb	Oskarshamn
16	D	Hugo Gabrielson	Sweden	L	October 24, 2002	185 cm; 6 ft 1 in	78 kg; 172 lb	-
43	D	Max Krogdahl	Norway	R	October 21, 1998	188 cm; 6 ft 2 in	100 kg; 220 lb	Asker
44	D	Martin Fransson	Sweden	L	October 3, 1998	196 cm; 6 ft 5 in	88 kg; 194 lb	-
FORWARDS
6	W/C	Lucas Feuk	Sweden	L	February 19, 2001	184 cm; 6 ft 0 in	86 kg; 190 lb	Stockholm
13	C/RW	Brett Supinski	USA	R	21 July 1995	183 cm; 6 ft 0 in	77 kg; 170 lb	Collegeville, PA
10	LW/C	Mattias Wigley	Sweden	L	February 18, 1994	182 cm; 6 ft 0 in	90 kg; 200 lb	Stockholm
17	LW/C	Myles Powell	Canada	R	July 24, 1994	175 cm; 5 ft 9 in	82 kg; 181 lb	Comox, BC
20	C	Marcus Westfält	Sweden	L	May 12, 2000	191 cm; 6 ft 3 in	92 kg; 203 lb	Stockholm
21	LW	Victor Öhman	Sweden	L	April 7, 1992	185 cm; 6 ft 1 in	92 kg; 203 lb	Malmö
50	LW/C	Kellen Jones	Canada	L	August 16, 1990	175 cm; 5 ft 9 in	82 kg; 181 lb	Montrose
68	LW/RW	Joakim Hagelin	Sweden	L	April 30, 1989	189 cm; 6 ft 2 in	90 kg; 200 lb	Linköping
91	C/RW	Tim Wahlgren	Sweden	L	Mars 8, 1998	184 cm; 6 ft 0 in	84 kg; 185 lb	Kramfors

=== Team staff ===
Position	Name
Head coach	Martin Gudmundsson
Asst. Coach	Niklas Czarnecki
Goaltending Coach	Gabriel Remelin
General manager	Emil Georgsson
Equipment manager	Jörgen Fransson
Equipment manager	Felix Gustafsson
Athletic Trainer	Anders Dahl

=== Retired number ===
Västerviks IK have only retired one number. Niklas Dacke, who wore jersey number 22, represented the club from the 1991–92 season until the 2001–02 season. A total of 11 seasons and 384 regular- and playoff games. Västervik retired number 22 on December 27, 2016, on the opening game of the season against Kristianstads IK.

Västerviks Ishockeyklubb retired number
No.	Player	Position	Tenure	Date of honour
22	Niklas Dacke	D	1991–2001	December 27, 2016

== Jerseys and logo ==
=== Jerseys ===
When the club was founded in the early 1970s, they played in Västerviks AIS yellow-black-striped jerseys, but the jerseys soon changed when the club started playing with white jerseys with the initials VIK diagonal on the chest. It was later changed to solid red shirts with blue and white contour.

Ahead of the 2018–19 season, VIK changed their match jersey with a new special detail at the bottom of both the front and back of the jersey: the Västervik silhouette. The reason was that VIK the season before was nearly relegated from Hockeyallsvenskan after finishing in 13th place in the league. The city, the municipality and companies in Västervik thus went in and sponsored the club with extra money. Among other things, the successful coach Mattias Karlin was recruited back to VIK after a short adventure in Mora IK, which then played in the SHL. Västervik then finished first in the qualifying series and could continue to play in the HockeyAllsvenskan. As a thank you, VIK wanted to pay tribute to the city and brought famous buildings from the city center, the famous buildings that made up the motif were: Spårö båk, S:t Petri Kyrka, Gamla varmbadhuset, S:ta Gertruds kyrka, Nya Slottholmen, Stegeholms Slottsruin and finally Unos torn. Västerviks IK still plays with this design today, but small changes have been made over the years such as the color of the collar, which was first white and which is now navy blue.

=== Logo ===
Västervik's club badge is a circle with the initials "Västervik's Ice Hockey Club 1971" written around it. In the middle are the abbreviations "VIK" and "Hockey" below. There are also two hockey clubs that cross each other diagonally.

== Season-by-season results in HockeyAllsvenskan ==
This is a partial list of the last five seasons completed by Västervik in Swedish-second league, HockeyAllsvenskan.

Code explanation; GP—Games played, W—Wins, L—Losses, T—Tied games, GF—Goals for, GA—Goals against, Pts—Points. Top Scorer: Points (Goals+Assists)

Season	League	Regular season								Post season results	Top scorer (regular season)
Season	League	Finish	GP	W	L	T	GF	GA	Pts	Post season results	Top scorer (regular season)
2016–17	HockeyAllsvenskan	3rd	52	25	17	10	138	117	90	2nd in the playoff series	(Sweden) Victor Öhman 35 (18+17)
2017–18	HockeyAllsvenskan	13th	52	19	24	9	133	142	69	1st in HockeyAllsvenskan qualifiers	(Sweden) Patrick Blomberg 32 (15+17)
2018–19	HockeyAllsvenskan	8th	52	16	19	17	136	130	76	6th in the playoff series	(Canada) Kellen Jones 30 (14+16)
2019–20	HockeyAllsvenskan	8th	52	16	23	13	121	151	68	Promotion Play Cancelled (COVID-19)	(Sweden) Rob Bordson 34 (10+24)
2020–21	HockeyAllsvenskan	5th	52	19	15	18	134	124	85	Lost in semi-finals, 2–4 (Timrå IK)	(United States) Michael Kapla 31 (8+23)

== NHL-players in Västervik ==
Västerviks IK has had a few players who played in the NHL and who sooner or later represented the club. Some players have played several matches and some have played significantly smaller matches for Västervik. For example, Kevin Stenlund is the player who played the most games and scored the most points in the NHL but played only two games in Västervik in the 2016/17 season, when he was on loan from HV71. It is noteworthy, however, that Stenlund scored four points in the two matches. Andreas Englund only played one training match for Västervik when he got a puck in the face which led to him not coming into play any more for the club. Michael Kapla is the player who has made the most games for Västervik and also played a few games for New Jersey Devils in the NHL.

Västervik, on the other hand, has had a number of players who have had been picked in the NHL entry draft. Marcus Davidsson is the one who went highest in the draft when he was selected as the 37th overall 2017 by Buffalo Sabres. Davidsson's brother, Jonathan Davidsson, who both played in Västervik together in the 2020–21 season, was also drafted 2017 as the 170th player overall but by Ottawa Senators. Niklas Eriksson, who was born and raised in Västervik, is the first player to play for the club that was drafted by an NHL organization, when he was selected by the Philadelphia Flyers as the 117th player in total in 1989. Emil Andrae, who was also is born and raised in the city, is the latest player to join the draft as he was also selected by the Philadelphia Flyers as the 54th player overall 2020.

During the HockeyAllsvenskan season 2020–21, the league allowed the clubs to borrow NHL players for their team. This was a decision the SHL had already said no to, which opened several doors for both Västervik and the other teams. This later led to Västervik getting a number of NHL players into their squad. For example, Axel Jonsson-Fjällby was loaned in from the Washington Capitals, the Finn Eetu Tuulola and the goalkeeper Felix Sandström. As previously stated, Jonathan and Marcus Davidsson, as well as Andreas Englund, also came in. However, all players left Västervik before the regular season was finished when they were called back by their NHL organizations to start the season there.

=== Players who played in the NHL ===
Name	Games	Points	Team	Refs
Kevin Stenlund	66	20	Columbus Blue Jackets	
Andreas Englund	33	3	Ottawa Senators	
Jonathan Davidsson	6	0	Ottawa Senators	
Michael Kapla	5	0	New Jersey Devils	
Connor Jones	4	0	New York Islanders	
