= Zach Budish =

American ice hockey forward (born 1991)

- Born: May 9, 1991 (age 35) Edina, Minnesota, U.S.
- Height: 6 ft 3 in (191 cm)
- Weight: 220 lb (100 kg; 15 st 10 lb)
- Position: Right wing/Center
- Shoots: Right
- Liiga team Former teams: TPS; Milwaukee Admirals; Jukurit
- NHL draft: 41st overall, 2009; Nashville Predators
- Playing career: 2013–present

Zach Budish (born May 9, 1991) is an American professional ice hockey forward, currently playing with the Västerviks IK of the HockeyAllsvenskan (Allsv).

== Playing career ==
Budish was drafted 41st overall by the Nashville Predators in the 2009 NHL entry draft. Following his draft selection he spent five years with the University of Minnesota before joining the Predators on an entry-level contract on April 3, 2013. He would spend the next three seasons with the Predators' affiliated teams, the Milwaukee Admirals of the American Hockey League and the Cincinnati Cyclones of the ECHL.

On August 31, 2016, Budish signed for Finnish Liiga team Mikkelin Jukurit. On February 12, 2018, he signed for TPS of Liiga.

== Career statistics ==
			Regular season					Playoffs
Season	Team	League	GP	G	A	Pts	PIM	GP	G	A	Pts	PIM
2006–07	Edina High	USHS	31	22	25	47	—	—	—	—	—	—
2007–08	Edina High	USHS	30	26	37	63	—	—	—	—	—	—
2008–09	Team Southwest	USHS	15	14	13	27	12	—	—	—	—	—
2009–10	U. of Minnesota	WCHA	39	7	10	17	45	—	—	—	—	—
2010–11	U. of Minnesota	WCHA	7	2	4	6	2	—	—	—	—	—
2011–12	U. of Minnesota	WCHA	43	12	23	35	43	—	—	—	—	—
2012–13	U. of Minnesota	WCHA	40	14	22	36	14	—	—	—	—	—
2012–13	Milwaukee Admirals	AHL	9	1	3	4	0	3	0	0	0	2
2013–14	Milwaukee Admirals	AHL	41	3	6	9	22	—	—	—	—	—
2013–14	Cincinnati Cyclones	ECHL	16	3	6	9	6	24	6	5	11	12
2014–15	Milwaukee Admirals	AHL	43	6	8	14	18	—	—	—	—	—
2014–15	Cincinnati Cyclones	ECHL	30	8	15	23	20	—	—	—	—	—
2015–16	Cincinnati Cyclones	ECHL	69	24	34	58	26	7	1	2	3	6
2015–16	Milwaukee Admirals	ECHL	4	0	2	2	2	—	—	—	—	—
2016–17	Jukurit	Liiga	60	15	23	38	30	—	—	—	—	—
2017–18	Jukurit	Liiga	49	15	17	32	57	—	—	—	—	—
2017–18	TPS	Liiga	8	5	2	7	0	11	2	3	5	10
2018–19	TPS	Liiga	59	20	18	38	95	5	0	2	2	2
Liiga totals			176	55	60	115	182	16	2	5	7	12

== Awards and honors ==
Award	Year
College
WCHA All-Academic Team	2011, 2012, 2013
