= Max Oberrauch =

Italian ice hockey player

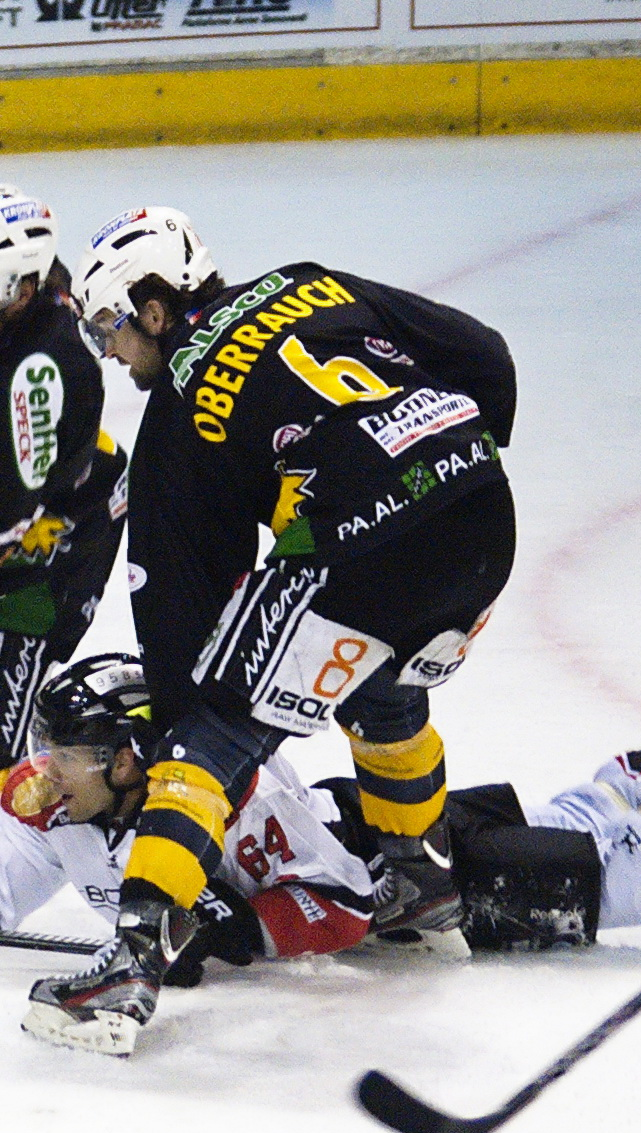
- Born: April 26, 1984 (age 42) Bolzano, Italy
- Height: 6 ft 0 in (183 cm)
- Weight: 203 lb (92 kg; 14 st 7 lb)
- Position: Forward
- Shoots: Left
- Serie A team: HC Pustertal Wölfe
- National team: Italy
- NHL draft: Undrafted
- Playing career: 2003–present

Max Oberrauch (born April 26, 1984) is an Italian professional ice hockey player. He is currently playing with the HC Pustertal Wölfe in the Italian Serie A.

He participated at the 2010 IIHF World Championship as a member of the Italian National men's ice hockey team.

He is brother-in-law of Swedish ice hockey player Jonas Almtorp.
