= Jonas Almtorp =

Swedish ice hockey player (born 1983)

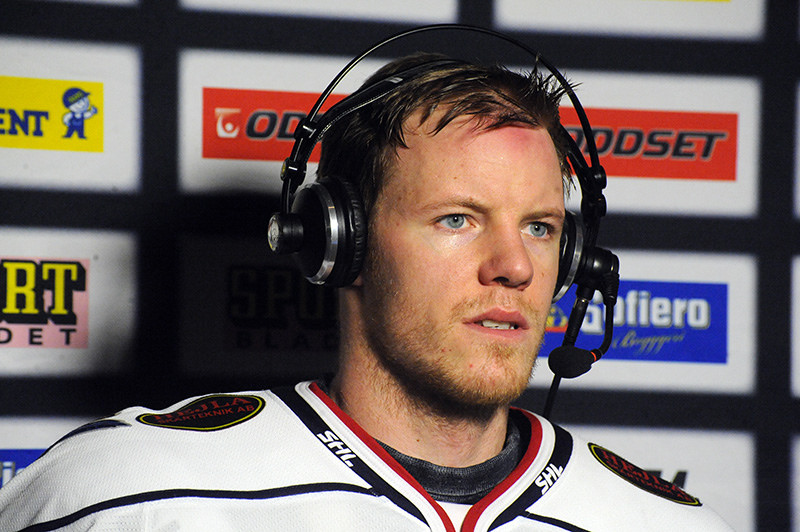
- Born: November 17, 1983 (age 43) Uppsala, Sweden
- Height: 1.85 m (6 ft 1 in)
- Weight: 86 kg (190 lb; 13 st 8 lb)
- Position: Centre
- Shot: Left
- Played for: Modo Hockey; Brynäs IF; Springfield Falcons; Luleå HF; Södertälje SK; Djurgårdens IF; Linköpings HC; Graz 99ers
- NHL draft: 111th overall, 2002; Edmonton Oilers
- Playing career: 2001–2018

Jonas Almtorp (born November 17, 1983) is a Swedish former professional ice hockey player who last played competitively with AIK IF in the HockeyAllsvenskan (Allsv).

== Playing career ==
He played in Brynäs IF 2005–2007, but moved to play with the Edmonton Oilers in the National Hockey League (NHL) before the 2007–08 season. He did not play any NHL, as he did not make the Oilers team, and only played in the AHL and ECHL. Before the 2007–08 season he returned to Elitserien to play in Luleå Hockey.

After three seasons with Linköpings HC, Almtorp left Sweden for only the second time in his career, in signing a one-year contract with Austrian club, Graz 99ers of the EBEL on September 9, 2015.

Almtorp is brother-in-law of Italian ice hockey player Max Oberrauch.

== Career statistics ==
=== Regular season and playoffs ===
| | | | Regular season | | | | | Playoffs |
| Season | Team | League | GP | G | A | Pts | PIM | GP | G | A | Pts | PIM |
|---|---|---|---|---|---|---|---|---|---|---|---|---|
| 1999–2000 | Modo Hockey | J18 Allsv | 14 | 13 | 7 | 20 | 51 | 8 | 6 | 5 | 11 | 4 |
| 1999–2000 | Modo Hockey | J20 | 7 | 1 | 0 | 1 | 0 | — | — | — | — | — |
| 2000–01 | Modo Hockey | J18 Allsv | 5 | 5 | 0 | 5 | 10 | 7 | 6 | 1 | 7 | 10 |
| 2000–01 | Modo Hockey | J20 | 20 | 14 | 7 | 21 | 24 | 2 | 0 | 0 | 0 | 4 |
| 2001–02 | Modo Hockey | J20 | 37 | 26 | 18 | 44 | 102 | 2 | 1 | 1 | 2 | 4 |
| 2001–02 | Modo Hockey | SEL | 3 | 0 | 0 | 0 | 0 | — | — | — | — | — |
| 2002–03 | Modo Hockey | J20 | 5 | 2 | 2 | 4 | 12 | — | — | — | — | — |
| 2002–03 | Modo Hockey | SEL | 28 | 1 | 1 | 2 | 22 | — | — | — | — | — |
| 2002–03 | Örnsköldsviks SK | Allsv | 12 | 5 | 4 | 9 | 49 | — | — | — | — | — |
| 2003–04 | Modo Hockey | J20 | 3 | 0 | 0 | 0 | 14 | — | — | — | — | — |
| 2003–04 | Modo Hockey | SEL | 20 | 0 | 0 | 0 | 4 | 3 | 0 | 0 | 0 | 0 |
| 2003–04 | IF Sundsvall Hockey | Allsv | 32 | 9 | 9 | 18 | 65 | — | — | — | — | — |
| 2004–05 | Almtuna IS | Allsv | 44 | 16 | 20 | 36 | 56 | 3 | 0 | 3 | 3 | 2 |
| 2004–05 | Brynäs IF | SEL | 3 | 0 | 0 | 0 | 0 | — | — | — | — | — |
| 2005–06 | Brynäs IF | SEL | 50 | 6 | 6 | 12 | 42 | 4 | 0 | 1 | 1 | 4 |
| 2006–07 | Brynäs IF | SEL | 46 | 4 | 7 | 11 | 30 | 7 | 2 | 0 | 2 | 6 |
| 2007–08 | Springfield Falcons | AHL | 37 | 2 | 2 | 4 | 18 | — | — | — | — | — |
| 2007–08 | Stockton Thunder | ECHL | 27 | 7 | 10 | 17 | 22 | — | — | — | — | — |
| 2008–09 | Luleå HF | SEL | 53 | 6 | 10 | 16 | 38 | 5 | 0 | 1 | 1 | 6 |
| 2009–10 | Södertälje SK | SEL | 54 | 13 | 19 | 32 | 36 | — | — | — | — | — |
| 2010–11 | Södertälje SK | SEL | 54 | 5 | 22 | 27 | 56 | — | — | — | — | — |
| 2011–12 | Djurgårdens IF | SEL | 50 | 6 | 6 | 12 | 18 | — | — | — | — | — |
| 2012–13 | Linköpings HC | SEL | 53 | 6 | 8 | 14 | 20 | 10 | 0 | 3 | 3 | 4 |
| 2013–14 | Linköpings HC | SHL | 49 | 8 | 13 | 21 | 30 | 14 | 2 | 4 | 6 | 6 |
| 2014–15 | Linköpings HC | SHL | 51 | 3 | 12 | 15 | 24 | 10 | 0 | 1 | 1 | 0 |
| 2015–16 | Graz 99ers | AUT | 39 | 6 | 6 | 12 | 16 | — | — | — | — | — |
| 2015–16 | AIK | Allsv | 9 | 2 | 1 | 3 | 6 | 10 | 2 | 1 | 3 | 4 |
| 2016–17 | AIK | Allsv | 52 | 4 | 14 | 18 | 28 | 8 | 4 | 1 | 5 | 8 |
| 2017–18 | AIK | Allsv | 24 | 1 | 5 | 6 | 6 | — | — | — | — | — |
| SEL/SHL totals | | | 514 | 58 | 104 | 162 | 320 | 53 | 4 | 10 | 14 | 26 |
| Allsv totals | | | 173 | 37 | 53 | 90 | 210 | 21 | 6 | 5 | 11 | 14 |

=== International ===
| Year | Team | Event | GP | G | A | Pts | PIM |
|---|---|---|---|---|---|---|---|
| 2001 | Sweden | WJC18 | 6 | 1 | 2 | 3 | 2 |
| 2003 | Sweden | WJC | 6 | 0 | 0 | 0 | 4 |
| Junior totals | | | 12 | 1 | 2 | 3 | 6 |
