= Victor Öhman (ice hockey, born 1992) =

Swedish ice hockey player

- Born: April 7, 1992 (age 33) Malmö, Sweden
- Height: 6 ft 1 in (185 cm)
- Weight: 187 lb (85 kg; 13 st 5 lb)
- Position: Left winger
- Shoots: Left
- HockeyAllsvenskan team Former teams: Västerviks IK; Malmö Redhawks; IK Oskarshamn; Aalborg Pirates; Herning Blue Fox; IF Sundsvall Hockey; Kristianstads IK
- Playing career: 2008–present

Peter Victor Öhman (born April 7, 1992) is a Swedish professional ice hockey player currently with Västerviks IK of the HockeyAllsvenskan. He formerly a left winger for Malmö Redhawks in HockeyAllsvenskan and J20 SuperElit.

Ohman joined Herning from Linköpings HC of the Swedish Hockey League on June 6, 2014, after he was initially loaned to rival Danish club, Aalborg Pirates for the previous season.
