= Edwin Hedberg =

Swedish ice hockey player

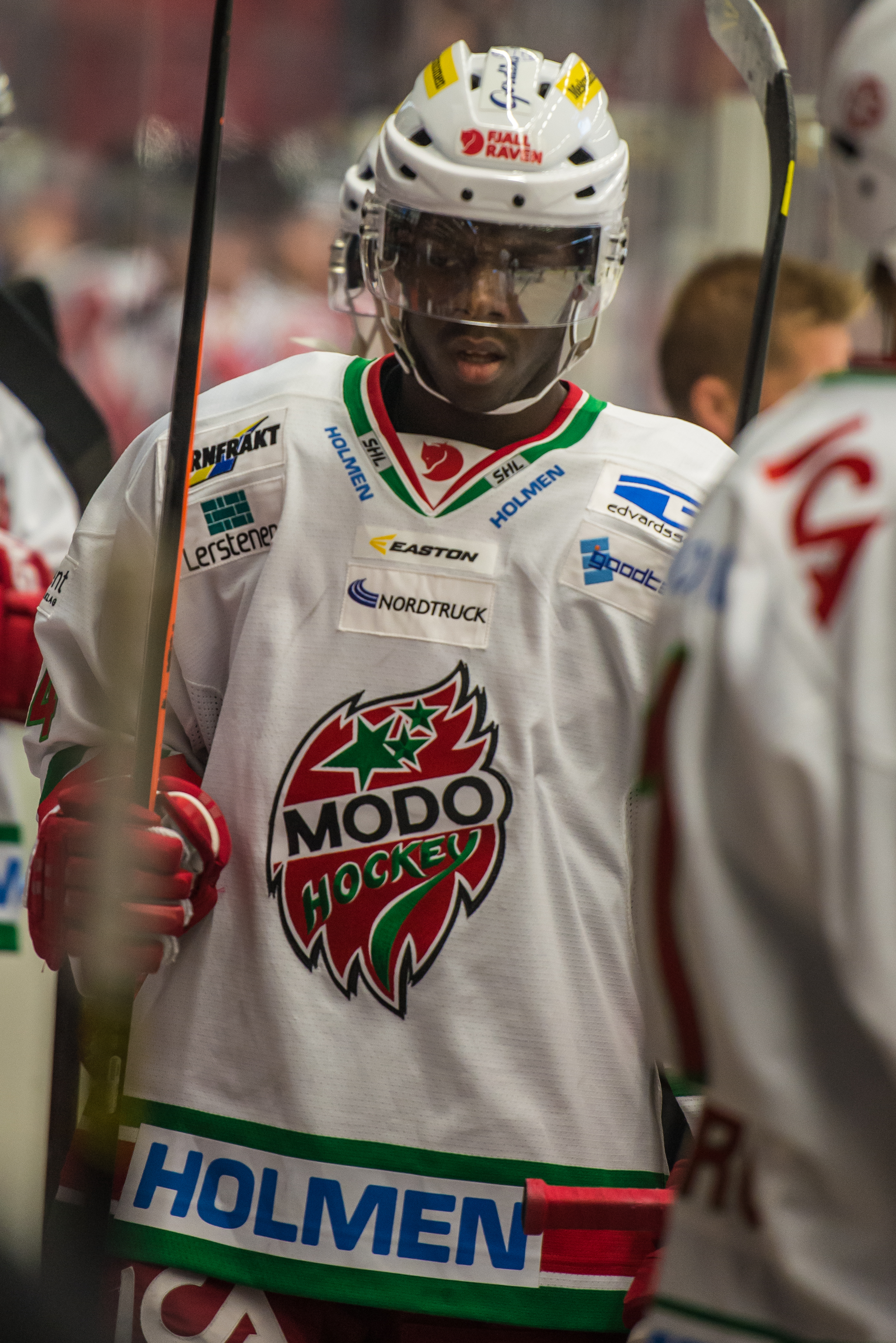
- Edwin Hedberg 2013
- Born: January 29, 1994 (age 32) Medellín, Colombia
- Height: 5 ft 11 in (180 cm)
- Weight: 172 lb (78 kg; 12 st 4 lb)
- Position: Winger
- Shoots: Left
- Hockeytrean team Former teams: Järpens IF; Modo Hockey; KHL Medveščak Zagreb; Rögle BK; Skellefteå AIK; Ässät; HC Litvinov; Modo Hockey; Östersunds IK; Nottingham Panthers
- National team: Sweden
- Playing career: 2013–present

Edwin Hedberg (born November 11, 1994) is a Colombian-born Swedish ice hockey winger. He is currently playing for Järpens IF of the Hockeytrean, the fifth tier of men's ice hockey in Sweden.

== Playing career ==
Hedberg made his Elitserien (now the SHL) debut playing with Modo Hockey during the 2012–13 Elitserien season.

On April 29, 2014, the Swedish Sports Confederation (RF) informed that Hedberg had tested positive for the banned substance sibutramine in February. Hedberg voluntarily suspended himself for the duration of the investigation. On July 9, 2014, the RF handed Hedberg a six-month suspension from all organised sporting activity; the suspension ended on October 24, 2014.

On 13 January 2016, Russian fans threw two bananas on the ice after HC Spartak Moscow lost 4:1 in a KHL match at home to Medveščak Zagreb, for which the apparent target, Edwin Hedberg, played. Hedberg himself admitted he encountered it for the first time, adding that "things like this shouldn't happen but unfortunately they do", while his head coach, Gordie Dwyer, said that he was upset with the fans' behavior, and "this obviously has no place in sport".

Later on, Spartak Moscow had issued an official apology to both Medveščak and Hedberg, affirming that video cameras at Sokolniki Arena had helped identify two offenders who would be banned from attending hockey games. The cameras also recorded the hooting from the stands during an episode with Hedberg in the 35th minute of the match. The Kontinental Hockey League had fined Spartak Moscow 700,000 rubles ($9,135) for the racist incident and "seriously warned" about the future conduct of their fans, adding that "breaches linked to the incitement of racial, ethnic, or international discord are unacceptable".
