= Daniel Olsson-Trkulja =

Swedish ice hockey player

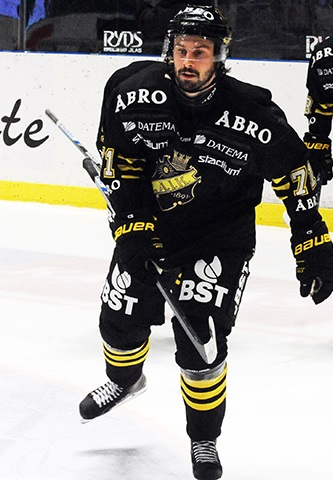
- Born: March 3, 1991 (age 34) Stockholm, Sweden
- Height: 6 ft 0 in (183 cm)
- Weight: 183 lb (83 kg; 13 st 1 lb)
- Position: Centre
- Shoots: Right
- Metal team Former teams: Frederikshavn White Hawks; AIK IF; Linköpings HC; Leksands IF; Sparta Warriors
- Playing career: 2011–present

Daniel Olsson-Trkulja (born March 3, 1991) is a Swedish professional ice hockey player currently under contract to Frederikshavn White Hawks in the Metal Ligaen (DEN).

He originally played with AIK IF in the Elitserien during the 2010–11 Elitserien season.

After two seasons with Linköpings HC, Olsson-Trkulja left as a free agent following the 2018–19 campaign to sign a two-year contract to continue in the SHL with newly promoted Leksands IF on 11 April 2019.
