= Alexander Ytterell =

Swedish ice hockey player

- Born: July 1, 1991 (age 34) Vetlanda, Sweden
- Height: 6 ft 0 in (183 cm)
- Weight: 185 lb (84 kg; 13 st 3 lb)
- Position: Defence
- Shoots: Right
- Allsv team Former teams: Djurgårdens IF; Södertälje SK; Frederikshavn White Hawks; Leksands IF; HV71; Tappara; KooKoo
- Playing career: 2011–present

Alexander Ytterell (born July 1, 1991) is a Swedish professional ice-hockey player currently playing with Djurgårdens IF in the HockeyAllsvenskan (Allsv).

He played with Södertälje SK in the Elitserien during the 2010–11 Elitserien season. He later signed a two-year contract with HV71 in the SHL on May 12, 2017.
