= Mikael Eriksson (footballer) =

Swedish footballer

Personal information
- Date of birth: 19 January 1978 (age 47)
- Height: 1.78 m (5 ft 10 in)
- Position: Midfielder

Senior career*
Years	Team	Apps	(Gls)
- Degerfors IF
- Jönköpings Södra IF
- * Club domestic league appearances and goals

Mikael Eriksson is a Swedish footballer currently playing for Jönköpings Södra IF in the Swedish Superettan. He has previously played for Degerfors IF.

In mid-2007, there was speculation in the Australian media that Eriksson was the target of Sydney FC manager Branko Culina, but nothing came of it.
