= Johan Olofsson (ice hockey) =

Swedish ice hockey player

- Born: May 9, 1994 (age 31) Arvika, Sweden
- Height: 5 ft 9 in (175 cm)
- Weight: 163 lb (74 kg; 11 st 9 lb)
- Position: Right wing
- Shoots: Right
- Liiga team Former teams: Ässät Pori; Färjestad BK; Leksands IF; Malmö Redhawks
- Playing career: 2012–present

Johan Olofsson (born May 9, 1994) is a Swedish professional ice hockey player who is currently playing for HC Ässät Pori in the Liiga. He made his Elitserien debut playing with Färjestad BK during the 2012–13 Elitserien season.

He played with Malmö Redhawks for 8 seasons in the Swedish Hockey League (SHL), before leaving to sign a one-year contract with Finnish club, Ässät Pori of the Liiga, for the 2025–26 season on 24 July 2025.

== Career statistics ==
| | | | Regular season | | | | | Playoffs |
| Season | Team | League | GP | G | A | Pts | PIM | GP | G | A | Pts | PIM |
|---|---|---|---|---|---|---|---|---|---|---|---|---|
| 2011-12 | Färjestad BK | J20 | 43 | 16 | 13 | 29 | 39 | 6 | 3 | 1 | 4 | 2 |
| 2012-13 | Färjestad BK | J20 | 41 | 17 | 14 | 31 | 20 | 7 | 1 | 2 | 3 | 2 |
| 2012-13 | Färjestad BK | SEL | 9 | 0 | 0 | 0 | 2 | 1 | 0 | 0 | 0 | 0 |
| 2013-14 | Färjestad BK | J20 | 36 | 21 | 21 | 42 | 20 | 6 | 0 | 4 | 4 | 6 |
| 2013-14 | Färjestad BK | SHL | 8 | 0 | 1 | 1 | 2 | 1 | 0 | 0 | 0 | 0 |
| 2014-15 | Färjestad BK | J20 | 3 | 3 | 1 | 4 | 2 | — | — | — | — | — |
| 2014-15 | Färjestad BK | SHL | 51 | 0 | 2 | 2 | 2 | 3 | 0 | 0 | 0 | 0 |
| 2014–15 | AIK | Allsv | 2 | 0 | 0 | 0 | 0 | — | — | — | — | — |
| 2015–16 | Färjestad BK | SHL | 40 | 3 | 4 | 7 | 6 | 2 | 0 | 0 | 0 | 0 |
| 2015–16 | Leksands IF | Allsv | 7 | 2 | 8 | 10 | 0 | 9 | 5 | 2 | 7 | 4 |
| 2016–17 | Leksands IF | SHL | 50 | 9 | 7 | 16 | 12 | — | — | — | — | — |
| 2017–18 | Malmö Redhawks | SHL | 51 | 13 | 11 | 24 | 16 | 10 | 2 | 2 | 4 | 0 |
| 2018–19 | Malmö Redhawks | SHL | 50 | 11 | 8 | 19 | 4 | 5 | 1 | 0 | 1 | 2 |
| 2019–20 | Malmö Redhawks | SHL | 49 | 11 | 6 | 17 | 33 | — | — | — | — | — |
| 2020–21 | Malmö Redhawks | SHL | 52 | 8 | 8 | 16 | 10 | 2 | 0 | 0 | 0 | 0 |
| 2021–22 | Malmö Redhawks | SHL | 52 | 2 | 10 | 12 | 6 | — | — | — | — | — |
| 2022–23 | Malmö Redhawks | SHL | 48 | 7 | 8 | 15 | 4 | — | — | — | — | — |
| 2023–24 | Malmö Redhawks | SHL | 52 | 8 | 15 | 23 | 12 | — | — | — | — | — |
| 2024–25 | Malmö Redhawks | SHL | 49 | 9 | 10 | 19 | 16 | 2 | 0 | 0 | 0 | 0 |
| SHL totals | | | 561 | 81 | 90 | 171 | 125 | 32 | 4 | 4 | 8 | 4 |
