= Johannes Jönsson =

Swedish ice hockey player

- Born: June 11, 1989 (age 36) Kalmar, Sweden
- Height: 6 ft 1 in (185 cm)
- Weight: 194 lb (88 kg; 13 st 12 lb)
- Position: Goaltender
- Catches: Left
- Allsv team Former teams: AIK IF; Örebro HK; Karlskrona HK
- Playing career: 2013–present

Johannes Jönsson (born June 11, 1989) is a Swedish professional ice hockey goaltender. He is currently playing with AIK IF of the HockeyAllsvenskan (Allsv).

Jönsson made his European Elite debut playing with Örebro HK during the 2013 Kvalserien.
