= Simo-Pekka Riikola =

Finnish ice hockey player

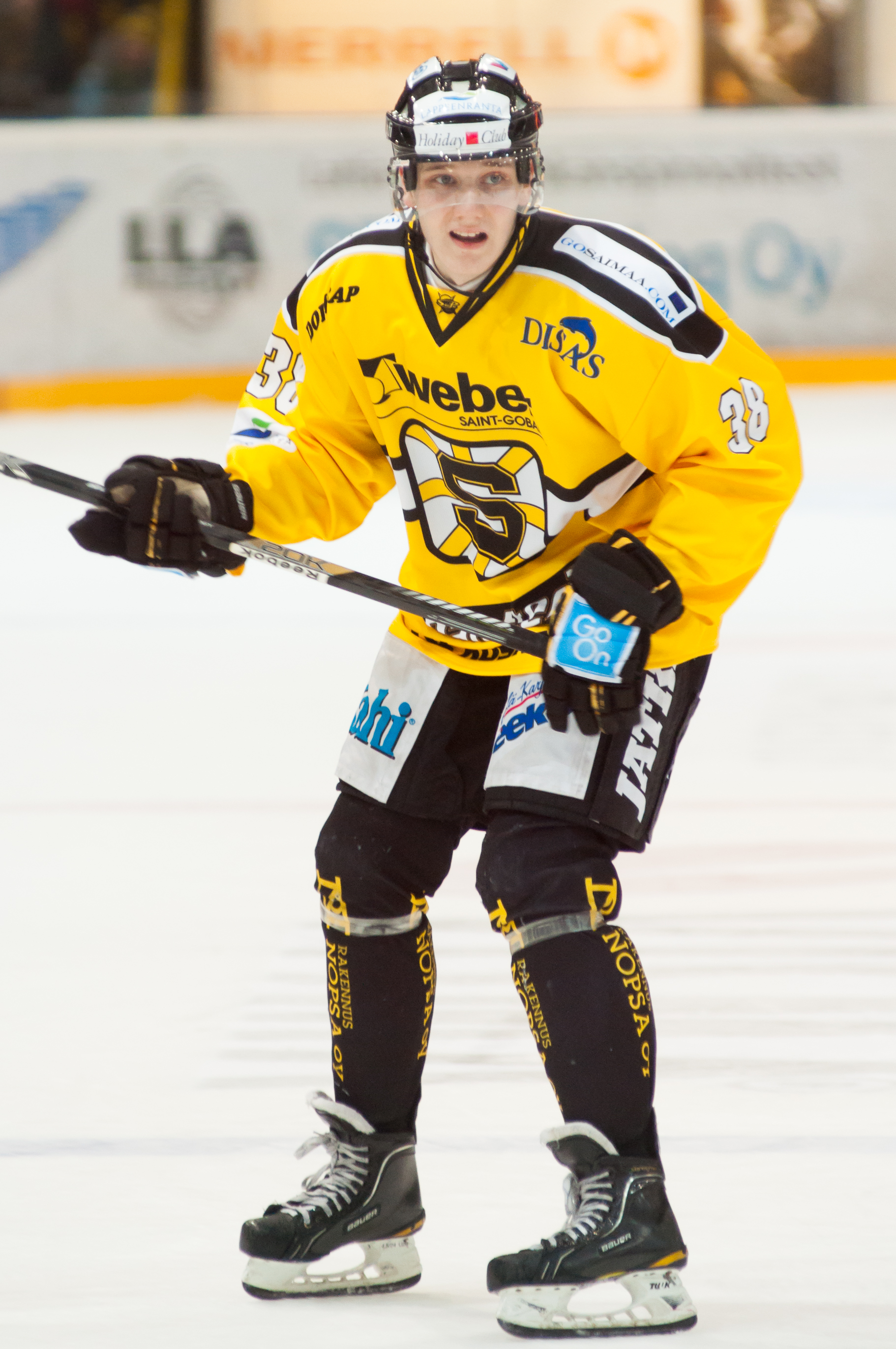
- Born: 3 February 1992 (age 33); Joensuu, Finland
- Height: 6 ft 1 in (185 cm)
- Weight: 198 lb (90 kg; 14 st 2 lb)
- Position: Defence
- Shot: Right
- Played for: Liiga: KalPa; HC TPS; Lukko; SaiPa; Metal Ligaen: Herning Blue Fox; Mestis: SaPKo; KeuPa HT
- Playing career: 2010–2023

Simo-Pekka Riikola (born 3 February 1992) is a retired Finnish professional ice hockey defenceman who played for many teams of the Finnish Liiga and for the Herning Blue Fox in Danish Metal Ligaen. His brother Juuso also played professionally.

He retired in January 2023 due to a serious knee injury.
