= Mikael Eriksson (ice hockey) =

Swedish ice hockey player

- Born: January 3, 1987 (age 39) Karlskoga, Sweden
- Height: 6 ft 2 in (188 cm)
- Weight: 209 lb (95 kg; 14 st 13 lb)
- Position: Forward
- Shoots: Left
- SEL team Former teams: Växjö Lakers; HockeyAllsvenskan; Bofors IK
- Playing career: 2011–present

Thorbjörn Mikael Eriksson (born January 3, 1987) is a Swedish professional ice hockey forward, currently playing with Växjö Lakers Hockey in the Swedish Elitserien (SEL).

Eriksson was born and raised in Karlskoga, Sweden, with Bofors HC as his youth team. After scoring 13 goals and 35 points with Karlskoga HC in the 2005–06 Swedish Division 2 season, Eriksson signed with the Division 1 team Grums IK for the 2006–07 season, where he scored 12 points in 26 games. During the season he was also called up to the senior Bofors IK team of the second tier HockeyAllsvenskan on 17 occasions, but he only scored 3 points.

After 14 goals and 29 points in 162 HockeyAllsvenskan games, Eriksson signed a two-year contract with Växjö Lakers Hockey who were newcomers of the Swedish top tier league Elitserien (SEL) in the 2011–12 season. He made his Elitserien debut on September 13, 2011, in the Lakers' premier game of the season against Frölunda HC. Eriksson did not score any points as Frölunda shutout the Lakers 2–0.
