= Jon Knuts =

Swedish ice hockey player (born 1991)

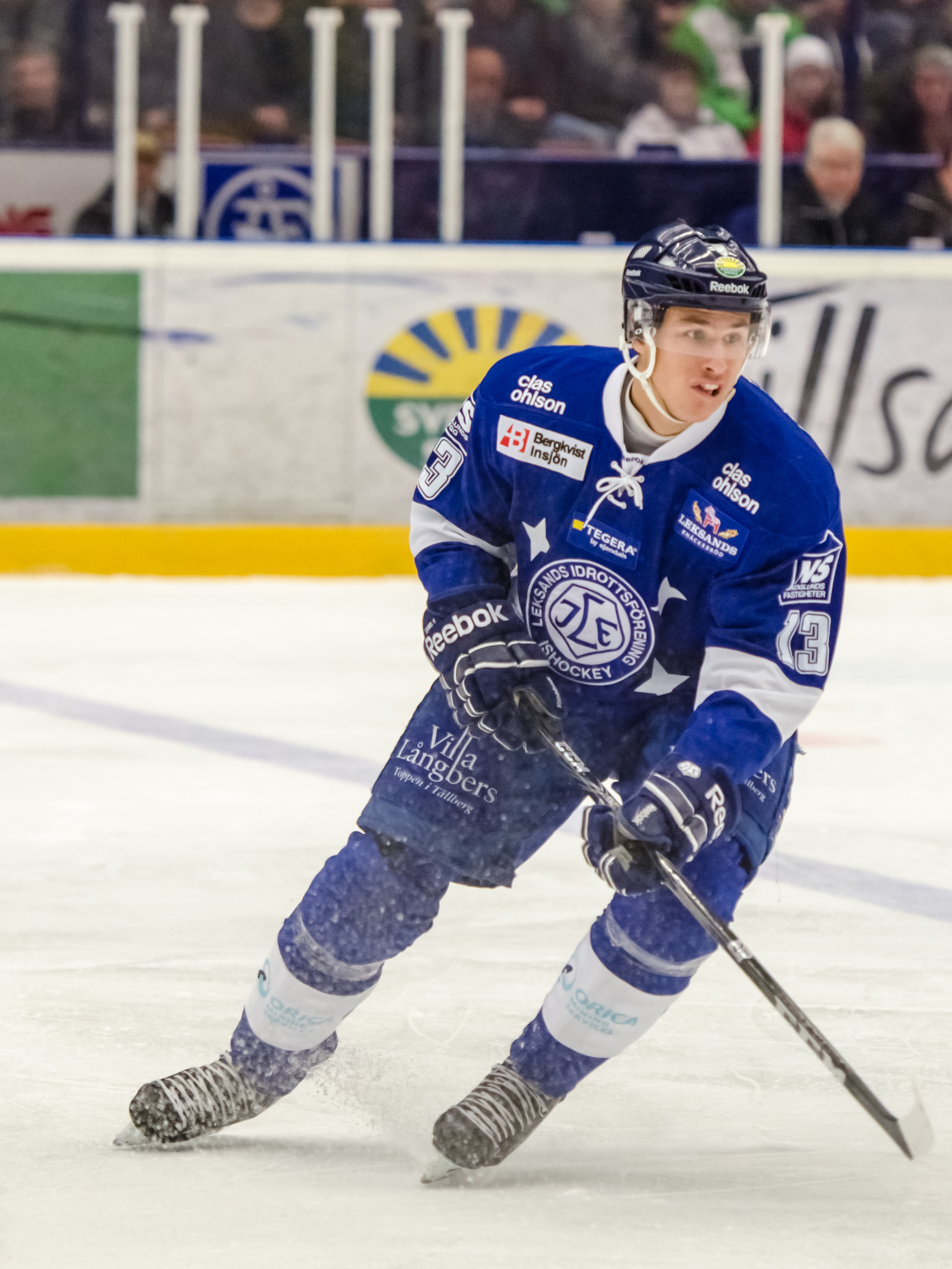
- Born: February 4, 1991 (age 34) Malung, Sweden
- Height: 6 ft 1 in (185 cm)
- Weight: 194 lb (88 kg; 13 st 12 lb)
- Position: Forward
- Shoots: Left
- SHL team: Leksands IF
- Playing career: 2010–present

Jon Knuts (born February 4, 1991) is a Swedish professional ice hockey player. He is currently playing with Leksands IF in the Swedish Hockey League (SHL).

Knuts made his Swedish Hockey League debut playing with Leksands IF during the 2013–14 SHL season.
