= Juuso Riikola =

Finnish ice hockey player

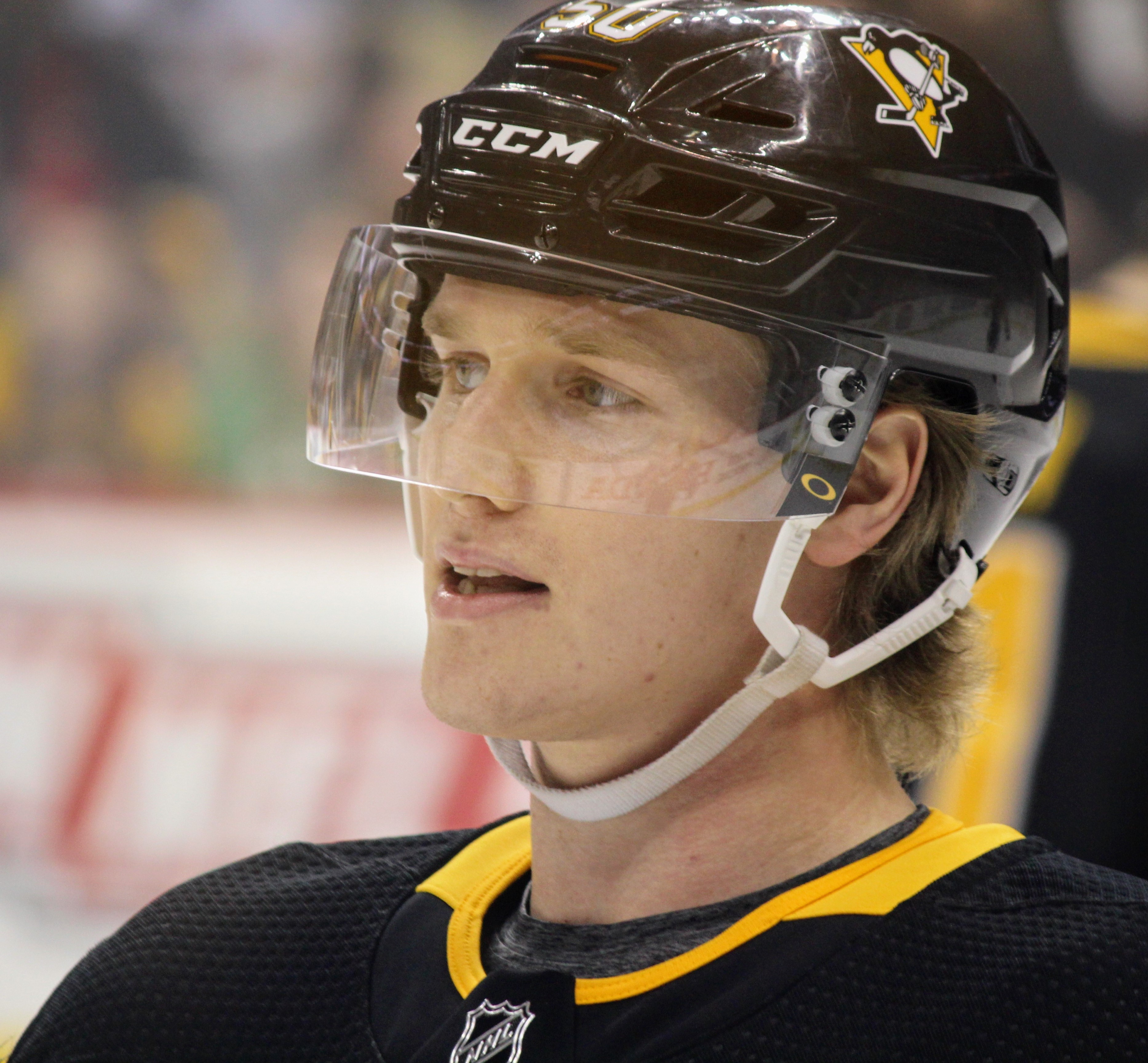
- Riikola with the Pittsburgh Penguins in 2019
- Born: 9 November 1993 (age 32) Joensuu, Finland
- Height: 6 ft 0 in (183 cm)
- Weight: 189 lb (86 kg; 13 st 7 lb)
- Position: Defence
- Shoots: Left
- NL team Former teams: SCL Tigers; KalPa; Pittsburgh Penguins; IK Oskarshamn
- National team: Finland
- NHL draft: Undrafted
- Playing career: 2012–present

Juuso Riikola (born 9 November 1993) is a Finnish professional ice hockey defenseman currently playing with SCL Tigers of the National League (NL). His brother, Simo-Pekka, also played professionally.

== Playing career ==
Riikola made his SM-liiga debut playing with KalPa as a 19-year-old during the 2012–13 SM-liiga season. He dressed for 20 games while posting 6 assists from the blueline.

In his sixth season with KalPa in 2017–18, and while serving as an alternate captain, Riikola scored a career high 8 goals for 24 points in 59 games.

On 17 May 2018, as an undrafted free agent, Riikola signed a one-year, entry-level deal with the Pittsburgh Penguins of the NHL for a reported $925,000. He made his NHL debut on 11 October 2018 against the Vegas Golden Knights at PPG Paints Arena. Riikola recorded his first career NHL point, an assist, on 28 November against the Colorado Avalanche. He scored his first NHL goal on 29 December 2018 against the St. Louis Blues.

On 30 May 2019, the Penguins re-signed Riikola to a one-year, one-way contract extension worth $850,000. On 16 October 2019, against the Colorado Avalanche, Riikola played as a left winger due to injuries to several Penguins forwards.

On 5 September 2020, the Penguins signed Riikola to a two-year, $2.3 million extension.

After four seasons within the Penguins organization and as a pending free agent, Riikola opted to return to Europe to secure a one-year contract with Swedish club, IK Oskarshamn of the SHL, on 25 May 2022.

== International play ==
Riikola played for the Finland national team at the 2018 IIHF World Championship.

== Career statistics ==
=== Regular season and playoffs ===
			Regular season					Playoffs
Season	Team	League	GP	G	A	Pts	PIM	GP	G	A	Pts	PIM
2010–11	KalPa	Jr. A	28	3	7	10	24	—	—	—	—	—
2011–12	KalPa	Jr. A	37	4	9	13	65	8	2	1	3	6
2012–13	KalPa	Jr. A	14	2	3	5	12	—	—	—	—	—
2012–13	KalPa	SM-l	20	0	6	6	6	—	—	—	—	—
2013–14	KalPa	Liiga	54	1	4	5	28	—	—	—	—	—
2013–14	KalPa	Jr. A	6	0	2	2	10	—	—	—	—	—
2014–15	KalPa	Liiga	40	6	8	14	24	4	1	0	1	25
2014–15	KalPa	Jr. A	1	0	0	0	2	—	—	—	—	—
2015–16	KalPa	Liiga	51	5	10	15	24	3	0	1	1	2
2016–17	KalPa	Liiga	59	6	19	25	28	18	1	6	7	4
2017–18	KalPa	Liiga	59	8	16	24	14	6	0	1	1	4
2018–19	Pittsburgh Penguins	NHL	37	2	3	5	10	—	—	—	—	—
2018–19	Wilkes-Barre/Scranton Penguins	AHL	5	0	2	2	0	—	—	—	—	—
2019–20	Pittsburgh Penguins	NHL	36	1	6	7	6	—	—	—	—	—
2020–21	Pittsburgh Penguins	NHL	2	0	0	0	0	—	—	—	—	—
2021–22	Wilkes-Barre/Scranton Penguins	AHL	53	1	34	35	24	6	0	0	0	0
2021–22	Pittsburgh Penguins	NHL	5	0	1	1	2	—	—	—	—	—
2022–23	IK Oskarshamn	SHL	42	2	17	19	16	2	0	0	0	0
2023–24	SCL Tigers	NL	43	3	14	17	20	—	—	—	—	—
Liiga totals			283	26	63	89	124	31	2	8	10	35
NHL totals			80	3	10	13	18	—	—	—	—	—

=== International ===
Year	Team	Event	Result	GP	G	A	Pts	PIM
2013	Finland	WJC	7th	6	0	1	1	4
2018	Finland	WC	5th	8	0	2	2	4
2024	Finland	WC	8th	8	1	1	2	4
Junior totals				6	0	1	1	4
Senior totals				16	1	3	4	8
