= Almen Bibic =

Swedish ice hockey player

- Born: March 29, 1993 (age 32) Örnsköldsvik, Sweden
- Height: 6 ft 2 in (188 cm)
- Weight: 212 lb (96 kg; 15 st 2 lb)
- Position: Defence
- Shot: Left
- Played for: Leksands IF; Rögle BK; Linköpings HC
- Playing career: 2013–2019

Almen Bibic (born March 29, 1993) is a Swedish professional ice hockey defenceman. He is currently playing with Linköpings HC of the Swedish Hockey League (SHL).

Bibic made his Swedish Hockey League debut playing with Leksands IF during the 2013–14 SHL season.

== Career statistics ==
			Regular season					Playoffs
Season	Team	League	GP	G	A	Pts	PIM	GP	G	A	Pts	PIM
2008–09	Leksands IF U16	U16 SM	8	2	2	4	2	—	—	—	—	—
2008–09	Leksands IF J18 2	J18 Div.1	17	3	4	7	45	—	—	—	—	—
2009–10	Leksands IF J18	J18 Elit	16	4	7	11	24	—	—	—	—	—
2009–10	Leksands IF J18	J18 Allsvenskan	9	0	0	0	33	4	0	0	0	2
2010–11	Leksands IF J18	J18 Allsvenskan	16	3	4	7	14	6	0	0	0	0
2011–12	Leksands IF J20	J20 SuperElit	40	4	11	15	127	2	0	0	0	0
2012–13	Leksands IF J20	J20 SuperElit	44	3	6	9	86	1	0	0	0	2
2012–13	Leksands IF	HockeyAllsvenskan	1	0	0	0	0	4	0	1	1	2
2013–14	Leksands IF	SHL	11	0	1	1	0	—	—	—	—	—
2013–14	Rögle BK	HockeyAllsvenskan	35	0	2	2	70	16	0	2	2	4
2014–15	Rögle BK	HockeyAllsvenskan	52	0	6	6	42	10	0	2	2	6
2015–16	Rögle BK	SHL	45	2	8	10	61	—	—	—	—	—
2016–17	Rögle BK	SHL	43	2	0	2	69	—	—	—	—	—
2017–18	Rögle BK	SHL	18	0	1	1	20	—	—	—	—	—
2017–18	Linköping HC	SHL	24	3	3	6	14	7	0	1	1	4
2018–19	Linköping HC	SHL	22	1	2	3	18	—	—	—	—	—
SHL totals			163	8	15	23	182	7	0	1	1	4
HockeyAllsvenskan totals			88	0	8	8	112	30	0	5	5	12
