= Atte Engren =

Finnish ice hockey player (born 1988)

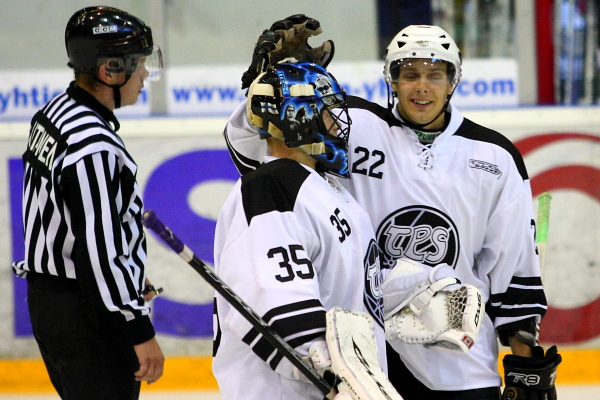
- Engren with TPS in 2009
- Born: 19 February 1988 (age 38) Rauma, Finland
- Height: 6 ft 1 in (185 cm)
- Weight: 185 lb (84 kg; 13 st 3 lb)
- Position: Goaltender
- Caught: Left
- Played for: Lukko; TPS; Milwaukee Admirals; HC Lev Praha; Atlant Moscow Oblast; HC Spartak Moscow; Leksands IF; HIFK
- Current coach: Lukko U18
- National team: Finland
- NHL draft: 204th overall, 2007; Nashville Predators
- Playing career: 2007–2020
- Coaching career: 2022–present

Atte Engren (born 19 February 1988) is a retired Finnish professional ice hockey goaltender. He currently works as the goaltending coach for Lukko U18, a team competing in Finland's top under-18 junior league, the U18 SM-sarja.

== Playing career ==
Early in his career, Engren played for his hometown team, Lukko, before making the move to TPS Turku in 2008. A hybrid butterfly goaltender, he was chosen by the Nashville Predators in the seventh round, 204th overall, of the 2007 NHL entry draft. After helping TPS capture the Finnish championship in 2010, Engren signed a two-year entry-level deal with the Predators on May 28, 2010. While in North America, he didn't see NHL action but did suit up for the Milwaukee Admirals in the AHL, appearing in 27 games over the 2010–11 and 2011–12 seasons. He returned to Finland for the 2012–13 campaign with TPS and later expanded his career to the Kontinental Hockey League (KHL), signing with HC Lev Praha on May 8, 2013.

On July 2, 2014, after Lev Praha declared bankruptcy and ceased operations, Engren became an unrestricted free agent. Shortly afterward, he signed a contract with Atlant Moscow Oblast, remaining in the Kontinental Hockey League (KHL) for the 2014–15 season. The following year, for the 2015–16 season, Engren stayed in the KHL but moved to HC Spartak Moscow. After two consecutive seasons in Russia, Engren opted to continue his career in Sweden, joining Leksands IF of the Swedish Hockey League (SHL) in June 2016.

== International play ==
Engren was selected to represent the Finnish national ice hockey team at the 2015 IIHF World Championship.
