= Emil Kruse =

Swedish ice hockey player

- Born: March 21, 1995 (age 30) Karlstad, Sweden
- Height: 6 ft 2 in (188 cm)
- Weight: 198 lb (90 kg; 14 st 2 lb)
- Position: Goaltender
- Catches: Left
- EIHL team Former teams: Dundee Stars; Västerås IK; Brynäs IF; Rögle BK; IK Oskarshamn
- NHL draft: Undrafted
- Playing career: 2013–present

Emil Kruse (born March 21, 1995) is a Swedish professional ice hockey goaltender. He is currently playing with Dundee Stars in the UK's Elite Ice Hockey League (EIHL). Kruse was previously with IK Oskarshamn in the Swedish Allsvenskan.

Kruse made his Swedish Hockey League debut playing with Brynäs IF during the 2014–15 SHL season.
