= 2018–19 HockeyAllsvenskan season =

- League: HockeyAllsvenskan
- Sport: Ice hockey
- Duration: September 2018 – March 2019 (regular season)
- Number of teams: 14
- Average attendance: 2,713 (regular season)
- TV partner(s): C More
- First place: AIK
- Top scorer: Nicolai Meyer (SSK)
- Promoted to SHL: Leksands IF; IK Oskarshamn
- Relegated to Hockeyettan: IK Pantern

HockeyAllsvenskan seasons
- ← 2017–18 2019–20 →

The 2018–19 HockeyAllsvenskan season is the 14th season that the second tier of Swedish ice hockey has operated under that name. The series consists of 14 teams playing a regular season in which each team plays each other team four times, twice at home and twice away. This is followed by a series of promotion and relegation tournaments, with the teams finishing first through eight participating in promotion playoffs, and the teams finishing 13th and 14th forced to requalify to avoid relegation to the Hockeyettan.

== Participating teams ==
HockeyAllsvenskan team map

Team	City	Arena	Capacity
AIK	Stockholm	Hovet	8,094
Almtuna IS	Uppsala	Gränby Ishall	2,800
IF Björklöven	Umeå	A3 Arena	5,400
BIK Karlskoga	Karlskoga	Nobelhallen	6,300
Karlskrona HK	Karlskrona	NKT Arena Karlskrona	5,050
Leksands IF	Leksand	Tegera Arena	7,650
Modo Hockey	Örnsköldsvik	Fjällräven Center	7,600
IK Oskarshamn	Oskarshamn	Be-Ge Hockey Center	3,346
IK Pantern	Malmö	Malmö Isstadion	5,800
Södertälje SK	Södertälje	AXA Sports Center	6,200
Tingsryds AIF	Tingsryd	Nelson Garden Arena	3,400
HC Vita Hästen	Norrköping	Himmelstalundshallen	4,280
Västerviks IK	Västervik	Plivit Trade-hallen	2,500
VIK Västerås HK	Västerås	ABB Arena Nord	4,902

== Regular season ==
=== Standings ===
Pos	Team	Pld	W	OTW	OTL	L	GF	GA	GD	Pts	Qualification or relegation
1	AIK	52	30	5	9	8	172	116	+56	109	Advance to the HockeyAllsvenskan finals
2	IK Oskarshamn	52	28	5	4	15	158	103	+55	98	Advance to the HockeyAllsvenskan finals
3	Västerås HK	52	26	6	3	17	155	126	+29	93	Advance to the HockeyAllsvenskan playoffs
4	Leksands IF	52	25	5	5	17	145	128	+17	90	Advance to the HockeyAllsvenskan playoffs
5	BIK Karlskoga	52	23	6	6	17	146	135	+11	87	Advance to the HockeyAllsvenskan playoffs
6	Modo Hockey	52	24	4	6	18	143	134	+9	86	Advance to the HockeyAllsvenskan playoffs
7	Karlskrona HK	52	21	4	6	21	140	142	−2	77	Advance to the HockeyAllsvenskan playoffs
8	Västerviks IK	52	16	11	6	19	136	130	+6	76	Advance to the HockeyAllsvenskan playoffs
9	Södertälje SK	52	19	6	4	23	143	151	−8	73	
10	IF Björklöven	52	16	6	8	22	122	146	−24	68	
11	IK Pantern	52	16	6	5	25	116	159	−43	65	
12	Tingsryds AIF	52	15	4	8	25	116	146	−30	61	
13	Almtuna IS	52	15	7	2	28	128	160	−32	61	Advance to the HockeyAllsvenskan qualifiers
14	HC Vita Hästen	52	10	5	8	29	103	147	−44	48	Advance to the HockeyAllsvenskan qualifiers

Updated to match(es) played on 8 March 2019. Source:
- Note: IK Pantern decided to withdraw from the league on 31 May 2019, due to financial problems.

== Post-season ==
=== Finals ===
The top two teams from the regular season will meet in a best-of-five tournament, with the winner advancing directly to the SHL qualifiers, and the losing team forced to play an additional playoff.

==== AIK vs. IK Oskarshamn ====
11 March	AIK	5–1	IK Oskarshamn	Hovet	Recap
No scoring		First period	No scoring
Garry Nunn 1 – 1:06; Garry Nunn 2 – 3:49; Sam Marklund 1 – 6:28; Garry Nunn 3 – 15:35; Éric Castonguay 1 – pp – 18:14		Second period	No scoring
No scoring		Third period	8:55 – pp – Joakim Thelin 1
Erik Källgren (27 saves / 28 shots)		Goalie stats	Adam Åhman (22 saves / 27 shots)

13 March	IK Oskarshamn	3–1	AIK	Be-Ge Hockey Center	Recap
No scoring		First period	No scoring
No scoring		Second period	5:37 – Sam Marklund 2
Joakim Hillding 1 – 6:20; Nicklas Heinerö 1 – 16:55; Joakim Hillding 2 – en – 19:35		Third period	No scoring
Christoffer Rifalk (26 saves / 27 shots)		Goalie stats	Johannes Jönsson (33 saves / 35 shots)

15 March	AIK	2–3	IK Oskarshamn	Hovet	Recap
Jesper Frödén 1 – pp2 – 15:14; Sam Marklund 3 – pp2 – 15:33		First period	4:40 – Nicklas Heinerö 2
No scoring		Second period	4:30 – pp – Joakim Hillding 2; 19:59 – Joakim Thelin 2
No scoring		Third period	No scoring
Johannes Jönsson (22 saves / 25 shots)		Goalie stats	Christoffer Rifalk (42 saves / 44 shots)

17 March	IK Oskarshamn	3–4	OT	AIK	Be-Ge Hockey Center	Recap
No scoring		First period		0:55 – Jesper Frödén 2
Joakim Thelin 3 – pp – 6:11; Robin Söderqvist 1 – 10:10		Second period		17:36 – Christian Sandberg 1
Alex Hutchings 1 – pp – 12:02		Third period		8:50 – Jacob Dahlström 1
No scoring		First overtime period		2:37 – Jesper Frödén 3
Christoffer Rifalk (25 saves / 29 shots)		Goalie stats		Johannes Jönsson (20 saves / 23 shots)

19 March	AIK	1–4	IK Oskarshamn	Hovet	Recap
No scoring		First period	No scoring
No scoring		Second period	0:19 – sh – Filiph Engsund 1; 12:56 – John Dahlström 1
Oscar Nord 1 – 18:49		Third period	5:30 – sh – John Dahlström 2; 17:41 – en – Jonas Engström 1
Johannes Jönsson (21 saves / 25 shots)		Goalie stats	Christoffer Rifalk (37 saves / 38 shots)

IK Oskarshamn won series 3–2

=== HockeyAllsvenskan playoffs ===
Teams 3–8 from the regular season will play a single round-robin tournament, with teams 3–5 getting home-ice advantage. The season is then over for all but the winning team, which advances to the meet the loser of the HockeyAllsvenskan finals in a playoff to the SHL qualifiers. Teams also started with bonus points based on their position in the regular season standings. Team 3 began with three points, team 4 with two points, and team 5 with one point.

Pos	Team	Pld	W	OTW	OTL	L	GF	GA	GD	Pts	Qualification
1	Leksands IF (Q)	5	3	2	0	0	21	7	+14	15	Advance to Playoff to the SHL qualifiers
2	Västerås HK	5	3	1	0	1	14	9	+5	14	Return to HockeyAllsvenskan for the 2019–20 season
3	BIK Karlskoga	5	2	0	1	2	12	10	+2	8	Return to HockeyAllsvenskan for the 2019–20 season
4	Modo Hockey	5	2	0	1	2	13	12	+1	7	Return to HockeyAllsvenskan for the 2019–20 season
5	Västerviks IK	5	1	0	1	3	10	18	−8	4	Return to HockeyAllsvenskan for the 2019–20 season
6	Karlskrona HK	5	0	1	1	3	9	23	−14	3	Return to HockeyAllsvenskan for the 2019–20 season

Updated to match(es) played on 20 March 2019. Source:
(Q) Qualified to the phase indicated

=== Playoff to the SHL qualifiers ===
In the playoff to the SHL qualifiers (Swedish: Play Off inför direktkval till SHL), the losing team from the HockeyAllsvenskan finals will meet the winning team from the HockeyAllsvenskan playoffs in a best-of-three series. The winning team will advance to the SHL qualifiers.

==== AIK vs. Leksands IF ====
22 March	AIK	1–2	Leksands IF	Hovet	Recap
No scoring		First period	2:35 – Jon Knuts (1)
No scoring		Second period	No scoring
Mathias From (1) – 19:25		Third period	18:30 – Martin Karlsson (1; ENG)
Erik Källgren (17 saves / 18 shots)		Goalie stats	Axel Brage (36 saves / 37 shots)

24 March	Leksands IF	7–2	AIK	Tegera Arena	Recap
Daniel Gunnarsson (1; PPG) – 7:32; Martin Karlsson (2) – 12:32		First period	4:51 – Jesper Frödén (1)
Daniel Gunnarsson (2; PPG) – 7:15; David Rundqvist (1) – 10:17; Lucas Nordsäter (1) – 18:59		Second period	No scoring
Mattias Ritola (1) – 0:54; Thomas Valkvæ Olsen (1) – 1:17		Third period	10:09 – Garry Nunn (1; PPG)
Axel Brage (30 saves / 32 shots)		Goalie stats	Erik Källgren (27 saves / 34 shots)

Leksands IF won series 2–0

=== SHL qualifiers ===
Two teams from the HockeyAllsvenskan and two teams from the SHL played a best-of-seven series, with the winners qualifying for play in the 2019–20 SHL season and the losers qualifying for play in the 2019–20 HockeyAllsvenskan season. The winner of the HockeyAllsvenskan finals met team 14 from the SHL, while the winner of the playoff to the SHL qualifiers met team 13 from the SHL. Mora IK and Leksands IF faced each other for the third consecutive year, in these qualifiers.

For the first time since 2013 and for the first time since the current SHL qualifier format was introduced in 2015, both SHL teams (Timrå IK and Mora IK) failed to re-qualify for the SHL and thus were relegated. IK Oskarshamn and Leksands IF qualified for the SHL by winning their respective series. IK Oskarshamn promoted to the top-tier league for the first time in the club's history.

==== Timrå IK vs. IK Oskarshamn ====
27 March	Timrå IK	5–4	2OT	IK Oskarshamn	NHK Arena	Recap
Gustav Nielsen (1) – 8:26		First period		3:03 – Filiph Engsund (1); 9:56 – Markus Modigs (1)
Hampus Larsson (1) – 2:17		Second period		8:15 – Janne Kivilahti (1)
Marcus Hardegård (1; PPG) – 12:41; Vilmos Galló (1; EA) – 19:47		Third period		18:15 – Joakim Thelin (1)
Johannes Salmonsson (1; PPG) – 2:27		Second overtime period		No scoring
Niklas Svedberg (26 saves / 30 shots)		Goalie stats		Christoffer Rifalk (39 saves / 44 shots)

29 March	IK Oskarshamn	3–2	OT	Timrå IK	Be-Ge Hockey Center	Recap
No scoring		First period		No scoring
Joakim Hillding (1) – 3:01		Second period		No scoring
Jonas Engström (1; PPG) – 17:26		Third period		12:19 – Filip Hållander (1); 19:19 – Anton Wedin (1; EA)
Jonas Engström (2) – 7:01		First overtime period		No scoring
Christoffer Rifalk (32 saves / 34 shots)		Goalie stats		Niklas Svedberg (38 saves / 41 shots)

31 March	Timrå IK	4–3	OT	IK Oskarshamn	NHK Arena	Recap
Johannes Kinnvall (1; PPG) – 7:11		First period		3:29 – Markus Modigs (2)
Henrik Törnqvist (1; PPG) – 16:33		Second period		19:57 – Jonas Engström (3; PPG)
Filip Hållander (2) – 4:44		Third period		17:16 – Oskar Nilsson (1; EA)
Johannes Kinnvall (2; PPG) – 15:09		First overtime period		No scoring
Niklas Svedberg (29 saves / 32 shots)		Goalie stats		Christoffer Rifalk (38 saves / 42 shots)

2 April	IK Oskarshamn	5–2	Timrå IK	Be-Ge Hockey Center	Recap
No scoring		First period	No scoring
Matias Sointu (1) – 14:22		Second period	18:59 – Gustav Nielsen (2)
Matias Sointu (2) – 1:52; John Dahlström (1) – 7:17; Jonas Engström (4; PPG) – 11:18; John Dahlström (2) – 14:03		Third period	13:09 – Filip Hållander (3)
Christoffer Rifalk (21 saves / 23 shots)		Goalie stats	Niklas Svedberg (23 saves / 28 shots)

4 April	Timrå IK	4–1	IK Oskarshamn	NHK Arena	Recap
No scoring		First period	No scoring
Henrik Törnqvist (2) – 2:44; Filip Hållander (4; PPG) – 8:33		Second period	14:01 – Filiph Engsund (2)
Filip Hållander (5) – 13:28; Henrik Törnqvist (3; PPG, ENG) – 17:46		Third period	No scoring
Niklas Svedberg (22 saves / 23 shots)		Goalie stats	Christoffer Rifalk (28 saves / 31 shots)

6 April	IK Oskarshamn	5–4	OT	Timrå IK	Be-Ge Hockey Center	Recap
Joakim Hillding (2) – 10:02; Joakim Hillding (3; PPG) – 12:19		First period		No scoring
Nicklas Heinerö (1) – 11:11		Second period		0:51 – Anton Wedin (2); 17:56 – Rickard Palmberg (1)
Joakim Thelin (2) – 11:24		Third period		15:12 – Hampus Larsson (2); 19:07 – Rickard Palmberg (2; EA)
Joakim Thelin (3) – 6:06		First overtime period		No scoring
Christoffer Rifalk (33 saves / 37 shots)		Goalie stats		Niklas Svedberg (34 saves / 39 shots)

8 April	Timrå IK	0–3	IK Oskarshamn	NHK Arena	Recap
No scoring		First period	15:23 – Jonas Engström (5)
No scoring		Second period	No scoring
No scoring		Third period	8:58 – Matias Sointu (3); 18:33 – John Dahlström (3; ENG)
Victor Brattström (33 saves / 35 shots)		Goalie stats	Christoffer Rifalk (42 saves / 42 shots)

IK Oskarshamn won series 4–3

==== Mora IK vs. Leksands IF ====
28 March	Mora IK	3–5	Leksands IF	Jalas Arena	Recap
No scoring		First period	4:24 – Jon Knuts (1; SHG); 19:25 – Linus Persson (1)
Sebastian Hartmann (1) – 13:36		Second period	0:34 – Daniel Gunnarsson (1); 1:37 – Anton Karlsson (1)
John Persson (1) – 7:15; Matt Bailey (1) – 11:22		Third period	19:23 – Martin Karlsson (1; ENG)
Janne Juvonen (21 saves / 25 shots)		Goalie stats	Axel Brage (35 saves / 38 shots)

30 March	Leksands IF	4–3	Mora IK	Tegera Arena	Recap
Mattias Ritola (1; PPG) – 0:58		First period	No scoring
Thomas Valkvæ Olsen (1; PS) – 4:32; Jesper Ollas (1) – 9:26		Second period	11:02 – Viktor Amnér (1); 16:03 – Jonathan Carlsson (1)
Anton Karlsson (2) – 3:37		Third period	7:40 – Ryan Johnston (1)
Axel Brage (21 saves / 24 shots)		Goalie stats	Janne Juvonen (32 saves / 36 shots)

1 April	Mora IK	5–2	Leksands IF	Jalas Arena	Recap
No scoring		First period	No scoring
Kevin Gagné (1) – 0:21; Oskar Svanlund (1) – 1:22; Mathias Bromé (1; PPG) – 5:04; Andrew Rowe (1; PPG) – 6:10		Second period	No scoring
Mathias Bromé (2; ENG) – 18:17		Third period	13:48 – David Rundqvist (1); 17:42 – Filip Johansson (1)
Christian Engstrand (24 saves / 26 shots)		Goalie stats	Axel Brage (19 saves / 22 shots); Jonas Arntzen (7 saves / 8 shots)

3 April	Leksands IF	2–1	Mora IK	Tegera Arena	Recap
No scoring		First period	No scoring
Thomas Valkvæ Olsen (2) – 4:32		Second period	6:18 – Mathias Bromé (3)
Johan Porsberger (1; PPG) – 16:51		Third period	No scoring
Axel Brage (24 saves / 25 shots)		Goalie stats	Christian Engstrand (39 saves / 41 shots)

5 April	Mora IK	2–3	OT	Leksands IF	Jalas Arena	Recap
No scoring		First period		No scoring
No scoring		Second period		13:35 – Anton Karlsson (3)
Spencer Abbott (1) – 0:30; Nils Carnbäck (1) – 15:41		Third period		12:17 – Thomas Valkvæ Olsen (3)
No scoring		First overtime period		3:08 – August Berg (1)
Christian Engstrand (30 saves / 33 shots)		Goalie stats		Axel Brage (36 saves / 38 shots)

Leksands IF won series 4–1

== HockeyAllsvenskan qualifiers ==
Teams 13 and 14 from the regular season will defend their spots in HockeyAllsvenskan in the HockeyAllsvenskan qualifiers (Swedish: Kval till HockeyAllsvenskan).

Pos	Team	Pld	W	OTW	OTL	L	GF	GA	GD	Pts	Qualification
1	HC Vita Hästen (Q)	10	7	0	0	3	30	21	+9	21	Qualify for the 2019–20 HockeyAllsvenskan season
2	Kristianstads IK (P, Q)	10	5	2	1	2	30	21	+9	20	Qualify for the 2019–20 HockeyAllsvenskan season
3	Almtuna IS	10	6	0	1	3	38	21	+17	19	Qualify for the 2019–20 Hockeyettan season
4	Tranås AIF	10	4	1	0	5	26	35	−9	14	Qualify for the 2019–20 Hockeyettan season
5	Hudiksvalls HC	10	2	2	1	5	21	28	−7	11	Qualify for the 2019–20 Hockeyettan season
6	Bodens HF	10	1	0	2	7	15	34	−19	5	Qualify for the 2019–20 Hockeyettan season

Updated to match(es) played on 14 April 2019. Source:
(P) Promoted; (Q) Qualified to the phase indicated
- Note: Almtuna IS, despite their sporting relegation, were offered and accepted IK Pantern's spot in HockeyAllsvenskan, after Pantern decided to withdraw from the league in May 2019 due to that club's financial struggles.
