= 2017–18 HockeyAllsvenskan season =

- League: HockeyAllsvenskan
- Sport: Ice hockey
- Duration: 2017–2018 (regular season)
- Number of teams: 14
- Average attendance: 2,705 (regular season)
- TV partner(s): C More
- First place: Timrå IK
- Top scorer: Emil Molin (Modo)
- Promoted to SHL: Timrå IK
- Relegated to Hockeyettan: IF Troja/Ljungby

HockeyAllsvenskan seasons
- ← 2016–17 2018–19 →

The 2017–18 HockeyAllsvenskan season is the 13th season that the second tier of Swedish ice hockey has operated under that name. The series consists of 14 teams playing a regular season in which each team plays each other team four times, twice at home and twice away. This is followed by a series of promotion and relegation tournaments, with the teams finishing first through eight participating in promotion playoffs, and the teams finishing 13th and 14th forced to requalify to avoid relegation to the Hockeyettan.

== Participating teams ==
HockeyAllsvenskan team map

| Team | City | Arena | Capacity |
|---|---|---|---|
| AIK | Stockholm | Hovet | 8,094 |
| Almtuna IS | Uppsala | Metallåtervinning Arena | 2,800 |
| IF Björklöven | Umeå | T3 Center | 5,400 |
| BIK Karlskoga | Karlskoga | Nobelhallen | 6,300 |
| Leksands IF | Leksand | Tegera Arena | 7,650 |
| Modo Hockey | Örnsköldsvik | Fjällräven Center | 7,600 |
| IK Oskarshamn | Oskarshamn | Arena Oskarshamn | 3,346 |
| IK Pantern | Malmö | Malmö Isstadion | 5,800 |
| Södertälje SK | Södertälje | AXA Sports Center | 6,200 |
| Timrå IK | Timrå | NHK Arena | 6,000 |
| Tingsryds AIF | Tingsryd | Nelson Garden Arena | 3,400 |
| IF Troja/Ljungby | Ljungby | Ljungby Arena | 3,620 |
| HC Vita Hästen | Norrköping | Himmelstalundshallen | 4,280 |
| Västerviks IK | Västervik | Plivit Trade-hallen | 2,500 |

== Regular season ==
=== Standings ===
| Pos | Team | Pld | W | OTW | OTL | L | GF | GA | GD | Pts | Qualification or relegation |
|---|---|---|---|---|---|---|---|---|---|---|---|
| 1 | Timrå IK | 52 | 26 | 7 | 7 | 12 | 134 | 99 | +35 | 99 | Advance to the HockeyAllsvenskan finals |
| 2 | Leksands IF | 52 | 26 | 3 | 7 | 16 | 147 | 114 | +33 | 91 | Advance to the HockeyAllsvenskan finals |
| 3 | AIK | 52 | 23 | 6 | 4 | 19 | 149 | 128 | +21 | 85 | Advance to the HockeyAllsvenskan playoffs |
| 4 | Almtuna IS | 52 | 21 | 6 | 7 | 18 | 135 | 143 | −8 | 82 | Advance to the HockeyAllsvenskan playoffs |
| 5 | IF Björklöven | 52 | 20 | 6 | 8 | 18 | 136 | 133 | +3 | 80 | Advance to the HockeyAllsvenskan playoffs |
| 6 | IK Pantern | 52 | 18 | 10 | 5 | 19 | 138 | 140 | −2 | 79 | Advance to the HockeyAllsvenskan playoffs |
| 7 | IK Oskarshamn | 52 | 19 | 7 | 8 | 18 | 148 | 159 | −11 | 79 | Advance to the HockeyAllsvenskan playoffs |
| 8 | Södertälje SK | 52 | 19 | 6 | 6 | 21 | 130 | 141 | −11 | 75 | Advance to the HockeyAllsvenskan playoffs |
| 9 | HC Vita Hästen | 52 | 18 | 6 | 7 | 21 | 119 | 137 | −18 | 73 | |
| 10 | Modo Hockey | 52 | 19 | 7 | 1 | 25 | 134 | 123 | +11 | 72 | |
| 11 | Tingsryds AIF | 52 | 18 | 5 | 7 | 22 | 125 | 136 | −11 | 71 | |
| 12 | BIK Karlskoga | 52 | 16 | 8 | 7 | 21 | 126 | 149 | −23 | 71 | |
| 13 | Västerviks IK | 52 | 19 | 3 | 6 | 24 | 133 | 142 | −9 | 69 | Advance to the HockeyAllsvenskan qualifiers |
| 14 | IF Troja/Ljungby | 52 | 14 | 8 | 8 | 22 | 142 | 152 | −10 | 66 | Advance to the HockeyAllsvenskan qualifiers |

Updated to match(es) played on 7 March 2018. Source:

== Post-season ==
=== Finals ===
The top two teams from the regular season will meet in a best-of-five tournament, with the winner advancing directly to the SHL qualifiers, and the losing team forced to play an additional playoff. The matches began on 9 March and finished on 13 March.

==== Timrå IK vs. Leksands IF ====
| 9 March | Timrå IK | 4–3 | OT | Leksands IF | NHK Arena | Recap |
| Filip Hållander 1 – pp – 11:18 | | First period | | 3:26 – Jon Knuts 1 |
| Jonathan Dahlén 1 – 12:09 | | Second period | | 11:34 – ps – Johan Porsberger 1 |
| Johannes Kinnvall 1 – 4:14 | | Third period | | 15:07 – Austin Madaisky 1 |
| Michael Parks 1 – 6:35 | | First overtime period | | No scoring |
| Henrik Haukeland (28 saves / 31 shots) | | Goalie stats | | Robin Rahm (27 saves / 31 shots) |

| 11 March | Leksands IF | 1–2 | Timrå IK | Tegera Arena | Recap |
| No scoring | | First period | No scoring |
| No scoring | | Second period | 11:58 – Jonathan Dahlén 2; 16:35 – Erik Karlsson 1 |
| Oskar Lang 1 – 19:55 | | Third period | No scoring |
| Robin Rahm (21 saves / 23 shots) | | Goalie stats | Henrik Haukeland (27 saves / 28 shots) |

| 13 March | Timrå IK | 4–1 | Leksands IF | NHK Arena | Recap |
| Johannes Kinnvall 2 – 3:08; Jonathan Dahlén 3 – 9:09 | | First period | No scoring |
| No scoring | | Second period | No scoring |
| Jonathan Dahlén 4 – pp – 5:04; Erik Karlsson 2 – 16:36 | | Third period | 9:31 – Filip Johansson 1 |
| Henrik Haukeland (16 saves / 17 shots) | | Goalie stats | Tex Williamsson (26 saves / 30 shots) |

| Timrå won series 3–0 |

=== HockeyAllsvenskan playoffs ===
Teams 3–8 from the regular season will play a single round-robin tournament, with teams 3–5 getting home-ice advantage. The season is then over for all but the winning team, which advances to the meet the loser of the HockeyAllsvenskan finals in a playoff to the SHL qualifiers. Teams also started with bonus points based on their position in the regular season standings. Team 3 began with three points, team 4 with two points, and team 5 with one point.

| Pos | Team | Pld | W | OTW | OTL | L | GF | GA | GD | Pts | Qualification |
|---|---|---|---|---|---|---|---|---|---|---|---|
| 1 | IK Oskarshamn (Q) | 5 | 3 | 1 | 1 | 0 | 19 | 7 | +12 | 12 | Advance to Playoff to the SHL qualifiers |
| 2 | Södertälje SK | 5 | 4 | 0 | 0 | 1 | 16 | 11 | +5 | 12 | Return to HockeyAllsvenskan for the 2018–19 season |
| 3 | IF Björklöven | 5 | 2 | 2 | 0 | 1 | 16 | 12 | +4 | 11 | Return to HockeyAllsvenskan for the 2018–19 season |
| 4 | AIK | 5 | 1 | 1 | 1 | 2 | 12 | 14 | −2 | 9 | Return to HockeyAllsvenskan for the 2018–19 season |
| 5 | Almtuna IS | 5 | 0 | 1 | 1 | 3 | 10 | 20 | −10 | 5 | Return to HockeyAllsvenskan for the 2018–19 season |
| 6 | IK Pantern | 5 | 0 | 0 | 2 | 3 | 12 | 21 | −9 | 2 | Return to HockeyAllsvenskan for the 2018–19 season |

(Q) Qualified to the phase indicated

=== Playoff to the SHL qualifiers ===
In the playoff to the SHL qualifiers (Swedish: Play Off inför direktkval till SHL), the losing team from the HockeyAllsvenskan finals will meet the winning team from the HockeyAllsvenskan playoffs in a best-of-three series that will be played on 20 March, 22 March and 24 March. The winning team will advance to the SHL qualifiers.

==== Leksands IF vs. IK Oskarshamn ====
| 20 March | Leksands IF | 5–4 | OT | IK Oskarshamn | Tegera Arena | Recap |
| Johan Porsberger 1 – 9:45 | | First period | | 18:19 – pp – Marcus Björk 1 |
| No scoring | | Second period | | 14:27 – Arsi Piispanen 1 |
| Daniel Pietta 1 – 0:14; Oskar Lang 1 – sh – 3:34; Patrick Mcnally 1 – 12:25 | | Third period | | 14:08 – Mikael Kuronen 1; 18:42 – Marcus Björk 2 |
| Daniel Pietta 2 – pp – 12:53 | | First overtime period | | No scoring |
| Robin Rahm (26 saves / 30 shots) | | Goalie stats | | Christoffer Rifalk (33 saves / 38 shots) |

| 22 March | IK Oskarshamn | 4–1 | Leksands IF | Arena Oskarshamn | Recap |
| Jonas Engström 1 – 12:50; Jonas Engström 2 – 15:03 | | First period | No scoring |
| Lucas Elvenes 1 – 8:32 | | Second period | No scoring |
| Marcus Björk 3 – pp2 – 19:50 | | Third period | 14:26 – Emil Bemström 1 |
| Christoffer Rifalk (32 saves / 33 shots) | | Goalie stats | Robin Rahm (25 saves / 29 shots) |

| 24 March | Leksands IF | 4–0 | IK Oskarshamn | Tegera Arena | Recap |
| Matt Carey 1 – pp – 11:32; Anton Öhman 1 – pp – 18:43 | | First period | No scoring |
| Martin Karlsson 1 – 18:33 | | Second period | No scoring |
| Oskar Lang 2 – en – 17:39 | | Third period | No scoring |
| Tex Williamsson (21 saves / 21 shots) | | Goalie stats | Christoffer Rifalk (40 saves / 43 shots) |

| Leksands IF won series 2–1 |

=== SHL qualifiers ===
Two teams from the HockeyAllsvenskan and two teams from the SHL will play a best-of-seven series, with the winner qualifying for play in the 2018–19 SHL season. The winner of the HockeyAllsvenskan finals will meet team 14 from the SHL, while the winner of the playoff to the SHL qualifiers will meet team 13 from the SHL. Mora IK was the first team to win their series, 4–1, to qualify for continued SHL play. Timrå would then win their series, 4–3, to qualify for the SHL for the first time since 2012–13.

==== Karlskrona HK vs. Timrå IK ====
| 25 March | Karlskrona HK | 2–1 | OT | Timrå IK | Telenor Arena Karlskrona | Recap |
| No scoring | | First period | | No scoring |
| No scoring | | Second period | | No scoring |
| Bobbo Petersson 1 – pp – 6:45 | | Third period | | 11:44 – Marcus Hardegård 1 |
| Filip Cruseman 1 – 1:48 | | First overtime period | | No scoring |
| Johan Holmqvist (31 saves / 32 shots) | | Goalie stats | | Henrik Haukeland (23 saves / 25 shots) |

| 27 March | Timrå IK | 0–1 | Karlskrona HK | NHK Arena | Recap |
| No scoring | | First period | No scoring |
| No scoring | | Second period | 10:54 – Joachim Rohdin 1 |
| No scoring | | Third period | No scoring |
| Henrik Haukeland (10 saves / 11 shots) | | Goalie stats | Johan Holmqvist (22 saves / 22 shots) |

| 29 March | Karlskrona HK | 2–5 | Timrå IK | Telenor Arena Karlskrona | Recap |
| No scoring | | First period | 0:08 – Anton Wedin 1; 4:37 – pp – Alexandre Lavoie 1; 9:40 – Jacob Olofsson 1 |
| Joel Kellman 1 – 3:04; Emil Larsson 1 – 3:17 | | Second period | No scoring |
| No scoring | | Third period | 3:37 – Johannes Kinnvall 1; 17:42 – en – Jonathan Dahlén 1 |
| Johan Holmqvist (18 saves / 22 shots) | | Goalie stats | Henrik Haukeland (20 saves / 22 shots) |

| 31 March | Timrå IK | 2–4 | Karlskrona HK | NHK Arena | Recap |
| Jonathan Dahlén 2 – 8:20 | | First period | 19:47 – Mattias Karlsson 1 |
| Marcus Hardegård 2 – pp – 8:34 | | Second period | 11:28 – Filip Cruseman 2; 12:15 – Mattias Guter 1 |
| No scoring | | Third period | 19:44 – en – Filip Cruseman 3 |
| Henrik Haukeland (30 saves / 33 shots) | | Goalie stats | Johannes Jönsson (28 saves / 30 shots) |

| 2 April | Karlskrona HK | 1–3 | Timrå IK | Telenor Arena Karlskrona | Recap |
| No scoring | | First period | 13:48 – Vilmos Galló 1 |
| Mattias Guter 2 – 14:57 | | Second period | No scoring |
| No scoring | | Third period | 4:27 – Jacob Olofsson 2; 5:36 – Jonathan Dahlén 3 |
| Johannes Jönsson (14 saves / 17 shots) | | Goalie stats | Henrik Haukeland (39 saves / 40 shots) |

| 4 April | Timrå IK | 4–3 | Karlskrona HK | NHK Arena | Recap |
| Johan Persson 1 – pp – 8:32 | | First period | 0:50 – pp – Mattias Guter 3 |
| Anton Wedin 2 – 13:47 | | Second period | 10:42 – Mattias Guter 4 |
| Marcus Hardegård 3 – 7:38; Jacob Olofsson 3 – 14:29 | | Third period | 4:01 – Marcus Paulsson 1 |
| Henrik Haukeland (17 saves / 20 shots) | | Goalie stats | Johan Holmqvist (21 saves / 25 shots); Johannes Jönsson (1 save / 1 shot) |

| 6 April | Karlskrona HK | 0–2 | Timrå IK | Telenor Arena Karlskrona | Recap |
| No scoring | | First period | 0:44 – Vilmos Galló 2 |
| No scoring | | Second period | No scoring |
| No scoring | | Third period | 8:10 – Jonathan Dahlén 4 |
| Johannes Jönsson (18 save / 20 shot) | | Goalie stats | Henrik Haukeland (36 saves / 36 shots) |

| Timrå IK won series 4–3 |

==== Mora IK vs. Leksands IF ====
| 26 March | Mora IK | 2–5 | Leksands IF | Smidjegrav Arena | Recap |
| No scoring | | First period | 4:56 – Johan Porsberger 1 |
| David Kaše 1 – 4:31 | | Second period | 1:55 – Alex Friesen 1; 13:26 – Filip Johansson 1 |
| John Persson 1 – 19:36 | | Third period | 15:52 – Jon Knuts 1; 18>:09 – en – Johan Porsberger 2 |
| Christian Engstrand (14 saves / 18 shots) | | Goalie stats | Tex Williamsson (34 saves / 36 shots) |

| 28 March | Leksands IF | 2–3 | Mora IK | Tegera Arena | Recap |
| Austin Madaisky 1 – pp – 8:45 | | First period | 10:03 – pp – Andrew Rowe 1 |
| No scoring | | Second period | 6:46 – pp – Michael Haga 1 |
| Mattias Ritola 1 – pp – 6:27 | | Third period | 16:05 – Jacob Nilsson 1 |
| Tex Williamsson (24 saves / 27 shots) | | Goalie stats | Christian Engstrand (26 saves / 28 shots) |

| 30 March | Mora IK | 2–0 | Leksands IF | Smidjegrav Arena | Recap |
| No scoring | | First period | No scoring |
| Alexander Hilmerson 1 – 12:13 | | Second period | No scoring |
| Emil Aronsson 1 – 13:03 | | Third period | No scoring |
| Christian Engstrand (25 saves / 25 shots) | | Goalie stats | Tex Williamsson (21 saves / 23 shots) |

| 1 April | Leksands IF | 1–2 | Mora IK | Tegera Arena | Recap |
| No scoring | | First period | 8:54 – Mathias Bromé 1 |
| No scoring | | Second period | 0:24 – Andrew Rowe 2 |
| Martin Karlsson 1 – 14:26 | | Third period | No scoring |
| Tex Williamsson (21 saves / 23 shots) | | Goalie stats | Christian Engstrand (38 saves / 39 shots) |

| 3 April | Mora IK | 3–1 | Leksands IF | Smidjegrav Arena | Recap |
| No scoring | | First period | No scoring |
| Emil Aronsson 2 – 10:18 | | Second period | 18:32 – pp – Emil Bemström 1 |
| Mathias Bromé 2 – pp – 3:25; John Persson 2 – pp – 11:37 | | Third period | No scoring |
| Christian Engstrand (29 saves / 30 shots) | | Goalie stats | Tex Williamsson (17 saves / 20 shots) |

| Mora IK won series 4–1 |

== HockeyAllsvenskan qualifiers ==
Västervik and Troja/Ljungby, teams 13 and 14 from the regular season, were forced to defend their spots in HockeyAllsvenskan in the HockeyAllsvenskan qualifiers (Swedish: Kval till HockeyAllsvenskan). Joining the two HockeyAllsvenskan teams were four challengers from third-tier league Hockeyettan, the winner of the Hockeyettan Finals (Borlänge HF) and the three surviving teams from the Hockeyettan playoffs.

| Pos | Team | Pld | W | OTW | OTL | L | GF | GA | GD | Pts | Qualification |
|---|---|---|---|---|---|---|---|---|---|---|---|
| 1 | Västerviks IK (Q) | 10 | 6 | 1 | 2 | 1 | 32 | 19 | +13 | 22 | Qualify for the 2018–19 HockeyAllsvenskan season |
| 2 | VIK Västerås HK (P, Q) | 10 | 5 | 1 | 1 | 3 | 28 | 24 | +4 | 18 | Qualify for the 2018–19 HockeyAllsvenskan season |
| 3 | IF Troja/Ljungby (R) | 10 | 4 | 1 | 1 | 4 | 39 | 28 | +11 | 15 | Qualify for the 2018–19 Hockeyettan season |
| 4 | Huddinge IK | 10 | 3 | 2 | 0 | 5 | 20 | 31 | −11 | 13 | Qualify for the 2018–19 Hockeyettan season |
| 5 | Borlänge HF | 10 | 3 | 1 | 0 | 6 | 27 | 32 | −5 | 11 | Qualify for the 2018–19 Hockeyettan season |
| 6 | Piteå HC | 10 | 2 | 1 | 3 | 4 | 21 | 33 | −12 | 11 | Qualify for the 2018–19 Hockeyettan season |

(P) Promoted; (Q) Qualified to the phase indicated; (R) Relegated
