= 2020–21 HockeyAllsvenskan season =

- League: HockeyAllsvenskan
- Sport: Ice hockey
- Duration: October 2020 – March 2021 (regular season)
- Number of teams: 14
- TV partner(s): C More
- First place: Timrå IK
- Top scorer: Jonathan Dahlén (Timrå)
- Promoted to SHL: Timrå IK
- Relegated to Hockeyettan: Väsby IK HK

HockeyAllsvenskan seasons
- ← 2019–20 2021–22 →

The 2020–21 HockeyAllsvenskan season was the 16th season that the second tier of Swedish ice hockey operated under that name. The series consisted of 14 teams playing a regular season in which each team played each other team four times, twice at home and twice away. This is followed by a series of promotion and relegation tournaments, with the teams finishing first through tenth participating in promotion playoffs, and the teams finishing 13th and 14th forced to requalify to avoid relegation to the Hockeyettan.

Because of the COVID-19 pandemic no promotion took place after the previous season; Karlskrona HK were however relegated after being denied their mandatory elite license and Väsby IK HK were promoted in their place.

== Participating teams ==
HockeyAllsvenskan team map

Team	City	Arena	Capacity
AIK	Stockholm	Hovet	8,094
Almtuna IS	Uppsala	Upplands Bilforum Arena	2,800
IF Björklöven	Umeå	A3 Arena	5,400
BIK Karlskoga	Karlskoga	Nobelhallen	6,300
Kristianstads IK	Kristianstad	Kristianstads ishall	2,300
Modo Hockey	Örnsköldsvik	Fjällräven Center	7,600
Mora IK	Mora	Smidjegrav Arena	4,500
Södertälje SK	Södertälje	Scaniarinken	6,200
Timrå IK	Timrå	NHC Arena	6,000
Tingsryds AIF	Tingsryd	Nelson Garden Arena	3,400
HC Vita Hästen	Norrköping	Himmelstalundshallen	4,280
Väsby IK	Upplands Väsby	Renew Arena	3,000
Västerviks IK	Västervik	Plivit Arena	2,500
Västerås IK	Västerås	ABB Arena Nord	4,902

Note 1: Väsby played their final home game of the regular season against Almtuna, in Almtuna's home arena.

Note 2: Björklöven played one home game in Vännäs ishall.

== Regular season ==
=== Standings ===
Pos	Team	Pld	W	OTW	OTL	L	GF	GA	GD	Pts	Qualification or relegation
1	Timrå IK	52	36	4	2	10	199	101	+98	118	Advance to the Quarterfinals
2	BIK Karlskoga	52	28	3	6	15	165	136	+29	96	Advance to the Quarterfinals
3	IF Björklöven	52	26	6	3	17	182	136	+46	93	Advance to the Quarterfinals
4	Södertälje SK	52	22	9	8	13	165	137	+28	92	Advance to the Quarterfinals
5	Västerviks IK	52	19	10	8	15	134	124	+10	85	Advance to the Quarterfinals
6	Mora IK	52	22	5	9	16	170	165	+5	85	Advance to the Quarterfinals
7	Västerås IK	52	18	10	5	19	137	141	−4	79	Advance to the Eighth-finals
8	Tingsryds AIF	52	21	4	5	22	155	144	+11	76	Advance to the Eighth-finals
9	AIK	52	19	8	3	22	145	158	−13	76	Advance to the Eighth-finals
10	Almtuna IS	52	20	1	9	22	143	156	−13	71	Advance to the Eighth-finals
11	HC Vita Hästen	52	18	2	8	24	153	180	−27	66	
12	Modo Hockey	52	15	6	6	25	150	185	−35	63	
13	Väsby IK HK (R)	52	12	4	6	30	136	211	−75	50	Advance to Play Out
14	Kristianstads IK	52	8	8	2	34	110	170	−60	42	Advance to Play Out

Updated to match(es) played on 14 March 2021. Source:
(R) Relegated

=== Statistics ===
==== Scoring leaders ====
The following shows the top ten players who led the league in points, at the conclusion of matches played on 14 March 2021. If two or more skaters are tied (i.e. same number of points, goals and played games), all of the tied skaters are shown.

Player	Team	GP	G	A	Pts	+/–	PIM
(Sweden) Jonathan Dahlén	Timrå IK	45	25	46	71	+30	10
(Sweden) Jens Lööke	Timrå IK	52	23	39	62	+19	16
(Sweden) Henrik Björklund	BIK Karlskoga	52	26	30	56	+28	58
(Sweden) Anton Svensson	Tingsryds AIF	51	23	33	56	+1	47
(Sweden) Albin Lundin	Timrå IK	51	19	37	56	+27	18
(Denmark) Nick Olesen	Södertälje SK	48	20	33	53	–8	48
(Sweden) Daniel Ljunggren	Mora IK	52	9	43	52	–4	16
(Sweden) Linus Karlsson	BIK Karlskoga	52	20	31	51	+26	32
(Sweden) Lukas Wernblom	Mora IK	49	18	29	47	+4	113
(Sweden) Gustaf Thorell	BIK Karlskoga	40	14	33	47	+23	16

==== Leading goaltenders ====
The following shows the top ten goaltenders who led the league in goals against average, provided that they have played at least 40% of their team's minutes, at the conclusion of matches played on 14 March 2021.

Player	Team	GP	TOI	W	T	L	GA	SO	Sv%	GAA
(Sweden) Jacob Johansson	Timrå IK	41	2461:13	30	0	11	75	7	92.08	1.83
(Sweden) Daniel Marmenlind	Västerviks IK	38	2310:45	25	0	13	78	4	92.43	2.03
(Sweden) Tim Juel	BIK Karlskoga	40	2355:57	26	0	13	80	9	91.84	2.04
(Canada) Kevin Poulin	IF Björklöven	30	1638:17	20	0	9	61	3	91.52	2.23
(Sweden) Andreas Ljunggren	Tingsryds AIF	32	1866:46	17	0	15	74	4	91.48	2.38
(Sweden) Emil Kruse	Västerås IK	29	1655:18	16	0	13	67	4	91.85	2.43
(Sweden) Calle Clang	Kristianstads IK	32	1924:26	13	0	19	79	0	91.93	2.46
(Sweden) Claes Endre	AIK	41	2407:58	23	0	18	104	4	91.52	2.59
(Sweden) Matteus Ward	Mora IK	33	1878:37	19	0	11	85	3	90.67	2.71
(Sweden) Jesper Myrenberg	Västerås IK	26	1492:03	12	0	11	68	1	90.03	2.73

== Post-season ==
=== Playoff bracket ===
Eighth-finals; Swedish: Åttondelsfinal
7	Västerås IK	2
10	Almtuna IS	0
8	Tingsryds AIF	0
9	AIK	2

Quarterfinals; Swedish: Kvartsfinal
1	Timrå IK	3
9	AIK	1
2	BIK Karlskoga	3
7	Västerås IK	1
3	IF Björklöven	3
6	Mora IK	1
4	Södertälje SK	1
5	Västerviks IK	3

Semifinals
1	Timrå IK	4
5	Västerviks IK	2
(Pairings are re-seeded after the first and second round)
2	BIK Karlskoga	3
3	IF Björklöven	4

Finals
1	Timrå IK	4
3	IF Björklöven	1

=== Eighth-finals ===
Teams 7–10 from the regular season played best-of-three playoff series, where team 7 faced team 10 and team 8 faced team 9. In each series the higher-seeded team had home-ice advantage, playing at home for game 1 (plus 3 if necessary) while the lower-seeded team played at home for game 2. The winners moved on to the quarterfinals.

==== Västerås IK vs. Almtuna IS ====
17 March	Västerås IK	2–1	OT	Almtuna IS	ABB Arena Nord	Recap

19 March	Almtuna IS	1–3	Västerås IK	Gränby Ishall	Recap

Västerås IK won series 2–0

==== Tingsryds AIF vs. AIK ====
17 March	Tingsryds AIF	2–4	AIK	Nelson Garden Arena	Recap

19 March	AIK	6–4	Tingsryds AIF	Hovet	Recap

AIK won series 2–0

=== Quarterfinals ===
Teams 1–6 from the regular season, along with the winners of the eighth-finals, played best-of-five series, with the winners moving on to the semifinals. In each series the higher-seeded team had home-ice advantage, playing at home for games 1 and 2 (plus 5 if necessary) while the lower-seeded team played at home for game 3 (plus 4 if necessary). The higher-seeded half of the teams chose their opponents, with the highest-seeded remaining team choosing at each step.

==== Timrå IK vs. AIK ====
22 March	Timrå IK	5–1	AIK	NHC Arena	Recap

24 March	Timrå IK	1–2	AIK	NHC Arena	Recap

26 March	AIK	0–1	Timrå IK	Hovet	Recap

28 March	AIK	3–4	OT	Timrå IK	Hovet	Recap

Timrå IK won series 3–1

==== BIK Karlskoga vs. Västerås IK ====
23 March	BIK Karlskoga	4–2	Västerås IK	Nobelhallen	Recap

25 March	BIK Karlskoga	5–4	Västerås IK	Nobelhallen	Recap

27 March	Västerås IK	5–3	BIK Karlskoga	ABB Arena Nord	Recap

29 March	Västerås IK	0–1	BIK Karlskoga	ABB Arena Nord	Recap

BIK Karlskoga won series 3–1

==== IF Björklöven vs. Mora IK ====
22 March	IF Björklöven	3–4	OT	Mora IK	A3 Arena	Recap

24 March	IF Björklöven	4–3	OT	Mora IK	A3 Arena	Recap

26 March	Mora IK	3–5	IF Björklöven	Jalas Arena	Recap

28 March	Mora IK	2–3	OT	IF Björklöven	Jalas Arena	Recap

IF Björklöven won series 3–1

==== Södertälje SK vs. Västerviks IK ====
23 March	Södertälje SK	4–2	Västerviks IK	Scaniarinken	Recap

25 March	Södertälje SK	2–5	Västerviks IK	Scaniarinken	Recap

27 March	Västerviks IK	4–1	Södertälje SK	Plivit Arena	Recap

29 March	Västerviks IK	4–1	Södertälje SK	Plivit Arena	Recap

Västerviks IK won series 3–1

=== Semifinals ===
The winners of the quarterfinals play best-of-seven series, with the winners moving on to the Finals. The highest-seeded team chose whether to play the second-lowest seed or the lowest seed. In each series the higher-seeded team has home-ice advantage, playing at home for games 1 and 2 (plus 5 and 7 if necessary) while the lower-seeded team plays at home for games 3 and 4 (plus 6 if necessary).

==== Timrå IK vs. Västerviks IK ====
3 April	Timrå IK	3–1	Västerviks IK	NHC Arena	Recap

5 April	Timrå IK	4–3	OT	Västerviks IK	NHC Arena	Recap

7 April	Västerviks IK	4–1	Timrå IK	Plivit Arena	Recap

9 April	Västerviks IK	2–3	OT	Timrå IK	Plivit Arena	Recap

11 April	Timrå IK	1–3	Västerviks IK	NHC Arena	Recap

13 April	Västerviks IK	0–3	Timrå IK	Plivit Arena	Recap

Timrå IK won series 4–2

==== BIK Karlskoga vs. IF Björklöven ====
4 April	BIK Karlskoga	4–3	3OT	IF Björklöven	Nobelhallen	Recap

6 April	BIK Karlskoga	2–5	IF Björklöven	Nobelhallen	Recap

8 April	IF Björklöven	1–2	OT	BIK Karlskoga	A3 Arena	Recap

10 April	IF Björklöven	6–3	BIK Karlskoga	A3 Arena	Recap

12 April	BIK Karlskoga	4–5	IF Björklöven	Nobelhallen	Recap

14 April	IF Björklöven	1–5	BIK Karlskoga	A3 Arena	Recap

16 April	BIK Karlskoga	5–8	IF Björklöven	Nobelhallen	Recap

IF Björklöven won series 4–3

=== Finals ===
The winners of the semifinals played a best-of-seven series, with the winner promoted to the Swedish Hockey League (SHL). The higher-seeded team had home-ice advantage, playing at home for games 1 and 2 (plus 5 and 7 if necessary) while the lower-seeded team played at home for games 3 and 4 (plus 6 if necessary).

18 April	Timrå IK	3–6	IF Björklöven	NHC Arena	Recap

19 April	Timrå IK	7–0	IF Björklöven	NHC Arena	Recap

9 May	IF Björklöven	3–6	Timrå IK	A3 Arena	Recap

10 May	IF Björklöven	2–6	Timrå IK	A3 Arena	Recap

12 May	Timrå IK	5–0	IF Björklöven	NHC Arena	Recap

Timrå IK won series 4–1

=== Play Out ===
Teams 13 and 14 from the regular season played a best-of-five series, with the winner remaining in HockeyAllsvenskan and the loser relegated to Hockeyettan. The higher-seeded team had home-ice advantage, playing at home for games 1 and 2 (plus 5 if necessary) while the lower-seeded team played at home for game 3 (plus 4 if necessary).

==== Väsby IK HK vs. Kristianstads IK ====
16 March	Väsby IK	2–3	Kristianstads IK	Renew Arena	Recap

17 March	Väsby IK	0–2	Kristianstads IK	Renew Arena	Recap

20 March	Kristianstads IK	1–3	Väsby IK	Kristianstads ishall	Recap

21 March	Kristianstads IK	2–3	2OT	Väsby IK	Kristianstads ishall	Recap

23 March	Väsby IK	1–2	2OT	Kristianstads IK	Renew Arena	Recap

Kristianstads IK won series 3–2
