= Marcus Björk =

Marcus Björk may refer to:

- Marcus Björk (figure skater) (born 1994), Swedish figure skater
- Marcus Björk (ice hockey) (born 1997), Swedish ice hockey player
