= Victor Aronsson =

Swedish ice hockey player

- Born: September 18, 1992 (age 33) Uppsala, Sweden
- Height: 5 ft 10 in (178 cm)
- Weight: 181 lb (82 kg; 12 st 13 lb)
- Position: Defense
- Shoots: Left
- Allsvenskan team Former teams: Almtuna IS; Karlskrona HK
- Playing career: 2011–present

Victor Aronsson (born September 18, 1992) is a Swedish professional ice hockey defenceman currently playing for Almtuna IS of the HockeyAllsvenskan.

Aronsson made his Swedish Hockey League debut playing with Karlskrona HK during the 2015-16 SHL season.
