= Rundqvist =

Rundqvist or Rundkvist is a Swedish surname that means "round twig".

Notable people with the surname include:

- Adam Rundqvist (born 1990), Swedish professional ice hockey player
- Danijela Rundqvist (born 1984) Swedish ice hockey player
- David Rundqvist (born 1993), Swedish ice hockey player
- Martin Rundkvist (born 1972), Swedish archaeologist
- Thomas Rundqvist (born 1960), Swedish professional ice hockey player
