= Sammy Gustafsson =

Swedish ice hockey player

- Born: October 17, 1988 (age 36); Sweden
- Height: 5 ft 11 in (180 cm)
- Weight: 181 lb (82 kg; 12 st 13 lb)
- Position: Goaltender
- Shoots: Left
- Hockeyettan team Former teams: Visby/Roma HK; Örebro HK; Karlskrona HK
- NHL draft: Undrafted
- Playing career: 2009–present

Sammy Gustafsson (born October 17, 1988) is a Swedish ice hockey goaltender. He is currently playing with Visby/Roma HK of the Hockeyettan.

Gustaffson made his Swedish Hockey League debut playing with Örebro during the 2008-09 Elitserien season.
