= Kristoffer Söder =

Swedish ice hockey player (born 1991)

- Born: 2 May 1991 (age 34) Skövde, Sweden
- Height: 6 ft 3 in (191 cm)
- Weight: 198 lb (90 kg; 14 st 2 lb)
- Position: Centre
- Shot: Left
- Played for: Karlskrona HK
- Playing career: 2008–2024

Kristoffer Söder (born 2 May 1991) is a Swedish former professional ice hockey player. He played in the Swedish Hockey League with Karlskrona HK from 2015 to 2018. The rest of his career, which lasted from 2008 to 2024, was spent in lower divisions in Sweden.
