= Anton Wedin =

Swedish ice hockey player (born 1993)

- Born: 1 March 1993 (age 32) Sundsvall, Sweden
- Height: 5 ft 11 in (180 cm)
- Weight: 194 lb (88 kg; 13 st 12 lb)
- Position: Winger
- Shoots: Left
- SHL team Former teams: Timrå IK; Chicago Blackhawks; HV71; Sibir Novosibirsk; Dynamo Moscow
- NHL draft: Undrafted
- Playing career: 2011–present

Anton Wedin (born 1 March 1993) is a Swedish professional ice hockey forward. He is currently playing with Timrå IK of the Swedish Hockey League (SHL).

== Playing career ==
Wedin first played as a youth with hometown club, IF Sundsvall Hockey, before securing a move as a junior to Timrå IK. In the 2009–10 season, Wedin was the leading scorer for his team in the J18 Allsvenskan. In the playoffs he registered 3 goals and 5 points in just three games.

In the 2011–12 season, Wedin made his professional debut with Timrå IK in the Elitserien, in a 2-1 shootout defeat to Frölunda HC on 26 December 2011. He went scoreless in 10 games in a limited fourth line role, before he was loaned out to hometown club IF Sundsvall of the HockeyAllsvenskan, featuring in two games.

On 30 July 2012, Wedin signed a one-year Elitserien contract with Timrå. In the 2012–13 season, he scored his first professional goals, registering both goals in a 4-2 defeat to Skellefteå AIK on 26 December 2012. He dressed in 41 games, totalling 4 goals and 5 points. Unable to help Timrå avoid relegation in the Kvalserien playoffs, he registered 1 assist in 7 games.

Wedin continued with Timrå, signing a one-year each year as the team remained in the Allsvenskan. In the 2015–16 season, he led the club in assists with 18, finishing second in points with 25 to Jonathan Dahlén. In the 2017–18 season, Wedin was a leading contributor on offense, finishing with 9 points in 10 Qualification games, as Timrå earned a promotion to the SHL.

On 23 April 2018, Wedin signed an improved SHL one-year contract for the 2018–19 season with Timrå. Wedin had a breakout season in his first year in the SHL, leading the club with 14 goals and placing third with 27 points in just 32 games. Despite scoring 9 points in 7 Kvalserien games he was unable to prevent Timrå's return to the Allsvenskan following relegation.

Through his standout performance with Timrå and as a free agent, Wedin fielded significant interest from the NHL. Swayed by a familiarity with Head Coach Jeremy Colliton, Wedin agreed to a one-year, entry-level contract with the Chicago Blackhawks on 11 May 2019. In his debut North American season, Wedin was assigned to begin the 2019–20 campaign with AHL affiliate, the Rockford IceHogs. He registered 7 goals and 17 points through 31 games with the IceHogs, earning a recall to the Blackhawks to appear in 4 NHL games.

As an impending restricted free agent with the Blackhawks and with the AHL season cancelled due to COVID-19, Wedin opted to return to Sweden by signing a three-year contract with HV71 of the SHL on 9 May 2020.

Following the 2021–22 season, having played in the Kontinental Hockey League (KHL) with HC Sibir Novosibirsk and Dynamo Moscow, Wedin as a free agent opted to return to his original club, Timrå IK of the SHL, agreeing to a long-term five-year contract on 7 April 2022.

== International play ==
Medal record

Ice hockey

Representing Sweden

IIHF World U18 Championships
Silver medal – second place	2011 Germany	

Wedin was selected to make his junior international debut Sweden at the 2011 World U18 Championships in Dresden, Germany. He claimed the Silver medal after losing the final to the United States.

Wedin made his first senior appearance with Sweden at the 2018 Karjala Tournament in Pardubice, Czech Republic. Playing on a line with Dennis Rasmussen and Nick Sörensen, he made his debut against the Czech Republic on 8 November 2018.

== Career statistics ==
=== Regular season and playoffs ===
			Regular season					Playoffs
Season	Team	League	GP	G	A	Pts	PIM	GP	G	A	Pts	PIM
2010–11	Timrå IK	J20	41	3	16	19	32	3	0	2	2	0
2011–12	Timrå IK	J20	33	12	15	27	34	3	1	0	1	2
2011–12	Timrå IK	SEL	10	0	0	0	0	—	—	—	—	—
2011–12	IF Sundsvall Hockey	Allsv	2	0	0	0	0	—	—	—	—	—
2012–13	Timrå IK	J20	17	8	14	22	6	—	—	—	—	—
2012–13	Timrå IK	SEL	41	4	1	5	2	—	—	—	—	—
2013–14	Timrå IK	Allsv	46	4	11	15	20	—	—	—	—	—
2014–15	Timrå IK	Allsv	50	9	10	19	18	—	—	—	—	—
2015–16	Timrå IK	Allsv	47	7	18	25	26	5	0	0	0	2
2016–17	Timrå IK	Allsv	29	2	3	5	8	5	0	0	0	0
2017–18	Timrå IK	Allsv	30	6	8	14	6	10	2	7	9	14
2018–19	Timrå IK	SHL	32	14	13	27	8	—	—	—	—	—
2019–20	Rockford IceHogs	AHL	31	7	10	17	8	—	—	—	—	—
2019–20	Chicago Blackhawks	NHL	4	0	0	0	4	—	—	—	—	—
2020–21	HV71	SHL	39	16	14	30	8	—	—	—	—	—
2021–22	Sibir Novosibirsk	KHL	14	1	1	2	2	—	—	—	—	—
2021–22	Dynamo Moscow	KHL	26	7	7	14	8	6	2	0	2	2
2022–23	Timrå IK	SHL	27	8	5	13	2	—	—	—	—	—
2023–24	Timrå IK	SHL	35	12	14	26	2	2	0	1	1	0
2024–25	Timrå IK	SHL	50	16	24	40	12	6	0	2	2	2
SHL totals			234	70	71	141	34	8	0	3	3	2
NHL totals			4	0	0	0	4	—	—	—	—	—
KHL totals			40	8	8	16	10	6	2	0	2	2

=== International ===
Year	Team	Event	Result	GP	G	A	Pts	PIM
2011	Sweden	U18	2nd place, silver medalist(s)	6	0	0	0	0
Junior totals				6	0	0	0	0
