= Filip Mingotti =

Swedish ice hockey player

- Born: December 18, 1993 (age 31); Sweden
- Height: 6 ft 0 in (183 cm)
- Weight: 163 lb (74 kg; 11 st 9 lb)
- Position: Defense
- Shoots: Left
- SHL team: Karlskrona HK
- NHL draft: Undrafted
- Playing career: 2012–present

Filip Mingotti (born December 18, 1993) is a Swedish ice hockey player. He is currently playing with Karlskrona HK of the Swedish Hockey League (SHL).

Mingotti made his Swedish Hockey League debut playing with Karlskrona HK during the 2012-13 SHL season.
