= Gustaf Thorell =

Swedish ice hockey player (born 1989)

- Born: December 12, 1989 (age 35) Karlstad, Sweden
- Height: 5 ft 11 in (180 cm)
- Weight: 203 lb (92 kg; 14 st 7 lb)
- Position: Wing
- Shoots: Left
- EHL team: HC Škoda plzeň
- Playing career: 2008–present

Gustaf Thorell (born December 12, 1989) is a Swedish professional ice hockey player. He played with Modo Hockey in the Elitserien during the 2010–11 Elitserien season.
