= Nicklas Heinerö =

Swedish ice hockey player

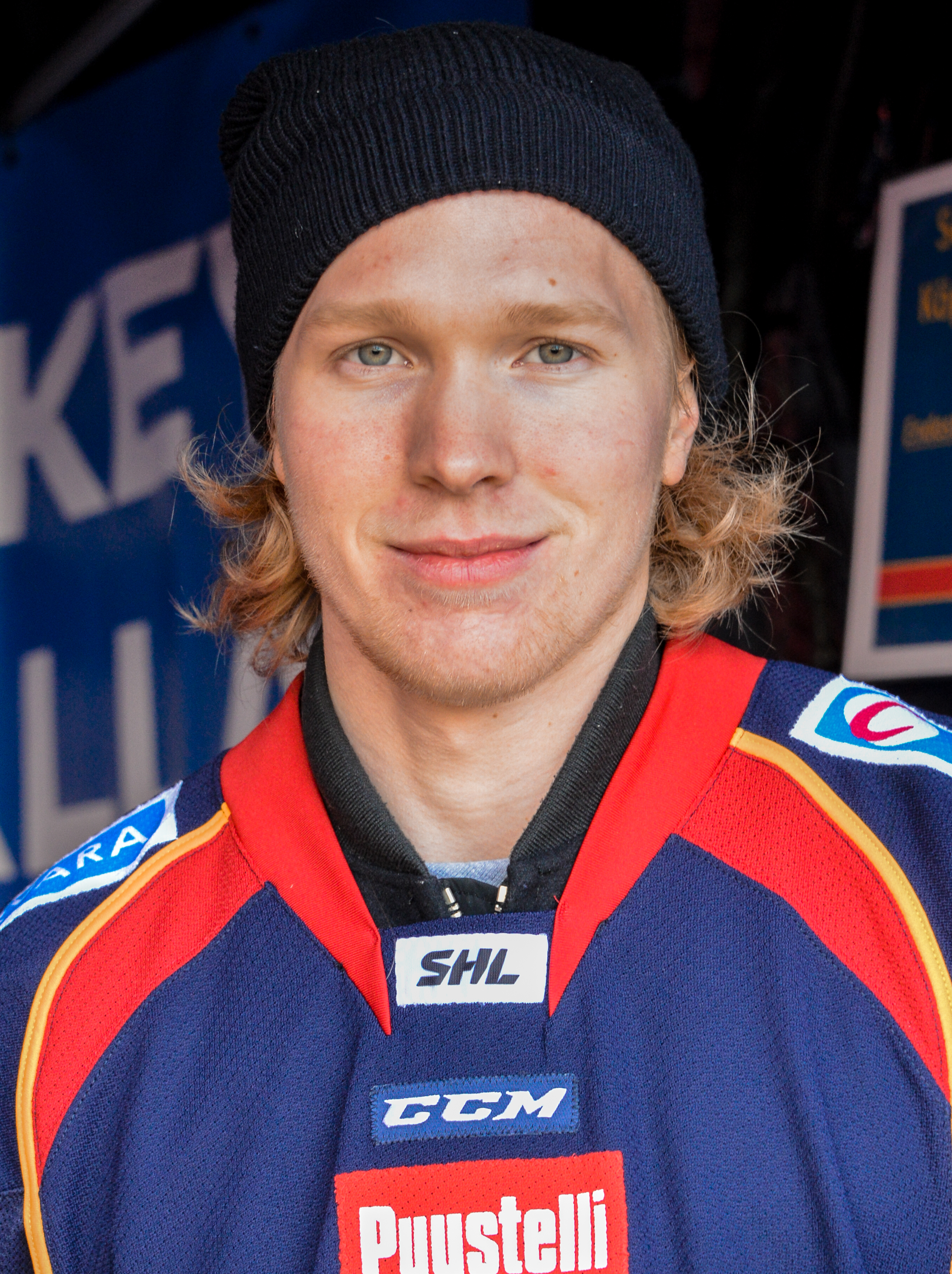
- Nicklas Heinerö in Stockholm 2015.
- Born: 2 March 1991 (age 34) Västerhaninge, Sweden
- Height: 5 ft 10 in (178 cm)
- Weight: 176 lb (80 kg; 12 st 8 lb)
- Position: Left wing
- Shoots: Right
- Allsv team Former teams: Mora IK; AIK IF; Huddinge IK; Djurgårdens IF; Södertälje SK; IK Oskarshamn; HK Dukla Trenčín
- Playing career: 2011–present

Nicklas Heinerö (born 2 March 1991) is a Swedish professional ice hockey player. He is currently playing for Mora IK of the HockeyAllsvenskan.

He played with AIK IF in the Elitserien during the 2010–11 Elitserien season and with Djurgårdens IF Hockey during the 2014–15 SHL season.

== Career statistics ==
=== Regular season and playoffs ===
			Regular season					Playoffs
Season	Team	League	GP	G	A	Pts	PIM	GP	G	A	Pts	PIM
