= Filiph Engsund =

Swedish ice hockey player

- Born: August 3, 1993 (age 32) Gothenburg, Sweden
- Height: 6 ft 0 in (183 cm)
- Weight: 185 lb (84 kg; 13 st 3 lb)
- Position: Center
- Shoots: Left
- Allsv team Former teams: Södertälje SK; IK Oskarshamn; Djurgårdens IF
- Playing career: 2011–present

Filiph Engsund (born 3 August 1993) is a Swedish professional ice hockey player. He currently plays for Södertälje SK in the HockeyAllsvenskan (Allsv). He formerly played in the Swedish Hockey League (SHL) with IK Oskarshamn and Djurgårdens IF.
