= Marcus Björk (ice hockey) =

Swedish ice hockey player

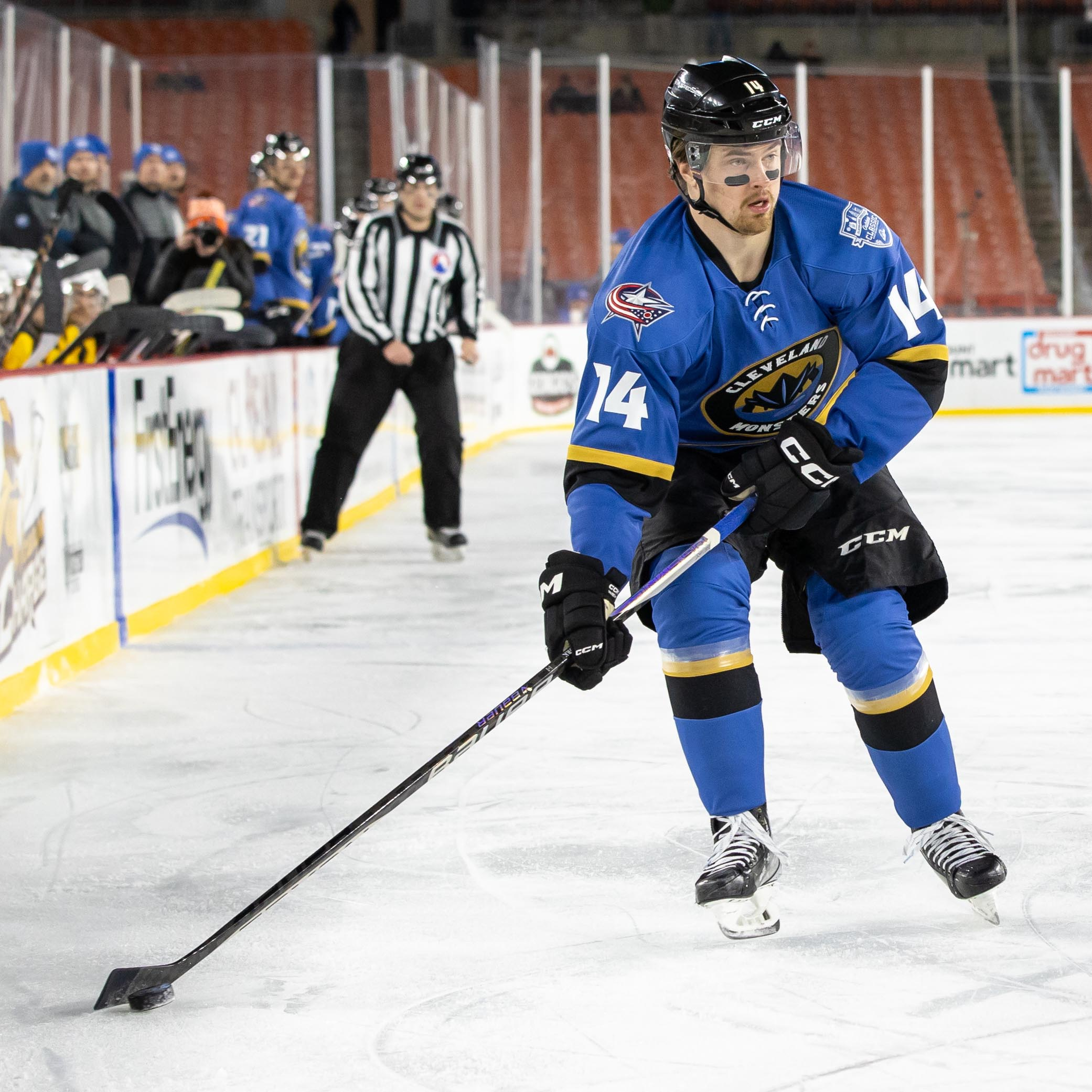
- Björk with the Cleveland Monsters in 2023
- Born: 24 November 1997 (age 28) Umeå, Sweden
- Height: 6 ft 3 in (191 cm)
- Weight: 203 lb (92 kg; 14 st 7 lb)
- Position: Defence
- Shoots: Right
- Allsv team Former teams: IF Björklöven; Örebro HK; Malmö Redhawks; Brynäs IF; Columbus Blue Jackets; Oulun Kärpät
- NHL draft: Undrafted
- Playing career: 2016–present

Marcus Björk (born 24 November 1997) is a Swedish professional ice hockey defenceman for IF Björklöven of the Swedish HockeyAllsvenskan.

== Playing career ==
Undrafted into the NHL, Björk played professionally in Sweden in the Swedish Hockey League from 2018 to 2022 with Örebro HK, the Malmö Redhawks and Brynäs IF.

He signed as a free agent to a one-year, entry-level contract with the Columbus Blue Jackets on 24 May 2022. After attending his first NHL training camp, Björk was assigned to begin the 2022–23 season with American Hockey League (AHL) affiliate, the Cleveland Monsters.

Following 11 games with the Monsters, with the Blue Jackets suffering a glut of injuries, Björk was recalled and made his NHL debut on 12 November 2022, and scored in a 4–3 overtime loss to the New York Islanders, making him just the seventh player in franchise history to score in his debut. In June 2023, Björk signed a one-year, two-way extension with the Blue Jackets. He spent the entire season with the Monsters, finishing fifth in playoff scoring on the team.

After undergoing off-season back surgery and training with a club in Sweden, Björk signed a deal with Oulun Kärpät of Liiga on 29 November 2024.

== Career statistics ==
			Regular season					Playoffs
Season	Team	League	GP	G	A	Pts	PIM	GP	G	A	Pts	PIM
2013–14	Luleå HF	J20	1	0	0	0	0	—	—	—	—	—
2014–15	Luleå HF	J20	37	2	12	14	16	3	0	0	0	0
2015–16	Luleå HF	J20	45	6	23	29	26	2	0	2	2	2
2016–17	Omaha Lancers	USHL	8	1	2	3	6	—	—	—	—	—
2016–17	Asplöven HC	Div.1	27	7	8	15	10	5	0	2	2	2
2017–18	IK Oskarshamn	Allsv	52	13	21	34	22	8	5	2	7	6
2018–19	Örebro HK	SHL	35	3	5	8	6	—	—	—	—	—
2018–19	Malmö Redhawks	SHL	17	2	3	5	6	5	1	1	2	27
2019–20	Malmö Redhawks	SHL	36	4	8	12	30	—	—	—	—	—
2019–20	Brynäs IF	SHL	13	2	6	8	10	—	—	—	—	—
2020–21	Brynäs IF	SHL	51	3	13	16	20	—	—	—	—	—
2021–22	Brynäs IF	SHL	52	3	12	15	26	3	0	0	0	2
2022–23	Cleveland Monsters	AHL	44	7	8	15	18	—	—	—	—	—
2022–23	Columbus Blue Jackets	NHL	33	3	8	11	42	—	—	—	—	—
2023–24	Cleveland Monsters	AHL	51	6	19	25	26	10	1	8	9	10
2024–25	Oulun Kärpät	Liiga	32	4	17	21	12	—	—	—	—	—
2025–26	Oulun Kärpät	Liiga	47	1	10	11	34	—	—	—	—	—
SHL totals			204	17	47	64	98	13	1	3	4	29
NHL totals			33	3	8	11	42	—	—	—	—	—
Liiga totals			79	5	27	32	46	—	—	—	—	—

== Awards and honors ==
Award	Year	Ref
HockeyAllsvenskan
Defenceman of the Year	2018	
