= Johannes Kinnvall =

Swedish ice hockey player

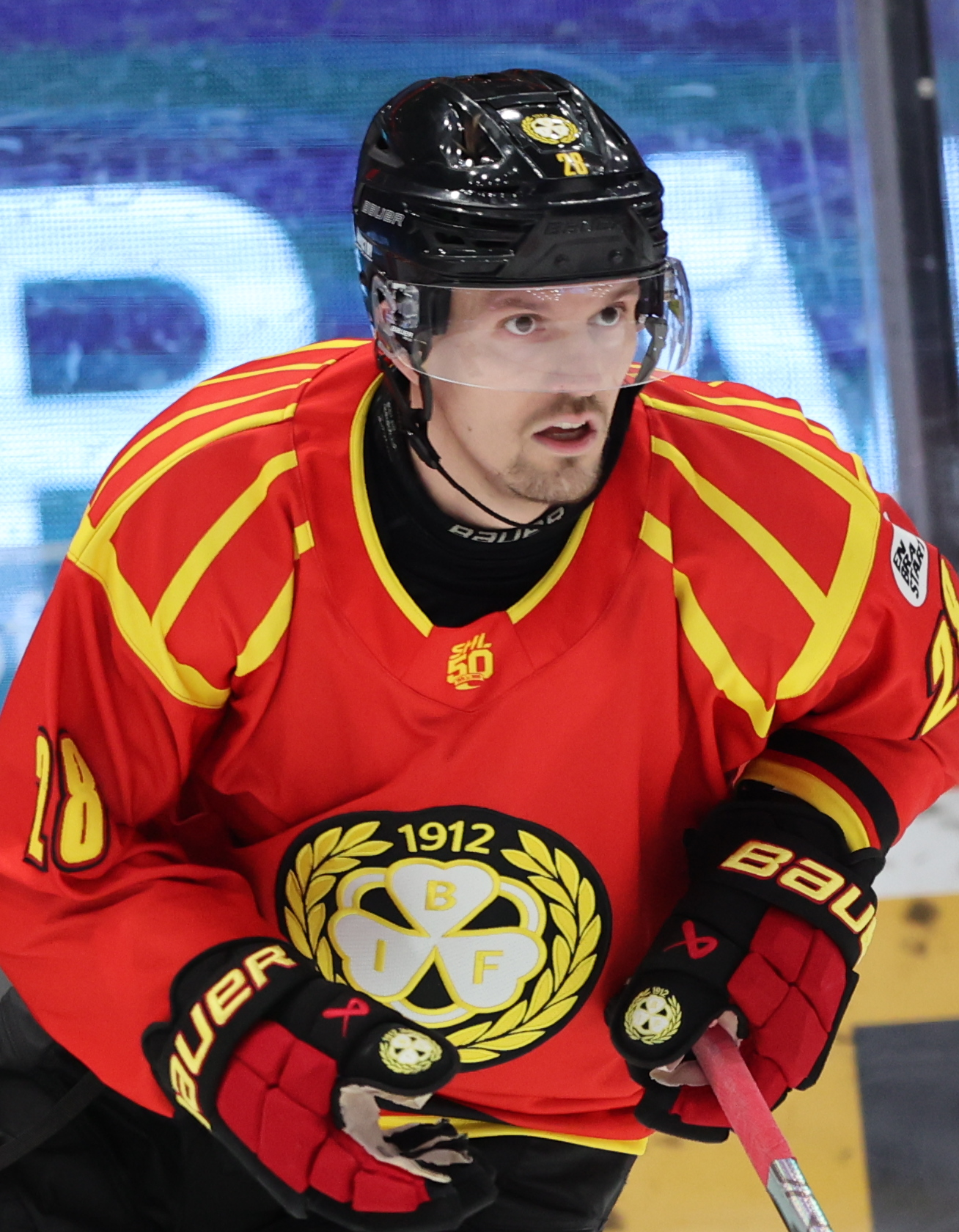
- Born: 28 July 1997 (age 28) Gävle, Sweden
- Height: 183 cm (6 ft 0 in)
- Weight: 84 kg (185 lb; 13 st 3 lb)
- Position: Defence
- Shoots: Right
- SHL team Former teams: Brynäs IF; Timrå IK; HV71
- NHL draft: Undrafted
- Playing career: 2017–present

Johannes Kinnvall (born 28 July 1997) is a Swedish professional ice hockey defenceman currently playing with Brynäs IF of the Swedish Hockey League (SHL).

== Playing career ==
While playing for Brynäs IF, Kinnvall made his Swedish Hockey League debut during the 2016–17 SHL season.

On 29 April 2020, Kinnvall was signed a two-year entry-level contract with the Calgary Flames of the National Hockey League. That same day it was announced that he would spend the first year of the contract to continue on loan with HV71 of the SHL.

At the conclusion of his entry-level deal with the Flames, Kinnvall as an impending restricted free agent returned to his original Swedish club, Brynäs IF, signing a two-year contract to continue in the SHL on 20 June 2022.

== Career statistics ==
			Regular season					Playoffs
Season	Team	League	GP	G	A	Pts	PIM	GP	G	A	Pts	PIM
2013–14	Valbo HC	J20	1	0	0	0	0	—	—	—	—	—
2014–15	Valbo HC	Div.2	1	0	3	3	2	3	0	0	0	0
2014–15	Valbo HC	J20	—	—	—	—	—	1	1	0	1	0
2015–16	Brynäs IF	J20	41	0	8	8	12	1	0	0	0	0
2016–17	Brynäs IF	J20	36	4	16	20	16	2	1	0	1	0
2016–17	Brynäs IF	SHL	18	0	0	0	4	3	0	0	0	0
2017–18	Timrå IK	Allsv	49	3	9	12	8	10	3	2	5	4
2018–19	Timrå IK	SHL	52	12	10	22	14	—	—	—	—	—
2019–20	HV71	SHL	51	11	29	40	8	—	—	—	—	—
2020–21	HV71	SHL	32	7	15	22	4	—	—	—	—	—
2021–22	Stockton Heat	AHL	19	0	8	8	8	—	—	—	—	—
2022–23	Brynäs IF	SHL	46	8	11	19	4	—	—	—	—	—
2023–24	Brynäs IF	Allsv	44	6	28	34	8	13	2	6	8	2
2024–25	Brynäs IF	SHL	51	3	11	14	10	17	1	3	4	14
2025–26	Brynäs IF	SHL	51	12	29	41	16	5	1	5	6	0
SHL totals			301	53	105	158	60	25	2	8	10	14
