= Filip Cruseman =

Swedish professional ice hockey player

- Born: October 14, 1990 (age 34); Stockholm, Sweden
- Height: 5 ft 8 in (173 cm)
- Weight: 185 lb (84 kg; 13 st 3 lb)
- Position: Forward
- Shoots: Left
- SHL team Former teams: Free Agent; Karlskrona HK
- Playing career: 2013–present

Filip Cruseman (born October 14, 1990) is a Swedish professional ice hockey player. He is currently an unrestricted free agent who most recently played with IF Björklöven in the HockeyAllsvenskan (Allsv).

Cruseman made his Swedish Hockey League debut playing with Karlskrona HK during the 2013–14 SHL season.
