= Bobbo Petersson =

Swedish ice hockey player

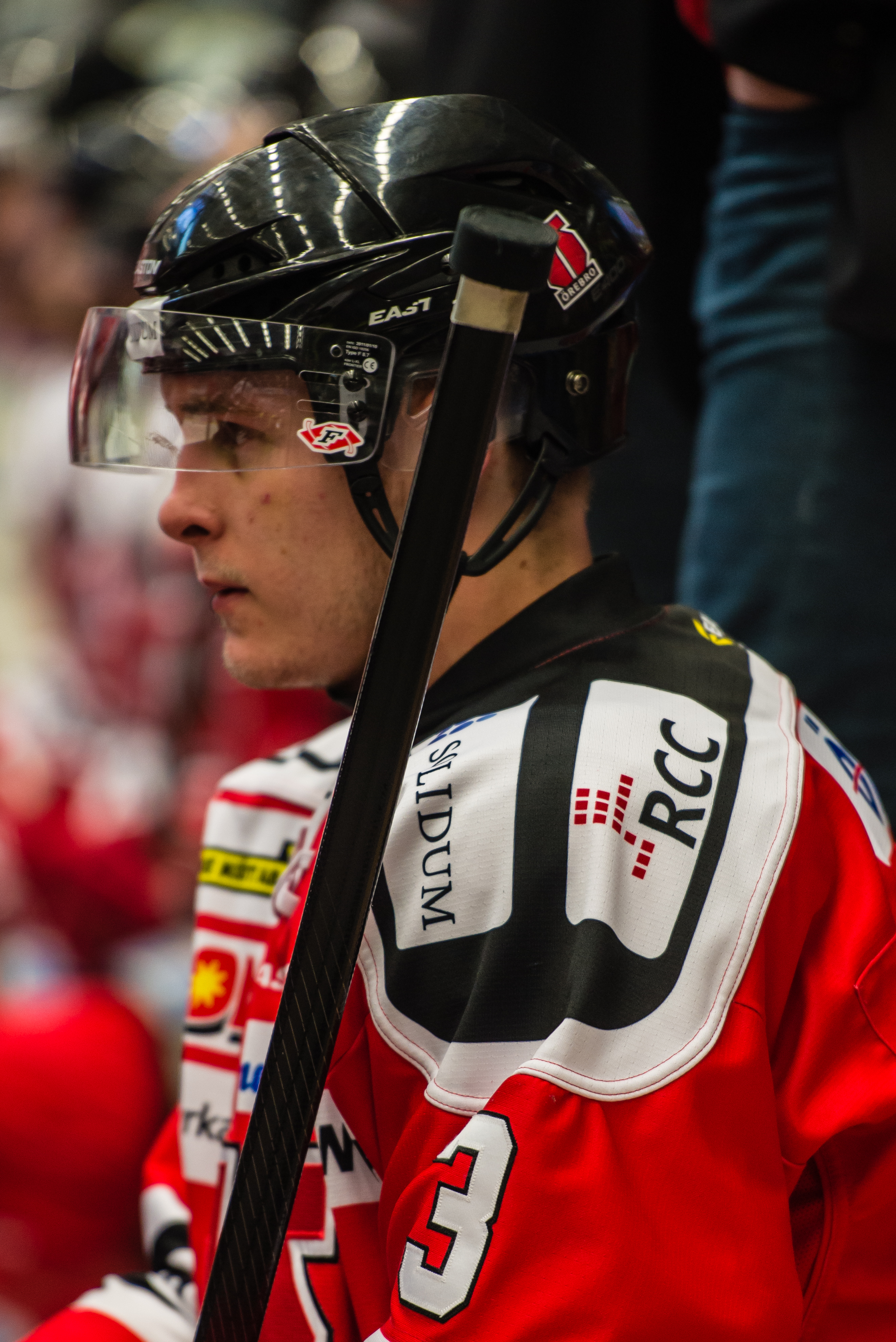
- Born: 11 May 1992 (age 34) Karlskrona, Sweden
- Height: 5 ft 10 in (178 cm)
- Weight: 174 lb (79 kg; 12 st 6 lb)
- Position: Defence
- Shoots: Left
- Allsv team Former teams: Södertälje SK; Örebro HK
- NHL draft: Undrafted
- Playing career: 2012–present

Bobbo Petersson (born 11 May 1992) is a Swedish ice hockey defenceman. He is currently playing with Södertälje SK of the HockeyAllsvenskan (Allsv). He made his Elitserien debut playing with Linköpings HC during the 2012–13 Elitserien season.
