= Sam Marklund =

Swedish ice hockey player

- Born: January 4, 1993 (age 32) Skellefteå, Sweden
- Height: 6 ft 0 in (183 cm)
- Weight: 190 lb (86 kg; 13 st 8 lb)
- Position: Centre
- Shoots: Left
- Polska Hokej Liga team Former teams: GKS Katowice; Skellefteå AIK; Växjö Lakers; AIK IF; Guildford Flames
- Playing career: 2012–present

Sam Marklund (born January 4, 1993) is a Swedish professional ice hockey player. He is currently under contract with GKS Katowice in the Polska Hokej Liga. Marklund previously played for AIK of the Hockeyallsvenskan (Allsv).

== Playing career ==
Marklund made his Elitserien debut playing with Skellefteå AIK during the 2011–12 Elitserien season. After a productive season in the HockeyAllsvenskan with Timrå IK in the 2015–16 season, Marklund secured a two-year SHL contract with the Växjö Lakers on April 27, 2016.

In 2017, Marklund joined Modo Hockey in the second tier Hockeyallsvenskan for the 2017–18 season. In 2018, Marklund joined AIK.

After spells at AIK IF and VIK Västerås HK, Marklund joined UK EIHL side Guildford Flames for the 2022–23 season.

Marklund then moved GKS Katowice ahead of the 2023–24 season.
