= Jonathan Dahlén =

Swedish ice hockey player (born 1997)

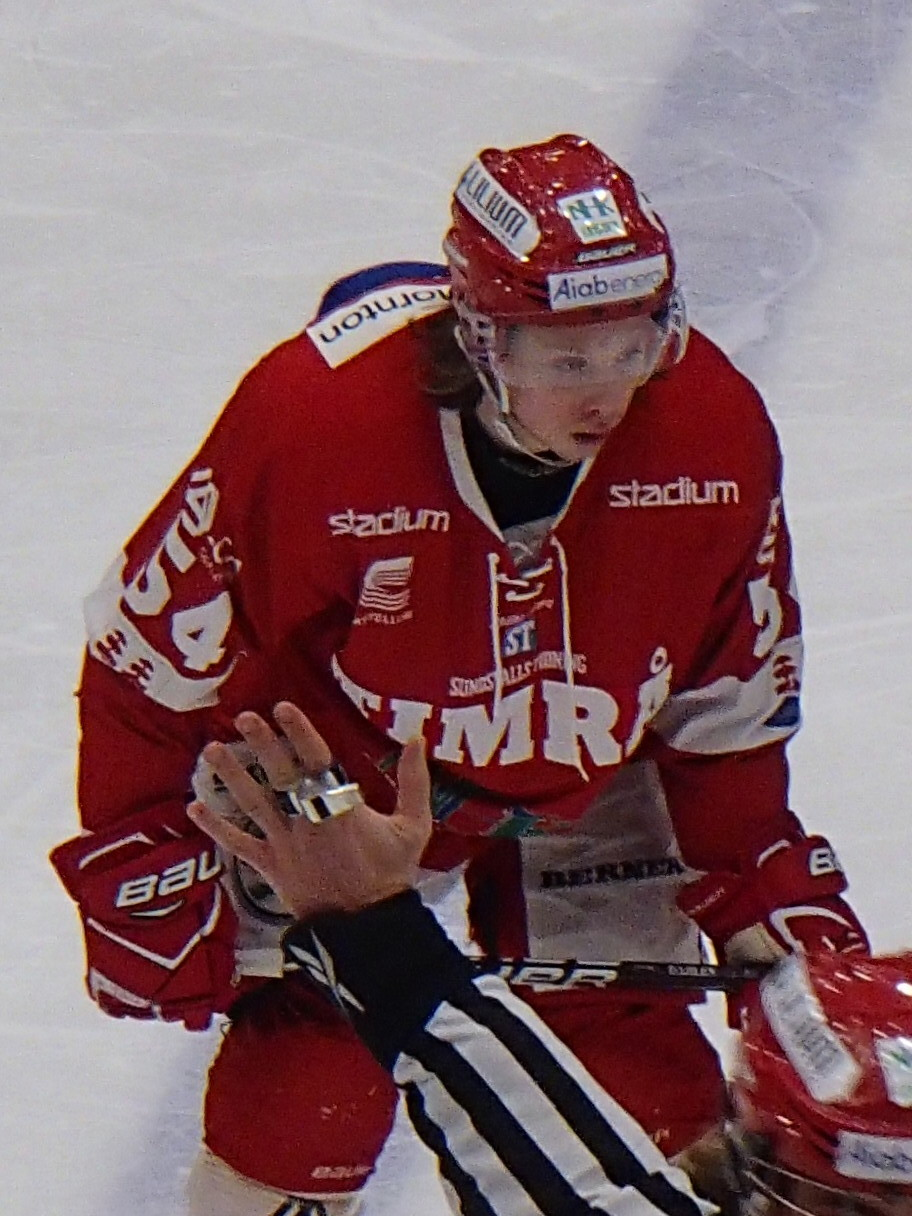
- Dahlén with Timrå IK in 2018
- Born: 20 December 1997 (age 28) Östersund, Sweden
- Height: 5 ft 11 in (180 cm)
- Weight: 176 lb (80 kg; 12 st 8 lb)
- Position: Left wing
- Shoots: Left
- SHL team Former teams: Timrå IK; San Jose Sharks
- National team: Sweden
- NHL draft: 42nd overall, 2016; Ottawa Senators
- Playing career: 2014–present

Jonathan Dahlén (born 20 December 1997) is a Swedish professional ice hockey player who is currently with Timrå IK in the Swedish Hockey League (SHL). Dahlén was rated as a top prospect, and was drafted 42nd overall by the Ottawa Senators in the 2016 NHL entry draft and played in the National Hockey League (NHL) with the San Jose Sharks.

== Playing career ==
In 2016, Dahlén led his team in scoring with 15 goals and 29 points in 51 games. He improved upon this in his second year, leading his team again with 25 goals and 19 assists in just 45 games.

On 27 February 2017, Dahlén was traded by the Senators to the Vancouver Canucks in exchange for Alex Burrows ahead of the NHL trade deadline. It was speculated the Canucks drafted friend Elias Pettersson based partly on highly successful chemistry with Dahlén on the top line for Timrå IK, where they finished fifth and ninth in league scoring as teenagers. The two scored the first shift they ever played together in Sweden.

At the conclusion of his season with Timrå IK, Dahlén was signed by the Canucks to a three-year entry-level contract on 21 April 2017. After suffering from mononucleosis during the 2017–18 preseason, Dahlén signed a contract with Timrå IK on 10 October 2017. Playing in Sweden in 2017–18, Dahlén was a leading contributor on offence as Timrå earned a promotion to the SHL. Dahlén was announced as the Top Forward and MVP in HockeyAllsvenskan.

On 12 April 2018, it was announced that Dahlén had been assigned to the Utica Comets of the AHL. Dahlén attended Vancouver's 2018 training camp and played with the Canucks during the 2018–19 pre-season, before he was assigned back to the Utica Comets before the NHL season opener.

On 25 February 2019, Dahlén was traded from the Vancouver Canucks to the San Jose Sharks in exchange for prospect Linus Karlsson. He registered 4 assists in 7 games with the Sharks’ AHL affiliate, the San Jose Barracuda, to close the season.

In early August 2019, unable to replicate his offensive success from Sweden in North America, Dahlén signed to return to Timrå IK of the Allsvenskan on loan from the San Jose Sharks. In the 2019–20 season, Dahlén matched the league's regular season scoring record with 77 points in 51 regular season games. He registered 5 points in the opening qualification game before Timrå's quest for promotion to the SHL was halted due to the COVID-19 pandemic.

On 26 May 2020, Dahlén agreed to a one-year extension to continue with Timrå IK, with his rights still owned by the Sharks. Selected as team captain of Timrå, Dahlén again led the club and league in scoring during the 2020–21 season, registering 71 points through 45 regular season games. He was named as the Allsvenskan's forward of the year and Most Valuable Player for the second season in succession, and finished as the playoff MVP, by registering 22 points through 15 post-season games to help Timrå IK claim the championship and gain promotion to the SHL.

On 14 June 2021, Dahlén was re-signed to a one-year, two-way contract with the San Jose Sharks. He made his NHL debut on 16 October 2021, in a 4–3 win over the Winnipeg Jets. His first goal came three days later, scoring twice in a 5–0 victory against the Montreal Canadiens. In completing his rookie season with the Sharks, Dahlén contributed with 12 goals and 22 points through 61 regular season games.

In the 2022 offseason, after not being tendered a qualifying offer to remain with the Sharks, he returned to his native Sweden in re-joining Timrå IK on a five-year contract on 31 August 2022.

== International play ==
He has represented Team Sweden at the U17, U18 and U20 World Junior Championships and led the tournament with 34 shots in seven games, for a 4.85 SH/GP. He scored a hat trick in the 2017 World Junior Ice Hockey Championships.

== Personal life ==
He is the son of former longtime NHL player Ulf Dahlén, who played 966 regular season games for six different teams. They are the first father-son duo to have played for the San Jose Sharks.

== Career statistics ==
=== Regular season and playoffs ===
| | | | Regular season | | | | | Playoffs |
| Season | Team | League | GP | G | A | Pts | PIM | GP | G | A | Pts | PIM |
|---|---|---|---|---|---|---|---|---|---|---|---|---|
| 2013–14 | HV71 | J20 | 6 | 1 | 1 | 2 | 0 | 3 | 1 | 1 | 2 | 0 |
| 2014–15 | Timrå IK | J20 | 40 | 25 | 25 | 50 | 14 | 2 | 1 | 1 | 2 | 0 |
| 2014–15 | Timrå IK | Allsv | 5 | 0 | 0 | 0 | 0 | — | — | — | — | — |
| 2015–16 | Timrå IK | J20 | 3 | 2 | 1 | 3 | 0 | — | — | — | — | — |
| 2015–16 | Timrå IK | Allsv | 51 | 15 | 14 | 29 | 8 | 5 | 6 | 1 | 7 | 2 |
| 2016–17 | Timrå IK | Allsv | 45 | 25 | 19 | 44 | 18 | 4 | 4 | 2 | 6 | 0 |
| 2016–17 | Timrå IK | J20 | — | — | — | — | — | 4 | 5 | 2 | 7 | 6 |
| 2017–18 | Timrå IK | Allsv | 44 | 23 | 21 | 44 | 8 | 10 | 8 | 6 | 14 | 2 |
| 2017–18 | Utica Comets | AHL | 2 | 1 | 1 | 2 | 2 | 4 | 0 | 1 | 1 | 0 |
| 2018–19 | Utica Comets | AHL | 50 | 14 | 15 | 29 | 10 | — | — | — | — | — |
| 2018–19 | San Jose Barracuda | AHL | 7 | 0 | 4 | 4 | 2 | — | — | — | — | — |
| 2019–20 | Timrå IK | Allsv | 51 | 36 | 41 | 77 | 42 | 1 | 2 | 3 | 5 | 0 |
| 2020–21 | Timrå IK | Allsv | 45 | 25 | 46 | 71 | 10 | 15 | 10 | 12 | 22 | 0 |
| 2021–22 | San Jose Sharks | NHL | 61 | 12 | 10 | 22 | 12 | — | — | — | — | — |
| 2022–23 | Timrå IK | SHL | 52 | 20 | 22 | 42 | 20 | 7 | 2 | 8 | 10 | 2 |
| 2023–24 | Timrå IK | SHL | 52 | 17 | 12 | 29 | 8 | 2 | 1 | 0 | 1 | 0 |
| 2024–25 | Timrå IK | SHL | 46 | 17 | 29 | 46 | 12 | 6 | 0 | 3 | 3 | 2 |
| NHL totals | | | 61 | 12 | 10 | 22 | 12 | — | — | — | — | — |
| SHL totals | | | 150 | 54 | 63 | 117 | 40 | 15 | 3 | 11 | 14 | 4 |

=== International ===
| Year | Team | Event | Result | GP | G | A | Pts | PIM |
|---|---|---|---|---|---|---|---|---|
| 2014 | Sweden | IH18 | 4th | 5 | 4 | 1 | 5 | 2 |
| 2015 | Sweden | U18 | 8th | 5 | 2 | 3 | 5 | 0 |
| 2017 | Sweden | WJC | 4th | 7 | 5 | 1 | 6 | 0 |
| Junior totals | | | | 17 | 11 | 5 | 16 | 2 |
