= Anton Öhman =

Swedish ice hockey player

- Born: December 2, 1995 (age 29) Umeå, Sweden
- Height: 5 ft 10 in (178 cm)
- Weight: 172 lb (78 kg; 12 st 4 lb)
- Position: Defence
- Shoots: Right
- SHL team: Skellefteå AIK
- NHL draft: Undrafted
- Playing career: 2013–present

Anton Öhman (born December 2, 1995) is a Swedish ice hockey defenceman. He is currently playing with Skellefteå AIK of the Swedish Hockey League (SHL).

Öhman made his Swedish Hockey League debut playing with Skellefteå AIK during the 2013–14 SHL season.
