= Jonas Engström =

Swedish ice hockey player

- Born: 21 January 1991 (age 34); Södertälje, Sweden
- Height: 6 ft 1 in (185 cm)
- Weight: 194 lb (88 kg; 13 st 12 lb)
- Position: Left wing
- Shoots: Left
- Allsv team Former teams: IK Oskarshamn; Södertälje SK; Växjö Lakers
- Playing career: 2009–present

Jonas Engström (born 21 January 1991) is a Swedish professional ice hockey winger who currently plays for the IK Oskarshamn in the HockeyAllsvenskan (Allsv).

== Playing career ==
He made his professional debut with hometown club, Södertälje SK, in the Elitserien during the 2009–10 season.

In the 2018–19 season, his fourth year as Captain of IK Oskarshamn in the HockeyAllsvenskan, Engström notched a career best 15 goals and 37 points in 52 games. He led Oskarshamn in the SHL Qualifiers, posting 8 points in 12 games to help promote Oskarshamn to the SHL for the first time in franchise history.

On 17 April 2019, Engström left Oskarshamn as a free agent, securing a two-year SHL contract with the Växjö Lakers.
