= Mikael Kurki =

Finnish ice hockey player

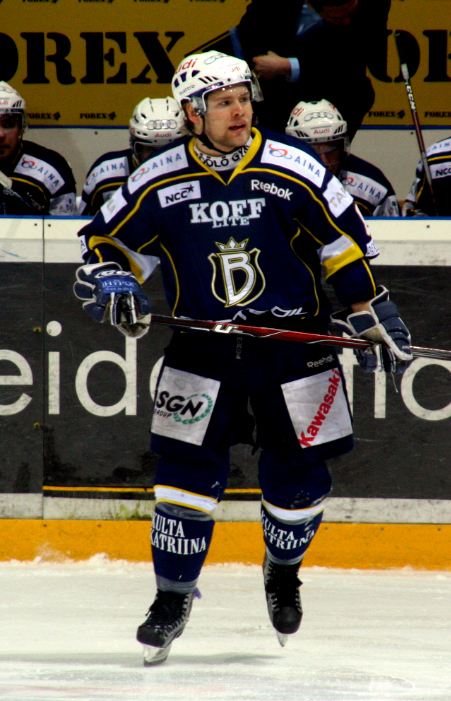
- Born: January 13, 1987 (age 38); Helsinki, FIN
- Height: 5 ft 10 in (178 cm)
- Weight: 187 lb (85 kg; 13 st 5 lb)
- Position: Defence
- Shoots: Right
- SM-liiga team: Blues
- Playing career: 2005–present

Mikael Kurki is a Finnish professional ice hockey defenceman who currently plays for Espoo Blues of the SM-liiga.
