= Oscar Nord =

Swedish ice hockey player

- Born: November 6, 1996 (age 28); Stockholm, Sweden
- Height: 6 ft 3 in (191 cm)
- Weight: 194 lb (88 kg; 13 st 12 lb)
- Position: Forward
- Shoots: Left
- Allsv team Former teams: AIK; Luleå HF; Malmö Redhawks
- Playing career: 2014–present

Oscar Nord (born November 6, 1996) is a Swedish professional ice hockey player. He is currently playing with AIK of the HockeyAllsvenskan (Allsv).

Nord made his Swedish Hockey League debut playing with Luleå HF during the 2014–15 SHL season.
