= Thomas Valkvæ Olsen =

Norwegian ice hockey player (born 1993)

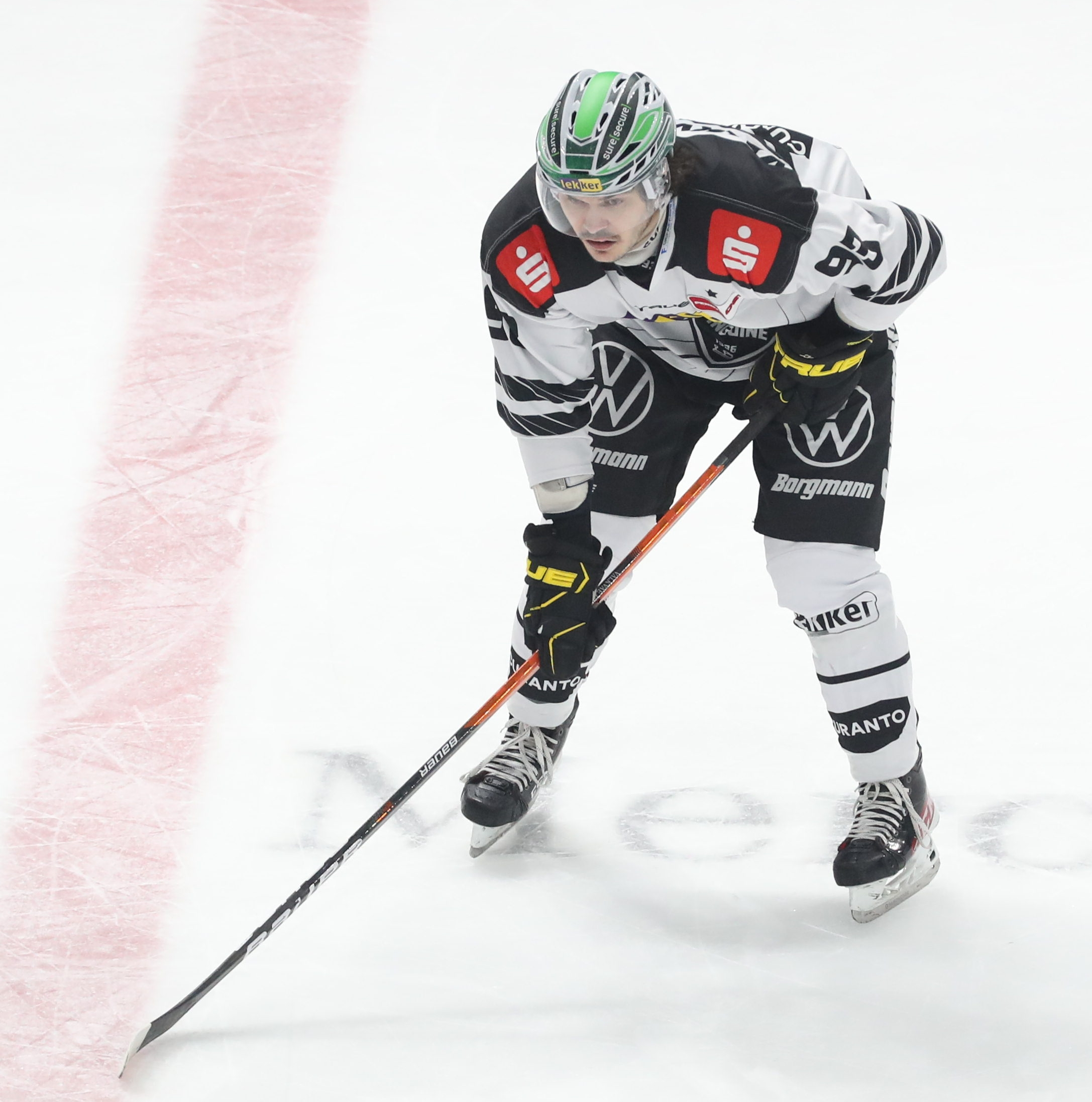
- Born: May 18, 1993 (age 32) Asker, Norway
- Height: 6 ft 1 in (185 cm)
- Weight: 194 lb (88 kg; 13 st 12 lb)
- Position: Forward
- Shoots: Right
- Norway team Former teams: Frisk Asker; BIK Karlskoga; Södertälje SK; Leksands IF; Bratislava Capitals; Krefeld Pinguine
- National team: Norway
- Playing career: 2011–present

Thomas Valkvæ Olsen (born May 18, 1993) is a Norwegian professional ice hockey player for Frisk Asker of the Fjordkraftligaen and the Norwegian national team.

He participated in the 2017 IIHF World Championship.

== Career statistics ==
=== Regular season and playoffs ===
			Regular season					Playoffs
Season	Team	League	GP	G	A	Pts	PIM	GP	G	A	Pts	PIM

=== International ===
Year	Team	Event	Result	GP	G	A	Pts	PIM
