= Axel Brage =

Swedish ice hockey player

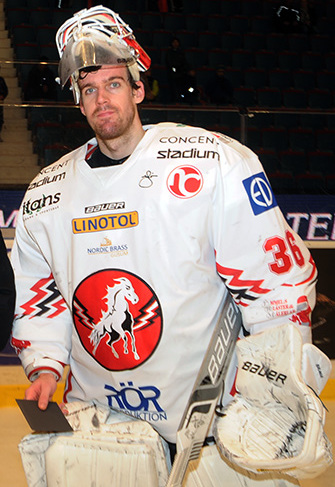
- Axel Brage in a hockey game
- Born: January 11, 1989 (age 36) Stockholm, Sweden
- Height: 6 ft 2 in (188 cm)
- Weight: 176 lb (80 kg; 12 st 8 lb)
- Position: Goaltender
- Catches: Left
- SHL team Former teams: Leksands IF; Linköping HC; Örebro HK
- Playing career: 2010–present

Axel Brage (born January 11, 1989) is a Swedish professional ice hockey goaltender currently playing with Leksands IF in Swedish Hockey League (SHL). He played as a youth and made his professional debut with Linköpings HC in the top-tier Swedish league Elitserien (SEL) during the 2010–11 Elitserien season.
