= Tex Williamsson =

Swedish professional ice hockey player

- Born: 1 January 1991 (age 34) Lammhult, Sweden
- Height: 6 ft 5 in (196 cm)
- Weight: 209 lb (95 kg; 14 st 13 lb)
- Position: Goaltender
- Catches: Left
- Allsv team Former teams: Modo Hockey; IK Oskarshamn
- Playing career: 2010–present

Tex Williamson (born 1 January 1991) is a professional Swedish ice hockey player. He was born in Lammhult, Sweden. Tex currently plays for Modo Hockey in the HockeyAllsvenskan (Allsv). He formerly played with IK Oskarshamn in the Swedish Hockey League (SHL). His youth team was Alvesta SK.
