= Martin Karlsson (ice hockey, born 1991) =

Swedish ice hockey player

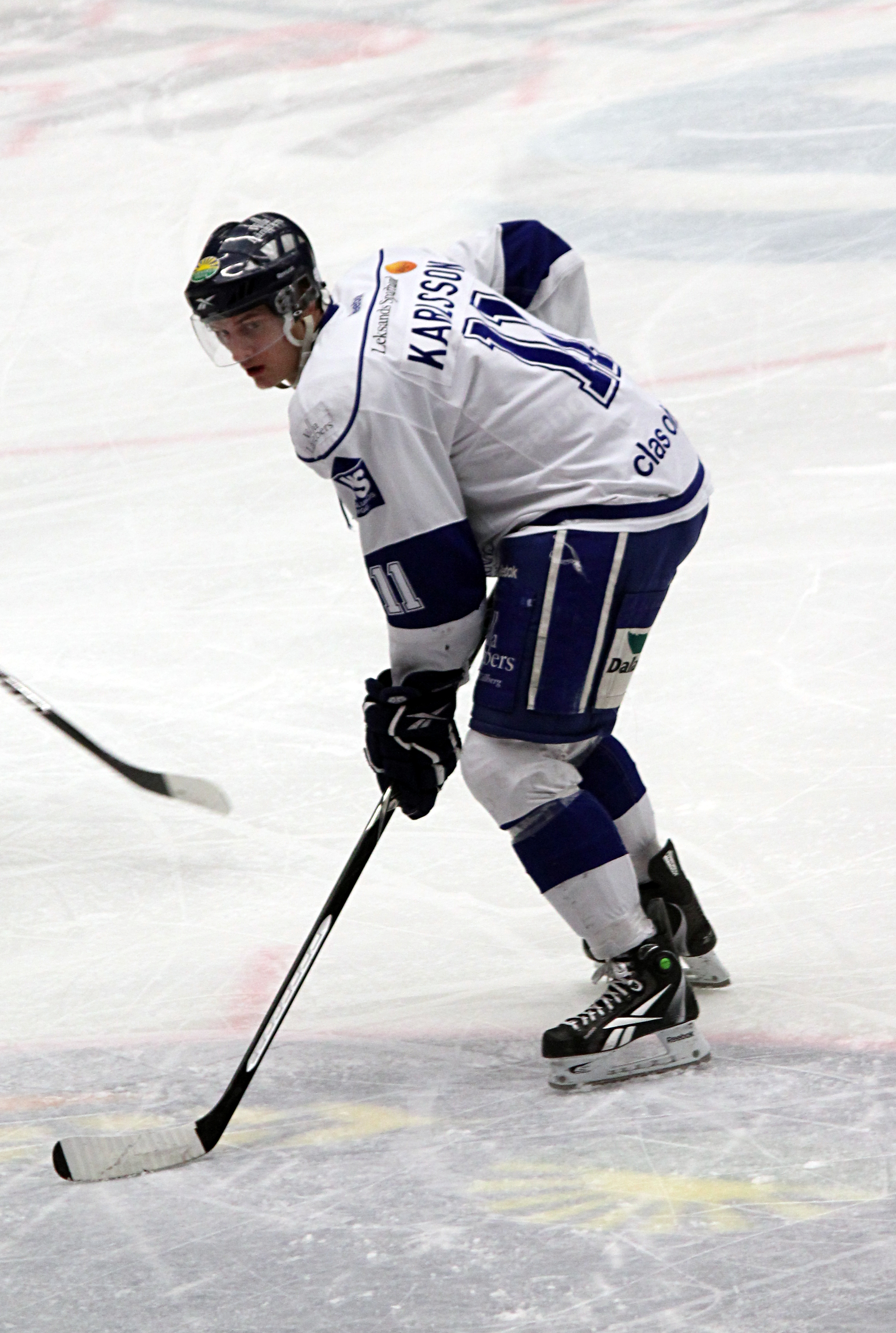
- Born: January 5, 1991 (age 34); Falun, Sweden
- Height: 6 ft 0 in (183 cm)
- Weight: 176 lb (80 kg; 12 st 8 lb)
- Position: Forward
- Shoots: Left
- SHL team Former teams: Free agent Leksands IF; AIK
- Playing career: 2009–present

Martin Karlsson (born January 5, 1991) is a Swedish professional ice hockey player. He is currently an unrestricted free agent, who most recently played as an alternate captain of Leksands IF of the Swedish Hockey League (SHL).

== Playing career ==
Karlsson played as a youth with hometown club, Leksands IF, and made his professional debut with the team in the HockeyAllsvenskan during the 2008–09 season.

Karlsson made his Swedish Hockey League debut playing on loan from Almtuna IS in the Allsvenskan, with AIK during the 2013–14 SHL season.

After four seasons away, Karlsson returned to his original club, Leksands IF in the Allsvenskan, signing a multi-year contract on 23 April 2015.
