= Karlskrona HK =

- City: Karlskrona, Sweden
- League: HockeyEttan
- Founded: 2001
- Home arena: NKT Arena Karlskrona
- Colors
- Website: Official website

Karlskrona HK is a Swedish ice hockey club located in Karlskrona, Sweden, established in 2001. They played three seasons in the top-tier Swedish Hockey League (SHL) between the 2015–16 and 2017–18 seasons. Their home arena is NKT Arena Karlskrona which has a capacity of 5,050 spectators.

== History ==
Following an impressive 2014–15 season, Karlskrona HK qualified for the SHL, only 14 years after the club was established. Important factors for the promotion were strong team play, reliable goaltending by Patrick Galbraith and offensive production by Joel Kellman (39 points) and Filip Cruseman (20 goals).

The club was relegated back to the second-tier league following the 2017–18 SHL season. After being denied the mandatory elite license, the club was further relegated to the third-tier league Hockeyettan following the 2019–20 HockeyAllsvenskan season; they were replaced by Väsby IK HK. The club was saved from bankruptcy by a fund raiser by fans and alumni including former player Joel Kellman and Swedish athlete and entrepreneur Jon Olsson.

== Season-by-season records ==
updated December 1, 2013

Season	League	GP	W	T	L	OTW	OTL	Pts	GF	GA	Finish	Playoffs
2001-02	Division 3	24	13	4	7	—	—	30	137	96	5th	—
2002-03	Division 3	24	15	1	8	—	—	31	117	76	5th	
2003-04	Division 3	20	8	3	9	–	–	19	111	97	4th	–
2004-05	Division 3	24	22	0	2	–	–	44	159	61	1st	–
2005-06	Division 3	26	20	3	3	–	–	43	176	55	2nd	Promoted
2006-07	Division 2	26	21	4	1	–	–	46	159	67	1st	-
2007-08	Division 2	24	17	4	3	–	–	38	132	59	1st	Qualified for Kvalserien (Div. 1)
2007-08	Kvalserien (Div. 1)	8	8	–	0	0	0	24	55	10	1st	Promoted
2008-09	Division 1	27	11	–	9	3	4	43	91	73	6th	–
2008-09	Division 1 Continuation	10	5	–	3	1	1	24	39	25	1st	Re-qualified for Division 1
2009-10	Division 1	27	13	–	8	2	4	47	103	91	5th	–
2009-10	Division 1 Continuation	10	8	–	2	–	–	32	42	19	1st	Re-qualified for Division 1
2010-11	Division 1	27	17	–	7	0	3	54	98	61	3rd	–
2010-11	Division 1 Continuation	14	5	–	4	3	2	23	40	36	4th	Qualified for Kvalserien (HockeyAllsvenskan)
2010-11	Kvalserien (HockeyAllsvenskan)	10	5	–	3	1	1	18	24	18	3	–
2011-12	Division 1	27	15	–	6	3	3	54	104	54	4th	–
2011-12	Division 1 Continuation	14	8	–	3	2	1	29	47	35	2nd	Qualified for Kvalserien (HockeyAllsvenskan)
2011-12	Kvalserien (HockeyAllsvenskan)	10	8	–	2	0	0	24	39	23	1st	Promoted
2012-13	HockeyAllsvenskan	52	11	–	38	1	2	37	107	186	14th	Playout in Kvalserien (HockeyAllsvenskan)
2012-13	Kvalserien (HockeyAllsvenskan)	10	5	–	3	1	1	18	31	27	2nd	Saved from relegation
2013-14	HockeyAllsvenskan	52	25	14	20	-	-	85	-	-	5th	

== Players ==
=== Current roster ===
Updated February 23, 2015.

No.	Nat	Player	Pos	S/G	Age	Acquired	Birthplace
5	(Finland)	Mikael Kurki	D	L	39	2012	Helsinki, Finland
61	(Sweden)	Mattias Granlund	LW	L	33	2014	Glommersträsk, Sweden
4	(Sweden)	Filip Mingotti	D	L	32	2009-10	Sweden
64	(Sweden)	Jonathan Pudas	D	R	32	2013	Sweden
19	(Sweden)	Kristoffer Söder	C	L	34	2010-11	Sweden
9	(Russia)	Vyacheslav Trukhno	LW	L	38	2014	Voskresensk, Russia
1	(Sweden)	Sammy Gustafsson	G	L	37	2015	Sweden
