= David Rundqvist =

Swedish ice hockey player (born 1993)

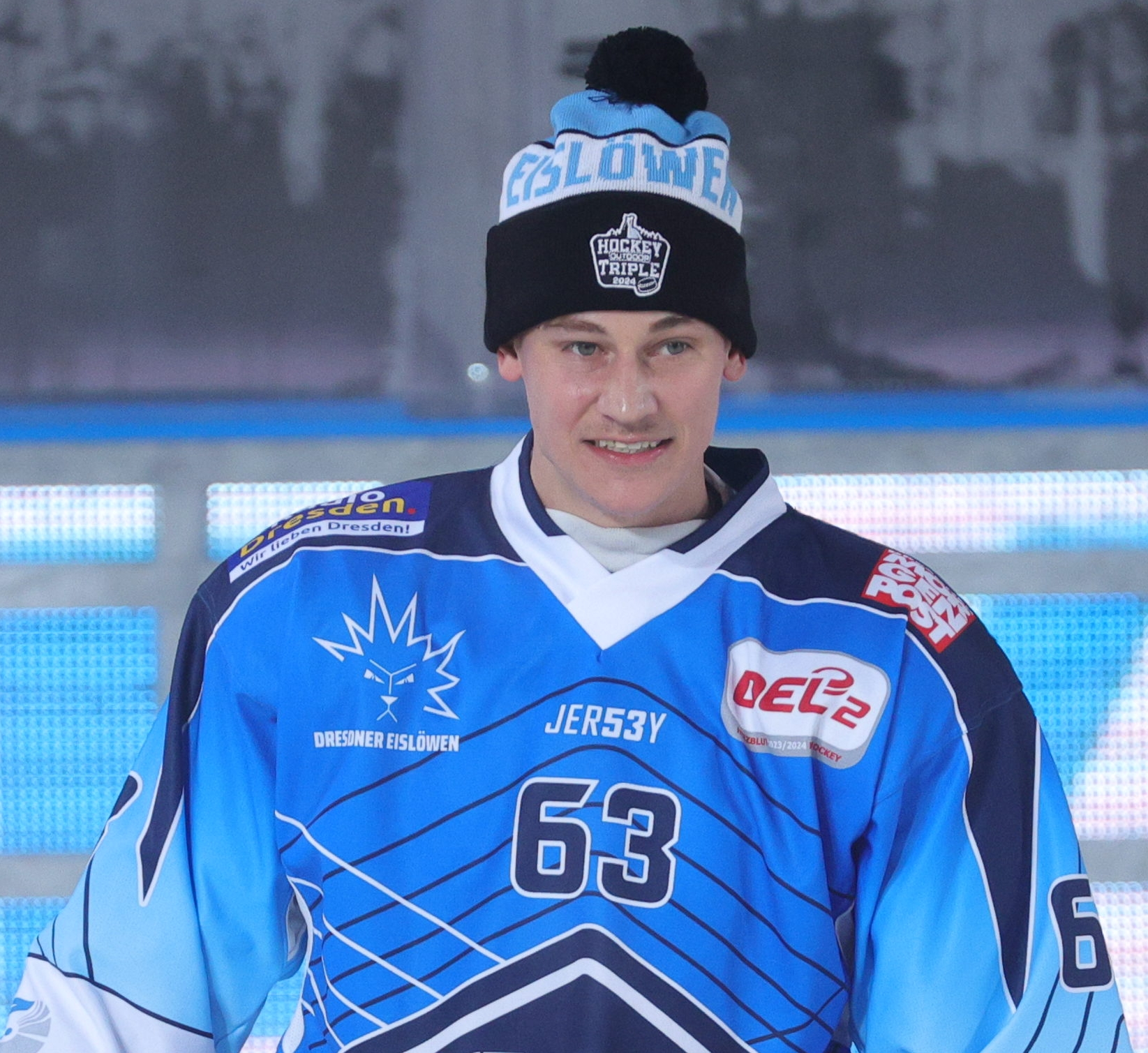
- David Rundqvist in an ice hockey game in 2024
- Born: January 13, 1993 (age 32); Karlstad, Sweden
- Height: 5 ft 11 in (180 cm)
- Weight: 183 lb (83 kg; 13 st 1 lb)
- Position: Forward
- Shoots: Left
- SHL team Former teams: Leksands IF; Färjestad BK; Djurgårdens IF
- Playing career: 2011–present

David Rundqvist (born January 13, 1993) is a Swedish professional ice hockey player, currently playing for Leksands IF in the Swedish Hockey League (SHL).

Rundqvist made his Elitserien debut playing with Färjestad BK during the 2012–13 Elitserien season.
