= Timrå Isstadion =

Indoor sporting arena in Timrå, Sweden

SCA Arena
- "Ladan"

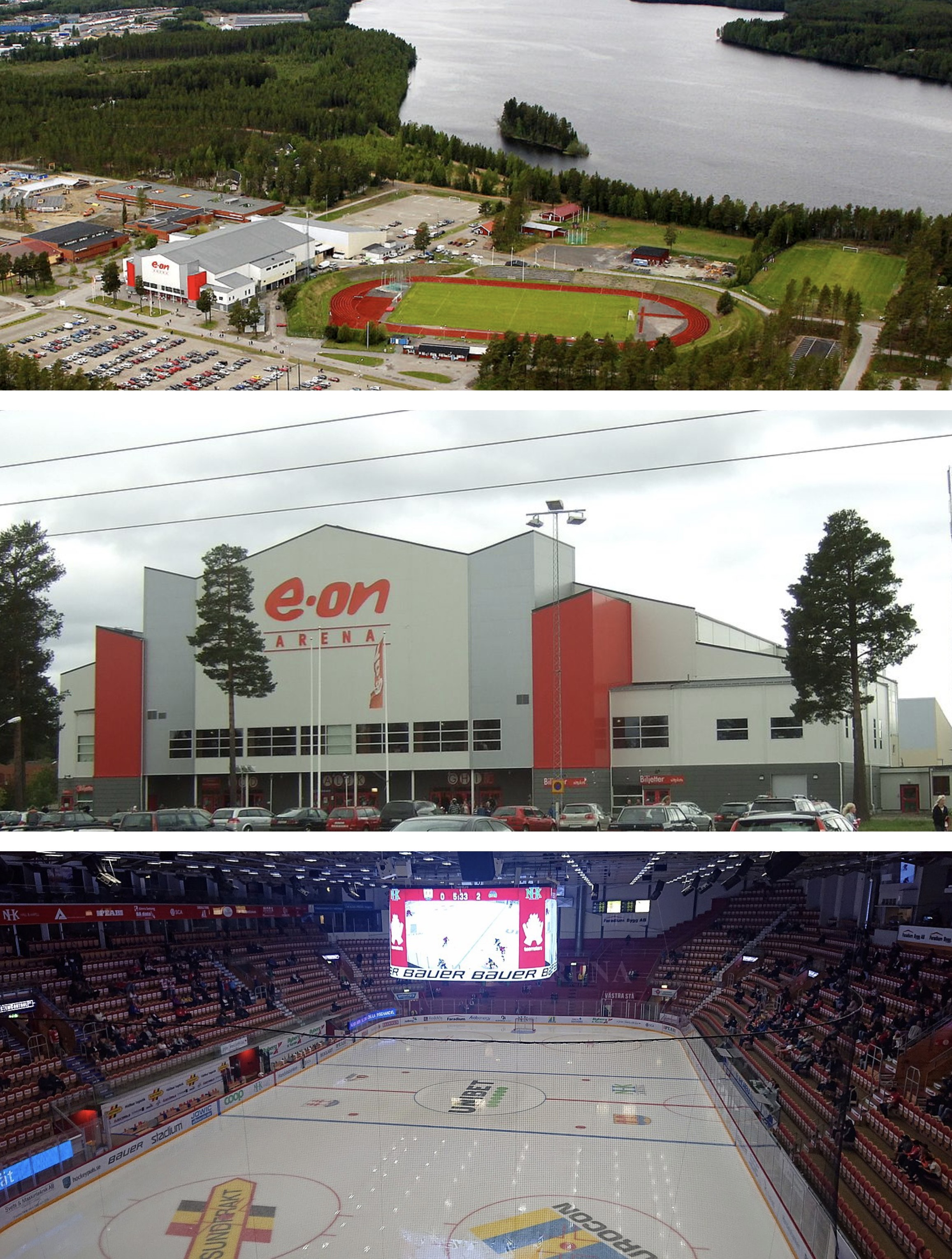
- Interactive map of SCA Arena
- Former names: Timrå Isstadion (1966–2003); Sydkraft Arena (2003–2005); E.ON Arena (2005–2015); Timrå Isstadion (2015–2016); NHK Arena (2016–2020); NHC Arena (2020–2023)
- Address: Sportvägen 4, Timrå, Medelpad, Sweden
- Coordinates: 62°30′21″N 17°21′00″E
- Owner: Timrå Municipality
- Capacity: 6,000 (4,600 seats + 1,400 stands)
- Public transit: Sörberge Arenaskolan

Construction
- Built: 1964–1966
- Opened: 4 September 1966
- Renovated: 1994
- Expanded: 2003 and 2006
- Cost: SEK 50 million (2003 expansion)

Tenant
- Timrå IK (1966–present)

Timrå Isstadion, currently known as SCA Arena and formerly known as NHC Arena, NHK Arena, E.ON Arena, Sydkraft Arena for sponsorship reasons, is an indoor sporting arena located in Timrå, Västernorrland County, Sweden. Construction began in 1964 and was inaugurated on 4 September 1966. Since then the venue has undergone several renovations and expansions. It is home arena of the SHL ice hockey team Timrå IK. Current capacity is 6,000.

== History ==
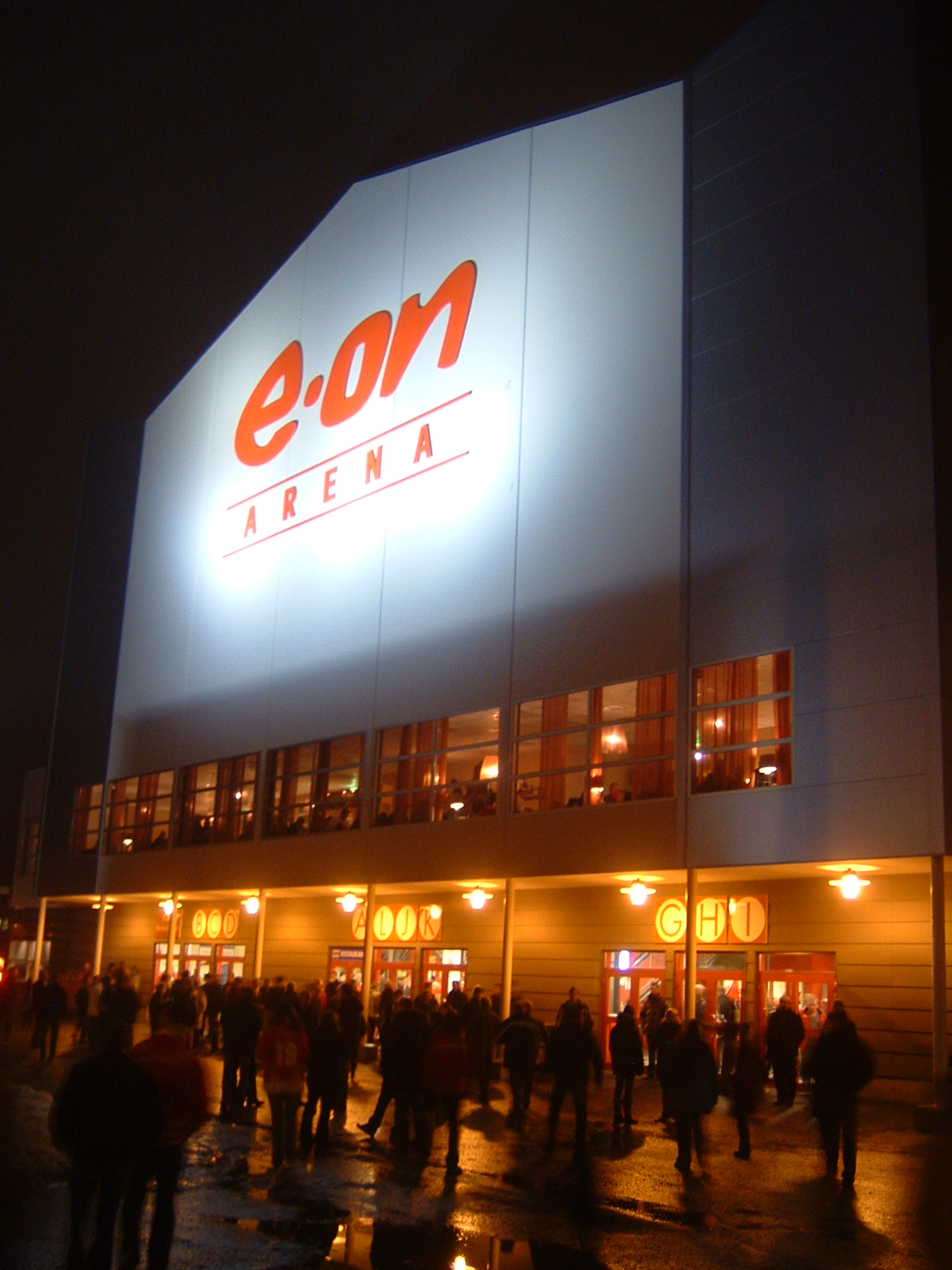
The venue in 2006

The current building was constructed in 2003 on the grounds of, and re-using the roof from the old Timrå Isstadion. This predecessor dates back to 1966 and was inaugurated 4 September, the same year, as the eighth ice hockey venue in Sweden. The old arena underwent a heavy refresh for the 1994/1995 season, resulting in a capacity of 5,500. When Timrå IK was promoted to Elitserien (now SHL) in the year 2000, the old Timrå Isstadion was time-worn and didn't meet the requirement for a modern ice hockey venue. Therefore, a second major reconstruction was made prior to the 2003/2004 season, resulting in today's capacity of 6,000. This is, however, still far from the all-time high arena audience record from 20 January 1972 of 11,695 paying spectators when Timrå IK played against Brynäs IF.

== Video cube ==
In October 2018, a new video cube was installed in the arena with a screen size of 170 square meters, among Europe's largest. It replaced the earlier one which was installed in 2005. The venture was jointly financed by Timrå IK and Northern Hall and Cover (NHC). The new video cube was inaugurated 18 Oktober 2018 in a SHL game against Rögle BK.

== Lill-Strimmahallen ==
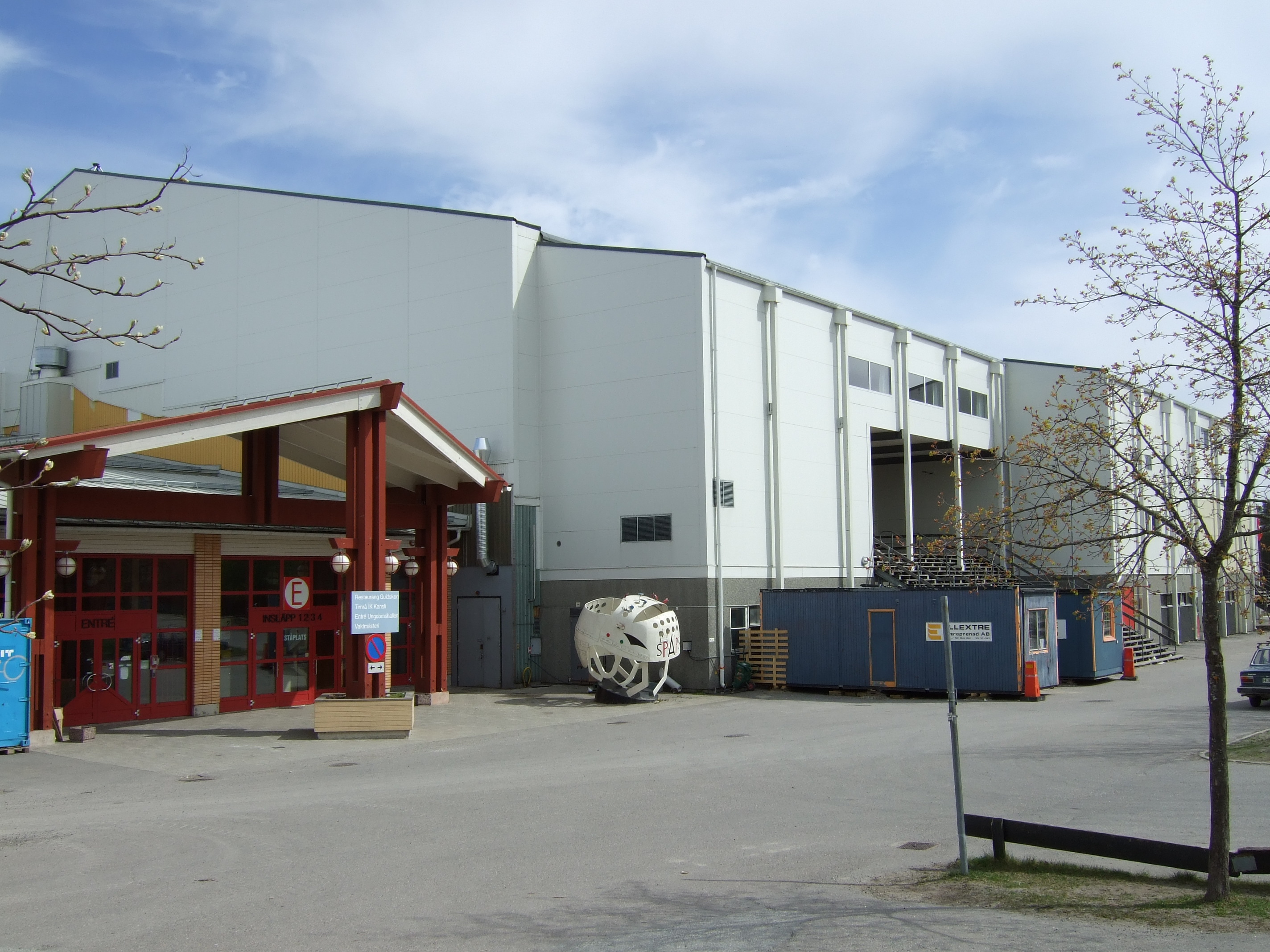
Entrance to Lill-Strimmahallen

In the early 1990s, the need for a new ice hockeyrink grew. The youth teams often had late training sessions in NHC Arena or had to play on the field. With the help of Timrå Municipality and many non-profit forces, construction started of Lill-Strimmahallen, adjacent to NHC Arena. The hall was ready for the 1991/1992 season and was then Sweden's 251st ice rink.

The inauguration had to wait until Lill-Strimma's 50th birthday (if he lived on) on 16 December 1994. The name became the logical "Lill-Strimmahallen". In total, the hall cost SEK 16 million. Lill-Strimmahallen has a capacity of 300 spectators.

== Overview ==
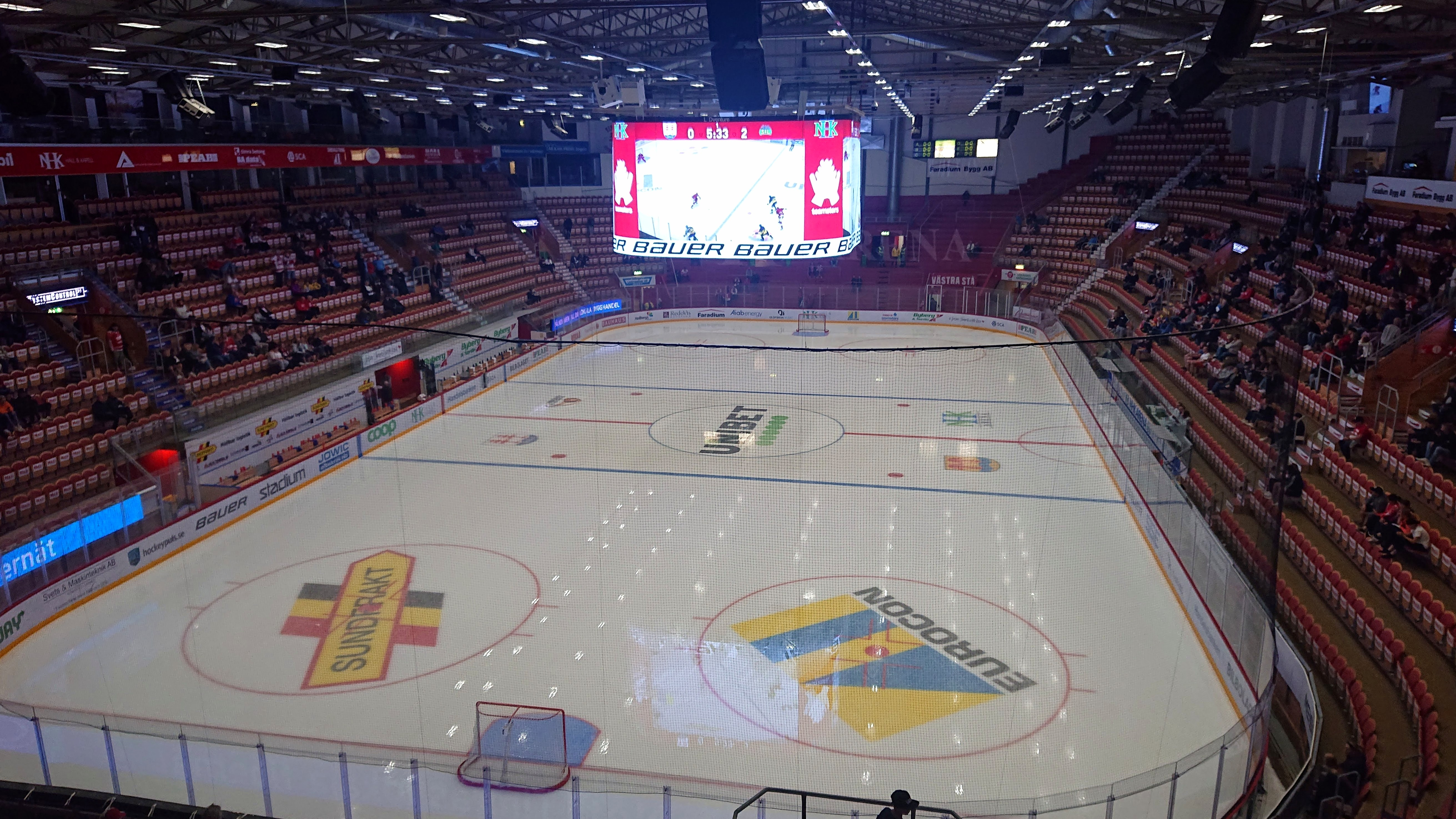
Overview of NHC arena from the away stand

== See also ==
- List of indoor arenas in Sweden
- List of indoor arenas in Nordic countries
