= List of current SHL team rosters =

The following is a list of the current Swedish Hockey League (SHL) team rosters.

== Brynäs IF ==
No.	Nat	Player	Pos	S/G	Age	Acquired	Birthplace
29	(Sweden)	Axel Andersson	D	R	26	2024	Järna, Sweden
19	(Sweden)	Nicklas Bäckström	C	L	38	2025	Valbo, Sweden
81	(United States)	Kieffer Bellows	LW	L	27	2025	Edina, Minnesota, United States
15	(Sweden)	Simon Bertilsson	D	L	35	2020	Karlskoga, Sweden
45	(Italy)	Damian Clara	G	L	21	2025	Brunico, Italy
61	(United States)	Collin Delia	G	L	31	2025	Rancho Cucamonga, California, United States
3	(Sweden)	Christian Djoos	D	L	31	2024	Gothenburg, Sweden
14	(Sweden)	Robert Hägg	D	L	31	2025	Uppsala, Sweden
71	(Sweden)	Axel Jonsson-Fjällby	LW	L	28	2025	Stockholm, Sweden
31	(Sweden)	Erik Källgren	G	L	29	2024	Stockholm, Sweden
5	(Czech Republic)	Michal Kempný	D	L	35	2025	Hodonin, Czech Republic
28	(Sweden)	Johannes Kinnvall	D	R	28	2022	Gävle, Sweden
52	(United States)	Jack Kopacka	RW	L	28	2023	Metamora, Michigan, United States
10	(Sweden)	Johan Larsson (C)	C	L	33	2022	Lau, Sweden
37	(Sweden)	Hugo Lejon	RW	R	21	2024	Västerås, Sweden
23	(Sweden)	Oskar Lindblom	LW	L	29	2024	Gävle, Sweden
27	(Sweden)	Mattias Norlinder	D	L	26	2025	Kramfors, Sweden
36	(Sweden)	Linus Ölund (A)	C	L	28	2019	Gävle, Sweden
47	(Sweden)	Lucas Pettersson	C	L	20	2025	Örnsköldsvik, Sweden
18	(Sweden)	Anton Rödin (A)	RW	L	35	2019	Stockholm, Sweden
41	(Canada)	Greg Scott	C	R	37	2019	Victoria, British Columbia, Canada
33	(Sweden)	Jakob Silfverberg	RW	R	35	2024	Gävle, Sweden
8	(United States)	Bobby Trivigno	LW	L	27	2024	Setauket, New York, United States
20	(United States)	Tyler Vesel	C	R	32	2023	Duluth, Minnesota, United States

Updated 22 August 2025

== Djurgårdens IF ==
No.	Nat	Player	Pos	S/G	Age	Acquired	Birthplace
61	(Sweden)	Viggo Björck	RW	R	18	2025	Stockholm, Sweden
45	(Sweden)	Hugo Blixt	D	L	28	2024	Västerås, Sweden
53	(Sweden)	David Blomgren	LW	L	22	2022	Stockholm, Sweden
20	(Norway)	Mathias Emilio Pettersen	C/LW	L	26	2025	Manglerud, Norway
35	(Sweden)	Magnus Hellberg	G	L	35	2025	Uppsala, Sweden
52	(Sweden)	Philip Holm	D	L	34	2025	Stockholm, Sweden
55	(Canada)	Charles Hudon (A)	LW	L	31	2025	Alma, Quebec, Canada
46	(Sweden)	Albin Grewe	RW	L	25	2023	Märsta, Sweden
32	(Sweden)	Marcus Krüger (C)	C	L	35	2022	Stockholm, Sweden
28	(Sweden)	Gustav Lindström	D	R	27	2025	Östervåla, Sweden
74	(Sweden)	Daniel Marmenlind	G	L	28	2025	Märsta, Sweden
37	(Sweden)	Jesper Pettersson (A)	D	R	31	2025	Stockholm, Sweden
29	(Norway)	Håvard Østrem Salsten	LW	L	25	2025	Hamar, Norway
82	(Canada)	Colby Sissons	D	L	28	2024	Edmonton, Canada
7	(United States)	Joe Snively	C	L	30	2025	Herndon, Virginia, USA
	(Sweden)	Lukas Vejdemo	C	L	30	2026	Stockholm, Sweden

Updated 28 April 2026

== Färjestad BK ==
No.	Nat	Player	Pos	S/G	Age	Acquired	Birthplace
28	(Sweden)	Emil Alba	RW	L	28	2024	Stockholm, Sweden
7	(Sweden)	Axel Bergkvist	D	L	25	2022	Insjön, Sweden
15	(Sweden)	Jack Berglund	C	L	20	2023	Karlstad, Sweden
27	(Sweden)	Gabriel Carlsson	D	L	29	2025	Örebro, Sweden
92	(Sweden)	Lucas Forsell	RW	R	22	2020	Västerås, Sweden
65	(Sweden)	Noel Fransén	D	L	20	2023	Karlstad, Sweden
12	(Sweden)	Christoffer Jansson	C	L	27	2025	Stockholm, Sweden
59	(Sweden)	Linus Johansson (C)	C	L	33	2021	Ljungby, Sweden
13	(Sweden)	Joel Kellman	C	L	31	2023	Tingsryd, Sweden
33	(Finland)	Emil Larmi	G	L	29	2025	Lahti, Finland
71	(Sweden)	Viktor Lodin	C	L	26	2024	Leksand, Sweden
32	(Sweden)	Magnus Nygren	D	R	35	2023	Karlstad, Sweden
11	(Sweden)	Joakim Nygård (A)	LW	L	33	2021	Stockholm, Sweden
73	(Sweden)	Adam Ollas Mattsson	D	L	29	2024	Stockholm, Sweden
39	(Canada)	Luke Philp	C	R	30	2025	Calgary, Alberta, Canada
48	(Sweden)	Filip Roos	D	L	27	2025	Göteborg, Sweden
29	(Sweden)	Oskar Steen	C	R	28	2024	Karlstad, Sweden
98	(Slovakia)	Marián Studenič	RW	L	27	2024	Skalica, Slovakia
35	(Sweden)	Melker Thelin	G	L	20	2025	Umeå, Sweden
96	(Czech Republic)	David Tomášek	RW	R	30	2025	Prague, Czech Republic
52	(Sweden)	August Tornberg	D	R	33	2022	Pajala, Sweden
6	(Sweden)	Albert Wikman	D	L	21	2025	Karlstad, Sweden
67	(Czech Republic)	Radim Zohorna	C	L	30	2025	Havlickuv Brod, Czech Republic
22	(Sweden)	Per Åslund	LW	L	39	2016	Kil, Sweden

Updated 26 July 2025.

== Frölunda HC ==
No.	Nat	Player	Pos	S/G	Age	Acquired	Birthplace
17	(Sweden)	Isac Born	LW	L	21	2022	Onsala, Sweden
92	(Sweden)	Filip Cederqvist	C	L	25	2024	Skara, Sweden
44	(Sweden)	Noah Dower Nilsson	C	L	21	2022	Strömstad, Sweden
46	(Switzerland)	Dominik Egli	D	R	27	2024	Frauenfeld, Switzerland
2	(Sweden)	Christian Folin (A)	D	R	35	2021	Kungsbacka, Sweden
12	(Sweden)	Max Friberg (C)	LW	R	33	2017	Skövde, Sweden
6	(Sweden)	Filip Hasa	D	L	25	2022	Uppsala, Sweden
32	(Sweden)	Noah Hasa	C	L	23	2021	Uppsala, Sweden
26	(Sweden)	Isac Heens	D	L	26	2023	Vansbro, Sweden
33	(Sweden)	Linus Högberg	D	L	27	2023	Stockholm, Sweden
21	(Finland)	Jere Innala	LW	L	28	2025	Hauho, Finland
8	(Sweden)	Samuel Johannesson	D	R	25	2026	Halmstad, Sweden
1	(Sweden)	Lars Johansson	G	L	38	2022	Avesta, Sweden
31	(Sweden)	Nicklas Lasu (A)	C	L	36	2019	Mölndal, Sweden
11	(Sweden)	Max Lindholm	W	L	28	2025	Österhaninge, Sweden
27	(Sweden)	Theodor Niederbach	C	R	24	2025	Bjästa, Sweden
43	(Sweden)	Tom Nilsson	D	R	32	2022	Tyresö, Sweden
30	(Norway)	Tobias Normann	G	L	24	2024	Fredrikstad, Norway
40	(Sweden)	Jacob Peterson	C	L	26	2025	Lidköping, Sweden
25	(Finland)	Arttu Ruotsalainen	RW	L	28	2024	Oulu, Finland
15	(Sweden)	Gustav Rydahl	C	L	31	2023	Karlstad, Sweden
55	(Sweden)	Ivar Stenberg	W	L	18	2024	Stenungsund, Sweden
86	(Sweden)	Erik Thorell	LW	L	34	2023	Karlstad, Sweden
7	(Sweden)	Henrik Tömmernes	D	L	35	2023	Karlstad, Sweden
9	(Sweden)	Linus Weissbach	RW	L	28	2024	Gothenburg, Sweden
10	(Finland)	Max Westergård	LW	L	18	2025	Tampere, Finland

Updated June 6, 2025

== HV71 ==
Updated 23 July 2025

No.	Nat	Player	Pos	S/G	Age	Acquired	Birthplace
60	(Sweden)	Hugo Alnefelt	G	L	24	2024	Danderyd, Sweden
38	(Sweden)	Olle Alsing (C)	D	L	29	2024	Uppsala, Sweden
27	(Canada)	Jonathan Ang	RW	R	28	2024	Markham, Ontario, Canada
55	(Sweden)	Andreas Borgman	D	L	30	2025	Stockholm, Sweden
17	(Sweden)	Isac Brännström	LW	L	28	2023	Nässjö, Sweden
27	(Sweden)	Oscar Davidsson	LW	L	19	2024	Örebro, Sweden
80	(Denmark)	Frederik Dichow	G	R	25	2023	Vojens, Denmark
44	(Sweden)	Hugo Fransson	D	L	21	2023	Tranås, Sweden
19	(Sweden)	Niklas Hansson	D	R	31	2025	Jonstorp, Sweden
82	(Finland)	Santeri Hatakka	D	L	25	2025	Riihimäki, Finland
91	(Finland)	Aleksi Heponiemi	C	L	27	2025	Tampere, Finland
71	(Sweden)	William Ignberg Nilsson	RW	R	24	2024	Umeå, Sweden
36	(Norway)	Martin Johnsen	C	L	22	2025	Hamar, Norway
28	(United States)	Justin Kloos	C	R	32	2025	Lakeville, Minnesota, United States
8	(Sweden)	Lucas Lagerberg Hoen	D	L	21	2025	Mora, Sweden
30	(Finland)	Lassi Lehtinen	G	L	27	2025	Lahti, Finland
16	(Sweden)	Linus Lindström	C	L	28	2025	Skellefteå, Sweden
46	(Finland)	Joona Luoto	LW	L	28	2024	Tampere, Finland
96	(Sweden)	Nikola Pasic	C	L	25	2025	Gislaved, Sweden
9	(Sweden)	Hugo Pettersson	LW	R	20	2023	Tranås, Sweden
39	(Switzerland)	Jamiro Reber	C	L	19	2024	Münsingen, Switzerland
61	(Finland)	Axel Rindell	D	R	26	2025	Espoo, Finland
70	(Czech Republic)	Lukáš Rousek	C	L	27	2025	Ostrov nad Ohri, Czech Republic
40	(Sweden)	Oskar Stål Lyrenäs	RW	R	28	2023	Umeå, Sweden
21	(Sweden)	Mattias Tedenby	LW	L	36	2022	Vetlanda, Sweden
41	(Canada)	Riley Woods	LW	L	27	2025	Regina, Saskatchewan, Canada

== IF Björklöven ==
Updated 31 July, 2025.

No.	Nat	Player	Pos	S/G	Age	Acquired	Birthplace
57	(Canada)	Matt Cairns	D	L	28	2025	Mississauga, Ontario, Canada
24	(Sweden)	Linus Cronholm	D	L	25	2022	Malmö, Sweden
19	(Sweden)	Liam Dower Nilsson	C	L	23	2023	Göteborg, Sweden
31	(Sweden)	Olle Eriksson Ek	G	L	26	2025	Karlstad, Sweden
56	(Sweden)	Fredrik Forsberg	RW	R	29	2024	Uppsala, Sweden
16	(Sweden)	Gustaf Kangas	C	L	20	2024	Stockholm, Sweden
37	(Finland)	Lenni Killinen	RW	L	25	2024	Espoo, Finland
33	(Sweden)	Albin Lundin	C	L	30	2025	Stockholm, Sweden
28	(Canada)	Mathew Maione	D	L	35	2024	Toronto, Ontario, Canada
39	(Finland)	Joel Mustonen	C	L	33	2022	Oulu, Finland
10	(Sweden)	Marcus Nilsson	LW	L	34	2024	Charlottenberg, Sweden
8	(Sweden)	Lucas Nordsäter	D	L	27	2025	Sunne, Sweden
32	(Sweden)	Jacob Olofsson	C	L	26	2021	Piteå, Sweden
26	(Latvia)	Bruno Osmanis	RW	R	19	2023	Ogre, Latvia
18	(Sweden)	Axel Ottosson (C)	C	L	30	2024	Umeå, Sweden
71	(Sweden)	Gustav Possler	LW	L	31	2020	Södertälje, Sweden
26	(Sweden)	Oliwer Sjöström	D	L	19	2025	Umeå, Sweden
91	(Sweden)	Oscar Tellström	RW	L	23	2024	Luleå, Sweden
59	(Canada)	Tim Theocharidis	D	L	27	2024	Scarborough, Ontario, Canada
50	(Finland)	Frans Tuohimaa	G	L	34	2025	Helsinki, Finland
6	(Finland)	Olli Vainio	D	R	32	2025	Tampere, Finland

== Linköping HC ==
No.	Nat	Player	Pos	S/G	Age	Acquired	Birthplace
71	(Norway)	Eskild Bakke Olsen	C	R	24	2024	Hamar, Norway
40	(Sweden)	David Bernhardt	D	L	28	2025	Huddinge, Sweden
21	(Sweden)	Christoffer Ehn	LW	L	30	2021	Lidköping, Sweden
18	(Canada)	Remi Elie	LW	L	31	2023	Green Valley, Ontario, Canada
5	(Sweden)	Oscar Fantenberg (C)	D	L	34	2022	Ljungby, Sweden
53	(Sweden)	Adam Hofbauer	C	L	23	2024	Bromma, Sweden
36	(Finland)	Waltteri Ignatjew	G	L	26	2025	Helsinki, Finland
93	(Sweden)	Oliver Johansson	C	L	22	2025	Sundsvall, Sweden
20	(Sweden)	Johan Johnsson	C	L	33	2024	Jönköping, Sweden
70	(Sweden)	Fredrik Karlström	C	L	28	2025	Stockholm, Sweden
48	(Finland)	Mikko Kokkonen	D	L	25	2025	Mikkeli, Finland
23	(Sweden)	Robin Kovács	LW	L	29	2024	Stockholm, Sweden
4	(Sweden)	Oscar Lawner	LW	L	25	2024	Karlstad, Sweden
81	(Sweden)	Theodor Lennström	D	L	31	2025	Stockholm, Sweden
61	(Sweden)	Markus Ljungh (A)	C	L	35	2020	Västerås, Sweden
26	(Canada)	Max Martin	D	L	26	2024	Winnipeg, Canada
31	(Sweden)	Jesper Myrenberg	G	L	26	2022	Täby, Sweden
8	(Sweden)	Jonathan Myrenberg	D	R	23	2021	Täby, Sweden
9	(Sweden)	Erik Norén	D	L	24	2024	Örebro, Sweden
92	(Sweden)	Zion Nybeck	LW	L	23	2025	Alvesta, Sweden
17	(Sweden)	Felix Öhrqvist	D	L	19	2023	Stockholm, Sweden
39	(Canada)	Ty Rattie	RW	R	33	2022	Calgary, Alberta, Canada
2	(Finland)	Rasmus Rissanen	D	L	34	2024	Kuopio, Finland
73	(United States)	Nick Shore	C	R	33	2024	Denver, Colorado, United States
38	(Sweden)	Johan Södergran	W	L	26	2025	Stockholm, Sweden
13	(Czech Republic)	Jakub Vrana	LW	L	30	2025	Prague, Czech Republic

Updated 11 August 2025.

== Luleå HF ==
No.	Nat	Player	Pos	S/G	Age	Acquired	Birthplace
3	(Canada)	Frédéric Allard	D	R	28	2023	Saint-Sauveur, Quebec, Canada
96	(Sweden)	Pontus Andreasson	C	L	27	2023	Munkedal, Sweden
86	(Sweden)	Mathias Bromé	W	L	31	2024	Örby, Sweden
14	(Sweden)	Jonas Berglund	C	L	35	2017	Älvsbyn, Sweden
10	(Sweden)	Einar Emanuelsson	RW	R	29	2016	Kiruna, Sweden
32	(Sweden)	Oscar Engsund	D	L	32	2025	Göteborg, Sweden
25	(Sweden)	Filip Eriksson	C	L	21	2025	Ljungby, Sweden
15	(Sweden)	David Granberg	C	L	20	2022	Piteå, Sweden
29	(Sweden)	Erik Gustafsson (C)	D	L	37	2018	Sundsvall, Sweden
8	(Sweden)	William Håkansson	D	L	18	2024	Solna, Sweden
6	(Sweden)	Isac Hedqvist	C	L	21	2022	Örnsköldsvik, Sweden
71	(Sweden)	Jakob Ihs-Wozniak	RW	R	19	2023	Adelaide, Australia
13	(Finland)	Eetu Koivistoinen	C	L	30	2024	Tampere, Finland
55	(Finland)	Kasper Kotkansalo	D	L	27	2025	Espoo, Finland
34	(Sweden)	Joel Lassinantti	G	L	33	2021	Luleå, Sweden
82	(Finland)	Otto Leskinen	D	L	29	2025	Pieksämäki, Finland
76	(Finland)	Anton Levtchi	LW	L	30	2024	Varkaus, Finland
9	(Finland)	Heikki Liedes	C	L	33	2025	Helsinki, Finland
51	(Finland)	Markus Nurmi	RW	R	27	2024	Turku, Finland
91	(United States)	Brian O'Neill	C	R	37	2024	Yardley, Pennsylvania, United States
23	(Sweden)	Jesper Sellgren	D	L	27	2022	Örnsköldsvik, Sweden
24	(Canada)	Brendan Shinnimin	C	L	35	2021	East St. Paul, Manitoba, Canada
39	(Sweden)	Pontus Själin	D	L	29	2015	Östersund, Sweden
31	(Sweden)	Matteus Ward	G	L	24	2022	Nyköping, Sweden

Updated 27 July 2025.

== Malmö Redhawks ==
No.	Nat	Player	Pos	S/G	Age	Acquired	Birthplace
49	(Canada)	Seth Barton	D	R	26	2025	Kelowna, British Columbia, Canada
20	(Norway)	Thomas Berg-Paulsen	C	L	26	2023	Stavanger, Norway
41	(Sweden)	Joseph Berger	D	L	26	2024	Visby, Sweden
24	(Sweden)	Filip Björkman	RW	L	22	2025	Eskilstuna, Sweden
16	(Germany)	Maximilian Eisenmenger	C	L	27	2025	Münster, Germany
78	(Czech Republic)	Robin Hanzl	C	L	37	2024	Ústí nad Labem, Czech Republic
63	(Sweden)	Fredrik Händemark (C)	C	L	32	2021	Björbo, Sweden
32	(Finland)	Joona Ikonen	RW	R	27	2024	Tampere, Finland
17	(Sweden)	Johan Ivarsson	D	L	30	2023	Höör, Sweden
22	(Finland)	Janne Kuokkanen	C	L	27	2025	Oulunsalo, Finland
94	(Czech Republic)	Marek Langhamer	G	L	31	2024	Moravská Třebová, Czech Republic
15	(Sweden)	Freddie Larsson	RW	L	22	2022	Helsingborg, Sweden
7	(Finland)	Topi Niemelä	D	R	24	2025	Oulun, Finland
26	(Sweden)	Patrik Norén	D	L	33	2025	Säter, Sweden
12	(Sweden)	Linus Öberg	RW	R	25	2024	Vänersborg, Sweden
48	(Finland)	Lauri Pajuniemi	RW	R	26	2025	Tampere, Finland
95	(Sweden)	Carl Persson	LW	L	30	2018	Kristianstad, Sweden
42	(Finland)	Robin Salo	D	L	27	2024	Espoo, Finland
4	(Sweden)	Martin Schreiber	D	L	23	2025	Karlskoga, Sweden
91	(Sweden)	Axel Sundberg	RW	R	27	2023	Stockholm, Sweden
13	(Norway)	Petter Vesterheim	C	L	21	2024	Lørenskog, Norway
6	(Finland)	Eemil Viro	D	L	24	2025	Vantaa, Finland
10	(Sweden)	William von Barnekow	F	L	23	2020	Malmö, Sweden

Last updated on 27 November 2025.

== Rögle BK ==
Updated 3 July 2025.

No.	Nat	Player	Pos	S/G	Age	Acquired	Birthplace
28	(Sweden)	Anton Bengtsson (C)	C	L	32	2019	Nässjö, Sweden
45	(Austria)	Gregor Biber	D	L	19	2024	Krems, Austria
67	(Sweden)	Leon Bristedt (A)	LW	L	31	2024	Stockholm, Sweden
23	(Canada)	Josh Dickinson	C	L	28	2024	Georgetown, Ontario, Canada
16	(Sweden)	Lucas Ekeståhl-Jonsson	D	L	30	2023	Stockholm, Sweden
18	(Sweden)	Dennis Everberg (A)	RW	L	34	2019	Västerås, Sweden
95	(Canada)	Mark Friedman	D	R	30	2025	Toronto, Ontario, Canada
24	(Sweden)	Mattias Göransson	D	L	31	2024	Grums, Sweden
75	(Sweden)	Arvid Holm	G	L	27	2024	Ljungby, Sweden
62	(Czech Republic)	Luboš Horký	RW	R	28	2024	Znojmo, Czech Republic
58	(Sweden)	Filip Johansson	D	R	26	2024	Västerås, Sweden
83	(United States)	Karson Kuhlman	RW	R	30	2025	Esko, Minnesota, United States
6	(United States)	Paul LaDue	D	R	33	2025	Grand Forks, North Dakota, United States
52	(Sweden)	Felix Nilsson	C	L	20	2023	Stockholm, Sweden
22	(Sweden)	Fredrik Olofsson	LW	L	29	2025	Helsingborg, Sweden
65	(Sweden)	Christoffer Rifalk	G	L	29	2019	Kalix, Sweden
8	(Sweden)	Linus Sandin	RW	R	29	2022	Uppsala, Sweden
51	(Sweden)	Calle Själin	D	L	26	2024	Östersund, Sweden
27	(Sweden)	Linus Sjödin	C	L	23	2020	Ängelholm, Sweden
32	(Sweden)	Isac Solberg	W	L	20	2024	Ljungby, Sweden
37	(Sweden)	Albin Sundsvik	C	L	25	2023	Stockholm, Sweden
72	(Sweden)	Daniel Zaar	RW	R	32	2022	Helsingborg, Sweden
41	(Sweden)	Simon Zether	C	R	20	2023	Helsingborg, Sweden

== Skellefteå AIK ==
Updated 28 July 2025.

No.	Nat	Player	Pos	S/G	Age	Acquired	Birthplace
29	(Denmark)	Mikkel Aagaard	LW	L	30	2025	Frederikshavn, Denmark
4	(Sweden)	Rasmus Bergqvist	D	L	20	2024	Skellefteå, Sweden
15	(Sweden)	Lars Bryggman	LW	L	33	2025	Umeå, Sweden
71	(Sweden)	Jonathan Davidsson	RW	R	29	2024	Tyresö, Sweden
57	(Sweden)	Emil Djuse	D	L	32	2025	Östersund, Sweden
6	(Sweden)	Måns Forsfjäll	D	L	23	2020	Skellefteå, Sweden
33	(Sweden)	Zeb Forsfjäll	C	L	21	2021	Skellefteå, Sweden
3	(Sweden)	Viktor Grahn	D	L	27	2025	Piteå, Sweden
7	(Sweden)	Frans Haara	D	R	22	2023	Haparanda, Sweden
96	(Sweden)	Rickard Hugg (A)	LW	L	27	2019	Hudiksvall, Sweden
25	(Sweden)	Pontus Johansson	D	L	24	2024	Stockholm, Sweden
22	(Sweden)	Jonathan Johnson	C	L	33	2020	Gävle, Sweden
14	(Sweden)	Andreas Johnsson	LW	L	31	2023	Gävle, Sweden
43	(Norway)	Max Krogdahl	D	R	27	2025	Bærum, Norway
31	(Finland)	Jani Lampinen	G	L	23	2025	Vantaa, Finland
91	(Sweden)	Victor Laz	C	L	29	2025	Ronneby, Sweden
24	(Sweden)	Oscar Lindberg	C	L	34	2023	Skellefteå, Sweden
12	(Sweden)	Valter Lindberg	C	L	19	2024	Skellefteå, Sweden
17	(Sweden)	Pär Lindholm (A)	C	L	34	2022	Kusmark, Sweden
30	(Sweden)	Gustaf Lindvall	G	L	35	2016	Skellefteå, Sweden
52	(Sweden)	Arvid Lundberg	D	L	32	2022	Skellefteå, Sweden
8	(Slovakia)	Oliver Okuliar	LW	L	25	2025	Trenčín, Slovakia
64	(Sweden)	Jonathan Pudas (C)	D	R	33	2021	Kiruna, Sweden
9	(Sweden)	Victor Stjernborg	C	L	22	2025	Malmö, Sweden
32	(Sweden)	Linus Söderström	G	L	29	2022	Stockholm, Sweden
27	(Sweden)	Oskar Vuollet	C	L	20	2023	Skellefteå, Sweden

== Timrå IK ==
Updated: 28 July 2025.

No.	Nat	Player	Pos	S/G	Age	Acquired	Birthplace
23	(Sweden)	Jeremy Boyce	C	L	32	2010	Stockholm, Sweden
54	(Sweden)	Jonathan Dahlén (A)	LW	L	28	2022	Östersund, Sweden
12	(Sweden)	Linus Eriksson	C	L	20	2025	Stockholm, Sweden
4	(Sweden)	Tim Erixon	D	L	35	2021	Port Chester, New York, United States
28	(Sweden)	Simon Forsmark	D	L	22	2022	Kumla, Sweden
34	(Sweden)	Alfons Freij	D	L	20	2025	Sölvesborg, Sweden
18	(Sweden)	Eddie Genborg	LW	L	19	2025	Trollhättan, Sweden
7	(Sweden)	Marcus Hardegård	D	L	29	2025	Älvsbyn, Sweden
94	(Sweden)	Sebastian Hartmann	RW	R	31	2019	Uppsala, Sweden
26	(Sweden)	Anton Heikkinen	LW	L	25	2025	Nässjö, Sweden
30	(Sweden)	Jacob Johansson	G	L	32	2020	Stockholm, Sweden
31	(Sweden)	Tim Juel	G	L	31	2023	Svenstavik, Sweden
33	(Finland)	Ilari Kapanen	D	L	18	2024	Sundsvall, Sweden
51	(Sweden)	Anton Lander (C)	C	L	35	2022	Sundsvall, Sweden
27	(Sweden)	Ludvig Levinsson	C	L	24	2025	Härryda, Sweden
10	(Sweden)	David Lilja	LW	L	26	2025	Karlskoga, Sweden
25	(Sweden)	Linus Nässén	D	L	27	2024	Norrtälje, Sweden
14	(Sweden)	Emil Pettersson	C	L	32	2022	Sundsvall, Sweden
16	(Sweden)	Lukas Pilö	D	R	26	2024	Eskilstuna, Sweden
91	(Sweden)	Magnus Pääjärvi	LW	L	35	2022	Norrköping, Sweden
74	(Sweden)	Emil Stadin	D	L	19	2025	Sundsvall, Sweden
9	(Sweden)	Didrik Strömberg (A)	D	L	32	2021	Sundsvall, Sweden
38	(Sweden)	Albin Sundin	D	R	21	2025	Kungsbacka, Sweden
2	(Sweden)	Per Svensson	D	L	37	2020	Oskarshamn, Sweden
24	(Sweden)	Erik Walli-Walterholm	LW	L	27	2020	Stockholm, Sweden
57	(Sweden)	Anton Wedin	LW	L	33	2022	Sundsvall, Sweden
19	(Sweden)	Marcus Westfält	C	L	26	2025	Stockholm, Sweden

== Växjö Lakers ==
No.	Nat	Player	Pos	S/G	Age	Acquired	Birthplace
21	(United States)	Brian Cooper	D	L	32	2022	Anchorage, Alaska, United States
25	(Sweden)	Lucas Elvenes	LW	L	26	2025	Ängelholm, Sweden
19	(Canada)	Reid Gardiner	RW	R	30	2025	Prince Albert, Saskatchewan, Canada
8	(United States)	Zach Giuttari	D	R	30	2023	Warwick, Rhode Island, United States
6	(Sweden)	Petter Granberg	D	R	33	2024	Gällivare, Sweden
28	(Sweden)	Hugo Gustafsson	C	L	26	2021	Södertälje, Sweden
24	(Sweden)	Karl Henriksson	C	L	25	2024	Malmö, Sweden
53	(Sweden)	Kevin Israelsson	D	R	21	2024	Grönskär, Sweden
12	(Finland)	Otto Koivula	LW	L	27	2024	Nokia, Finland
42	(Sweden)	Kalle Kratz	C	L	21	2025	Orsa, Sweden
4	(Canada)	Keegan Lowe (A)	D	L	33	2022	Greenwich, Connecticut, United States
13	(United States)	Dylan McLaughlin	C	L	30	2023	Lancaster, New York, United States
41	(Sweden)	Ludvig Nilsson	LW	L	32	2019	Stockholm, Sweden
94	(Sweden)	Joel Persson (C)	D	R	32	2020	Kristianstad, Sweden
32	(Sweden)	Ludvig Persson	G	L	26	2025	Göteborg, Sweden
40	(Sweden)	Dennis Rasmussen	C	L	35	2024	Västerås, Sweden
91	(Canada)	Félix Robert	C	L	26	2024	Lac-Mégantic, Quebec, Canada
36	(Sweden)	Elias Rosén	D	L	27	2023	Landshut, Germany
29	(Sweden)	Sebastian Strandberg	C	L	33	2024	Visingsö, Sweden
10	(Finland)	Eemeli Suomi	C	L	30	2025	Tampere, Finland
16	(Sweden)	Ville Svensson	C	L	20	2023	Kalmar, Sweden
49	(Sweden)	Leo Sahlin Wallenius	D	L	20	2024	Skövde, Sweden
62	(Sweden)	Manuel Ågren	LW	L	32	2022	Oskarshamn, Sweden
70	(Sweden)	Adam Åhman	G	L	26	2021	Västervik, Sweden

Updated 29 July 2025.

== Örebro HK ==
No.	Nat	Player	Pos	S/G	Age	Acquired	Birthplace
28	(Sweden)	Linus Arnesson	D	L	31	2023	Stockholm, Sweden
31	(Norway)	Jonas Arntzen	G	L	28	2019	Oslo, Norway
5	(Sweden)	Gustav Backström (A)	D	L	31	2013	Lindesberg, Sweden
6	(Sweden)	Filip Berglund	D	R	28	2022	Skellefteå, Sweden
14	(Sweden)	Liam Danielsson	RW	R	19	2024	Gävle, Sweden
1	(Sweden)	Jhonas Enroth	G	L	37	2020	Stockholm, Sweden
44	(Sweden)	Melvin Fernström	RW	R	20	2023	Bålsta, Sweden
37	(Sweden)	Glenn Gustafsson (C)	LW	L	27	2023	Stockholm, Sweden
41	(Sweden)	Theodor Hallquisth	D	R	18	2024	Täby, Sweden
89	(Sweden)	Patrik Karlkvist	RW	R	33	2024	Trosa, Sweden
11	(Finland)	Kalle Kossila	C	L	33	2024	Neuilly-sur-Seine, France
19	(United States)	Sean Malone	C	L	31	2025	Buffalo, New York, United States
7	(United States)	Luke Martin	D	R	27	2025	St. Louis, Missouri, United States
33	(Sweden)	Christopher Mastomäki	C	L	29	2017	Nacka, Sweden
9	(Sweden)	Niklas Nilsson	D	L	22	2021	Tyresö, Sweden
39	(Sweden)	Milton Oscarson	RW	L	23	2020	Örebro, Sweden
23	(Sweden)	Egor Polin	LW	R	22	2025	Pervouralsk, Russia
21	(Finland)	Patrik Puistola	RW	L	25	2024	Tampere, Finland
55	(Canada)	David Quenneville	D	R	28	2024	Edmonton, Alberta, Canada
10	(Finland)	Sampo Ranta	W	L	25	2025	Naantali, Finland
27	(Finland)	Peetro Seppälä	D	L	25	2024	Kuusankoski, Finland
12	(Norway)	Noah Steen	LW	L	21	2024	Oslo, Norway
77	(Finland)	Teemu Turunen	LW	L	30	2025	Helsinki, Finland
17	(Sweden)	William Wikman	LW	L	28	2022	Danderyd, Sweden

Updated 31 July 2025.
