= 2025–26 HockeyAllsvenskan season =

- League: HockeyAllsvenskan
- Sport: Ice hockey
- Duration: 19 September 2025 – 6 March 2026 (regular season)
- Teams: 14
- TV partner: TV4
- First place: IF Björklöven
- Top scorer: Scott Pooley (AIK)
- Promoted to SHL: IF Björklöven
- Relegated to Hockeyettan: IF Troja-Ljungby

HockeyAllsvenskan seasons
- 2024–25 2026–27

The 2025–26 HockeyAllsvenskan season was the 21st season of HockeyAllsvenskan, the second-highest professional ice hockey league in Sweden. The season consisted of 14 teams playing a regular season in which each team played each other team four times; twice at home and twice away. The regular season is followed by a series of promotion and relegation tournaments, with the teams finishing first through tenth participating in promotion playoffs, and those finishing thirteenth and fourteenth forced to requalify to avoid relegation to Hockeyettan.

For the 2025–26 season, there were the following team movements. Djurgårdens IF was promoted to the SHL as reigning 2025 HockeyAllsvenskan champions, while Modo Hockey was relegated from the SHL. Tingsryds AIF lost in the play-out and were demoted to the Hockeyettan with IF Troja-Ljungby promoted in their place.

== Participating teams ==
HockeyAllsvenskan team map

Team	City	Arena	Capacity
AIK	Stockholm	Hovet	8,094
Almtuna IS	Uppsala	Upplands Bilforum Arena	2,800
IF Björklöven	Umeå	Visionite Arena	5,400
Kalmar HC	Kalmar	Hatstore Arena	2,500
BIK Karlskoga	Karlskoga	Nobelhallen	6,300
Modo Hockey	Örnsköldsvik	Hägglunds Arena	7,265
Mora IK	Mora	Smidjegrav Arena	4,500
Nybro Vikings	Nybro	Liljas Arena	2,380
IK Oskarshamn	Oskarshamn	Be-Ge Hockey Center	3,275
Södertälje SK	Södertälje	Scaniarinken	6,200
IF Troja-Ljungby	Ljungby	Ljungby Arena	3,620
Västerås IK	Västerås	ABB Arena Nord	4,902
Vimmerby HC	Vimmerby	VBO Arena	1,750
Östersunds IK	Östersund	Östersund Arena	2,700

== Regular season ==
=== Standings ===
Pos	Team	Pld	W	OTW	OTL	L	GF	GA	GD	Pts	Qualification or relegation
1	IF Björklöven	52	34	7	3	8	192	97	+95	119	Advance to the Quarterfinals
2	Kalmar HC	52	34	3	5	10	189	110	+79	113	Advance to the Quarterfinals
3	BIK Karlskoga	52	26	8	3	15	145	115	+30	97	Advance to the Quarterfinals
4	Modo Hockey	52	24	7	5	16	141	134	+7	91	Advance to the Quarterfinals
5	AIK	52	22	7	5	18	150	152	−2	85	Advance to the Quarterfinals
6	Nybro Vikings	52	19	6	6	21	139	159	−20	75	Advance to the Quarterfinals
7	Södertälje SK	52	20	2	9	21	130	130	0	73	Advance to the Eighth-finals
8	IK Oskarshamn	52	21	2	5	24	143	139	+4	72	Advance to the Eighth-finals
9	Almtuna IS	52	18	7	4	23	127	152	−25	72	Advance to the Eighth-finals
10	Mora IK	52	14	10	8	20	134	147	−13	70	Advance to the Eighth-finals
11	Östersunds IK	52	16	5	6	25	123	153	−30	64	
12	Vimmerby HC	52	14	7	5	26	111	148	−37	61	
13	Västerås IK	52	13	4	7	28	125	155	−30	54	Advance to Play Out
14	IF Troja-Ljungby	52	9	5	9	29	123	181	−58	46	Advance to Play Out

Updated to match(es) played on 6 March 2026. Source: swehockey.se

== Post-season ==
=== Playoff bracket ===
Eighth-finals; Swedish: Åttondelsfinal
7	Södertälje SK	2
10	Mora IK	0
8	IK Oskarshamn	2
9	Almtuna IS	0

Quarterfinals; Swedish: Kvartsfinal
1	IF Björklöven	4
8	IK Oskarshamn	0
2	Kalmar HC	3
7	Södertälje SK	4
3	BIK Karlskoga	4
6	Nybro Vikings	0
4	Modo Hockey	4
5	AIK	2

Semifinals
1	IF Björklöven	4
7	Södertälje SK	1
(Pairings are re-seeded after the first and second round)
3	BIK Karlskoga	4
4	Modo Hockey	3

Finals
1	IF Björklöven	4
3	BIK Karlskoga	0

=== Semifinals ===
The winners of the quarterfinals play best-of-seven series, with the winners moving on to the Finals. The highest-seeded team chose whether to play the second-lowest seed or the lowest seed. In each series the higher-seeded team has home-ice advantage, playing at home for games 1 and 2 (plus 5 and 7 if necessary) while the lower-seeded team plays at home for games 3 and 4 (plus 6 if necessary).

==== (1) IF Björklöven vs. (7) Södertälje SK ====
31 March	IF Björklöven	3–2	Södertälje SK	Winpos Arena	Recap

2 April	IF Björklöven	3–2	OT	Södertälje SK	Winpos Arena	Recap

4 April	Södertälje SK	4–2	IF Björklöven	Scaniarinken	Recap

6 April	Södertälje SK	0–2	IF Björklöven	Scaniarinken	Recap

8 April	IF Björklöven	4–1	Södertälje SK	Winpos Arena	Recap

IF Björklöven win series 4–1

==== (3) BIK Karlskoga vs. (4) Modo Hockey ====
1 April	BIK Karlskoga	1–2	Modo Hockey	Nobelhallen	Recap

3 April	BIK Karlskoga	5–3	Modo Hockey	Nobelhallen	Recap

5 April	Modo Hockey	0–2	BIK Karlskoga	Hägglunds Arena	Recap

7 April	Modo Hockey	4–0	BIK Karlskoga	Hägglunds Arena	Recap

9 April	BIK Karlskoga	3–5	Modo Hockey	Nobelhallen	Recap

11 April	Modo Hockey	1–3	BIK Karlskoga	Hägglunds Arena	Recap

13 April	BIK Karlskoga	4–1	Modo Hockey	Nobelhallen	Recap

BIK Karlskoga win series 4–3

=== Finals ===
The winners of the semifinals will play a best-of-seven series, with the winner being promoted to the Swedish Hockey League (SHL). The higher-seeded team has home-ice advantage, playing at home for games 1 and 2 (plus 5 and 7 if necessary) while the lower-seeded team play at home for games 3 and 4 (plus 6 if necessary).

==== (1) IF Björklöven vs. (3) BIK Karlskoga ====
15 April	IF Björklöven	4–2	BIK Karlskoga	Winpos Arena	Recap
Oscar Tellström (1; SHG) – 11:53		First period	15:28 – Gustaf Thorell (5; PPG)
Daniel Brodin (3; PPG) – 2:11; Oscar Tellström (2) – 6:24		Second period	10:43 – Jonatan Lundgren (1)
Gustav Possler (4; SHG, ENG) – 19:46		Third period	No scoring
Frans Tuohimaa (23 saves / 25 shots)		Goalie stats	Olof Lindbom (21 saves / 24 shots)

17 April	IF Björklöven	4–2	BIK Karlskoga	Winpos Arena	Recap
Marcus Nilsson (2) – 19:54		First period	No scoring
Lenni Killinen (3) – 3:33; Fredrik Forsberg (5) – 10:21		Second period	7:47 – Eero Teräväinen (2; PPG)
Lenni Killinen (4; ENG) – 19:01		Third period	12:29 – Tim Barkemo (4)
Frans Tuohimaa (21 saves / 23 shots)		Goalie stats	Lars Volden (23 saves / 26 shots)

20 April	BIK Karlskoga	4–5	IF Björklöven	Nobelhallen	Recap
Eero Teräväinen (3) – 7:44; Gustaf Franzén (1) – 11:45; Sander Vold Engebråten (1) – 14:17		First period	10:41 – Joel Mustonen (2); 17:58 – Liam Dower Nilsson (2)
Jonatan Harju (3) – 7:25		Second period	4:54 – Albin Lundin (1; PPG)
No scoring		Third period	15:04 – Marcus Björk (2; PPG); 17:49 – Fredrik Forsberg (6)
Lars Volden (20 saves / 25 shots)		Goalie stats	Frans Tuohimaa (12 saves / 16 shots)

22 April	BIK Karlskoga	3–7	IF Björklöven	Nobelhallen	Recap
No scoring		First period	12:32 – Joel Mustonen (3); 13:51 – Anton Malmström (2)
Jonatan Harju (4) – 3:55; Henrik Björklund (9) – 5:58		Second period	1:48 – Albin Lundin (2; SHG); 3:32 – Oscar Tellström (3; PPG)
Sander Vold Engebråten (2) – 13:35		Third period	1:14 – Daniel Brodin (4; PPG); 6:17 – Oscar Tellström (4); 12:36 – Lucas Nordsäter (3; ENG)
{{|Olof Lindbom (7 saves / 9 shots)|Lars Volden (6 saves / 10 shots)}}		Goalie stats	Frans Tuohimaa (25 saves / 28 shots)

IF Bjöklöven win series 4–0

=== Play Out ===
Teams 13 and 14 from the regular season will play a best-of-seven series, with the winner remaining in HockeyAllsvenskan and the loser being relegated to Hockeyettan. The higher-seeded team has home-ice advantage, playing at home for games 1 and 2 (plus 5 and 7 if necessary) while the lower-seeded team plays at home for games 3 and 4 (plus 6 if necessary).

==== (13) Västerås IK vs. (14) IF Troja-Ljungby ====
12 March	Västerås IK	6–2	IF Troja-Ljungby	ABB Arena Nord	Recap

14 March	Västerås IK	2–1	OT	IF Troja-Ljungby	ABB Arena Nord	Recap

17 March	IF Troja-Ljungby	3–4	Västerås IK	Ljungby Arena	Recap

19 March	IF Troja-Ljungby	4–3	OT	Västerås IK	Ljungby Arena	Recap

21 March	Västerås IK	4–3	IF Troja-Ljungby	ABB Arena Nord	Recap

Västerås IK wins series 4–1
