= Elliot Ekmark =

Swedish ice hockey player (born 2002)

- Born: 29 January 2002 (age 24) Linköping, Sweden
- Height: 5 ft 9 in (175 cm)
- Weight: 162 lb (73 kg; 11 st 8 lb)
- Position: Centre
- Shoots: Left
- Allsv team Former teams: Kalmar HC; Linköping HC; HV71
- NHL draft: 198th overall, 2020; Florida Panthers
- Playing career: 2020–present

Elliot Ekmark (born 29 January 2002) is a Swedish professional ice hockey centre for Kalmar HC in the HockeyAllsvenskan (Allsv).

== Playing career ==
Ekmark made his professional debut during the 2019–20 season where he appeared in four games for Linköping HC. He was drafted in the seventh round, 198th overall, by the Florida Panthers in the 2020 NHL entry draft.

On 25 April 2025, Ekmark left Linköping HC to sign a two-year contract with Allsvenskan club, Kalmar HC.

== International play ==
Ekmark will represent Sweden at the 2022 World Junior Ice Hockey Championships.

== Career statistics ==
=== Regular season and playoffs ===
			Regular season					Playoffs
Season	Team	League	GP	G	A	Pts	PIM	GP	G	A	Pts	PIM
2018–19	Linköpings HC	J20	7	1	3	4	0	—	—	—	—	—
2019–20	Linköping HC	J20	31	12	14	26	6	—	—	—	—	—
2019–20	Linköping HC	SHL	4	0	0	0	0	—	—	—	—	—
2020–21	Linköping HC	J20	7	2	8	10	0	—	—	—	—	—
2020–21	Linköping HC	SHL	31	1	0	1	2	—	—	—	—	—
2021–22	Linköping HC	J20	7	4	2	6	8	2	0	1	1	0
2021–22	Linköping HC	SHL	44	2	1	3	12	—	—	—	—	—
2021–22	Västerviks IK	Allsv	3	1	0	1	2	—	—	—	—	—
2022–23	Linköping HC	J20	8	2	3	5	6	—	—	—	—	—
2021–22	Linköping HC	SHL	7	1	2	3	0	—	—	—	—	—
2022–23	IF Björklöven	Allsv	16	2	1	3	0	9	0	1	1	0
2023–24	Almtuna IS	Allsv	51	9	21	30	35	2	0	0	0	0
2024–25	Almtuna IS	Allsv	42	11	9	20	10	—	—	—	—	—
2024–25	HV71	SHL	2	0	0	0	2	—	—	—	—	—
2024–25	Linköping HC	SHL	10	1	0	1	0	—	—	—	—	—
SHL totals			98	5	3	8	16	—	—	—	—	—

=== International ===
Year	Team	Event	Result	GP	G	A	Pts	PIM
2018	Sweden	U17	3rd place, bronze medalist(s)	6	1	0	1	0
2019	Sweden	HG18	3rd place, bronze medalist(s)	5	1	0	1	0
Junior totals				11	2	0	2	0
