= Carl-Johan Lerby =

Swedish ice hockey player (born 1997)

- Born: 7 July 1997 (age 27); Trelleborg, Sweden
- Height: 5 ft 11 in (180 cm)
- Weight: 181 lb (82 kg; 12 st 13 lb)
- Position: Defenceman
- Shoots: Left
- Allsv team Former teams: Kalmar HC; Malmö Redhawks; Stockton Heat; Vaasan Sport; IF Björklöven
- NHL draft: Undrafted
- Playing career: 2016–present

Carl-Johan Lerby is a Swedish ice hockey defenceman who currently plays for Kalmar HC in the HockeyAllsvenskan (Allsv).

== Playing career ==
Lerby played as a youth within the Malmö Redhawks organization of the SHL, where he made his senior level debut in 2016.

He spent the 2020–21 season in North America with the Stockton Heat, the American Hockey League (AHL) affiliate of the Calgary Flames of the National Hockey League (NHL) before returning to the Redhawks.

== Career statistics ==
			Regular season					Playoffs
Season	Team	League	GP	G	A	Pts	PIM	GP	G	A	Pts	PIM
2014–15	Malmö Redhawks	J20	31	1	4	5	12	1	0	0	0	0
2015–16	Malmö Redhawks	J20	32	3	11	14	20	3	0	0	0	0
2015–16	Malmö Redhawks	SHL	5	0	0	0	0	—	—	—	—	—
2015–16	Tyringe SoSS	Div.1	2	0	1	1	0	—	—	—	—	—
2016–17	Malmö Redhawks	J20	7	1	4	5	2	—	—	—	—	—
2016–17	Malmö Redhawks	SHL	45	2	2	4	2	13	1	0	1	0
2016–17	IK Pantern	Allsv	7	1	1	2	2	—	—	—	—	—
2017–18	Malmö Redhawks	SHL	22	3	3	6	10	—	—	—	—	—
2017–18	IK Pantern	Allsv	5	1	0	1	2	—	—	—	—	—
2018–19	Malmö Redhawks	SHL	47	5	16	21	20	5	0	3	3	0
2019–20	Malmö Redhawks	SHL	44	4	12	16	24	—	—	—	—	—
2020–21	Stockton Heat	AHL	22	0	7	7	14	—	—	—	—	—
2021–22	Malmö Redhawks	SHL	51	3	6	9	24	—	—	—	—	—
2022–23	Malmö Redhawks	SHL	35	2	11	13	10	—	—	—	—	—
2023–24	Vaasan Sport	Liiga	20	1	3	4	4	—	—	—	—	—
2023–24	IF Björklöven	Allsv	25	2	9	11	8	5	0	0	0	2
2024–25	Kalmar HC	Allsv	46	10	22	32	44	5	0	3	3	4
SHL totals			249	19	50	69	90	18	1	3	4	0
