= Collin Delia =

American ice hockey player (born 1994)

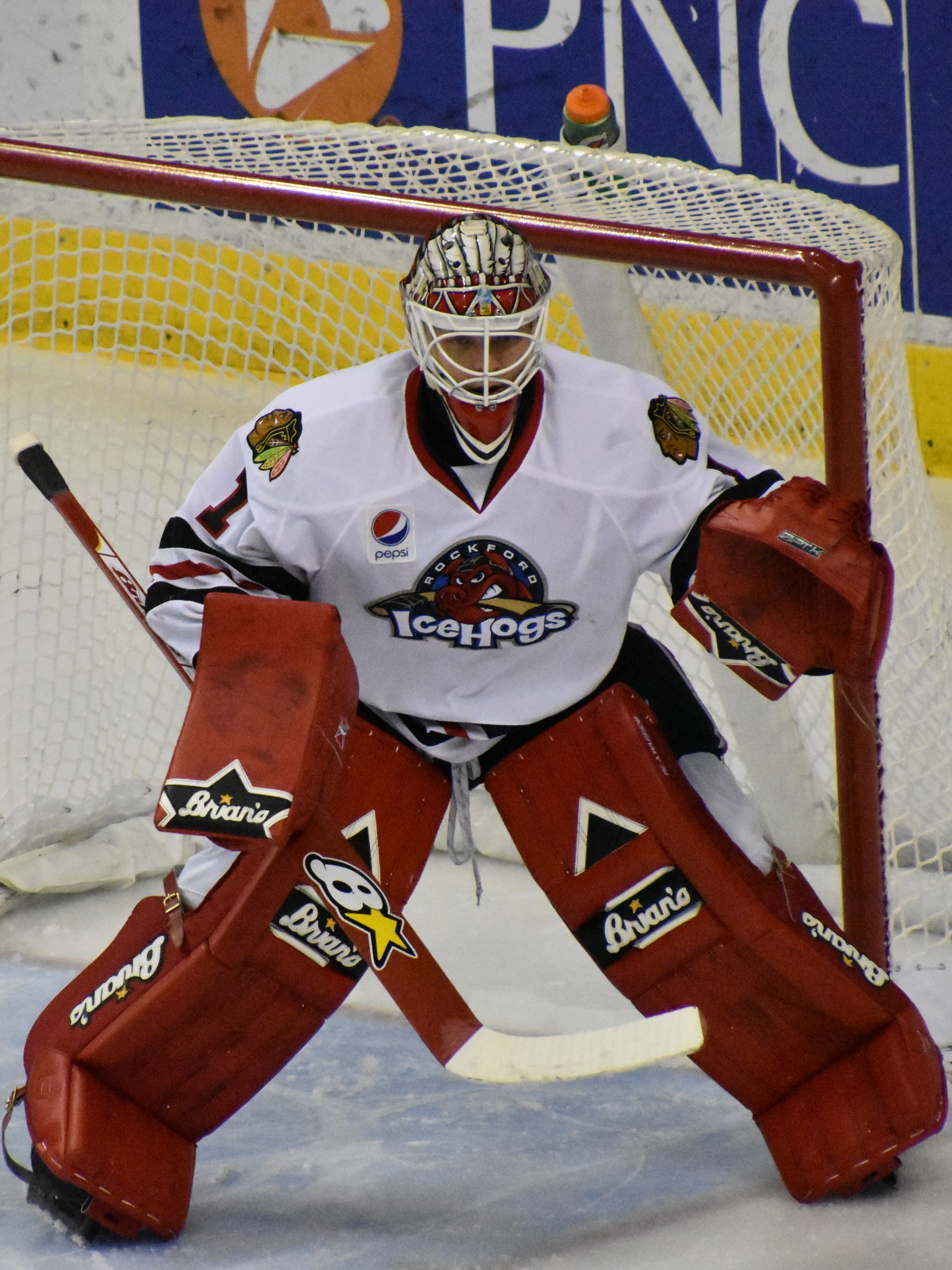
- Delia with the Rockford IceHogs in 2018
- Born: June 20, 1994 (age 32) Rancho Cucamonga, California, U.S.
- Height: 6 ft 2 in (188 cm)
- Weight: 208 lb (94 kg; 14 st 12 lb)
- Position: Goaltender
- Catches: Left
- ECHL team Former teams: Norfolk Admirals; Chicago Blackhawks; Vancouver Canucks; Brynäs IF; Kalmar HC
- NHL draft: Undrafted
- Playing career: 2017–present

Collin Delia (born June 20, 1994) is an American professional ice hockey goaltender for Norfolk Admirals of the East Coast Hockey League (ECHL). He previously played in the National Hockey League (NHL) for the Chicago Blackhawks and Vancouver Canucks.

== Playing career ==
Delia grew up playing youth hockey in Southern California before moving to the Amarillo Bulls of the North American Hockey League (NAHL). In 2013, Delia committed to play Division 1 collegiate hockey with Merrimack College of the Hockey East.

In his freshman season with the Merrimack Warriors, Delia served as a backup goaltender and was limited to nine games. In his sophomore season, Delia played in 15 games before suffering an injury. He completed the season with 26 games, a new career-high 600 saves, and a .889 save percentage.

In his junior season, Delia started 21 games for the Merrimack Warriors, finishing the season with a new season high in wins and a 9–8–3 record. Afterwards, he was named to the Hockey East Third Team All-Star. Upon completing his junior season with the Warriors in the 2016–17 season, Delia left Merrimack in signing a two-year, entry-level contract with the Chicago Blackhawks on July 28, 2017.

During the 2017–18 season, Delia initially played with the Blackhawks' AHL and ECHL affiliates in the Rockford IceHogs and Indy Fuel. He was later recalled by the Blackhawks following an injury to starter Corey Crawford, serving as backup to Anton Forsberg. After Forsberg was injured in pregame warmups, Delia made his NHL debut on March 29, 2018 against the Winnipeg Jets. Delia himself was injured early in the third period, forcing Scott Foster, whom the Blackhawks had signed to an emergency one-day contract (NHL rules require every team to have a backup goaltender dressed), to play the last 14 minutes of the game, which the Blackhawks eventually won 6–2

Delia began the 2018–19 season with the IceHogs after attending the Blackhawks training camp. He was recalled in December after starter Corey Crawford suffered an injury. On February 11, 2019, the Blackhawks signed Delia to a three-year, $3 million contract extension. He was reassigned to the AHL on February 25 but was recalled again on March 5, on an emergency basis. After he helped the Blackhawks hold on for a 5–4 win over the Toronto Maple Leafs on March 13, Delia was reassigned to the IceHogs.

Delia left the Blackhawks organization after five season and signed a one-year, $750,000 contract with the Vancouver Canucks on July 13, 2022. Beginning the 2022–23 season in the AHL with affiliate, the Abbotsford Canucks, Delia was later recalled to the Canucks and assumed the backup role in establishing career bests with 10 wins through 20 appearances.

On July 1, 2023, Delia left the Canucks and was signed to a one-year, $775,000 contract with the Winnipeg Jets for the 2023–24 season. He was assigned and remained with AHL affiliate, the Manitoba Moose for the duration of the season, posting an 11-19-1 record through 32 appearances.

Delia left the Jets to sign a one-year, two-way contract with the Edmonton Oilers for the 2024–25 season on July 1, 2024. Delia spent the season with the Oiler's AHL affiliate, the Bakersfield Condors, where he posted a 12–11–5 record with a 2.76 goals-against average and a .906 save percentage.

Delia signed a one-year deal with Swedish club, Brynäs IF of the Swedish Hockey League, on July 11, 2025. He ended up splitting the year between Brynäs and Kalmar HC of HockeyAllsvenskan.

He returned to North America for the 2026-27 season after he signed with the Norfolk Admirals of the ECHL.

== Career statistics ==
			Regular season									Playoffs
Season	Team	League	GP	W	L	OTL	MIN	GA	SO	GAA	SV%	GP	W	L	MIN	GA	SO	GAA	SV%
2012–13	Amarillo Bulls	NAHL	19	11	2	2	981	37	3	2.26	.899	1	—	—	—	—	—	0.00	1.000
2013–14	Amarillo Bulls	NAHL	31	22	7	0	1,723	46	7	1.60	.937	6	—	—	—	—	—	2.38	.931
2014–15	Merrimack College	HE	9	4	4	1	517	16	1	1.86	.937	—	—	—	—	—	—	—	—
2015–16	Merrimack College	HE	26	8	12	6	1,521	75	0	2.96	.889	—	—	—	—	—	—	—	—
2016–17	Merrimack College	HE	21	9	8	3	1,202	43	3	2.15	.927	—	—	—	—	—	—	—	—
2017–18	Indy Fuel	ECHL	10	1	7	2	539	37	0	4.12	.887	—	—	—	—	—	—	—	—
2017–18	Rockford IceHogs	AHL	28	17	7	4	1,675	76	1	2.72	.900	10	7	3	667	26	0	2.34	.924
2017–18	Chicago Blackhawks	NHL	2	1	1	0	106	7	0	3.96	.889	—	—	—	—	—	—	—	—
2018–19	Rockford IceHogs	AHL	26	13	8	4	1,547	64	0	2.48	.922	—	—	—	—	—	—	—	—
2018–19	Chicago Blackhawks	NHL	16	6	4	3	832	50	0	3.61	.908	—	—	—	—	—	—	—	—
2019–20	Rockford IceHogs	AHL	32	16	13	1	1,824	81	3	2.66	.912	—	—	—	—	—	—	—	—
2020–21	Chicago Blackhawks	NHL	6	1	3	1	335	20	0	3.59	.902	—	—	—	—	—	—	—	—
2020–21	Rockford IceHogs	AHL	4	2	2	0	209	18	0	5.16	.858	—	—	—	—	—	—	—	—
2021–22	Rockford IceHogs	AHL	22	11	9	2	1,281	65	1	3.04	.905	—	—	—	—	—	—	—	—
2021–22	Chicago Blackhawks	NHL	8	1	4	1	344	22	0	3.85	.899	—	—	—	—	—	—	—	—
2022–23	Abbotsford Canucks	AHL	9	6	3	0	531	30	0	3.39	.888	—	—	—	—	—	—	—	—
2022–23	Vancouver Canucks	NHL	20	10	6	2	1,136	62	0	3.28	.882	—	—	—	—	—	—	—	—
2023–24	Manitoba Moose	AHL	32	11	19	1	1,809	107	0	3.55	.872	—	—	—	—	—	—	—	—
2024–25	Bakersfield Condors	AHL	28	12	11	3	1,631	75	2	2.76	.906	—	—	—	—	—	—	—	—
2025-26	Brynäs IF	SHL	6	1	4	0	340	22	0	3.87	.791	—	—	—	—	—	—	—	—
2025–26	Kalmar HC	HockeyAllsvenskan	2	2	0	0	120	3	0	1.50	.932	—	—	—	—	—	—	—	—
NHL totals			52	19	18	7	2,751	161	0	3.51	.897	—	—	—	—	—	—	—	—

== Awards and honors ==
Award	Year
NAHL
Robertson Cup champion	2013
Community Service Award	2014
College
Hockey East Third Team All-Star	2017
Hockey East Goaltending Champion	2017
HE Goaltender of the Month (January)	2017
New England D1 All-Stars	2017
AHL
Rockford IceHogs Man of The Year	2018

Awards and achievements
Preceded by Kevin Boyle	Hockey East Goaltending Champion; 2016–17	Succeeded by Cayden Primeau
