= Johan Johnsson =

Johan Johnsson may refer to:

- Johan Johnsson (ice hockey) (born 1993), Swedish ice hockey player
- Johan Johnsson (footballer), Swedish footballer
