= Per Svensson =

Per Svensson may refer to:

- Per Svensson (actor) (born 1965), Swedish actor
- Per Svensson (ice hockey) (born 1988), Swedish ice hockey defenceman
- Per-Olof Svensson (born 1942), Swedish politician
- Per Oskar Svensson, a.k.a. Pelle Svensson (born 1943), Swedish Greco-Roman wrestling and Olympic silver medalist
