= Martin Johansson (ice hockey, born 1975) =

Swedish ice hockey player

- Born: April 16, 1975 (age 51) Umeå, Sweden
- Height: 6 ft 0 in (183 cm)
- Weight: 185 lb (84 kg; 13 st 3 lb)
- Position: Defence
- Shot: Right
- Played for: IF Björklöven; Modo Hockey; Stavanger Oilers
- Playing career: 1994–2014

Martin Johansson (born April 16, 1975) is a Swedish former professional ice hockey defenceman. He most notably played with IF Björklöven and Modo Hockey in the Swedish Hockey League (SHL).

Johansson made his Elitserien debut playing with IF Björklöven during the 1993–94 Elitserien season.

== Career statistics ==
			Regular season					Playoffs
Season	Team	League	GP	G	A	Pts	PIM	GP	G	A	Pts	PIM
1993–94	IF Björklöven	Elitserien	1	0	0	0	0	—	—	—	—	—
1994–95	IF Björklöven	Division 1	6	0	0	0	2	—	—	—	—	—
1995–96	IF Björklöven J20	J20 SuperElit	5	1	0	1	2	—	—	—	—	—
1995–96	IF Björklöven	Division 1	18	2	4	6	14	8	5	0	5	8
1996–97	IF Björklöven	Division 1	32	4	10	14	10	10	1	0	1	6
1997–98	IF Björklöven	Division 1	32	5	6	11	20	14	0	1	1	6
1998–99	IF Björklöven	Elitserien	47	3	7	10	8	—	—	—	—	—
1999–00	IF Björklöven	Allsvenskan	46	1	9	10	28	10	1	2	3	8
2000–01	IF Björklöven	Elitserien	50	5	12	17	22	—	—	—	—	—
2001–02	MODO Hockey J20	J20 SuperElit	1	0	0	0	0	—	—	—	—	—
2001–02	MODO Hockey	Elitserien	42	0	1	1	10	5	0	0	0	4
2001–02	IF Björklöven	Allsvenskan	3	0	3	3	0	—	—	—	—	—
2002–03	MODO Hockey	Elitserien	49	7	4	11	24	5	0	0	0	0
2003–04	MODO Hockey	Elitserien	49	3	8	11	14	3	1	0	1	0
2004–05	Skellefteå AIK	Allsvenskan	46	7	11	18	14	10	2	2	4	2
2005–06	Stavanger Oilers	Norway	41	9	18	27	18	17	2	8	10	6
2006–07	Stavanger Oilers	Norway	37	8	18	26	26	12	4	9	13	4
2007–08	Stavanger Oilers	Norway	41	3	20	23	22	4	0	1	1	2
2008–09	IF Björklöven	HockeyAllsvenskan	44	4	11	15	22	—	—	—	—	—
2009–10	IF Björklöven	HockeyAllsvenskan	49	4	15	19	32	—	—	—	—	—
2010–11	IF Björklöven	Division 1	26	6	16	22	14	—	—	—	—	—
2011–12	IF Björklöven	Division 1	28	9	17	26	6	5	0	3	3	2
2012–13	IF Björklöven	Hockeyettan	38	4	14	18	8	11	0	2	2	4
2013–14	IF Björklöven	HockeyAllsvenskan	50	4	8	12	18	—	—	—	—	—
Elitserien totals			238	18	32	50	78	13	1	0	1	4
Norway totals			119	20	56	76	66	33	6	18	24	12
Allsvenskan totals			95	8	23	31	42	20	3	4	7	10
HockeyAllsvenskan totals			143	12	34	46	72	—	—	—	—	—
Hockeyettan (Division 1) totals			92	19	47	66	28	16	0	5	5	6
