= Albin Storm =

Swedish ice hockey player

- Born: January 21, 1997 (age 28); Lidköping, Sweden
- Height: 6 ft 2 in (188 cm)
- Weight: 214 lb (97 kg; 15 st 4 lb)
- Position: Forward
- Shoots: Left
- Allsv team Former teams: Kalmar HC; Växjö Lakers, Hanhals IF, Borås HC
- Playing career: 2014–present

Albin Storm (born January 21, 1997) is a Swedish professional ice hockey player. He is currently playing with Kalmar HC of the HockeyAllsvenskan (Allsv).

On November 27, 2014, Storm made his professional debut playing with Växjö Lakers during the 2014–15 SHL season.
