= Henrik Nilsson (ice hockey, born 1991) =

Swedish-Hungarian ice hockey player

- Born: 5 May 1991 (age 34) Stockholm, Sweden
- Height: 6 ft 2 in (188 cm)
- Weight: 190 lb (86 kg; 13 st 8 lb)
- Position: Defenceman
- Shoots: Right
- Allsv team Former teams: Kalmar HC; AIK IF; Karlskrona HK; Pelicans; IK Oskarshamn; Dornbirn Bulldogs; Fehérvár AV19
- National team: Hungary
- Playing career: 2010–present

Henrik Nilsson (born 5 May 1991) is a Swedish-Hungarian professional ice hockey player, currently playing with Kalmar HC in the HockeyAllsvenskan (Allsv). He played with AIK IF in the Elitserien during the 2010–11 Elitserien season.

After spending the 2018–19 season, with the Lahti Pelicans of the Finnish Liiga, Nilsson returned to the SHL as a free agent in signing a one-year contract with newly promoted IK Oskarshamn on 10 June 2019.
