= 2026–27 SHL season =

- League: Swedish Hockey League
- Sport: Ice hockey
- Duration: 19 September 2026 – 16 March 2027; (Regular season); March 2027 – May 2027; (Playoffs)
- TV partner(s): Telia; TV4 Hockey

Regular season

Playoffs

SHL seasons
- 2025–26 2027–28

The 2026–27 SHL season is the 52nd season of the Swedish Hockey League (SHL). The regular season began on 19 September 2026, and will conclude on 16 March 2027, where it is followed by the playoffs and the relegation playoffs.

== Teams ==
The league consisted of 14 teams; IF Björklöven returned to the SHL after 25 seasons in the HockeyAllsvenskan, where they won the 2025–26 title.

Leksands IF were relegated to the HockeyAllsvenskan at the end of the previous season, after seven seasons in the SHL.

SHL team map

Team	City	Arena	Capacity
Brynäs IF	Gävle	Monitor ERP Arena	7,909
Djurgårdens IF	Stockholm	Hovet	8,094
Färjestad BK	Karlstad	Löfbergs Arena	8,647
Frölunda HC	Gothenburg	Scandinavium	12,044
HV71	Jönköping	Husqvarna Garden	7,000
IF Björklöven	Umeå	Visionite Arena	5,400
Linköping HC	Linköping	Saab Arena	8,500
Luleå HF	Luleå	Coop Norrbotten Arena	6,300
Malmö Redhawks	Malmö	Malmö Arena	13,000
Örebro HK	Örebro	Behrn Arena	5,150
Rögle BK	Ängelholm	Catena Arena	5,150
Skellefteå AIK	Skellefteå	Skellefteå Kraft Arena	6,001
Timrå IK	Timrå	SCA Arena	6,000
Växjö Lakers	Växjö	Vida Arena	5,700

== Regular season ==
Each team plays fifty-two games, playing each of the other thirteen teams four times: twice on home ice, and twice away from home. Points are awarded for each game, where three points were awarded for winning in regulation time, two points for winning in overtime or shootout, one point for losing in overtime or shootout, and zero points for losing in regulation time. At the end of the regular season, the team that finished with the most points will be crowned the league champion.

=== Standings ===
Pos	Team	Pld	W	OTW	OTL	L	GF	GA	GD	Pts	Qualification
1	Färjestad BK	18	14	2	1	1	67	24	+43	47	Qualification to Quarter-finals and Champions Hockey League
2	Frölunda HC	20	12	2	1	5	67	43	+24	41	Qualification to Quarter-finals and Champions Hockey League
3	Skellefteå AIK	18	11	1	2	4	67	47	+20	37	Qualification to Quarter-finals
4	Örebro HK	18	9	1	2	6	45	53	−8	31	Qualification to Quarter-finals
5	Malmö Redhawks	18	7	3	3	5	53	41	+12	30	Qualification to Quarter-finals
6	Luleå HF	18	7	1	3	7	47	47	0	26	Qualification to Quarter-finals
7	Timrå IK	18	6	3	1	8	41	44	−3	25	Qualification to Eighth-finals
8	Brynäs IF	18	7	1	1	9	58	48	+10	24	Qualification to Eighth-finals
9	Rögle BK	19	6	2	2	9	47	55	−8	24	Qualification to Eighth-finals
10	Växjö Lakers	18	7	1	1	9	44	52	−8	24	Qualification to Eighth-finals
11	Djurgårdens IF	19	4	3	2	10	37	56	−19	20	
12	Linköping HC	18	5	1	2	10	42	63	−21	19	
13	IF Björklöven	18	5	2	0	11	34	57	−23	19	Qualification to Play Out
14	HV71	18	3	2	4	9	43	62	−19	17	Qualification to Play Out

Updated to match(es) played on 21 November 2026. Source: SHL.se
Rules for classification: 1) Points; 2) Goal difference; 3) Number of goals scored

=== Statistics ===
==== Scoring leaders ====
The following shows the top ten players who led the league in points, at the conclusion of games played on 21 November 2026. If two or more skaters are tied (i.e. same number of points, goals and played games), all of the tied skaters are shown.

Player	Team	GP	G	A	Pts	+/–	PIM
(Sweden) Oscar Lindberg	Skellefteå AIK	18	8	15	23	+3	20
(Sweden) Viktor Lodin	Färjestad BK	18	12	9	21	+12	24
(Sweden) Lucas Elvenes	Växjö Lakers	17	3	18	21	0	6
(Sweden) Rickard Hugg	Skellefteå AIK	18	7	12	19	+3	2
(Sweden) Pär Lindholm	Skellefteå AIK	17	6	12	18	+9	4
(Finland) Janne Kuokkanen	Malmö Redhawks	18	3	15	18	+4	16
(United States) Kieffer Bellows	Brynäs IF	18	11	6	17	+6	8
(Sweden) Patrik Karlkvist	Örebro HK	18	5	12	17	+1	2
(United States) Dylan McLaughlin	Timrå IK	18	5	12	17	+3	4
(Czech Republic) Radim Zohorna	Färjestad BK	18	6	10	16	+14	8

==== Leading goaltenders ====
The following shows the top ten goaltenders who led the league in goals against average, provided that they had played at least 40% of their team's minutes, at the conclusion of games played on 21 November 2026.

Player	Team	GP	TOI	W	L	GA	SO	Sv%	GAA
(Sweden) Melker Thelin	Färjestad BK	9	546:01	9	0	10	3	95.10	1.10
(Finland) Emil Larmi	Färjestad BK	9	543:30	7	2	13	1	94.09	1.44
(Czech Republic) Marek Langhamer	Malmö Redhawks	12	726:44	8	4	20	3	93.77	1.65
(Sweden) Joel Lassinantti	Luleå HF	15	821:35	7	6	25	2	93.13	1.83
(Sweden) Ludvig Persson	Växjö Lakers	10	551:54	4	4	18	1	92.21	1.96
(United States) Strauss Mann	Skellefteå AIK	15	903:40	11	4	30	0	90.42	1.99
(Sweden) Lars Johansson	Frölunda HC	11	664:12	8	3	23	1	92.36	2.08
(Norway) Tobias Normann	Frölunda HC	9	542:46	6	3	19	2	90.26	2.10
(Sweden) Jacob Johansson	Timrå IK	17	966:39	9	8	35	2	90.86	2.17
(Sweden) Magnus Chrona	Brynäs IF	13	630:25	5	6	25	0	89.50	2.38

== Playoffs ==
Ten teams will qualify for the playoffs: the top six teams in the regular season have a bye to the quarterfinals, while teams ranked seventh to tenth will meet each other (7 versus 10, 8 versus 9) in a preliminary playoff round.

=== Format ===
In the first round, the 7th-ranked team will meet the 10th-ranked team and the 8th-ranked team will meet the 9th-ranked team for a place in the second round. In the second round, the top-ranked team will meet the lowest-ranked winner of the first round, the second-ranked team face the other winner of the first round, the third-ranked team face the sixth-ranked team, and the fourth-ranked team face the fifth-ranked team. In the third round, the highest remaining seed will be matched against the lowest remaining seed. In each round the higher-seeded team was awarded home advantage. The meetings in the first round were played as a best-of-three playoff series, and in the later rounds as a best-of-seven playoff series. In the eighth-finals, the higher-seeded teams played at home for game 2 (plus 3 if necessary) while the lower-seeded teams played at home for game 1. In the later rounds, the higher-seeded teams were at home for games 1 and 3 (plus 5 and 7 if necessary) while the lower-seeded teams were at home for games 2 and 4 (plus 6 if necessary).
