= Andrej Šustr =

Czech ice hockey player (born 1990)

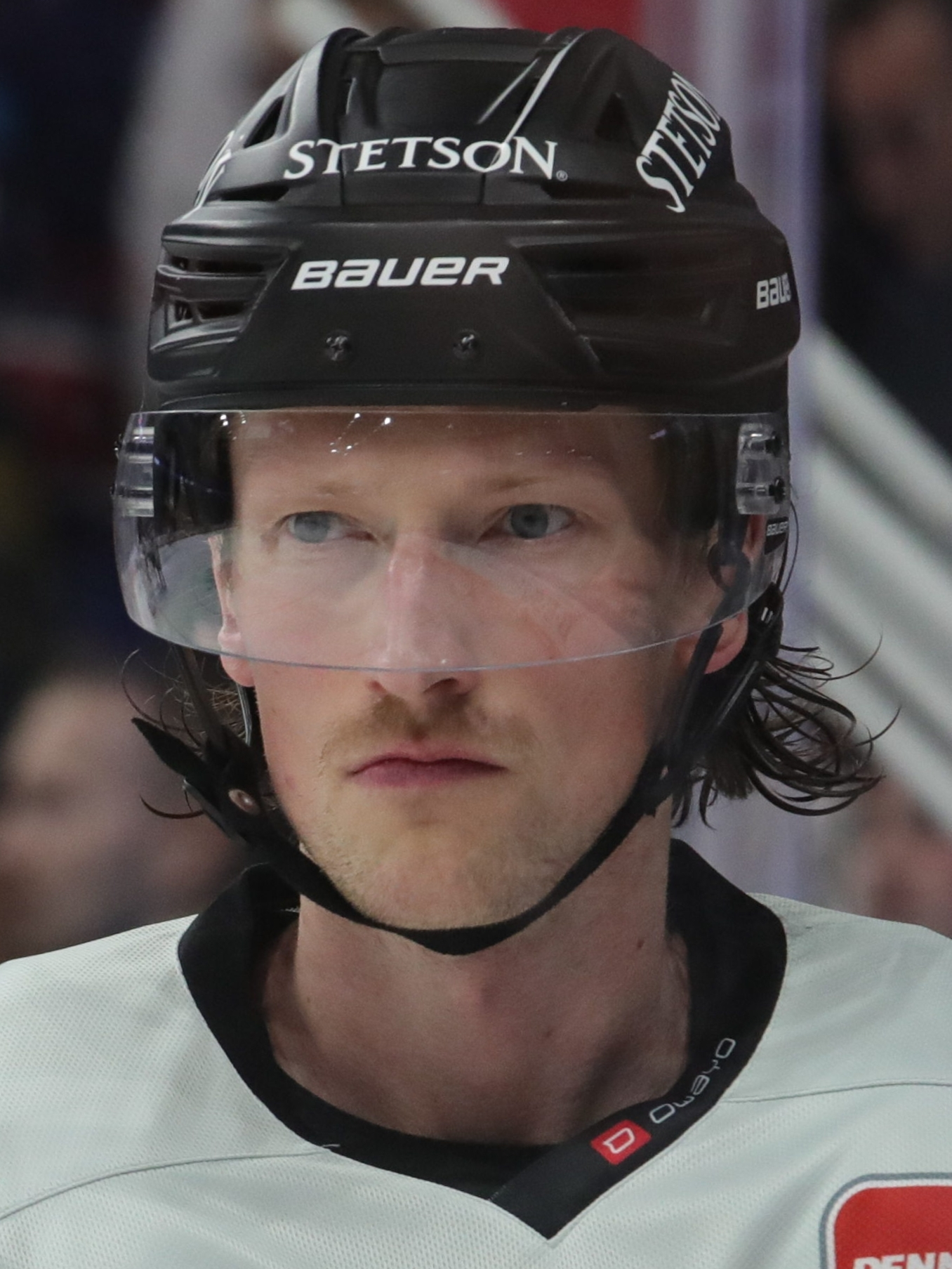
- Šustr with Kölner Haie in November 2023
- Born: 29 November 1990 (age 35) Plzeň, Czechoslovakia
- Height: 6 ft 8 in (203 cm)
- Weight: 220 lb (100 kg; 15 st 10 lb)
- Position: Defence
- Shoots: Right
- Allsvenskan team Former teams: Kalmar HC; Tampa Bay Lightning; Anaheim Ducks; Kunlun Red Star; Iowa Wild; Kölner Haie; HC Dynamo Pardubice; Tappara; Bridgeport Islanders
- National team: Czech Republic
- NHL draft: Undrafted
- Playing career: 2013–present

Andrej Šustr (born 29 November 1990) is a Czech professional ice hockey defenceman who plays for Kalmar HC of HockeyAllsvenskan.

Previously, he played in the NHL for the Tampa Bay Lightning and Anaheim Ducks. An undrafted player, Šustr made his NHL debut with the Lightning in 2013 after playing three seasons of college ice hockey with the University of Nebraska Omaha.

== Playing career ==
=== Junior and college ===
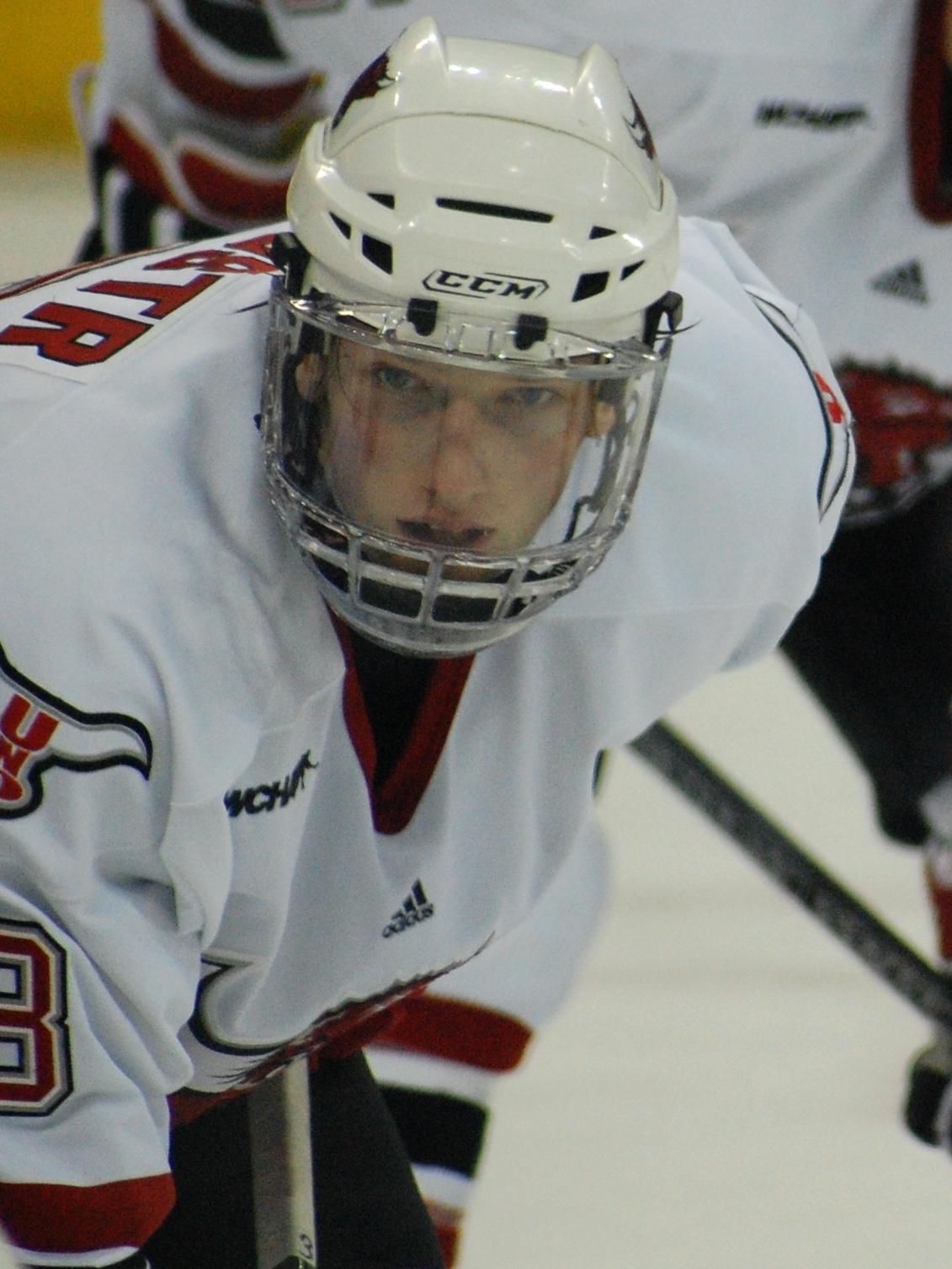
Šustr playing collegiate hockey with the Omaha Mavericks in 2010

Šustr grew up in the city of Plzeň, but after finding little opportunity in his home town, was encouraged to move to the United States at the age of 17 to play junior hockey. He spent a year with the Kenai River Brown Bears of the North American Hockey League (NAHL) in 2008–09 before moving up to the Youngstown Phantoms of the United States Hockey League (USHL) in 2009–10. The University of Omaha Nebraska Mavericks ice hockey program then recruited Šustr to join their program in 2010. He played three seasons with the Mavericks, appearing in 111 games and recording 15 goals and 51 points.

=== Professional ===
An undrafted player, Šustr participated in NHL development camps with the Tampa Bay Lightning, Pittsburgh Penguins and New York Rangers. After completing his junior season at Omaha, he signed a professional contract with the Lightning on 21 March 2013. He made his NHL debut on 29 March against the New Jersey Devils. He appeared in two games in Tampa before being assigned to their American Hockey League (AHL) affiliate, the Syracuse Crunch. He played eight regular season games with Syracuse, scoring two goals and adding an assist, while the Crunch reached the Calder Cup Final against the Grand Rapids Griffins.

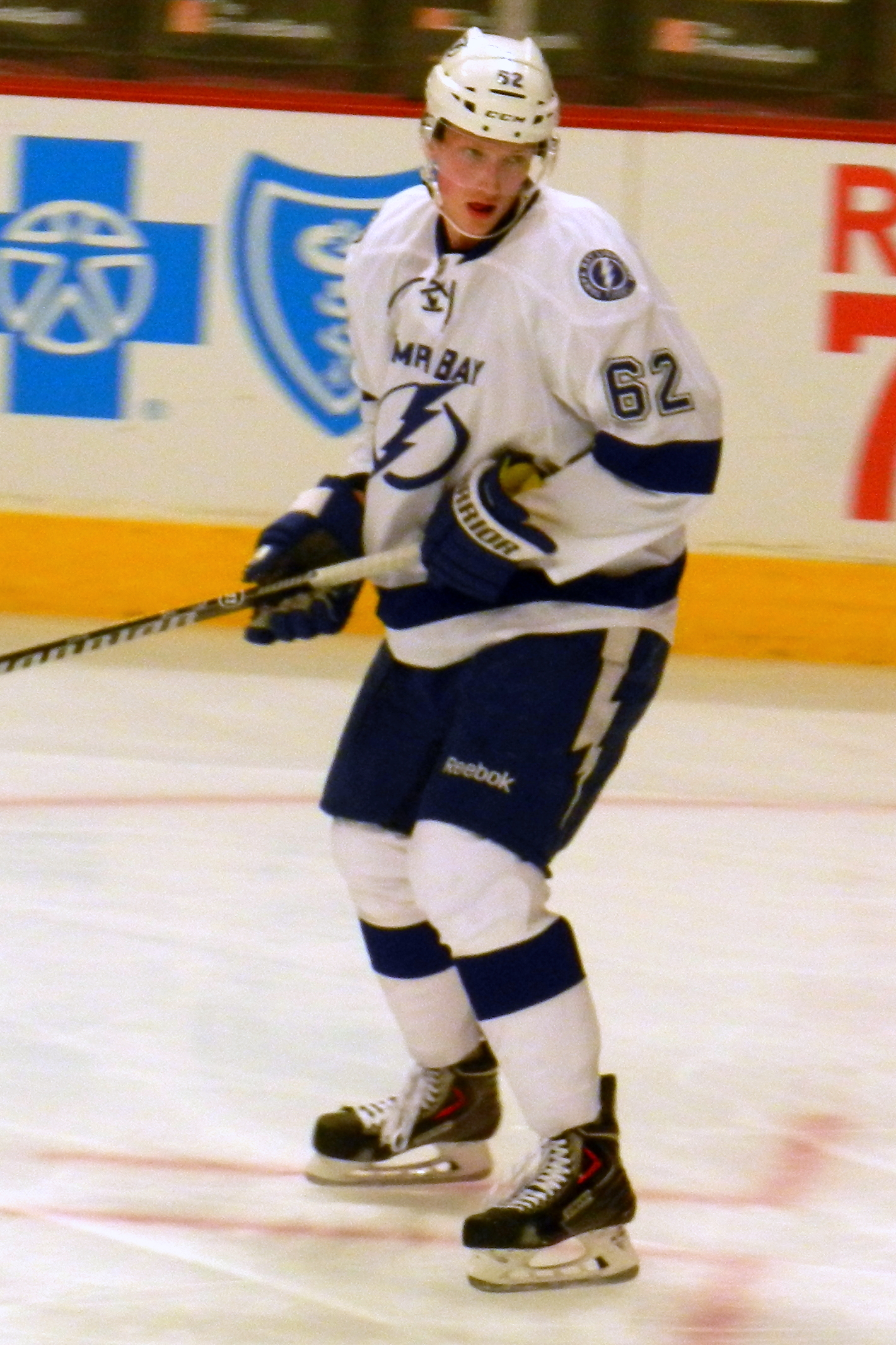
Šustr playing with the Tampa Bay Lightning in 2013

Šustr scored his first career NHL goal on 5 April 2014, against Kari Lehtonen of the Dallas Stars. On 7 July 2014, the Lightning announced that they had re-signed Šustr to a one-year, one-way contract. He made his Stanley Cup playoff debut against the Montreal Canadiens, appearing in three games in the Eastern Conference Quarterfinals. Additionally, Šustr appeared in 12 games with the Crunch, recording a goal and three assists.

On 16 February 2015, during the 2014–15 season he played in his 100th career NHL game in Tampa Bay's 3–2 loss to the Los Angeles Kings. On 30 March, the Lightning announced that Šustr would be out one-to-two weeks with an upper body injury, but was expected to return in time for the start of the 2015 playoffs. On 18 April, he scored his first career playoff goal in a 5–1 Lightning win over the visiting Detroit Red Wings.

On 30 June 2015, the Tampa Bay Lightning re-signed Šustr to a two-year, two-way contract. Šustr played in 72 games with the Lightning in the 2014-15 NHL season, recording 13 assists and 34 penalty minutes. Šustrset career highs in games played, assists, plus/minus (+10) and penalty minutes. Šustr also appeared in 26 Stanley Cup playoffs games for the Lightning, registering one goal and two points. Šustr has skated in 117 NHL games, all with the Lightning over the past three seasons, collecting one goal and 21 points. Šustr ranked fourth on the Lightning for blocked shots with 84 during the 2014–15 season. He also set the Lightning franchise record for the best plus/minus (+7) in a playoff series in the first round of the 2015 Stanley Cup playoffs against the Detroit Red Wings.

On 25 October 2016, Šustr skated in his 200th career NHL game, which came in a 7–3 Lightning victory over the Toronto Maple Leafs at the Air Canada Centre. On 26 June 2017, the Lightning announced that it had re-signed Šustr to a one-year, $1.95 million contract extension.

After six seasons within the Lightning organization, following the 2017–18 season, Šustr left as a free agent and agreed to a one-year, $1.3 million contract with the Anaheim Ducks on 5 July 2018. Šustr began the 2018–19 season with the Ducks. However, he was limited to just 5 games over the duration of the year, reassigned for the majority of the campaign to add a veteran presence to AHL affiliate, the San Diego Gulls.

With his NHL career stagnating, Šustr, an impending free agent from the Ducks, opted to halt his North American career, agreeing to a one-year contract with Chinese club Kunlun Red Star of the Kontinental Hockey League (KHL) on 7 June 2019.

Šustr returned to the Lightning organization on 28 July 2021, when he signed a one-year, two-way contract with the team. He began the 2021–22 season with the Lightning, appearing in his first NHL contest in three years in a 7–6 overtime victory over the Detroit Red Wings on 14 October 2021. He registered 1 goal in 8 games with the Lightning before he was reassigned to AHL affiliate, the Syracuse Crunch, registering 12 points through 25 games. In a recall to the Lightning, on 7 March 2022, Šustr was later placed on waivers by the Lightning, and was claimed the following day by one of his former teams, the Anaheim Ducks.

On 13 July 2022, Šustr joined the Minnesota Wild, signing a one-year, two-way contract as a free agent. In the 2022–23 season, Šustr made 39 appearances with AHL affiliate, the Iowa Wild, collecting 12 points. On 3 March 2023, Šustr was traded by the Wild back to Anaheim, for his third stint with the team, in a package for defenceman John Klingberg.

At the conclusion of the season, as a pending free agent, Šustr was traded by the Ducks to the San Jose Sharks in exchange for Andrew Agozzino on 27 June 2023. While not offered a contract by the Sharks, Šustr left North America as a free agent and agreed to a one-year deal with German outfit Kölner Haie of the DEL, on 10 July 2023.

On 28 July 2024, Šustr signed a one-year contract with HC Dynamo Pardubice of the Czech Extraliga. However, after recording two assists in 12 games, Šustr and the club agreed to mutually part ways. Just four days later, Šustr came to terms with Finnish club Tappara to play the remainder of the season with them.

== International play ==
On 2 March 2016, the Czech Ice Hockey Association named Šustr to its roster for the 2016 World Cup of Hockey. Šustr was joined by Lightning teammate Ondřej Palát. The tournament ran from 17 September to 1 October 2016, in Toronto.

== Career statistics ==
=== Regular season and playoffs ===
			Regular season					Playoffs
Season	Team	League	GP	G	A	Pts	PIM	GP	G	A	Pts	PIM
2005–06	HC Lasselsberger Plzeň	Czech.18	8	0	0	0	2	—	—	—	—	—
2005–06	HC Dukla Jihlava	Czech.18	17	1	4	5	22	—	—	—	—	—
2006–07	HC Dukla Jihlava	Czech.18	37	5	15	20	56	—	—	—	—	—
2006–07	HC Dukla Jihlava	Czech.20	5	0	0	0	4	—	—	—	—	—
2007–08	HC Lasselsberger Plzeň	Czech.20	41	2	8	10	44	5	1	0	1	4
2008–09	HC Lasselsberger Plzeň	Czech.20	13	1	4	5	14	—	—	—	—	—
2008–09	HK Rokycany	Czech.2	2	0	0	0	2	—	—	—	—	—
2008–09	Kenai River Brown Bears	NAHL	36	1	7	8	58	2	0	0	0	2
2009–10	Youngstown Phantoms	USHL	50	1	18	19	95	—	—	—	—	—
2010–11	University of Nebraska Omaha	WCHA	39	2	7	9	38	—	—	—	—	—
2011–12	University of Nebraska Omaha	WCHA	33	4	13	17	26	—	—	—	—	—
2012–13	University of Nebraska Omaha	WCHA	39	9	16	25	53	—	—	—	—	—
2012–13	Tampa Bay Lightning	NHL	2	0	0	0	0	—	—	—	—	—
2012–13	Syracuse Crunch	AHL	8	2	1	3	8	18	2	5	7	25
2013–14	Syracuse Crunch	AHL	12	1	3	4	2	—	—	—	—	—
2013–14	Tampa Bay Lightning	NHL	43	1	7	8	16	3	0	0	0	2
2014–15	Tampa Bay Lightning	NHL	72	0	13	13	34	26	1	1	2	18
2015–16	Tampa Bay Lightning	NHL	77	4	17	21	30	17	1	2	3	16
2016–17	Tampa Bay Lightning	NHL	80	3	11	14	43	—	—	—	—	—
2017–18	Tampa Bay Lightning	NHL	44	2	5	7	18	—	—	—	—	—
2018–19	Anaheim Ducks	NHL	5	0	0	0	6	—	—	—	—	—
2018–19	San Diego Gulls	AHL	39	0	3	3	20	—	—	—	—	—
2019–20	Kunlun Red Star	KHL	58	0	8	8	55	—	—	—	—	—
2020–21	Kunlun Red Star	KHL	41	0	5	5	18	—	—	—	—	—
2021–22	Tampa Bay Lightning	NHL	15	1	0	1	6	—	—	—	—	—
2021–22	Syracuse Crunch	AHL	25	2	10	12	32	—	—	—	—	—
2021–22	Anaheim Ducks	NHL	23	0	5	5	10	—	—	—	—	—
2022–23	Iowa Wild	AHL	39	2	10	12	35	—	—	—	—	—
2022–23	San Diego Gulls	AHL	12	1	1	2	6	—	—	—	—	—
2023–24	Kölner Haie	DEL	44	2	18	20	30	—	—	—	—	—
2024–25	HC Dynamo Pardubice	ELH	16	1	3	4	37	—	—	—	—	—
2024–25	Tappara	Liiga	38	1	11	12	32	9	0	0	0	2
2025–26	Bridgeport Islanders	AHL	11	0	1	1	21	—	—	—	—	—
NHL totals			361	11	58	69	163	46	2	3	5	36

=== International ===
Year	Team	Event	Result	GP	G	A	Pts	PIM
2010	Czech Republic	WJC	7th	5	0	0	0	6
2016	Czech Republic	WCH	6th	3	1	0	1	2
2021	Czech Republic	WC	7th	6	0	1	1	2
Junior totals				5	0	0	0	6
Senior totals				9	1	1	2	4

== Awards and honors ==
Award	Year
All-WCHA Third Team	2012–13
