= Wilhelm Westlund =

Swedish ice hockey player

- Born: March 15, 1995 (age 31) Stockholm, Sweden
- Height: 6 ft 0 in (183 cm)
- Weight: 185 lb (84 kg; 13 st 3 lb)
- Position: Defence
- Shoots: Left
- Allsv team Former teams: Kalmar HC; HC Poruba; Färjestad BK; Djurgårdens IF
- NHL draft: 183rd overall, 2013; Colorado Avalanche
- Playing career: 2012–present

Wilhelm Westlund (born March 15, 1995) is a Swedish professional ice hockey defenceman. He is currently playing with Kalmar HC of the HockeyAllsvenskan (Allsv). He was selected by the Colorado Avalanche in the 7th round (183rd overall) of the 2013 NHL entry draft.

== Playing career ==
After joining Färjestad BK as a 15-year-old, Westlund made his professional debut three-years later in the Elitserien playing with Färjestad during the 2012–13 Elitserien season. In the completion of the 2013–14 season, having played 11 games with the senior team, Westlund opted to return to Stockholm in signing a three-year contract with Djurgårdens IF on July 11, 2014.

On August 11, 2014, Westlund was given a season loan by Djurgården to further develop in the Allsvenskan with HC Vita Hästen. Before the 2014–15 season, Westlund attended his first NHL training camp with the Avalanche before returning to Hästen on September 21, 2014.

With his NHL rights no longer held by the Avalanche, Westlund continued with Djurgårdens IF through to the 2016–17 season. He appeared in three scoreless games with DIF, unable to cement a roster spot, he was initially loaned familiarly to the Allsvenskan with Almtuna IS on October 13, 2016. After a successful two-week period, Westlund was released from his contract with Djurgårdens and opted to sign and continue for the remainder of the season with Almtuna on November 1, 2016. Westlund appeared in 33 games and contributed with 7 points before he was released to fellow Allsvenskan club, Timrå IK, to fill a shortage of players due to injury on February 15, 2017.

Westlund played the following two seasons in the Allsvenskan with previous club, HC Vita Hästen, before leaving as a free agent after the 2018–19 season. On April 17, 2019, he agreed to remain in the second-tier Allsvenskan, signing a one-year contract with BIK Karlskoga.

After five further seasons with BIK, Westlund opted to leave Sweden as a free agent and secured a contract with second-tier Czech club, HC Poruba of the Czech.1 Liga, on 8 July 2024.

== Career statistics ==
=== Regular season and playoffs ===
			Regular season					Playoffs
Season	Team	League	GP	G	A	Pts	PIM	GP	G	A	Pts	PIM
2011–12	Färjestad BK	J20	33	3	4	7	12	6	0	0	0	0
2012–13	Färjestad BK	J20	33	3	12	15	76	5	0	3	3	2
2012–13	Färjestad BK	SEL	26	1	0	1	0	6	0	0	0	0
2013–14	Färjestad BK	J20	34	2	15	17	16	6	2	5	7	2
2013–14	Färjestad BK	SHL	11	0	0	0	0	—	—	—	—	—
2014–15	HC Vita Hästen	Allsv	40	2	9	11	18	—	—	—	—	—
2014–15	Djurgårdens IF	J20	—	—	—	—	—	4	2	2	4	4
2015–16	Djurgårdens IF	SHL	11	0	0	0	4	3	0	0	0	0
2015–16	HC Vita Hästen	Allsv	42	3	11	14	14	—	—	—	—	—
2016–17	Djurgårdens IF	J20	2	0	2	2	0	—	—	—	—	—
2016–17	Djurgårdens IF	SHL	4	0	0	0	2	—	—	—	—	—
2016–17	Almtuna IS	Allsv	33	1	6	7	8	—	—	—	—	—
2016–17	Timrå IK	Allsv	7	0	2	2	0	5	1	2	3	2
2017–18	HC Vita Hästen	Allsv	50	7	11	18	52	—	—	—	—	—
2018–19	HC Vita Hästen	Allsv	38	2	7	9	16	—	—	—	—	—
2019–20	BIK Karlskoga	Allsv	52	9	29	38	20	1	1	0	1	0
2020–21	BIK Karlskoga	Allsv	51	2	11	13	22	—	—	—	—	—
2021–22	BIK Karlskoga	Allsv	48	5	15	20	41	6	0	0	0	25
2022–23	BIK Karlskoga	Allsv	43	1	13	14	12	4	0	1	1	2
2023–24	BIK Karlskoga	Allsv	32	1	6	7	4	12	0	2	2	8
2024–25	HC Poruba	Czech.1	43	5	17	22	18	5	0	0	0	2
SHL totals			52	1	0	1	6	9	0	0	0	0

=== International ===
Year	Team	Event	Result	GP	G	A	Pts	PIM
2012	Sweden	U17	4th	6	1	1	2	6
2013	Sweden	WJC18	5th	4	0	1	1	0
Junior totals				10	1	2	3	6
