= Frans Tuohimaa =

Finnish ice hockey player

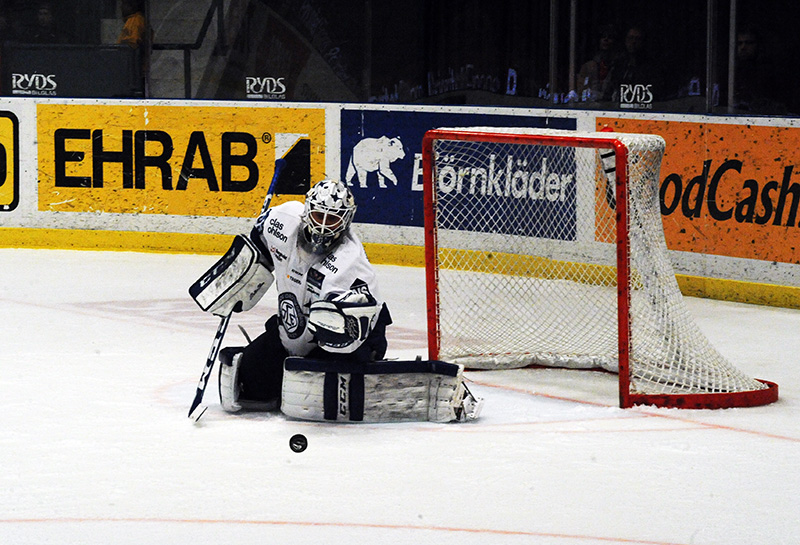
- Tuohimaa in 2015
- Born: 19 August 1991 (age 34) Helsinki, Finland
- Height: 6 ft 2 in (188 cm)
- Weight: 191 lb (87 kg; 13 st 9 lb)
- Position: Goaltender
- Catches: Left
- Allsv team Former teams: IF Björklöven; Jokerit; HPK; SaiPa; HIFK; Neftekhimik Nizhnekamsk; Jukurit; Skellefteå AIK; Frölunda HC; Brynäs IF
- National team: Finland
- NHL draft: 182nd overall, 2011; Edmonton Oilers
- Playing career: 2011–present

Frans Tuohimaa (born 19 August 1991) is a Finnish professional ice hockey goaltender who plays for IF Björklöven of the HockeyAllsvenskan (Allsv).

== Playing career ==
Tuohimaa was playing with Jokerit in the then Finnish SM-liiga before he was selected by the Edmonton Oilers in the 7th round (182nd overall) of the 2011 NHL entry draft.

Tuohimaa moved to league rivals HPK before moving to North America in March 2014, signing a two-year entry-level contract with the Edmonton Oilers organization.

He played the 2014–15 season within the Oilers affiliates, the Bakersfield Condors of the American Hockey League and the Bakersfield Condors of the ECHL. Unable to impact the Oilers' depth chart, Tuohimaa opted to return to Europe at the season's end by signing with Swedish HockeyAllsvenskan club, Leksands IF on 18 May 2015.

Following five further seasons in the Liiga, Tuohimaa, as a free agent following the 2020–21 campaign and was signed to a one-year Kontinental Hockey League (KHL) contract with Russian club, HC Neftekhimik Nizhnekamsk, on 16 May 2021. Tuohimaa made 26 regular season appearances with Neftekhimik, registering nine wins and a 2.53 goals against average. In March 2022, Tuohimaa left Neftekhimik Nizhnekamsk during playoffs due to the Russian invasion of Ukraine.

On 17 May 2022, Tuohimaa opted to return to the Finnish Liiga, securing a one-year contract with Mikkelin Jukurit. In the 2022–23 season, Tuohimaa, playing behind a porous defence, collected 11 wins through 34 regular season games. With Jukurit out of post-season contention, Tuohimaa left the Liiga and signed for the remainder of the season with Swedish club, Skellefteå AIK of the SHL, on 15 February 2023.

Medal record

Representing Finland

Ice hockey

Olympic Games
Gold medal – first place	2022 Beijing	

World Championships
Gold medal – first place	2022 Finland	

== Career statistics ==
=== Regular season and playoffs ===
			Regular season									Playoffs
Season	Team	League	GP	W	L	T/OT	MIN	GA	SO	GAA	SV%	GP	W	L	MIN	GA	SO	GAA	SV%
2007–08	HIFK	Jr. A	1	0	0	0	17	3	0	10.71	.750	—	—	—	—	—	—	—	—
2008–09	HIFK	Jr. A	18	4	13	0	983	65	0	3.97	.885	—	—	—	—	—	—	—	—
2009–10	HIFK	Jr. A	20	14	5	0	1144	55	2	2.89	.911	12	7	5	696	31	1	2.67	.909
2010–11	Jokerit	Jr. A	37	24	13	0	2183	78	6	2.14	.931	7	3	4	425	21	0	2.97	.930
2011–12	Jokerit	Jr. A	1	1	0	0	65	1	0	0.93	.965	8	4	4	449	14	1	1.68	.936
2011–12	Jokerit	SM-l	18	6	6	5	1042	46	2	2.65	.898	—	—	—	—	—	—	—	—
2011–12	Kiekko-Vantaa	Mestis	16	6	10	0	956	45	1	2.82	.921	4	0	4	237	18	0	4.56	.881
2012–13	Jokerit	SM-l	13	5	2	6	787	30	0	2.29	.912	2	0	1	78	1	0	0.77	.960
2012–13	Kiekko-Vantaa	Mestis	16	—	—	—	971	40	1	2.47	.915	—	—	—	—	—	—	—	—
2013–14	HPK	Liiga	19	5	10	3	981	51	1	3.12	.894	—	—	—	—	—	—	—	—
2013–14	Sport	Mestis	5	—	—	—	311	13	0	2.52	.925	7	3	4	418	14	1	2.01	.926
2013–14	Oklahoma City Barons	AHL	1	1	0	0	65	2	0	1.85	.915	—	—	—	—	—	—	—	—
2014–15	Oklahoma City Barons	AHL	3	2	0	1	185	13	0	4.22	.904	—	—	—	—	—	—	—	—
2014–15	Bakersfield Condors	ECHL	33	11	15	4	1795	98	0	3.28	.876	—	—	—	—	—	—	—	—
2015–16	Leksands IF	Allsv	35	13	20	0	1967	90	1	2.75	.913	4	0	1	114	7	0	3.68	.854
2016–17	SaiPa	Liiga	28	4	15	6	1546	72	3	2.79	.916	—	—	—	—	—	—	—	—
2016–17	Hokki	Mestis	3	—	—	—	—	—	—	2.00	.917	—	—	—	—	—	—	—	—
2017–18	SaiPa	Liiga	51	19	14	16	2950	111	4	2.26	.920	9	4	4	570	26	1	2.74	.909
2018–19	SaiPa	Liiga	48	16	18	14	2898	118	4	2.46	.900	3	1	2	197	9	0	3.00	.894
2019–20	HIFK	Liiga	33	16	9	7	1896	68	3	2.15	.905	—	—	—	—	—	—	—	—
2020–21	HIFK	Liiga	33	15	8	9	1920	68	6	2.12	.898	8	5	3	516	19	0	2.21	.906
2021–22	Neftekhimik Nizhnekamsk	KHL	26	9	12	1	1373	58	1	2.53	.906	—	—	—	—	—	—	—	—
2022–23	Jukurit	Liiga	34	11	20	2	1976	92	1	2.79	.894	—	—	—	—	—	—	—	—
2022–23	Skellefteå AIK	SHL	4	1	2	0	220	6	0	1.64	.927	1	0	1	59	3	0	3.03	.800
2023–24	Frölunda HC	SHL	10	6	3	0	588	22	1	2.25	.911	2	0	1	97	4	0	2.49	.904
2024–25	Södertälje SK	Allsv	41	25	16	0	2443	96	2	2.36	.910	9	5	4	482	22	2	2.74	.921
2024–25	Brynäs IF	SHL	—	—	—	—	—	—	—	—	—	1	0	0	29	1	0	2.07	.857
Liiga totals			277	81	84	54	13,185	529	21	2.41	.908	20	10	9	1283	54	1	2.52	.906
KHL totals			26	9	12	1	1373	58	1	2.53	.906	—	—	—	—	—	—	—	—
