= 2024–25 HockeyAllsvenskan season =

- League: HockeyAllsvenskan
- Sport: Ice hockey
- Duration: 20 September 2024 – 7 March 2025 (regular season)
- Number of teams: 14
- TV partner(s): TV4
- First place: Djurgårdens IF
- Top scorer: Fredrik Forsberg (IF Björklöven)
- Promoted to SHL: Djurgårdens IF
- Relegated to Hockeyettan: Tingsryds AIF

HockeyAllsvenskan seasons
- ← 2023–24 2025–26 →

The 2024–25 HockeyAllsvenskan season was the 20th season of HockeyAllsvenskan, the second-highest professional ice hockey league in Sweden. The season consisted of 14 teams playing a regular season in which each team played each other team four times; twice at home and twice away. The regular season is followed by a series of promotion and relegation tournaments, with the teams finishing first through tenth participating in promotion playoffs, and those finishing thirteenth and fourteenth forced to requalify to avoid relegation to Hockeyettan.

For the 2024–25 season, there were three team movements. Brynäs IF was promoted to the SHL as reigning 2024 HockeyAllsvenskan champions. Västerviks IK lost for the second consecutive season in the play-out and were demoted to the Hockeyettan with Vimmerby HC promoted in their place.

== Participating teams ==
HockeyAllsvenskan team map

Team	City	Arena	Capacity
AIK	Stockholm	Hovet	8,094
Almtuna IS	Uppsala	Upplands Bilforum Arena	2,800
IF Björklöven	Umeå	Winpos Arena	5,400
Djurgårdens IF	Stockholm	Hovet	8,094
Kalmar HC	Kalmar	Hatstore Arena	2,500
BIK Karlskoga	Karlskoga	Nobelhallen	6,300
Mora IK	Mora	Smidjegrav Arena	4,500
Nybro Vikings	Nybro	Liljas Arena	2,380
IK Oskarshamn	Oskarshamn	Be-Ge Hockey Center	3,275
Södertälje SK	Södertälje	Scaniarinken	6,200
Tingsryds AIF	Tingsryd	Nelson Garden Arena	3,400
Västerås IK	Västerås	ABB Arena Nord	4,902
Vimmerby HC	Vimmerby	VBO Arena	1,750
Östersunds IK	Östersund	Östersund Arena	2,700

== Regular season ==
=== Standings ===
Pos	Team	Pld	W	OTW	OTL	L	GF	GA	GD	Pts	Qualification or relegation
1	Djurgårdens IF	52	32	7	6	7	188	124	+64	116	Advance to the Quarterfinals
2	BIK Karlskoga	52	32	6	4	10	173	104	+69	112	Advance to the Quarterfinals
3	Södertälje SK	52	28	6	5	13	173	123	+50	101	Advance to the Quarterfinals
4	IF Björklöven	52	28	4	6	14	204	152	+52	98	Advance to the Quarterfinals
5	AIK	52	27	7	1	17	162	125	+37	96	Advance to the Quarterfinals
6	Kalmar HC	52	26	6	6	14	179	146	+33	96	Advance to the Quarterfinals
7	Mora IK	52	21	4	11	16	152	146	+6	82	Advance to the Eighth-finals
8	IK Oskarshamn	52	19	9	7	17	157	153	+4	82	Advance to the Eighth-finals
9	Nybro Vikings	52	16	5	7	24	133	155	−22	65	Advance to the Eighth-finals
10	Västerås IK	52	15	4	5	28	121	164	−43	58	Advance to the Eighth-finals
11	Almtuna IS	52	12	9	3	28	116	154	−38	57	
12	Östersunds IK	52	9	5	7	31	102	168	−66	44	
13	Vimmerby HC	52	8	7	6	31	115	187	−72	44	Advance to Play Out
14	Tingsryds AIF	52	8	4	9	31	95	169	−74	41	Advance to Play Out

Updated to match(es) played on 7 March 2025. Source: swehockey.se

== Post-season ==
=== Playoff bracket ===
Eighth-finals; Swedish: Åttondelsfinal
7	Mora IK	2
10	Västerås IK	1
8	IK Oskarshamn	2
9	Nybro Vikings	0

Quarterfinals; Swedish: Kvartsfinal
1	Djurgårdens IF	4
8	Mora IK	0
2	BIK Karlskoga	4
7	IK Oskarshamn	2
3	Södertälje SK	4
6	Kalmar HC	1
4	IF Björklöven	3
5	AIK	4

Semifinals
1	Djurgårdens IF	4
3	Södertälje SK	3
(Pairings are re-seeded after the first and second round)
2	BIK Karlskoga	2
5	AIK	4

Finals
1	Djurgårdens IF	4
5	AIK	1
