= Didrik Strömberg =

Swedish ice hockey player

- Born: March 16, 1994 (age 31) Sundsvall, Sweden
- Height: 6 ft 2 in (188 cm)
- Weight: 201 lb (91 kg; 14 st 5 lb)
- Position: Defence
- Shoots: Left
- SHL team Former teams: Timrå IK; HV71
- Playing career: 2011–present

Didrik Strömberg (born 16 March 1994) is a professional Swedish Ice Hockey player. He was born in Sundsvall, Sweden. Didrik currently plays for Timrå IK in the Swedish Hockey League (SHL). His youth team was IF Sundsvall Hockey.
