= Axel Ottosson =

Swedish ice hockey player

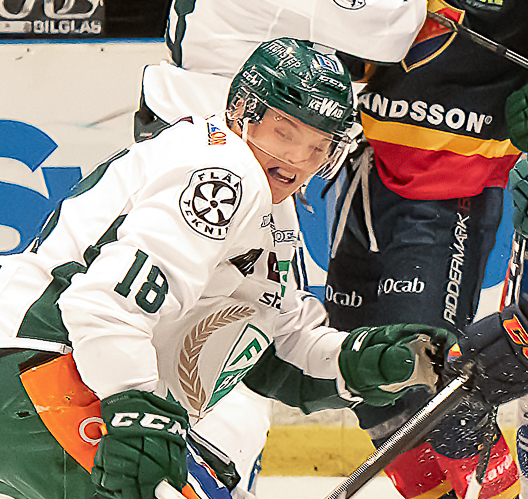
- Axel Ottosson
- Born: April 19, 1996 (age 29); Umeå, Sweden
- Height: 5 ft 10 in (178 cm)
- Weight: 181 lb (82 kg; 12 st 13 lb)
- Position: Forward
- Shoots: Left
- Allsv team Former teams: IF Björklöven; MoDo Hockey; Färjestad BK; Linköping HC; KooKoo
- Playing career: 2014–present

Axel Ottosson (born April 19, 1996) is a Swedish professional ice hockey forward. He is currently playing with IF Björklöven of the HockeyAllsvenskan (Allsv).

On November 27, 2014, Ottosson made his Swedish Hockey League debut playing with Modo Hockey during the 2014–15 SHL season.
