= Kalmar HC =

- City: Kalmar
- League: HockeyAllsvenskan
- Founded: 1968
- Home arena: Hatstore Arena
- Colours: Red, yellow
- General manager: Daniel Stolt
- Head coach: Viktor Tuurala
- Captain: Henrik Nilsson

Kalmar HC (or Kalmar Hockey Club) is a Swedish professional ice hockey club from Kalmar, the capital of Kalmar County. For most of its history, the team was consigned to the lower levels of professional hockey in Sweden, however, since 2016, the team has been promoted several times and, as of 2023, has climbed up to HockeyAllsvenskan, the national second league.

== History ==
Founded in 1968, Kalmar HC began as a semi-professional club in the Hockeytrean, or Division 3 level. Kalmar was not a successful club for many years, routinely posting losing records and finishing near the bottom of the regional standings. It wasn't until its tenth season that the club was able to post a winning season but, even then it took a further thirteen years before they were able to secure their first promotion. After their peak in 1991, the club remained at the Hockeytvåan (Division 2) level for a decade. Their best campaign came in 2000 when they went 11–3, however, they failed to earn a promotion. Unfortunately, the following year they posted a terrible mark of 3–10–1 and were relegated back to Division 3.

=== Name changes ===
Beginning in 2001 the club became known as the 'Kalmar Knights' and posted two outstanding seasons in Hockeytrean They returned to Division 2 in 2003 but were unable to establish any success and were relegated back to Division 3 in 2007. Kalmar dropped the Knights nickname in 2008, instead becoming 'IF Kalmar Hockey'. Four years later, they returned to their original name of 'Kalmar HC'.

=== Promotions ===
Kalmar remained at the Division 3 level until 2016 when the club went nearly undefeated in league play and returned to Division 2. Just two years later, the club was promoted for a second time and reached Hockeyettan (Division 1) for the first time. Over the next several years, Kalmar was one of the better teams in Division 1 and flirted with promotion more than once. In 2023, they were one of six teams competing in the Kvalserien (promotion tournament) and finished in 2nd place, earning one of the two available spots in HockeyAllsvenskan in 2023.

== Seasons-by-season records ==
'This is a partial list, featuring the five most recent completed seasons.

Year	Level	League	Record					Place	Notes	Ref.
Year	Level	League	W	OTW	OTL	L	PTS	Place	Notes	Ref.
2019–20	HockeyEttan	Södra	11	1	3	7	38	6th	Advanced to Fortsättningsserien	
2019–20	HockeyEttan	Södra Forts.	12	0	0	6	42	2nd	Remainder of series cancelled (COVID-19)	
2020–21	HockeyEttan	Södra	4	5	5	8	27	9th	Advanced to Fortsättningsserien	
2020–21	HockeyEttan	Södra Forts.	10	1	2	5	37	2nd	Saved from relegation	
2021–22	HockeyEttan	Södra	11	1	1	5	36	1st	Advanced to Allettan division	
2021–22	HockeyEttan	Allettan Södra	17	1	1	7	55	2nd	Lost in playoffs	
2022–23	HockeyEttan	Södra	11	2	2	3	40	1st	Advanced to Allettan division	
2022–23	HockeyEttan	Allettan Södra	12	1	1	4	39	1st	Advanced to Kvalserien	
2022–23	HockeyEttan	Kvalserien	5	2	0	3	19	2nd	Promoted to HockeyAllsvenskan	
2023–24	HockeyAllsvenskan	—	19	6	5	22	74	10th	Lost 1–2 to BIK Karlskoga in Eighth-finals	
2024–25	HockeyAllsvenskan	—	26	6	6	14	96	6th	Lost 1–4 to Södertälje SK in Quarterfinals	

== Players and personnel ==
=== Current roster ===
As of December 28, 2025.

No.	Nat	Player	Pos	S/G	Age	Acquired	Birthplace
4	(Canada)	Peter DiLiberatore	D	L	26	2025	Halifax, Nova Scotia
5	(Sweden)	Tobias Aronsson	D	L	27	2025	Umeå, Sweden
9	(Sweden)	Wilhelm Westlund	D	L	31	2025	Stockholm, Sweden
11	(Sweden)	Mattias Wigley	C/LW	L	32	2024	Huddinge, Sweden
14	(Canada)	George Diaco	C	L	24	2025	London, Ontario
15	(Sweden)	Carl-Johan Lerby (A)	D	L	29	2024	Trelleborg, Sweden
17	(Sweden)	Tobias Abrahamsson	D	L	23	2025	Jönköping, Sweden
18	(Sweden)	Jesper Lindén		R	28	2025	Stockholm, Sweden
19	(Czech Republic)	Andrej Šustr	D	R	35	2026	Plzen, Czechia
20	(Canada)	Scott Walford	D	L	27	2025	Coquitlam, British Columbia
21	(Canada)	Matthew Struthers	F	L	26	2024	London, Ontario
22	(Sweden)	Gustaf Westlund		L	28	2025	Paris, France
27	(Hungary)	Henrik Nilsson (C)	D	R	35	2024	Stockholm, Sweden
31	(Sweden)	Carl Malmqvist	G	L	24	2025	Stockholm, Sweden
33	(Czech Republic)	Jakub Hašek	D	L	20	2025	Czechia
43	(Sweden)	William Eckmyhl	D	L	26	2024	Sundsvall, Sweden
48	(Estonia)	Nikita Antonov	D	L	19	2025	Tallinn, Estonia
50	(Sweden)	Elliot Ekmark	C	L	24	2025	Linköping, Sweden
63	(Canada)	Matt Fonteyne (A)	C	L	28	2024	Wetaskiwin, Alberta
65	(Sweden)	Jacob Crespin	G	L	27	2024	Ängelholm, Sweden
68	(Sweden)	Eddie Levin		L	26	2025	Sweden
71	(Sweden)	Gabriel Olsson (A)	RW	R	28	2020	Växjö, Sweden
73	(Sweden)	Valdemar Johansson	C/LW	L	23	2024	Bälinge, Sweden
77	(Sweden)	Ludvig Jardeskog	D	L	31	2024	Kristianstad, Sweden
86	(Canada)	Giorgio Estephan	C	R	29	2025	Edmonton, Alberta
90	(Canada)	Liam Hawel	C/RW	R	27	2025	Kanata, Ottawa
91	(Sweden)	Arvid Westlin		L	20	2025	Katrineholm, Sweden
94	(Sweden)	Albin Storm	C/LW	L	29	2025	Lidköping, Sweden
