= Nybro Vikings =

- City: Nybro, Sweden
- League: (Sweden) HockeyAllsvenskan as of the 2023-24 season
- Founded: 1946
- Home arena: Liljas Arena
- Colors: Red, black, white
- General manager: Anders Westring
- Head coach: Hampus Sylvegård
- Website: nybrovikings.com

Franchise history
- 1946–1955: IK Ymer
- 1955–1998: Nybro IF
- 1998–2002: Nybro IF Hockey
- 2002–present: Nybro Vikings IF

The Nybro Vikings are a Swedish professional ice-hockey club based in Nybro, Sweden. The team played in the highest league in Sweden for two seasons 1968–69 and 1969–70 and the second highest league during the 70s and 80s and again for seven years from 2002 to 2009 in HockeyAllsvenskan. The team was relegated to the third division, Division 1, during the 2008–2009 season after finishing 15th in the regular season and third in the following qualification series. On 22 April 2023, the Nybro Vikings qualified for HockeyAllsvenskan again after defeating Piteå HC, 6–1, in a home game during the final round of the HockeyAllsvenskan qualification series.

== Arena ==
The team plays in Liljas Arena, which has a capacity of 2,380 spectators. The arena was originally built in 1963 under the name Victoriahallen, making it the fourth oldest indoor ice hockey arena in Sweden. It was renovated in both 1984 and 2014. The attendance record is 4,027 spectators, set in a game against Tingsryds AIF in 1970.

== History ==
Nybro IF was founded in 1906 as a general sports club. In 1939, the bandy club IK Ymer was established in Nybro and later transitioned to ice hockey. Ymer played its first official ice hockey season in 1946, which is considered the founding year of the current club by Nybro Vikings.

In 1955, IK Ymer became the ice hockey section of Nybro IF, following the appointment of Ymer's chairman Evald Carlsson as chairman of Nybro IF. The ice hockey section operated under the name Nybro IF until 1998, when it became independent as Nybro IF Hockey. In 2002, the club adopted its current name, Nybro Vikings IF. Evald Carlsson, who chaired both IK Ymer and later Nybro IF, played a central role in the club's development and was instrumental in the construction of Victoriahallen in 1963.

Among many seasons in Sweden's second division, the club also played two seasons in the top-tier league during 1968–69 and 1969–70.

== Notable players ==
Fredrik Olausson, a member of the 2002 Stanley Cup champion Detroit Red Wings, started his career with Nybro.

Björn "Böna" Johansson, who played for Nybro IF from 1968 to 1971, played 112 games for the Swedish national team between 1972 and 1976. During his national career he played in 5 IIHF World Championships and 1 Canada Cup. He then played 6 seasons for Södertälje SK in Elitserien, and in 1977 returned to Nybro, where he ended his career in 1983.

== Supporters ==
The official supporter club of Nybro Vikings is known as Viking Support.

Match against Halmstad Hammers
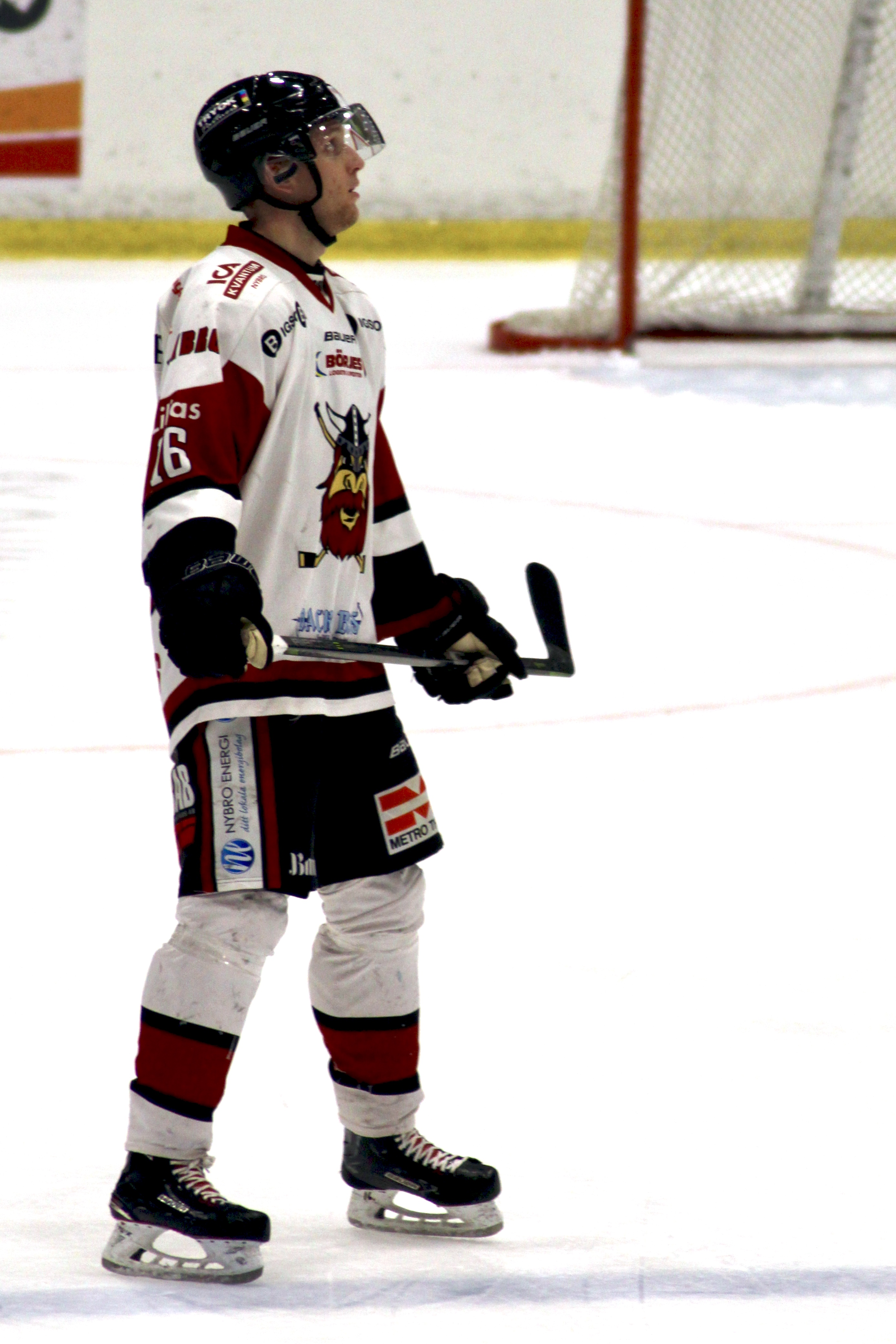
Alex Ek, centre

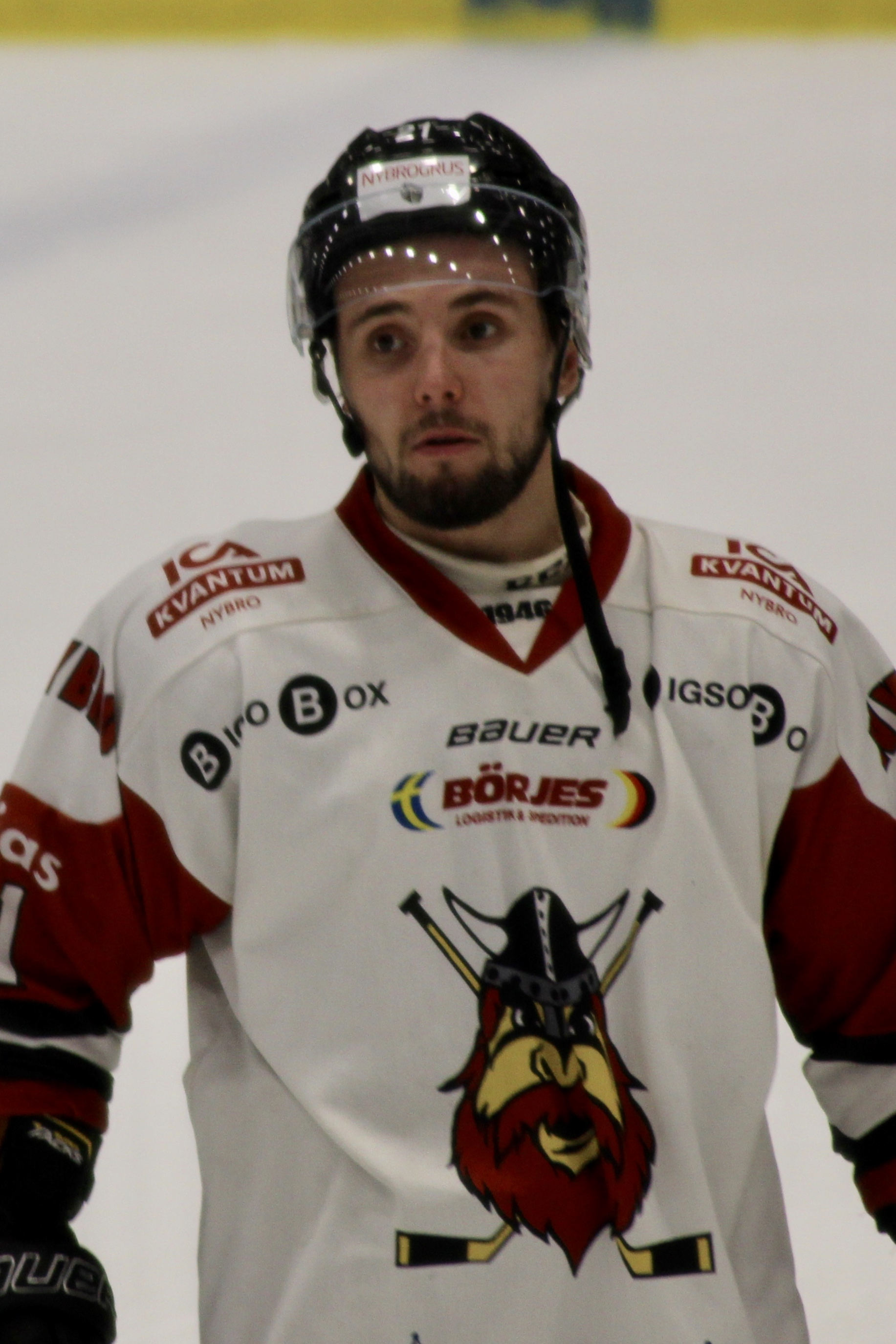
Janne Kivilahti, right winger

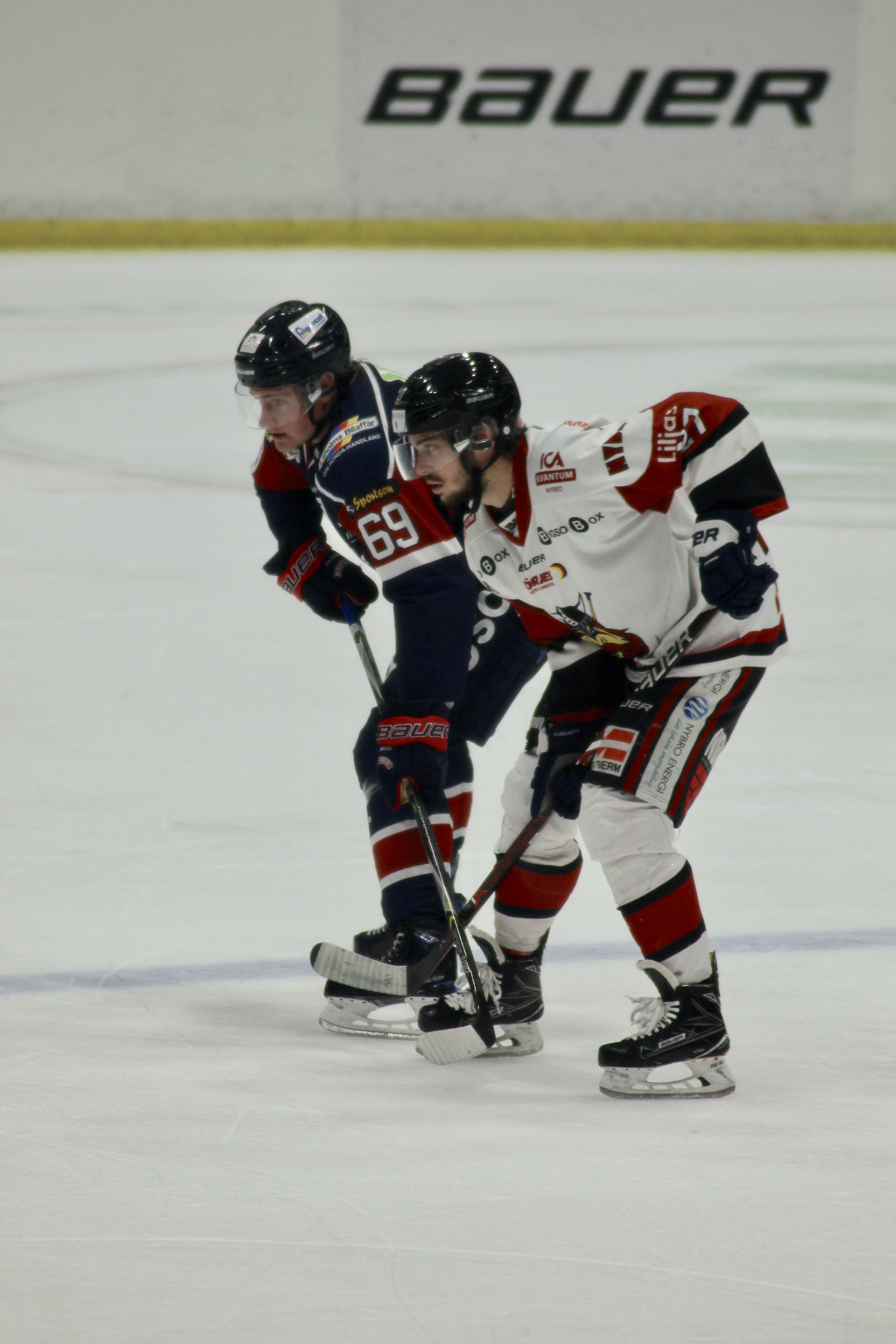
Simon Mattson, right winger

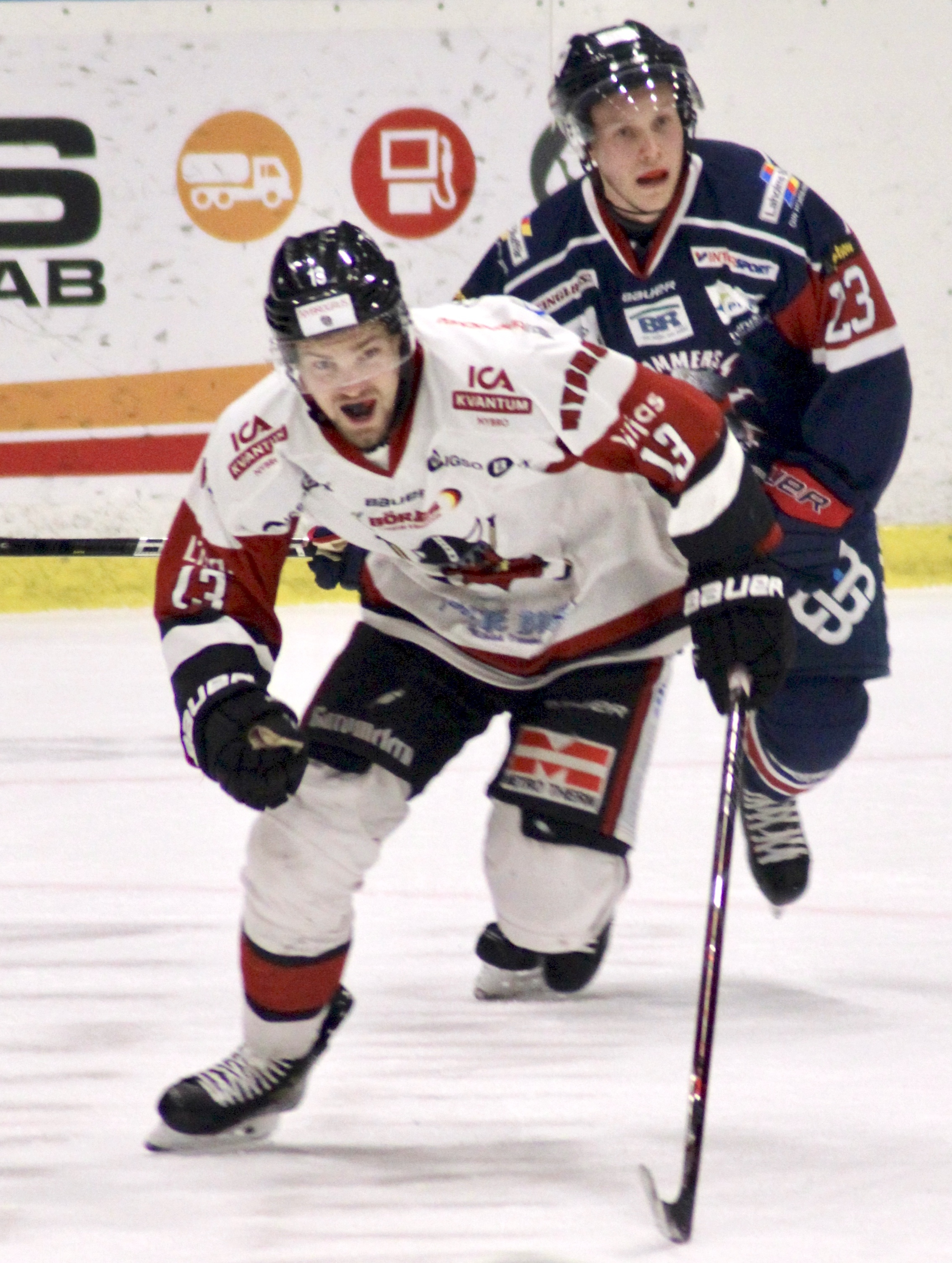
Patrik Fransson, winger
