= Johan Johnsson (ice hockey) =

Swedish ice hockey player

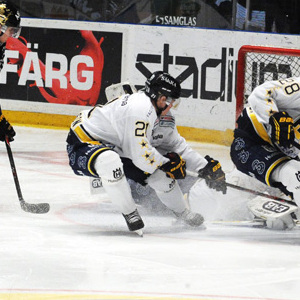
- Johnsson playing in 2014
- Born: January 16, 1993 (age 32) Jönköping, Sweden
- Height: 5 ft 10 in (178 cm)
- Weight: 185 lb (84 kg; 13 st 3 lb)
- Position: Centre
- Shoots: Left
- SHL team Former teams: Linköping HC; HV71; IK Oskarshamn
- Playing career: 2010–present

Johan Johnsson (born January 16, 1993) is a Swedish professional ice hockey player currently under contract with Linköping HC in the Swedish Hockey League (SHL).

He made his Elitserien debut playing with HV71 during the 2012–13 Elitserien season. Johnsson has also appeared in the SHL with IK Oskarshamn.
