= Joel Mustonen =

Finnish ice hockey player

- Born: September 18, 1992 (age 32); Oulu, Finland
- Height: 5 ft 10 in (178 cm)
- Weight: 174 lb (79 kg; 12 st 6 lb)
- Position: Centre
- Shoots: Left
- Allsv team Former teams: IF Björklöven; Skellefteå AIK; Timrå IK; Lahti Pelicans; Örebro HK; Frölunda HC
- Playing career: 2010–present

Joel Mustonen (born September 18, 1992) is a Finnish professional ice hockey player who is currently playing for IF Björklöven in the HockeyAllsvenskan (Allsv).

== Playing career ==
Mustonen played as a youth in Sweden and made his professional debut with Skellefteå AIK in the Elitserien in the 2010–11 season. On March 25, 2015, after two seasons in his native Finland with Lahti Pelicans of the Liiga, Mustonen agreed to a two-year contract to return to the SHL with Örebro HK.

== Awards and honours ==
Award	Year
CHL
Champions (Frölunda HC)	2019
SHL
Le Mat Trophy (Frölunda HC)	2019
