= Albin Lundin =

Swedish ice hockey player

- Born: 15 March 1996 (age 29); Stockholm, Sweden
- Height: 185 cm (6 ft 1 in)
- Weight: 84 kg (185 lb; 13 st 3 lb)
- Position: Forward
- Shoots: Left
- Allsv team Former teams: IF Björklöven; Djurgårdens IF; Skellefteå AIK; Timrå IK; Luleå HF
- Playing career: 2015–present

Albin Lundin (born 15 March 1996) is a Swedish professional ice hockey player. He is currently playing with IF Björklöven of the HockeyAllsvenskan (Allsv).

Lundin made his Swedish Hockey League debut playing with Djurgårdens IF Hockey during the 2014–15 SHL season. He has also played for Skellefteå AIK.

== Awards and honours ==
Award	Year
SHL
Le Mat Trophy (Luleå HF)	2025
