= Per Svensson (ice hockey) =

Swedish ice hockey player

- Born: 10 October 1988 (age 37) Sweden
- Height: 193 cm (6 ft 4 in)
- Weight: 88 kg (194 lb; 13 st 12 lb)
- Position: Defence
- Shoots: Left
- SHL team Former teams: Timrå IK; AIK IF; EHC Kloten
- Playing career: 2006–present

Per Svensson (born 10 October 1988) is a Swedish professional ice hockey defenceman. He is currently playing with Timrå IK of the Swedish Hockey League (SHL).

== Playing career ==
Svensson joined Almtuna IS with the 2012-13 season. He played two games with AIK IF in the Swedish Hockey League during the 2013–14 season.

On 4 February 2020, Svensson left Sweden to join EHC Kloten of the Swiss League (SL) for the remainder of the season. He was brought in as their third import player to provide depth for the playoffs and a potential promotion round.
