= Liljas Arena =

Indoor ice rink in Nybro, Sweden

Coordinates: 56°44′17″N 15°54′44″E

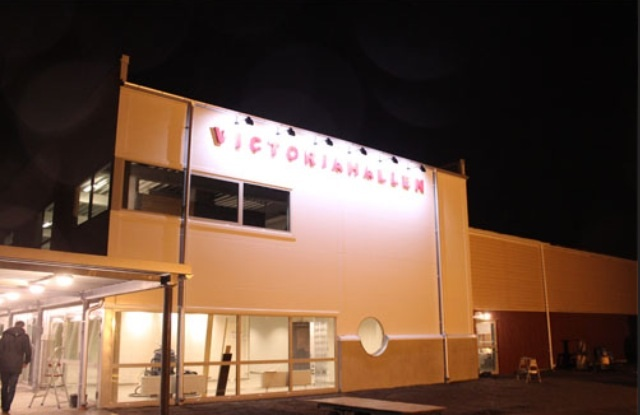
- The Liljas Arena in 2014
- Interactive map of Liljas Arena
- Address: Grönvägen 41
- Location: Nybro; Sweden
- Capacity: 2380

Construction
- Built: 1963; 63 years ago
- Renovated: 1984, 2014

Liljas Arena is an indoor ice hockey venue in Nybro, Sweden, originally built in 1963 under the name Victoriahallen. Since 2016, it has carried the sponsored name Liljas Arena. It is the fourth-oldest indoor ice hockey arena in Sweden and serves as the home venue for Nybro Vikings IF, a team currently playing in HockeyAllsvenskan, the second-highest league in Swedish ice hockey, following their promotion from Hockeyettan after the 2023–24 season.

The arena was originally completed in 1963 and underwent major renovations in 1984. It currently has a capacity of approximately 2,380 spectators, but the attendance record stands at 4,027, set during a Småland derby against Tingsryds AIF in the relegation series of the 1969–70 season. This record can no longer be matched, as modern fire safety regulations and the conversion to fixed seating have significantly reduced the legal maximum capacity.
