= IF Björklöven =

- Nickname: Löven
- City: Umeå, Sweden
- League: SHL
- Founded: May 15, 1970
- Home arena: Visionite Arena
- Colours
- General manager: Per Kenttä
- Head coach: Magnus Bogren
- Captain: Axel Ottosson
- Website: bjorkloven.com

Franchise history
- 26: Seasons in Sweden's highest division
- 3: Swedish Championship Finals appearances

Championships
- Le Mat Trophy: 1987

Ishockeyföreningen Björklöven, commonly known as IF Björklöven, (or often simply referred to as Löven) is a Swedish professional ice hockey club in Umeå, Västerbotten, in northern Sweden. The club is returning to SHL (previously Elitserien) after 25 years for the 2026-27 season, and played 15 seasons in Elitserien (1976–77, 1978–79 to 1988–89, 1993–94, 1998–99 and 2000–01, becoming national champions in 1987).

== History ==
IF Björklöven was formed in 1970 when the ice hockey sections of IFK Umeå and Sandåkerns SK were merged. The IFK Umeå team had already at times been referred to as 'björklöven' (the birch leaves) as a tongue in cheek reference to Canadian ice hockey and Umeå being known as the 'city of birch trees', and after the merger the nickname became the official team name.

The team was quite successful at the Elitserien (SEL) level, the highest league in Sweden, during the 1980s and won the Swedish championship in 1987. They were, however, relegated only two years later, and since then have not been able to establish themselves permanently in the Elitserien again. Instead, they have mostly played in the second-tier league Allsvenskan, save for a few short stints in the 90s. Some notable players from Björklöven are Calle Johansson, Ulf Dahlén, Tore Öqvist and twins Patrik Sundström and Peter Sundström.

From 2001 to 2010, Björklöven played in HockeyAllsvenskan, the second highest ice hockey league for men in Sweden. Although the team finished 12th in the 2009–10 HockeyAllsvenskan season (which meant that the team was set to play in HockeyAllsvenskan the following season), the club was in big economical problems in March–May 2010. The club went bankrupt in April 2010, but got the bankruptcy allayed a month later. Despite huge further efforts by the club to obtain an elite license to play in HockeyAllsvenskan the following season, the Swedish Ice Hockey Association (SIHA) decided not to give Björklöven an elite license and thus the team was relegated to the third-tier league Division 1 for the 2010–11 season. Björklöven was eventually promoted back to HockeyAllsvenskan in the 2012–13 season.

The team has recently had many promising young players, including Alexander Hellström, Alexander Sundström, Patrik Nevalainen, Daniel Rahimi and Kristofer Berglund. Due to lack of funds however, Björklöven lost all of these young players to other teams, although Hellström, Sundström, Nevalainen and Rahimi later rejoined the team.

== Björklöven Dam ==
Björklöven's women's side currently plays in Damettan, in the north division of the second tier of Swedish women's hockey. Ahead of the 2018–19 SDHL season, the club hosted the Damcup Umeå exhibition tournament between Björklöven, Luleå HF/MSSK, Modo Hockey, and the Japanese national team. Luleå were crowned winners of the tournament after winning all three of their games.

== Season-by-season records ==
List of Björklöven seasons
Season	Level	Division	Record		Avg. home atnd.	Notes	Ref
Season	Level	Division	Position	W-OT-L	Avg. home atnd.	Notes	Ref
This is a partial list, featuring the five most recent seasons. For a more complete list, see List of IF Björklöven seasons
2021–22	Tier 2	HockeyAllsvenskan	4th of 14	26–7–6–13	3,855		
2021–22	Tier 2	HockeyAllsvenskan Playoffs	–	8–2–2–6	5,176	Won in quarterfinals, 4–1 vs Västerås IK; Won in semifinals, 4–3 vs Modo Hockey; Lost in finals, 2–4 vs HV71	
2022–23	Tier 2	HockeyAllsvenskan	2nd of 14	29–7–5–11	4,605		
2022–23	Tier 2	HockeyAllsvenskan Playoffs	–	5–1–1–4	4,976	Won in quarterfinals, 4–1 vs Västerås IK; Lost in semifinals, 2–4 vs Djurgårdens IF	
2023–24	Tier 2	HockeyAllsvenskan	6th of 14	21–8–6–17	4,639		
2023–24	Tier 2	HockeyAllsvenskan Playoffs	–	1–0–2–2	5,001	Lost in quarterfinals, 1–4 vs Djurgårdens IF	
2024–25	Tier 2	HockeyAllsvenskan	4th of 14	28–4–6–14	4,659		
2024–25	Tier 2	HockeyAllsvenskan Playoffs	–	3–0–2–2	5,038	Lost in quarterfinals, 3–4 vs AIK	
2025–26	Tier 2	HockeyAllsvenskan	1st of 14	34–7–3–8	4,558		
2025–26	Tier 2	HockeyAllsvenskan Playoffs	–	10–2–0–1	5,042	Won in quarterfinals, 4–0 vs IK Oskarshamn; Won in quarterfinals, 4–1 vs Södertälje SK; Won in finals, 4–0 vs BIK Karlskoga	

== Players and personnel ==
=== Current roster ===
Updated August 5 2026.

No.	Nat	Player	Pos	S/G	Age	Acquired	Birthplace
28	(Sweden)	Emil Alba	LW	L	29	2026	Stockholm, Sweden
57	(Sweden)	Alfred Barklund	D	L	25	2026	Stockholm, Sweden
47	(Sweden)	Marcus Björk	D	R	28	2025	Umeå, Sweden
24	(Sweden)	Linus Cronholm	D	L	26	2022	Malmö, Sweden
44	(United States)	Josiah Didier	D	R	33	2026	Littleton, Colorado, United States
88	(Canada)	Chris DiDomenico	C/RW	R	37	2026	Woodbridge, Ontario, Canada
34	(Canada)	Phil Di Giuseppe	LW	L	32	2026	Maple, Ontario, Canada
16	(Sweden)	Lucas Ekeståhl Jonsson	D	L	30	2026	Stockholm, Sweden
56	(Sweden)	Fredrik Forsberg	RW	R	29	2024	Uppsala, Sweden
77	(Sweden)	Philip Hemmyr	C	L	19	2024	Umeå, Sweden
86	(Sweden)	Robin Kovács	LW	L	29	2024	Stockholm, Sweden
37	(Finland)	Lenni Killinen	RW	L	26	2024	Espoo, Finland
30	(Finland)	Lassi Lehtinen	G	L	27	2026	Lahti, Finland
33	(Sweden)	Albin Lundin	C	L	30	2025	Stockholm, Sweden
64	(Sweden)	Anton Malmström	D	L	26	2025	Haninge, Sweden
39	(Finland)	Joel Mustonen	C	L	34	2022	Oulu, Finland
7	(Finland)	Topi Niemelä	D	R	24	2026	Oulu, Finland
10	(Sweden)	Marcus Nilsson	LW	L	35	2024	Charlottenberg, Sweden
18	(Sweden)	Axel Ottosson (C)	C	L	30	2024	Umeå, Sweden
71	(Sweden)	Gustav Possler	LW	L	31	2020	Södertälje, Sweden
11	(Finland)	Tarmo Reunanen	D	L	28	2026	Äänekoski, Finland
93	(Canada)	Tristen Robins	C/RW	R	24	2026	London, England
91	(Sweden)	Oscar Tellström	RW	L	24	2024	Luleå, Sweden
50	(Finland)	Frans Tuohimaa	G	L	35	2025	Helsinki, Finland
32	(Sweden)	Lucas Wallmark	C	L	31	2026	Umeå, Sweden

=== Team captains ===
- John Slettvoll, 1976–77
- Ulf Lundström, 1977–80
- Torbjörn Andersson, 1981–83
- Rolf Berglund, 1983–86
- Peter Andersson, 1986–89
- Ulf Andersson, 1989–90
- Peter Andersson, 1990–93
- Patrik Sundström, 1993–94
- Peter Andersson, 1994–95
- Jens Öhman, 1995–96
- Robert Ljunggren, 1996–97
- Peder Bejegård, 1997–98
- Jens Öhman, 1998–99
- Christian Lechtaler, 1999–01
- Göran Hermansson, 2001–02
- Jörgen Hermansson, 2002–05
- Mats Lavander, 2005–07
- Magnus Gästrin, 2007–09
- Fredrik Öberg, 2009–10
- Martin Johansson, 2010–11
- Johan Jarl, 2011–13
- Mats Lavander, 2013–14
- Stefan Öhman, 2014–17
- Fredric Andersson, 2017–24
- Axel Ottosson, 2024–present

=== Honored members ===
IF Björklöven retired numbers
No.	Player	Position	Career	No. retirement
9	Aleksandrs Beļavskis	RW	1991–2003	–
17	Patrik Sundström	RW	1978–1982, 1992–1994	–
23	Roger Hägglund	D	1977–1983, 1985–1992	–
27	Tore Ökvist	F	1974–1988	–

=== Notable players ===
- Ric Jackman
- Greg Parks
- Andrew Raycroft
- Brian Watts
- François Rozenthal
- Maurice Rozenthal
- Peter Andersson
- Mikael Andersson
- Ulf Dahlén
- Calle Johansson
- Peter Sundström
- Brad DeFauw

Preceded by Färjestad BK	Swedish ice hockey champions 1987	Succeeded by Färjestad BK
