= Fredrik Forsberg (ice hockey, born December 1996) =

Swedish professional ice hockey player

- Born: December 12, 1996 (age 29) Uppsala, Sweden
- Height: 6 ft 0 in (183 cm)
- Weight: 185 lb (84 kg; 13 st 3 lb)
- Position: Forward
- Shoots: Right
- Allsv team Former teams: IF Björklöven; Leksands IF; HV71
- Playing career: 2013–present

Fredrik Forsberg (born December 12, 1996) is a Swedish professional ice hockey player. He is currently playing with IF Björklöven of the HockeyAllsvenskan (Allsv).

Forsberg made his Swedish Hockey League debut playing with Leksands IF during the 2013–14 SHL season. He has also featured in the SHL with HV71.

== Personal life ==
Fredrik is the younger brother of Filip Forsberg who was drafted 11th overall in the 2012 NHL entry draft by the Washington Capitals. Filip now plays for the Nashville Predators. The brothers are of no relation to former NHL star Peter Forsberg.
