= List of Södertälje SK seasons =

This is a list of seasons of Swedish ice hockey club Södertälje SK.

| Season | Level | Division | Record | | Avg. home atnd. | Notes | Ref. |
| Season | Level | Division | Position | W-T-L W-OT-L | Avg. home atnd. | Notes | Ref. |
|---|---|---|---|---|---|---|---|
| 1994–95 | Tier 2 | Division 1 East | 3rd | 9–6–3 | | | |
| 1994–95 | Tier 2 | Division 1 East continuation | 1st | 12–0–2 | | | |
| 1994–95 | Tier 2 | Playoff to Elitserien qualifiers | — | 1–2 | 2,108 | Lost in 1st round, 1–2 in games vs IK Pantern | |
| 1995–96 | Tier 2 | Division 1 East | 1st | 16–2–0 | | | |
| 1995–96 | Tier 2 | Allsvenskan | 2nd | 9–4–5 | 3,006 | | |
| 1995–96 | Tier 2 | Allsvenskan finals | — | 3–1 | 6,834 | Won 3–1 in games vs Brynäs ▲ Promoted to Elitserien | |
| 1996–97 | Tier 1 | Elitserien | 11th | 15–7–28 | 2,835 | | |
| 1996–97 | Elitserien qualifiers | | 1st | 7–1–2 | 4,309 | | |
| 1997–98 | Tier 1 | Elitserien | 12th | 10–12–24 | | | |
| 1997–98 | Elitserien qualifiers | | 3rd | 5–1–4 | | ▼ Relegated to Division 1 | |
| 1998–99 | Tier 2 | Division 1 East | 1st | 20–3–5 | | | |
| 1998–99 | Tier 2 | Allsvenskan | 1st | 9–3–2 | | | |
| 1998–99 | Elitserien qualifiers | | 4th | 3–3–4 | | | |
| 1999–00 | Tier 2 | Allsvenskan North | 3rd | 19–3–3–7 | 1,562 | | |
| 1999–00 | Tier 2 | SuperAllsvenskan | 2nd | 7–3–2–2 | 2,832 | | |
| 1999–00 | Elitserien qualifiers | | 5th | 3–0–1–6 | 3,398 | | |
| 2000–01 | Tier 2 | Allsvenskan North | 4th | 14–3–2–7 | 1,439 | | |
| 2000–01 | Tier 2 | SuperAllsvenskan | 1st | 8–1–0–5 | 3,087 | | |
| 2000–01 | Elitserien qualifiers | | 1st | 6–1–2–1 | 5,023 | ▲ Promoted to Elitserien | |
| 2001–02 | Tier 1 | Elitserien | 9th | 13–5–12–20 | 4,297 | | |
| 2002–03 | Tier 1 | Elitserien | 9th | 17–6–3–24 | 4,038 | | |
| 2003–04 | Tier 1 | Elitserien | 9th | 18–2–6–24 | 4,393 | | |
| 2004–05 | Tier 1 | Elitserien | 8th | 16–9–25 | 4,263 | | |
| 2004–05 | Tier 1 | Championship playoffs | — | 4–6 | 6,310 | Won in quarterfinals, 4–2 vs Linköping; Lost in semifinals, 0–4 vs Färjestad | |
| 2005–06 | Tier 1 | Elitserien | 11th | 11–10–29 | 3,622 | | |
| 2005–06 | Elitserien qualifiers | | 3rd | 5–2–3 | 4,110 | ▼ Relegated to HockeyAllsvenskan | |
| 2006–07 | Tier 2 | HockeyAllsvenskan | 1st | 32–9–4 | 2,801 | | |
| 2006–07 | Elitserien qualifiers | | 2nd | 4–5–1 | 5,199 | ▲ Promoted to Elitserien | |
| 2007–08 | Tier 1 | Elitserien | 9th | 18–13–24 | 4,270 | | |
| 2008–09 | Tier 1 | Elitserien | 12th | 12–15–28 | 3,817 | | |
| 2008–09 | Elitserien qualifiers | | 1st | 6–1–2–1 | 4,497 | | |
| 2009–10 | Tier 1 | Elitserien | 11th | 14–14–27 | 3,644 | | |
| 2009–10 | Elitserien qualifiers | | 1st | 5–1–4–0 | 4,678 | | |
| 2010–11 | Tier 1 | Elitserien | 11th | 20–2–7–26 | 4,230 | | |
| 2010–11 | Elitserien qualifiers | | 3rd | 4–2–1–3 | 3,795 | ▼ Relegated to HockeyAllsvenskan | |
| 2011–12 | Tier 2 | HockeyAllsvenskan | 9th | 22–2–6–22 | 3,232 | | |
| 2012–13 | Tier 2 | HockeyAllsvenskan | 2nd | 29–7–2–14 | 3,644 | | |
| 2012–13 | Elitserien qualifiers | | 6th | 2–0–1–7 | 4,026 | | |
| 2013–14 | Tier 2 | HockeyAllsvenskan | 12th | 16–6–6–24 | 3,036 | | |
| 2014–15 | Tier 2 | HockeyAllsvenskan | 14th | 10–10–5–27 | 3,033 | | |
| 2014–15 | HockeyAllsvenskan qualifiers | | 6th | 3–0–1–6 | 2,941 | ▼ Relegated to Hockeyettan | |
| 2015–16 | Tier 3 | HockeyAllsvenskan East | 1st of 12 | 19–0–0–3 | 2,422 | | |
| 2015–16 | Tier 3 | Allettan South | 2nd of 8 | 9–1–1–3 | 3,168 | | |
| 2015–16 | Tier 3 | Playoffs | — | 5–1–0–2 | 3,278 | Round 1: won 2–0 in games vs Halmstad HF; Round 2: won 2–1 in games vs Piteå HC; Round 3: won 2–1 in games vs Kristianstads IK | |
| 2015–16 | HockeyAllsvenskan qualifiers | | 1st of 6 | 6–2–0–2 | 3,857 | ▲ Promoted to HockeyAllsvenskan | |
| 2016–17 | Tier 2 | HockeyAllsvenskan | 14th of 14 | 13–4–3–32 | 2,650 | | |
| 2016–17 | HockeyAllsvenskan qualifiers | | TBD | TBD | TBD | | |
