= List of Leksands IF seasons =

This is a list of seasons of Leksand-based Swedish ice hockey club Leksands IF.

Year	Level	Division	Record		Avg. home atnd.	Notes	Ref.
Year	Level	Division	Position	W-T-L W-OT-L	Avg. home atnd.	Notes	Ref.
1990–91	Tier 1	Elitserien, first half	11th	8–3–11		▼ Relegated to Allsvenskan for second half	
1990–91	Tier 2	Allsvenskan	2nd	10–6–2			
1990–91	Tier 2	Allsvenskan Final	—	3–1	5,487	Won vs Västra Frölunda HC (6–3, 2–1, 2–8, 5–1) ▲ Re-qualified for play in 1991–92 Elitserien	
1991–92	Tier 1	Elitserien, first half	11th	3–9–10		▼ Relegated to Allsvenskan for second half	
1991–92	Tier 2	Allsvenskan	2nd	11–3–4			
1991–92	Tier 2	Allsvenskan Final	—	2–3	5,503	Lost vs Rögle BK (3–2, 3–4, 2–5, 4–2, 3–4)	
1991–92	1992 Elitserien qualifier		1st	5–0–1	4,143	▲ Re-qualified for play in 1992–93 Elitserien	
1992–93	Tier 1	Elitserien	7th	17–4–19			
1992–93	Tier 1	Swedish Championship playoffs	—	0–2	4,310	Lost in quarterfinals, 0–2 vs Brynäs IF	
1993–94	Tier 1	Elitserien	1st	22–6–12			
1993–94	Tier 1	Swedish Championship playoffs	—	1–3	3,976	Lost in quarterfinals, 1–3 vs MoDo	
1994–95	Tier 1	Elitserien	4th	21–6–13			
1994–95	Tier 1	Swedish Championship playoffs	—	1–3	4,833	Lost in quarterfinals, 1–3 vs Brynäs IF	
1995–96	Tier 1	Elitserien	7th	15–10–15	3,826		
1995–96	Tier 1	Swedish Championship playoffs	—	2–3	5,172	Lost in quarterfinals, 2–3 vs Västra Frölunda HC	
1996–97	Tier 1	Elitserien	1st	28–7–15			
1996–97	Tier 1	Swedish Championship playoffs	—	3–1	5,273	Won in quarterfinals, 3–1 vs Malmö IF; Lost in semifinals, 2–3 vs Färjestads BK	
1997–98	Tier 1	Elitserien	3rd	24–8–14			
1997–98	Tier 1	Swedish Championship playoffs	—	1–3	4,142	Lost in quarterfinals, 1–3 vs MoDo Hockey	
1998–99	Tier 1	Elitserien	4th	20–14–16			
1998–99	Tier 1	Swedish Championship playoffs	—	1–3	4,838	Lost in quarterfinals, 1–4 vs Luleå HF	
1999–00	Tier 1	Elitserien	10th	14–12–24	3,890		
2000–01	Tier 1	Elitserien	11th	16–6–28	4,314		
2000–01	2001 Elitserien qualifier		4th	4–3–3	4,588	▼ Relegated to Allsvenskan	
2001–02	Tier 2	Allsvenskan Södra	1st	30–1–1	3,551		
2001–02	Tier 2	SuperAllsvenskan	1st	12–1–1	3,472		
2001–02	2002 Elitserien qualifier		2nd	7–3–0	5,491	▲ Promoted to Elitserien	
2002–03	Tier 1	Elitserien	8th	19–6–25	5,241		
2002–03	Tier 1	Swedish Championship playoffs	—	1–4	5,984	Lost in quarterfinals, 1–4 vs Färjestad	
2003–04	Tier 1	Elitserien	12th	11–17–22	4,972		
2003–04	2004 Elitserien qualifier		4th	3–3–4	4,044	▼ Relegated to Allsvenskan	
2004–05	Tier 2	Allsvenskan Norra	1st	26–2–4	2,925		
2004–05	Tier 2	SuperAllsvenskan	1st	8–4–2	4,481		
2004–05	2005 Elitserien qualifier		1st	5–4–1	5,682	▲ Promoted to Elitserien	
2005–06	Tier 1	Elitserien	12th	9–11–30	6,487		
2005–06	2006 Elitserien qualifier		5th	3–1–6	4,147	▼ Relegated to HockeyAllsvenskan	
2006–07	Tier 2	HockeyAllsvenskan	3rd	28–9–8	4,127		
2006–07	2007 Elitserien qualifier		5th	3–1–6	4,536		
2007–08	Tier 2	HockeyAllsvenskan	1st	33–6–6	5,152		
2007–08	2008 Elitserien qualifier		5th	4–1–5	7,315		
2008–09	Tier 2	HockeyAllsvenskan	1st	30–5–1–9	5,300		
2008–09	2009 Elitserien qualifier		4th	4-1–0–5	6,917		
2009–10	Tier 2	HockeyAllsvenskan	1st	31–4–6–11	4,785		
2009–10	2010 Elitserien qualifier		4th	4–2–0–4	7,093		
2010–11	Tier 2	HockeyAllsvenskan	4th	23–7–7–15	4,842		
2010–11	Tier 2	Pre-qualifier	3rd	2–1–0–3	2,445		
2011–12	Tier 2	HockeyAllsvenskan	2nd	27–7–5–13	4,820		
2011–12	2012 Elitserien qualifier		4th	3–1–1–5	7,002		
2012–13	Tier 2	HockeyAllsvenskan	1st	31–5–6–10	5,000		
2012–13	2013 Elitserien qualifier		2nd	7–0–1–2	7,396	▲ Promoted to Elitserien (later renamed SHL)	
2013–14	Tier 1	SHL	7th	23–5–4–23	6,574		
2013–14	Tier 1	Swedish Championship playoffs	—	1–0–0–2	6,240	Lost in 1st round 1–2 in games vs HV71	
2014–15	Tier 1	SHL	11th	23–5–4–23	6,574		
2014–15	SHL qualifiers		—	2–1–0–4	6,240	Lost 3–4 in games to the Malmö Redhawks ▼ Relegated to HockeyAllsvenskan	
2015–16	Tier 2	HockeyAllsvenskan	4th	24–3–7–18	4,576		
2015–16	Tier 2	HockeyAllsvenskan Playoffs	1st	3–0–0–2	5,618		
2015–16	Tier 2	Playoff to the SHL qualifiers	—	2–0–0–0	7,650	Won 2–0 in games vs Tingsryds AIF	
2015–16	SHL qualifiers		—	2–2–0–3	7,294	Won 4–3 in games vs MODO Hockey ▲ Promoted to the SHL	
2016–17	Tier 1	SHL	14th	12–1–5–34	5,737		
2016–17	SHL qualifiers		—	2–0–0–4	7,186	Lost 2–4 in games to Mora IK ▼ Relegated to HockeyAllsvenskan	
2017–18	Tier 2	HockeyAllsvenskan	2nd	26–3–7–16	5,141		
2017–18	Tier 2	HockeyAllsvenskan finals	—	0–0–1–2	5,954	Lost 0–3 in games vs Timrå IK	
2017–18	Tier 2	Playoff to SHL qualifiers	—	1–1–0–1	4,603	Won 2–1 in games to IK Oskarshamn	
2017–18	SHL qualifiers		—	1–0–0–4	7,557	Lost 1–4 in games to Mora IK	
2018–19	Tier 2	HockeyAllsvenskan	4th	25–5–5–17	4,666		
2018–19	Tier 2	HockeyAllsvenskan Playoffs	1st	3–2–0–0	4,954		
2018–19	Tier 2	Playoff to the SHL qualifiers	—	2–0–0–0	7,650	Won 2–0 in games vs AIK IF	
2018–19	SHL qualifiers		—	3–1–0–1	7,650	Won 4–1 in games vs Mora IK ▲ Promoted to the SHL	
2019–20	Tier 1	SHL	13th	13–2–6–31	5,795		
2020–21	Tier 1	SHL	3rd	25–7–5–15	22		
2020–21	Tier 1	Swedish Championship playoffs	—	0–0–1–3	16	Lost in 1st round 0–4 in games vs Örebro HK	
2021–22	Tier 1	SHL	8th	20–4–7–21	5,270		
2021–22	Tier 1	Eighth-finals	—	1–0–0–2	6,154	Lost 1–2 in games vs IK Oskarshamn	
2022–23	Tier 1	SHL	8th	22–5–1–24	6,065		
2022–23	Tier 1	Eighth-finals	—	0–1–0–2	5,508	Lost 1–2 in games vs Rögle BK	
2023–24	Tier 1	SHL	5th	27–3–5–17	6,485		
2023–24	Tier 1	Swedish Championship playoffs	—	2–1–2–2	7,650	Lost in 1st round 3–4 in games vs Frölunda HC	
2024–25	Tier 1	SHL	11th	19–3–8–22	6,556		
