= List of AIK IF seasons =

This is a list of seasons of Stockholm, Sweden-based ice hockey club AIK IF.

Season	Level	Division	Record		Avg. home atnd.	Notes	Ref.
Season	Level	Division	Position	W-T-L W-OT-L	Avg. home atnd.	Notes	Ref.
1983–84	Tier 1	Elitserien	1st	19–6–11			
1983–84	Swedish Championship playoffs		—	5–0–0–1	9,695	Won in semifinals, 2–1 in games vs Södertälje SK; Won in finals, 3–0 in games vs Djurgårdens IF; (gold) 1984 Swedish Champions (7th title)	
1984–85	Tier 1	Elitserien	8th	16–1–19			
1985–86	Tier 1	Elitserien	10th	8–5–23		▼ Relegated to Division 1	
1986–87	Tier 2	Division 1 West	1st	18–0–0			
1986–87	Tier 2	Allsvenskan	1st	12–1–1		▲ Promoted to Elitserien	
1987–88	Tier 1	Elitserien	8th	17–4–19			
1987–88	Swedish Championship playoffs		—	1–1–0–3	9,225	Won in quarterfinals, 2–1 in games vs Djurgårdens IF; Lost in semifinals, 0–2 in games vs Färjestads BK	
1988–89	Tier 1	Elitserien	7th	19–2–19			
1988–89	Swedish Championship playoffs		—	0–0–0–2	13,850	Lost in quarterfinals, 0–2 in games vs Djurgårdens IF	
1989–90	Tier 1	Elitserien	8th	17–1–22			
1989–90	Swedish Championship playoffs		—	1–0–0–2	13,850	Lost in quarterfinals, 1–2 in games vs Färjestads BK	
1990–91	Tier 1	Elitserien	9th	13–8–19			
1991–92	Tier 1	Elitserien	7th	19–4–17			
1991–92	Swedish Championship playoffs		—	1–0–0–2	11,098	Lost in quarterfinals, 1–2 in games vs Malmö IF	
1992–93	Tier 1	Elitserien (autumn)	12th	5–4–13		▼ Relegated to Allsvenskan for spring semester	
1992–93	Tier 2	Allsvenskan	4th	10–4–4	4,627	Bye to Playoff 3	
1992–93	Tier 2	Playoff to Elitserien qualifier	—	0–0–0–2	12,147	Round 3: Lost to Hammarby IF, 0–2 in games	
1993–94	Tier 2	Division 1 East	1st	17–3–2			
1993–94	Tier 2	Allsvenskan	3rd	10–4–4		Bye to Playoff 3	
1993–94	Tier 2	Playoff to Elitserien qualifier	—	2–0–0–1		Won round 3, 2–1 in games vs Skellefteå AIK	
1993–94	Elitserien qualifier		1st	3–2–1	6,218	▲ Promoted to Elitserien	
1994–95	Tier 1	Elitserien	9th	11–8–21			
1995–96	Tier 1	Elitserien	9th	11–11–18	6,480		
1996–97	Tier 1	Elitserien	5th	23–10–17	7,245		
1996–97	Swedish Playoff championships		—	3–0–0–4	12,829	Won in quarterfinals, 3–1 vs Djurgården IF; Lost in semifinals, 0–3 vs Luleå HF	
1997–98	Tier 1	Elitserien	11th	13–7–26			
1997–98	Elitserien qualifier		1st	8–0–2	5,546		
1998–99	Tier 1	Elitserien	10th	18–11–21			
1999–00	Tier 1	Elitserien	9th	19–12–19	6,043		
2000–01	Tier 1	Elitserien	7th	18–11–21	5,997		
2000–01	Swedish Championship playoffs		—	1–4	11,534	Lost in quarterfinals, 1–4 vs Djurgården	
2001–02	Tier 1	Elitserien	11th	15–7–28	4,196		
2001–02	Elitserien qualifier		3rd	5–1–4	3,984	▼ Relegated to Allsvenskan	
2002–03	Tier 2	Allsvenskan Norra	4th	16–6–6	1,872		
2002–03	Tier 2	SuperAllsvenskan	6th	4–3–7	2,446		
2002–03	Tier 2	Playoff to Elitserien qualifier	—	4–0	2,180	1st round: 2–0, 2nd round: 2–0	
2002–03	Elitserien qualifier		4th	4–0–6	2,607		
2003–04	Tier 2	Allsvenskan Norra	4th	16–7–9	2,413		
2003–04	Tier 2	SuperAllsvenskan	5th	5–4–5	3,433		
2003–04	Tier 2	Playoff to Elitserien qualifier	—	4–1	3,415	1st round: 2–0, 2nd round: 2–1	
2003–04	Elitserien qualifier		5th	2–3–5	3,305	▼ Relegated to Division 1 due to financial situation.	
2004–05	Tier 3	Division 1B	1st	27–6–3	941		
2004–05	HockeyAllsvenskan qualifier (south)		1st	6–2–2	3,999	▲ Promoted to HockeyAllsvenskan	
2005–06	Tier 2	HockeyAllsvenskan	6th	16–12–14	1,783		
2006–07	Tier 2	HockeyAllsvenskan	9th	18–10–17	1,244		
2007–08	Tier 2	HockeyAllsvenskan	10th	17–6–22	1,371		
2008–09	Tier 2	HockeyAllsvenskan	2nd	29–4–12	3,185		
2008–09	Elitserien qualifier		3rd	5–0–1–4	5,432		
2009–10	Tier 2	HockeyAllsvenskan	2nd	31–8–13	2,460		
2009–10	Elitserien qualifier		2nd	5–1–1–3	5,387	▲ Promoted to Elitserien	
2010–11	Tier 1	Elitserien	8th	20–4–8–23	5,614		
2010–11	Swedish Championship playoffs		—	4–4	9,402	Won in quarterfinals, 4–0 vs HV71; Lost in semifinals, 0–4 vs Färjestad	
2011–12	Tier 1	Elitserien	7th	19–8–9–19	5,450		
2011–12	Swedish Championship playoffs		—	7–5	8,094	Won in quarterfinals, 4–1 vs Luleå; Lost in semifinals, 3–4 vs Skellefteå	
2012–13	Tier 1	Elitserien	9th	16–7–7–25	4,998		
2013–14	Tier 1	SHL	12th	12–6–7–30	4,788		
2013–14	SHL qualifier		5th	3–0–2–5	6,729	▼ Relegated to HockeyAllsvenskan	
2014–15	Tier 2	HockeyAllsvenskan	13th	16–5–7–24	3,513		
2014–15	HockeyAllsvenskan qualifier		1st	4–4–0–2	2,867		
2015–16	Tier 2	HockeyAllsvenskan	1st	28–9–3–12	4,530		
2015–16	Tier 2	HockeyAllsvenskan finals	—	2–1–0–2	6,897	Won 3–2 vs Tingsryds AIF	
2015–16	SHL qualifiers		—	1–0–1–3	7,706	Lost 4–1 vs Karlskrona HK	
2016–17	Tier 2	HockeyAllsvenskan	5th	23–5–6–18	3,872		
2016–17	Tier 2	HockeyAllsvenskan playoffs	1st	4–0–1–0	5,111		
2016–17	Tier 2	Playoff to SHL qualifiers	—	1–0–1–1	7,394	Lost 2–1 vs BIK Karlskoga	
2017–18	Tier 2	HockeyAllsvenskan	3rd	23–6–4–19	4,304		
2017–18	Tier 2	HockeyAllsvenskan playoffs	4th	1–1–1–2	3,298		
2018–19	Tier 2	HockeyAllsvenskan	1st	30–5–9–8	4,698		
2018–19	Tier 2	HockeyAllsvenskan finals	—	1–1–0–3	7,307	Lost 2–3 vs IK Oskarshamn	
2018–19	Tier 2	Playoff to SHL qualifiers	—	0–0–0–2	5,930	Lost 0–2 vs Leksands IF	
2019–20	Tier 2	HockeyAllsvenskan	14th	10–1-9–32	2,935		
2020–21	Tier 2	HockeyAllsvenskan	9th	19–8-3–22	11		
2020–21	Tier 2	Eighth-finals	—	2–0–0–0	0	Won 2–0 vs Tingsryds AIF	
2020–21	Tier 2	HockeyAllsvenskan playoffs	—	1–0–1–2	0	Lost in quarterfinals, 1–3 vs Timrå IK	
2021–22	Tier 2	HockeyAllsvenskan	9th	22–4-0–26	2,842		
2021–22	Tier 2	Eighth-finals	—	0–0–0–2	2,214	Lost 0–2 vs Västerviks IK	
2022–23	Tier 2	HockeyAllsvenskan	10th	17–4-6–25	4,107		
2022–23	Tier 2	Eighth-finals	—	2–0–0–0	2,216	Won 2–0 vs Almtuna IS	
2022–23	Tier 2	HockeyAllsvenskan playoffs	—	1–1–0–4	5,238	Lost in quarterfinals, 2–4 vs MoDo Hockey	
2023–24	Tier 2	HockeyAllsvenskan	3rd	25–7-6–14	4,631		
2023–24	Tier 2	HockeyAllsvenskan playoffs	—	2–0–2–2	5,381	Lost in quarterfinals, 2–4 vs Mora IK	
2024–25	Tier 2	HockeyAllsvenskan	5th	27–7-1–17	4,564		
2024–25	Tier 2	HockeyAllsvenskan playoffs	—	4–5–2–7	7,809	Won in quarterfinals, 4–3 vs IF Björklöven; Won in semifinals, 4–2 vs BIK Karlskoga; Lost in Finals, 1–4 vs Djurgårdens IF	
