= List of Rögle BK seasons =

This is a list of seasons of Ängelholm-based Swedish ice hockey club Rögle BK.

| Season | Level | Division | Record | | Avg. home atnd. | Notes | Ref. |
| Season | Level | Division | Position | W-T-L W-OT-L | Avg. home atnd. | Notes | Ref. |
|---|---|---|---|---|---|---|---|
| 1999–00 | Tier 2 | Allsvenskan South | 1st | 20–5–2–5 | 1,747 | | |
| 1999–00 | Tier 2 | SuperAllsvenskan | 4th | 7–1–3–3 | 2,835 | | |
| 1999–00 | Tier 2 | Playoffs (Round 1) | — | 1–0–2–0 | 2,504 | vs Skellefteå AIK | |
| 2000–01 | Tier 2 | Allsvenskan South | 3rd | 15–2–7–4 | 1,685 | | |
| 2000–01 | Tier 2 | SuperAllsvenskan | 8th | 3–1–1–9 | 1,953 | | |
| 2001–02 | Tier 2 | Allsvenskan South | 2nd | 20–1–0–11 | 2,166 | | |
| 2001–02 | Tier 2 | SuperAllsvenskan | 7th | 4–1–1–8 | 2,539 | | |
| 2002–03 | Tier 2 | Allsvenskan South | 1st | 18–3–3–4 | 1,940 | | |
| 2002–03 | Tier 2 | SuperAllsvenskan | 2nd | 8–1–2–3 | 3,888 | | |
| 2002–03 | Elitserien qualifier | | 6th | 2–0–2–6 | 3,088 | | |
| 2003–04 | Tier 2 | Allsvenskan South | 6th | 15–5–2–10 | 1,994 | | |
| 2003–04 | Tier 2 | Allsvenskan South (spring) | 3rd | 7–3–2–2 | 1,866 | | |
| 2004–05 | Tier 2 | Allsvenskan South | 1st | 19–6–5 | 2,375 | | |
| 2004–05 | Tier 2 | SuperAllsvenskan | 4th | 9–0–5 | 3,976 | | |
| 2004–05 | Tier 2 | Playoffs (Round 1) | — | 0–0–1–1 | 3,261 | vs Västerås IK Ungdom | |
| 2005–06 | Tier 2 | HockeyAllsvenskan | 4th | 21–6–15 | 2,738 | | |
| 2005–06 | Elitserien qualifier | | 4th | 5–0–5 | 3,454 | | |
| 2006–07 | Tier 2 | HockeyAllsvenskan | 2nd | 28–9–8 | 2,972 | | |
| 2006–07 | Elitserien qualifier | | 6th | 1–1–8 | 2,873 | | |
| 2007–08 | Tier 2 | HockeyAllsvenskan | 3rd | 26–8–11 | 2,655 | | |
| 2007–08 | Elitserien qualifier | | 2nd | 6–1–3 | 3,965 | ▲ Promoted to Elitserien | |
| 2008–09 | Tier 1 | Elitserien | 11th | 18–12–25 | 4,820 | | |
| 2008–09 | Elitserien qualifier | | 2nd | 5–2–5 | 4,961 | | |
| 2009–10 | Tier 1 | Elitserien | 12th | 13–12–30 | 4,162 | | |
| 2009–10 | Elitserien qualifier | | 3rd | 3–4–3 | 4,425 | ▼ Relegated to HockeyAllsvenskan | |
| 2010–11 | Tier 2 | HockeyAllsvenskan | 2nd | 26–9–2–15 | 3,119 | | |
| 2010–11 | Elitserien qualifier | | 4th | 3–2–0–5 | 3,923 | | |
| 2011–12 | Tier 2 | HockeyAllsvenskan | 5th | 21–7–8–16 | 2,973 | | |
| 2011–12 | Tier 2 | Pre-qualifier | 1st | 2–2–0-2 | 3,345 | | |
| 2011–12 | Elitserien qualifier | | 2nd | 6–0–1–3 | 4,493 | ▲ Promoted to Elitserien | |
| 2012–13 | Tier 1 | Elitserien | 12th | 10–5–6–34 | 3,886 | | |
| 2012–13 | Elitserien qualifier | | 4th | 2–1–0–7 | 3,338 | ▼ Relegated to HockeyAllsvenskan | |
| 2013–14 | Tier 2 | HockeyAllsvenskan | 7th | 21–6–5–20 | 2,971 | | |
| 2013–14 | Tier 2 | Playoffs | 1st | 4–2–0–0 | 2,676 | | |
| 2013–14 | SHL qualifiers | | 3rd | 4–2–1–3 | 4,394 | | |
| 2014–15 | Tier 2 | HockeyAllsvenskan | 4th | 22–6–7–17 | 3,008 | | |
| 2014–15 | Tier 2 | Playoffs | 1st | 2–3–0–0 | 2,421 | | |
| 2014–15 | SHL qualifiers | | — | 4–0–0–1 | 4,939 | Won 4–1 in games vs VIK Västerås HK ▲ Promoted to the SHL | |
| 2015–16 | Tier 1 | SHL | 11th | 16–4–6–26 | 4,305 | | |
| 2016–17 | Tier 1 | SHL | 13th | 12–4–3–33 | 3,790 | | |
| 2016–17 | SHL qualifiers | | — | 4–0–0–0 | 4,626 | Won 4–0 in games vs BIK Karlskoga | |
| 2017–18 | Tier 1 | SHL | 11th | 16–4–5–27 | 4,069 | | |
| 2018–19 | Tier 1 | SHL | 9th | 20–4–7–21 | 4,424 | | |
| 2018–19 | Eighth-finals | | — | 0–0–1–1 | 4,413 | Lost 0–2 vs HV71 | |
| 2019–20 | Tier 1 | SHL | 3rd | 25–7–3–17 | 4,848 | Playoffs cancelled due to the COVID-19 pandemic | |
| 2020–21 | Tier 1 | SHL | 2nd | 27–4–9–12 | 15 | | |
| 2020–21 | Swedish Championship playoffs | | — | 8–0–3–3 | 56 | Won in quarterfinals 4–0 vs Frölunda HC; Won in semifinals 3–2 vs Skellefteå AIK; (silver) Lost in finals 1–4 vs Växjö Lakers | |
| 2021–22 | Tier 1 | SHL | 1st | 27–5–9–11 | 4,290 | | |
| 2021–22 | Swedish Championship playoffs | | — | 6–0–1–6 | 6,291 | Won in quarterfinals 4–3 vs IK Oskarshamn; Lost in semifinals 2–4 vs Färjestad BK | |
| 2022–23 | Tier 1 | SHL | 9th | 17–4–9–22 | 5,904 | | |
| 2022–23 | Eighth-finals | | — | 2–0–1–0 | 5,534 | Won 2–1 vs Leksands IF | |
| 2022–23 | Swedish Championship playoffs | | — | 2–0–1–3 | 6,116 | Lost in quarterfinals 2–4 vs Skellefteå AIK | |
| 2023–24 | Tier 1 | SHL | 9th | 17–7–5–23 | 6,068 | | |
| 2023–24 | Eighth-finals | | — | 2–0–0–0 | 6,012 | Won 2–0 vs Timrå IK | |
| 2023–24 | Swedish Championship playoffs | | — | 5–4–1–3 | 6,267 | Won in quarterfinals 4–0 vs Färjestad BK; Won in semifinals 4–0 vs Växjö Lakers; (silver) Lost in finals 1–4 vs Skellefteå AIK | |
| 2024–25 | Tier 1 | SHL | 7th | 21–5–8–18 | 6,198 | | |
| 2024–25 | Eighth-finals | | — | 0–0–1–1 | 6,310 | Lost 0–2 vs Malmö Redhawks | |
