= List of Skellefteå AIK seasons =

This is a list of seasons of Swedish ice hockey club Skellefteå AIK.

Season	Level	Division	Record		Avg. home atnd.	Notes
Season	Level	Division	Position	W-T-L W-OT-L	Avg. home atnd.	Notes
1999–00	Tier 2	Allsvenskan North	6th	13–9–10	2,725	
1999–00	Tier 2	Allsvenskan North continuation	2nd	8–1–5	1,465	
1999–00	Tier 2	Playoff to Elitserien qual.	—	2–3	4,237	1st round: 2–1 vs Rögle, 2nd round: 0–2 vs Björklöven
2000–01	Tier 2	Allsvenskan North	3rd	16–2–8	2,465	
2000–01	Tier 2	SuperAllsvenskan	5th	5–5–4	3,222	
2000–01	Tier 2	Playoff to Elitserien qual.	—	0–2	3,186	1st round: 0–2 vs Oskarshamn
2001–02	Tier 2	Allsvenskan North	3rd	17–7–8	2,992	
2001–02	Tier 2	SuperAllsvenskan	6th	4–4–6	3,079	
2001–02	Tier 2	Playoff to Elitserien qual.	—	3–3	3,412	1st round: 2–1 vs Mora, 2nd round: 1–2 vs Björklöven
2002–03	Tier 2	Allsvenskan North	2nd	19–5–4	3,183	
2002–03	Tier 2	SuperAllsvenskan	4th	7–3–4	4,118	
2002–03	Tier 2	Playoff to Elitserien qual.	—	4–1	4,069	1st round: 2–0 vs Huddinge, 2nd round: 2–1 vs Arboga
2002–03	2003 Elitserien qualifier		3rd	4–2–4	4,068	
2003–04	Tier 2	Allsvenskan North	1st	24–6–2	3,002	
2003–04	Tier 2	SuperAllsvenskan	3rd	7–2–5	3,740	
2003–04	Tier 2	Playoff to Elitserien qual.	—	4–2	4,101	1st round: 2–1 vs Piteå, 2nd round: 2–1 vs Växjö
2003–04	2004 Elitserien qualifier		3rd	3–4–3	4,739	
2004–05	Tier 2	Allsvenskan North	2nd	21–5–6	3,187	
2004–05	Tier 2	SuperAllsvenskan	2nd	10–1–3	4,155	
2004–05	2005 Elitserien qualifier		4th	4–2–4	4,317	
2005–06	Tier 2	HockeyAllsvenskan	2nd	30–8–4	3,142	
2005–06	2006 Elitserien qualifier		2nd	7–0–3	5,064	▲ Promoted to Elitserien
2006–07	Tier 1	Elitserien	11th	18–13–24	4,403	
2006–07	2007 Elitserien qualifier		1st	6–3–1	4,155	
2007–08	Tier 1	Elitserien	8th	19–16–20	5,386	
2007–08	Swedish Championship playoffs		—	1–4	5,950	Lost in quarterfinals, 1–4 vs HV 71
2008–09	Tier 1	Elitserien	6th	21–12–22	5,294	
2008–09	Swedish Championship playoffs		—	4–7	5,852	Won in quarterfinals, 4–3 vs Linköping; Lost in semifinals, 0–4 vs Färjestad
2009–10	Tier 1	Elitserien	4th	26–9–20	4,892	
2009–10	Swedish Championship playoffs		—	5–7	5,680	Won in quarterfinals, 4–3 vs Färjestad; Lost in semifinals, 1–4 vs HV 71
2010–11	Tier 1	Elitserien	3rd	25–9–3–18	4,993	
2010–11	Swedish Championship playoffs		—	9–9	5,691	Won in quarterfinals, 4–3 vs Linköping; Won in semifinals, 4–2 vs Luleå; (silver) Lost in finals, 1–4 vs Färjestad
2011–12	Tier 1	Elitserien	2nd	26–5–7–17	5,078	
2011–12	Swedish Championship playoffs		—	10–9	5,757	Won in quarterfinals, 4–2 vs Modo; Won in semifinals, 4–3 vs AIK; (silver) Lost in finals, 2–4 vs Brynäs
2012–13	Tier 1	Elitserien	1st	34–4–4–13	5,197	
2012–13	Swedish Championship playoffs		—	12–1	5,862	Won in quarterfinals, 4–0 vs Brynäs; Won in semifinals, 4–1 vs Linköping; Won in finals, 4–0 vs Luleå; (gold) 2013 Swedish Champions (2nd title)
2013–14	Tier 1	SHL	1st	32–4–7–12	5,225	
2013–14	Swedish Championship playoffs		—	12–2	5,691	Won in quarterfinals, 4–1 vs HV71; Won in semifinals, 4–1 vs Linköping; Won in finals, 4–0 vs Färjestad; (gold) 2014 Swedish Champions (3rd title)
2014–15	Tier 1	SHL	1st	32–5–5–13	5,030	
2014–15	Swedish Championship playoffs		—	10–5	5,792	Won in quarterfinals, 4–0 vs Brynäs; Won in semifinals, 4–1 vs Linköping; (silver) Lost in finals, 2–4 vs Växjö
2015–16	Tier 1	SHL	1st	33–4–4–11	5,042	
2015–16	Swedish Championship playoffs		—	9–7	5,597	Won in quarterfinals, 4–0 vs HV71; Won in semifinals, 4–3 vs Växjö; (silver) Lost in finals, 1–4 vs Frölunda
2016–17	Tier 1	SHL	6th	25–6–3–18	5,030	
2016–17	Swedish Championship playoffs		—	3–4	5,317	Lost in quarterfinals, 3–4 vs Frölunda
2017–18	Tier 1	SHL	5th	26–3–3–20	4,642	
2017–18	Swedish Championship playoffs		—	8–8	5,534	Won in quarterfinals, 4–2 vs Färjestad; Won in semifinals, 4–2 vs Djurgården; (silver) Lost in finals, 0–4 vs Växjö
2018–19	Tier 1	SHL	5th	19–10–7–16	4,523	
2018–19	Swedish Championship playoffs		—	2–4	5,456	Lost in quarterfinals, 2–4 vs Djurgården
2019–20	Tier 1	SHL	4th	27–4–1–20	4,697	SHL playoffs were cancelled
2020–21	Tier 1	SHL	4th	24–8–5–15	18	
2020–21	Swedish Championship playoffs		—	6–5	0	Won in quarterfinals, 4–3 vs Luleå; Lost in semifinals, 2–3 vs Rögle
2021–22	Tier 1	SHL	3rd	27–5–3–17	3,709	
2021–22	Swedish Championship playoffs		—	2–4	5,431	Lost in quarterfinals, 2–4 vs Färjestad BK
2022–23	Tier 1	SHL	2nd	27–6–6–13	4,936	
2022–23	Swedish Championship playoffs		—	9–8	5,630	Won in quarterfinals, 4–2 vs Rögle; Won in semifinals, 4–2 vs Örebro; (silver) Lost in finals, 1–4 vs Växjö
2023–24	Tier 1	SHL	3rd	27–6–4–15	4,943	
2023–24	Swedish Championship playoffs		—	12–4	5,759	Won in quarterfinals, 4–0 vs Linköping; Won in semifinals, 4–3 vs Frölunda; Winner in finals, 4–1 vs Rögle; (gold) 2024 Swedish Champions (4th title)
2024–25	Tier 1	SHL	5th	25–3–3–21	5,269	
2024–25	Swedish Championship playoffs		—	5–6	5,801	Won in quarterfinals, 4–2 vs Färjestad; Lost in semifinals, 1–4 vs Brynäs
