= List of IF Björklöven seasons =

Season	Level	Division	Record		Avg. home atnd.	Notes	Ref.
Season	Level	Division	Position	W-OTW-OTL-L	Avg. home atnd.	Notes	Ref.
1999–00	Tier 2	Allsvenskan North	1st of 12	17–6–4–5	2,050		
1999–00	Tier 2	SuperAllsvenskan	3rd of 8	8–2–1–3	2,962		
1999–00	Tier 2	Playoff to Elitserien qual.	—	2–0–0–1	3,181		
1999–00	Elitserien qualifiers		2nd of 6	6–1–1–2	3,948	▲ Promoted to Elitserien	
2000–01	Tier 1	Elitserien	12th of 12	12–4–5–29	3,519		
2000–01	Elitserien qualifiers		3rd of 6	5–2–1–2	4,070	▼ Relegated to Allsvenskan	
2001–02	Tier 2	Allsvenskan North	1st of 12	26–1–1–4	2,639		
2001–02	Tier 2	SuperAllsvenskan	5th of 8	5–1–1–7	3,262		
2001–02	Tier 2	Playoff to Elitserien qual.	—	2–2–0–1	4,471	Round 1: Won 2–0 in games vs Hammarby IF; Round 2: Won 2–1 in games vs Skellefteå AIK	
2001–02	Elitserien qualifiers		4th of 6	3–0–1–6	3,827		
2002–03	Tier 2	Allsvenskan North	3rd of 12	19–3–1–5	2,772		
2002–03	Tier 2	SuperAllsvenskan	5th of 8	6–1–1–6	3,917		
2002–03	Tier 2	Playoff to Elitserien qual.	—	2–0–0–2	3,302	Round 1: Won 2–0 in games vs Mörrums GoIS IK; Round 2: Lost 2–0 in games vs AIK IF	
2003–04	Tier 2	Allsvenskan North	8th of 12	9–5–3–15	2,384		
2003–04	Tier 2	Allsvenskan North (spring)	4th of 8	7–0–3–4	2,187		
2004–05	Tier 2	Allsvenskan North	3rd of 12	19–6–7	2,947		
2004–05	Tier 2	SuperAllsvenskan	8th of 8	2–1–11	3,304		
2005–06	Tier 2	HockeyAllsvenskan	5th of 15	21–5–16	3,423		
2006–07	Tier 2	HockeyAllsvenskan	5th of 16	23–7–15	3,248		
2006–07	Tier 2	Playoff to Elitserien qual.	—	2–2–1–1	3,290	Round 1: Won 2–1 in games vs Växjö Lakers HC; Round 2: Won 2–1 in games vs Nyköpings HK	
2006–07	Elitserien qualifier		4th of 6	3–4–3	3,731		
2007–08	Tier 2	HockeyAllsvenskan	4th of 16	26–6–13	3,447		
2007–08	Tier 2	Playoff to Elitserien qual.	—	0–0–1–1	3,066	1st round: Lost 2–0 in games vs Borås HC	
2008–09	Tier 2	HockeyAllsvenskan	9th of 16	16–6–6–17	3,447		
2009–10	Tier 2	HockeyAllsvenskan	12th of 14	12–7–5–28	2,461	▼ Relegated to Division 1 (due to financial troubles)	
2010–11	Tier 3	Division 1A	1st of 9	20–1–2–1	2,034		
2010–11	Tier 3	AllEttan North	2nd of 8	11–0–0–3	2,115	Bye to Playoff 2	
2010–11	Tier 3	Playoff to HA qualifiers	—	1–0–1–3	2,870	Round 2: Won 2–1 in games vs Nybro Vikings IF; Round 3: Lost 2–0 in games vs Asplöven HC	
2011–12	Tier 3	Division 1A	1st of 8	19–0–1–1	2,842		
2011–12	Tier 3	AllEttan North	3rd of 8	8–1–2–3	2,698		
2011–12	Tier 3	Playoff to HA qualifier	—	3–0–0–2	2,983	Round 1: Won 2–0 in games vs Bodens HF; Round 2: Lost 2–1 in games vs Olofströms IK	
2012–13	Tier 3	Division 1A	1st of 7	22–0–1–1	2,503		
2012–13	Tier 3	AllEttan North	1st of 8	13–0–0–1	3,085	Bye to Playoff 3	
2012–13	Tier 3	Playoff to HA qualifier	—	2–0–0–0	4,369	Round 3: Won 2–0 in games vs Olofströms IK	
2012–13	HockeyAllsvenskan qualifiers		1st of 6	7–0–0–3	4,747	▲ Promoted to HockeyAllsvenskan	
2013–14	Tier 2	HockeyAllsvenskan	14th of 14	13–4–3–32	3,641		
2013–14	HockeyAllsvenskan qualifiers		2nd of 6	6–0–3–1	3,632		
2014–15	Tier 2	HockeyAllsvenskan	6th of 14	19–10–4–19	3,552		
2014–15	Tier 2	Playoff to SHL qualifiers	4th of 6	1–2–0–2	5,118		
2015–16	Tier 2	HockeyAllsvenskan	12th of 14	20–2–9–22	3,472		
2016–17	Tier 2	HockeyAllsvenskan	11th of 14	20–1–5–26	3,802		
2017–18	Tier 2	HockeyAllsvenskan	5th of 14	20–6–8–18	3,902		
2017–18	Tier 2	Playoff to SHL qualifiers	3rd of 6	2–2–0–1	4,028		
2018–19	Tier 2	HockeyAllsvenskan	10th of 14	16–6–8–22	3,879		
2019–20	Tier 2	HockeyAllsvenskan	1st of 14	36–5–3–8	4,754		
2019–20	Tier 2	HockeyAllsvenskan Finals	–	1–0–1–0	5,400	Playoffs cancelled due to the COVID-19 pandemic	
2020–21	Tier 2	HockeyAllsvenskan	3rd of 14	26–6–3–17	23		
2020–21	Tier 2	HockeyAllsvenskan Playoffs	–	6–2–3–5	56	Won in quarterfinals, 3–1 vs Mora IK; Won in semifinals, 4–3 vs BIK Karlskoga; Lost in finals, 1–4 vs Timrå IK	
2021–22	Tier 2	HockeyAllsvenskan	4th of 14	26–7–6–13	3,855		
2021–22	Tier 2	HockeyAllsvenskan Playoffs	–	8–2–2–6	5,176	Won in quarterfinals, 4–1 vs Västerås IK; Won in semifinals, 4–3 vs Modo Hockey; Lost in finals, 2–4 vs HV71	
2022–23	Tier 2	HockeyAllsvenskan	2nd of 14	29–7–5–11	4,605		
2022–23	Tier 2	HockeyAllsvenskan Playoffs	–	5–1–1–4	4,976	Won in quarterfinals, 4–1 vs Västerås IK; Lost in semifinals, 2–4 vs Djurgårdens IF	
2023–24	Tier 2	HockeyAllsvenskan	6th of 14	21–8–6–17	4,639		
2023–24	Tier 2	HockeyAllsvenskan Playoffs	–	1–0–2–2	5,001	Lost in quarterfinals, 1–4 vs Djurgårdens IF	
2024–25	Tier 2	HockeyAllsvenskan	4th of 14	28–4–6–14	4,659		
2024–25	Tier 2	HockeyAllsvenskan Playoffs	–	3–0–2–2	5,038	Lost in quarterfinals, 3–4 vs AIK	
