= List of Västerås IK seasons =

This is a list of seasons of Västerås-based Swedish ice hockey team Västerås IK, which previously has competed as VIK Hockey Ungdom and VIK Västerås HK.

Year	Level	Division	Record		Avg. home atnd.	Notes	Ref.
Year	Level	Division	Position	W-T-L W-OT-L	Avg. home atnd.	Notes	Ref.
1995–96	Tier 1	Elitserien	10th	11–11–18	3,475		
1996–97	Tier 1	Elitserien	12th	5–11–34	2,145		
1996–97	Elitserien qualifier		2nd	6–2–2			
1997–98	Tier 1	Elitserien	10th	15–9–22			
1998–99	Tier 1	Elitserien	11th	19–7–24			
1998–99	Elitserien qualifier		2nd	6–2–2			
1999–00	Tier 1	Elitserien	11th	9–6–4–31	3,006		
1999–00	Elitserien qualifier		3rd	6–0–1–3	3,574	▼ Relegated to Allsvenskan	
Västerås IK files for bankruptcy. A-team is transferred to VIK Hockey Ungdom in Division 2.							
2000–01	Tier 4	Division 2	1st	12–0–0		▲ Promoted to Division 1	
2001–02	Tier 3	Division 1	1st	13–3–2		▲ Promoted to Allsvenskan	
2002–03	Tier 2	Allsvenskan South	7th	9–6–0–13	2,083		
2002–03	Tier 2	Allsvenskan South (spring)	3rd	6–1–3–4	2,439		
2003–04	Tier 2	Allsvenskan South	4th	17–3–2–10	2,728		
2003–04	Tier 2	SuperAllsvenskan	7th	2–0–4–8	3,309		
2004–05	Tier 2	Allsvenskan North	5th of 12	18–7–7	2,462	Final season as "Västerås IK Ungdom"	
2004–05	Tier 2	Allsvenskan North Spring	2nd of 8	9–2–3	1,500		
2004–05	Tier 2	Playoff to Elitserien qualifier	—	3–2	4,668	Won in 1st round, 2–0 in games vs Rögle BK; Lost in 2nd round, 1–2 in games vs IK Nyköping	
Club renamed "VIK Västerås HK"							
2005–06	Tier 2	HockeyAllsvenskan	9th of 16	13–16–13	2,074		
2006–07	Tier 2	HockeyAllsvenskan	4th of 16	27–7–11	2,354		
2006–07	Tier 2	Playoff to Elitserien qualifier	—	0–2	3,408	Lost in 1st round, 0–2 in games vs Nyköpings HK	
2007–08	Tier 2	HockeyAllsvenskan	5th of 16	24–7–14	2,467		
2007–08	Tier 2	Playoff to Elitserien qualifier	—	4–1	3,576	Won in 1st round, 2–1 in games vs Växjö Lakers HC; Won in 2nd round, 2–0 in games vs Borås HC	
2007–08	Elitserien qualifier		6th of 6	1–0–9	3,875		
2008–09	Tier 2	HockeyAllsvenskan	3rd of 16	24–2–6–13	2,573		
2008–09	Elitserien qualifier		6th of 6	2–1–1–6	3,605		
2009–10	Tier 2	HockeyAllsvenskan	8th of 14	21–3–5–23	2,129		
2010–11	Tier 2	HockeyAllsvenskan	5th of 14	26–2–7–17	2,404		
2010–11	Tier 2	Promotion pre-qualifier	2nd	2–1–1–2	2,310		
2011–12	Tier 2	HockeyAllsvenskan	4th of 14	29–1–6–16	2,665		
2011–12	Tier 2	Promotion pre-qualifier	4th	1–0–1–4	1,547		
2012–13	Tier 2	HockeyAllsvenskan	3rd of 14	28–5–4–15	3,326		
2012–13	Elitserien qualifier		4th of 6	3–1–1–5	3,918		
2013–14	Tier 2	HockeyAllsvenskan	2nd of 14	26–9–4–13	3,170		
2013–14	Elitserien qualifier		6th of 6	2–1–1–6	4,032		
2014–15	Tier 2	HockeyAllsvenskan	1st of 14	28–4–6–14	3,578		
2014–15	Tier 2	HockeyAllsvenskan finals	—	1–0–1–2	4,833	Lost 3–1 in games to Karlskrona HK	
2014–15	SHL qualifiers		—	1–0–0–4	4,108	Lost 4–1 in games to Rögle BK	
2015–16	Tier 2	HockeyAllsvenskan	9th of 14	20–3–9–20	3,346		
2016–17	Tier 2	HockeyAllsvenskan	13th of 14	13–4–3–32	2,860		
2016–17	HockeyAllsvenskan qualifiers		TBD	TBD	TBD		
