= List of Linköping HC seasons =

This is a list of seasons of Linköping-based Swedish ice hockey club Linköping HC.

Season	Level	Division	Record		Avg. home atnd.	Notes
Season	Level	Division	Position	W-T-L W-OT-L	Avg. home atnd.	Notes
1999–00	Tier 1	Elitserien	12th	9–6–35	3,860	
1999–00	2000 Elitserien qualifier		4th	3–2–5	3,174	▼ Relegated to Allsvenskan
2000–01	Tier 2	Allsvenskan South	1st	22–3–3	2,642	
2000–01	Tier 2	SuperAllsvenskan	2nd	6–4–4	3,593	
2000–01	2001 Elitserien qualifier		2nd	6–2–2	3,955	▲ Promoted to Elitserien
2001–02	Tier 1	Elitserien	10th	14–11–25	4,349	
2002–03	Tier 1	Elitserien	12th	10–9–31	4,083	
2002–03	2003 Elitserien qualifier		1st	7–2–1	4,199	
2003–04	Tier 1	2003–04	4th	25–8–17	4,247	
2003–04	Swedish Championship playoffs		—	1–4	4,525	Lost in quarterfinals, 1–4 vs Timrå
2004–05	Tier 1	Elitserien	2nd	30–5–15	7,703	
2004–05	Swedish Championship playoffs		—	2–4	8,410	Lost in quarterfinals, 2–4 vs Södertälje
2005–06	Tier 1	Elitserien	3rd	25–14–11	7,531	
2005–06	Swedish Championship playoffs		—	7–6	8,066	Won in quarterfinals, 4–2 vs Luleå; Lost in semifinals, 3–4 vs Frölunda
2006–07	Tier 1	Elitserien	4th	22–14–19	7,266	
2006–07	Swedish Championship playoffs		—	10–5	8,284	Won in quarterfinals, 4–0 vs Luleå; Won in semifinals, 4–1 vs Färjestad; (silver) Lost in finals, 2–4 vs MODO
2007–08	Tier 1	Elitserien	2nd	21–20–14	7,182	
2007–08	Swedish Championship playoffs		—	10–6	7,962	Won in quarterfinals, 4–1 vs Djurgården; Won in semifinals, 4–1 vs Färjestad; (silver) Lost in finals, 2–4 vs HV 71
2008–09	Tier 1	Elitserien	2nd	26–13–16	7,467	
2008–09	Swedish Championship playoffs		—	3–4	7,526	Lost in quarterfinals, 3–4 vs Skellefteå
2009–10	Tier 1	Elitserien	3rd	27–8–20	6,899	
2009–10	Swedish Championship playoffs		—	5–7	7,856	Won in quarterfinals, 4–3 vs Frölunda; Lost in semifinals, 1–4 vs Djurgården
2010–11	Tier 1	Elitserien	5th	22–14–19	6,676	
2010–11	Swedish Championship playoffs		—	3–4	7,315	Lost in quarterfinals, 3–4 vs Skellefteå
2011–12	Tier 1	Elitserien	10th	17–14–24	6,903	
2012–13	Tier 1	Elitserien	5th	27–9–19	6,287	
2012–13	Swedish Championship playoffs		—	5–5	8,364	Won in quarterfinals, 4–1 vs HV 71; Lost in semifinals, 1–4 vs Skellefteå
2013–14	Tier 1	SHL	9th	20–11–24	6,697	
2013–14	Swedish Championship playoffs		—	5–7	7,138	Won in quarterfinals, 4–3 vs Frölunda; Lost in semifinals, 1–4 vs Skellefteå
2014–15	Tier 1	SHL	4th	26–11–18	5,850	
2014–15	Swedish Championship playoffs		—	5–6	7,417	Won in quarterfinals, 4–2 vs HV71; Lost in semifinals, 1–4 vs Skellefteå
2015–16	Tier 1	SHL	3rd	23–16–13	6,125	
2015–16	Swedish Championship playoffs		—	2–4	7,076	Lost in quarterfinals, 2–4 vs Växjö
2016–17	Tier 1	SHL	4th	27–10–15	5,701	
2016–17	Swedish Championship playoffs		—	2–4		Lost in quarterfinals, 2–4 vs Brynäs
2017–18	Tier 1	SHL	9th	21–12–19	5,688	
2017–18	Swedish Championship playoffs		—	3–4		Won in Wild Card, 2–0 vs HV71; Lost in quarterfinals, 1–4 vs Djurgården
2018–19	Tier 1	SHL	12th	15–14–23	6,079	
2019–20	Tier 1	SHL	11th	14–17–21	6,306	
2020–21	Tier 1	SHL	12th	17–7–28	0	
2021–22	Tier 1	SHL	11th	16–13–23	4,987	
2022–23	Tier 1	SHL	12th	20–11–21	6,045	
2023–24	Tier 1	SHL	6th	23–12–17	6,724	
2023–24	Swedish Championship playoffs		—	0–4	8,190	Lost in quarterfinals, 0–4 vs Skellefteå
2024–25	Tier 1	SHL	12th	15–16–21	7,103	
