= List of Luleå HF seasons =

This is a list of Swedish ice hockey club Luleå HF's seasons.

Season	Level	Division	Record		Avg. home atnd.	Notes	Ref.
Season	Level	Division	Position	W-T-L W-OT-L	Avg. home atnd.	Notes	Ref.
1979–80	Tier 2	Division 1 – Northern group	3rd	20–1–6			
1979–80	Division 1 playoffs North/East		—	4–1		Won in First Round, 2–0 vs Örebro IK; Won in Second Round, 2–1 vs Kiruna AIF	
1979–80	Kvalserien		5th	0–3			
1980–81	Tier 2	Division 1 – Northern group	2nd	21–4–2			
1980–81	Division 1 playoffs		—	3–3		Won in Second round, 2–1 vs Västerås IK; Lost in Third round, 1–2 vs HV71	
1981–82	Tier 2	Division 1 – Northern group	1st	21–1–5			
1981–82	Division 1 playoffs		—	2–3		Won in Second round, 2–1 vs Huddinge IK; Lost in Third round, 0–2 vs HV71	
1982–83	Tier 2	Division 1 – Northern group First round	2nd	15–0–3			
1982–83	Tier 2	Allsvenskan	2nd	8–2–5			
1982–83	Allsvenskan Final		—	0–3		Lost in Final, 0–3 vs Södertälje SK	
1982–83	Kvalserien		2nd	3–2–1			
1983–84	Tier 2	Division 1 – Northern group First round	1st	15–1–2			
1983–84	Tier 2	Allsvenskan	1st	11–1–2			
1983–84	Allsvenskan Final		—	3–0		(gold) Won in Final, 3–0 vs Hammarby IF	
1984–85	Tier 1	Elitserien	5th	16–5–15			
1985–86	Tier 1	Elitserien	6th	15–5–16			
1986–87	Tier 1	Elitserien	3rd	17–7–12			
1986–87	Swedish Championship playoffs		—	1–2		Lost in semi-finals, 1–2 vs Färjestad BK	
1987–88	Tier 1	Elitserien – First round	7th	10–1–11			
1987–88	Tier 1	Final round	10th	17–4–19			
1988–89	Tier 1	Elitserien – First round	5th	12–1–9			
1988–89	Tier 1	Final round	4th	20–3–17			
1988–89	Swedish Championship playoffs		—	1–2		Lost in quarterfinals, 1–2 vs Brynäs IF	
1989–90	Tier 1	Elitserien – First round	5th	11–2–9			
1989–90	Tier 1	Final round	3rd	21–2–17			
1989–90	Swedish Championship playoffs		—	2–3		Won in quarterfinals, 2–1 vs Leksands IF; Lost in semi-finals, 0–2 vs Djurgårdens IF	
1990–91	Tier 1	Elitserien – First round	3rd	12–1–9			
1990–91	Tier 1	Final round	3rd	23–1–16			
1990–91	Swedish Championship playoffs		—	3–2		Won in quarterfinals, 2–0 vs Malmö IF; Lost in semi-finals, 1–2 vs Färjestad BK	
1991–92	Tier 1	Elitserien – First round	4th	9–7–6			
1991–92	Tier 1	Final round	4th	17–13–10			
1991–92	Swedish Championship playoffs		—	0–2		Lost in quarterfinals, 0–2 vs Djurgårdens IF	
1992–93	Tier 1	Elitserien – First round	7th	9–2–11			
1992–93	Tier 1	Final round	6th	16–7–17			
1992–93	Swedish Championship playoffs		—	6–5		Won in quarterfinals, 2–1 vs Färjestad BK; Won in semi-finals, 2–1 vs Djurgårdens IF; (silver) Lost in finals, 2–3 vs Brynäs IF	
1993–94	Tier 1	Elitserien – First round	9th	8–5–9			
1993–94	Tier 1	Final round	10th	12–6–22			
1994–95	Tier 1	Elitserien – First round	4th	11–5–6			
1994–95	Tier 1	Final round	3rd	21–10–9			
1994–95	Swedish Championship playoffs		—	5–4		Won in quarterfinals, 3–1 vs Färjestad BK; Lost in semi-finals, 2–3 vs Brynäs IF	
1995–96	Tier 1	Elitserien – First round	1st	15–1–6			
1995–96	Tier 1	Final round	1st	22–6–12			
1995–96	Swedish Championship playoffs		—	9–4		Won in quarterfinals, 3–2 vs Malmö IF; Won in semi-finals, 3–1 vs MODO Hockey; (gold) Won in finals, 3–1 vs Västra Frölunda	
1996–97	Tier 1	Elitserien	2nd	26–8–16			
1996–97	Swedish Championship playoffs		—	7–3		Won in quarterfinals, 3–0 vs Västra Frölunda; Won in semi-finals, 3–0 vs AIK; (silver) Lost in finals, 1–3 vs Färjestad BK	
1997–98	Tier 1	Elitserien	8th	15–13–18			
1997–98	Swedish Championship playoffs		—	0–3		Lost in quarterfinals, 0–3 vs Färjestad BK	
1998–99	Tier 1	Elitserien	6th	22–8–20			
1998–99	Swedish Championship playoffs		—	5–4		Won in quarterfinals, 3–1 vs Leksands IF; Lost in semi-finals, 2–3 vs Brynäs IF	
1999–00	Tier 1	Elitserien	4th	25–6–2–17	4,070		
1999–00	Swedish Championship playoffs		—	4–5	5,077	Won in quarterfinals, 4–2 vs Malmö IF; Lost in semi-finals, 0–3 vs Djurgårdens IF	
2000–01	Tier 1	Elitserien	6th	21–5–3–21	4,289		
2000–01	Swedish Championship playoffs		—	5–7	4,999	Won in quarterfinals, 4–3 vs MODO Hockey; Lost in semi-finals, 1–4 vs Djurgårdens IF	
2001–02	Tier 1	Elitserien	7th	15–10–4–21	4,118		
2001–02	Swedish Championship playoffs		—	0–4	4,562	Lost in quarterfinals, 0–4 vs MODO Hockey	
2002–03	Tier 1	Elitserien	5th	21–4–8–17	4,752		
2002–03	Swedish Championship playoffs		—	0–4	5,340	Lost in quarterfinals, 0–4 vs Timrå IK	
2003–04	Tier 1	Elitserien	7th	19–5–3–23	4,657		
2003–04	Swedish Championship playoffs		—	1–4	5,277	Lost in quarterfinals, 1–4 vs Färjestad BK	
2004–05	Tier 1	Elitserien	7th	19–6–25	5,134		
2004–05	Swedish Championship playoffs		—	0–4	5,198	Lost in quarterfinals, 0–4 vs Frölunda HC	
2005–06	Tier 1	Elitserien	5th	22–12–16	4,982		
2005–06	Swedish Championship playoffs		—	2–4	5,162	Lost in quarterfinals, 2–4 vs Linköpings HC	
2006–07	Tier 1	Elitserien	7th	21–11–23	4,631		
2006–07	Swedish Championship playoffs		—	0–4	4,682	Lost in quarterfinals, 0–4 vs Linköpings HC	
2007–08	Tier 1	Elitserien	10th	17–13–25	4,555		
2008–09	Tier 1	Elitserien	5th	26–9–20	4,943		
2008–09	Swedish Championship playoffs		—	1–4	5,351	Lost in quarterfinals, 1–4 vs Frölunda HC	
2009–10	Tier 1	Elitserien	10th	19–13–23	5,332		
2010–11	Tier 1	Elitserien	4th	23–8–3–21	5,226		
2010–11	Swedish Championship playoffs		—	2–4–2–5	5,939	Won in quarterfinals, 4–3 vs Djurgårdens IF; Lost in semi-finals, 2–4 vs Skellefteå AIK	
2011–12	Tier 1	Elitserien	1st	25–8–9–13	5,154		
2011–12	Swedish Championship playoffs		—	1–0–0–4	5,464	Lost in quarterfinals, 1–4 vs AIK	
2012–13	Tier 1	Elitserien	3rd	25–9–9–12	5,184		
2012–13	Swedish Championship playoffs		—	6–2–2–5	5,898	Won in quarterfinals, 4–2 vs Frölunda HC; Won in semi-finals, 4–1 vs Färjestads BK; (silver) Lost in finals, 0–4 vs Skellefteå AIK	
2013–14	Tier 1	SHL	6th	22–6–6–21	5,090		
2013–14	Swedish Championship playoffs		—	1–1–0–4	5,619	Lost in quarterfinals, 2–4 vs Växjö Lakers	
2014–15	Tier 1	SHL	8th	21–6–4–24	5,021		
2014–15	"Play In"		—	2–0–0–0	5,296	Won 2–0 vs Djurgårdens IF	
2014–15	Swedish Championship playoffs		—	3–0–2–2	5,506	Lost in quarterfinals, 3–4 vs Frölunda HC	
2014–15	CHL		—	10–0–1–1–2	3,753	Won in eighth finals on aggregate 10–9 (SO) vs Red Bull Salzburg; Won in quarterfinals on aggregate 7–3 vs Lukko; Won in semi-finals on aggregate 5–4 vs Skellefteå AIK; (gold) Won in Final, 4–2 vs Frölunda HC	
2015–16	Tier 1	SHL	4th	26–5–4–17	5,354		
2015–16	Swedish Championship playoffs		—	5–1–1–4	5,811	Won in quarterfinals 4–1 vs Färjestad BK; Lost in semi-finals 2–4 vs Frölunda HC	
2015–16	CHL		—	5–1–0–4	3,949	Won in round of 32 on aggregate 4–3 vs Färjestad BK; Won in round of 16 on aggregate 6–2 vs Tappara; Lost in semi-finals on aggregate 7–8 (SO) vs Frölunda HC	
2016–17	Tier 1	SHL	9th	16–7–8–21	4,896		
2016–17	Swedish Championship playoffs		—	0–0–0–2	4,459	Lost in eighth finals 0–2 vs Malmö Redhawks	
2016–17	CHL		—	0–0–1–3	2,745	Did not advance to playoffs	
2017–18	Tier 1	SHL	7th	19–10–4–19	4,946		
2017–18	Swedish Championship playoffs		—	1–0–0–2	4,972	Lost in eighth finals 1–2 vs Brynäs IF	
2018–19	Tier 1	SHL	2nd	25–11–4–12	5,363		
2018–19	Swedish Championship playoffs		—	4–1–2–3	6,126	Won in quarterfinals 4–1 vs Växjö Lakers; Lost in semi-finals 1–4 vs Frölunda HC	
2019–20	Tier 1	SHL	1st	30–6–4–12	5,325	Playoffs cancelled due to COVID-19 pandemic	
2020–21	Tier 1	SHL	5th	24–4–8–16	550		
2020–21	Swedish Championship playoffs		—	3–0–1–3	0	Lost in quarterfinals 3–4 vs Skellefteå AIK	
2021–22	Tier 1	SHL	2nd	25–7–8–12	4,684		
2021–22	Swedish Championship playoffs		—	9–2–2–4	6,150	Won in quarterfinals 4–1 vs Örebro HK; Won in semi-finals 4–1 vs Frölunda HC; (silver) Lost in finals 3–4 vs Färjestad BK	
2022–23	Tier 1	SHL	10th	18–4–9–21	6,000		
2022–23	Eighth-finals		—	2–1	5,868	Won 2–1 vs IK Oskarshamn	
2022–23	Swedish Championship playoffs		—	3–0–1–3	6,080	Lost in quarterfinals 3–4 vs Växjö Lakers	
2023–24	Tier 1	SHL	7th	21–7–3–21	6,724		
2023–24	Eighth-finals		—	2–1	6,150	Won 2–1 vs Örebro HK	
2023–24	Swedish Championship playoffs		—	0–0–1–3	6,150	Lost in quarterfinals 0–4 vs Växjö Lakers	
2024–25	Tier 1	SHL	2nd	22–11–4–15	7,103		
2024–25	Swedish Championship playoffs		—	10–2–2–3	6,150	Won in quarterfinals 4–1 vs Växjö Lakers; Won in semifinals 4–2 vs Frölunda HC; Won in finals 4–2 vs Brynäs IF; (gold) 2025 Swedish Champions (2nd title)	
