= Janne Karlsson (ice hockey, born 1964) =

Swedish ice hockey player and coach

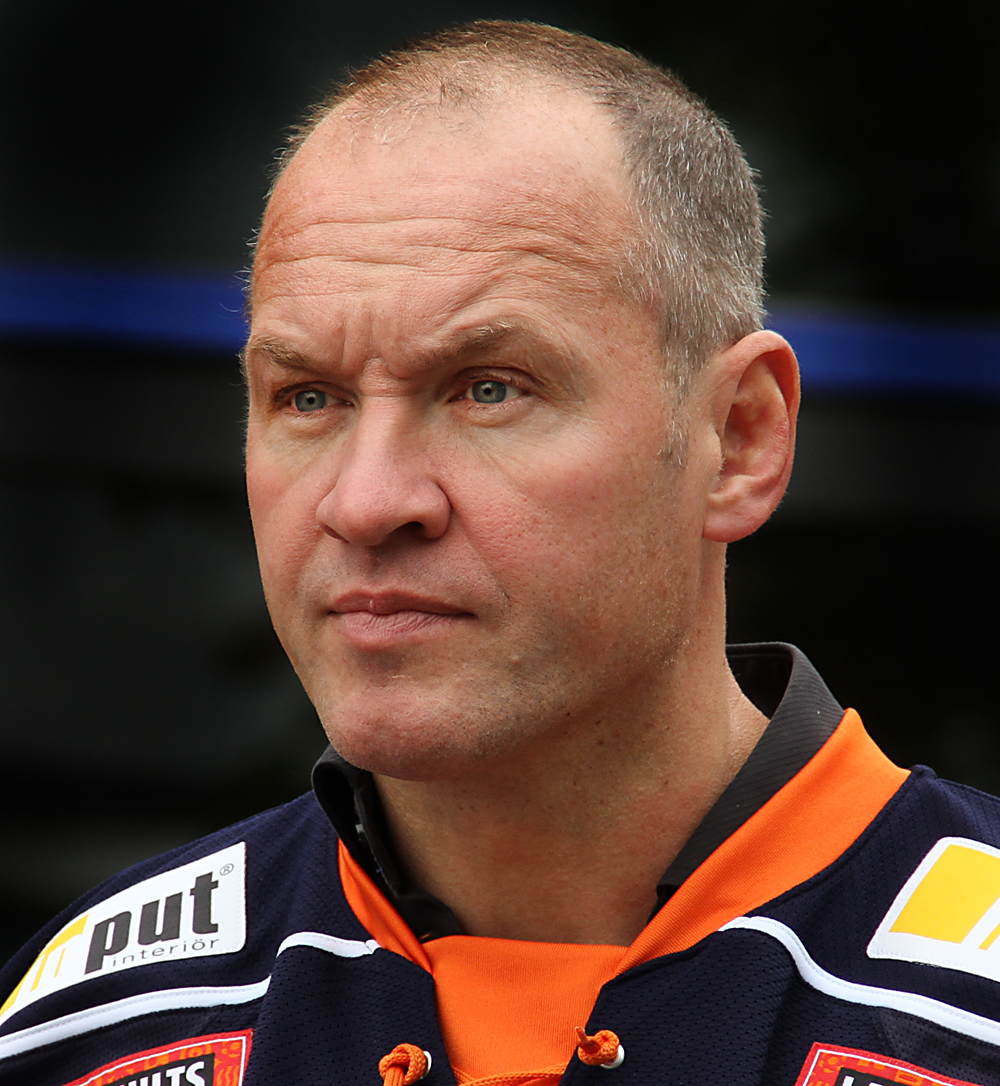
- Janne Karlsson in September 2011
- Born: 30 May 1964 (age 62) Kiruna, Sweden
- Height: 6 ft 2 in (188 cm)
- Weight: 198 lb (90 kg; 14 st 2 lb)
- Position: Defenceman
- Played for: Modo Hockey; VIK Västerås HK
- NHL draft: 162nd overall, 1982; New York Rangers
- Playing career: 1982–1996

Jan "Janne" Peter Karlsson (born 30 May 1964) is a Swedish former professional ice hockey player defenceman and general manager, currently the head coach of the Karlskrona HK.

== Playing career ==
Karlsson was born in Kiruna and therefore has Kiruna AIF as his youth team. In the 1982 NHL entry draft, Karlsson was drafted in the 8th round, 162nd overall, by the New York Rangers. He left Kiruna AIF after the 1980–81 season, playing nine games with the team in the then second-tier league Division 1.

The following season Karlsson played in Sweden's national under-18 team in the 1982 IIHF European U18 Championship, scoring two points in five games and winning a gold medal. Karlsson also played in Sweden's national under-20 team in the 1983 respectively 1984 World Junior Ice Hockey Championships. In the 1982–83 season, Karlsson was given the chance to play in Modo Hockey of the Elitserien, Sweden's top ice hockey league. During his first two seasons with the team he did not manage to score any goals, and in the 1983–84 season the team was relegated to Division 1. However, Karlsson and Modo were quickly promoted back to Elitserien the following season.

After the 1985–86 season Karlsson left Modo to play in VIK Västerås HK, who at that time played in the Division 1. In his first season with the team, the 1987–88 season, the team was promoted to Elitserien for the first time in the club's history. Karlsson continued on to play for the team for another four seasons before finishing his player career in the Division 1 team Huddinge IK in the 1995–96 season.

== Post-career ==
In 2003, seven years after his retirement, Karlsson was named the head coach of IF Björklöven, who at that time played in HockeyAllsvenskan. He coached the team for two seasons: in the 2003–04 season the team was forced to play in the Spring series but managed to stay in HockeyAllsvenskan, but in the 2004–05 season the team managed to reach the former SuperAllsvenskan but failed to reach the playoffs for a chance to play in the Kvalserien qualification for Elitserien. The following season Karlsson was named the general manager of IF Björklöven, but he left the club mid-way through the 2006–07 season and instead signed as the head coach for the Division 1 team Mörrums IK.

Prior to the 2007–08 season Karlsson was named the head coach of the Växjö Lakers Hockey, who at that time played in HockeyAllsvenskan. Janne Karlsson managed to coach his team to a playoff spot in his first season with the team, but the team was quickly eliminated by VIK Västerås HK in three games. Then, in 2009, 2010 and 2011 he managed to coach his team to the Kvalserien qualification for Elitserien. The team was not lucky in the first two Kvalserien qualifications, but in the 2011 Kvalserien qualification he successfully coached his team to a spot in the Elitserien.
