= 1999 Kvalserien =

25th edition of Kvalserien

The 1999 Kvalserien was the 25th edition of the Kvalserien. It determined two teams of the participating ones would play in the 1999–2000 Elitserien season and which four teams would play in the 1999–2000 Allsvenskan season.

== Tournament ==
	Club	GP	W	T	L	GF	GA	Pts
1.	Linköpings HC	10	7	2	1	39	18	16
2.	Västerås IK	10	6	2	2	36	23	14
3.	Mora IK	10	4	3	3	33	26	11
4.	Södertälje SK	10	3	3	4	16	23	9
5.	IF Troja-Ljungby	10	2	1	7	20	28	5
6.	IF Björklöven	10	2	1	7	19	45	5
