= 1982 Kvalserien =

Swedish ice hockey tournament

The 1982 Kvalserien was the eighth edition of the Kvalserien. It determined which two teams of the participating ones would play in the 1982–83 Elitserien season and which two teams would play in the 1982–83 Swedish Division 1 season.

== Tournament ==
	Club	GP	W	T	L	GF	GA	Pts
1.	Hammarby IF	6	4	0	2	25	14	8
2.	Djurgårdens IF	6	3	1	2	24	18	7
3.	Södertälje SK	6	3	0	3	18	23	6
4.	HV71	6	1	1	4	14	26	3
