= 1979 Kvalserien =

Swedish ice hockey tournament

The 1979 Kvalserien was the fifth edition of the Kvalserien. It determined which two teams of the participating ones would play in the 1979–80 Elitserien season and which three teams would play in the 1979–80 Swedish Division 1 season.

== Tournament ==
	Club	GP	W	T	L	GF	GA	Pts
1.	IF Björklöven	4	3	1	0	25	12	7
2.	HV71	4	2	1	1	24	16	5
3.	Södertälje SK	4	1	3	0	12	10	5
4.	Huddinge IK	4	1	1	2	11	23	3
5.	Bofors IK	4	0	0	4	16	27	0
