= 1975 Kvalserien =

Swedish ice hockey tournament

The 1975 Kvalserien was the first edition of the Kvalserien. It determined which two teams of the participating ones would play in the 1975–76 Elitserien season and which six teams would play in the 1975–76 Swedish Division 1 season.

== Tournament ==
=== Northeastern Group ===
	Club	GP	W	T	L	GF	GA	Pts
1.	Djurgårdens IF	6	5	0	1	39	16	10
2.	Hammarby IF	6	3	0	3	26	22	6
3.	Hofors IK	6	2	0	4	16	29	4
4.	IFK Kiruna	6	2	0	4	24	38	4

=== Southwestern Group ===
	Club	GP	W	T	L	GF	GA	Pts
1.	Södertälje SK	6	5	1	0	47	20	11
2.	HV71	6	3	1	2	28	27	7
3.	BK Bäcken	5	1	2	2	14	32	4
4.	Fagersta AIK	5	0	0	5	11	31	0
