= Kvalserien =

Swedish round-robin ice hockey tournament

- Sport: Ice hockey
- Founded: 1975
- Folded: 2014
- No. of teams: 6
- Country: Sweden
- Promotion to: SHL
- Relegation to: HockeyAllsvenskan

Kvalserien, also known as Kvalserien till SHL, was the Swedish round-robin ice hockey tournament to qualify for play in the next season of the Swedish Hockey League (SHL, previously named Elitserien), Sweden's top-level ice hockey league for men. It was replaced by a playoff round in the 2014–15 season.

== Teams ==
Kvalserien was formed after the regular seasons of the Swedish Hockey League (SHL, previously named Elitserien) and the second-tier league HockeyAllsvenskan had been played. The two worst ranked teams in the SHL and the best four teams in HockeyAllsvenskan formed the league together with the winner of a six-round round-robin tournament between the teams ranked 4–7 from HockeyAllsvenskan. The six Kvalserien teams played each other twice, once at home ice and once on the road, giving 10 games per team and a total of 30 games. The two teams finishing first and second were promoted to the SHL the next season, while the remaining four teams played in HockeyAllsvenskan the next season.

== Winners ==
- 1975 - Djurgårdens IF, Södertälje SK
- 1976 - IF Björklöven, Örebro IK
- 1977 - Djurgårdens IF, Timrå IK
- 1978 - Örebro IK, IF Björklöven
- 1979 - IF Björklöven, HV71
- 1980 - Skellefteå AIK, Södertälje SK
- 1981 - Leksands IF, Timrå IK
- 1982 - Hammarby IF, Djurgårdens IF
- 1983 - Modo AIK
- 1984 - Hammarby IF
- 1985 - HV71
- 1986 - Modo AIK
- 1987 - Modo AIK, Väsby IK
- 1988 - IK VIK Hockey
- 1989 - Västra Frölunda HC
- 1990 - Modo Hockey
- 1991 - Västra Frölunda HC
- 1992 - Leksands IF
- 1993 - IF Björklöven
- 1994 - AIK
- 1995 - Rögle BK
- 1996 - Brynäs IF
- 1997 - Södertälje SK, VIK Västerås HK
- 1998 - AIK, IF Björklöven
- 1999 - Linköpings HC, VIK Västerås HK
- 2000 - Timrå IK, IF Björklöven
- 2001 - Södertälje SK, Linköpings HC
- 2002 - Timrå IK, Leksands IF
- 2003 - Linköpings HC, Brynäs IF
- 2004 - MIF Redhawks, Mora IK
- 2005 - Leksands IF, Brynäs IF
- 2006 - IF Malmö Redhawks, Skellefteå AIK
- 2007 - Skellefteå AIK, Södertälje SK
- 2008 - Brynäs IF, Rögle BK
- 2009 - Södertälje SK, Rögle BK
- 2010 - Södertälje SK, AIK
- 2011 - Växjö Lakers, Modo Hockey
- 2012 - Timrå IK, Rögle BK
- 2013 - Örebro HK, Leksands IF
- 2014 - Örebro HK, Djurgårdens IF

== Previous seasons ==
=== 2000 season ===
IF Björklöven and Timrå IK returned to Elitserien after respectively one and eighteen seasons in lesser divisions. VIK Västerås HK and Linköpings HC were relegated to HockeyAllsvenskan.

=== 2001 season ===
Linköpings HC and Södertälje SK returned to Elitserien after one and three seasons, respectively, in lesser divisions. Leksands IF and IF Björklöven were relegated to HockeyAllsvenskan.

=== 2002 season ===
Timrå IK re-qualified for Elitserien and Leksands IF returned to Elitserien after one year in lesser divisions. AIK were relegated to HockeyAllsvenskan.

=== 2003 season ===
Both Linköpings HC and Brynäs IF re-qualified for Elitserien.

=== 2004 season ===
Malmö Redhawks re-qualified for Elitserien and Mora IK qualified for Elitserien for the first time in club history. Leksands IF were relegated to HockeyAllsvenskan.

=== 2005 season ===
Brynäs IF re-qualified for Elitserien and Leksands IF returned to Elitserien after one year in lesser divisions. Malmö Redhawks were relegated to HockeyAllsvenskan.

=== 2006 season ===
Malmö Redhawks and Skellefteå AIK respectively finished first and second and qualified for play in Elitserien in the 2006–07 season. Södertälje SK and Leksands IF were relegated from Elitserien and were forced to spend the 2006-07 season in HockeyAllsvenskan.

=== 2007 season ===
Skellefteå AIK re-qualified for Elitserien and Södertälje SK returned to Elitserien after one year in lesser divisions.

=== 2008 season ===
Brynäs IF remained in the highest league and Rögle BK were promoted to Elitserien at the expense of Mora IK.

=== 2009 season ===
Södertälje SK and Rögle BK ended up respectively second and first and both re-qualified for Elitserien for the 2009–10 season.

=== 2010 season ===
Södertälje SK finished first in Kvalserien for the second consecutive year, and AIK returned to Elitserien after eight seasons in lesser divisions.

=== 2011 season ===
Växjö Lakers, HockeyAllsvenskan's regular-season winners, finished with 26 points and qualified for Elitserien for the first time in club history, at the expense of Södertälje SK. Modo Hockey re-qualified for Elitserien.

=== 2012 season ===
Timrå IK defended their Elitserien spot, while Rögle BK returned to Elitserien after two years and replaced Djurgårdens IF who were relegated to the second-tier league, HockeyAllsvenskan, for the first time since the 1977–78 season. Rögle became the first HockeyAllsvenskan team in history to qualify for Elitserien by winning the playoff round to get into the Kvalserien.

=== 2013 season ===
For the first time since 2006, neither of the two Elitserien teams, Timrå IK and Rögle BK, managed to defend their Elitserien/SHL spot. Instead, HockeyAllsvenskan teams Örebro HK (who qualified through a Playoff round-robin tournament) and regular-season winner Leksands IF took the two available spots for the 2013–14 SHL season. Örebro promoted to the SHL for the first time in club history, while Leksand returned to the SHL for the first time since 2005–06. Timrå were relegated to HockeyAllsvenskan for the first time since 1999–2000, while Rögle's return to Elitserien lasted for only one season.

=== 2014 season ===
The 40th and final Kvalserien ended with Örebro HK defending their SHL spot and Djurgårdens IF returning to the top-tier league after a two-year stint in HockeyAllsvenskan. AIK were relegated to HockeyAllsvenskan.
