= 1991 Kvalserien =

Swedish ice hockey tournament

The 1991 Kvalserien was the 17th edition of the Kvalserien. It determined which team of the participating ones would play in the 1991–92 Elitserien season and which three teams would play in the 1991–92 Swedish Division 1 season.

== Tournament ==
	Club	GP	W	T	L	GF	GA	Pts
1.	Västra Frölunda HC	6	5	0	1	32	18	10
2.	Boro HC	6	3	1	2	24	25	7
3.	Rögle BK	6	2	1	3	24	24	5
4.	Mölndals IF	6	1	0	5	23	36	2
