= Daniel Norbe =

Swedish ice hockey player

- Born: August 22, 1995 (age 30) Växjö, Sweden
- Height: 5 ft 11 in (180 cm)
- Weight: 194 lb (88 kg; 13 st 12 lb)
- Position: Defence
- Shoots: Left
- Allsv team Former teams: Södertälje SK; HV71
- Playing career: 2014–present

Daniel Norbe (born August 22, 1995) is a Swedish professional ice hockey defenceman. He is currently playing with Södertälje SK of the Hockeyallsvenskan (Allsv).

Norbe made his Swedish Hockey League (SHL) debut playing with HV71 during the 2014–15 SHL season.
