= 1976 Kvalserien =

Swedish ice hockey tournament

The 1976 Kvalserien was the second edition of the Kvalserien. It determined which two teams of the participating ones would play in the 1976–77 Elitserien season and which two teams would play in the 1976–77 Swedish Division 1 season.

== Tournament ==
	Club	GP	W	T	L	GF	GA	Pts
1.	IF Björklöven	6	4	1	1	33	21	9
2.	Örebro IK	6	4	0	2	41	29	8
3.	Mora IK	6	3	1	2	32	28	7
4.	Nacka SK	6	0	0	6	11	39	0
