= 1998 Kvalserien =

Swedish ice hockey tournament

The 1998 Kvalserien was the 24th edition of the Kvalserien. It determined two teams of the participating ones would play in the 1998–99 Elitserien season and which four teams would play in the 1998–99 Swedish Division 1 season.

== Tournament ==
| | Club | GP | W | T | L | GF | GA | Pts |
|---|---|---|---|---|---|---|---|---|
| 1. | AIK | 10 | 8 | 0 | 2 | 33 | 18 | 16 |
| 2. | IF Björklöven | 10 | 6 | 0 | 4 | 43 | 35 | 12 |
| 3. | Södertälje SK | 10 | 5 | 1 | 4 | 29 | 24 | 11 |
| 4. | Linköpings HC | 10 | 4 | 2 | 4 | 33 | 33 | 10 |
| 5. | Timrå IK | 10 | 3 | 1 | 6 | 26 | 31 | 7 |
| 6. | IF Troja-Ljungby | 10 | 2 | 0 | 8 | 27 | 50 | 4 |
