= 1995 Kvalserien =

Swedish ice hockey tournament

The 1995 Kvalserien was the 21st edition of the Kvalserien. It determined which team of the participating ones would play in the 1995–96 Elitserien season and which three teams would play in the 1995–96 Swedish Division 1 season.

== Tournament ==
	Club	GP	W	T	L	GF	GA	Pts
1.	Rögle BK	6	4	1	1	34	19	8
2.	Bodens IK	6	3	1	2	22	25	8
3.	IF Troja-Ljungby	6	2	2	2	23	23	5
4.	IK Vita Hästen	6	0	2	4	18	30	3
