= 1981 Kvalserien =

Swedish ice hockey tournament

The 1981 Kvalserien was the seventh edition of the Kvalserien. It determined which two teams of the participating ones would play in the 1981–82 Elitserien season and which two teams would play in the 1981–82 Swedish Division 1 season.

== Tournament ==
	Club	GP	W	T	L	GF	GA	Pts
1.	Leksands IF	6	4	1	1	32	22	9
2.	Timrå IK	6	3	0	3	20	16	6
3.	Hammarby IF	6	2	1	3	20	20	5
4.	HV71	6	2	0	4	20	34	4
