= 1986 Kvalserien =

Swedish ice hockey tournament

The 1986 Kvalserien was the 12th edition of the Kvalserien. It determined which team of the participating ones would play in the 1986–87 Elitserien season and which three teams would play in the 1986–87 Swedish Division 1 season.

== Tournament ==
	Club	GP	W	T	L	GF	GA	Pts
1.	MoDo AIK	6	4	1	1	29	20	9
2.	Västerås IK	6	2	1	3	25	24	5
3.	Hammarby IF	6	1	3	2	23	27	5
4.	Huddinge IK	6	2	1	3	16	22	5
