= 1987 Kvalserien =

Swedish ice hockey tournament

The 1987 Kvalserien was the 13th edition of the Kvalserien. It determined which two teams of the participating ones would play in the 1987–88 Elitserien season and which two teams would play in the 1987–88 Swedish Division 1 season.

== Tournament ==
| | Club | GP | W | T | L | GF | GA | Pts |
|---|---|---|---|---|---|---|---|---|
| 1. | MoDo AIK | 6 | 5 | 1 | 0 | 31 | 15 | 9 |
| 2. | Väsby IK | 6 | 3 | 0 | 3 | 21 | 26 | 5 |
| 3. | Västerås IK | 6 | 2 | 1 | 3 | 19 | 24 | 5 |
| 4. | Örebro IK | 6 | 1 | 0 | 5 | 21 | 27 | 5 |
