= 1984 Kvalserien =

Swedish ice hockey tournament

The 1984 Kvalserien was the tenth edition of the Kvalserien. It determined which team of the participating ones would play in the 1984–85 Elitserien season and which three teams would play in the 1984–85 Swedish Division 1 season.

== Tournament ==
| | Club | GP | W | T | L | GF | GA | Pts |
|---|---|---|---|---|---|---|---|---|
| 1. | Hammarby IF | 6 | 4 | 1 | 1 | 31 | 22 | 9 |
| 2. | MoDo AIK | 6 | 4 | 0 | 2 | 30 | 21 | 8 |
| 3. | Västerås IK | 6 | 2 | 1 | 3 | 24 | 34 | 5 |
| 4. | HV71 | 6 | 1 | 0 | 5 | 22 | 30 | 2 |
