= 1996 Kvalserien =

Swedish ice hockey tournament

The 1996 Kvalserien was the 22nd edition of the Kvalserien. It determined which team of the participating ones would play in the 1996–97 Elitserien season and which three teams would play in the 1996–97 Swedish Division 1 season.

== Tournament ==
| | Club | GP | W | T | L | GF | GA | Pts |
|---|---|---|---|---|---|---|---|---|
| 1. | Brynäs IF | 6 | 4 | 1 | 1 | 26 | 13 | 9 |
| 2. | IF Troja-Ljungby | 6 | 3 | 2 | 1 | 28 | 21 | 8 |
| 3. | Rögle BK | 6 | 0 | 4 | 2 | 13 | 22 | 4 |
| 4. | IF Björklöven | 6 | 0 | 3 | 3 | 15 | 26 | 3 |
