= 1990 Kvalserien =

Swedish ice hockey tournament

The 1990 Kvalserien was the 16th edition of the Kvalserien. It determined which team of the participating ones would play in the 1990–91 Elitserien season and which three teams would play in the 1990–91 Swedish Division 1 season.

== Tournament ==
	Club	GP	W	T	L	GF	GA	Pts
1.	MoDo AIK	6	5	0	1	28	22	10
2.	IK Vita Hästen	6	4	0	2	28	15	8
3.	Rögle BK	6	3	0	3	23	25	6
4.	IF Björklöven	6	0	0	6	15	32	0
