= 1997 Kvalserien =

Swedish ice hockey tournament

The 1997 Kvalserien was the 23rd edition of the Kvalserien. It determined two teams of the participating ones would play in the 1997–98 Elitserien season and which four teams would play in the 1997–98 Swedish Division 1 season.

== Tournament ==
	Club	GP	W	T	L	GF	GA	Pts
1.	Södertälje SK	10	7	1	2	33	22	15
2.	Västerås IK	10	6	2	2	31	25	14
3.	IF Troja-Ljungby	10	5	1	4	30	26	11
4.	Mora IK	10	4	1	5	29	37	9
5.	IF Björklöven	10	3	0	7	30	36	6
6.	Linköpings HC	10	2	1	7	23	30	3
