= 1993 Kvalserien =

Swedish ice hockey tournament

The 1993 Kvalserien was the 19th edition of the Kvalserien. It determined which team of the participating ones would play in the 1993–94 Elitserien season and which three teams would play in the 1993–94 Swedish Division 1 season.

== Tournament ==
	Club	GP	W	T	L	GF	GA	Pts
1.	IF Björklöven	6	4	1	1	21	17	9
2.	IF Troja-Ljungby	6	4	0	2	29	17	8
3.	Hammarby IF	6	2	0	4	24	26	4
4.	Huddinge IK	6	1	1	4	11	25	3
