= 1992 Kvalserien =

Swedish ice hockey tournament

The 1992 Kvalserien was the 18th edition of the Kvalserien. It determined which team of the participating ones would play in the 1992–93 Elitserien season and which three teams would play in the 1992–93 Swedish Division 1 season.

== Tournament ==
	Club	GP	W	T	L	GF	GA	Pts
1.	Leksands IF	6	5	0	1	29	19	10
2.	Boro HC	6	3	0	3	25	21	6
3.	Södertälje SK	6	3	0	3	28	25	6
4.	IK Vita Hästen	6	1	0	5	12	29	2
