= 1989 Kvalserien =

Swedish ice hockey tournament

The 1989 Kvalserien was the 15th edition of the Kvalserien. It determined which team of the participating ones would play in the 1989–90 Elitserien season and which three teams would play in the 1989–90 Swedish Division 1 season.

== Tournament ==
	Club	GP	W	T	L	GF	GA	Pts
1.	Västra Frölunda HC	6	5	0	1	40	20	10
2.	Malmö IF	6	3	0	3	17	31	6
3.	IF Björklöven	6	2	1	3	26	25	5
4.	Örebro IK	6	1	1	4	23	30	3
