= 1977 Kvalserien =

Swedish ice hockey tournament

The 1977 Kvalserien was the third edition of the Kvalserien. It determined which two teams of the participating ones would play in the 1977–78 Elitserien season and which two teams would play in the 1977–78 Swedish Division 1 season.

== Tournament ==
	Club	GP	W	T	L	GF	GA	Pts
1.	Djurgårdens IF	6	5	0	1	41	18	10
2.	Timrå IK	5	4	0	1	28	16	8
3.	HV71	5	2	0	3	24	30	4
4.	KB Karlskoga	6	0	0	6	15	44	0
