= 1985 Kvalserien =

Swedish ice hockey tournament

The 1985 Kvalserien was the 11th edition of the Kvalserien. It determined which team of the participating ones would play in the 1985–86 Elitserien season and which three teams would play in the 1985–86 Swedish Division 1 season.

== Tournament ==
	Club	GP	W	T	L	GF	GA	Pts
1.	HV71	6	4	0	2	31	24	8
2.	IF Troja	6	3	1	2	30	27	7
3.	Västerås IK	6	1	3	2	24	26	5
4.	Skellefteå AIK	6	1	2	3	15	23	4
