= 1980 Kvalserien =

Swedish ice hockey tournament

The 1980 Kvalserien was the sixth edition of the Kvalserien. It determined which two teams of the participating ones would play in the 1980–81 Elitserien season and which three teams would play in the 1980–81 Swedish Division 1 season.

== Tournament ==
	Club	GP	W	T	L	GF	GA	Pts
1.	Skellefteå AIK	4	4	0	0	29	15	8
2.	Södertälje SK	4	3	0	1	22	14	6
3.	Mora IK	4	2	0	2	18	22	4
4.	Bofors IK	3	0	0	3	11	16	0
5.	Luleå HF	3	0	0	3	9	22	0
