= 1988 Kvalserien =

Swedish ice hockey tournament

The 1988 Kvalserien was the 14th edition of the Kvalserien. It determined which team of the participating ones would play in the 1988–89 Elitserien season and which three teams would play in the 1988–89 Swedish Division 1 season.

== Tournament ==
	Club	GP	W	T	L	GF	GA	Pts
1.	Västerås IK	6	5	0	1	39	21	10
2.	Örebro IK	6	4	0	2	30	22	8
3.	Västra Frölunda HC	6	2	0	4	28	30	4
4.	Väsby IK	6	1	0	5	18	42	2
