= 1994 Kvalserien =

Swedish ice hockey tournament

The 1994 Kvalserien was the 20th edition of the Kvalserien. It determined which team of the participating ones would play in the 1994–95 Elitserien season and which three teams would play in the 1994–95 Swedish Division 1 season.

== Tournament ==
| | Club | GP | W | T | L | GF | GA | Pts |
|---|---|---|---|---|---|---|---|---|
| 1. | AIK | 6 | 3 | 2 | 1 | 15 | 10 | 8 |
| 2. | Bodens IK | 6 | 3 | 2 | 1 | 20 | 16 | 8 |
| 3. | IF Troja-Ljungby | 6 | 2 | 1 | 3 | 18 | 20 | 5 |
| 4. | IK Vita Hästen | 6 | 0 | 3 | 3 | 11 | 18 | 3 |
