= 1983 Kvalserien =

Swedish ice hockey tournament

The 1983 Kvalserien was the ninth edition of the Kvalserien. It determined which team of the participating ones would play in the 1983–84 Elitserien season and which three teams would play in the 1983–84 Swedish Division 1 season.

== Tournament ==
	Club	GP	W	T	L	GF	GA	Pts
1.	MoDo AIK	6	4	1	1	32	19	9
2.	Luleå HF	6	3	2	1	25	24	8
3.	HV71	6	3	0	3	26	30	6
4.	Timrå IK	6	0	1	5	21	31	1
