= 2001 Kvalserien =

Swedish ice hockey tournament

The 2001 Kvalserien was the 27th edition of the Kvalserien. It determined two teams of the participating ones would play in the 2001–02 Elitserien season and which four teams would play in the 2001–02 Allsvenskan season.

== Tournament ==
| | Club | GP | W | OTW | OTL | L | GF | GA | Pts |
|---|---|---|---|---|---|---|---|---|---|
| 1. | Södertälje SK | 10 | 6 | 1 | 2 | 1 | 32 | 18 | 21 |
| 2. | Linköpings HC | 10 | 6 | 1 | 1 | 2 | 32 | 23 | 21 |
| 3. | IF Björklöven | 10 | 5 | 2 | 1 | 2 | 36 | 22 | 19 |
| 4. | Leksands IF | 10 | 4 | 2 | 1 | 3 | 37 | 27 | 13 |
| 5. | IK Oskarshamn | 10 | 1 | 1 | 1 | 7 | 22 | 51 | 10 |
| 6. | Hammarby iF | 10 | 1 | 0 | 1 | 8 | 19 | 37 | 6 |
