= 2005 Kvalserien =

The 2005 Kvalserien was the 31st edition of the Kvalserien. It determined two teams of the participating ones would play in the 2005–06 Elitserien season and which four teams would play in the 2005–06 HockeyAllsvenskan season.

== Tournament ==
	Club	GP	W	OTW	OTL	L	GF	GA	Pts	
1.	Leksands IF	10	5	2	2	0	1	38	21	21
2.	Brynäs IF	10	6	0	1	1	2	33	21	20
3.	Malmö IF	10	4	0	3	0	3	29	22	15
4.	Skellefteå AIK	10	4	0	1	1	4	36	39	14
5.	IK Nyköping	10	3	0	1	1	5	28	38	11
6.	IK Oskarshamn	10	1	1	0	0	8	17	40	5
