= 2006 Kvalserien =

Swedish ice hockey tournament

The 2006 Kvalserien was the 32nd edition of the Kvalserien. It determined two teams of the participating ones would play in the 2006–07 Elitserien season and which four teams would play in the 2006–07 HockeyAllsvenskan season.

== Tournament ==
	Club	GP	W	OTW	T	OTL	L	GF	GA	Pts
1.	Malmö Redhawks	10	8	0	0	0	2	43	22	24
2.	Skellefteå AIK	10	7	0	0	0	3	36	23	21
3.	Södertälje SK	10	5	0	1	1	3	35	27	17
4.	Rögle BK	10	5	0	0	0	5	24	28	15
5.	Leksands IF	10	3	0	1	0	6	23	34	10
6.	Bofors IK	10	0	1	0	0	9	19	46	2
