= 2003 Kvalserien =

Swedish ice hockey tournament

The 2003 Kvalserien was the 29th edition of the Kvalserien. It determined two teams of the participating ones would play in the 2003–04 Elitserien season and which four teams would play in the 2003–04 Allsvenskan season.

== Tournament ==
| | Club | GP | W | OTW | OTL | L | GF | GA | Pts |
|---|---|---|---|---|---|---|---|---|---|
| 1. | Linköpings HC | 10 | 7 | 1 | 1 | 1 | 33 | 19 | 24 |
| 2. | Brynäs IF | 10 | 6 | 2 | 0 | 2 | 35 | 27 | 22 |
| 3. | Skellefteå AIK | 10 | 4 | 2 | 0 | 4 | 38 | 32 | 16 |
| 4. | AIK | 10 | 4 | 0 | 0 | 6 | 33 | 36 | 12 |
| 5. | Hammarby IF | 10 | 2 | 0 | 2 | 6 | 31 | 39 | 8 |
| 6. | Rögle BK | 10 | 2 | 0 | 2 | 6 | 32 | 49 | 8 |
