= 2000 Kvalserien =

Swedish ice hockey tournament

The 2000 Kvalserien was the 26th edition of the Kvalserien. It determined two teams of the participating ones would play in the 2000–01 Elitserien season and which four teams would play in the 2000–01 Allsvenskan season.

== Tournament ==
| | Club | GP | W | OTW | OTL | L | GF | GA | Pts |
|---|---|---|---|---|---|---|---|---|---|
| 1. | Timrå IK | 10 | 7 | 0 | 0 | 3 | 34 | 20 | 21 |
| 2. | IF Björklöven | 10 | 6 | 1 | 1 | 2 | 28 | 21 | 21 |
| 3. | Västerås IK | 10 | 6 | 0 | 1 | 3 | 30 | 21 | 19 |
| 4. | Linköpings HC | 10 | 3 | 2 | 0 | 5 | 41 | 38 | 13 |
| 5. | Södertälje SK | 10 | 3 | 0 | 1 | 6 | 23 | 31 | 10 |
| 6. | Nyköpings Hockey 90 | 10 | 1 | 1 | 1 | 7 | 27 | 52 | 6 |
