= 2011 Kvalserien =

Swedish ice hockey tournament

The 2011 Kvalserien was the 37th Kvalserien, played between 14 March and 8 April 2011. Växjö Lakers Hockey and Modo Hockey, who finished 1st and 2nd respectively, qualified for the 2011–12 Elitserien season. Södertälje SK were relegated to HockeyAllsvenskan.

Växjö were the best team in this year's Kvalserien, winning nine games and going undefeated in regulation time. Växjö had already secured their Elitserien spot after the 8th round (Kvalserien has 10 rounds), and thus the team's two following games were unimportant for them, but the team still won 4–2 at home against Rögle and 5–3 away against Mora. Växjö's 4–2 win against Rögle in the ninth round extinguished Rögle's chances of qualifying for the 2011–12 Elitserien season. Växjö finished with 26 points, which is a record in Kvalserien history.

After the 9th round, Modo and Södertälje both had 17 points. The teams met each other in Fjällräven Center in the final round, for a game that directly decided which team would be relegated to HockeyAllsvenskan. Modo won the game 2–0 and thus stayed in Elitserien for the 2011–12 season. This meant that Södertälje were relegated to HockeyAllsvenskan prior to the 2011–12 season.

Örebro made their first Kvalserien since re-qualifying for HockeyAllsvenskan in 2009. Mora made their first Kvalserien since 2008.

== Standings ==
2011 Kvalserien		GP	W	T	L	OTW/SOW	OTL/SOL	GF	GA	DIF	PTS
1	Växjö Lakers HC	10	7	3	0	2	1	36	17	+19	26
2	Modo Hockey	10	5	4	1	1	3	30	15	+15	20
3	Södertälje SK	10	4	3	3	2	1	27	24	+3	17
4	Rögle BK	10	3	2	5	1	1	29	31	−2	13
5	Örebro HK	10	2	2	6	0	2	29	43	−14	8
6	Mora IK	10	2	0	8	0	0	22	43	−21	6

== Game log ==
2011 Kvalserien game log
March

Round	Date	Home	Result	Away	Venue	Attendance
1	March 14	Södertälje SK	3–2 (SO)	Modo Hockey	AXA Sports Center	3,211
1	March 14	Växjö Lakers HC	5–1	Mora IK	Växjö Ishall	2,852
1	March 14	Örebro HK	6–7 (OT)	Rögle BK	Behrn Arena	3,015
2	March 17	Rögle BK	1–2	Växjö Lakers HC	Lindab Arena	3,877
2	March 17	Mora IK	1–6	Södertälje SK	FM Mattsson Arena	2,713
2	March 17	Modo Hockey	6–3	Örebro HK	Fjällräven Center	5,852
3	March 19	Södertälje SK	6–2	Rögle BK	AXA Sports Center	3,722
3	March 19	Växjö Lakers HC	4–2	Örebro HK	Växjö Ishall	3,183
3	March 19	Mora IK	0–3	Modo Hockey	FM Mattsson Arena	3,514
4	March 23	Örebro HK	2–3 (OT)	Södertälje SK	Behrn Arena	3,339
4	March 23	Rögle BK	5–2	Mora IK	Lindab Arena	3,495
4	March 23	Modo Hockey	1–0 (OT)	Växjö Lakers HC	Fjällräven Center	5,508
5	March 25	Södertälje SK	2–3 (SO)	Växjö Lakers HC	AXA Sports Center	4,053
5	March 25	Rögle BK	2–1 (SO)	Modo Hockey	Lindab Arena	4,509
5	March 25	Mora IK	6–3	Örebro HK	FM Mattsson Arena	2,092
6	March 28	Växjö Lakers HC	5–1	Södertälje SK	Växjö Ishall	3,859
6	March 28	Örebro HK	1–4	Mora IK	Behrn Arena	2,126
6	March 28	Modo Hockey	1–2	Rögle BK	Fjällräven Center	4,731
7	March 30	Södertälje SK	1–4	Örebro HK	AXA Sports Center	3,147
7	March 30	Växjö Lakers HC	3–2 (SO)	Modo Hockey	Växjö Ishall	3,869
7	March 30	Mora IK	2–4	Rögle BK	FM Mattsson Arena	2,112

April

Round	Date	Home	Result	Away	Venue	Attendance
8	April 3	Örebro HK	2–5	Växjö Lakers HC	Behrn Arena	2,643
8	April 3	Rögle BK	1–2	Södertälje SK	Lindab Arena	4,971
8	April 3	Modo Hockey	8–1	Mora IK	Fjällräven Center	6,141
9	April 6	Södertälje SK	3–2	Mora IK	AXA Sports Center	4,846
9	April 6	Växjö Lakers HC	4–2	Rögle BK	Växjö Ishall	3,845
9	April 6	Örebro HK	1–4	Modo Hockey	Behrn Arena	3,126
10	April 8	Rögle BK	3–5	Örebro HK	Lindab Arena	2,766
10	April 8	Mora IK	3–5	Växjö Lakers HC	FM Mattsson Arena	1,630
10	April 8	Modo Hockey	2–0	Södertälje SK	Fjällräven Center	7,600
