= 1999–2000 Allsvenskan (ice hockey) season =

Swedish ice hockey season

The 1999–2000 Allsvenskan season was the first season of the Allsvenskan, the second level of ice hockey in Sweden. 24 teams participated in the league, and Timrå IK, Södertälje SK, IF Björklöven, and Nyköpings Hockey 90 qualified for the Kvalserien.

== Regular season ==
=== Northern Group ===
	Club	GP	W	OTW	OTL	L	GF	GA	Pts
1.	IF Björklöven	32	17	6	4	5	121	65	67
2.	Timrå IK	32	19	3	4	6	111	72	67
3.	Södertälje SK	32	19	3	3	7	110	71	66
4.	Nyköpings Hockey 90	32	19	1	1	11	114	75	60
5.	Hammarby IF	32	16	5	1	10	115	83	59
6.	Skellefteå AIK	32	13	6	3	10	112	91	54
7.	Bodens IK	32	11	3	4	14	82	95	43
8.	Arlanda Wings HC	32	10	3	3	16	112	130	39
9.	Piteå HC	32	10	1	2	19	79	115	34
10.	IF Sundsvall Hockey	32	9	1	4	18	57	110	33
11.	Huddinge IK	32	7	3	1	21	73	132	28
12.	Lidingö HC	32	6	1	6	19	76	123	26

=== Southern Group ===
	Club	GP	W	OTW	OTL	L	GF	GA	Pts
1.	Rögle BK	32	20	5	2	5	142	70	72
2.	Mora IK	32	20	2	5	5	111	74	69
3.	Tranås AIF	32	21	0	0	11	104	66	63
4.	IF Troja-Ljungby	32	17	4	0	11	112	98	59
5.	Tingsryds AIF	32	17	3	1	11	126	98	58
6.	IK Oskarshamn	32	13	2	5	12	98	95	48
7.	Bofors IK	32	13	1	3	15	107	103	44
8.	IFK Kumla	32	11	2	2	17	94	116	39
9.	Sunne IK	32	10	2	4	16	98	121	38
10.	IFK Arboga IK	32	11	1	0	20	96	129	35
11.	Gislaveds SK	32	9	0	2	21	85	135	29
12.	Grums IK	32	6	2	0	24	90	158	22

== Superallsvenskan ==
The top two teams qualify for the Kvalserien qualification for Elitserien, and teams 3–6 qualify for the playoffs towards the Kvalserien qualification.

	Club	GP	W	OTW	OTL	L	GF	GA	Pts
1.	Timrå IK	14	10	1	0	3	58	27	32
2.	Södertälje SK	14	7	3	2	2	43	24	29
3.	IF Björklöven	14	8	2	1	3	44	29	29
4.	Rögle BK	14	7	1	3	3	56	40	26
5.	Nyköpings Hockey 90	14	4	1	1	8	34	48	15
6.	Mora IK	14	4	0	2	8	31	53	14
7.	Tranås AIF	14	3	1	2	8	34	49	13
8.	IF Troja-Ljungby	14	2	2	0	10	41	71	10

== Playoffs ==
First round

- Hammarby IF - Mora IK 0:2 (2:3 OT, 1:3)
- Tingsryds AIF - Nyköpings Hockey 90 1:2 (5:1, 1:5, 6:2)
- Skellefteå AIK - Rögle BK 2:1 (4:3 OT, 1:5, 2:3 OT)
- IK Oskarshamn - IF Björklöven 0:2 (2:4, 3:8)

Second round

- Skellefteå AIK - IF Björklöven 0:2 (1:5, 4:5)
- Mora IK - Nyköpings Hockey 90 1:2 (5:1, 2:4, 0:1)

== Relegation round ==
The top two teams in each group qualify for the playoffs towards the Kvalserien qualification for Elitserien, and the two worst teams in each group are relegated to Division 1.

=== Northern Group ===
	Club	GP	W	OTW	OTL	L	GF	GA	Pts (Bonus)
1.	Hammarby IF	14	9	1	1	3	56	44	37(7)
2.	Skellefteå AIK	14	8	1	0	5	51	42	32(6)
3.	IF Sundsvall Hockey	14	8	1	2	3	50	43	30(2)
4.	Lidingö HC	14	6	3	1	4	45	48	25(0)
5.	Bodens IK	14	5	1	2	6	42	42	24(5)
6.	Piteå HC	14	3	3	2	6	47	54	20(3)
7.	Arlanda Wings HC	14	1	2	4	7	37	51	15(4)
8.	Huddinge IK	14	3	1	1	9	42	46	13(1)

=== Southern Group ===
	Club	GP	W	OTW	OTL	L	GF	GA	Pts (Bonus)
1.	Tingsryds AIF	14	7	2	1	4	67	36	33(7)
2.	IK Oskarshamn	14	7	2	1	4	40	33	32(6)
3.	Bofors IK	14	9	0	0	5	38	37	32(5)
4.	IFK Arboga IK	14	7	0	0	7	48	46	23(2)
5.	IFK Kumla	14	5	2	0	7	39	47	23(4)
6.	Gislaveds SK	14	6	0	2	6	43	39	21(1)
7.	Sunne IK	14	4	1	2	7	42	49	19(3)
8.	Grums IK	14	4	0	1	9	38	68	13(0)
