= 2002 Kvalserien =

Swedish ice hockey tournament

The 2002 Kvalserien was the 28th edition of the Kvalserien. It determined two teams of the participating ones would play in the 2002–03 Elitserien season and which four teams would play in the 2002–03 Allsvenskan season.

== Tournament ==
	Club	GP	W	OTW	OTL	L	GF	GA	Pts
1.	Timrå IK	10	6	3	1	0	45	18	21
2.	Leksands IF	10	7	1	2	0	48	24	21
3.	AIK	10	5	1	0	4	28	27	19
4.	IF Björklöven	10	3	0	1	6	36	40	13
5.	Bofors IK	10	3	0	0	7	20	42	10
6.	Bodens IK	10	1	0	1	8	21	47	6
