= 2004 Kvalserien =

Swedish ice hockey tournament

The 2004 Kvalserien was the 30th edition of the Kvalserien. It determined two teams of the participating ones would play in the 2004–05 Elitserien season and which four teams would play in the 2004–05 Allsvenskan season.

== Tournament ==
	Club	GP	W	OTW	OTL	L	GF	GA	Pts
1.	Malmö IF	10	7	1	2	0	31	15	25
2.	Mora IK	10	5	1	0	4	34	30	17
3.	Skellefteå AIK	10	3	3	1	3	24	19	16
4.	Leksands IF	10	3	2	1	4	26	29	14
5.	AIK	10	2	1	2	5	24	31	10
6.	Hammarby IF	10	2	0	2	6	22	37	8
