= 2010 Kvalserien =

Swedish ice hockey tournament

The 2010 Kvalserien was the 36th Kvalserien, played between 21 March and 11 April 2010. Södertälje and AIK, who finished 1st and 2nd respectively, qualified for the 2010–11 Elitserien season. Rögle were relegated to HockeyAllsvenskan.

This year's Kvalserien was one of the closest ones ever. After the 9th round, four teams (AIK, Rögle, Leksand and Almtuna) all had their chance to qualify for the 2010–11 Elitserien season. After the 9th round, AIK were on the second and last Elitserien spot, being one point ahead of Rögle, who had 15 points at that time. AIK needed a win against Växjö at home in Hovet, in order to secure their last Elitserien spot. In the 10th and final round, AIK won 2–0 against Växjö and thus secured their Elitserien spot. AIK finished the 2010 Kvalserien with 18 points, the lowest number of points a team has ever been able to qualify to Elitserien with, ever since Kvalserien started in 1975.

But only after the 7th round, no one even believed that AIK could qualify. At that time, they were at the third place with 10 points, four points behind Rögle. But Rögle lost their two following games, which AIK won, and AIK were therefore at the last Elitserien spot after the 9th round. Södertälje had already secured their Elitserien spot after the 9th round.

Like previous Kvalserien years, Leksand were once again a big disappointment for everyone. They were at the third place with 13 points after the 8th round, only one point behind Rögle, who were on the last Elitserien spot at that time. But Leksand lost 5–2 away against the last ranked team Växjö in the 9th round, and thus, Leksand were forced to win their last game, which was against Almtuna. Although Leksand did win 2–1 against Almtuna, AIK won 2–0 against Växjö, which meant that Leksand missed Elitserien for the fifth consecutive year.

== Standings ==
2010 Kvalserien		GP	W	T	L	OTW/SOW	OTL/SOL	GF	GA	DIF	PTS
1	Södertälje SK	10	5	5	0	1	4	34	28	+6	21
2	AIK	10	5	2	3	1	1	29	24	+5	18
3	Rögle BK	10	3	4	3	3	1	31	26	+5	16
4	Leksands IF	10	4	2	4	2	0	25	24	+1	16
5	Almtuna IS	10	3	3	3	1	2	23	23	0	13
6	Växjö Lakers HC	10	1	2	7	1	1	29	46	−17	6

== Game log ==
2010 Kvalserien game log
March

Round	Date	Home	Result	Away	Venue	Attendance
1	March 21	Södertälje SK	2–0	Rögle BK	AXA Sports Center	4,334
1	March 21	Växjö Lakers HC	5–6	AIK IF	Växjö Ishall	3,096
1	March 21	Almtuna IS	4–2	Leksands IF	Gränbyhallen	2,805
2	March 23	Leksands IF	4–1	Växjö Lakers HC	Ejendals Arena	6,162
2	March 23	AIK IF	3–4	Södertälje SK	Hovet	5,413
2	March 23	Rögle BK	3–2 (SO)	Almtuna IS	Lindab Arena	4,023
3	March 25	Södertälje SK	3–2	Leksands IF	AXA Sports Center	5,976
3	March 25	Växjö Lakers HC	2–3 (SO)	Almtuna IS	Växjö Ishall	2,495
3	March 25	AIK IF	2–3 (OT)	Rögle BK	Hovet	3,847
4	March 27	Almtuna IS	1–3	Södertälje SK	Gränbyhallen	2,916
4	March 27	Leksands IF	2–1	AIK IF	Ejendals Arena	7,650
4	March 27	Rögle BK	5–2	Växjö Lakers HC	Lindab Arena	4,218
5	March 29	Södertälje SK	7–4	Växjö Lakers HC	AXA Sports Center	3,679
5	March 29	Leksands IF	3–4	Rögle BK	Ejendals Arena	7,650
5	March 29	AIK IF	4–1	Almtuna IS	Hovet	2,573

April

Round	Date	Home	Result	Away	Venue	Attendance
6	April 2	Växjö Lakers HC	7–6 (OT)	Södertälje SK	Växjö Ishall	2,502
6	April 2	Almtuna IS	1–2	AIK IF	Gränbyhallen	2,648
6	April 2	Rögle BK	1–2 (OT)	Leksands IF	Lindab Arena	5,150
7	April 4	Södertälje SK	4–3 (OT)	Almtuna IS	AXA Sports Center	3,664
7	April 4	Växjö Lakers HC	3–7	Rögle BK	Växjö Ishall	2,954
7	April 4	AIK IF	2–3	Leksands IF	Hovet	7,023
8	April 6	Almtuna IS	4–0	Växjö Lakers HC	Gränbyhallen	1,254
8	April 6	Leksands IF	3–2 (OT)	Södertälje SK	Ejendals Arena	7,650
8	April 6	Rögle BK	4–5	AIK IF	Lindab Arena	4,989
9	April 8	Södertälje SK	1–2 (OT)	AIK IF	AXA Sports Center	5,741
9	April 8	Växjö Lakers HC	5–2	Leksands IF	Växjö Ishall	2,907
9	April 8	Almtuna IS	3–1	Rögle BK	Gränbyhallen	2,126
10	April 11	Leksands IF	2–1	Almtuna IS	Ejendals Arena	6,353
10	April 11	AIK IF	2–0	Växjö Lakers HC	Hovet	8,079
10	April 11	Rögle BK	3–2 (SO)	Södertälje SK	Lindab Arena	3,745
