= 2006–07 HockeyAllsvenskan season =

- League: HockeyAllsvenskan
- Sport: Ice hockey
- Number of teams: 16
- Total attendance: 679,156
- Average attendance: 1,887
- First place: Södertälje SK
- Top scorer: Pär Arlbrandt (Rögle)
- Promoted to HockeyAllsvenskan to Elitserien: Södertälje SK
- Relegated to Division 1 from HockeyAllsvenskan: IFK Arboga IK

HockeyAllsvenskan seasons
- ← 2005–06 2007–08 →

The 2006–07 HockeyAllsvenskan season was the second season of the HockeyAllsvenskan, the second level of ice hockey in Sweden. 16 teams participated in the league, and the top four qualified for the Kvalserien, with the opportunity to be promoted to the Elitserien.

== Participating teams ==
2006–07 HockeyAllsvenskan teams

== Regular season ==
	Club	GP	W	OTW	T	OTL	L	GF	GA	Pts
1.	Södertälje SK	45	32	4	2	3	4	181	74	109
2.	Rögle BK	45	28	6	1	2	8	159	93	99
3.	Leksands IF	45	28	4	3	2	8	188	109	97
4.	Västerås IK	45	27	0	3	4	11	156	109	88
5.	IF Björklöven	45	23	3	1	3	15	151	112	79
6.	Växjö Lakers Hockey	45	21	1	4	4	15	156	119	73
7.	IK Nyköping	45	19	2	4	3	17	141	141	68
8.	Almtuna IS	45	21	1	0	1	22	126	152	66
9.	AIK	45	18	0	5	5	17	119	121	64
10.	IK Oskarshamn	45	16	2	5	1	21	127	122	58
11.	Bofors IK	45	15	2	5	3	20	135	144	57
12.	IF Sundsvall Hockey	45	10	2	6	4	23	103	154	44
13.	Nybro IF	45	11	3	2	1	28	137	190	42
14.	Hammarby IF	45	9	4	4	1	27	118	206	40
15.	IFK Arboga IK*	45	11	0	3	0	31	96	168	36
16.	Huddinge IK	45	7	4	4	1	29	101	180	34

*IFK Arboga IK did not participate in the relegation round due to their financial situation, and the team was relegated to Division 1 as a result.

== Playoffs ==
=== First round ===
- IK Nyköping - Västerås IK 2:0 (4:3, 3:1)
- Växjö Lakers Hockey - IF Björklöven 1:2 (2:1 OT, 4:5 OT, 2:6)

=== Second round ===
- IK Nyköping - IF Björklöven 1:2 (4:5 OT, 3:1, 1:5)

== Kvalserien ==
	Club	GP	W	OTW	T	OTL	L	GF	GA	Pts
1.	Skellefteå AIK	10	6	2	1	0	1	26	14	23
2.	Södertälje SK	10	4	2	2	1	1	31	22	19
3.	Malmö Redhawks	10	4	1	2	1	2	31	22	17
4.	IF Björklöven	10	3	0	2	2	3	20	27	13
5.	Leksands IF	10	3	0	1	0	6	23	34	10
6.	Rögle BK	10	1	0	0	1	8	22	34	4

== Relegation round ==
	Club	GP	W	OTW	T	OTL	L	GF	GA	Pts
1.	Huddinge IK	8	4	0	3	0	1	29	23	15
2.	Borås HC	8	4	0	1	0	3	32	27	13
3.	Väsby IK	8	2	2	1	0	3	24	23	11
4.	Tingsryds AIF	8	3	0	1	1	3	19	22	11
5.	Piteå HC	8	1	0	2	1	4	17	26	6
