= 2007 Kvalserien =

Swedish ice hockey tournament

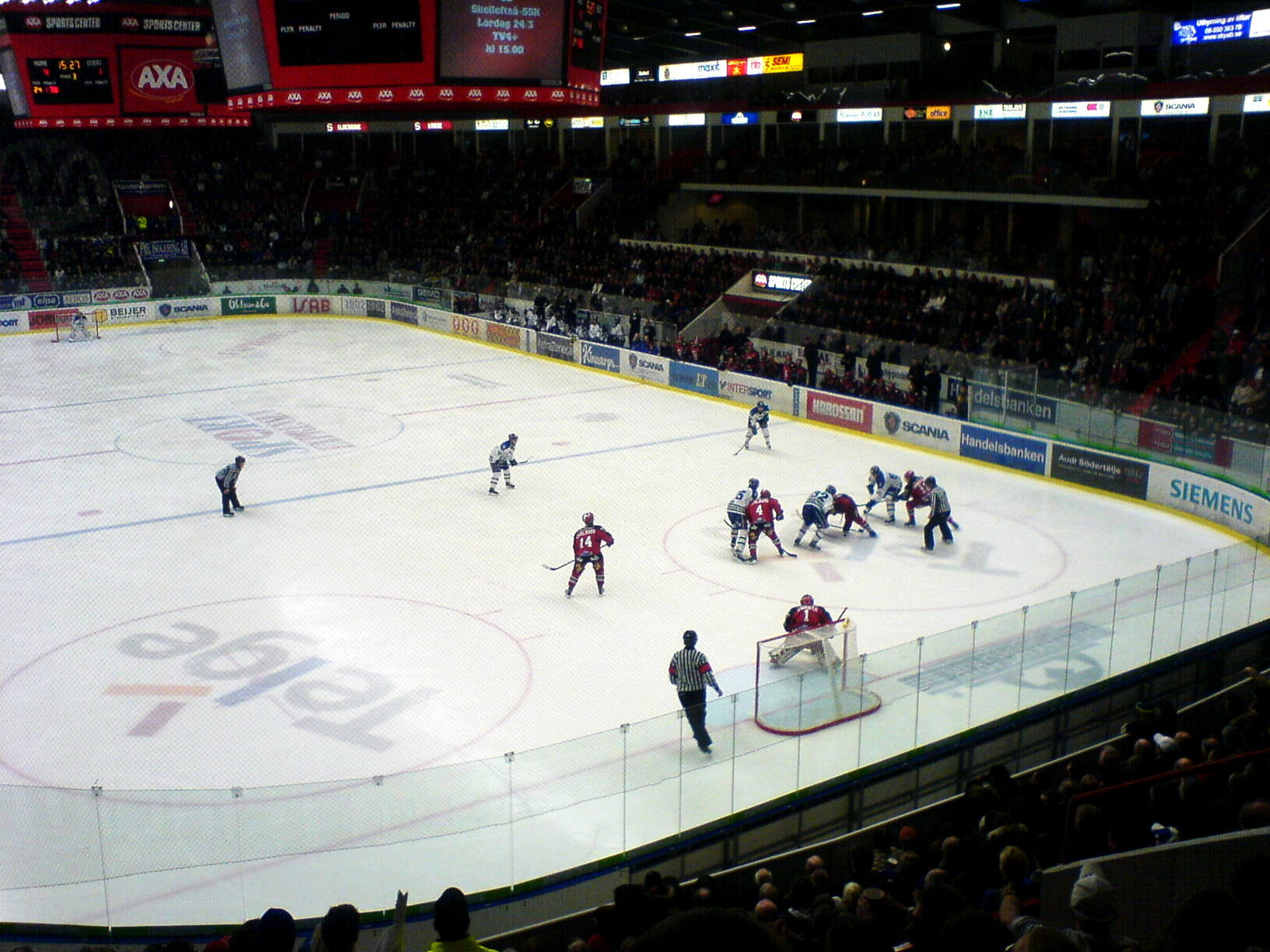
Södertälje SK–Leksands IF

The 2007 Kvalserien was the 33rd edition of the Kvalserien. It determined two teams of the participating ones would play in the 2007–08 Elitserien season and which four teams would play in the 2007–08 HockeyAllsvenskan season.

== Tournament ==
| | Club | GP | W | OTW | T | OTL | L | GF | GA | Pts |
|---|---|---|---|---|---|---|---|---|---|---|
| 1. | Skellefteå AIK | 10 | 6 | 2 | 1 | 0 | 1 | 26 | 14 | 23 |
| 2. | Södertälje SK | 10 | 4 | 2 | 2 | 1 | 1 | 31 | 22 | 19 |
| 3. | Malmö Redhawks | 10 | 4 | 1 | 2 | 1 | 2 | 31 | 22 | 17 |
| 4. | IF Björklöven | 10 | 3 | 0 | 2 | 2 | 3 | 20 | 27 | 13 |
| 5. | Leksands IF | 10 | 3 | 0 | 1 | 0 | 6 | 23 | 34 | 10 |
| 6. | Rögle BK | 10 | 1 | 0 | 0 | 1 | 8 | 22 | 34 | 4 |
