= 2009 Kvalserien =

Swedish ice hockey tournament

The 2009 Kvalserien was the 35th Kvalserien qualification for Elitserien, played between 13 March and 9 April 2009.

The 2009 Kvalserien included six teams. In this year's Kvalserien, Södertälje and Rögle, who both came from Elitserien, qualified for the 2009–10 Elitserien season. It was the first time since 2003 that both teams from Elitserien managed to stay in Elitserien via Kvalserien. AIK made their first Kvalserien qualification for Elitserien since 2004. The Växjö Lakers made their first Kvalserien qualification for Elitserien in the club's history.

Södertälje won the 2009 Kvalserien with 22 points, followed by Rögle with 19. AIK finished in third place, missing out on promotion to Elitserien with 16 points. Leksand missed Elitserien for the fourth consecutive year, ending at 14 points. The Växjö Lakers ended at fifth place with 10 points, and Västerås finished last, with 9 points.

== Standings ==
Pos	Team	Pld	W	OTW	OTL	L	GF	GA	GD	Pts	Qualification
1	Södertälje SK	10	6	1	2	1	39	26	+13	22	Qualify for 2009–10 Elitserien
2	Rögle BK	10	5	2	0	3	36	26	+10	19	Qualify for 2009–10 Elitserien
3	AIK IF	10	5	0	1	4	28	33	−5	16	Qualify for 2009–10 HockeyAllsvenskan
4	Leksands IF	10	4	1	0	5	31	31	0	14	Qualify for 2009–10 HockeyAllsvenskan
5	Växjö Lakers HC	10	3	0	1	6	28	35	−7	10	Qualify for 2009–10 HockeyAllsvenskan
6	VIK Västerås HK	10	2	1	1	6	29	40	−11	9	Qualify for 2009–10 HockeyAllsvenskan

== Game log ==
2009 Kvalserien game log
March

Round	Date	Home	Result	Away	Venue	Attendance
1	13 March	Växjö Lakers HC	3–4 (SO)	Rögle BK	Växjö Ishall	3,154
1	13 March	AIK IF	3–4 (OT)	VIK Västerås HK	Hovet	6,104
1	13 March	Leksands IF	2–3	Södertälje SK	Ejendals Arena	7,650
2	15 March	VIK Västerås HK	3–1	Växjö Lakers HC	ABB Arena	3,006
2	15 March	Södertälje SK	3–1	AIK IF	AXA Sports Center	6,120
2	15 March	Rögle BK	4–2	Leksands IF	Lindab Arena	5,100
3	18 March	Växjö Lakers HC	3–5	Södertälje SK	Växjö Ishall	2,401
3	18 March	AIK IF	5–1	Leksands IF	Hovet	7,689
3	18 March	VIK Västerås HK	1–6	Rögle BK	ABB Arena	4,919
4	22 March	Leksands IF	2–3	Växjö Lakers HC	Ejendals Arena	6,682
4	22 March	Södertälje SK	4–3 (OT)	VIK Västerås HK	AXA Sports Center	4,281
4	22 March	Rögle BK	5–1	AIK IF	Lindab Arena	4,587
5	24 March	Växjö Lakers HC	7–3	AIK IF	Växjö Ishall	2,402
5	24 March	Södertälje SK	2–4	Rögle BK	AXA Sports Center	3,701
5	24 March	VIK Västerås HK	2–4	Leksands IF	ABB Arena	5,148
6	27 March	AIK IF	2–0	Växjö Lakers HC	Hovet	2,845
6	27 March	Leksands IF	5–3	VIK Västerås HK	Ejendals Arena	7,076
6	27 March	Rögle BK	3–2 (SO)	Södertälje SK	Lindab Arena	5,043
7	30 March	Växjö Lakers HC	2–4	Leksands IF	Växjö Ishall	3,026
7	30 March	AIK IF	3–1	Rögle BK	Hovet	4,174
7	30 March	VIK Västerås HK	1–4	Södertälje SK	ABB Arena	3,205

April

Round	Date	Home	Result	Away	Venue	Attendance
8	2 April	Leksands IF	1–2	AIK IF	Ejendals Arena	7,430
8	2 April	Södertälje SK	5–1	Växjö Lakers HC	AXA Sports Center	3,260
8	2 April	Rögle BK	4–3	VIK Västerås HK	Lindab Arena	4,979
9	6 April	Växjö Lakers HC	3–4	VIK Västerås HK	Växjö Ishall	2,216
9	6 April	AIK IF	2–6	Södertälje SK	Hovet	6,352
9	6 April	Leksands IF	4–2	Rögle BK	Ejendals Arena	5,751
10	9 April	Södertälje SK	5–6 (SO)	Leksands IF	AXA Sports Center	5,124
10	9 April	VIK Västerås HK	5–6	AIK IF	ABB Arena	1,750
10	9 April	Rögle BK	3–5	Växjö Lakers HC	Lindab Arena	5,100
