= Linköping HC =

Swedish Hockey League team in Linköping, Östergötland

- Nickname: Cluben (lit. 'The Club')
- City: Linköping, Sweden
- League: Swedish Hockey League
- Founded: 4 August 1976
- Home arena: Saab Arena; Capacity: 8,190
- Colors
- General manager: Peter Jakobsson
- Head coach: Mikael Håkanson
- Captain: Oscar Fantenberg
- Website: lhc.eu

Franchise history
- 1932–1976: BK Kenty
- 1976–2019: Linköpings HC
- 2019–present: Linköping HC

Linköping Hockey Club, often known by its initials LHC, or colloquially among its fans as Cluben, is a Swedish professional ice hockey club from Linköping, founded in 1976. The home arena of the team is Saab Arena (formerly Cloetta Center) which accommodates 8,190 spectators.

Competing in the Swedish Hockey League (SHL; formerly Elitserien), the club is placed twelfth in the marathon standings for the top Swedish ice hockey league.

== History ==
=== 1942–1975: The club's roots ===
In 1942, a group of football players of BK Kenty founded the ice hockey club BK Robbi, who mostly played friendlies against other local clubs on Stångån during the winter. The board of Kenty had first been hesitant to establish a hockey department, but in 1945, the two clubs merged following lengthy discussions. Being heavily dependent on weather conditions, Kenty only played 30 games in five seasons during the second half of the 1940s. By the end of the 1950s, Kenty had established itself in Division 2, the domestic second tier. Meanwhile, the club was also granted a permanent home ground at Folkungavallen, close to the city centre. In 1969, Kenty merged with another local club, IK Terra. In the 1970s, Kenty suffered from internal differences, since part of the club's board wanted to financially prioritize football in favor of ice hockey.

=== 1976–1998: Foundation of LHC and rise to Elitserien ===
Linköping HC was founded on 4 August 1976, as a spin-off from BK Kenty, and moved in to the newly-built indoor arena Stångebro Ishall.

=== 1999–: Establishment in the top division ===
Linköping HC first played in the Swedish Hockey League (SHL; formerly Elitserien) in the 1999–2000 season, and has been in the top division since the 2001–02 season. They have reached the playoffs eight times. LHC reached the final for the first time in 2006–07, where they lost to Modo Hockey. In the 2007–08 season, Linköping HC advanced to the final again, this time against HV71; they lost and won the silver medal.

== Season-by-season results ==
This is a partial list of the last five seasons completed by Linköpings. For the full season-by-season history, see List of Linköping HC seasons.

Season	Level	Division	Record		Avg. home atnd.	Notes
Season	Level	Division	Position	W-OT-L	Avg. home atnd.	Notes
2020–21	Tier 1	SHL	12th	17–7–28	0	
2021–22	Tier 1	SHL	11th	16–13–23	4,987	
2022–23	Tier 1	SHL	12th	20–11–21	6,045	
2023–24	Tier 1	SHL	6th	23–12–17	6,724	
2023–24	Swedish Championship playoffs		—	0–4	8,190	Lost in quarterfinals, 0–4 vs Skellefteå
2024–25	Tier 1	SHL	12th	15–16–21	7,103	

== Players and personnel ==
=== Current roster ===
No.	Nat	Player	Pos	S/G	Age	Acquired	Birthplace
40	(Sweden)	David Bernhardt	D	L	28	2025	Huddinge, Sweden
21	(Sweden)	Christoffer Ehn	LW	L	30	2021	Lidköping, Sweden
18	(Canada)	Remi Elie	LW	L	31	2023	Green Valley, Ontario, Canada
5	(Sweden)	Oscar Fantenberg (C)	D	L	34	2022	Ljungby, Sweden
53	(Sweden)	Adam Hofbauer	C	L	23	2024	Bromma, Sweden
36	(Finland)	Waltteri Ignatjew	G	L	26	2025	Helsinki, Finland
93	(Sweden)	Oliver Johansson	C	L	22	2025	Sundsvall, Sweden
20	(Sweden)	Johan Johnsson	C	L	33	2024	Jönköping, Sweden
70	(Sweden)	Fredrik Karlström	C	L	28	2025	Stockholm, Sweden
48	(Finland)	Mikko Kokkonen	D	L	25	2025	Mikkeli, Finland
23	(Sweden)	Robin Kovács	LW	L	29	2024	Stockholm, Sweden
4	(Sweden)	Oscar Lawner	LW	L	25	2024	Karlstad, Sweden
81	(Sweden)	Theodor Lennström	D	L	31	2025	Stockholm, Sweden
61	(Sweden)	Markus Ljungh (A)	C	L	35	2020	Västerås, Sweden
26	(Canada)	Max Martin	D	L	26	2024	Winnipeg, Canada
31	(Sweden)	Jesper Myrenberg	G	L	26	2022	Täby, Sweden
8	(Sweden)	Jonathan Myrenberg	D	R	23	2021	Täby, Sweden
9	(Sweden)	Erik Norén	D	L	24	2024	Örebro, Sweden
92	(Sweden)	Zion Nybeck	LW	L	24	2025	Alvesta, Sweden
17	(Sweden)	Felix Öhrqvist	D	L	19	2023	Stockholm, Sweden
39	(Canada)	Ty Rattie	RW	R	33	2022	Calgary, Alberta, Canada
2	(Finland)	Rasmus Rissanen	D	L	34	2024	Kuopio, Finland
73	(United States)	Nick Shore	C	R	33	2024	Denver, Colorado, United States
38	(Sweden)	Johan Södergran	W	L	26	2025	Stockholm, Sweden
13	(Czech Republic)	Jakub Vrana	LW	L	30	2025	Prague, Czech Republic

Updated 11 August 2025.

=== Honored members ===
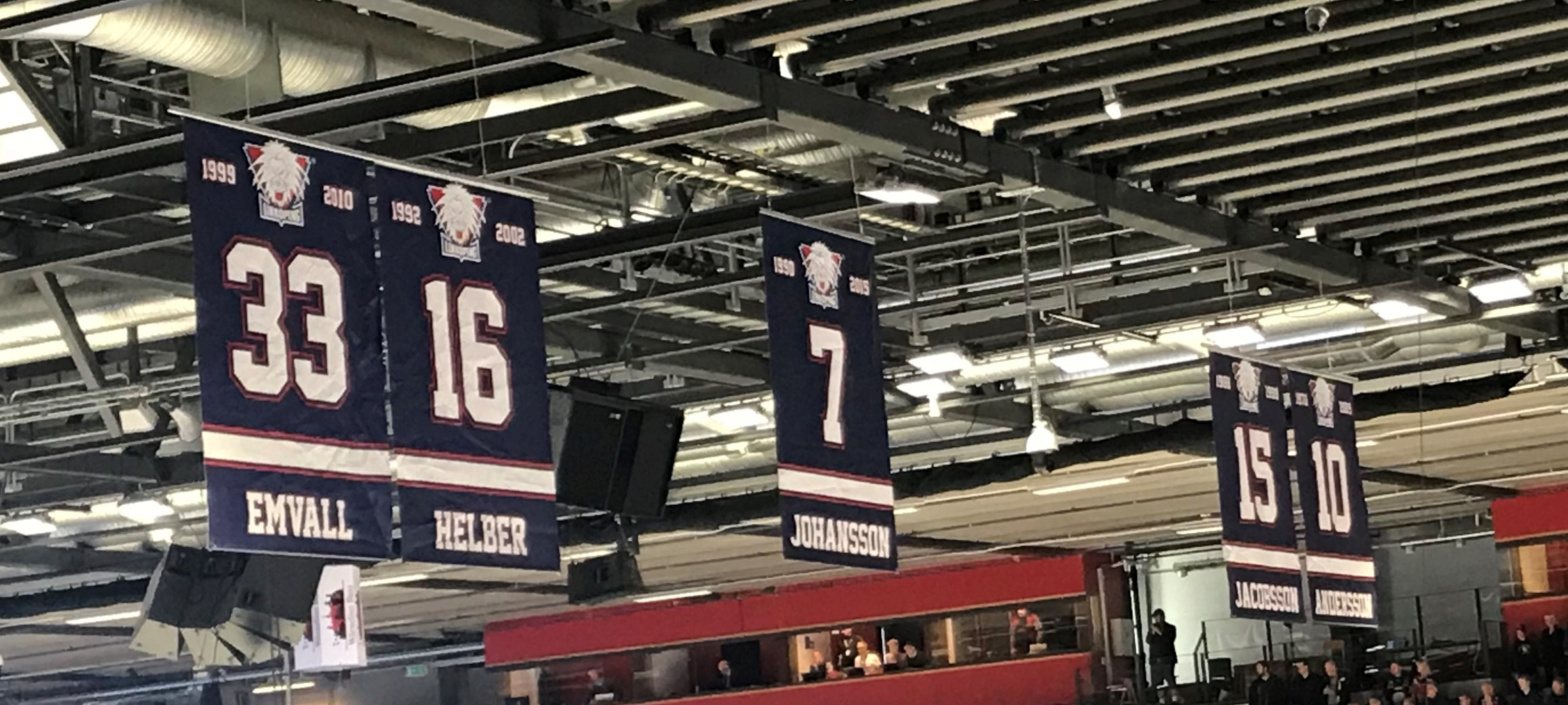
Linköpings Jerseys hanging from the rafters of the Saab Arena.

Linköpings HC retired numbers
No.	Player	Nat.	Position	Career
7	Magnus Johansson	(Sweden)	D	1990–1997, 2004–2007, 2009–2015
10	Mats Andersson	(Sweden)	C	1976–1989
15	Stefan Jakobsson	(Sweden)	F	1988–1999
16	Mike Helber	(United States)	RW	1992–2002
33	Fredrik Emvall	(Sweden)	LW	1999–2010

== Club records and leaders ==
=== Scoring leaders ===
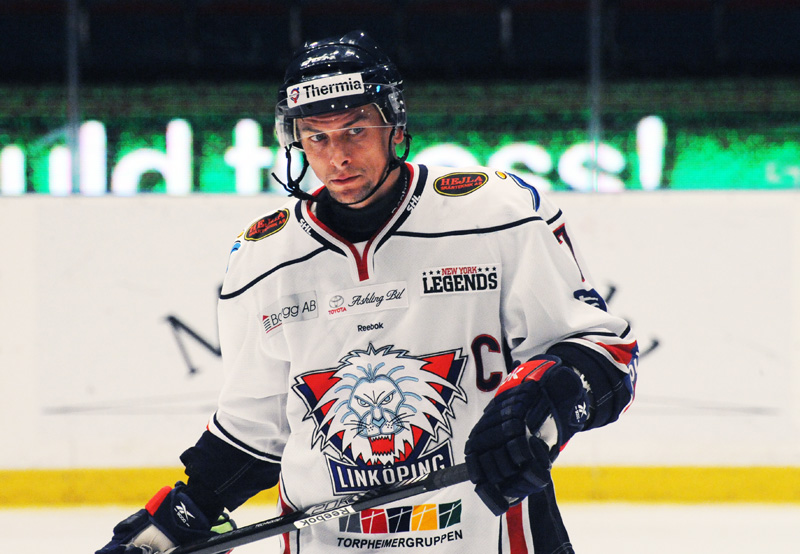
Magnus Johansson.

These are the top-ten point-scorers of Linköping HC since the 1975–76 season, in the top tier (Elitserien and SHL). Figures are updated after each completed regular season.

Note: Pos = Position; GP = Games played; G = Goals; A = Assists; Pts = Points; P/G = Points per game; = current Linköpings HC player

Points
Player	Pos	GP	G	A	Pts	P/G
Broc Little	F	430	170	172	342	0.79
Magnus Johansson	D	463	63	223	286	0.62
Tony Mårtensson	C	312	85	192	277	0.88
Mikael Håkanson	RW	416	84	134	218	0.52
Jonas Junland	D	401	39	135	174	0.43
Niklas Persson	C	316	64	103	167	0.53
Jaroslav Hlinka	C	180	41	126	167	0.93
Markus Ljungh	C	239	59	107	166	0.69
Pär Arlbrandt	RW	162	61	100	161	0.99
Jan Hlaváč	LW	172	81	78	159	0.92

=== Appearance leaders ===
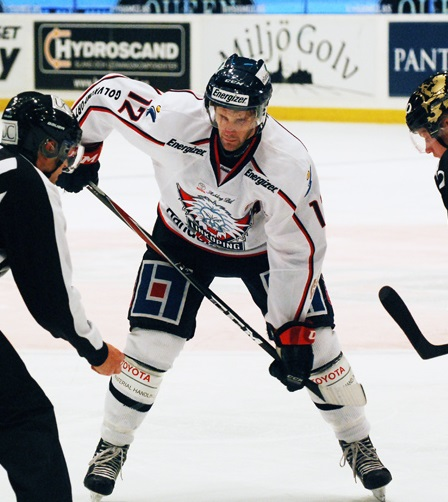
Sebastian Karlsson holds the club record for most games in the SHL.

These are the top-ten players of Linköping HC with the most appearances since the 1975–76 season, in the top tier (Elitserien and SHL). Figures are updated after each completed regular season.

Note: Pos = Position; GP = Games played; G = Goals; A = Assists; Pts = Points; P/G = Points per game; = current Linköpings HC player

Points
Player	Pos	GP	G	A	Pts	P/G
Sebastian Karlsson	C	514	56	52	108	0.21
Fredrik Emvall	LW	497	66	68	134	0.27
Magnus Johansson	D	463	63	223	286	0.62
Broc Little	F	430	170	172	342	0.79
Mikael Håkanson	RW	416	84	134	218	0.52
Henrik Törnqvist	RW	408	59	68	127	0.31
Jonas Junland	D	401	39	135	174	0.43
Andreas Pihl	D	377	21	36	57	0.15
Niklas Persson	C	316	64	103	167	0.53
Tony Mårtensson	C	312	85	192	277	0.88

== Other departments ==
Linköping's women's football team, Linköpings FC, is affiliated with and financially backed by Linköping HC. On 3 October 2008, the club announced that the elite men's and women's teams of local volleyball club Team Valla would also become affiliated with Linköping HC, under the name Linköpings Volleyboll Club.

== Works cited ==
- Hagesund, Johan (2013). Linköpings Hockey Club – och den förändrade självbilden (in Swedish). DIBB Förlag. ISBN 978-91-980755-2-6.
- Torell, Pehr (1999). LHC – från BK Robbi till Elitserien (in Swedish). ISBN 91-630-8878-9.
