= Södertälje SK =

- City: Södertälje, Sweden
- League: HockeyAllsvenskan
- Founded: 22 February 1902
- Home arena: Scaniarinken
- Colors: Navy, white, yellow
- General manager: Robert Andersson
- Head coach: Andreas Johansson
- Captain: Christoffer Liljewall
- Website: sodertaljesk.se

Franchise history
- 1902-present: Södertälje Sportklubb

Championships
- Playoff championships: 1925
- Le Mat Trophy: 1931, 1941, 1944, 1953, 1956, 1985

Södertälje Sportklubb, also known as Södertälje SK and often referred to as SSK, is a Swedish professional ice hockey club playing in HockeyAllsvenskan, the second highest level of pro hockey in Sweden. Södertälje were charter members of Elitserien when the league was founded in 1975 and have since played 24 seasons in the league (1975–1978, 1980–1981, 1983–1992, 1996–1998, 2001–2006, 2007–2011). Södertälje SK's fan club is known as Supporterklubben

== History ==
Södertälje SK was founded on 22 February 1902 and originally featured gymnastics, track and field athletics, soccer, tug of war and speed skating. In 1907, a bandy section was established and the 1910s and 1920s saw the club scoring successes in competitive cycling. In January and February 1925, the club started practicing ice hockey.

The club had played more seasons (74) in the Swedish ice hockey top division until Djurgårdens IF matched that feat in the 2014–15 SHL season. They are the team that's spent the most consecutive seasons in the top division, with 53 consecutive seasons between 1925 and 1978. Södertälje SK have won the Swedish ice hockey championship seven times (1925, 1931, 1941, 1944, 1953, 1956, and 1985). The team has played in the Swedish Hockey League for a combined total of 24 seasons while it was referred to by its previous name, Elitserien.

Södertälje finished the 2004–05 Elitserien season in 8th place and, in the following playoffs that season, advanced to the semifinals. This was the team's best performance in Elitserien since 1989. In the 2005–06 season, however, they were relegated to Allsvenskan (now known as HockeyAllsvenskan). In 2007 the team qualified for Elitserien again. In the 2007–08 season the team finished ninth in Elitserien and thus missed the playoffs but were automatically qualified for the following Elitserien season.

In 2009 and 2010 the team survived Kvalserien in 12th and 11th positions respectively and thus managed to remain in Elitserien. In 2011 Kvalserien, prior to the last round, both Södertälje and Modo had 17 points. Both teams would contest in the final round in Fjällräven Center to determine which team would be relegated to HockeyAllsvenskan. Södertälje unsuccessfully defended its position in Elitserien losing the game 0–2, thus were relegated to HockeyAllsvenskan. Södertälje head coach Peter Popovic was forced out and replaced by Johan Strömwall.

=== Season-by-season ===
The following is a list of seasons 2012–13 to 2016–17. For a more complete list, see List of Södertälje SK seasons.

Season	Level	Division	Record		Avg. home atnd.	Notes	Ref.
Season	Level	Division	Position	W-T-L W-OT-L	Avg. home atnd.	Notes	Ref.
2012–13	Tier 2	HockeyAllsvenskan	2nd	29–7–2–14	3,644		
2012–13	Elitserien qualifiers		6th	2–0–1–7	4,026		
2013–14	Tier 2	HockeyAllsvenskan	12th	16–6–6–24	3,036		
2014–15	Tier 2	HockeyAllsvenskan	14th	10–10–5–27	3,033		
2014–15	HockeyAllsvenskan qualifiers		6th	3–0–1–6	2,941	▼ Relegated to Hockeyettan	
2015–16	Tier 3	HockeyAllsvenskan East	1st of 12	19–0–0–3	2,422		
2015–16	Tier 3	Allettan South	2nd of 8	9–1–1–3	3,168		
2015–16	Tier 3	Playoffs	—	5–1–0–2	3,278	Round 1: won 2–0 in games vs Halmstad HF; Round 2: won 2–1 in games vs Piteå HC; Round 3: won 2–1 in games vs Kristianstads IK	
2015–16	HockeyAllsvenskan qualifiers		1st of 6	6–2–0–2	3,857	▲ Promoted to HockeyAllsvenskan	
2016–17	Tier 2	HockeyAllsvenskan	14th of 14	13–4–3–32	2,650		
2016–17	HockeyAllsvenskan qualifiers		TBD	TBD	TBD		

== Players ==
=== Current roster ===
Updated February 1, 2023.

No.	Nat	Player	Pos	S/G	Age	Acquired	Birthplace
28	(Sweden)	Emil Alba	C	L	28	2020	Stockholm, Sweden
63	(Sweden)	Julius Bergman	D	R	30	2023	Stockholm, Sweden
30	(Sweden)	Fredrik Bergvik	G	L	31	2019	Stockholm, Sweden
22	(Sweden)	Jacob Bjerselius	F	L	27	2022	Vendelsö, Sweden
15	(Sweden)	Albin Carlson	D	L	32	2022	Finspång Municipality
19	(Sweden)	Lucas Carlsson	C	R	31	2013	
70	(Czech Republic)	Alex Ciernik	F	L	21	2022	Wolfsburg, Germany
24	(Sweden)	Jacob Dahlström (A)	RW	R	33	2020	Stockholm, Sweden
33	(Sweden)	Filiph Engsund	C	L	32	2022	Gothenburg, Sweden
77	(Sweden)	Ludvig Hendén	D	L	23	2022	
17	(Sweden)	Johan Ivarsson (A)	D	L	30	2022	Höör, Sweden
83	(Sweden)	Ludvig Jansson	D	R	22	2021	Stockholm, Sweden
29	(Sweden)	Amil Krupic	D	L	30	2023	Halmstad, Sweden
25	(Sweden)	Viktor Lang	D	L	31	2022	Linköping, Sweden
12	(Sweden)	Viktor Liljegren	LW	L	32	2022	Stockholm, Sweden
52	(Sweden)	Christopher Liljewall (C)	F	L	36	2022	Malmö, Sweden
91	(Canada)	Aaron Luchuk	C	L	29	2022	Kingston, Ontario, Canada
21	(Sweden)	Henrik Malmström	D	L	27	2020	
15	(United States)	Patrick Newell	F	L	30	2022	Thousand Oaks, California, US
27	(Sweden)	Daniel Norbe	D	L	30	2022	Växjö, Sweden
20	(Sweden)	Nikola Pasic	RW	L	25	2021	Gislaved, Sweden
23	(Sweden)	Albert Sjöberg	F	R	23	2021	Stockholm, Sweden
31	(Belarus)	Nikita Tolopilo	G	L	26	2021	Minsk, Belarus
84	(Sweden)	Dragan Umicevic	RW	R	41	2021	Dubica, Bosnia and Herzegovina
18	(Sweden)	Linus Videll (A)	F	L	41	2022	Stockholm, Sweden
9	(Austria)	Leon Wallner (A)	LW	R	23	2021	Vienna, Austria

== Board of directors ==
- Chairman of the Board: (Sweden) Catharina Elmsäter-Svärd
- Board Member: (Sweden) Patrik Walle
- Board Member: (Sweden) Håkan Söderberg
- Board Member : (Sweden) Jan Päkkilä
- Board Member: (Sweden) Joakim Gustafsson
- Board Member: (Sweden) Peter Onstrand
- Board Member: (Sweden) Per Hallberg
- Board Member: Firial Saado

=== Management ===
- Club Director: (Sweden) Mats Pernhem
- General Manager: (Sweden) Mats Waltin
- Marketing Manager: (Sweden) Fredrik Aminoff
- Ticket Manager: (Sweden) Jenny Palm

=== Sports ===
- Head Coach: (Sweden) Mats Waltin

=== Kit and Medical ===
- Kit Manager: (Sweden) Anders Kellerstam
- Kitman: (Sweden) Lars Bergström
- Physio: (Sweden) Walter Skeppar
- Team Doctor: (Sweden) Tomas Hopfgarten

== Former coaches ==
- Head Coach: 06/07, 07/08, 08/09 (Sweden) Leif Strömberg
- Head Coach: 09/10, 10/11 (Sweden) Peter Popovic
- Assistant Coach: (Sweden) Peter Larsson
- Assistant Coach: (Sweden) Jörgen Bemström
- Goalkeeper Coach: (Sweden) Stefan Lahde

Preceded by IK Göta	Swedish ice hockey champions 1925	Succeeded by Djurgårdens IF
Preceded by IK Göta	Swedish ice hockey champions 1931	Succeeded by Hammarby IF
Preceded by IK Göta	Swedish ice hockey champions 1941	Succeeded by Hammarby IF
Preceded by Hammarby IF	Swedish ice hockey champions 1944	Succeeded by Hammarby IF
Preceded by Hammarby IF	Swedish ice hockey champions 1953	Succeeded by Djurgårdens IF
Preceded by Djurgårdens IF	Swedish ice hockey champions 1956	Succeeded by Gävle Godtemplares IK
Preceded by AIK	Swedish ice hockey champions 1985	Succeeded by Färjestads BK
