= List of Swedish sportspeople =

This is a list of Swedish sportspeople.

== A ==
- Ara Abrahamian - wrestler
- Mikaela Åhlin-Kottulinsky - racing driver
- Isak Ahrling - ice hockey player
- Tommy Albelin - ice hockey player
- Daniel Alfredsson - ice hockey player
- Helen Alfredsson - golfer
- Philip Alftberg - ice hockey player
- Marcus Allbäck - football player
- Therese Alshammar - swimmer
- Agneta Andersson - canoe racer
- Arne Andersson - athlete
- Conny Andersson - Formula One driver
- Frank Andersson - wrestler
- Håkan Andersson - ice hockey scout
- H. Johan Andersson - ice hockey player
- Johan Andersson - ice hockey player
- Johan A. Andersson - ice hockey player
- Kennet Andersson - football player
- Patrik Andersson - football player
- Rasmus Andersson - ice hockey player
- Mikael Appelgren - table tennis player
- Viktor Arvidsson - ice hockey player
- Joakim Daniel Askling - football player
- Kosovare Asllani - football player
- Emma Asp – football player
- Johan Asplund - ice hockey player
- P. J. Axelsson - ice hockey player
- Jonathan Azulay - football player

== B ==
- Johan Backlund - ice hockey player
- Christian Bäckman - ice hockey player
- Nicklas Bäckström - ice hockey player
- Roony Bardghji - football player
- Bengt Baron - swimmer
- Malin Baryard-Johnsson - show jumper
- Dino Beganovic - racing driver
- Emil Bemström - ice hockey player
- Stellan Bengtsson - table tennis
- Kajsa Bergqvist - high jumper
- Lucas Bergvall - football player
- Jonas Björkman - tennis
- Elias Bjuhr - hockey player
- Jesper Blomqvist - football player
- Jan Boklöv - ski jumper
- Jo Bonnier - Formula One driver
- Martin Boquist - handball player
- Arne Borg - swimmer
- Björn Borg (1919–2009) - swimmer
- Björn Borg (born 1956) - tennis player
- Kenny Bräck - race car driver
- Jesper Bratt - ice hockey player
- Philip Broberg - ice hockey player
- Jonas Brodin - ice hockey player
- Tomas Brolin - football player
- Ricky Bruch - discus thrower

== C ==
- Per Carlén - handball player
- Leo Carlsson - ice hockey player
- Robert Carlsson - ice hockey player

== D ==
- Ulf Dahlén - ice hockey player
- Kjell Dahlin - ice hockey player
- Martin Dahlin - football player
- Rasmus Dahlin - ice hockey player
- Alx Danielsson - racing driver
- Sven Davidson - tennis player
- Armand Duplantis-pole vaulter

== E ==
- Nancy Edberg - swimmer
- Stefan Edberg (born 1966) - tennis player
- Alexander Edler - ice hockey player
- Patrik Edlund - ice hockey player
- Simon Edvinsson - ice hockey player
- Mattias Ekholm - ice hockey player
- Sten Ekberg - track and field athlete
- Nils Ekman - ice hockey player
- Oliver Ekman-Larsson - ice hockey player
- Anthony Elanga - football player
- Tzahi Elihen (born 1991) - Israeli footballer
- Per Elofsson - cross-country skier
- Ludmila Engquist - hurdler
- Pierre Engvall - ice hockey player
- Thomas Enqvist - tennis player
- Marcus Ericsson - Formula One driver
- Anders Eriksson - ice hockey player
- Kenneth Eriksson - rally driver
- Loui Eriksson - ice hockey player
- Sebastian Eriksson - racing driver
- Sven-Göran Eriksson - football manager
- Joel Eriksson Ek - ice hockey player
- Conny Evensson - ice hockey manager

== F ==
- Niclas Fasth - golfer
- Viktor Fasth - ice hockey player
- Nilla Fischer - football player
- Anton Forsberg - ice hockey player
- Filip Forsberg - ice hockey player
- Magdalena Forsberg - biathlete
- Peter Forsberg - ice hockey player
- Gustav Forsling - ice hockey player
- Johan Franzén - ice hockey player
- Gert Fredriksson - canoe racer
- Lars Frölander - swimmer
- Ove Fundin - speedway

== G ==
- Anders Gärderud - steeplechase athlete
- Peter Gentzel - handball player
- Thomas Gradin - ice hockey player
- Gillis Grafström - figure skater
- Anders Graneheim - bodybuilder
- Gunnar Gren - football player
- Nicklas Grossmann - ice hockey player
- Susanne Gunnarsson - Canoe racer
- Tomas Gustafson - speed skater
- Alexander Gustafsson - Mixed Martial Artist
- Andreas Gustafsson (born 1981) - race walker
- Anton Gustafsson - ice hockey player
- Bengt-Åke Gustafsson - ice hockey player
- Filip Gustavsson - ice hockey player
- Viktor Gyökeres - Footballer

== H ==
- Gunder Hägg - middle distance runner
- Joakim Haeggman - golfer
- Linda Haglund - sprinter
- Yared Hagos - ice hockey player
- Peter Hagström - former ice hockey player
- Per Hallin - ice hockey player
- Inge Hammarström - former ice hockey player
- Kurt Hamrin - football player
- Kevin Hansen - racing driver
- Johan Harmenberg - Olympic champion épée fencer
- Niclas Hävelid - ice hockey player
- Johan Hedberg - ice hockey player
- Victor Hedman - ice hockey player
- Jonathan Hedström - ice hockey player
- Ronnie Hellström - football player
- Niklas Hjalmarsson - ice hockey player
- Stefan Holm - high jumper
- Johan Holmqvist - ice hockey player
- Leif "Honken" Holmqvist - ice hockey player
- Michael Holmqvist - ice hockey player
- Tomas Holmström - ice hockey player
- Samuel Hübinette - driver in the Formula D drifting series
- Kristian Huselius - ice hockey player
- Fredrik Hynning - ice hockey player

== I ==
- Zlatan Ibrahimović - football player
- Emma Igelström - swimmer
- Klas Ingesson - football player
- Alexander Isak - football player
- Andreas Isaksson - football player

== J ==
- Jonas Jacobsson - sport shooter
- Vera Jacobsson - track and field athlete
- Jimmie Jansson - ice hockey player
- Calle Järnkrok - ice hockey player
- Anders Järryd - tennis player
- Jonas Jerebko - basketball player
- Sixten Jernberg - cross-country skier
- Bengt Johansson - handball player/coach
- Calle Johansson - ice hockey player
- Ingemar Johansson - boxer
- Joachim Johansson - tennis player
- Jonas Johansson - ice hockey player
- Kjell Johansson - table tennis player
- Marcus Johansson - ice hockey player
- Per-Johan Johansson - ice hockey player
- Stefan Johansson - Formula One driver
- Thomas Johansson - tennis player
- Kim Johnsson - ice hockey player
- Jörgen Jönsson - ice hockey player
- Kenny Jönsson - ice hockey player
- Lars Jonsson - ice hockey player
- Tomas Jonsson - ice hockey player

== K ==
- Charlotte Kalla - cross-country skier
- Kim Källström - football player
- Anders Kallur - ice hockey player
- Jenny Kallur - 100 metres hurdles runner
- Susanna Kallur - 100 metres hurdles runner
- Anna-Karin Kammerling - swimmer
- Andreas Karlsson - ice hockey player
- Erik Karlsson - ice hockey player
- Nils 'Mora-Nisse' Karlsson - cross-country skier
- Peter Karlsson - table tennis
- Ramona Karlsson - racing driver
- William Karlsson - ice hockey player
- Adrian Kempe - ice hockey player
- Ola Kimrin - American football player
- Ove Kindvall - football player
- John Klingberg - ice hockey player
- Carolina Klüft - heptathlete
- Ulrika Knape - diver
- Carin Koch - golfer
- Armand Krajnc - boxer
- Annichen Kringstad - orienteer
- Niklas Kronwall - ice hockey player
- Staffan Kronwall - ice hockey player
- John Kvist - football player

== L ==
- Gabriel Landeskog - ice hockey player
- Adam Larsson - ice hockey player
- Gunnar Larsson - swimmer
- Henrik Larsson - football player
- Alexander Leandersson - ice hockey player
- Eric Lemming - track and field athlete
- Nimrod Levi - Israeli-Swedish basketball player
- Nicklas Lidström - ice hockey player
- Nils Liedholm - football player
- Andreas Lilja - ice hockey player
- Timothy Liljegren - ice hockey player
- Anna Lindberg - diver
- Victor Lindelöf - football player
- Ola Lindgren - handball player
- Elias Lindholm - ice hockey player
- Hampus Lindholm - ice hockey player
- Peja Lindholm - curler
- Peter Lindmark - ice hockey player
- Catarina Lindqvist Ryan - tennis player
- Joakim Lindström - ice hockey player
- Sanny Lindström - ice hockey player
- Willy Lindström - ice hockey player
- Freddie Ljungberg - football player
- Hanna Ljungberg - football player
- Mikael Ljungberg - wrestler
- Håkan Loob - ice hockey player
- Peter Loob - ice hockey player
- Stefan Lövgren - handball player
- Isac Lundeström - ice hockey player
- Henrik Lundqvist - ice hockey player
- Joel Lundqvist - ice hockey player
- Linus Lundqvist - racing driver
- Olle Lycksell - ice hockey player

== M ==
- Hanna Marklund - football player
- Jacob Markström - ice hockey player
- Kim Martin - ice hockey player
- Jesper Mattson - ice hockey player
- Björn Melin - ice hockey player
- Olof Mellberg - football player
- Fredrik Modin - ice hockey player
- Eric Moe - ice hockey player
- Torgny Mogren - cross-country skier
- Mustafa Mohamed - athlete
- Malin Moström - football player
- Doug Murray - ice hockey player
- Mats Wilander - tennis player

== N ==
- Markus Näslund - ice hockey player
- Mats Näslund - ice hockey player
- Liselotte Neumann - golfer
- Catrin Nilsmark - golfer
- Marcus Nilson - ice hockey player
- Gunnar Nilsson - Formula One driver
- Joakim Nilsson (born 1966)
- Joakim Nilsson (born 1985)
- Joakim Nilsson - javelin
- Jonny Nilsson - speed skater
- Kent Nilsson - ice hockey player
- Magnus Nilsson - ice hockey player
- Mats Nilsson - javelin
- Robert Nilsson - ice hockey player
- Roland Nilsson - football player and manager
- Torbjörn Nilsson - football player
- Björn Nittmo - American football kicker
- Joakim Noah - basketball player
- Anette Norberg - curler
- Simon Norberg - ice hockey player
- Gunnar Nordahl - football player
- Niklas Nordgren - ice hockey player
- Tina Nordlund - football player
- Magnus Norman - tennis player
- Mattias Norström - ice hockey player
- Fredrik Nyberg - Alpine skier
- Michael Nylander - ice hockey player
- Peter Nylander - ice hockey player
- William Nylander - ice hockey player
- Gustav Nyquist - ice hockey player
- Stefan Nystrand - swimmer
- Bob Nystrom (born 1952) - Swedish-Canadian ice hockey player

== O ==
- Johnny Oduya - ice hockey player
- Mattias Öhlund - ice hockey player
- Fredrik Olausson - ice hockey player
- Christian Olsson - triple jumper
- Jon Olsson - Skier
- Staffan Olsson - handball player
- Linus Omark - ice hockey player
- Noah Ostlund - ice hockey player

== P ==
- Magnus Pääjärvi-Svensson - ice hockey player
- Samuel Påhlsson - ice hockey player
- Torsten Palm - Formula One driver
- Jesper Parnevik - golfer
- Anja Pärson - alpine skier
- Joakim Persson - football player
- Jörgen Persson - table tennis player
- Ronnie Peterson - Formula One driver
- Johan Petersson - handball player
- Elin Pikkuniemi - Cross-country skier
- Annelie Pompe – freediver
- David Printz - ice hockey player

== R ==
- Rickard Rakell - ice hockey player
- Thomas Ravelli - football player
- Lucas Raymond - ice hockey player
- Tony Rickardsson - speedway rider
- Paolo Roberto - boxer
- Jonny Rödlund - football player
- Viktor Rönnbäck - ice hockey player
- Bertil Roos - Formula One driver
- Maria Rooth - ice hockey player
- Felix Rosenqvist - racing driver
- Thomas Rundqvist - ice hockey player
- Johan Ryno - ice hockey player

== S ==
- Henri Saint Cyr - dressage rider
- Ulrich Salchow - figure skater
- Börje Salming - ice hockey player
- Tommy Salo - ice hockey goalkeeper
- Kjell Samuelsson - ice hockey player
- Magnus Samuelsson - World's Strongest Man in 1998
- Mikael Samuelsson - ice hockey player
- Ulf Samuelsson - former ice hockey player
- Lotta Schelin - football player
- Daniel Sedin - ice hockey player
- Henrik Sedin - ice hockey player
- Agne Simonsson - football player
- Patrik Sjöberg - high jumper
- Fredrik Sjöström - ice hockey player
- Sarah Sjöström - swimmer
- Ragnar Skanåker - pistol shooter
- Lennart "Nacka" Skoglund - football player
- Elmer Soderblom - ice hockey player
- Christian Söderström - ice hockey player
- Annika Sörenstam - golfer
- Alexander Steen - ice hockey player
- Anders Steen - ice hockey player
- Thomas Steen - ice hockey player
- Ingemar Stenmark - alpine skier
- Henrik Stenson - golfer
- Ulf Sterner - ice hockey player
- Niklas Stråhlén - windsurfer
- Anton Strålman - ice hockey player
- Staffan Strand - high jumper
- Stig Strand - alpine skier
- Pär Styf - ice hockey player
- Oscar Sundh - ice hockey player
- Mats Sundin - ice hockey player
- Oskar Sundqvist - ice hockey player
- Niklas Sundström - ice hockey player
- Patrik Sundström - ice hockey player
- Peter Sundström - ice hockey player
- Gunde Svan - cross-country skier
- Johan Svedberg - ice hockey player
- Lennart Svedberg - ice hockey player
- Björn Svensson - ice hockey player
- Tomas Svensson - handball player
- Victoria Svensson - football player

== T ==
- Henrik Tallinder - ice hockey player
- Dick Tärnström - ice hockey player
- Jeffery Taylor - basketball player
- Mikael Tellqvist - ice hockey player
- Jonas Thern - football player
- Daniel Tjärnqvist - ice hockey player
- Mathias Tjärnqvist - ice hockey player
- Ola Toivonen - football player
- Sven Tumba - ice hockey player

== U ==
- Linus Ullmark - ice hockey player

== W ==
- Jan-Ove Waldner - table tennis player
- Niclas Wallin - ice hockey player
- Mats Waltin - ice hockey player
- Fredrik Warg - ice hockey player
- Thomas Wassberg - cross-country skier
- Mattias Weinhandl - ice hockey player
- Mattias Wennerberg - ice hockey player
- Pernilla Wiberg - alpine skier
- Hans Wieselgren (born 1952) - Olympic fencer
- Mats Wilander (born 1964) - tennis player
- Björn Wirdheim - Champ Car driver
- Reine Wisell - Formula One driver
- Magnus Wislander - handball player

== Z ==
- Erkan Zengin - football player
- Henrik Zetterberg - ice hockey player
- Pär Zetterberg - football player
- Fabian Zetterlund - ice hockey player

== See also ==
- List of Swedish Olympic medalists
- Swedish athletes
- Swedish basketball players
- Swedish canoeists
- Swedish footballers
- Swedish golfers
- Swedish high jumpers
- Swedish ice hockey players
- Swedish show jumping riders
- Swedish sport wrestlers
- Swedish swimmers
- Swedish table tennis players
