= Kent Norberg =

Swedish ice hockey player (born 1967)

- Born: June 12, 1967 (age 58) Härnösand, Sweden
- Position: Forward
- Shot: Left
- Played for: Sollefteå HK; Modo Hockey; Skellefteå AIK; Timrå IK
- Playing career: 1986–1997

Kenth Thure "Nubben" Norberg (born June 12, 1967) is a retired Swedish professional ice hockey player and head coach. He later became the sports manager of Timrå IK in the Swedish Swedish Elite League (SEL).

== Playing career ==
Norberg debuted as a young player for Sollefteå HK, and during his second season in 1987 he helped the team take a surprising spot in Allsvenskan in the spring of 1988. After Sollefteå, Norberg was signed by Modo Hockey in Elitserien. Following a good debut season in Elitserien, Norberg had trouble establishing himself as a sophomore. He signed with recently demoted Skellefteå AIK the following season, and became one of the team's most valuable players. After four seasons with Skellefteå AIK, Norberg signed with Timrå IK where he played his final three seasons before retirement.

== Coaching career ==
After retiring as a player, Norberg took the job as assistant coach to Peo Larsson in Timrå IK in 1997. Together they managed to bring Timrå back to Elitserien in 2000. In their first Elitserien season they managed to avoid Kvalserien.

== Management career ==
Prior to the 2001–02 season Norberg left Larsson's side and took the job as the sports manager for Timrå. Timrå struggled and Norberg was forced to fire his former coaching partner Larsson. Timrå led by interim head coach Lars Molin avoided relegation and won Kvalserien. During the off season Norberg's competence was questioned by some. The already struggling team lost their star player Henrik Zetterberg to the Detroit Red Wings. Norberg signed several relatively unknown players such as Niklas Nordgren, Sanny Lindström, and goaltender Kimmo Kapanen. The team led by new head coach Kent Johansson surprised everyone as they finished third in the regular season and reaching the semifinals in the playoff. Norberg was praised for his effort, being commended as leader of the year by the ice hockey journalist association.

Norberg continued to work for Timrå as the sports manager until February 4, 2008, when Frölunda HC announced that he would induct their general manager position on May 1, 2008. Timrå announced the same day that they had released Norberg despite the fact that he had another four years remaining on his contract. Norberg is the first person in Elitserien with the title General Manager.

Norberg resigned from Frölunda HC mid-season during the 2010–11 season. After Timrå's then sports manager Stefan Lindqvist had been forced out from the organization, Norberg re-joined Timrå as the club's sports manager.

== Career statistics ==
			Regular season					Playoffs
Season	Team	League	GP	G	A	Pts	PIM	GP	G	A	Pts	PIM
1986–87	Sollefteå HK	Division 1	31	24	14	38	34	—	—	—	—	—
1987–88	Sollefteå HK	Allsvenskan	34	19	13	32	30	—	—	—	—	—
1988–89	Modo Hockey	Elitserien	35	3	10	13	8	—	—	—	—	—
1989–90	Modo Hockey	Elitserien	11	1	1	2	0	—	—	—	—	—
1989–90	Modo Hockey	Allsvenskan	12	1	2	3	4	8	0	2	2	2
1990–91	Skellefteå AIK	Allsvenskan	35	12	15	27	22	—	—	—	—	—
1991–92	Skellefteå AIK	Division 1	31	24	25	49	12	3	1	0	1	2
1992–93	Skellefteå AIK	Division 1	32	22	19	41	22	5	4	1	5	0
1993–94	Skellefteå AIK	Division 1	32	23	26	49	44	7	0	4	4	0
1994–95	ST Hockey	Division 1	25	4	7	11	16	—	—	—	—	—
1995–96	Timrå IK	Division 1	32	9	10	19	12	4	0	1	1	0
1996–97	Timrå IK	Division 1	27	5	9	14	35	—	—	—	—	—
Elitserien totals			46	4	11	15	8	—	—	—	—	—
