= List of Timrå IK seasons =

This is a list of seasons of Swedish ice hockey club Timrå IK.

== Season-by-season record ==
=== The first five years: 1937–38 to 1941–42 ===
Note: GP = Games played, W = Wins (2 Pts), L = Losses, T = Ties (1 Pt), Pt(s) = Point(s), GF = Goals for, GA = Goals against, WIK = Wifstavarvs IK, ÖIF = Östrands IF

Season	Club	GP	W	L	T	Pts	GF	GA	Finish	Playoffs
1937–38	WIK	11	7	2	2	16	27	17	(Provincial series) (not completed)	Won Provincial Championships; Lost 1st Round (Hermes), Swedish Championships
1937–38	ÖIF	8	2	4	2	6	24	19	(Provincial series) (not completed)	Quarter-finals of Provincial Championships
1938–39	WIK	12	8	2	2	18	53	13	3rd, Provincial series	Finals of Provincial Championships (Swedish Championships of 1939 was cancelled)
1938–39	ÖIF	12	3	8	1	7	21	43	4th, Provincial series	(did not start in Provincial Championships)
1939–40	WIK	10	9	1	0	18	45	11	(Provincial series) (not completed)	Finals of Provincial Championships
1939–40	ÖIF	9	4	4	1	9	18	21	(Provincial series) (not completed)	Quarter-finals of Provincial Championships
1940–41	WIK	6	5	1	0	10	22	6	1st, Provincial series	Won Provincial Championships (Swedish Championships of 1941 was temporarily closed for the Provincial champions)
1940–41	ÖIF	–	–	–	–	–	–	–	(did not start in Provincial series)	Semi-finals of Provincial Championships
1941–42	WIK	1	1	0	0	2	3	1	(Provincial series) (not completed)	(did not start in Provincial Championships)
1941–42	ÖIF	3	2	0	1	5	11	7	(Provincial series) (not completed)	Finals of Provincial Championships

=== Joint forces and lower divisions: 1942–43 to 1955–56 ===
Note: GP = Games played, W = Wins (2 Pts), L = Losses, T = Ties (1 Pt), Pt(s) = Point(s), GF = Goals for, GA = Goals against

Season	Club	GP	W	L	T	Pts	GF	GA	Finish	Playoffs
1942–43	5	4	0	1	9	22	6	(Provincial series) (not completed)	Won Qualification (Nyland); Lost 1st round (Göta), Swedish Championships	
1943–44	–	–	–	–	–	–	–	(Provincial series was cancelled)	Won 1st Qualification (Nyland); Won 2nd Qualification (Skellefteå); Won 1st Round (Brynäs); Lost Quarterfinal (Nacka), Swedish Championships	
1944–45	3	3	0	0	6	24	7	(Provincial series) (not completed)	Won 2nd Qualification (Strand); Won 1st Round (Skellefteå); Lost Quarterfinal (Hammarby), Swedish Championships	
1945–46	4	4	0	0	8	37	11	1st, Provincial series	Won Qualification (Nyland); Won 1st Round on w/o (Skellefteå); Won 2nd Round (Atlas Diesel); Lost Quarterfinal (Södertälje), Swedish Championships	
1946–47	2	2	0	0	4	29	2	(Provincial series) (not completed)	Won 1st Round (Warpen); Won 2nd Round (Hofors); Lost Quarterfinal (Södertälje), Swedish Championships	
1947–48	–	–	–	–	–	–	–	(Provincial series was cancelled)	Won 1st Qualification (Piteå); Won 2nd Qualification (Nyland); Lost 1st Round (Clemensnäs), Swedish Championships	
1948–49	10	9	1	0	18	96	23	1st, Uppsvenska; North Division 3	Won Qualification 1 (Sandviken); Won Qualification 2 (Malung); Promoted to Division 2 (Swedish Championships of 1949 was cancelled)	
1949–50	10	5	3	2	12	47	37	3rd, North Division 2	Lost Qualification (Piteå), Swedish Championships	
1950–51	10	7	3	0	14	67	40	2nd, North Division 2	Won Qualification (Nyland); Won 1st Round (Bofors); Lost 2nd Round (AIK), Swedish Championships (The last open Championships)	
1951–52	10	5	4	1	11	44	41	4th, North Division 2	(Swedish Championships of 1952 was cancelled)	
1952–53	10	5	4	1	11	38	44	3rd, North Division 2	Did not qualify	
1953–54	12	2	8	2	6	48	71	5th, North Division 2	Did not qualify	
1954–55	10	4	4	2	10	43	36	4th, North Division 2	Did not qualify	
1955–56	10	9	1	0	18	72	14	1st, North Division 2	Won Qualification 1 (Clemensnäs); Lost Qualification 2 (Mora); Won Extra qualification (Tranås); Promoted to Division 1	

=== Top division: 1956–57 to 1974–75 ===
Note: GP = Games played, W = Wins (2 Pts), L = Losses, T = Ties (1 Pt), Pt(s) = Points, GF = Goals for, GA = Goals against

Season	Club	GP	W	L	T	Pts	GF	GA	Finish	Playoffs
1956–57	14	6	7	1	13	53	58	4th, North Division 1	Did not qualify	
1957–58	14	7	5	2	16	59	53	4th, North Division 1	Did not qualify	
1958–59	14	4	6	4	12	47	50	5th, North Division 1	Did not qualify	
1959–60	14	5	8	1	11	61	53	4th, North Division 1	Did not qualify	
1960–61	14	8	4	2	18	52	38	3rd, North Division 1	Did not qualify	
1961–62	21	9	11	1	19	64	75	2nd, North Division 1	8th, Swedish Championships series (8 teams)	
1962–63	21	9	10	2	20	64	76	4th, North Division 1	8th, Swedish Championships series (8 teams)	
1963–64	21	10	10	1	21	80	77	6th, North Division 1	3rd, Kvalserien (8 teams)	
1964–65	26	9	10	7	25	103	99	5th, North Division 1	2nd, Kvalserien (4 teams)	
1965–66	21	10	9	2	22	91	78	3rd, North Division 1	Lost in Quarterfinals, 0–2 (Brynäs)	
1966–67	21	9	7	5	23	89	88	5th, North Division 1	Did not qualify	
1967–68	21	5	12	4	14	61	77	6th, North Division 1	Did not qualify	
1968–69	21	8	10	3	19	80	96	5th, North Division 1	Did not qualify	
1969–70	20	9	9	2	20	95	86	5th, North Division 1	1st, Kvalserien (4 teams)	
1970–71	28	11	11	6	28	105	122	4th, North Division 1	5th, Swedish Championships series (8 teams)	
1971–72	28	15	8	5	35	120	92	3rd, North Division 1	3rd, Swedish Championships series (8 teams) (16 pts, behind Brynäs (24 pts) and Leksand (19 pts))	
1972–73	28	8	14	6	22	94	118	4th, North Division 1	8th, Swedish Championships series (8 teams)	
1973–74	35	22	11	2	46	170	134	2nd, North Division 1	2nd, Swedish Championships series (8 teams) (26 pts, behind Leksand (32 pts))	
1974–75	30	18	7	5	41	156	95	4th, North Division 1	Lost in Semifinals, 1–2 (Brynäs); Won 3rd place games, 2–1 (Skellefteå)	

=== Elitserien and below: 1975–76 to 1998–99 ===
Note: GP = Games played, W = Wins (2 Pts), L = Losses, T = Ties (1 Pt), BP = Bonus points (awarded mid-season for Fortsättningsserien teams from 1986–87 to 1998–99), Pts = Points, GF = Goals for, GA = Goals against

Season	GP	W	L	T	BP	Pts	GF	GA	Finish	Playoffs
1975–76	36	7	24	5	–	19	134	181	10th, Elitserien	Relegated to Division 1
1976–77	22	22	0	0	–	44	167	50	1st, North Division 1	Won in Play Off 1, 2–0 (Strömsbro); Won in Play Off 2, 2–1 (Mora); 2nd, Kvalserien (4 teams); Promoted to Elitserien
1977–78	36	5	27	4	–	14	102	180	9th, Elitserien	4th, Kvalserien (5 teams); Relegated to Division 1
1978–79	24	21	2	1	–	43	165	68	1st, North Division 1	Won in Play Off 1, 2–0 (Hammarby); Lost in Play Off 2, 1–2 (Södertälje)
1979–80	27	23	1	3	–	49	194	94	1st, North Division 1	Lost in Play Off 1, 1–2 (Hammarby)
1980–81	27	23	2	2	–	48	195	69	1st, North Division 1	Won in Play Off 1, 2–1 (Strömsbro); Won in Play Off 2, 2–0 (Örebro); 2nd, Kvalserien (4 teams); Promoted to Elitserien
1981–82	36	10	22	4	–	24	106	182	10th, Elitserien	Relegated to Division 1
1982–83	32	24	4	4	–	52	204	74	3rd, Allsvenskan	(Play Off 1 required for Fortsättningsserien teams only); Won in Play Off 2, 2–0 (Piteå IF); Won in Play Off 3, 2–1 (Örebro); 4th, Kvalserien (4 teams)
1983–84	32	15	11	6	–	36	168	122	8th, Allsvenskan	Did not qualify for Kvalserien (4 teams)
1984–85	32	18	9	5	–	41	170	122	1st, North Fortsättningsserien	Lost in Play Off 1, 0–2 (Mora)
1985–86	32	12	15	5	–	29	135	171	8th, Allsvenskan	Did not qualify for Kvalserien (4 teams)
1986–87	32	15	16	1	–	31	169	178	8th, Allsvenskan	Did not qualify for Kvalserien (4 teams)
1987–88	32	20	11	1	7	48	163	124	1st, North Fortsättningsserien	Won in Play Off 1, 2–0 (Mora); Lost in Play Off 2, 1–2 (Väsby)
1988–89	32	20	9	3	7	50	159	93	2nd, North Fortsättningsserien	Won in Play Off 1, 2–1 (Huddinge); Lost in Play Off 2, 1–2 (Vita Hästen)
1989–90	32	21	9	2	7	51	146	104	2nd, North Fortsättningsserien	Lost in Play Off 1, 1–2 (Örebro)
1990–91	32	21	8	3	7	52	168	134	2nd, North Fortsättningsserien	Lost in Play Off 1, 0–2 (Väsby)
1991–92	36	20	12	4	–	44	178	110	9th, Allsvenskan	Did not qualify for Kvalserien (4 teams)
1992–93	32	26	6	0	6	58	165	76	1st, North Fortsättningsserien	Won in Play Off 1, 2–0 (Roma); Lost in Play Off 2, 1–2 (Mora)
1993–94	32	21	9	2	6	50	145	87	2nd, North Fortsättningsserien	Lost in Play Off 1, 0–2 (Hammarby)
1994–95	32	18	12	2	5	43	147	101	3rd, North Fortsättningsserien	Did not qualify for Kvalserien (4 teams)
1995–96	32	24	5	3	7	58	144	82	1st, North Fortsättningsserien	Won in Play Off 1, 2–1 (Hammarby); Lost in Play Off 2, 1–2 (Rögle)
1996–97	32	25	5	2	7	59	163	73	1st, North Fortsättningsserien	Lost in Play Off 1, 0–2 (Nyköping)
1997–98	32	19	9	4	–	42	125	71	5th, Allsvenskan	(Play Off 1 required for Fortsättningsserien teams only); Won in Play Off 2, 2–0 (Boden); Won in Play Off 3, 2–0 (Lidingö); 5th, Kvalserien (6 teams)
1998–99	42	29	10	3	–	61	191	81	4th, Allsvenskan	(Play Off 1 required for Fortsättningsserien teams only); Won in Play Off 2, 2–0 (Kumla); Lost in Play Off 3, 0–2 (Mora)

=== Elitserien: 1999–2000 to 2012–2013 ===
Note: GP = Games played, W = Wins (3 Pts), L = Losses, T = Ties (1 Pt), OTW = Overtime or Shootout wins (1 Pt), Pt(s) = Point(s), GF = Goals for, GA = Goals against, PIM = Penalties in minutes

Season	GP	W	L	T	OTW	Pts	GF	GA	PIM	Finish	Playoffs
1999–2000	46	29	9	8	4	99	169	99	631	1st, SuperAllsvenskan	1st in Kvalserien (6 teams); Promoted to Elitserien
2000–01	50	16	21	13	6	67	136	156	699	9th, Elitserien	Did not qualify
2001–02	50	10	29	11	5	46	99	158	767	12th, Elitserien	1st in Kvalserien (6 teams)
2002–03	50	26	16	8	4	90	155	138	880	3rd, Elitserien	Won in Quarterfinals, 4–0 (Luleå); Lost in Semifinals, 2–4 (Västra Frölunda)
2003–04	50	21	20	9	2	74	117	124	903	6th, Elitserien	Won in Quarterfinals, 4–1 (Linköping); Lost in Semifinals, 1–4 (Färjestad)
2004–05	50	26	13	11	4	93	159	118	1005	3rd, Elitserien	Lost in Quarterfinals, 3–4 (Djurgården)
2005–06	50	16	24	10	1	59	104	128	794	9th, Elitserien	Did not qualify
2006–07	55	22	21	12	4	82	129	136	1021	5th, Elitserien	Lost in Quarterfinals, 3–4 (Modo)
2007–08	55	23	23	9	5	83	134	136	785	5th, Elitserien	Won in Quarterfinals, 4–1 (Modo); Lost in Semifinals, 2–4 (HV71)
2008–09	55	19	24	12	7	76	152	142	728	8th, Elitserien	Lost in Quarterfinals, 3–4 (HV71)
2009–10	55	18	19	18	3	75	138	150	620	8th, Elitserien	Lost in Quarterfinals, 1–4 (HV71)
2010–11	55	17	25	13	9	73	140	165	856	10th, Elitserien	Did not qualify
2011–12	55	10	31	14	8	52	115	183	680	12th, Elitserien	1st in Kvalserien (6 teams)
2012–13	55	12	30	13	8	57	100	127	496	11th, Elitserien	3rd in Kvalserien (6 teams); Relegated to HockeyAllsvenskan

=== SHL and HockeyAllsvenskan: 2013–2014 to present ===
Note: GP = Games played, W = Wins (3 Pts), L = Losses, T = Ties (1 Pt), OTW = Overtime or Shootout wins (1 Pt), Pt(s) = Point(s), GF = Goals for, GA = Goals against Sources:

Season	GP	W	OTW	OTL	L	Pts	GF	GA	Finish	Playoffs
2013–14	52	18	6	16	18	76	124	125	8th, HockeyAllsvenskan	Did not qualify
2014–15	52	20	2	9	23	71	128	139	10th, HockeyAllsvenskan	Did not qualify
2015–16	52	19	8	12	21	77	120	120	8th, HockeyAllsvenskan	5th in Play Off (Slutspelsserien) (6 teams)
2016–17	52	22	7	10	20	83	130	121	6th, HockeyAllsvenskan	5th in Play Off (Slutspelsserien) (6 teams)
2017–18	52	26	7	14	12	99	134	99	1st, HockeyAllsvenskan	Won in Hockeyallsvenskan Final, 3–0 (Leksand); Won in Direktkval, 4–3 (Karlskrona); Promoted to SHL
2018–19	52	10	5	9	33	44	115	182	14th, SHL	Lost in Direktkval, 3–4 (Oskarshamn); Relegated to HockeyAllsvenskan
2019–20	52	29	8	12	11	107	178	116	3rd, HockeyAllsvenskan	(Play Off (Slutspelsserien) (6 teams) cancelled due to the COVID-19 pandemic)
2020–21	52	36	4	2	10	118	199	101	1st, HockeyAllsvenskan	Won in Hockeyallsvenskan Final, 4–1 (IF Björklöven); Promoted to SHL
2021–22	52	14	5	4	29	56	133	177	14th, SHL	Won in Play Out, 4–0 (Djurgårdens IF)
2022–23	52	22	6	3	21	81	137	130	5th, SHL	Lost in Quarterfinals, 3–4 (Örebro HK)
2023–24	52	22	3	8	19	80	133	137	8th, SHL	Lost in Eighth finals, 0–2 (Rögle BK)
2024–25	52	23	4	4	21	81	143	127	6th, SHL	Lost in Quarterfinals, 2–4 (Frölunda HC)
