= Svedberg (surname) =

Svedberg is a Swedish surname. Notable people with the surname include:

- Annakarin Svedberg (born 1934), Swedish writer
- Gunnar Svedberg (born 1947), Swedish chemist and academic
- Hans Svedberg (1931–2012), Swedish ice hockey player
- Hillevi Svedberg (1910–1990), Swedish architect
- Johan Svedberg (born 1980), Swedish ice hockey player
- Jonathan Svedberg (born 1999), Swedish footballer
- Lena Svedberg (1946–1972), Swedish artist
- Lennart Svedberg (1944–1972), Swedish ice hockey player
- Niklas Svedberg (born 1989), Swedish ice hockey player
- Per Svedberg (born 1965), Swedish politician
- Rudolf Svedberg (1910–1992), Swedish sport wrestler
- Ruth Svedberg (1903–2002), Swedish track and field athlete
- Theodor Svedberg (1884–1971), Swedish chemist
- Viktor Svedberg (born 1991), Swedish ice hockey player
- William Svedberg (born 1992), Swedish actor
