= List of Modo Hockey seasons =

This is a list of seasons completed by Modo Hockey of the Elitserien. This list documents the records and playoff results for all seasons that Modo Hockey has competed in since 1975. The league leader indicates the most wins, fewest losses, most goals scored, or fewest goals allowed.

== Seasons ==
=== Prior to Elitserien ===
Swedish Champions	Regular Season Champions	League leader

Season	League	Regular season												Post season results
Season	League	Finish	GP	Wins	Loss	Ties	OTW	OTL	PSW	PSL	GF	GA	Pts	Post season results
1939–40	Elitserien - Ångermanland	2nd	8	4	2	2	--	--	--	--	35	17	10	No playoffs held
1940–41	Elitserien - Ångermanland	2nd	9	6	2	1	--	--	--	--	28	14	13	
1941–42	Elitserien - Northern Ångermanland	1st	6	6	0	0	--	--	--	--	47	6	12	
1942–43	Elitserien - Northern Ångermanland	1st	3	2	0	1	--	--	--	--	11	4	5	
1943–44	Elitserien - Northern Ångermanland	2nd	6	5	0	1	--	--	--	--	37	7	11	
1944–45	Elitserien - Northern Ångermanland	1st	2	2	0	0	--	--	--	--	11	4	4	
1945–46	Elitserien - Ångermanland	1st	8	7	0	1	--	--	--	--	50	9	15	
1946–47	Elitserien - Ångermanland	2nd	5	4	0	1	--	--	--	--	25	22	9	
1947–48	Elitserien - Northern Ångermanland	1st	6	6	0	0	--	--	--	--	45	7	12	
1948–49	Southern Norrland	3rd	6	2	4	0	--	--	--	--	16	36	4	
1949–50	Southern Norrland	4th	6	1	5	0	--	--	--	--	13	29	2	
1950–51	Southern Norrland	3rd	10	5	2	3	--	--	--	--	49	42	13	
1951–52	Southern Norrland	4th	10	4	6	0	--	--	--	--	36	39	8	
1952–53	Division 3 North Uppsvenska	4th	10	3	6	1	--	--	--	--	34	46	7	
1953–54	Division 3 North Uppsvenska	3rd	12	7	4	1	--	--	--	--	66	48	15	
1954–55	Division 3 North Uppsvenska	2nd	10	7	3	0	--	--	--	--	39	29	11	No playoffs held Promoted to Division 2 South Norrland
1955–56	Division 2 Södra Norrland	4th	10	4	5	1	--	--	--	--	35	34	9	No playoffs held
1956–57	Division 2 North B	1st	10	6	2	2	--	--	--	--	63	31	14	Sent to Division 1 qualifying
1956–57	Qualification for Division 1 North	3rd	6	3	3	0	--	--	--	--	21	35	6	Stayed in Division 2 North B
1957–58	Division 2 North B	1st	10	8	1	1	--	--	--	--	54	22	17	Sent to Division 1 North qualifying
1957–58	Qualification for Division 1 North	2nd	6	3	2	1	--	--	--	--	23	19	7	Promoted to Division 1 North
1958–59	Allsvenskan Division 1 North	8th	14	0	12	2	--	--	--	--	29	70	2	Did not qualify Relegated to Division 2 North B
1959–60	Division 2 North B	1st	14	13	0	1	--	--	--	--	107	18	27	Sent to Division 1 North qualifying
1959–60	Qualification for Division 1 North	2nd	6	4	1	1	--	--	--	--	23	19	9	Promoted to Division 1 North
1960–61	Allsvenskan Division 1 North	8th	14	2	12	0	--	--	--	--	33	49	4	Did not qualify Relegated to Division 2 North B
1961–62	Division 2 North B	1st	16	15	1	0	--	--	--	--	115	20	30	Sent to Division 1 North qualifying
1961–62	Qualification for Division 1 North	2nd	6	3	2	1	--	--	--	--	29	20	7	Promoted to Division 1 North
1962–63	Allsvenskan Division 1 North	5th	14	7	6	1	--	--	--	--	63	41	15	Did not qualify Sent to Division 1 North qualifying
1962–63	Qualification for Division 1 North	1st	7	6	1	0	--	--	--	--	36	16	12	Stayed in Division 1 North
1963–64	Allsvenskan Division 1 North	2nd	14	7	2	5	--	--	--	--	45	36	19	Qualified for SM Series
1963–64	SM Series	6th	7	1	5	1	--	--	--	--	23	31	3	
1964–65	Allsvenskan Division 1 North	1st	14	9	3	2	--	--	--	--	80	45	20	Qualified for SM Series
1964–65	SM Series	8th	14	2	8	4	--	--	--	--	44	69	8	
1965–66	Allsvenskan Division 1 North	3rd	21	13	7	1	--	--	--	--	87	59	27	
1965–66	?	?	?	?	?	?	--	--	--	--	??	??	?	
1966–67	?	?	?	?	?	?	--	--	--	--	??	??	?	
1967–68	?	?	?	?	?	?	--	--	--	--	??	??	?	
1968–69	?	?	?	?	?	?	--	--	--	--	??	??	?	
1969–70	?	?	?	?	?	?	--	--	--	--	??	??	?	
1970–71	?	?	?	?	?	?	--	--	--	--	??	??	?	
1971–72	?	?	?	?	?	?	--	--	--	--	??	??	?	
1972–73	?	?	?	?	?	?	--	--	--	--	??	??	?	
1973–74	Allsvenskan Division 1 North	6th	?	?	?	?	--	--	--	--	??	??	?	
1973–74	?	2nd	?	?	?	?	--	--	--	--	??	??	?	
1974–75	Allsvenskan Division 1	5th	30	18	11	1	--	--	--	--	175	122	37	Did not qualify, qualified for Eliteserien

=== Elitserien ===
Season	League	Regular season												Post season results
Season	League	Finish	GP	Wins	Loss	Ties	OTW	OTL	PSW	PSL	GF	GA	Pts	Post season results
1975–76	Elitserien	5th	36	17	15	4	--	--	--	--	150	150	38	Did not qualify
1976–77	Elitserien	4th	36	19	14	3	--	--	--	--	155	140	41	Lost in semifinals, 0–2 (Brynäs IF); Lost in third place, 0–2 (Leksands IF)
1977–78	Elitserien	4th	36	21	12	3	--	--	--	--	151	112	45	Lost in semifinals, 0–2 (Skellefteå AIK)
1978–79	Elitserien	1st	36	24	7	5	--	--	--	--	169	101	53	Won in semifinals, 2–1 (Leksands IF); Won in finals, 2–1 (Djurgårdens IF)
1979–80	Elitserien	8th	36	15	16	5	--	--	--	--	154	139	35	Did not qualify
1980–81	Elitserien	8th	36	12	21	3	--	--	--	--	137	163	27	Did not qualify
1981–82	Elitserien	4th	36	15	14	7	--	--	--	--	149	135	37	Lost in semifinals, 0–2 (IF Björklöven)
1982–83	Elitserien	9th	36	9	21	6	--	--	--	--	128	194	24	Sent to Kvalserien; Won Kvalserien stayed in Elitserien
1983–84	Elitserien	9th	36	12	17	7	--	--	--	--	131	148	31	Sent to Kvalserien; Lost Kvalserien relegation to Division 1
1984–85	Division 1 North	1st	18	15	2	1	--	--	--	--	172	60	31	Qualified for Allsvenskan
1984–85	Allsvenskan	1st	14	10	2	2	--	--	--	--	77	42	22	Won in finals, 3–0 (IF Troja) promoted to Elitserien
1985–86	Elitserien	9th	36	12	16	8	--	--	--	--	134	158	32	Sent to Kvalserien; Won Kvalserien stayed in Elitserien
1986–87	Elitserien	10th	36	8	19	9	--	--	--	--	129	160	25	Sent to Kvalserien; Won Kvalserien stayed in Elitserien
1987–88	Elitserien	5th	40	18	15	7	--	--	--	--	146	141	43	Won in quarterfinals, 2–0 (Södertälje SK); Lost in semifinals, 0–2 (IF Björklöven)
1988–89	Elitserien	9th	40	17	20	3	--	--	--	--	148	170	37	Did not qualify
1989–90	Elitserien	11th	22	7	12	3	--	--	--	--	79	101	17	Relegation to Allsvenskan
1989–90	Allsvenskan	2nd	18	12	4	2	--	--	--	--	92	53	26	Lost in finals, 0–3 (Malmö IF); Sent to Kvalserien; Won Kvalserien promoted to Elitserien
1990–91	Elitserien	10th	40	13	20	7	--	--	--	--	133	164	33	Did not qualify
1991–92	Elitserien	10th	40	6	23	11	--	--	--	--	118	192	23	Did not qualify
1992–93	Elitserien	5th	40	17	17	6	--	--	--	--	145	140	40	Lost in quarterfinals, 1–2 (Malmö IF)
1993–94	Elitserien	8th	40	17	19	4	--	--	--	--	141	151	38	Won in quarterfinals, 3–1 (Leksands IF); Won in semifinals, 2–0 (Djurgårdens IF); Lost in finals, 2–3 (Malmö IF)
1994–95	Elitserien	10th	40	8	22	10	--	--	--	--	120	140	26	Did not qualify
1995–96	Elitserien	6th	40	15	13	12	--	--	--	--	126	133	42	Won in quarterfinals, 3–1 (HV 71 Jönköping); Lost in semifinals, 1–3 (Luleå HF)
1996–97	Elitserien	10th	50	17	27	6	--	--	--	--	136	167	40	Did not qualify
1997–98	Elitserien	6th	46	20	20	6	--	--	--	--	129	123	46	Won in quarterfinals, 3–1 (Leksands IF); Lost in semifinals, 2–3 (Djurgårdens IF)
1998–99	Elitserien	1st	50	30	10	10	3	2	--	--	168	100	103	Won in quarterfinals, 3–1 (Västra Frölunda); Won in semifinals, 3–1 (Malmö IF); Lost in finals, 2–3 (Brynäs IF)
1999–00	Elitserien	6th	50	24	19	7	2	1	2	2	149	134	83	Won in quarterfinals, 4–1 (Västra Frölunda); Won in semifinals, 3–2 (Brynäs IF); Lost in finals, 0–3 (Djurgårdens IF)
2000–01	Elitserien	4th	50	18	16	16	5	2	4	5	133	139	79	Lost in quarterfinals, 3–4 (Luleå HF)
2001–02	Elitserien	2nd	50	25	14	11	3	1	4	3	172	136	93	Won in quarterfinals, 4–0 (Luleå HF); Won in semifinals, 3–2 (Västra Frölunda HC); Lost in finals, 0–3 (Färjestads BK)
2002–03	Elitserien	7th	50	21	21	8	5	1	2	0	140	144	78	Lost in quarterfinals, 2–4 (Västra Frölunda HC)
2003–04	Elitserien	8th	50	16	21	13	5	2	2	4	113	141	68	Lost in quarterfinals, 2–4 (HV71)
2004–05	Elitserien	6th	50	21	17	12	2	5	--	--	143	139	77	Lost in quarterfinals, 2–4 (Färjestads BK)
2005–06	Elitserien	6th	50	24	17	9	0	1	--	--	129	107	81	Lost in quarterfinals, 1–4 (Färjestads BK)
2006–07	Elitserien	3rd	55	24	21	10	3	3	--	--	159	140	85	Won in quarterfinals, 4–3 (Timrå IK); Won in semifinals, 4–3 (HV71); Won in finals, 4–2 (Linköpings HC)
2007–08	Elitserien	3rd	55	26	22	7	5	1	--	--	153	150	90	Lost in quarterfinals, 1–4 (Timrå IK)
2008–09	Elitserien	9th	55	20	27	8	4	2	--	--	153	177	72	Did not qualify
2009–10	Elitserien	9th	55	16	20	19	7	4	--	--	161	150	74	Did not qualify
2010–11	Elitserien	12th	55	17	25	--	3	0	3	7	147	153	70	Sent to Kvalserien; Finished second in Kvalserien stayed in Elitserien
2011–12	Elitserien	8th	55	19	22	--	4	2	4	4	146	147	79	Lost in quarterfinals, 2–4 (Skellefteå AIK)
2012–13	Elitserien	7th	55	19	19	--	7	5	0	5	135	129	81	Lost in quarterfinals, 1–4 (Färjestad BK)
2013–14	SHL	1st	0	0	0	--	0	0	0	0	0	0	0	

== Kvalserien Results ==
Season	League	Regular season												Post season results
Season	League	Finish	GP	Wins	Loss	Ties	OTW	OTL	PSW	PSL	GF	GA	Pts	Post season results
1982–83	Kvalserien	1st	6	4	2	0	--	--	--	--	25	14	8	Won Kvalserien stayed in Elitserien
1983–84	Kvalserien	2nd	6	4	2	0	--	--	--	--	30	21	8	Lost Kvalserien demoted to Division 1
1985–86	Kvalserien	1st	6	4	1	1	--	--	--	--	29	20	9	Won Kvalserien stayed in Elitserien
1986–87	Kvalserien	1st	6	5	0	1	--	--	--	--	31	15	11	Won Kvalserien stayed in Elitserien
1989–90	Kvalserien	1st	6	5	1	0	--	--	--	--	28	22	10	Won Kvalserien stayed in Elitserien
2010–11	Kvalserien	2nd	10	5	1	4	1	0	0	3	30	15	20	Finished second in Kvalserien stayed in Elitserien
