= Isak Ahrling =

Swedish professional ice hockey player

- Born: March 23, 1992 (age 33) Umeå, Sweden
- Height: 5 ft 11 in (180 cm)
- Weight: 181 lb (82 kg; 12 st 13 lb)
- Position: Defence
- Shoots: Left
- Elitserien team: Modo Hockey
- Playing career: 2010–present

Isak Ahrling (born March 23, 1992) is a Swedish professional ice hockey player. He played with Modo Hockey in the Elitserien during the 2010–11 Elitserien season.
