= Sanny Lindström =

Swedish ice hockey player (born 1979)

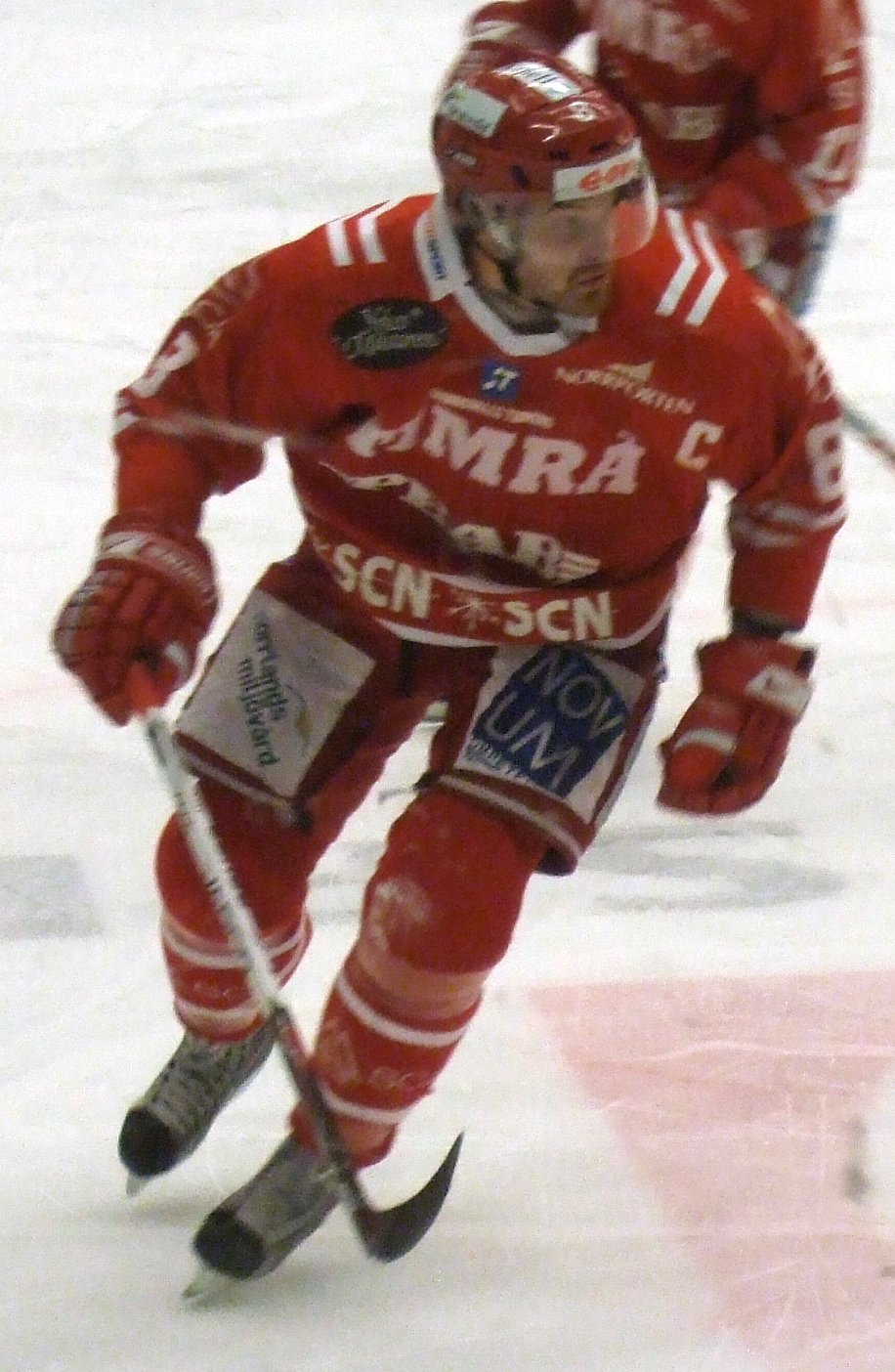
- Born: December 24, 1979 (age 46) Stockholm, Sweden
- Height: 6 ft 1 in (185 cm)
- Weight: 192 lb (87 kg; 13 st 10 lb)
- Position: Defence
- Shot: Left
- Played for: Timrå IK; Hershey Bears; Rapperswil-Jona Lakers; Färjestads BK
- National team: Sweden
- NHL draft: 112th overall, 1999; Colorado Avalanche
- Playing career: 1997–2013

Sanny Lindström (born December 24, 1979) is a Swedish former professional ice hockey defenceman who played in the Swedish Hockey League.

== Playing career ==
Lindström was drafted in the fourth round, 112th overall in the 1999 NHL entry draft by the Colorado Avalanche. Before his selection, Lindström was already playing professionally in the Swedish Division.1 with original club Huddinge IK.

Sanny left for North America the following season, although without a contract from the Avalanche, he signed with AHL affiliate, the Hershey Bears. Unable to sustain a role in the AHL, Lindström played in lower leagues with the Baton Rouge Kingfish and the Quad City Mallards.

Lindström returned to Sweden after three seasons and signed with Timrå IK of the Elitserien in 2002. Establishing himself as a physical defensive defender, he was named captain in 2005 and played in six seasons in total with Timrå before signing a one-year contract with Swiss club Rapperswil-Jona Lakers in 2008.

In the 2008-09 season, Lindström responded positively to his new surroundings as he led the Lakers' defense in scoring with 17 points in 41 games. On April 14, 2009, he returned to the Elitserien on a two-year contract to captain Färjestads BK.

During the early stages of the 2012–13 season, Lindström's fourth with Färjestads, he received a career-ending concussion against Jokerit on October 28, 2012. He announced his retirement from professional hockey after still suffering symptoms 10 months after the injury on August 17, 2013.

== Career statistics ==
=== Regular season and playoffs ===
			Regular season					Playoffs
Season	Team	League	GP	G	A	Pts	PIM	GP	G	A	Pts	PIM
1997–98	Huddinge IK	Swe.1	32	6	6	12	46	—	—	—	—	—
1998–99	Huddinge IK	Swe.1	37	4	3	7	65	—	—	—	—	—
1999–00	Baton Rouge Kingfish	ECHL	11	1	2	3	16	—	—	—	—	—
1999–00	Hershey Bears	AHL	42	1	2	3	57	—	—	—	—	—
2000–01	Quad City Mallards	UHL	5	1	1	2	10	—	—	—	—	—
2000–01	Hershey Bears	AHL	24	0	0	0	61	—	—	—	—	—
2001–02	Quad City Mallards	UHL	38	4	23	27	71	12	0	3	3	20
2001–02	Hershey Bears	AHL	2	0	0	0	0	—	—	—	—	—
2002–03	Timrå IK	SEL	39	1	1	2	81	9	0	1	1	0
2003–04	Timrå IK	SEL	48	1	3	4	91	10	2	0	2	24
2004–05	Timrå IK	SEL	50	5	6	11	109	7	0	1	1	10
2005–06	Timrå IK	SEL	50	2	4	6	83	—	—	—	—	—
2006–07	Timrå IK	SEL	42	4	7	11	88	7	1	0	1	8
2007–08	Timrå IK	SEL	54	3	10	13	99	8	0	0	0	18
2008–09	Rapperswil-Jona Lakers	NLA	41	5	12	17	149	—	—	—	—	—
2009–10	Färjestads BK	SEL	50	3	6	9	50	7	0	0	0	6
2010–11	Färjestads BK	SEL	41	6	6	12	62	14	0	0	0	16
2011–12	Färjestads BK	SEL	46	1	2	3	54	11	0	2	2	12
2012–13	Färjestads BK	SEL	17	0	1	1	22	—	—	—	—	—
SEL totals			437	26	46	72	739	73	3	4	7	94

=== International ===
Medal record

Representing Sweden

Ice hockey

World Championships
Bronze medal – third place	2010 Cologne	

Year	Team	Event	Result	GP	G	A	Pts	PIM
1999	Sweden	WJC	4th	5	0	0	0	2
2005	Sweden	WC	4th	3	0	0	0	0
2010	Sweden	WC	3rd place, bronze medalist(s)	5	0	0	0	0
Junior totals				5	0	0	0	2
Senior totals				8	0	0	0	0

Awards and achievements
Preceded by Robert Carlsson	Timrå IK captains 2005–2008	Succeeded by Pär Styf
