= Patrik Edlund =

Swedish ice hockey player

- Born: March 23, 1992 (age 33) Sundsvall, Sweden
- Height: 6 ft 3 in (191 cm)
- Weight: 187 lb (85 kg; 13 st 5 lb)
- Position: Defence
- Shoots: Right
- Elitserien team: Timrå IK
- Playing career: 2010–present

Patrik Edlund (born March 23, 1992) is a Swedish professional ice hockey player. He played with Timrå IK in the Elitserien during the 2010–11 Elitserien season.
