= Peter Högardh =

Swedish ice hockey player

- Born: May 25, 1976 (age 49) Snöstorp, Sweden
- Height: 5 ft 10 in (178 cm)
- Weight: 198 lb (90 kg; 14 st 2 lb)
- Position: Right wing
- Shot: Left
- Played for: Västra Frölunda HC; Lukko; Kiekko-Espoo; Rögle BK; Modo Hockey; SC Langnau; Füchse Duisburg
- NHL draft: 203rd overall, 1994; New York Islanders
- Playing career: 1992–2010

Peter Högardh (born May 25, 1976) is a Swedish retired professional ice hockey right winger.

== Career ==
Högardh made his professional debut in 1993 for Västra Frölunda of the Elitserien. Högardh was drafted by the New York Islanders, 203rd overall, in the 1994 NHL entry draft. In 1996, he moved to Finland to play in the SM-liiga for Lukko and Kiekko-Espoo before returning to Sweden two years later for second-tier side Rögle BK.

In 2000, Högardh returned to Elitserien with MODO Hockey, staying for four seasons and was the top goal scorer in the Eliteprospects during the 2001-02 season with 22 goals. In 2004, he returned to Frölunda, eight years after leaving the team for Finland. He then played for SC Langnau in Switzerland's Nationalliga A and for Füchse Duisburg in the German Deutsche Eishockey Liga before rejoining Rögle in 2008, who were now playing in Elitserien. He remained until his retirement from playing in 2010.

After retiring, he became a sports manager for Halmstad HF.

== Career statistics ==
=== Regular season and playoffs ===
			Regular season					Playoffs
Season	Team	League	GP	G	A	Pts	PIM	GP	G	A	Pts	PIM
1992–93	Västra Frölunda HC	SWE.2 Jr	15	8	6	14	12	—	—	—	—	—
1993–94	Västra Frölunda HC	SEL	16	1	0	1	2	1	0	0	0	0
1994–95	Västra Frölunda HC	J20	19	11	12	23	14	—	—	—	—	—
1994–95	Västra Frölunda HC	SEL	5	0	0	0	0	—	—	—	—	—
1994–95	Västra Frölunda HC	Allsv	17	4	5	9	4	3	0	0	0	0
1995–96	Västra Frölunda HC	SEL	26	0	2	2	4	—	—	—	—	—
1995–96	Västra Frölunda HC	J20	13	13	16	29	16	—	—	—	—	—
1996–97	Lukko	SM-l	11	0	1	1	0	—	—	—	—	—
1996–97	UJK	FIN.2	4	1	2	3	4	—	—	—	—	—
1996–97	Kiekko-Espoo	SM-l	20	6	6	12	10	4	4	1	5	0
1997–98	Kiekko-Espoo	SM-l	48	6	6	12	36	8	0	2	2	4
1998–99	Rögle BK	SWE.2	38	17	26	43	46	5	1	5	6	2
1999–2000	Rögle BK	SWE.2	43	36	33	69	24	3	1	1	2	4
2000–01	Modo Hockey	SEL	49	13	8	21	26	7	0	1	1	27
2001–02	Modo Hockey	SEL	47	22	25	47	27	14	3	4	7	8
2002–03	Modo Hockey	SEL	48	7	22	29	50	6	3	4	7	6
2003–04	Modo Hockey	SEL	36	8	10	18	6	6	3	3	6	0
2004–05	Frölunda HC	SEL	43	7	22	29	10	11	0	1	1	2
2005–06	Frölunda HC	SEL	50	8	16	24	30	12	1	5	6	8
2006–07	SC Langnau	NLA	25	2	4	6	24	—	—	—	—	—
2007–08	Füchse Duisburg	DEL	53	17	32	49	14	—	—	—	—	—
2008–09	Rögle BK	SEL	55	14	14	28	12	—	—	—	—	—
2009–10	Rögle BK	SEL	47	5	17	22	16	—	—	—	—	—
SEL totals			422	85	136	221	183	57	10	18	28	51

=== International ===
Year	Team	Event	GP	G	A	Pts	PIM
1994	Sweden	EJC	5	2	0	2	0
1996	Sweden	WJC	7	2	2	4	2
Junior totals			12	4	2	6	2
