= Elias Bjuhr =

Swedish ice hockey player

- Born: October 17, 1988 (age 38) Sweden
- Height: 5 ft 10 in (178 cm)
- Weight: 178 lb (81 kg; 12 st 10 lb)
- Position: Centre
- Shoots: Left
- GET team Former teams: Lillehammer IK; Modo Hockey; Nyköpings HK; Olofströms IK; Östersunds IK
- Playing career: 2007–present

Elias Bjuhr (born October 17, 1988) is a Swedish ice hockey player. He has played for Modo Hockey and other teams in the Elitserien.
