= Fredrik Hynning =

Swedish ice hockey player

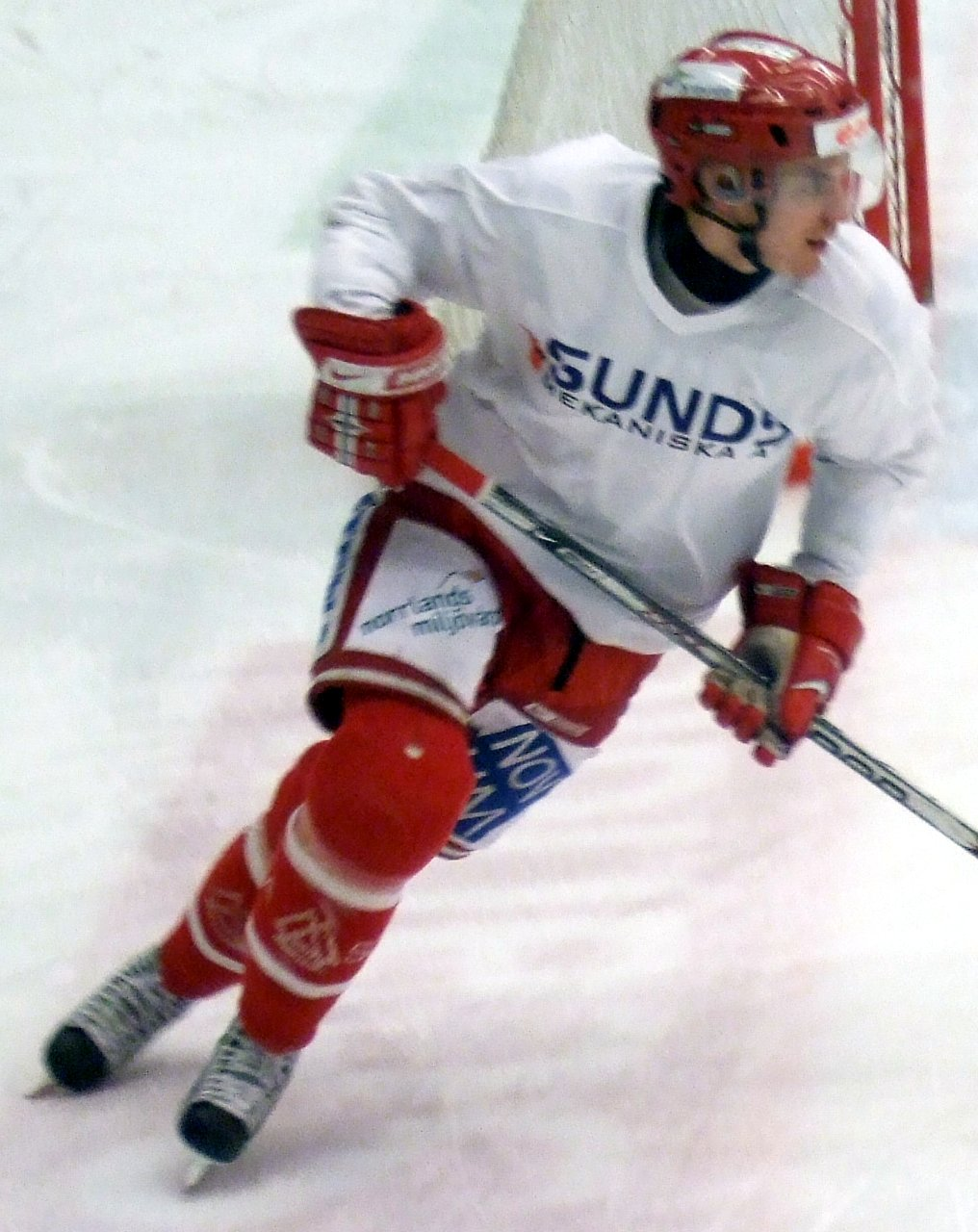
- Born: May 15, 1983 (age 42); Stockholm, SWE
- Height: 6 ft 1 in (185 cm)
- Weight: 185 lb (84 kg; 13 st 3 lb)
- Position: LW
- Shot: Left
- Played for: Timrå IK; Luleå HF; Skellefteå AIK; AIK
- Playing career: 2000–2016

Fredrik Hynning (born May 15, 1983, in Stockholm, Sweden) is a former ice hockey forward who last played for the AIK hockey team in the Swedish HockeyAllsvenskan league.

== Career statistics ==
			Regular season					Playoffs
Season	Team	League	GP	G	A	Pts	PIM	GP	G	A	Pts	PIM
1999–00	AIK IF J18	J18 Allsvenskan	14	11	8	19	2	4	0	1	1	0
2000–01	AIK IF J18	J18 Allsvenskan	2	1	0	1	4	—	—	—	—	—
2000–01	AIK IF J20	J20 SuperElit	20	9	12	21	12	5	1	2	3	6
2000–01	AIK IF	Elitserien	1	0	0	0	0	—	—	—	—	—
2001–02	AIK IF J20	J20 SuperElit	31	27	25	52	40	4	3	3	6	10
2001–02	AIK IF	Elitserien	2	0	0	0	0	—	—	—	—	—
2001–02	HC Örebro 90	Allsvenskan	6	0	2	2	0	—	—	—	—	—
2002–03	AIK IF J20	J20 SuperElit	2	2	5	7	0	—	—	—	—	—
2002–03	AIK IF	Allsvenskan	41	7	13	20	26	10	1	4	5	10
2003–04	AIK IF	Allsvenskan	46	20	17	37	34	10	2	4	6	2
2004–05	Luleå HF	Elitserien	43	0	9	9	4	4	0	0	0	4
2005–06	Luleå HF	Elitserien	49	11	7	18	14	6	3	0	3	0
2006–07	Luleå HF	Elitserien	53	17	26	43	30	4	0	1	1	2
2007–08	Timrå IK	Elitserien	17	4	0	4	4	11	1	7	8	0
2008–09	Timrå IK	Elitserien	47	15	21	36	24	7	2	1	3	6
2009–10	Timrå IK	Elitserien	53	8	21	29	34	5	1	3	4	2
2010–11	Timrå IK	Elitserien	18	2	9	11	8	—	—	—	—	—
2011–12	Skellefteå AIK	Elitserien	44	1	3	4	10	11	0	0	0	4
2012–13	AIK IF	Elitserien	50	5	6	11	18	—	—	—	—	—
2013–14	AIK IF	SHL	53	6	6	12	22	—	—	—	—	—
2014–15	AIK IF	HockeyAllsvenskan	51	7	8	15	44	—	—	—	—	—
2015–16	AIK IF	HockeyAllsvenskan	49	8	8	16	28	10	0	1	1	10
SHL/Elitserien totals			430	69	108	177	168	48	7	12	19	18
