= Pär Styf =

Swedish ice hockey player

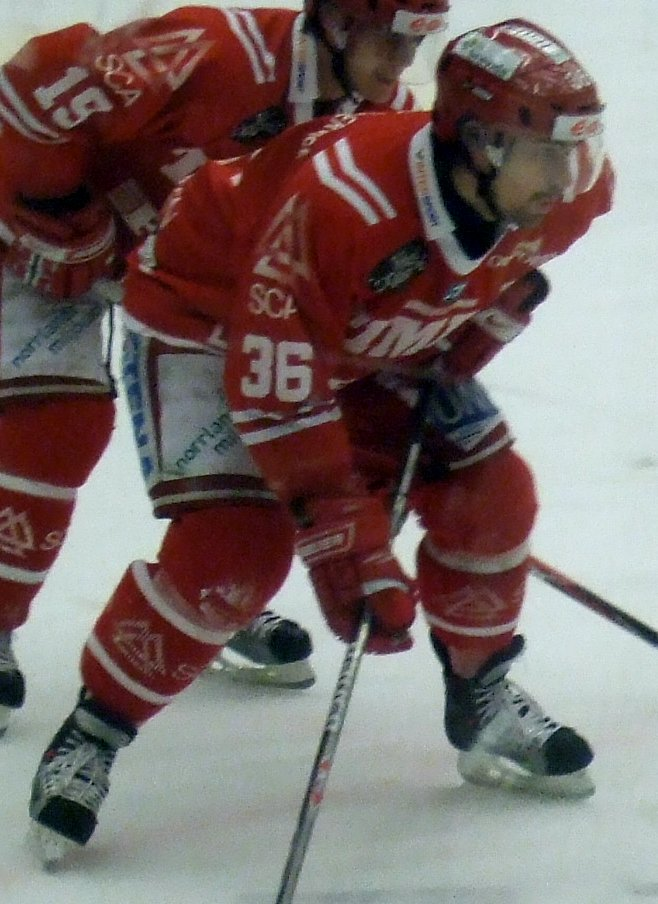
- Born: April 11, 1979 (age 47) Sollefteå, Sweden
- Height: 6 ft 1 in (185 cm)
- Weight: 193 lb (88 kg; 13 st 11 lb)
- Position: Defence
- Shot: Right
- Played for: Timrå IK
- National team: Sweden
- NHL draft: 240th overall, 1997; Philadelphia Flyers
- Playing career: 1998–2011

Pär Styf (born April 11, 1979) is a Swedish former professional ice hockey defenceman who played for the Timrå IK hockey team in the Swedish Elitserien league. He was selected in the ninth round of the 1997 NHL entry draft, 240th overall by the Philadelphia Flyers, but spent his entire career with Timrå.

== Career statistics ==
			Regular season					Playoffs
Season	Team	League	GP	G	A	Pts	PIM	GP	G	A	Pts	PIM
1994–95	Antjärns IK J18	J18 Div.2	—	—	—	—	—	—	—	—	—	—
1995–96	MoDo Hockey J18	J18 Div.1	—	—	—	—	—	—	—	—	—	—
1995–96	MoDo Hockey J20	J20 SuperElit	26	1	2	3	41	—	—	—	—	—
1996–97	MoDo Hockey J20	J20 SuperElit	11	2	4	6	—	—	—	—	—	—
1997–98	MoDo Hockey J20	J20 SuperElit	17	7	5	12	60	—	—	—	—	—
1997–98	Örnsköldsviks SK	Division 1	5	1	0	1	35	—	—	—	—	—
1997–98	Husums IF	Division 1	5	1	0	1	35	—	—	—	—	—
1998–99	Örnsköldsviks SK	Division 1	26	5	11	16	73	—	—	—	—	—
1999–00	Timrå IK	Allsvenskan	37	1	2	3	88	10	1	2	3	14
2000–01	Timrå IK	Elitserien	42	4	5	9	36	—	—	—	—	—
2000–01	Mörrums GoIS IK	Allsvenskan	2	0	0	0	31	—	—	—	—	—
2001–02	Timrå IK	Elitserien	43	5	1	6	83	—	—	—	—	—
2002–03	Timrå IK	Elitserien	47	8	9	17	112	10	0	1	1	20
2003–04	Timrå IK	Elitserien	43	6	4	10	79	4	0	0	0	6
2004–05	Timrå IK	Elitserien	45	8	5	13	94	7	0	0	0	33
2005–06	Timrå IK	Elitserien	27	2	4	6	78	—	—	—	—	—
2006–07	Timrå IK	Elitserien	53	6	10	16	118	7	1	0	1	14
2007–08	Timrå IK	Elitserien	47	4	11	15	62	9	4	1	5	43
2008–09	Timrå IK	Elitserien	26	6	5	11	36	7	1	2	3	10
2009–10	Timrå IK	Elitserien	34	3	6	9	44	5	0	1	1	2
2010–11	Timrå IK	Elitserien	26	0	4	4	30	—	—	—	—	—
2011–12	Team Härnösand	Division 2	1	0	0	0	0	—	—	—	—	—
2012–13	Ulvö HK	Division 2	3	2	1	3	2	—	—	—	—	—
Elitserien totals			433	52	64	116	772	49	6	5	11	128
