= Niklas Stråhlén =

Swedish former professional windsurfer (born 1987)

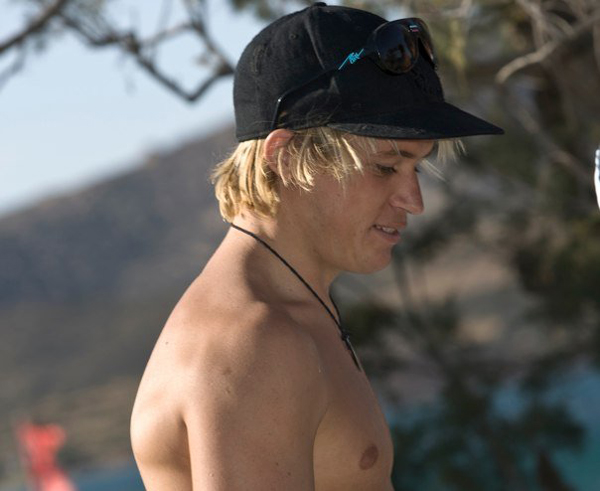
- Born: 4 September 1987 (age 39)
- Occupation: Professional windsurfer
- Awards: Winner of the Swedish and Nordic Championships (2007) Winner of the European Freestyle Pro Tour (2011)

Niklas Stråhlén (born 4 September 1987) is a Swedish former professional windsurfer.

== History ==
Stråhlén was born on 4 September 1987 in Gothenburg, Sweden. He started competing as a professional windsurfer in 2006. He won the Swedish and Nordic Championships in 2007, and competed for Sweden in the World Championship for the first time in 2008. In 2009, he placed fifth in the European Freestyle Pro Tour. In 2011, he shared first place on the European Freestyle Pro Tour.
