= Simon Norberg =

Swedish ice hockey player (born 1996)

- Born: February 1, 1996 (age 30) Hedemora, Sweden
- Height: 6 ft 0 in (183 cm)
- Weight: 168 lb (76 kg; 12 st 0 lb)
- Position: Centre
- Shoots: Left
- SHL team: Leksands IF
- NHL draft: Undrafted
- Playing career: 2014–present

Simon Norberg (born February 1, 1996) is a Swedish ice hockey player. He is currently playing with Leksands IF of the Swedish Hockey League (SHL).

Norberg made his Swedish Hockey League debut playing with Leksands IF during the 2014–15 SHL season.
