= Vera Jacobsson =

Swedish long jumper

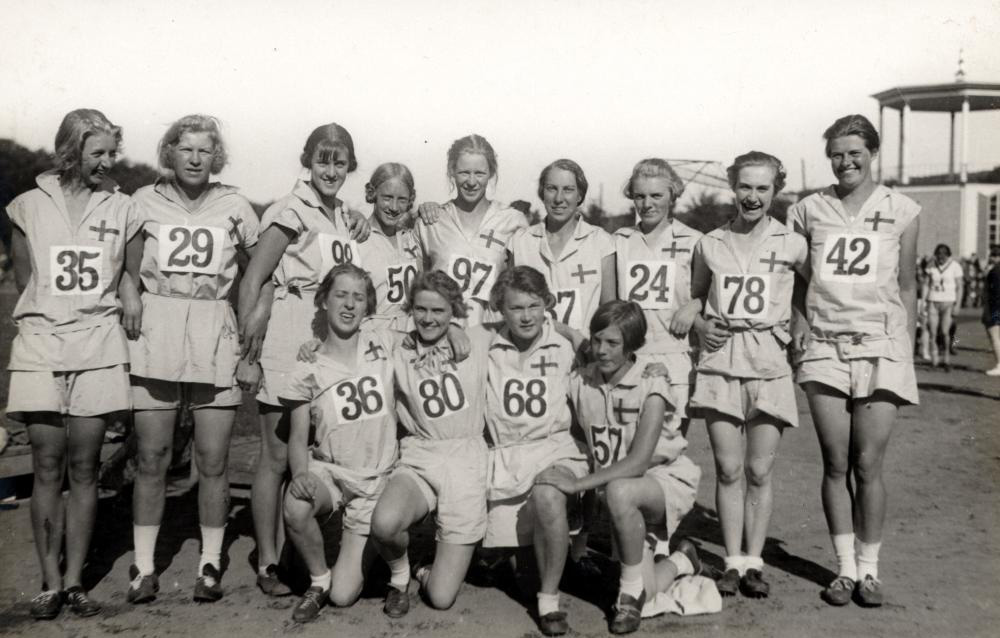
- Jacobsson, second-right at the front row with number 68, at the 1926 Women's World Games

Personal information
- Nationality: Swedish
- Born: c. 1900s

Sport
- Sport: Track and field athletics
- Event(s): Sprint events, standing long jump

Vera Jacobsson (born circa 1900s) was a Swedish long jumper and sprinter who played a role in pioneering women's athletics in Sweden.

== Biography ==
Jacobsson represented Sweden at the 1926 Women's World Games in Gothenburg. With a distance of 2.28 metres, she finished sixth in the standing long jump event. Together with Sylvia Stave, Asta Plathino, and Märta Johansson, she also competed in the 4 × 110 yards relay. Her relay team secured a fourth-place finish.

Jacobsson's participation in the Women's World Games was made possible through sponsorship by Idun, a prominent Swedish women's magazine.
