= Jimmie Jansson =

Swedish ice hockey player

- Born: July 30, 1994 (age 31) Västerås, Sweden
- Height: 6 ft 0 in (183 cm)
- Weight: 179 lb (81 kg; 12 st 11 lb)
- Position: Defence
- Shoots: Left
- SHL team: HV71
- NHL draft: Undrafted
- Playing career: 2014–present

Jimmie Jansson (born July 30, 1994) is a Swedish ice hockey defenceman. He is currently playing with HV71 of the Swedish Hockey League (SHL).

Jansson made his Swedish Hockey League debut playing with HV71 during the 2013–14 SHL season.
