= Ulf Thors =

Swedish ice hockey player and coach

- Born: June 14, 1952 (age 73) Sweden
- Height: 6 ft 2 in (188 cm)
- Weight: 190 lb (86 kg; 13 st 8 lb)
- Position: Centre
- Shot: Left
- Played for: Modo Hockey
- Playing career: 1973–1984

Ulf Thors (born June 14, 1952) is a former ice hockey player and coach who played for Modo Hockey in the 1970s. He won the Elitserien playoffs and became Swedish champion with Modo in 1979. He later became head coach for Modo in 1989.

== Career statistics ==
| | | | Regular season | | | | | Playoffs |
| Season | Team | League | GP | G | A | Pts | PIM | GP | G | A | Pts | PIM |
|---|---|---|---|---|---|---|---|---|---|---|---|---|
| 1976–77 | Modo Hockey | SEL | 36 | 8 | 18 | 26 | 34 | — | — | — | — | — |
| 1977–78 | Modo Hockey | SEL | 35 | 13 | 9 | 22 | 38 | — | — | — | — | — |
| 1981–82 | Modo Hockey | SEL | 35 | 11 | 13 | 24 | 36 | — | — | — | — | — |
| SEL totals | | | 106 | 32 | 40 | 72 | 108 | – | – | – | – | – |
