= Johan Svedberg =

Swedish ice hockey player

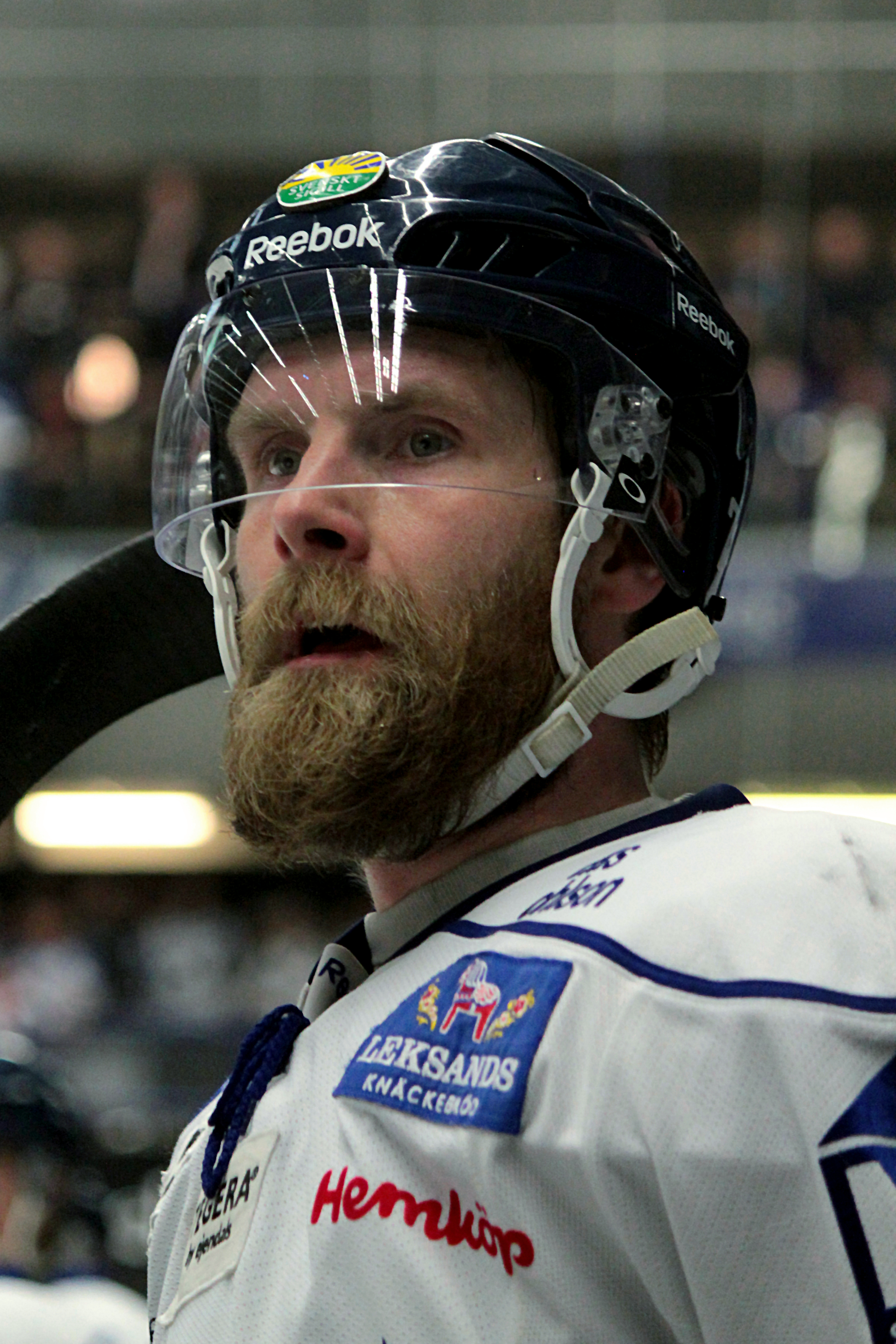
- Born: February 14, 1980 (age 46) Kalix, Sweden
- Height: 6 ft 2 in (188 cm)
- Weight: 194 lb (88 kg; 13 st 12 lb)
- Position: Defence
- Shot: Left
- Played for: Timrå IK; Leksands IF
- Playing career: 1998–2016

Johan Svedberg (born February 14, 1980) is a Swedish former professional ice hockey defenceman who played in the Swedish Hockey League for Timrå IK and Leksands IF.

== Playing career ==
On April 2, 2004, Johan signed with Timrå IK for one year. Later the same year, on October 27, 2004 Svedberg was named the first in the line of four candidates for Elitserien Rookie Of The Year 2005. The award was eventually won by the forward Oscar Steen. After the rookie season, his contract was extended to 2006–07 on April 8, 2005.

On May 8, 2007, following his third season with Timrå, the defenceman joined IF Björklöven in Allsvenskan, a team he stayed with for three seasons before moving on to Leksands IF after the regulation of Björklöven to Division 1 due to financial difficulties.

== Awards ==
- Elitserien 2004–05 Rookie of the Year Nominee in 2004.

== Career statistics ==
			Regular season					Playoffs
Season	Team	League	GP	G	A	Pts	PIM	GP	G	A	Pts	PIM
1997–98	IF Sundsvall Hockey	Division 1	7	0	0	0	0	—	—	—	—	—
1998–99	IF Sundsvall Hockey	Division 1	27	1	0	1	31	—	—	—	—	—
1999–00	IF Sundsvall Hockey	Allsvenskan	46	1	1	2	14	—	—	—	—	—
2000–01	IF Sundsvall Hockey	Allsvenskan	29	0	5	5	8	—	—	—	—	—
2001–02	IF Sundsvall Hockey	Allsvenskan	46	6	8	14	44	—	—	—	—	—
2002–03	IF Sundsvall Hockey	Allsvenskan	35	6	2	8	57	2	0	0	0	0
2003–04	IF Sundsvall Hockey	Allsvenskan	46	6	16	22	67	2	0	1	1	4
2004–05	Timrå IK	Elitserien	37	3	3	6	32	7	0	1	1	0
2005–06	Timrå IK	Elitserien	50	2	8	10	42	—	—	—	—	—
2006–07	Timrå IK	Elitserien	42	0	3	3	78	1	0	0	0	0
2007–08	IF Björklöven	HockeyAllsvenskan	31	0	7	7	48	1	0	0	0	2
2008–09	IF Björklöven	HockeyAllsvenskan	40	2	8	10	48	—	—	—	—	—
2009–10	IF Björklöven	HockeyAllsvenskan	49	10	17	27	44	—	—	—	—	—
2010–11	Leksands IF	HockeyAllsvenskan	49	5	6	11	34	3	1	0	1	2
2011–12	Leksands IF J20	J20 SuperElit	1	0	1	1	0	—	—	—	—	—
2011–12	Leksands IF	HockeyAllsvenskan	36	1	5	6	36	7	0	0	0	0
2012–13	Leksands IF	HockeyAllsvenskan	52	2	7	9	36	10	1	2	3	4
2013–14	Leksands IF	SHL	53	1	3	4	22	—	—	—	—	—
2014–15	Leksands IF	SHL	20	0	0	0	4	—	—	—	—	—
2014–15	IF Sundsvall Hockey	Hockeyettan	5	0	0	0	2	10	1	1	2	8
2015–16	IF Sundsvall Hockey	HockeyAllsvenskan	50	2	6	8	38	—	—	—	—	—
SHL/Elitserien totals			202	6	17	23	178	8	0	1	1	0
Allsvenskan totals			202	19	32	51	190	4	0	1	1	4
HockeyAllsvenskan totals			307	22	56	78	284	21	2	2	4	8
