= Jonas Johansson =

Jonas Johansson may refer to:

- Jonas Johansson (ice hockey, born 1982), Swedish ice hockey defenceman
- Jonas Johansson (ice hockey, born 1984), Swedish ice hockey forward
- Jonas Johansson (ice hockey, born 1995), Swedish ice hockey goaltender
