= Philip Alftberg =

Swedish collegiate ice hockey defenceman

- Born: January 19, 1997 (age 28) Märsta, Sweden
- Height: 5 ft 8 in (173 cm)
- Weight: 181 lb (82 kg; 12 st 13 lb)
- Position: Defense
- Shoots: Right
- NCAA team Former teams: St. Lawrence University; Brynäs IF
- NHL draft: Undrafted
- Playing career: 2014–present

Philip Alftberg (born January 19, 1997) is a Swedish collegiate ice hockey defenceman. He is currently playing Division 1 men's ice hockey with St. Lawrence University of the ECAC.

He formerly played professionally in his native Sweden with Brynäs IF of the Swedish Hockey League (SHL). Alftberg made his SHL debut playing with Brynäs IF during the 2014–15 SHL season.
