= Nils Johansson (ice hockey, born 1938) =

Swedish ice hockey player

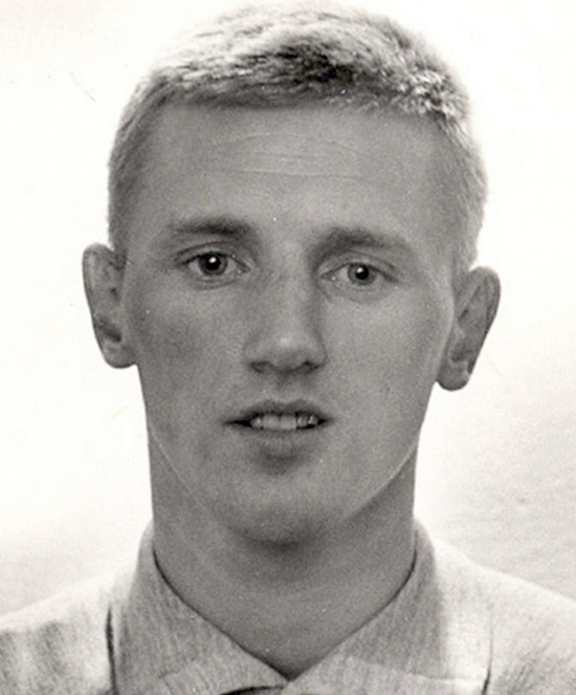
- Nils Johansson, circa 1964

Personal information
- Born: 24 July 1938 (age 87) Örnsköldsvik, Sweden
- Height: 180 cm (5 ft 11 in)
- Weight: 70 kg (154 lb)

Sport
- Sport: Ice hockey
- Club: MoDo AIK, Örnsköldsvik (1956–70); Färjestads BK (1970–75)
Medal record
Representing Sweden
Olympic Games
Silver medal – second place	1964 Innsbruck	Team
World Championships
Gold medal – first place	1962 Colorado Springs/Denver	Team
Silver medal – second place	1963 Stockholm	Team
Bronze medal – third place	1965 Tampere	Team
Silver medal – second place	1967 Vienna	Team
Silver medal – second place	1969 Stockholm	Team
Silver medal – second place	1970 Stockholm	Team

Nils-Rune Tommy Johansson (born 24 July 1938) is a Swedish former professional ice hockey defenceman. He competed at the 1964 and 1968 Olympics and finished in second and fourth place, respectively. Between 1960 and 1970 he capped 168 times with the Swedish national team, winning the world title in 1962 and finishing second in 1963, 1967, 1969 and 1970.

Johansson never won a Swedish title, but in 1964 he received the Goldpucken Award as the best Swedish player and was selected to the Swedish all-star team. In 1971 he was awarded the Rinkens riddare award, given to the most sportsmanlike player of the Swedish Hockey League. After retiring from competitions he worked as a coach with Färjestads BK, Hanhals IF and IF Mölndal Hockey.
