= Alexander Leandersson =

Swedish ice hockey player (1997-)

- Born: 24 June 1997 (age 28) Sundsvall, Sweden
- Height: 6 ft 4 in (193 cm)
- Weight: 212 lb (96 kg; 15 st 2 lb)
- Position: Defense
- Shoots: Left
- Allsv team Former teams: BIK Karlskoga; Färjestad BK
- Playing career: 2015–present

Alexander Leandersson (born 24 June 1997) is a Swedish professional ice hockey player. He is currently playing with BIK Karlskoga of the HockeyAllsvenskan (Allsv).

== Playing career ==
Leandersson participated in the 2012 TV-pucken, playing for Värmland. He appeared in eight games throughout the tournament and recorded one point. He played the rest of the 2012–13 season in BIK Karlskoga J18 team. He moved to Färjestad BK the following season, where he played in Färjestad BK's J18 team. Leandersson was promoted to the J20 team for the 2014–15 season. The team made it to the playoffs but were defeated in the quarterfinals. In 2015–16, Leandersson made his SHL debut with Färjestad BK.

== Career statistics ==
			Regular season					Playoffs
Season	Team	League	GP	G	A	Pts	PIM	GP	G	A	Pts	PIM
2014–15	Färjestad BK	J20	40	0	12	12	4	6	0	0	0	2
2015–16	Färjestad BK	J20	44	3	7	10	10	5	0	0	0	0
2015–16	Färjestad BK	SHL	1	0	0	0	6	—	—	—	—	—
2016–17	Färjestad BK	J20	34	5	15	20	6	—	—	—	—	—
2016–17	Färjestad BK	SHL	5	0	0	0	0	7	0	0	0	0
2016–17	Vimmerby HC	Div.1	4	0	1	1	0	—	—	—	—	—
2017–18	Färjestad BK	J20	3	0	2	2	0	—	—	—	—	—
2017–18	Färjestad BK	SHL	4	0	0	0	0	—	—	—	—	—
2017–18	Forshaga IF	Div.1	2	0	1	1	2	—	—	—	—	—
2017–18	BIK Karlskoga	Allsv	29	0	3	3	2	—	—	—	—	—
2017–18	HC Vita Hästen	Allsv	12	0	2	2	0	—	—	—	—	—
2018–19	BIK Karlskoga	Allsv	50	3	6	9	2	4	0	0	0	0
SHL totals			10	0	0	0	0	7	0	0	0	0
