= Robert Carlsson =

Swedish ice hockey player (born 1974)

- Born: July 2, 1974 (age 51) Uppsala, Sweden
- Height: 6 ft 0 in (183 cm)
- Weight: 188 lb (85 kg; 13 st 6 lb)
- Position: Left wing/Centre
- Shot: Left
- Played for: Timrå IK
- Playing career: 1992–2008

Robert Carlsson (born July 2, 1974 in Uppsala, Sweden) is a retired ice hockey forward who played eleven seasons for the Timrå IK, the last eight of them in the Swedish Elitserien league.

== Playing career ==
As a junior player, Carlsson began playing for his hometown club Uppsala AIS during the 1992-93 season. The team, later known as Almtuna IS, was struggling in the third/second-level league Division 1 and rarely qualified for play in the second-level Allsvenskan (which still was the spring part of the league at the time). He stayed with the club for six seasons.

After having failed at the NHL drafts, in 1997 Robert moved to the slightly more promising Timrå IK of a neighbouring division in the same league. The struggle continued at first, but at the end of his third season with the team Carlsson helped Timrå win promotion to Elitserien in 2000.

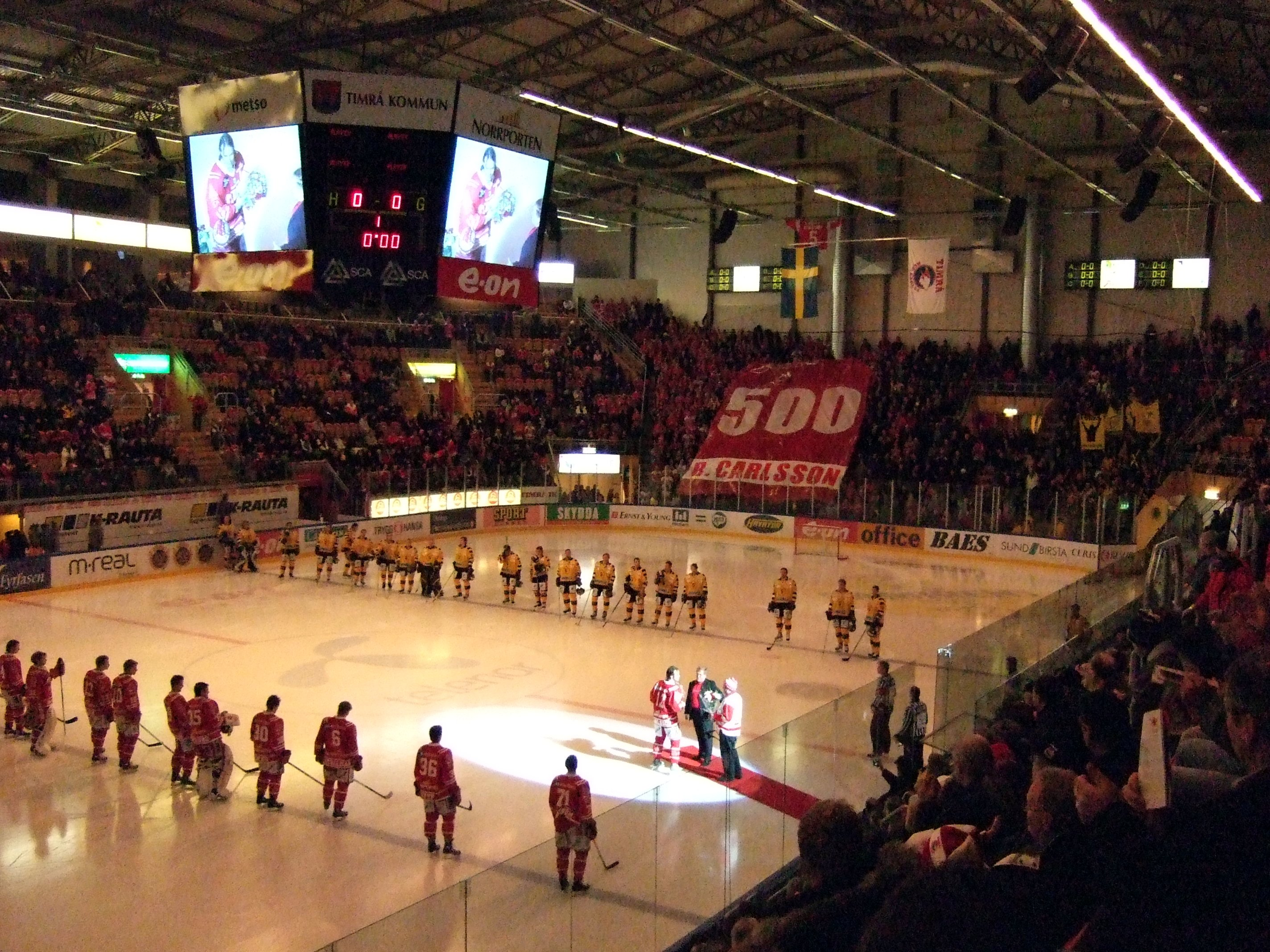
Celebrating 500th game in 2007

On December 6, 2005 Robert Carlsson set the new club record of total games played with 452 in a game against Färjestads BK. The following season he also became the first player to reach 500 games with Timrå IK, which happened on January 27, 2007 while facing Skellefteå AIK.

Aged 33, Robert announced his retirement on March 7, 2008 at the end of his eleventh season with Timrå IK.

== Career statistics ==
			Regular season					Playoffs
Season	Team	League	GP	G	A	Pts	PIM	GP	G	A	Pts	PIM
1991–92	Uppsala AIS	Division 1	7	1	3	4	2	—	—	—	—	—
1992–93	Uppsala AIS	Division 1	31	13	5	18	10	—	—	—	—	—
1993–94	Uppsala AIS	Division 1	31	12	10	22	26	3	3	1	4	2
1994–95	Uppsala AIS	Division 1	32	12	23	35	32	—	—	—	—	—
1995–96	Uppsala AIS	Division 1	32	16	16	32	22	—	—	—	—	—
1996–97	Uppsala AIS	Division 1	27	15	9	24	16	2	1	0	1	12
1997–98	Timrå IK	Division 1	26	8	8	16	19	14	4	2	6	12
1998–99	Timrå IK	Division 1	42	21	17	38	22	4	0	0	0	2
1999–00	Timrå IK	Allsvenskan	46	16	13	29	28	10	3	3	6	0
2000–01	Timrå IK	Elitserien	50	17	13	30	16	—	—	—	—	—
2001–02	Timrå IK	Elitserien	49	7	9	16	12	—	—	—	—	—
2002–03	Timrå IK	Elitserien	46	15	14	29	24	10	1	2	3	6
2003–04	Timrå IK	Elitserien	50	17	9	26	16	10	1	1	2	2
2004–05	Timrå IK	Elitserien	50	9	10	19	18	7	1	0	1	4
2005–06	Timrå IK	Elitserien	49	11	5	16	22	—	—	—	—	—
2006–07	Timrå IK	Elitserien	37	2	10	12	34	7	0	2	2	2
2007–08	Timrå IK J20	J20 SuperElit	1	1	0	1	0	—	—	—	—	—
2007–08	Timrå IK	Elitserien	42	4	3	7	16	4	0	0	0	0
Elitserien totals			373	82	73	155	158	38	3	3	6	14
Allsvenskan totals			46	16	13	29	28	10	3	3	6	0
Division 1 totals			228	98	91	189	149	23	8	3	11	28
