= Timrå IK =

- City: Timrå, Sweden
- League: Swedish Hockey League
- Founded: 11 May 1928; 98 years ago
- Home arena: Timrå Isstadion (Capacity: 6,000)
- Colours
- General manager: Kent Norberg
- Head coach: Mikael Gath
- Captain: Anton Lander
- Website: timraik.se
Home colours	Away colours

Franchise history
- 1928–1942: Wifstavarvs IK
- 1942–1963: Wifsta/Östrands IF
- 1963–1966: Wifsta/Östrand–Fagerviks IF
- 1966–1990: Timrå IK
- 1990–1994: Sundsvall/Timrå Hockey
- 1994–1995: ST Hockey
- 1995–present: Timrå IK

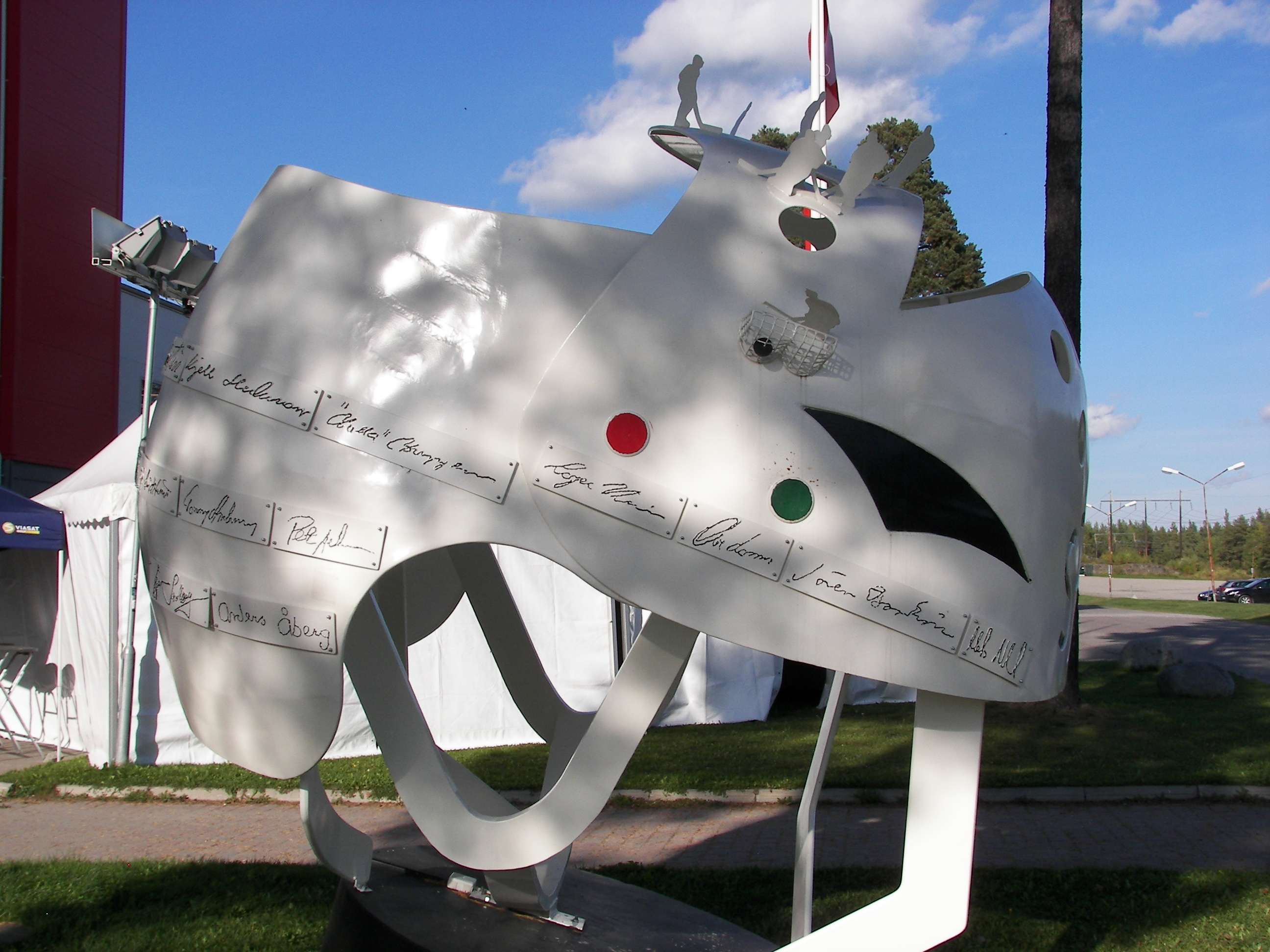
Artwork consisting of a helmet outside Timrå Isstadion.

Timrå Ishockeyklubb is a professional Swedish ice hockey team based in Timrå, north of Sundsvall. It competes in the Swedish Hockey League (SHL), which is the top-tier league in Sweden, since being promoted by winning 2021 SHL qualifiers. Previous seasons in the top Swedish division include 1956–57 to 1975–76, 1977–78, 1981–82, 2000–01 to 2012–13 and 2018–19. The team's home venue is Timrå Isstadion with a capacity of 6,000 spectators.

The club was founded on 11 May 1928 as a boxing club and started the ice hockey section in 1937. Timrå are historically traditional rivals with Modo Hockey since they both are situated in Västernorrland County and are playing in the professional ice hockey leagues in Sweden.

== History ==
The club origins from Wifstavarfs GIF, founded in 1921, later relaunched as Wifstavarvs IK, in 1928, and Östrands IF, founded in 1931. Both clubs started playing ice hockey in 1938 and in the summer of 1942 they merged into Wifsta/Östrands IF, more commonly called W/Ö. W/Ö made its first Swedish Championship appearance in 1943. The championships were played independently from the national league at the time.

Five seasons later, 1948–49 the team was accepted for play in the national league system in Sweden. Starting in third league, Wifsta/Östrands IF won nine out of ten games and directly advanced to second league or Division II Norra (North Division).

In the spring of 1956, having spent seven seasons facing teams like Brynäs IF, Mora IK and Leksands IF, W/Ö qualified for the top national league on 10 March 1956 as the top league, Division I, nicknamed Allsvenskan by many, was expanded from 6+6 to 8+8 teams, a North and South Division.

In 1963, the local club Fagerviks GF was absorbed and W/Ö was renamed Wifsta/Östrand–Fagerviks IF or simply WÖF.

Starting with the 1958–59 season, W/Ö was playing its home games on an artificial ice rink. Some years later an ice arena was built, and WÖF played its first indoor season 1965–66 under the roof of what is now NHK Arena. Just one year later, the lengthy name Wifsta/Östrand–Fagerviks IF was finally replaced by Timrå IK as of 1966–67.

Timrå IK continued to play successful hockey and stayed in the top league in Sweden until Elitserien was formed in 1975. Having finished last of the 10 teams, the club received their first relegation and was demoted after 20 years in the top league. Back in second league for the 1976–77 season, Timrå stood undefeated in all 22 games and qualified for promotion again. However, it did not last. Two one-year visits in Elitserien 1977–78 and 1981–82 ended in low results and relegation.

Many winters later, still in second league, an effort to regain the status of old times was made. On 22 May 1990, the collaboration Sundsvall/Timrå Hockey was formed with the nearby club IF Sundsvall Hockey. Still no success, and just a few years after, the joint main/farm team relationship was ended.

Some confusion followed when the former Timrå club was named ST Hockey during the 1994–95 season, but is since 6 April 1995 known as Timrå IK yet again.

After qualifying for the Kvalserien in 2000, the Red Eagles finally earned promotion to Elitserien on 14 April 2000, and returned to Elitserien after 18 years of absence. Almost three years later, 1 March 2003, Timrå IK played the Swedish Championship playoffs for the first time since 1974.

In the 2007–08 season Timrå IK moved up Anton Lander and Magnus Pääjärvi-Svensson from the junior teams. Despite both being only 16 years old at the time, their game was a success. They were both offered, and signed, professional hockey contracts with the club.

In the 2012–13 season, Timrå finished eleventh in the regular season and therefore had to play in the 2013 Kvalserien to stay in the top-tier league, but the team finished outside the top two spots and was relegated to the second-tier league HockeyAllsvenskan for the first time since the 1999–2000 season.

After playing five seasons in HockeyAllsvenskan, Timrå were able to earn a promotion to the SHL following the conclusion of the 2017–18 HockeyAllsvenskan season. Some of the key players during the season and the subsequent promotion playoffs were Jonathan Dahlén, Vilmos Galló, Anton Wedin and goaltender Henrik Haukeland.

== Crest evolution ==
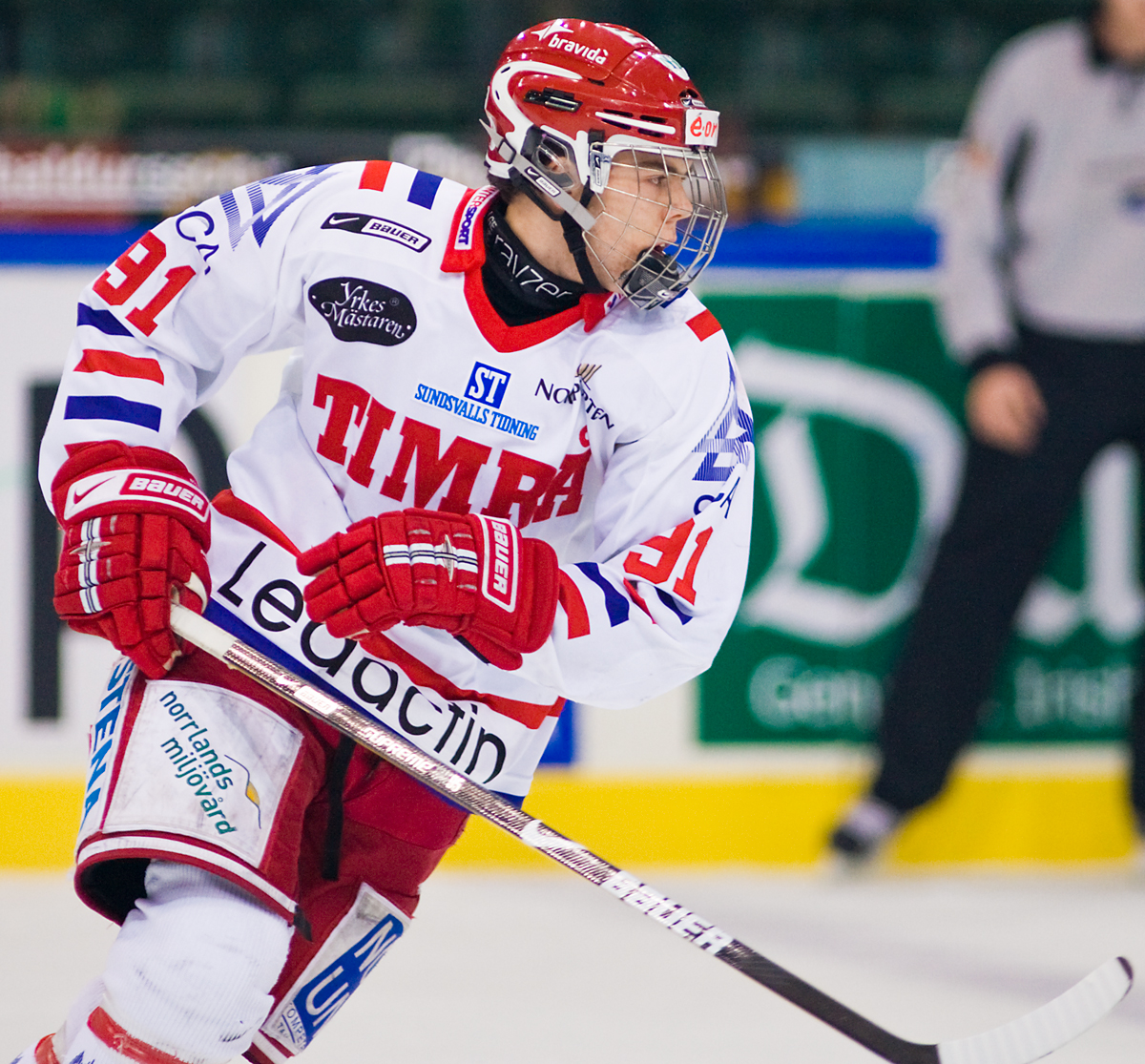
Magnus Pääjärvi-Svensson in Timrå IK's away jersey

The crest of Timrå IK consists of a shield with two pines with the text Timrå IK spelled out in sky-blue letters at the bottom. Present shield is a contemporary interpretation of Timrå IK's earlier shields and made its debut for the 2012–13 season when it replaced the earlier Timrå Red Eagles shield which had been in used since season 1996–97. The current logo resembles the shield of Timrå Municipality along with Västernorrland County and has a strong local connection.

In the original shield the abbreviation of the club "WIK" (Wifstavarvs IK) is spelled out and the clubs year of inception spelled in the right corner. During the fusion with IF Sundsvall Hockey they jointly played under the name "Sundsvall Timrå Hockey" (ST Hockey) and which crest beard little resemblance to Timrå IK's former shields.

== Average attendances ==
The table below show Timrå IK's attendances for the latest seasons in both the SHL and HockeyAllsvenskan during regular season.

Season	Stadium	Capacity	Total	Average	Occupancy	League
2020–21	SCA Arena	6,000	1,158	45	0.8%	Allsv
2021–22	SCA Arena	6,000	91,502	3,519	58.6%	SHL
2022–23	SCA Arena	6,000	130,441	5,017	83.6%	SHL
2023–24	SCA Arena	6,000	128,352	4,937	82.3%	SHL
2024–25	SCA Arena	6,000	134,245	5,163	86.0%	SHL

== Season-by-season results ==
This is a partial list of the last five seasons completed by Timrå IK. For the full season-by-season history, see List of Timrå IK seasons.

Season	League	GP	W	OTW	OTL	L	Pts	GF	GA	Finish	Playoffs
2020–21	Allsv	52	36	4	2	10	118	199	101	1st	Won in Hockeyallsvenskan Final, 4–1 (IF Björklöven); Promoted to SHL
2021–22	SHL	52	14	5	4	29	56	133	177	14th	Won in Play Out, 4–0 (Djurgårdens IF)
2022–23	SHL	52	22	6	3	21	81	137	130	5th, SHL	Lost in Quarterfinals, 3–4 (Örebro HK)
2023–24	SHL	52	22	3	8	19	80	133	137	8th, SHL	Lost in Eighth finals, 0–2 (Rögle BK)
2024–25	SHL	52	23	4	4	21	81	143	127	6th, SHL	Lost in Quarterfinals, 2–4 (Frölunda HC)

== Players and personnel ==
=== Current roster ===
Updated: 28 July 2025.

No.	Nat	Player	Pos	S/G	Age	Acquired	Birthplace
23	(Sweden)	Jeremy Boyce	C	L	33	2010	Stockholm, Sweden
54	(Sweden)	Jonathan Dahlén (A)	LW	L	28	2022	Östersund, Sweden
12	(Sweden)	Linus Eriksson	C	L	20	2025	Stockholm, Sweden
4	(Sweden)	Tim Erixon	D	L	35	2021	Port Chester, New York, United States
28	(Sweden)	Simon Forsmark	D	L	22	2022	Kumla, Sweden
34	(Sweden)	Alfons Freij	D	L	20	2025	Sölvesborg, Sweden
18	(Sweden)	Eddie Genborg	LW	L	19	2025	Trollhättan, Sweden
7	(Sweden)	Marcus Hardegård	D	L	29	2025	Älvsbyn, Sweden
94	(Sweden)	Sebastian Hartmann	RW	R	32	2019	Uppsala, Sweden
26	(Sweden)	Anton Heikkinen	LW	L	26	2025	Nässjö, Sweden
30	(Sweden)	Jacob Johansson	G	L	33	2020	Stockholm, Sweden
31	(Sweden)	Tim Juel	G	L	32	2023	Svenstavik, Sweden
33	(Finland)	Ilari Kapanen	D	L	19	2024	Sundsvall, Sweden
51	(Sweden)	Anton Lander (C)	C	L	35	2022	Sundsvall, Sweden
27	(Sweden)	Ludvig Levinsson	C	L	25	2025	Härryda, Sweden
10	(Sweden)	David Lilja	LW	L	26	2025	Karlskoga, Sweden
25	(Sweden)	Linus Nässén	D	L	28	2024	Norrtälje, Sweden
14	(Sweden)	Emil Pettersson	C	L	32	2022	Sundsvall, Sweden
16	(Sweden)	Lukas Pilö	D	R	27	2024	Eskilstuna, Sweden
91	(Sweden)	Magnus Pääjärvi	LW	L	35	2022	Norrköping, Sweden
74	(Sweden)	Emil Stadin	D	L	20	2025	Sundsvall, Sweden
9	(Sweden)	Didrik Strömberg (A)	D	L	32	2021	Sundsvall, Sweden
38	(Sweden)	Albin Sundin	D	R	22	2025	Kungsbacka, Sweden
2	(Sweden)	Per Svensson	D	L	37	2020	Oskarshamn, Sweden
24	(Sweden)	Erik Walli-Walterholm	LW	L	27	2020	Stockholm, Sweden
57	(Sweden)	Anton Wedin	LW	L	33	2022	Sundsvall, Sweden
19	(Sweden)	Marcus Westfält	C	L	26	2025	Stockholm, Sweden

=== Honored members ===
Timrå IK retired numbers
No.	Player	Position	Career
5	Lennart Svedberg	D	1959–62, 1969–72
8	Eje Lindström	D	1953–60
11	Bert-Ola Nordlander	D	1956–63
20	Henrik Zetterberg	C	1997–2002, 2004–05
24	Mats Näslund	LW	1975–78

=== Team captains ===
- Anders Huss (1999–2001)
- Timo Peltomaa & Marcus Karlsson (2001–2002)
- Håkan Åhlund (2001–2002)
- Markus Åkerblom (2002–2003)
- Robert Carlsson (2003–2005)
- Sanny Lindström (2005–2008)
- Pär Styf (2008–2011)
- Elias Granath (2011–2012)
- Per Hallin (2012–2016)
- Andreas Molinder (2016–2017)
- Hampus Larsson (2017–2019)
- Emil Berglund (2019–2020)
- Jonathan Dahlén (2020–2021)
- Jacob Blomqvist (2021–2022)
- Anton Lander (2022–present)

=== Head coaches ===
- Stig Andersson (1956–1962)
- Orvar Kempe (1962–1964)
- Sven Lindström (1964–1967)
- Verner Persson & Göte Viklund (1967–1968)
- Roine Björkstrand (1968–1970)
- Eje Lindström (1970–1976)
- Jan-Erik Nilsson (1976–1978)
- Håkan Nygren (1978–1980)
- Olle Åhman (1980–1983)
- Björn Pettersson & Christer Sehlstedt (1983–1984)
- Håkan Pettersson & Ulf Backlund (1984–1985)
- Håkan Pettersson & Christer Sehlstedt (1985–1986)
- Rolf Norrbom (1986–1987)
- Steven Brown (1987–1988)
- Lage Edin (1988–1989)
- Ulf Weinstock & Peter Crone (1989–1990)
- Ulf Weinstock & Sune Bergman (1990–1991)
- Ulf Weinstock & Lars-Eje Lindström (1991–1992)
- Juhani Tamminen & Magnus Billman (1992–1993)
- Ulf Thors & Magnus Billman (1993–1994)
- Lars-Eje Lindström (1994–1998)
- Peo Larsson (1998–2002)
- Lars Molin (2002)
- Kent Johansson (2002–2007)
- Charles Berglund (2007–2010)
- Per-Erik Johnsson (2010–2011)
- Kent Norberg (2011–2012)
- Tomas Montén (2012–2013)
- Rolf Nilsson (2013–2014)
- Roger Forsberg (2014–2017)
- Fredrik Andersson (2017–2022)
- Anders "Ante" Karlsson (2019–2024)
- Olli Jokinen (2024–present)
