= Modo Hockey =

Ice hockey club in Örnsköldsvik, Sweden

MoDo Hockey
- City: Örnsköldsvik, Sweden
- League: HockeyAllsvenskan
- Founded: 27 March 1921
- Home arena: Hägglunds Arena (capacity: 7,265)
- Colors: Red, white, green
- General manager: Henrik Gradin
- Head coach: Mattias Karlin
- Captain: David Rundblad
- Website: modohockey.se

Franchise history
- 1921–1963: Alfredshems IK
- 1964–86: MoDo AIK
- 1987–present: MoDo Hockey

Championships
- Le Mat Trophy: (1979, 2007)

Modo Hockey (or MoDo Hockey with uppercase letters) is a professional ice hockey club in Örnsköldsvik, Sweden. The team currently plays in Sweden's second-tier league HockeyAllsvenskan after losing to HV71 after the play out following the 2024–25 season. The club was founded in 1921 and has won two titles, the SHL championships, in 1979 and 2007. The team's home arena since 2006 is the Hägglunds Arena (previously known as Fjällräven Center and Swedbank Arena). Before then, the team played at Kempehallen, beginning in 1964.

== History ==
=== Alfredshems IK and Modo AIK (1921–87) ===
The club was founded on 27 March 1921 as Alfredshems IK, however it existed without an ice hockey program until 1938. Twenty years later, in 1958, the club joined Hockeyallsvenskan, Sweden's highest division at the time. Alfredshems IK played under that name until 1963, when it was renamed Modo AIK after their main sponsor, industrial corporation Mo och Domsjö AB (commonly abbreviated MoDo). The following year, the club made the newly constructed Kempehallen their home arena. In 1975, Modo AIK joined the Elitserien as one of the premier league's original ten teams. Four seasons later, Modo AIK won their first regular-season championship in 1979, en route to defeating previous ten-time champion Djurgårdens IF to also capture their first Le Mat trophy as playoff champions.

=== MoDo Hockey (1987–present) ===
In 1987, Modo AIK dropped the "AIK" suffix to the club's name, becoming known simply as Modo Hockey. After coming off its championship year in 1979, the club spent the majority of the 1980s with losing records. Coming out of the club's junior program, however, hometown stars Peter Forsberg and Markus Näslund played their rookie seasons with the senior team in 1990–91. Näslund went on to lead Modo Hockey in scoring as an eighteen-year-old in his second season with the club, while Forsberg became the first Modo player to win the Guldpucken as Swedish player of the year since Nils Johansson in 1964, capturing the title back-to-back in 1993 and 1994.

With both Forsberg and Näslund having been chosen as first-round selections in the 1991 NHL entry draft, however, their time in Sweden was limited. Näslund departed for the NHL in 1993, while Forsberg remained to lead Modo to their second Elitserien playoff final in 1994, where they lost to Malmö IF. Soon after Forsberg's inevitable departure to the NHL in 1995, identical twin brothers Daniel and Henrik Sedin represented the next wave of young talent coming through the Modo system. At seventeen-years-old, they captured the Guldpucken together as co-recipients in 1999, while leading Modo to a 33-win season (in a 50-game schedule) for the club's second regular-season title. As second- and third-overall selections in the 1999 NHL entry draft, respectively, Daniel and Henrik left Modo for the NHL in 2000. Regardless, Modo became consistent contenders for the Le Mat trophy, appearing in three out of four playoff finals – losing all three – between 1999 and 2002.

Due to the 2004–05 NHL lockout, many former Modo stars returned to the team from the NHL, including Forsberg, Näslund, the Sedins and František Kaberle. Several foreign NHL players also signed with Modo, including Canadian defenceman Adrian Aucoin and American forward Dan Hinote. Swedish goaltender Tommy Salo (a product of VIK Västerås HK) joined as the starting goaltender. Despite a bolstered lineup, Modo finished sixth in the regular season.

Having played in Kempehallen as their home arena since 1964, Modo moved into the then newly constructed Swedbank Arena, which was partially funded by former star Forsberg and his father Kent, who was also a former club head coach. Modo returned to Elitserien supremacy that season, defeating Linköpings HC on April 14, 2007, to capture their second Le Mat trophy in franchise history. The championship-winning club featured the 2007 Guldpucken-recipient Per Svartvadet, team leading-scorer Per-Åge Skrøder and future NHL defenceman Tobias Enström. The return of Niklas Sundström, who had originally played with the club alongside Forsberg and Näslund in the early 1990s, bolstered Modo's roster as he finished second in team scoring in his first season back from the NHL. An approximate 8,000 fans were in attendance at the Swedbank Arena for Modo's first championship in 28 years.

In the 2008–09 season the team finished ninth in Elitserien, thus missing the playoffs. In the 2009–10 season, Forsberg returned to play for Modo on a conditioning-basis to prepare for an anticipated return to the NHL after having been inactive for a season due to injury. With Näslund back in Sweden, having retired after the 2008–09 NHL season, he correctly predicted that Forsberg would not return to the NHL and finish the season with Modo instead. Several days later, on November 17, 2009, Näslund announced he was coming out of retirement to also rejoin Modo with Forsberg. The announcement crashed the Modo web server as a result of the heavy volume of people visiting the site. As a board member of the club, Näslund also announced he would play without a salary, along with Forsberg. Despite Näslund's and Forsberg's return to Modo, the team finished ninth and thus missed the playoffs for the second consecutive year. After the 2009–10 season, Näslund retired again, and Forsberg left Modo again. After Näslund's second retirement, he was named the general manager of Modo.

In the 2010–11 season the team were closer to relegation to HockeyAllsvenskan than since 1990. The team finished last in Elitserien after a very tight battle in the bottom of Elitserien and thus were forced to play in Kvalserien for the first time since 1990 (the team survived the 1990 Kvalserien). After the 2011 Kvalserien's ninth round, Modo and Södertälje both had 17 points. Modo and Södertälje met each other in Fjällräven Center in the final round, for a game that directly decided which team would be relegated to HockeyAllsvenskan. Modo won the game 2–0 and thus stayed in Elitserien for the 2011–12 season. Nearly two weeks later, Peter Forsberg was named an assistant general manager of the Modo organization. Just a day later, on April 21, 2011, Modo Hockey's then head coach Charles "Challe" Berglund was forced to leave the club.

On May 2, 2011, Ulf Samuelsson, who had been an assistant coach in the National Hockey League (NHL), was named the head coach of Modo Hockey, a position he held for two seasons.

== Women's team ==
During the 2012–13 Riksserien season, Modo finished first in the regular season, but were eliminated in the semifinals by Brynäs IF.

== NHL alumni ==
Although Örnsköldsvik is a small town with an approximate population of just 29,000, the city has produced numerous born-and-raised NHL talents through the Modo system. The hockey-centred town has six indoor rinks, with the Hägglunds Arena boasting regular attendances of 7,000 for Modo home games, marking nearly a quarter of the population.

Anders Hedberg was one of the first Swedes to succeed in the NHL, in the 1970s. In the early 1990s, forwards Peter Forsberg and Markus Näslund emerged from Modo's junior system and were drafted 6th and 16th overall by the Philadelphia Flyers and Pittsburgh Penguins, respectively in the 1991 NHL entry draft. They became arguably Modo's first NHL stars. Forsberg went on to win the Calder Memorial Trophy as NHL rookie of the year in 1995 with the Nordiques and the Hart Memorial Trophy as NHL MVP with the Colorado Avalanche in 2003, while Näslund won the Lester B. Pearson Award as NHL MVP chosen by the players in 2003. Furthermore, Forsberg and Näslund finished first and second in league point-scoring for the Art Ross Trophy in 2003. Besides the two league-leaders, the 2002–03 season featured 13 NHL players originating from Modo, as well as seven others who were born and raised within a couple miles of Örnsköldsvik. Forward Niklas Sundström also played alongside Forsberg and Näslund with Modo and was drafted 8th overall in the 1993 NHL entry draft by the New York Rangers.

Eight years after Forsberg and Näslund's draft selections, identical twins Daniel and Henrik Sedin were drafted second and third overall, joining Näslund in Vancouver. In 2005–06, Näslund, Henrik and Daniel finished first, second and third, respectively, in Canucks team-scoring. In fact, from the 1998–99 season until the 2016-17 season, no Canucks player has led the team in scoring besides either Näslund, Henrik or Daniel. During the 2009–10 season, Henrik became the second former Modo player to win the NHL's Art Ross Trophy as the league's leading scorer and the Hart Memorial Trophy as league MVP. The next year fellow Canuck and twin brother Daniel Sedin would go on to win the Art ross trophy making it the first time in NHL history that two brothers won scoring titles consecutively.

In 2008–09 defenceman Victor Hedman began drawing considerable attention from the NHL and was eventually selected second overall in the 2009 NHL entry draft by the Tampa Bay Lightning, matching Daniel Sedin as the highest-drafted Modo player in team history.

Victor Olofsson found success with the Buffalo Sabres upon joining the team in 2019, becoming a member of the team in the 2019–20 season. Olofsson has since joined the Calgary Flames hockey team, and scored his first NHL hat trick on October 28, 2025 in a home win over the New Jersey Devils while he was playing with the Colorado Avalanche.

== Season-by-season results ==
This is a partial list of the last nine seasons completed by Modo. For the full season-by-season history, see List of Modo Hockey seasons. Code explanation; GP—Games played, W—Wins, L—Losses, T—Tied games, GF—Goals for, GA—Goals against, Pts—Points. Top Scorer: Points (Goals+Assists)

Season	League	Regular season									Post season results
Season	League	Finish	GP	W	L	T	GF	GA	Pts	Top scorer	Post season results
2009–10	Elitserien	9th	55	16	20	19	161	150	74	(Norway) M. Zuccarello 64 (23+41)	Did not qualify
2010–11	Elitserien	12th	55	17	25	13	147	153	70	(Canada) B. Ritchie 44 (23+21)	Saved in relegation series (Kvalserien)
2011–12	Elitserien	8th	55	19	22	6	146	147	79	(Sweden) N. Danielsson 53 (21+31)	Lost in quarterfinals, 2–4 (Skellefteå AIK)
2012–13	Elitserien	7th	55	19	19	17	135	129	81	(Norway) P.Å. Skröder 35 (16+19)	Lost in quarterfinals, 1–4 (Färjestad BK)
2013–14	SHL	8th	55	18	20	17	131	132	81	(Canada) K. Cumiskey 28 (4+24)	Lost in play in, 0–2 (Linköpings HC)
2014–15	SHL	12th	55	12	30	13	127	176	53	(Norway) P.Å. Skröder 25 (14+11)	Saved in relegation series (SHL qualifiers)
2015–16	SHL	13th	52	13	32	7	119	166	49	(Sweden) V. Olofsson 29 (14+15)	Relegated, lost play-out series 3–4 (Leksands IF)
2016–17	HockeyAllsvenskan	12th	52	16	25	11	133	155	66	(Sweden) H. Björklund 39 (20+19)	Did not qualify
2017–18	HockeyAllsvenskan	10th	52	19	25	8	134	123	72	(Sweden) E. Molin 51 (23+28)	Did not qualify
2018–19	HockeyAllsvenskan	6th	52	24	18	10	143	134	86	(Sweden) P. Karlkvist 42 (20+22)	4th in the playoff series
2019–20	HockeyAllsvenskan	2nd	52	35	12	5	205	130	111	(Sweden) J. Johnson 79 (29+50)	Hockeyallsvenskan Final, (IF Björklöven)
2020–21	HockeyAllsvenskan	12th	52	15	25	12	150	185	63	(Sweden) P. Karlkvist 45 (19+26)	Did not qualify
2021–22	HockeyAllsvenskan	2nd	52	26	10	16	182	140	106	(Canada) R. Woods 49 (26+23)	Lost in semifinals, 3–4 (IF Björklöven)
2022–23	HockeyAllsvenskan	1st	52	31	9	12	178	124	109	(Sweden) D. Bernhardt 51 (19+32)	Promoted, Win in finals 4–3 (Djurgårdens IF)
2023–24	SHL	11th	52	15	23	14	130	162	67	(Canada) R. Woods 36 (15+21)	Did not qualify
2024–25	SHL	13th	52	16	24	12	135	170	63	(Denmark) M. Aagaard 33 (19+14)	Relegated, lost play-out series 2-4 (HV71)

== Players ==
=== Current roster ===
Updated 1 August 2025.

No.	Nat	Player	Pos	S/G	Age	Acquired	Birthplace
91	(Sweden)	Linus Andersson	RW	R	27	2025	Arvidsjaur, Sweden
64	(Sweden)	Jacob Bengtsson	D	L	27	2025	Stockholm, Sweden
51	(Sweden)	Victor Berglund	D	R	27	2024	Örnsköldsvik, Sweden
15	(Sweden)	Jacob Bjerselius	C	L	28	2025	Vendelsö, Sweden
22	(Sweden)	Måns Carlsson	C	L	29	2024	Lysekil, Sweden
38	(Sweden)	William Falkenhäll	F	L	21	2025	Vallentuna, Sweden
10	(Canada)	Gerry Fitzgerald	C	R	33	2025	Port Alberni, British Columbia, Canada
20	(Sweden)	Milton Gästrin	C	L	19	2024	Örnsköldsvik, Sweden
34	(Sweden)	Hugo Hallin	D	L	19	2024	Örnsköldsvik, Sweden
19	(United States)	Tyler Kelleher	RW	R	31	2025	Longmeadow, Massachusetts, United States
26	(Sweden)	Emil Larsson	LW	L	33	2025	Lugano, Switzerland
25	(Sweden)	Carl Mattsson	C	L	27	2025	Gammelstad, Sweden
14	(Sweden)	Jakob Norén	D	L	22	2021	Själevad, Sweden
36	(Sweden)	Sebastian Ohlsson (A)	W	L	29	2020	Åsele, Sweden
60	(Sweden)	Edvin Olofsson	G	L	28	2025	Lidköping, Sweden
92	(Sweden)	Jesper Olofsson (A)	W	L	34	2024	Örnsköldsvik, Sweden
37	(Sweden)	Viktor Persson	D	R	24	2025	Hedesunda, Sweden
12	(Sweden)	Oscar Pettersson	LW	R	27	2021	Örnsköldsvik, Sweden
55	(Norway)	Sverre Rønningen	D	L	25	2025	Lillehammer, Norway
2	(Sweden)	David Rundblad (C)	D	R	35	2023	Lycksele, Sweden
33	(Sweden)	Oliver Svensson	D	L	20	2024	Härnösand, Sweden
90	(Canada)	Alex Swetlikoff	C	L	25	2025	Kelowna, British Columbia, Canada
24	(Canada)	Kyle Topping	C	L	26	2025	Ganges, British Columbia, Canada
35	(Sweden)	Adam Werner	G	L	29	2025	Mariestad, Sweden

=== Retired numbers ===
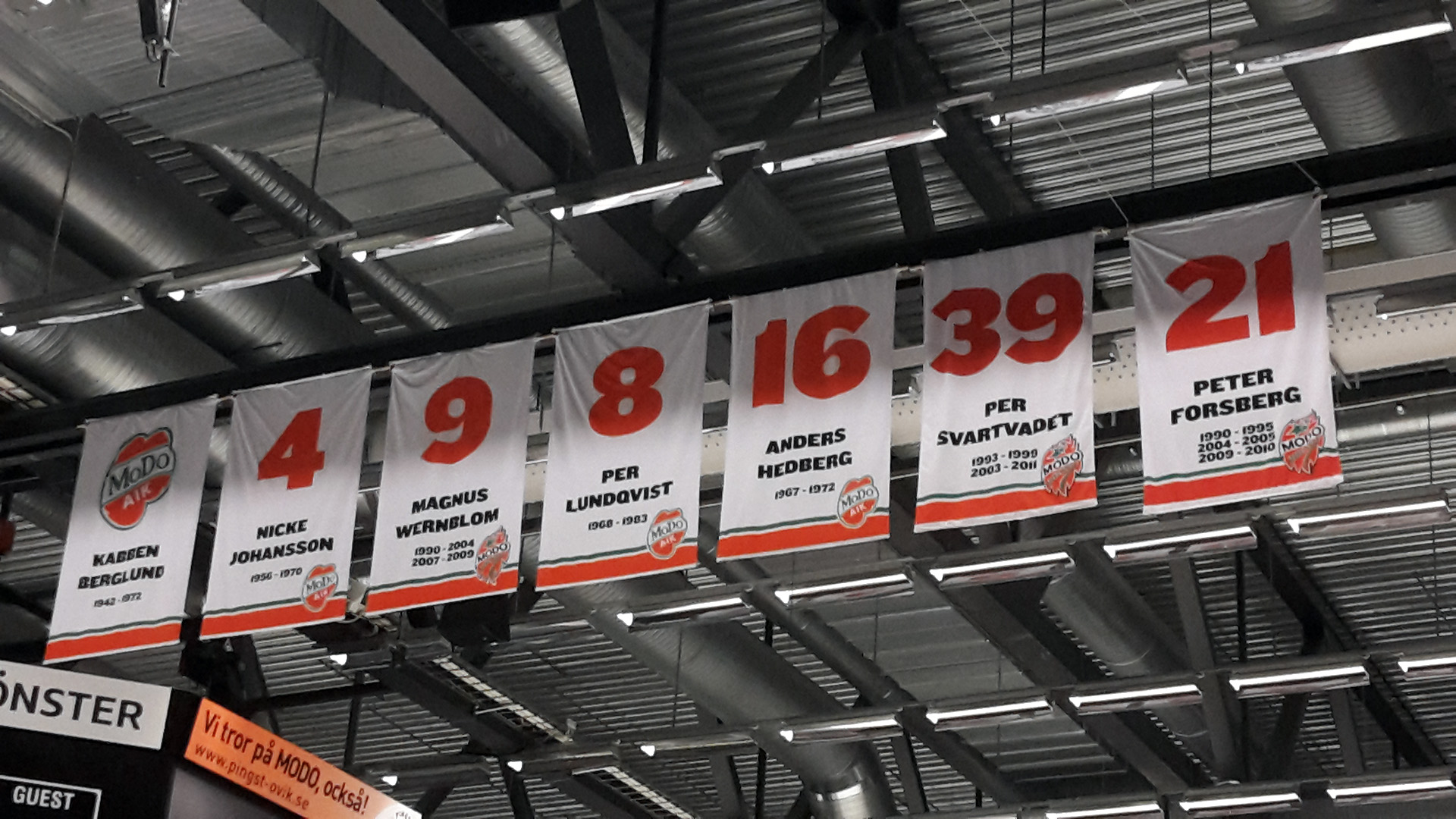
Banners of retired numbers at Hägglunds Arena

Modo Hockey retired numbers
No.	Player	Position	Career
3	Mattias Timander	D	1993–1996, 2004–2011
4	Nils Johansson	D	1958–1970
8	Per Lundqvist	LW	1968–1983
9	Magnus Wernblom	RW	1990–2004, 2007–2009
16	Anders Hedberg	RW	1967–1972
21	Peter Forsberg	C	1990–1995, 2004–2005, 2009–2010
39	Per Svartvadet	C	1992–1999, 2003–2011

=== Notable players ===
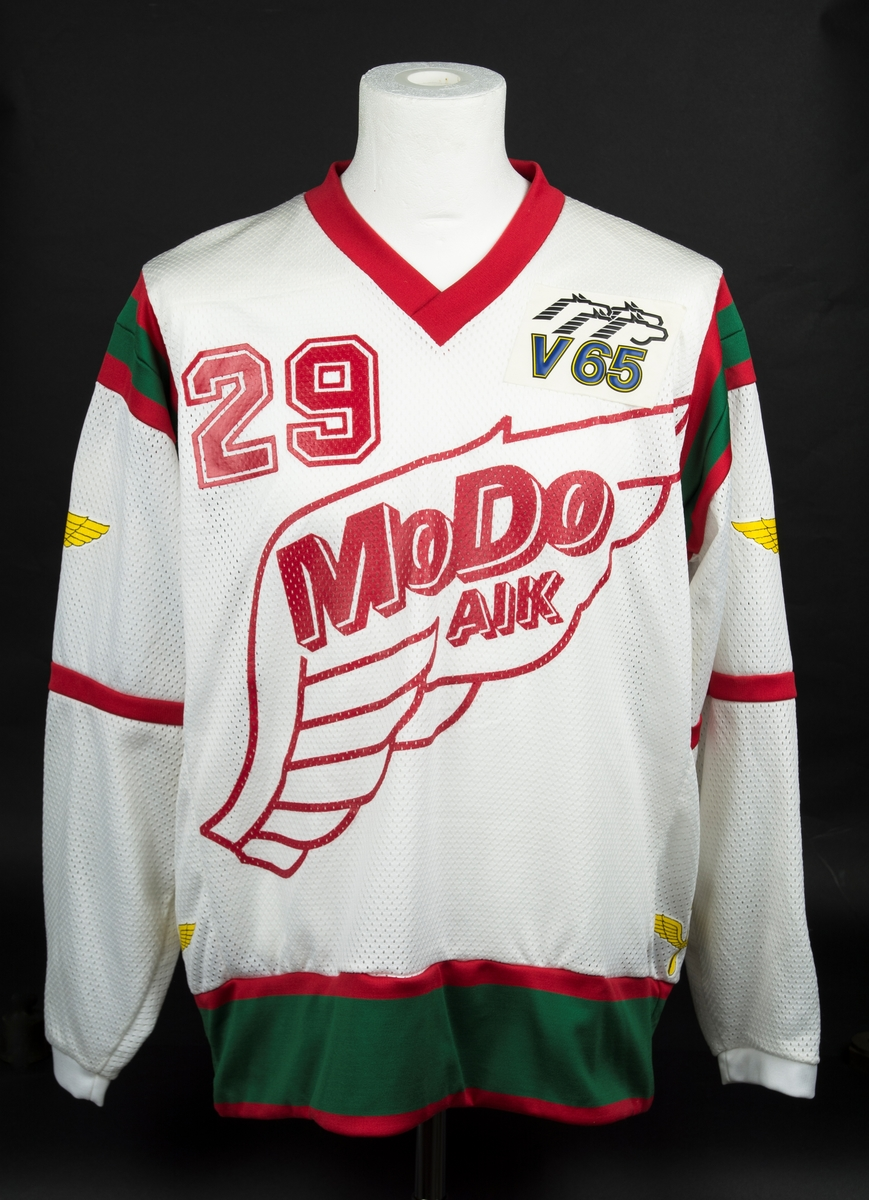
MoDo AIK jersey from 1979–80 Elitserien season

- František Kaberle
- Victor Olofsson
- Kristian Kuusela
- Mattias Timander
- Per-Åge Skrøder
- Alexander Steen
- Justin Morrison
- Victor Hedman
- Mikael Tellqvist
- David Výborný
- Martin Hosták
- William Nylander
- Adrian Aucoin
- Donald Brashear
- Markus Näslund
- Peter Forsberg
- Samuel Påhlsson
- Peter Högardh
- Mattias Weinhandl
- Mats Zuccarello
- Kyle Cumiskey
- Tomas Jonsson
- Mikko Leinonen
- Daniel Sedin
- Henrik Sedin
- Ulf Thors
- Anton Forsberg
- Linus Ullmark
- Adrian Kempe

== Trophies and awards ==
=== Team ===
SHL regular-season titles

- 1979
- 1999

Le Mat Trophy

- 1979
- 2007

=== Individual ===
Guldpucken

- Nils Johansson – 1964
- Peter Forsberg – 1993, 1994
- Daniel Sedin – 1999
- Henrik Sedin – 1999
- Per Svartvadet – 2007

Guldhjälmen

- Peter Forsberg – 1993, 1994
- Mats Zuccarello – 2010

Håkan Loob Trophy

- Peter Högardh – 2002
- Magnus Wernblom – 2003
- Mattias Weinhandl – 2005
- Per-Åge Skrøder – 2009

SHL Rookie of the Year

- Tobias Enström – 2003
- Victor Hedman – 2009

Awards and achievements
Preceded by Skellefteå AIK	Swedish ice hockey champions 1979	Succeeded by Brynäs IF
Preceded by Färjestads BK	Swedish ice hockey champions 2007	Succeeded by HV71
