= Lindner =

Lindner is a German surname. Notable people with the surname include:

- Lindner family, American business family from Ohio
- Lindner (agricultural machinery manufacturer), Austrian family company
- Arlon Lindner (1935–2021), American businessman and politician
- Bob Lindner (born 1962), Australian rugby player
- Carl Lindner (disambiguation), multiple people
- Charles C. Lindner (1938–2023), American mathematician
- Christian Lindner (born 1979), German politician
- Dieter Lindner (racewalker) (1937–2021), German race walker
- Dieter Lindner (footballer) (1939–2024), German football player
- Doris Lindner (1896–1979), British sculptor
- Dörte Lindner (born 1974), German diver
- Ernest Lindner (1897–1988), Austrian/Canadian painter
- Erwin Lindner (1888–1988), German entomologist
- Eugen Lindner (1858–1915), German composer
- Éva Lindner (1926–2016), Hungarian figure skater
- Evelin Lindner (b. 1954), German-Norwegian medical doctor, psychologist, transdisciplinary scholar and author
- Johann Lindner (born 1959), Austrian hammer thrower and bobsledder
- Lin Lindner (born 1994), German politician
- Patrick Lindner (born 1960), German singer
- Richard Lindner (disambiguation), multiple people
- Robert Lindner (1916–1967), Austrian actor
- Robert M. Lindner (1914–1956), American author and psychologist
- Tobias Lindner (born 1982), German politician

== See also ==
- Lintner (disambiguation)
- Lind (disambiguation)
- Linde (disambiguation)
