= Lint =

Lint may refer to:

- Fibrous coat of thick hairs covering the seeds of the cotton plant
- Lint (material), an accumulation of fluffy fibers that collect on fabric

== Places ==
- Lint, Belgium, a municipality located in Antwerp, Belgium
- Linț, a village in Chețani Commune, Mureș County, Romania

== People ==
- Drew Lint (born 1987), Canadian director and screenwriter
- Royce Lint (1921–2006), American baseball player
- Tim Armstrong (b. 1965), nicknamed Lint, a punk rock musician, known from Operation Ivy, Rancid, and Transplants
- De Lint, surname
- Van Lint, surname

== Computing and technology ==
- Lint (software), a tool to analyze and find problems in source code, such as:
  - PC-Lint
- LINT, Line Islands Time, UTC+14:00
- LINT0 and LINT1, LINTX etc. the interrupt lines on x86 microprocessors

== Other uses ==
- Alstom Coradia LINT, light rail vehicle built by Alstom
- Pocket-lint, a UK-based online news and reviews site
- Wikipedia:Linter, a MediaWiki extension that aims to identify "lint"

== See also ==
- Lind (disambiguation)
- Lindt (disambiguation)
- Linter (disambiguation)
- Lent (disambiguation)
- Toe jam (disambiguation)
