= Sandpiper Hill House Windmill =

Replica windmill in New York, 1928–1977

Coordinates: 41°3′22″N 71°52′22″W

The Sandpiper Hill Windmill, constructed in 1928 as part of a Gilded Age mansion, was a Dutch-style windmill replica located on Long Island's South Fork at Ditch Plains in Montauk, New York. After the mansion fell victim to beach erosion, the windmill was purchased and moved by artist and photographer Peter Beard to his property in Montauk. In 1977, an oil-burner explosion led to a fire that destroyed both Beard's home and the windmill, marking the end of the structure's historical presence.

== History ==
The Sandpiper Hill Windmill, a Gilded Age house designed by architect Richard Webb for Walter McCaffray, an affluent stock exchange member, was an ornamental, non-functional structure. The interior featured unique design elements such as a powder room lined with hand-blown pink-glass mirrors and a top-floor library rich with books on Montauk history, indicating the McCaffrays' cultural interests. Decorative wooden statues of a Native American and Captain Kidd stood at each end of the property, symbolizing historical and local lore. Kidd's statue looked out to Gardiner's Island, where he reputedly buried some of his treasure. The house was built while Carl Fisher was promoting Montauk as a summer destination. It was central to the McCaffray family who were instrumental in founding St. Thérèse of Lisieux church of Montauk, where Edgar Grimes was also working. Facing demolition and encroaching erosion by the sea in 1968, the windmill portion was moved in 1973 to become part of a residence further east. The windmill's ultimate fate was sealed in 1977 when a fire, caused by an oil-burner explosion, destroyed it after it had been relocated to a Montauk ranch.

== Camp Wikoff ==
Sandpiper Hill has a significant historical connection with Teddy Roosevelt. It was the Camp Wikoff site where he and his regiments camped upon their return from the Spanish-American War in 1898, when they were under quarantine. The Sandpiper estate was later built on this site, commissioned by McCaffray, a well-to-do stockbroker from Brooklyn and a friend of entrepreneur Carl Fisher.

The narrative takes a tragic turn with McCaffray, who, like many others, suffered greatly after the stock market crash of 1929, some accounts suggesting he jumped to his death. This history paints a vivid picture of the estate's cultural significance, its personal connections to broader historical events, and the dramatic tales that surround it.

After his wife's death, the property was bequeathed to the Jesuits, who used it as a retreat before selling it to the Rheinstein family in 1946. In the 1930s, Edgar Grimes and his wife Cecilia became the caretakers. Cecilia endured the devastating hurricane of 1938, which blew out the windows of the house, forcing her and the children to seek shelter in the garage.

During World War II, in June 1943, Edgar Grimes witnessed the distant glow of naval warfare, as German U-boats attacked Allied ships off the coast. There's a local legend that the wooden statues were destroyed by fire at the hands of local kids.

Former location of Sandpiper Hill House Windmill in Ditch Plains, now part of Rheinstein Estate Park

Sidney and Florence Rheinstein, along with their extended family, enjoyed the estate until it succumbed to significant beach erosion in the 1960s. The front lawn became a 100-foot (30 m) drop to the sea, and the house became unlivable. As a result, portions of the land were gifted to the municipality to facilitate the removal of debris and to create a public pathway to the beach, resulting in "Sidney Rheinstein State Park," known for its surfing. It was subsequently renamed to ‘Rheinstein Estate Park,’ a conservation area, which became a popular surfing spot and home to the 'Ditch Witch' food shack. Serving as a nature reserve it preserves the natural beauty and history of the area, while in close proximity to Ditch Plains and Shadmoor State Park.

Ditch Plains Beach, renowned for its sandy cliffs and perpetual surf, sparked the regional surfing movement in the 1960s and is often compared to the iconic West Coast surf spots of San Onofre and Surfrider. This beach boasts a segment of Californian-esque shoreline sculpted by ancient glaciers at the extremity of Long Island. Greg Donohue, the erosion control director at Montauk Point Lighthouse, notes, "To the west of Hither Hills State Park, it's all dunes. However, the eastern side features a seven-mile expanse of glacial cliffs beginning at Ditch Plains."

Following this, the local government assumed control of the property, and the house was put up for auction under the condition that the windmill be promptly relocated.

== The Beard era ==
Constructed in 1928, the windmill was one of three residential windmills from the nascent days of Montauk's development as a luxury retreat. This development was part of Carl Fisher's vision starting in 1926 to create an exclusive enclave for the successful. Despite the financial ruin Fisher faced due to the Great Depression, he persisted in drawing his affluent acquaintances to Montauk even after the 1929 stock market collapse. His efforts, though costly to him personally, succeeded in drawing numerous business magnates to the area for summer retreats and the construction of fishing lodges along the scenic cliffs.

Locations of the windmill in Montauk

In 1972, renowned photographer Peter Beard bought land for a ranch in Montauk, New York, and acquired the windmill from the Sandpiper Hill House in Ditch Plains. He relocated it to his property. During its renovation, the windmill was hit by lightning, an event which inspired the name Thunderbolt Ranch. Throughout his lifetime, Thunderbolt Ranch became a hub for Beard's circle of writers, musicians, and artists. Beard had salvaged the windmill from the dismantled Sandpiper Hill House for $15,000, giving it a new home on his ranch. Peter Beard, born into New York high society, was the descendant of a railroad magnate on his maternal side and a tobacco fortune on his paternal side. His education spanned Buckley, Pomfret, and Yale. At 17, he ventured to Africa, capturing the experience with a Voigtländer camera gifted by his grandmother. Beard became well known within the global art and social circles. In 1972, he purchased the land in Montauk adjacent to Andy Warhol's estate for approximately $135,000—a property that would now be valued at over $20 million. His photography subjects on this estate included notables such as Truman Capote, Mick Jagger, and Jackie Onassis, whom he captured with his camera skinny dipping. Adjacent to Camp Hero and close to Deep Hollow Ranch in the Montauk Hills, the relocation to Thunderbolt Ranch established it as the easternmost dwelling on the South Fork of Long Island. Beard repurposed the windmill to serve as his living space, darkroom, studio, gallery, office, and storage for his archives. Kevin McCann, a filmmaker, described Thunderbolt Ranch as being unconventional, not focused on rearing livestock but rather famous for assembling a diverse mix of 'human stock'—a social tapestry of notable figures from the celebrity world. This included luminaries from entertainment as well as other distinguished personalities from various sectors such as science, politics, academia, business, culinary arts, and acquaintances he made throughout his journey. In 1981, supermodel Cheryl Tiegs and Peter Beard exchanged vows and the wedding celebration took place at Thunderbolt Ranch.

== The Fire ==
On July 27, 1977, the Montauk mill and Thunderbolt was destroyed by fire, resulting in the loss of two decades' worth of diaries, original artworks (including pieces by Lindner, Warhol, Picasso, among others), as well as first editions of African literature and other rare publications. The estate, home to Mr. Beard and his wife, now boasts a collection of cottages, among them Mr. Beard's studio. The property offers expansive views of the ocean and is situated next to the 754-acre expanse of Camp Hero State Park. Beard's initial residence, situated at the very tip of Long Island's South Fork, was engulfed by flames, caused by a malfunctioning Oil-Burning furnace. The fire consumed art pieces given to him by friends like Francis Bacon and Andy Warhol, both of whom had collaborated with Beard on artworks. Also lost were his elaborate, baroque-style diaries, where Beard had meticulously assembled a collage of photographs, newspaper clippings, comic strips, leaves, matchbooks, naive sketches, doodles, and even cigarette butts. These items were interwoven with scribbled phone numbers, to-do lists, budding manifestos, poems, and spontaneous mantras, all penned in an ornate script reminiscent of the one used in Conrad's "Heart of Darkness." Also gone, the Sandpiper windmill.

Beard has admittedly not maintained his work well over the years; the surviving diaries were deteriorating, and many were lost in the fire at the millhouse. Despite the loss of irreplaceable items, including works by Picasso, Warhol, and Bacon, Beard chose not to wallow in sorrow. "I recall a brief moment of sorrow, just a few seconds to myself," he acknowledges. "But you can either choose to agonize and complain, or completely circumvent that by simply not engaging in it. I sincerely have never dwelled on the past.".

== Sandpiper movie ==
"Montauk: A Playground at the Very Limit of Creation." In 2021 Kevin McCann debuted his pre-production documentary made from super-8 footage of the windmills move to Thunderbolt. The documentary anchors its narrative around the windmill that Beard installed on his property in 1973. It spans the years from 1860 to 1978, initially honing in on Carl Fisher's role in reshaping the village from 1925 to 1935 into what was dubbed the "Miami of the North." Subsequently, it shifts attention to the period Mr. McCann spent at Thunderbolt Ranch, the moniker Beard assigned to his estate after a lightning strike ignited a fire in the windmill during refurbishment.

Signaling this change is the true highlight of the narrative, the Sandpiper Hill Windmill, alternately referred to as the McCaffray and Rheinstein Windmill over time. Beard purchased it in a municipal auction for $15,000 under the condition that it be relocated from its existing site swiftly. Following Beard's acquisition of the windmill, Mr. McCann, then engaged in the contracting business, oversaw its relocation and constructed its base with assistance from his brother and a few friends. A different friend, who later pursued a career in documentary filmmaking, captured the relocation on Super 8 film. This footage has since been digitized and incorporated into Mr. McCann's film. Upon Beard's passing, Mr. McCann started to reflect on the various endeavors from that earlier chapter in his life, which sparked the motivation for the documentary. He remembered gathering extensive historical records of Montauk's formative years and being the sole individual to have photographed each page of the densely annotated albums often termed as Beard's diaries. A significant number of these, as well as many of Mr. McCann's negatives, were lost in the blaze. The narrative thread involving the windmill and its fire served to unify these elements. The blaze destroyed a substantial amount of archival content, yet numerous diaries, negatives, and prints were salvaged. Mr. McCann plans to conclude his documentary in 1978, marking the year he departed from Montauk.

Several others became involved, and for one winter, Mr. McCann's family even resided on the property as part of a seasonal arrangement. Ultimately, the property was sold to the municipality.

== See also ==
- List of windmills in New York
- East Deck Motel Family Resort
- Ditch Witch (food truck)
