= Lynds =

Lynds may refer to:

== People ==
=== As a given name: ===
- Lynds Jones (1865–1951), American naturalist and ornithologist

=== As a surname: ===
- Beverly Turner Lynds (1929–2024), American astronomer
- Dennis Lynds (1924–2005), American author who wrote under the pseudonym of Michael Collins
- Elam Lynds (1784–1855), American prison warden
- Gayle Lynds (born 1945), American former journalist, editor, and author
- Peter Lynds, proposer of a modern solution to Zeno's paradoxes

== Works ==
- Lynds' Catalogue, astronomical catalogues compiled by Beverly Turner Lynds
  - Lynds' Catalogue of Bright Nebulae
  - Lynds' Catalogue of Dark Nebulae

== See also ==
- Lynd
