= Van Lint =

van Lint is a surname. Notable people with the surname include:

- Giacomo van Lint (or Jacob van Lint) (1723–1780), Italian painter
- Hendrik Frans van Lint (1684–1763), Flemish landscape painter
- Jacinta van Lint (born 1978), Australian swimmer
- Jacobus Hendricus van Lint (1932–2004), Dutch mathematician
- Jack van Lint (1932–2004), Dutch academic and mathematician
- Louis Van Lint (1909–1986), Belgian painter
- Pieter van Lint (1609–1690), Flemish history painter
- Theo van Lint (born 1957), Dutch scholar
- Wennie van Lint (born 1948), Australian rules footballer

== See also ==
- De Lint, surname
