= Quinn Sullivan =

Quinn Sullivan may refer to:

- Quinn Sullivan (musician), American singer, songwriter and guitarist
- Quinn Sullivan (soccer), American soccer player
