= Schneidereit =

Schneidereit is a German surname. Notable people with the surname include:

- Alfred Schneidereit (1919–1999), German SS officer
- Heinrich Schneidereit (1884–1915), German Olympic weightlifter

== Fictional characters ==
- Hanne Schneidereit, humorous figure portrayed by Marion Lindt
