= Lind =

Family name

Lind is a surname of both Swedish and Estonian origin. In Swedish, it is the word for the linden tree. In Estonian, it is the word for bird.

== Geographical distribution ==
As of 2014, 36.1% of all known bearers of the surname Lind were residents of the United States (frequency 1:17,107), 26.2% of Sweden (1:644), 8.0% of Germany (1:17,143), 7.7% of Denmark (1:1,255), 3.9% of Norway (1:2,278), 3.1% of Finland (1:3,054), 2.3% of Canada (1:27,037), 2.0% of Australia (1:20,530), 1.5% of Estonia (1:1,539) and 1.4% of Austria (1:10,630).

As of 1 January 2021, 369 men and 407 women have the surname Lind in Estonia. Lind is 112th most common surname for men in Estonia, and the 112th most common surname for women. The surname Lind is most commonly found in Hiiu County, where there 17.86 per 10,000 inhabitants of the county bear the surname.

In Sweden, the frequency of the surname was higher than national average (1:644) in the following regions:

1. Gävleborg County (1:368)
2. Dalarna County (1:421)
3. Uppsala County (1:451)
4. Norrbotten County (1:454)
5. Östergötland County (1:480)
6. Värmland County (1:505)
7. Västerbotten County (1:511)
8. Västernorrland County (1:519)
9. Kalmar County (1:542)
10. Södermanland County (1:597)
11. Jämtland County (1:602)
12. Västmanland County (1:627)
13. Jönköping County (1:642)

== Film, stage and television ==
- Arvi Lind (1940–2026), Finnish television news presenter
- Dagny Lind (1902–1992), Swedish film actress
- Della Lind (1906–1999), Austrian/American actress and operatic soprano
- Emily Alyn Lind (born 2002), American actress
- John Lind (female impersonator) (1877–1940), Swedish female impersonator, singer and dancer
- Letty Lind (1861–1923), English actress, dancer and acrobat
- Sarah Lind (born 1982), Canadian actress
- Traci Lind (born 1968), American film actress

== Music ==
- Bob Lind (born 1942), American folk music singer/songwriter
- Espen Lind (born 1971), Norwegian musician
- Eva Lind (born 1966), Austrian operatic soprano
- Jenny Lind (1820–1887), Swedish opera singer
- Jon Lind (fl. 1970–2000s), American songwriter and performer
- Mark Lind (fl. 2000s), American singer/songwriter
- Olle Lind (fl. 1970–1980s), Swedish musician
- Zach Lind (fl. 1990–2000s), American musician
- Sebastian Lind (born 1988), Danish musician

== Politics ==
- Albert Lind (1878–1964), Australian politician, Country Party member of the Victorian Legislative Assembly
- Amanda Lind (born 1980), Swedish politician
- Greg Lind (born 1957), American politician, Democratic Party member of the Montana Senate
- Ivar Lykke Falch Lind (1870–?), Norwegian jurist and politician for the Conservative Party
- James F. Lind (1900–1975), Democratic member of the U.S. House of Representatives
- Jim Lind (politician) (1913–1980), Liberal party member of the Canadian House of Commons
- John Lind (politician) (1854–1930), American politician
- Nathalie Lind (1918–1999), Danish politician
- Per Lind (1916–2012), Swedish diplomat
- Rikke Lind (born 1968), Norwegian politician for the Labour Party

== Science, medicine and technology ==
- Artur Lind (1927–1989), Estonian molecular biologist
- David A. Lind (1918–2015), American physicist and mountain climber
- Don L. Lind (1930–2022), American astronaut
- James Lind (1716–1794), Scottish pioneer of naval hygiene
- James Lind (1736-1812), Scottish physician and natural philosopher
- Jens Lind (1874–1939), Danish apothecary and botanist
- Karin Lind, Swedish astronomer
- Samuel C. Lind (1879–1965), American radiation chemist

== Sport ==
- Adam Lind (born 1983), American baseball player
- Andreas Lind (1922–1982), Danish sprint canoer
- Angelita Lind (born 1959), Puerto Rican track and field athlete
- Björn Lind (born 1978), Swedish cross country skier
- Carl Johan Lind (1883–1965), Swedish athlete in 1912 Summer Olympics
- Carl Lind (baseball) (1903–2001), American baseball player
- Caroline Lind (born 1982), American rower
- Dennis Lind (born 1993), Danish racing driver
- Dustin Lind, American baseball coach
- Folke Lind (1913–?), Swedish football player
- Haakon Lind (1906–1955), Norwegian boxer who competed in the 1928 Summer Olympics
- Harry Lind (1906–1986), Scottish international rugby union player
- Hasse Pavia Lind (born 1979), Danish athlete
- Jack Lind (born 1946), American Major League Baseball player
- Jim Lind (born 1947), American football player and coach
- Joan Lind (1952–2015), American rower
- Johan Lind (born 1942), Norwegian speed skater
- José Lind (born 1964), former Major League Baseball player
- Juha Lind (born 1974), Finnish ice hockey forward
- Kole Lind (born 1998), Canadian ice hockey player
- Heino Lind (1931–2008), Estonian sport sailor
- Mak Lind (born 1988), Swedish–Lebanese football manager and former player
- Lasse Lind (born 1981), Finnish football player
- Mads Lind (born 1980), Danish handball player
- Mikael Lind (born 1972), Swedish professional ice hockey player
- Pasi Lind (born 1961), Finnish judo athlete
- Raimo Lind, Finnish curler
- Sofia Lind (born 1975), Swedish cross-country skier
- Victoria Lind (born 1985), New Zealand cricketer

== Writing ==
- Angus Lind (born 1944), American columnist for the New Orleans Times-Picayune
- Idar Lind (born 1954), Norwegian author and playwright
- Jakov Lind (1927–2007), Austrian-British writer
- Melva Lind (1903–1997), American professor and author
- Michael Lind (born 1962), American political writer
- William S. Lind (born 1947), American expert on military affairs and pundit on cultural conservatism

== Other ==
- Baron von Lind (1937–2017), American artist, born Jerry Lind
- David Lind (1938–1995), American crime figure
- DeDe Lind (1947–2020), American glamour model
- Earl Lind (1874–?), American author and advocate for androgynes
- Edmund George Lind (1829–1909), English-born American architect
- Henry Curtis Lind (1921–2013), American lawyer
- James Lind (Royal Navy officer) (1765–1823), officer of the Royal Navy
- Johanna Lind (born 1971), Miss Sweden in 1993
- John Lind (barrister) (1737–1781), English barrister, political activist, and pamphleteer
- Lily Lind (1882–1916), New Zealand nurse who died in World War I
- Lizzy Lind af Hageby (1878–1963), Swedish countess, feminist, writer, and anti-vivisection activist
- Maj Lind (1876–1942), Finnish philanthropist
- Martin Lind (born 1944), Swedish Lutheran bishop
- Norman Lind (1920–1985), British/Norwegian military and government official
- Wallace L. Lind (1887–1940), officer in the United States Navy

== See also ==
- Linde (disambiguation)
- Lynd (disambiguation)
