= Lindt (disambiguation) =

Lindt is a Swiss chocolatier and confectionery company. It can also refer to:

== Places ==
- Groote Lindt, a village in Zwijndrecht, Netherlands
- Kleine-Lindt, a village in Zwijndrecht, Netherlands

== Surname ==
- August R. Lindt (1905–2000), Swiss lawyer and diplomat
- Franz Lindt (1844-1901), Swiss politician
- Hermann Lindt (1872–1937), Swiss politician
- John William Lindt, FRGS, (1845-1926) Australian landscape photographer and ethnographer
- Lieselotte Van Lindt (b. 1989), a Belgian field hockey player
- Marion Lindt (1908–1966), German actress from East Prussia
- Rodolphe Lindt (1855–1909), a Swiss chocolate manufacturer and inventor
- Rosemarie Lindt, a German ballet dancer
- Virna Lindt, a Swedish model and singer

== See also ==
- Lind (disambiguation)
- Lint (disambiguation)
