= Ditch Witch (food truck) =

Food truck on Ditch Plains Beach in the US

Coordinates: 41°02′24″N 71°54′51″W

The Ditch Witch Food Wagon is a food truck on Ditch Plains Beach in Montauk, Suffolk County, New York in the US. Since 1994, it has been a hub for surfers, tourists and local residents.

The truck offers a porch and seating on the beach. It serves high-end food wraps and coffee.

== History ==
The Ditch Witch was founded by Lili Adams in 1994. She leased utilities from her neighbor, The East Deck Motel. The parking lot place where it sits, is located in the ditch which floods when Lake Montauk overflows to the south. The Montauketts referred to it as "Choppaughshapaughhausuck," meaning "the spot where the stream flows out; the channel or opening of Great Pond towards the south." Great Pond, now known as Lake Montauk, was the body of water being referred to. No houses were constructed in that area.

In 2011, the East Hampton Town Board had a plan in place to grant an exclusive concession for the beach to a different vendor, who sold lobster rolls. Montaco, a taco truck, was also applying for a permit at the time for the Ditch Plains area. When the lobster roll vendor arrived, the permit for the Ditch Witch food vendor was revoked. During a town board meeting, the former town supervisor, Bill Wilkinson, raised concerns about the new vendor's limited menu and pricing. As a result, he made the decision to halt the implementation of the new ordinance, evicting the 'wagon' two weeks before Memorial Day, which allowed the Ditch Witch to continue operating.

In 2013, the nearby East Deck hotel (1954-2016) was sold for $15 million. The new owner, led by J. Darius Bikoff, the founder of Vitamin Water, had plans to convert the area into a members-only beach club. The parking lot, in the flood plain, was targeted. The plan failed upon encountering public opposition.

In 2013, the owner's son Grant Monahan who studied anthropology/humanities at Charleston College, held a one-man photo exhibition titled "A View from the Window." The photographs were taken from inside The Ditch Witch, as locals, surfers, and celebrities ordered food from the truck.

In 2015, another food truck arrived: Montauk Boardriders, selling coconut water and pre-packaged snacks.

In 2016, the East Deck was demolished, and the land underwent rezoning, leading to the inception of Montauk Colony. Also in 2016, Then Lieutenant Governor Kathy Hochul visited Ditch Plains to promote new energy efficient power converters for food trucks, which the Ditch Witch adopted.

== See also ==
- Food trucks
- Sandpiper Hill House Windmill
- East Deck Motel Family Resort
