= Lintner =

Lintner may refer to:

- John Lintner, economist and professor
- Joseph Albert Lintner, American entomologist
- Richard Lintner, Slovak ice hockey player
- °Lintner or Degrees Lintner, unit of measure

== See also ==
- Lindner (disambiguation)
