= Quinn Sullivan (musician) =

American musician (born 1999)

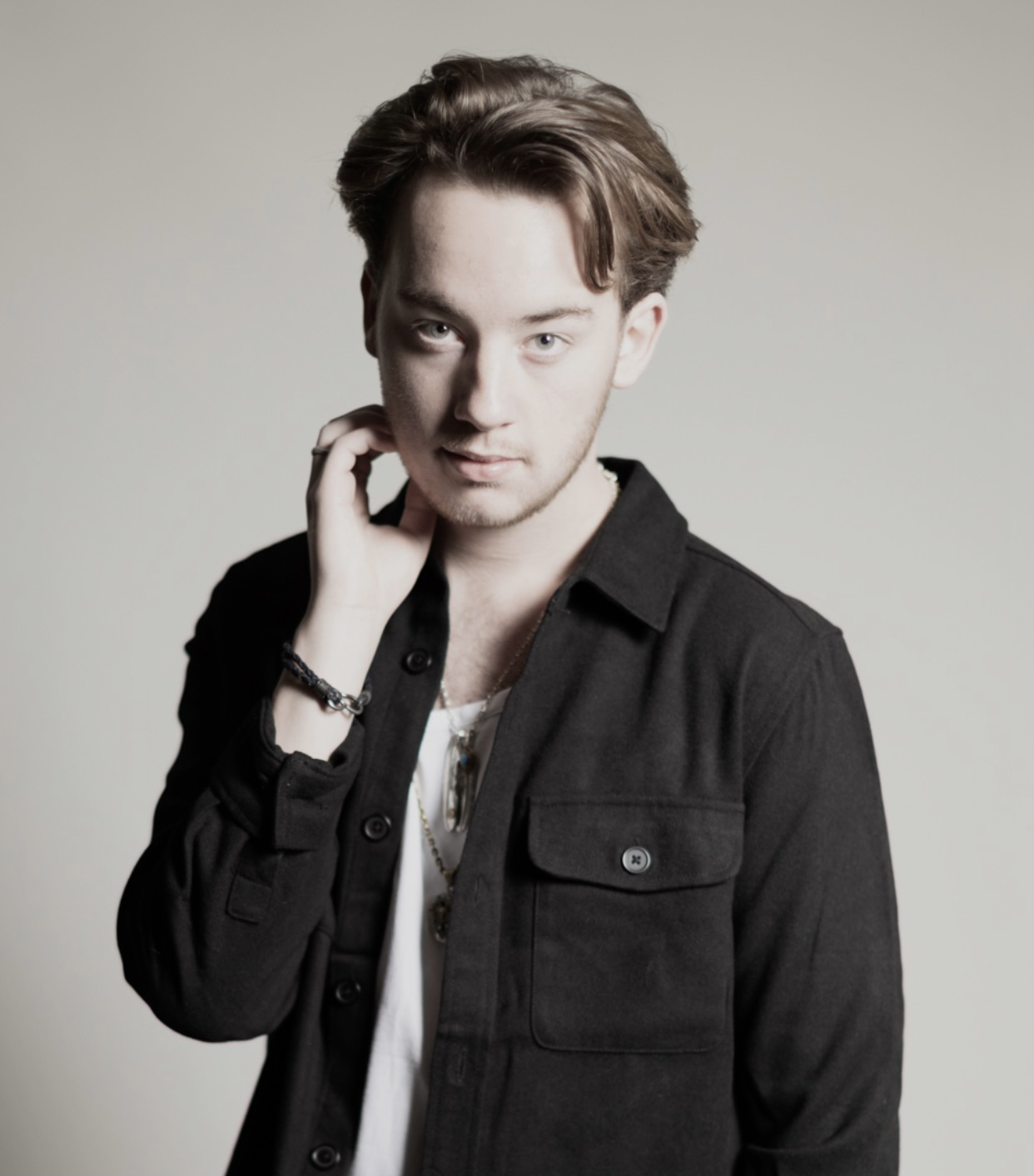
- Sullivan in 2020

Background information
- Born: March 26, 1999 (age 27)
- Origin: New Bedford, Massachusetts, United States
- Genres: Blues rock, pop rock
- Occupations: Musician and songwriter
- Instruments: Guitar, vocals
- Years active: 2006–present
- Labels: GBG Records/Oarfin, Superstar Records, Mascot Label Group/Provogue
- Website: www.quinnsullivanmusic.com

Quinn Sullivan (born March 26, 1999) is an American singer, songwriter and guitarist from New Bedford, Massachusetts, United States.

He is known for his accomplishments at an early age, marked by appearances on media such as The Ellen DeGeneres Show from the age of six, performing with artists Buddy Guy and B.B. King, and the release of his first album at the age of twelve.

== Career ==
Quinn Sullivan was born on March 26, 1999. According to Mascot Label Group, "he grew up in a musical family... his father [Terry Sullivan] was a drummer for a Grateful Dead cover band." Quinn began taking guitar lessons at age three. He has studied with Brian Cass of The Overclock Orchestra and the Toe Jam Puppet Band as well as Stan Belmarce. The first original song he wrote with Chris Waters was titled "Sing, Dance, Clap Your Hands". Sullivan first gained national media attention at age six when he appeared on The Ellen DeGeneres Show. He garnered more attention when Buddy Guy asked him to come on stage and play during a performance at the Zeiterion Theater in New Bedford, Massachusetts in 2007.

Sullivan has since performed on stage with Guy as well as with B.B. King and has played in venues such as the Beacon Theatre in New York City, the Orpheum Theatre in Boston, and Buddy Guy's Legends in Chicago. In 2008, Sullivan appeared on The Oprah Winfrey Show and was featured on NBC's The Today Show in July 2009. In 2009, Sullivan opened for Buddy Guy on his East Coast tour during the summer, played his own set at the summer music festival Lollapalooza, as well as the Austin City Limits Festival in October. In 2011, he appeared on the Jimmy Kimmel Live! show.

Sullivan made a guest appearance on Buddy Guy's Grammy-nominated album Skin Deep, released in 2008. His solo can be heard on the track "Who's Gonna Fill Those Shoes." His single, "Summer of Love," was released in 2009. Quinn released his debut album, Cyclone, in February 2011. He went on tour in the summer of 2011 with Buddy Guy to promote his album. In the fall of 2011, Quinn played such venues as Austin City Limits Music Festival and BB King's Blues Club in New York City.

In April 2013, Quinn Sullivan played at Madison Square Garden with his mentor Buddy Guy during the first night of the 2013 Crossroads Guitar Festival. That same year, he sat in with The Roots on Late Night with Jimmy Fallon, and was the musical guest on The Tonight Show with Jay Leno.

On January 16, 2014, Sullivan returned to The Ellen DeGeneres Show to perform "She Gets Me" from his album Getting There. He was given the first 60th Anniversary Stratocaster, signed by DeGeneres.

In 2015, Sullivan traveled to India to perform with Buddy Guy at The Mahindra Blues Festival, Mumbai. In 2017, he again performed at the festival as one of the headliners.

Midnight Highway, Sullivan's 2017 release, peaked at number 3 on the Billboard Top Blues Albums Chart.

On June 4, 2021, Sullivan released his fourth studio album, Wide Awake, preceded by the singles "All Around The World", "How Many Tears", and "In A World Without You".

On June 7, 2024, Sullivan released his 5th album “Salvation”, his most personal album, partly influenced by lost loves and the tragic death of his mother at aged 57 from a sudden illness.

On February 27, 2026, Sullivan released the single “Dust To Dust” on digital outlets.

== Discography ==
=== Albums ===
- 2011: Cyclone
- 2013: Getting There
- 2017: Midnight Highway
- 2021: Wide Awake
- 2024: Salvation
