= Theodoor Wilkens =

18th-century painter and draughtsman from the Dutch Republic

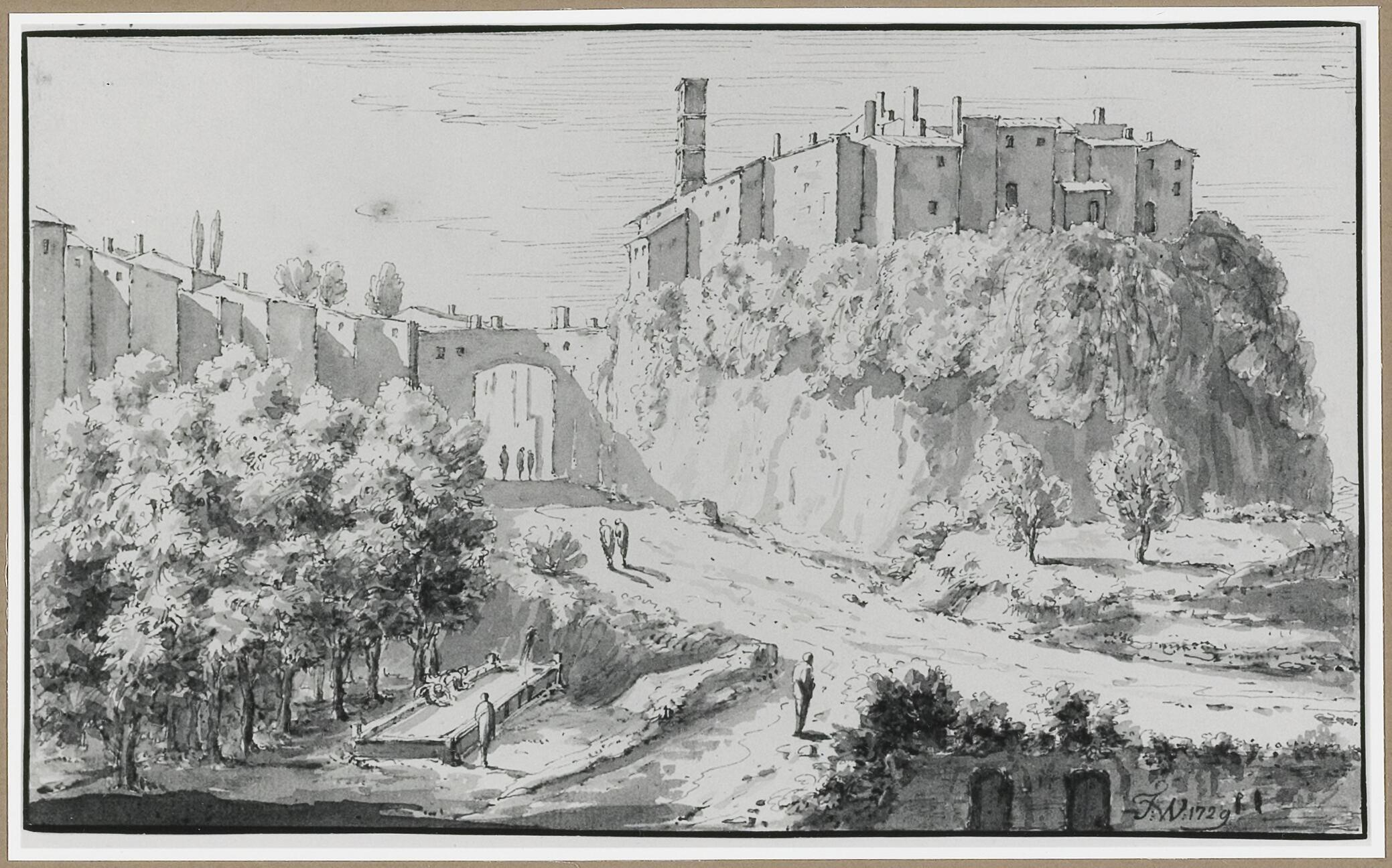
Washing place outside Italian town, 1729

Theodoor Wilkens or Theodorus Wilkens (alias Goedewil) (1690, Amsterdam – 1748, Amsterdam), was an 18th-century painter and draughtsman from the Dutch Republic who specialised in landscapes.

== Biography ==
Nothing is known about his apprenticeship. He travelled to Rome in 1710 or 1711. According to the early biographer Arnold Houbraken he travelled to Italy and joined the Bentvueghels, an association of mainly Dutch and Flemish artists active in Rome, and adopted the nickname Goedewil (good intention). Houbraken tells an anecdote about Wilkens' trip to Italy which he made together with the painter Hendrik Frans van Lint from Antwerp. The pair had set up their parasols and had started drawing in their portfolios to sketch the ruins of the old town of Ronciglione near Rome. A crowd then formed on the ramparts and watched them. The crowd's movement on the edge of the old medieval part of the town perched on a cliff caused a building to collapse. The crowd then concluded that they were practising witchcraft and they came storming out of the city. The artists were saved by a constable who brought them before the city governor who let them go after they had explained matters.

Back in Amsterdam Wilkens used his Italian sketches to make new drawings. His Italian landscapes date from the period of 1715 to 1744.

His death date is uncertain, but his painting collection was auctioned in Amsterdam on 17 June 1748.

== Works ==
He specialised in depictions of landscapes and architecture. No paintings by his hand have been preserved so that his work is known only through his drawings. He worked in an Italianate style that seems influenced by the Dutch landscape painters Albert Meijeringh and Johannes Glauber who both worked in Italy. The drawings of Wilkens also resemble some works of Caspar van Wittel. Both artists were at the same time in Rome. The stylistic similarities between their work makes it likely that the two artists knew each other in Rome.
