= Toe jam =

Toe jam may refer to:

== Places ==
- Toe Jam Hill on Bainbridge Island, Washington, United States

== Arts, entertainment, and media ==
=== Music ===
- "Toe Jam" (song), a 2008 song by The Brighton Port Authority
- “Toe Jam”, a 1969 song by Canadian band Edward Bear
- “Toe Jam”, a 1969 song by American rock band Mount Rushmore
- “Toe Jam”, a track on the 1977 album Riding High by Faze-O
- “Toe Jam”, a song on the 1988 album Pound for Pound by Canadian band Anvil
- “Toe Jam”, a song on the 2001 album Bedrock 3 by American jazz musician Uri Caine
- "Toe Jam", a track by Quincy Jones and Bill Cosby on the 2004 album The Original Jam Sessions 1969
- “Toe Jam”, an original song in the 2004 video game Dance Dance Revolution Ultramix 2
- Toe Jam, a 2012 EP by Australian musician Joe Robinson
- “The Toe Jam”, a track on the 1983 EP Buzz or Howl Under the Influence of Heat by American band Minutemen
- Toe Jam Band, the musical group accompanying guitarist Tony Meléndez

=== Other uses in arts, entertainment, and media ===
- Toe Jam Puppet Band, an American children's entertainment group
- ToeJam, a fictional character from the videogame ToeJam & Earl
  - ToeJam & Earl, 1991 videogame
  - ToeJam & Earl in Panic on Funkotron, 1993 videogame
  - ToeJam & Earl III: Mission to Earth, 2002 videogame
  - ToeJam & Earl: Back in the Groove, 2019 videogame
