= Lents (disambiguation) =

Lents is a neighborhood in the Southeast section of Portland, Oregon.

Lents may also refer to:

- Lents (crater)
- Lents Town Center/Southeast Foster Road
- Lent Bumps or Lents, a set of rowing races held annually Cambridge

== People with the surname ==
- Lisa Lents (b. 1986), Danish TV personality

== See also ==
- Lent (disambiguation)
