= 2003–04 Elitserien season =

- League: Elitserien
- Sport: Ice hockey
- Duration: 24 September 2003 – 26 February 2004

Regular season
- League champion: HV 71
- Season MVP: Johan Davidsson (HV71)
- Top scorer: Magnus Kahnberg (Västra Frölunda HC)

Playoffs

Finals
- Champions: HV71
- Runners-up: Färjestad BK

SHL seasons
- 2002–03 2004–05

The 2003–04 Elitserien season was the 29th season of Elitserien. It started in September 2003, with the regular season ending February 2004. The Jönköping-based ice hockey club HV71 won the championship for their second title.

== Regular season ==
=== Final standings ===
2003–04 Elitserien season	GP	W	L	OTW/SOW	OTL/SOL	GF	GA	Pts
y - HV 71	50	27	15	6	2	162	116	95
x - Färjestads BK	50	24	14	6	6	161	129	90
x - Västra Frölunda HC	50	24	16	7	3	160	116	89
x - Linköpings HC	50	25	17	3	5	141	105	86
x - Djurgårdens IF	50	23	16	6	5	145	125	86
x - Timrå IK	50	21	20	2	7	117	124	74
x - Luleå HF	50	19	23	5	3	119	132	70
x - Modo Hockey	50	16	21	7	6	113	141	68
e - Södertälje SK	50	18	24	2	6	132	161	64
e - Brynäs IF	50	18	27	2	3	121	151	61
r - Malmö Redhawks	50	16	27	6	1	112	151	61
r - Leksands IF	50	11	22	6	11	129	161	56

=== Scoring leaders ===
	Player	Team	Sp	G	A	P
1.	Magnus Kahnberg	Västra Frölunda HC	50	33	16	49
2.	Pelle Prestberg	Färjestads BK	50	22	23	45
3.	Joakim Eriksson	Södertälje SK	50	15	29	44
4.	Mikko Peltola	Linköpings HC	47	14	29	43
5.	Mikael Lind	Brynäs IF	45	14	28	42
	Kalle Sahlstedt	HV 71	50	20	22	42
7.	Tomi Kallio	Västra Frölunda HC	50	24	17	41
8.	Andreas Salomonsson	MODO Hockey	47	13	26	39
9.	Johan Davidsson	HV 71	49	14	24	38
10.	Jörgen Jönsson	Färjestads BK	49	16	21	37

== Playoffs ==
After the regular season, the standard of 8 teams qualified for the playoffs.

=== Playoff bracket ===
In the first round, the highest remaining seed chose which of the four lowest remaining seeds to be matched against. In each round the higher-seeded team was awarded home ice advantage. Each best-of-seven series followed a 1–1–1–2–1–1 format: the higher-seeded team played at home for games 2 and 4 (plus 5 and 7 if necessary), and the lower-seeded team was at home for game 1, 3 and 6 (if necessary).

Quarterfinals
1	HV71	4
8	Modo Hockey	2
4	Linköpings HC	1
6	Timrå IK	4
(Pairings are reseeded after the first round)
3	Västra Frölunda HC	4
5	Djurgårdens IF	0
2	Färjestads BK	4
7	Luleå HF	1

Semifinals
1	HV71	4
3	Västra Frölunda HC	2
2	Färjestads BK	4
6	Timrå IK	1

Finals
1	HV71	4
2	Färjestads BK	3

== Elitserien awards ==
Le Mat Trophy: HV71
Guldpucken: Johan Davidsson, HV71
Guldhjälmen: Magnus Kahnberg, Västra Frölunda HC
Honken Trophy: Henrik Lundqvist, Västra Frölunda HC
Håkan Loob Trophy: Magnus Kahnberg, Västra Frölunda HC
Rookie of the Year: Loui Eriksson, Västra Frölunda HC
Guldpipan: Thomas Andersson, Gävle

== See also ==
- 2003 in sports
- 2004 in sports
