= Jakov Lind =

Austrian-British writer (1927–2007)

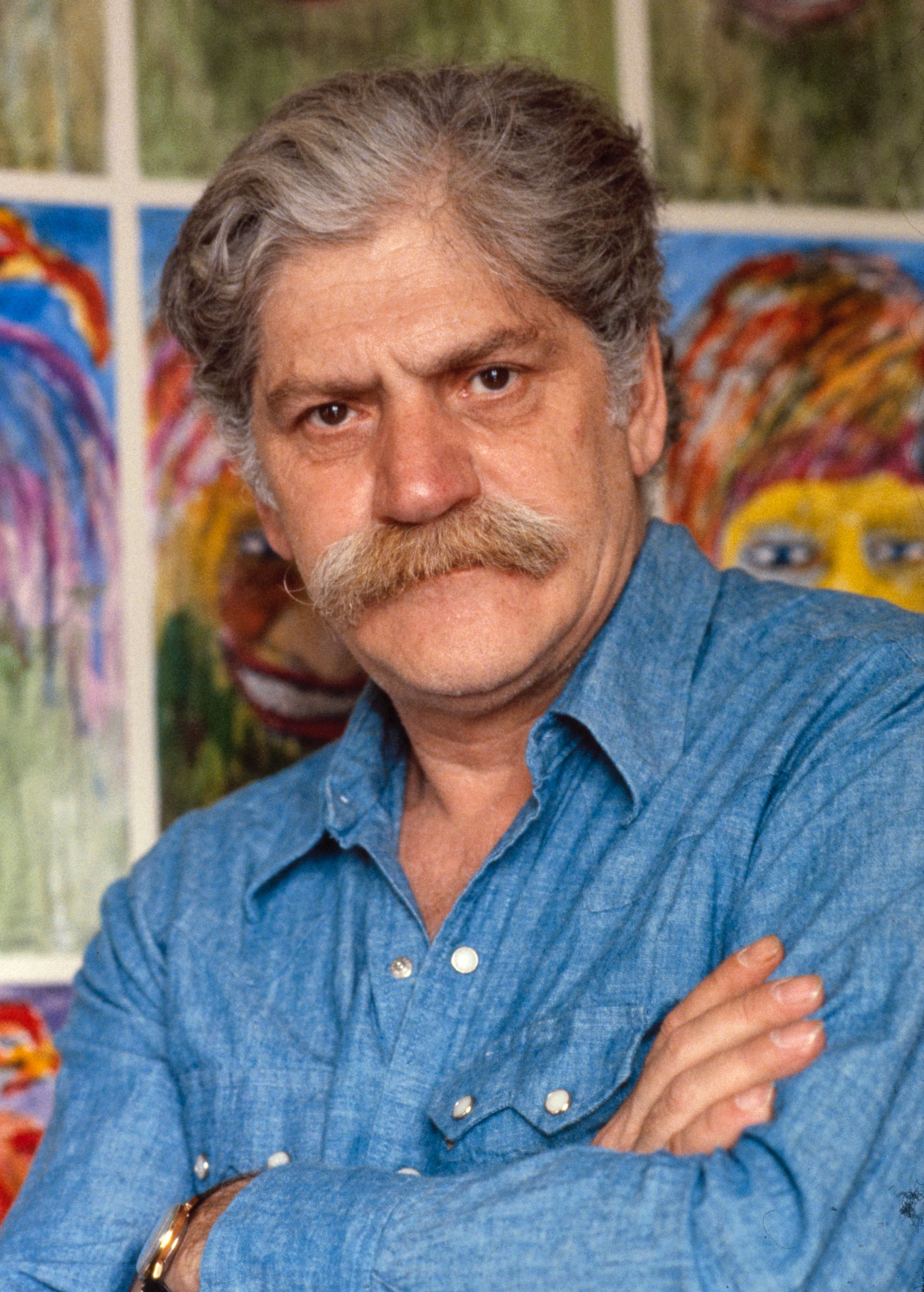
Lind in 1983

Jakov Lind (born Heinz Jakov Landwirth, 10 February 1927 in Vienna – 16 February 2007 in London) was an Austrian-British writer of short stories and novels.

== Early life ==
After the annexation of Austria by Germany in 1938, Jews were immediately targeted by the new Nazi regime with anti-Semitic decrees designed to make their lives untenable and force them to leave Austria. The decrees included prohibition of using public transportation, of being employed, and of operating businesses. Jews were expelled from schools and universities, had their businesses "Aryanized", a euphemism for their theft and confiscation by the Nazi regime, and were harassed with washing street signs of the previous regime in front of cheering and violent mobs. Eventually they were forced out of their apartments and prevented from leaving the country by themselves.

While sitting in a cafe, Lind's father was picked up and arrested by the Gestapo, and shortly afterwards the family was ordered to evacuate their apartment within 24 hours. On the run, his mother managed to find a place for Lind and two sisters on a "Kindertransport" bound to the Netherlands. After Lind's father was somehow released, his parents struggled to leave Austria on a Danube barge bound for the Black Sea. There they boarded the ship Patria which was sunk with great loss of lives at Haifa Port in November 1940 by the Haganah in an effort to prevent the British from turning it back to Europe.

As a child of 11 years in the Netherlands, Lind stayed initially in a children home in The Hague with his two sisters, but after a few months the siblings were separated and Lind moved in with a foster family who was paid by a Jewish organization towards his upkeep. After the German invasion of the Netherlands on 10 May 1940, the situation became difficult for the family, and Lind had to leave. He spent various time periods with different families as well as in a youth center in Gouda. Lind moved to Amsterdam and stayed with the family Granaat, first in their home in Amsterdam South, then joining them when they were forced to evacuate their apartment and move into the Jewish Ghetto.

During a roundup and deportation of Jews from the Ghetto in 1943, the family obeyed orders to leave the apartment and board lorries bound to Westerbork, while Lind stayed behind in hiding. On the run, Lind was able to obtain a false identity card bearing the name of Jan Gerrit Overbeek. Assuming this identity, Lind worked in different jobs in the Netherlands, and then decided to take a job on a German barge carrying coal into Germany. Lind succeeded in surviving inside Nazi Germany. Of this period, Lind later wrote, "As Jan Gerrit Overbeek, I felt safe for the first time. It is crazy, walking around freely when one really should be sitting in a concentration camp. Crazy, perhaps, but a craziness that made me content, and happy."

== Writing career ==
In 1945, Heinz Jakov Landvirt became Jakov Lind, and he made his way to Haifa. After a literary apprenticeship, a marriage, and the birth of a son, he moved to Vienna for three years. Finally, in 1954, he settled in London, where he wrote, in German, the short stories and novels on which his stature as a major European writer is based: Soul of Wood, Landscape in Concrete, and Ergo. Lind began writing in English, and the autobiography Counting My Steps was the first book written in his new language. On switching to English, Lind wrote that he was "Madder than anything...to think I could ever unlearn sounds I knew by heart and kidneys and replace them with other and better sounds." His stories have been translated into English, German, Danish, Swedish, Dutch, French, Italian, Norwegian, Finnish, Spanish, Hungarian, and Czech. His work has been adapted into plays, operas, and films. A collection of essays about his life and writings has also been published, Writing After Hitler: the Work of Jakov Lind (2001).

== Books ==
- Soul of Wood (1964, first in German 1962 Eine Seele aus Holz)
- Landscape in Concrete (1966, first in German 1963 Landschaft in Beton)
- Ergo: A Comedy (1967, first in German as the novel Eine bessere Welt. In fünfzehn Kapiteln)
- Counting My Steps (1969)
- Numbers: A Further Autobiography (1972)
- The Trip to Jerusalem (1973)
- The Silver Foxes Are Dead and Other Plays (1968)
- Travels to the Enu: The Story of a Shipwreck (1982)
- The Stove (1983)
- The Inventor (1987)
- Crossing: the Discovery of Two Islands (1991)

== See also ==
- Lind
