= Lind (disambiguation) =

Lind is a surname.

It may also refer to:

== Places ==
- Lind, Herning, Herning, Denmark
- Lind, Ahrweiler, Germany
- Lind, Cologne, a city part of Porz, Cologne, Germany
- Lind, Mayen-Koblenz, Mayen-Koblenz, Germany
- Lind, Iran, a village in Mazandaran Province, Iran
- Lind, Washington, United States
- Lind, Wisconsin, United States, a town
  - Lind Center, Wisconsin, United States, an unincorporated community
- Lind, Burnett County, Wisconsin, an unincorporated community
- Lind Glacier, Antarctica
- Lind Ridge, Antarctica
- Lind National Park, Victoria, Australia

== Fiction ==
- Lind (Oh My Goddess!), a Valkyrie Goddess in the anime/manga series Oh My Goddess!
- Lind L. Tailor, a minor character in the anime/manga series Death Note

== See also ==
- Linde (disambiguation)
- Lindt (disambiguation)
- Lint (disambiguation)
