= Linter =

Linter may refer to:

== Places ==
- Linter, Belgium, a municipality located in the province of Flemish Brabant
- Linter, a neighborhood of Limburg an der Lahn, Germany

== Computing and technology ==
- Lint (software), a tool to analyze and find problems in source code, is sometimes called a “linter”.
- Linter SQL RDBMS, database system
- Linter Group, Australian textiles company
- Linter, a machine for removing the short fibers from cotton seeds after ginning.

== Surname ==
- Dmitri Linter (born 1973), Estonian political activist
- Juliana Emma Linter, British conchologist

== See also ==
- Lint (disambiguation)
