= Lent (disambiguation) =

Lent, in Western Christianity, is the period before the Christian holy day of Easter.

Lent may also refer to:

== Christian observances ==
- Great Lent, in Eastern Christianity, the period that corresponds to Western Lent
- Jack o' Lent, an event in medieval England involving the burning of an effigy of Judas Iscariot made of straw and rags
- Lent Event, community based Christian social justice movement
- Lent in Malta, numerous religious traditions, most of them inherited from one generation to the next, that are part of the Paschal celebrations in the Maltese Islands

== Places ==
- Lent, Ain, a commune in Ain, France
- Lent, Jura, a commune in Jura, France
- Lent, Netherlands, a village in the municipality of Nijmegen, Netherlands
- Lent Township, Chisago County, Minnesota, a township in the U.S.
- Lent Homestead and Cemetery, a historic cemetery in New York City
- Lent, Maribor, an old part of Maribor, Slovenia

== People with the surname ==
- Abraham Lent (1789–1873), Nova Scotia politician
- Abraham Lent (New York City) (1815–1882), New York politician
- Arie van Lent (b. 1970), Dutch-German footballer
- Berkeley Lent (1921–2007), American politician and jurist in the state of Oregon
- Blair Lent (1930–2009), American author and illustrator of mostly Chinese-themed books
- Gladys H. Lent-Barndollar (1872-1938), American businesswoman and clubwoman
- Helmut Lent (1918–1944), German night fighter ace in World War II
- James Lent (1782–1833), U.S. Representative from New York
- James Lent (Nova Scotia politician) (1753–1838)
- John Lent (b. 1948), Canadian poet and novelist
- Michael Lent (visual artist), co-creator and publisher of Toby Room magazine
- Norman F. Lent (1931–2012), Conservative Republican member of the United States House of Representatives from New York
- Willis Lent (1904–1959), rear admiral in the United States Navy

== Art, entertainment, and media ==
- Lent (album), an album by Dallas Crane
- Lent Festival, arts festival in Lent, Maribor, Slovenia
- Lent Talks, a series of talks, normally broadcast on BBC Radio in the United Kingdom, to mark the Christian season of Lent
- The Fight Between Carnival and Lent (1559), an oil-on-panel work painted by Pieter Bruegel the Elder
- Lent, a 2019 fantasy novel by Jo Walton

== Events ==
- "Buddhist Lent", a commonly used term for Vassa or Rains Retreat, a three-month annual retreat observed by Theravada practitioners in Burma, which takes place during the wet season
- Lent term, spring academic term at certain British universities

== Sports ==
- Lent Bumps or Lents, a set of rowing races held annually in Cambridge

== See also ==
- Lending
- Lentic ecosystem, a lake ecosystem
- Lenting, a municipality in the district of Eichstätt in Bavaria, Germany
- Lento (disambiguation)
- Lents (disambiguation)
- Lint (disambiguation)
