= Eugen Lindner =

German composer

Eugen Lindner (11 December 1858 in Leipzig – 12 November 1915 in Weimar) was a German composer, notably of opera. A friend of Richard Strauss and Gustav Mahler, he was an important figure in musical scene in Weimar before the First World War. Lindner's earlier career was spent in Leipzig, where his recently completed opera Ramiro was first staged in September 1886 at the Neues Stadttheater, with Mahler conducting in his own first season there.

== Biography ==
Lindner was a pupil of Edmund Abesser and Gustav Kogel for the piano; of Volck and Friedrich Stack in composition and of Franz Götze in singing and, at the age of twenty, became a chorus master in his home town. He quickly allied himself stylistically with Wagner and began to conduct Wagner's works. He was also in demand as a singer and as a singing teacher but began to turn his attention more and more to composition. Eventually he was nominated as a Court (Imperial) Professor of Music in Weimar.

Other works include the operas Der Meisterdieb (The Master Thief) (1889), to a libretto by Gustav Kastroff and the composer after Arthur Fitger's poem, and the unstaged opera Eldena. He produced many songs (over sixty, some with orchestral arrangements) for voice and piano in a romantic and dramatic, sometimes declamatory style, using post-Wagnerian harmony, mostly published by the Hermann Seemann Nachfolger Verlag to texts by such poets as Carl Busse, Ada Negri, Otto Roquette and Primnce Emil zu Schönaich-Carolath, whose almost exact contemporary he was.

Lindner was sometimes attracted to exotic or eastern subjects, typified by the short song cycle "Lieder des Saidjah".

== Sources ==
- "Eugen Lindner" in Riemann Musiklexikon Berlin, Max Hesse 1922

Songs of Eugen Lindner
