= Hendrik Frans van Lint =

Flemish landscape painter (1684–1763)

- Born: 26 January 1684; Antwerp, Holy Roman Empire
- Died: 24 September 1763 (aged 79); Rome, Papal States
- Other names: Studie (Dutch), Studio (Italian)
- Known for: Painting
- Relatives: Pieter van Lint, Giacomo van Lint

Hendrik Frans van Lint (26 January 1684; 24 September 1763) was a Flemish landscape and vedute painter who was part of the group of Flemish and Dutch painters active in Rome. He was one of the leading landscape painters in Rome in the first half of the 18th century and his patrons included Rome's old aristocratic families as well as European travellers on their Grand Tour.

== Life ==
Hendrik Frans van Lint was born in Antwerp, the son of the history painter Pieter van Lint and his second wife Anna Moeren (Moren or Morren). As his father died when he was only 6 years old van Lint became in 1696 an apprentice of Peeter van Bredael, a painter of Italianate landscapes. Van Lint did not stay to complete his apprenticeship but left for Rome somewhere between 1697 and 1700. Here he would stay for the remainder of his life except for a short visit to Antwerp in 1710 after the death of his mother.

In 1697, van Lint joined the Bentvueghels, an association of mainly Dutch and Flemish artists working in Rome. It was customary for the Bentvueghels to adopt an appealing nickname, the so-called 'bent name'. Van Lint's bent name was: studie (in Dutch) or lo studio (and even 'Monsú Studio') (in Italian). This nickname may have been given him because of his meticulous technique, which relied on extensive preparatory work and studies. He was in the habit of making detailed drawings in pencil, pen and wash, often in situ. He would frequently go on expeditions lasting up to a few weeks to the countryside around Rome. On these expeditions he was sometimes accompanied by the Dutch painter Theodoor Wilkens. Van Lint would use his preparatory studies to develop full-scale compositions on canvas and often added ruins and classical buildings to create his elaborate imaginary landscapes.

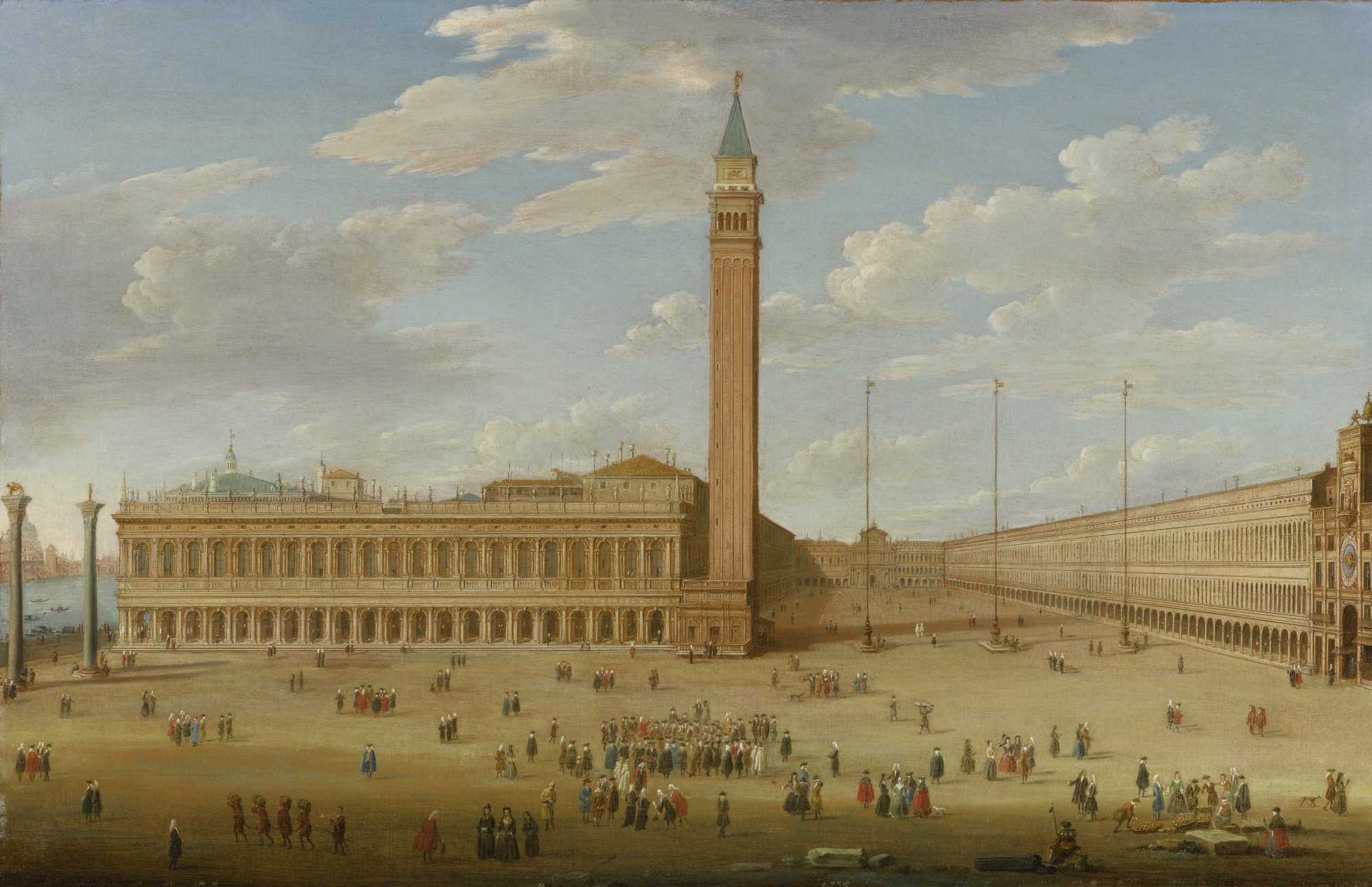
Venice, a view of the Piazza San Marco with the Piazzetta; 1734–63, oil on canvas, 47 × 73 cm, private collection.

Van Lint lived in the via del Babuino and married in 1719 Ludovica Margarete Tassel, daughter of an Italian tailor. The couple had 10 children, one of whom called Jacob or Giacomo van Lint (Rome, 1723 – 1790) also a became a vedute painter. Another son called Giovanni Rocco (1736–1781) became a silversmith.

Van Lint appears to have moved in the circle of the Dutch vedute painter Gaspar van Wittel, known in Rome as ‘il Vanvitelli’. Van Wittel had settled in Rome in 1675 where his topographical views had made him one of the most feted artists of his generation. Van Lint possibly worked in van Wittel's workshop to assist the aging artist in the completion of his many commissions.

Van Lint had a successful career and his patrons included eminent visitors to Rome and aristocrats on their Grand Tour, as well as some of the great patrician Roman families, including the Altoviti, Capponi, Pamphili, Sacchetti and Soderini. Don Lorenzo Colonna particularly liked his work and owned no less than 70 landscapes by the artist.

Van Lint's wife died in 1744. The same year he joined the Congregazione Artistica dei Virtuosi al Pantheon and was elected its Rector in 1755. The Congregazione was a corporation of artists who organised annual exhibitions of their own paintings on the metal railings in front of the Pantheon. Van Lint probably also worked as a picture restorer.

He died in his house on via del Babuino in Rome on 24 September 1763.

== Work ==
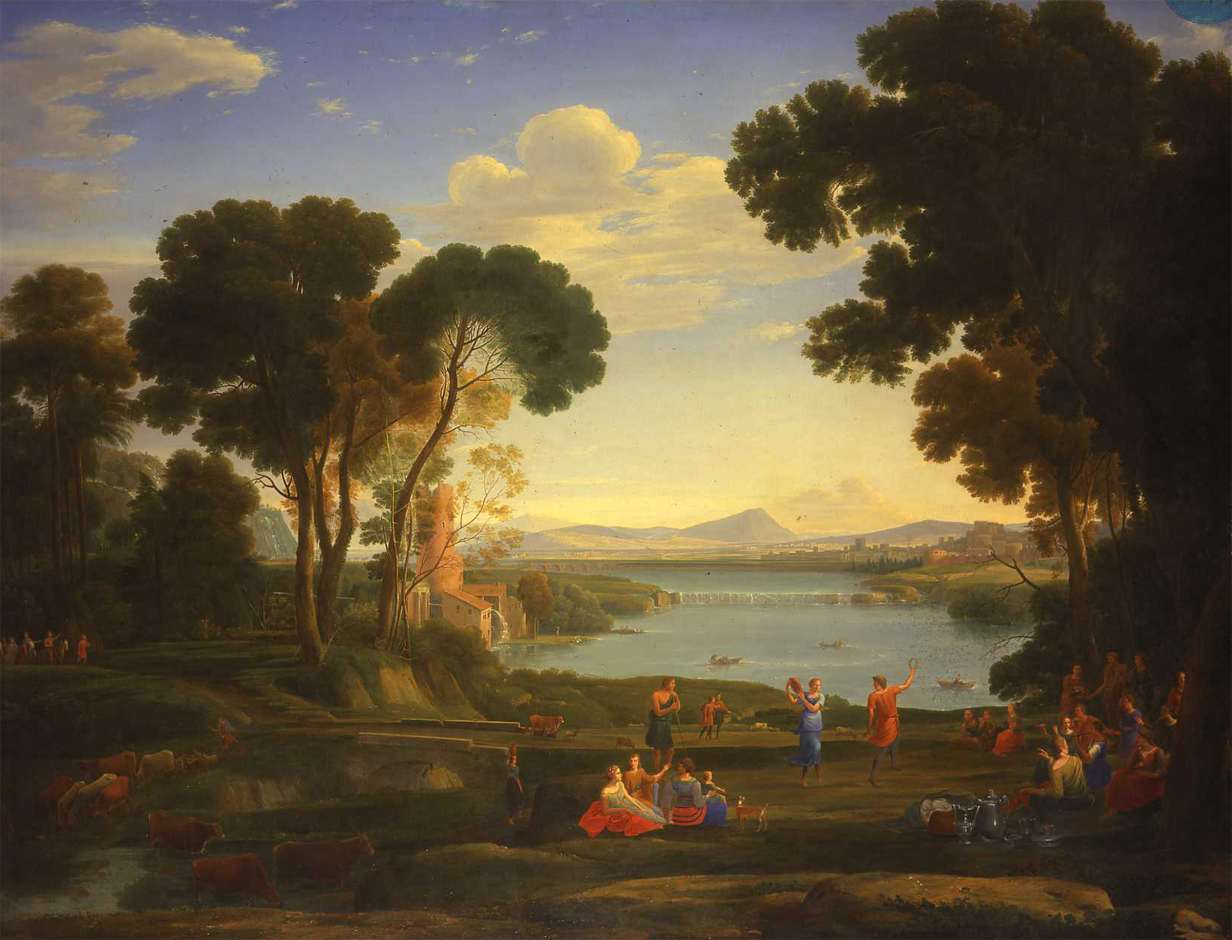
Landscape with a Watermill and Dancing Figures (The Wedding of Isaac and Rebecca); 1737, oil on canvas, 154 × 198 cm, private collection.

Van Lint was specialized in landscapes which fall globally in two categories: idealized landscapes of people in nature and "vedute", landscapes or town views that are mainly topographical in conception. Among his earliest dated works produced in Rome are paintings from 1711, including View of a monastery on the Aventine, now in the collection of the Galleria Doria Pamphili. It has been suggested that this was the year in which he left van Wittel's workshop to strike out on his own.

His idealized landscapes follow less the style of his contemporaries and compatriots Abraham Genoels and Jan Frans van Bloemen, who specialized in this subject matter. Van Lint went in a different direction under the influence of Claude Lorrain's Arcadian landscapes. Van Lint may have studied Lorrain's works in numerous Roman collections. It has been suggested that van Lint started out as a reluctant copyist of the work of Lorrain whose work was in strong demand but unavailable on the market. It was only later that he started to paint his own compositions inspired by and dotted with references to Lorrain as well as Nicolas Poussin.

A good example of the influence of Lorraine on his idealized landscapes are the pair of paintings entitled Landscape with a Watermill and Dancing Figures (The Wedding of Isaac and Rebecca) and Landscape with the Nurture of Jupiter (private collections). The two compositions are directly inspired by Lorrain's monumental pair of landscapes in the Galleria Doria Pamphilij, Rome. In particular the first work is directly based on Lorrain's Landscape with Dancing Figures (The Mill), while the second is only inspired in its overall design by Claude's original of the View of Delphi with a procession. Van Lint was no slavish follower of Lorrain but rather an inventor of his own as shown by the fact that he introduced a number of elements that are absent from Claude's work, such as the hound in the centre or the shepherd leading his flock over a bridge.

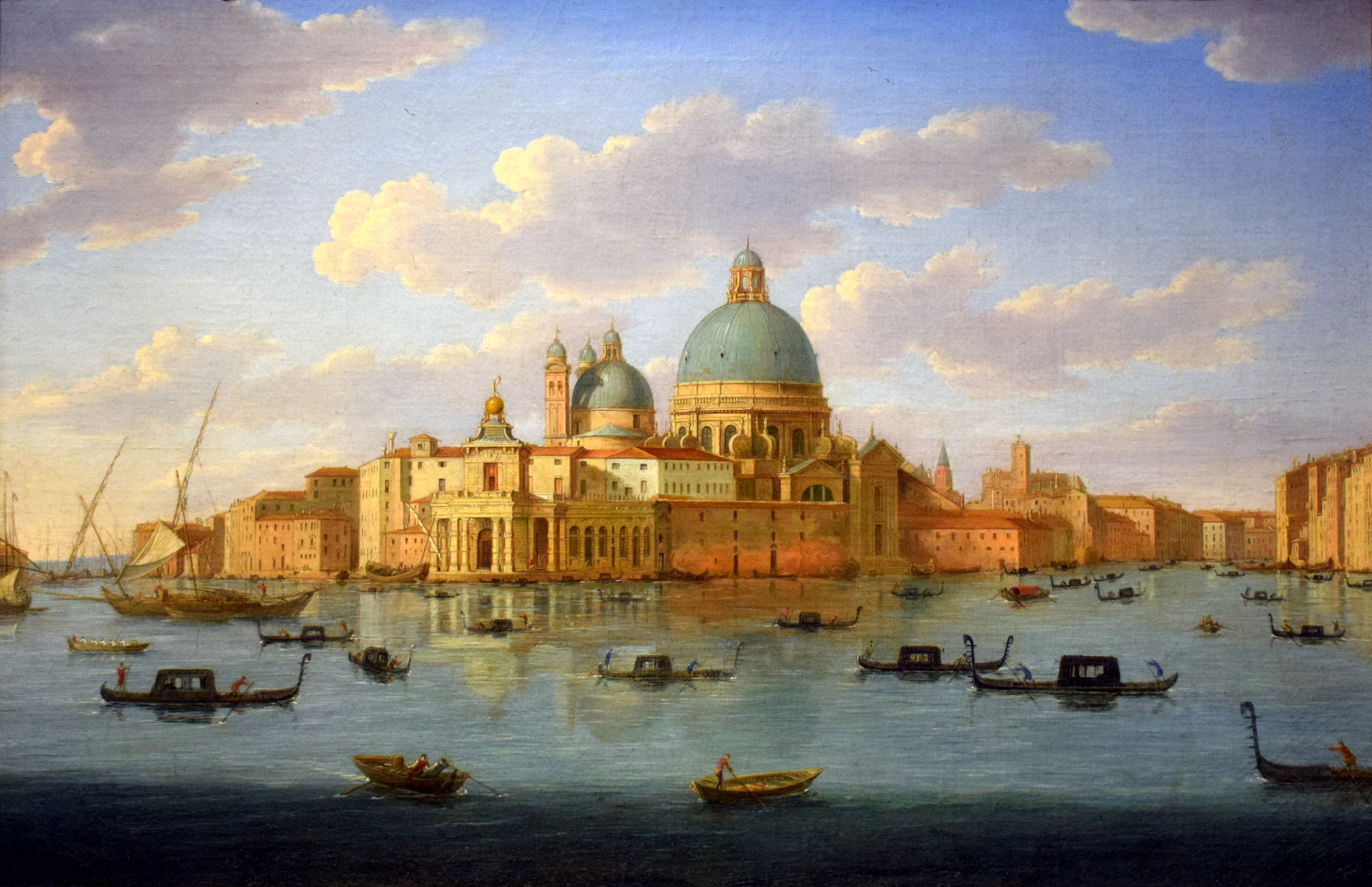
Veduta of La Salute with the Punta della Dogana; c. 1750, 47 × 72 cm, Palazzo Leoni Montanari, Vicenza.

Van Lint also shows that he is at heart a vedute painter who preferred realistic views by substituting for Claude's fantastical domed palace a representation of the Colosseum and a monument that he had depicted on numerous occasions in his Roman vedute and may be based on an existing feature in Rome. Like Lorrain, van Lint paid particular attention to the trees in his compositions. His wide open compositions are imbued with silence and invite contemplation. It has been argued that van Lint adapted Lorrain's style to 18th-century taste by using paler and clearer tones, prettier colours and sharper handling. In his topographical views van Lint was first directed by his experience working for van Wittel. His earliest topographical views (vedute dal vero) of Rome included sweeping panoramic views of the city from many different approaches and locations. Eventually he painted everything worth seeing in Rome which resulted in many views of similar subjects such as the Colosseum, the Arch of Constantine, the Pyramid of Cestius, and the Baths of Diocletian and Caracalla. Van Lint painted many views of Rome's bridges, which he rendered with a mixture of naturalism and poetry. His sharp powers of observation make him stand out as a vedute painter in the 18th century.

Van Lint painted also many views of the waterways, waterfalls and harbours around Rome and beyond. These include views of Naples and Venice, cities for which there is no documentary evidence that he actually traveled there. It is likely he developed these compositions on the basis of van Wittel's treatment of similar subjects.

While van Lint is known to have employed other artists such as Corrado Giaquinto, Adriaen Manglard, Anton Raphael Mengs, Pierre Subleyras, Sebastiano Conca, Giuseppe Chiari and Placido Costanzi to paint the staffage in his landscapes, he often painted the figures himself. The only artists whose figures have been identified in his work are Pompeo Batoni and Francesco Zuccarelli. The figures he painted in his compositions were often inspired by those of famous painters of the 17th century such as Guido Reni.

Henry Hoare's print collection at Stourhead is thought to have been hand-coloured in a collaborative effort by Hendrik van Lint and his son, Giacomo. In a manuscript catalogue the colouring of these prints is attributed to a 'Mr Studio'. The technique is consistent with Hendrik van Lint's paintings but evidence, including a recorded comment regarding the 'young Studio', suggests that the colouring may have been a family enterprise.

== Gallery ==
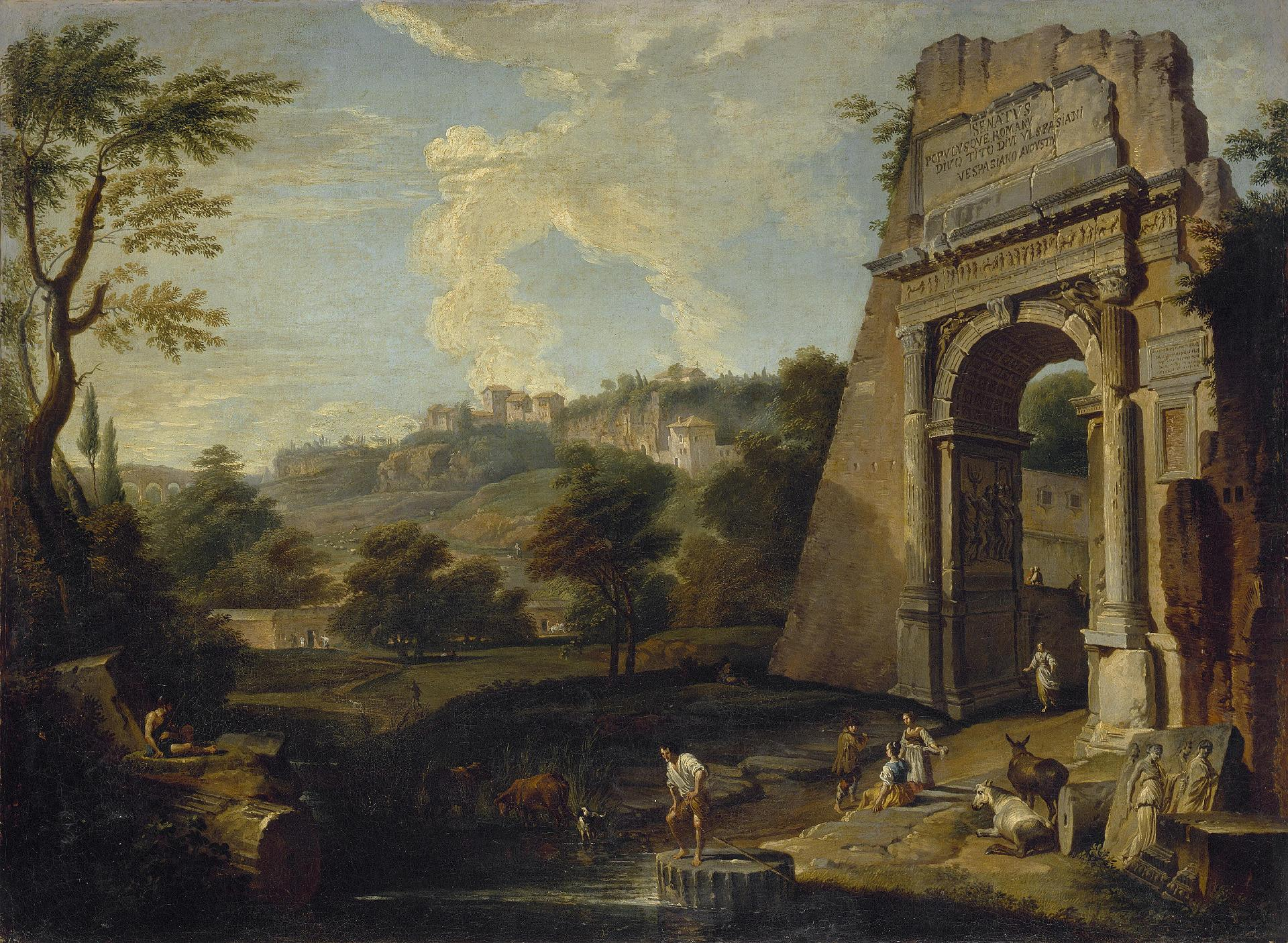
View of the Titus Arch and Palatine in Rome; 1710s, oil on canvas, 73 × 100 cm, Hermitage Museum.

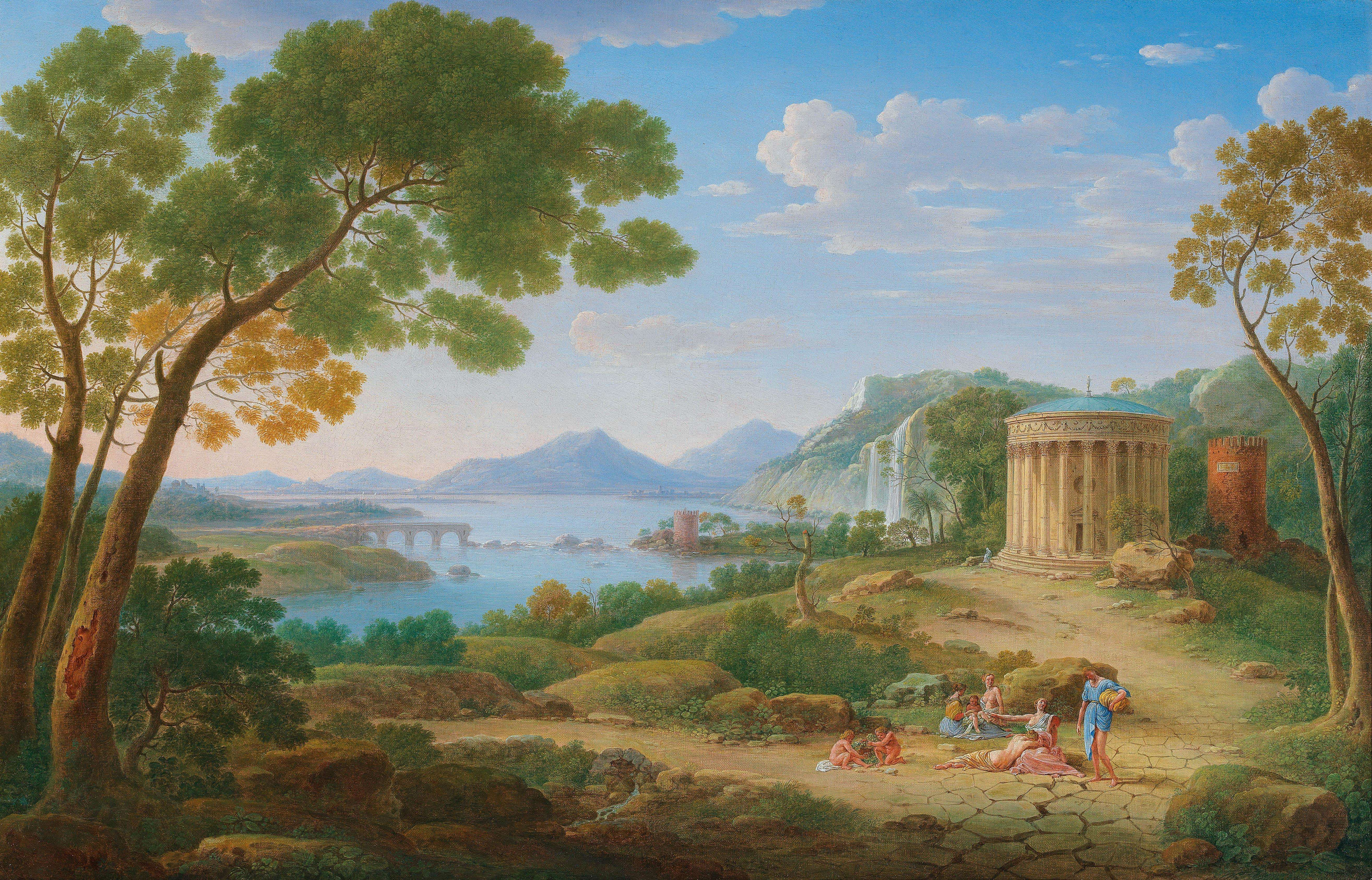
Classical Landscape with Figures Seated before a Tempietto; 1748, oil on canvas, 48 × 72 cm, private collection.

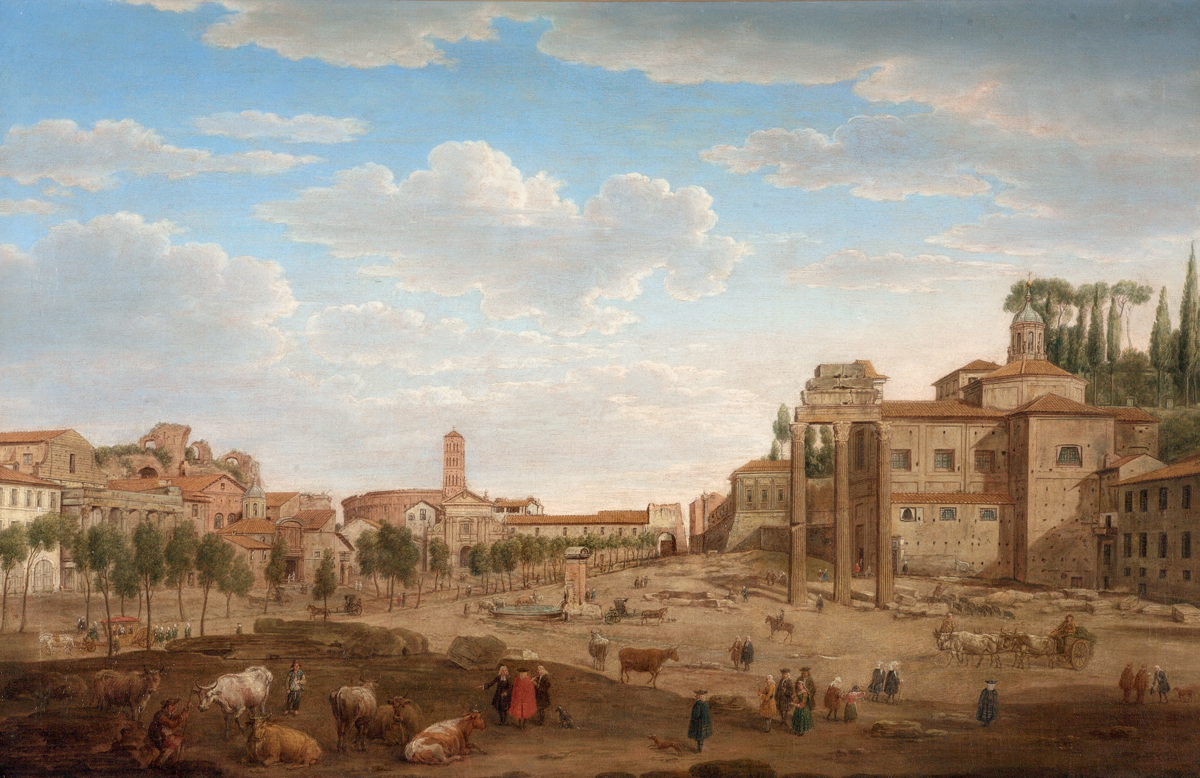
Campo Vaccino, Rome; 1697–1763, oil on canvas, 44 × 69 cm, Victoria Art Gallery.

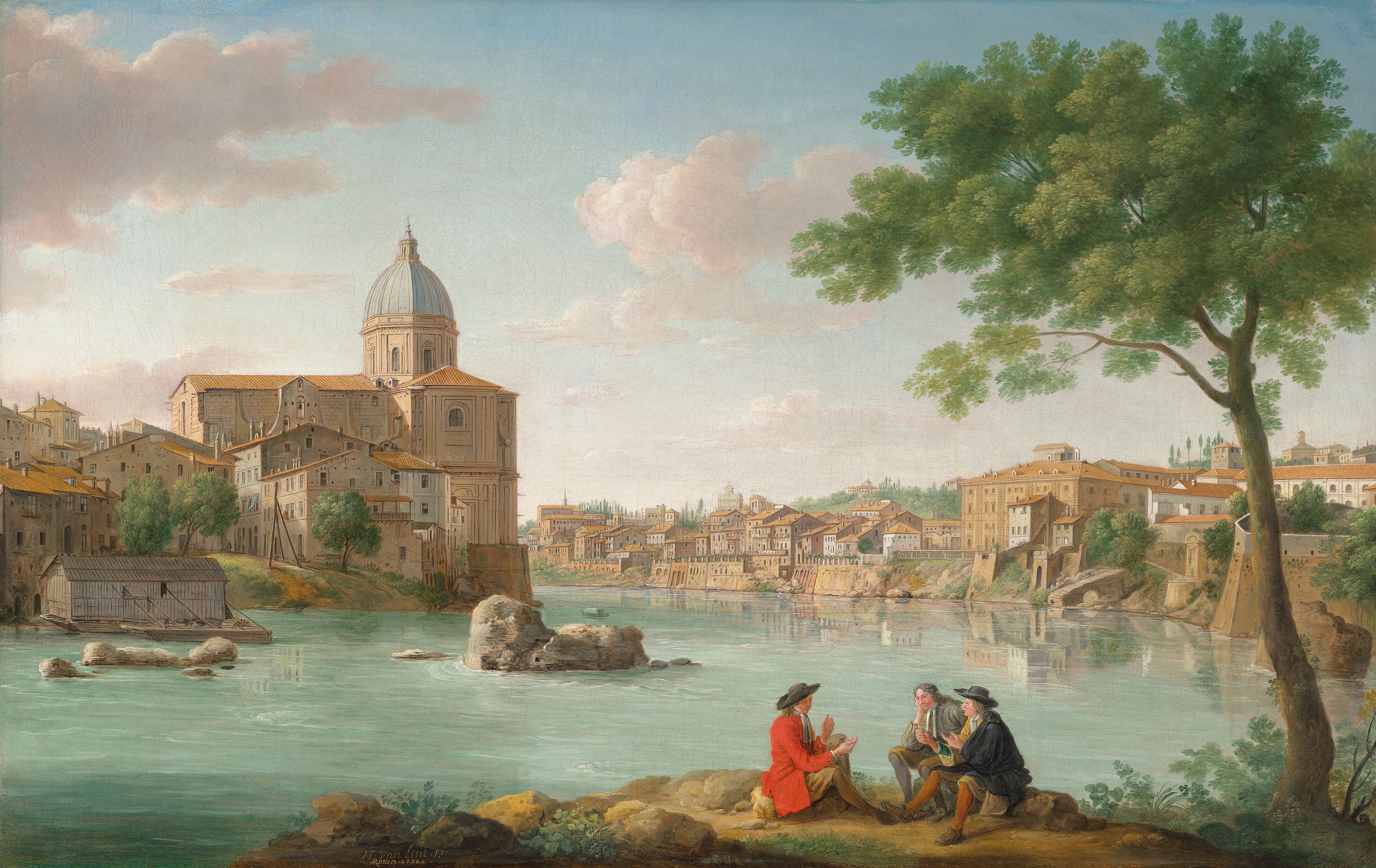
San Giovanni dei Fiorentini; likely 1723, oil on canvas, 45.8 x 71 cm.

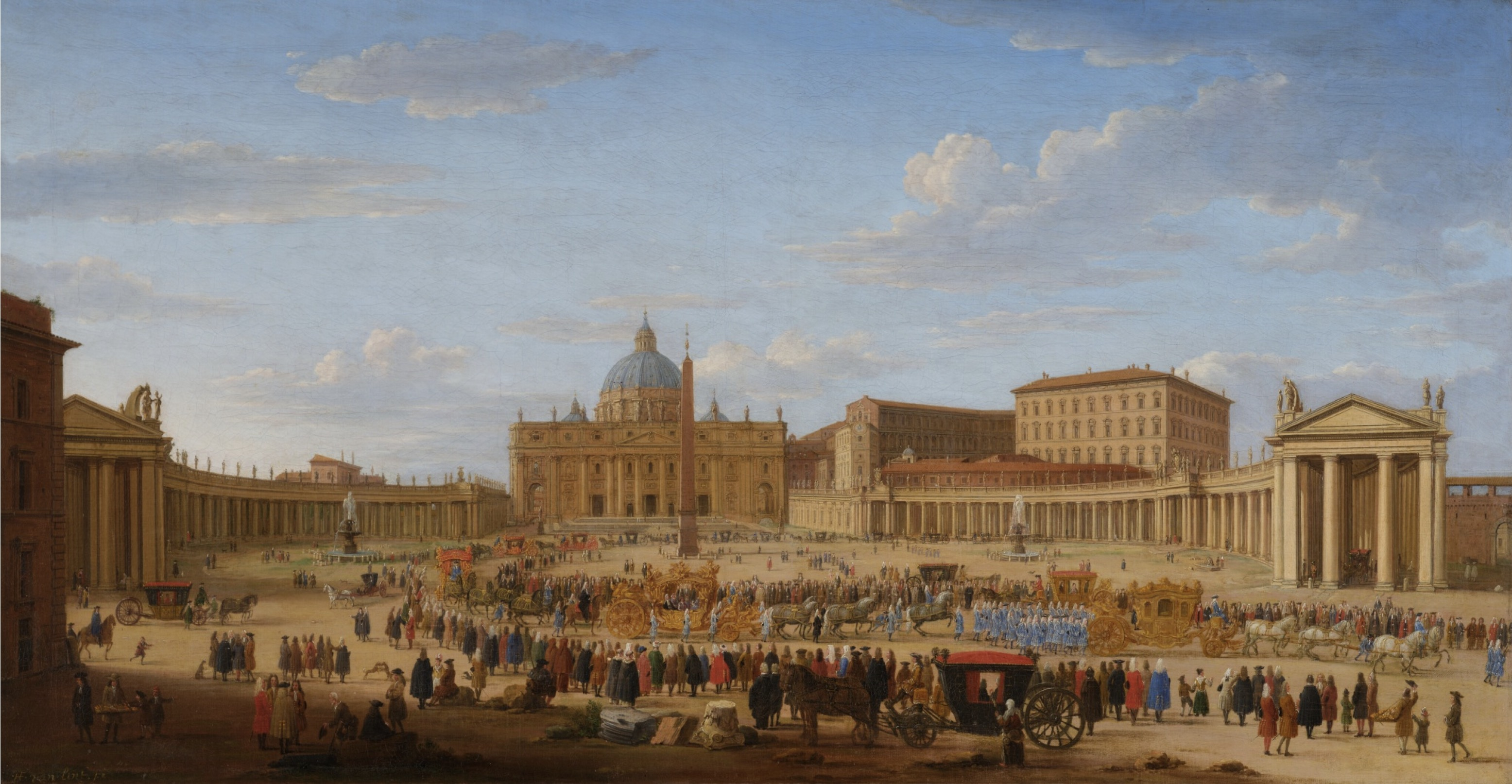
Saint Peter's Square with the Entry of the Imperial Ambassador; 1730, oil on canvas, 45.7 x 72.4 cm.

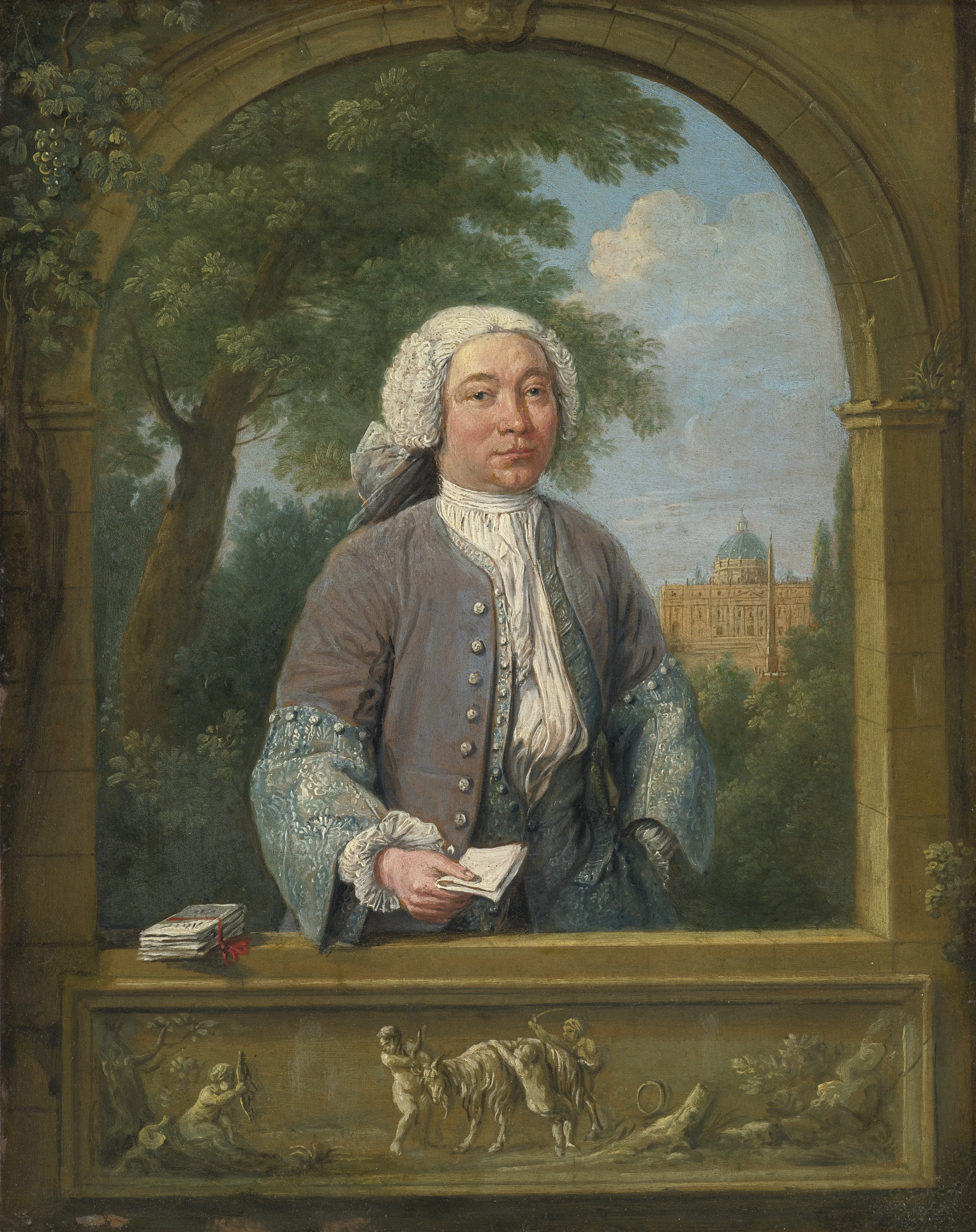
Giacomo Van Lint; 18th century, oil on panel, 29.2 x 23.5 cm.

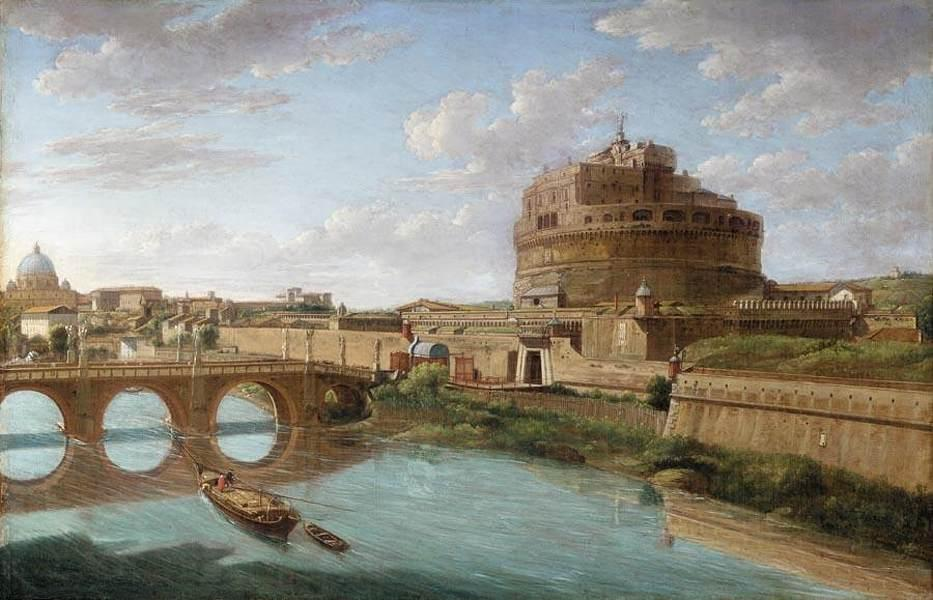
A view of The Tiber; 1734, oil on canvas, 48 x 73 cm.

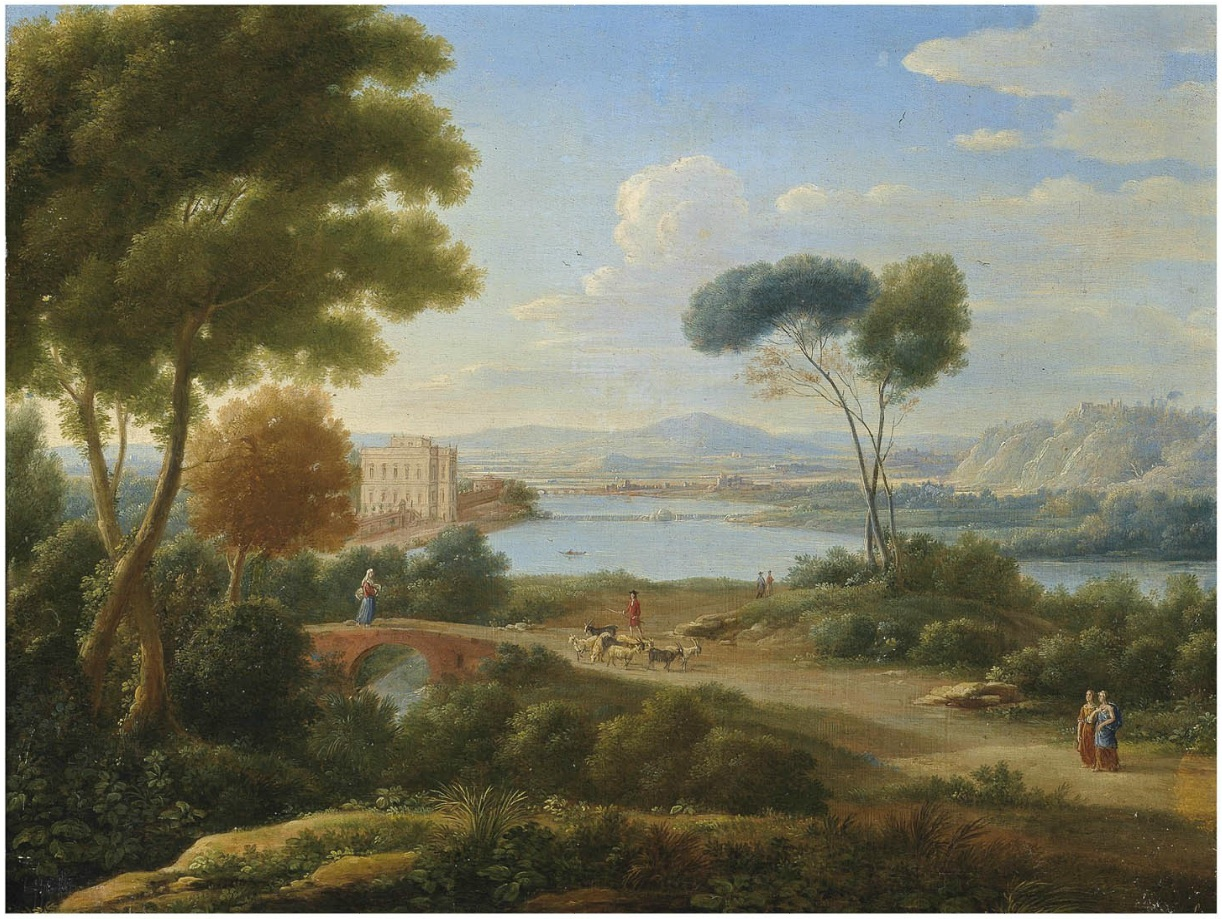
A classical river landscape with figures on a path and a palace in the distance; 1721, oil on canvas, 35.5 x 45.1 cm.

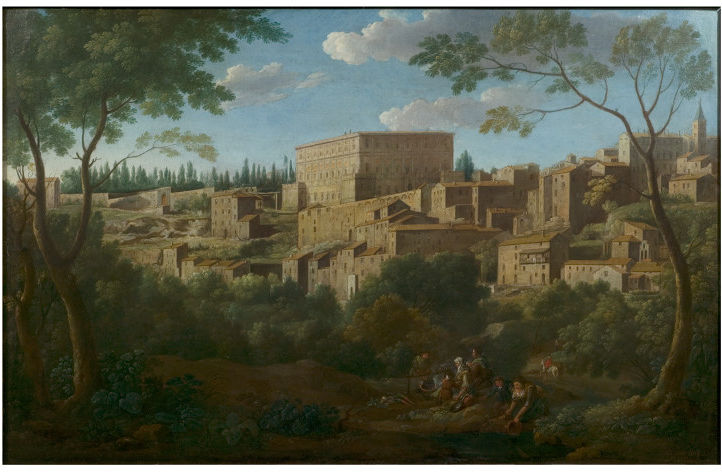
View of Tivoli; 1731, oil on canvas, 46.9 x 71.6 cm.

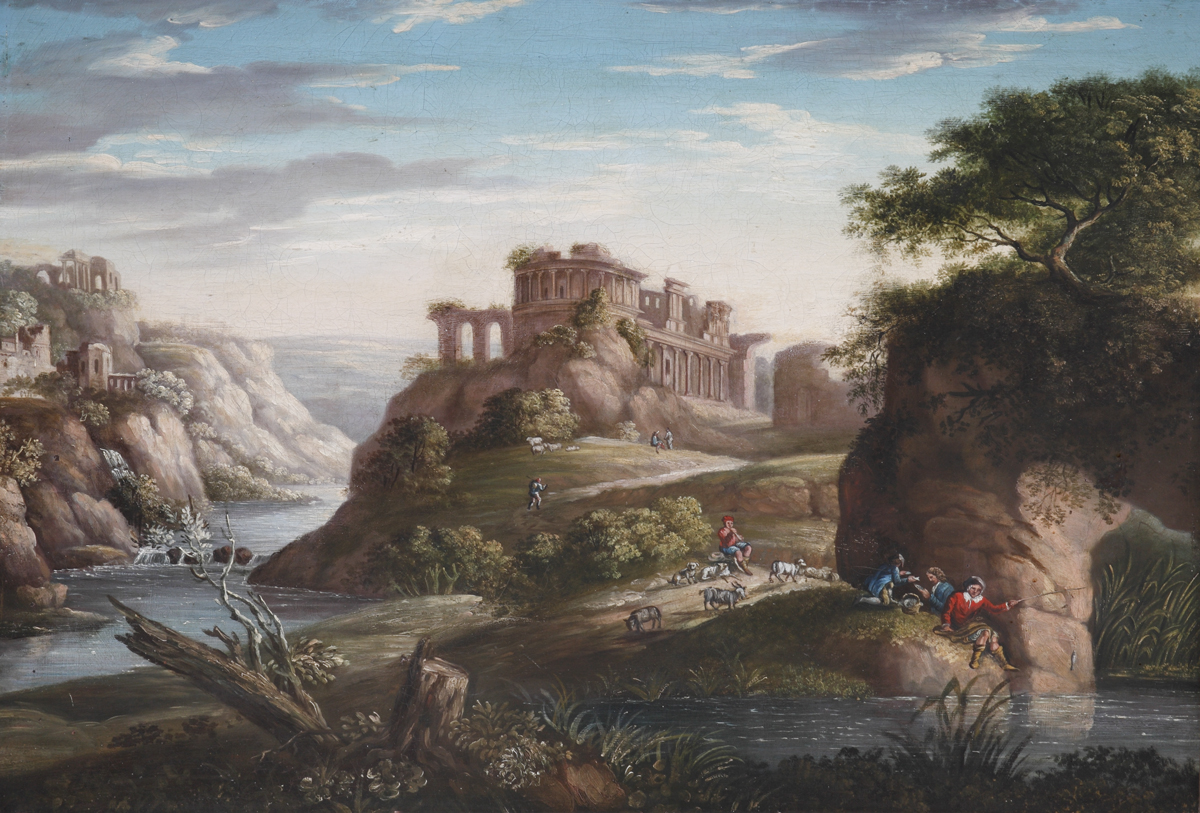
Italianate Pastoral Landscape with Capriccio Ruins; 18th century, oil on canvas, 69.5 x 89.5 cm.
