= De Lint =

De Lint may refer to:

- Charles de Lint, a Canadian author
- Derek de Lint, a Dutch actor
- De Lint (family), a Dutch patrician family.

== See also ==
- Van Lint, surname
