= Giacomo van Lint =

Italian painter (1723–1780

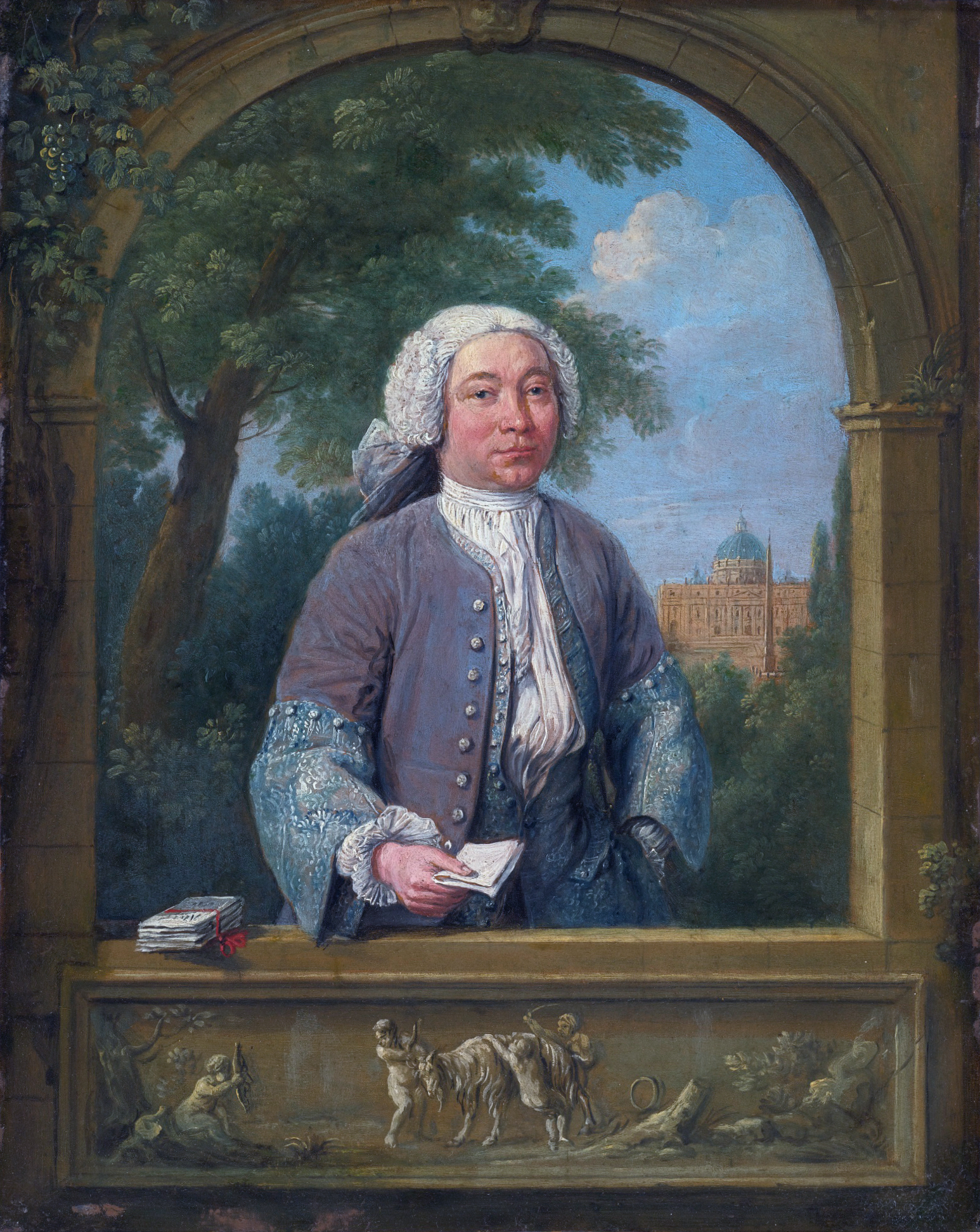
Giacomo van Lint by Hendrik Frans van Lint

Giacomo van Lint or Jacob van Lint (Rome, 8 February 1723 – Rome, 1 August 1780) was an Italian landscape and vedute painter of Flemish descent, active in Rome.

He was the son of Hendrik Frans van Lint, one of the leading landscape painters in Rome in the first half of the 18th century. Like his father, he supplied a clientele of local patrons as well as European travelers on their Grand Tour with views of the ancient and modern monuments of Rome as well as views of the Roman Campagna.

== Life ==
Giacomo van Lint was born on 8 February 1723 in Rome, where he was baptized in the church of Santa Maria del Popolo. He was the son of Hendrik Frans van Lint and his wife, Ludovica Margarete Tassel. Giacomo was the eldest of the couple's ten children, of whom only six survived.

His father was a Flemish landscape painter from Antwerp who, himself, was a son of Pieter van Lint – a painter of history paintings, genre scenes and portraits in the Flemish-Baroque style. Hendrik Frans van Lint had settled before 1700 in Rome where he had become a successful vedute painter.

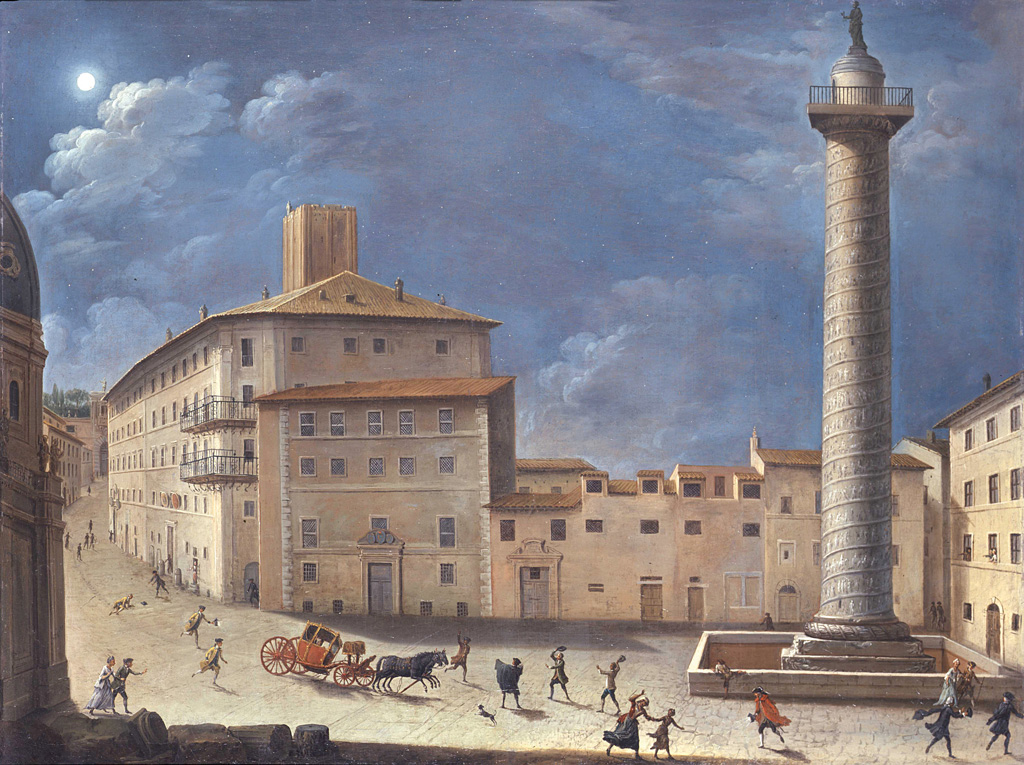
Genre scene at the Trajan's Column

Giacomo learned the art of painting from his father and became a landscape painter like his father.

Following the death of his father on 24 September 1763, Giacomo assumed the same nickname with which his father was known, i.e., Monsù Studio. This nickname was coined as a reference to his father's practice of producing many preparatory studies for his paintings. By adopting this nickname, Giacomo strengthened the link of his work with that of his father so as to exploit the popularity of his father's works. He thus hoped to be able to sell more paintings to foreigners visiting Rome, who had a preference for his small-scale views and landscapes which were easily transportable.

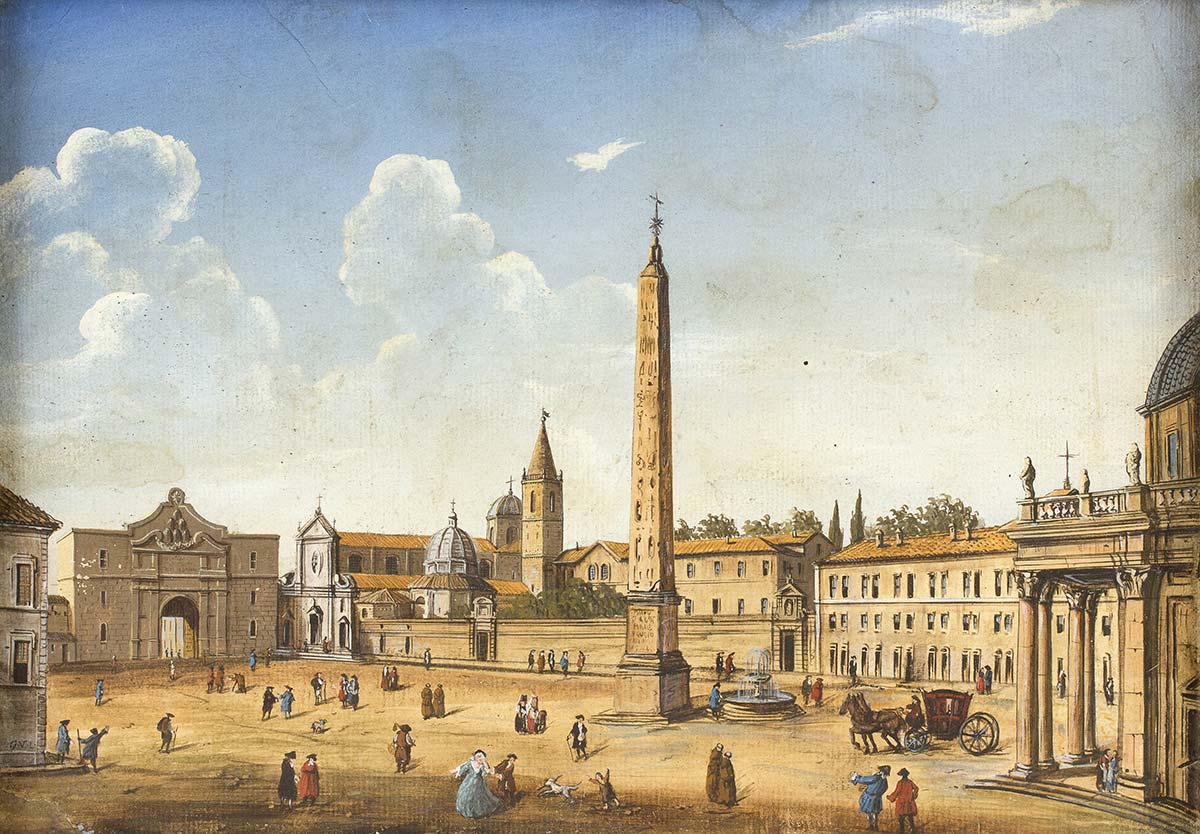
View of Piazza del Popolo, Rome

As a result, van Lint was very successful among foreigners, so much so that almost all of his paintings are found today in private European collections, particularly in the United Kingdom.

== Personal life and death ==
Giacomo never married. He resided throughout his life in a house that he and his sisters, Teresa and Maria, shared with their brother Giovanni Rocco's family, although they lived on different floors. The house was located on the Via del Corso towards Via di Ripetta.

Van Lint died in Rome on 1 August 1790.

== Work ==
Van Lint was specialized in vedute of Rome. He painted detailed topographical views of Rome in the manner of his father. He was able to create a distinct personal style. Whereas his father painted vedute of Rome and its surrounding areas as well as idealised landscapes, Giacomo responded to the demand in the market for views of the ancient and modern monuments of Rome. This explains his many views of the Quirinale Palace, Castel Sant'Angelo, the Colosseum, Saint Peter's Basilica and the Piazza Navona.

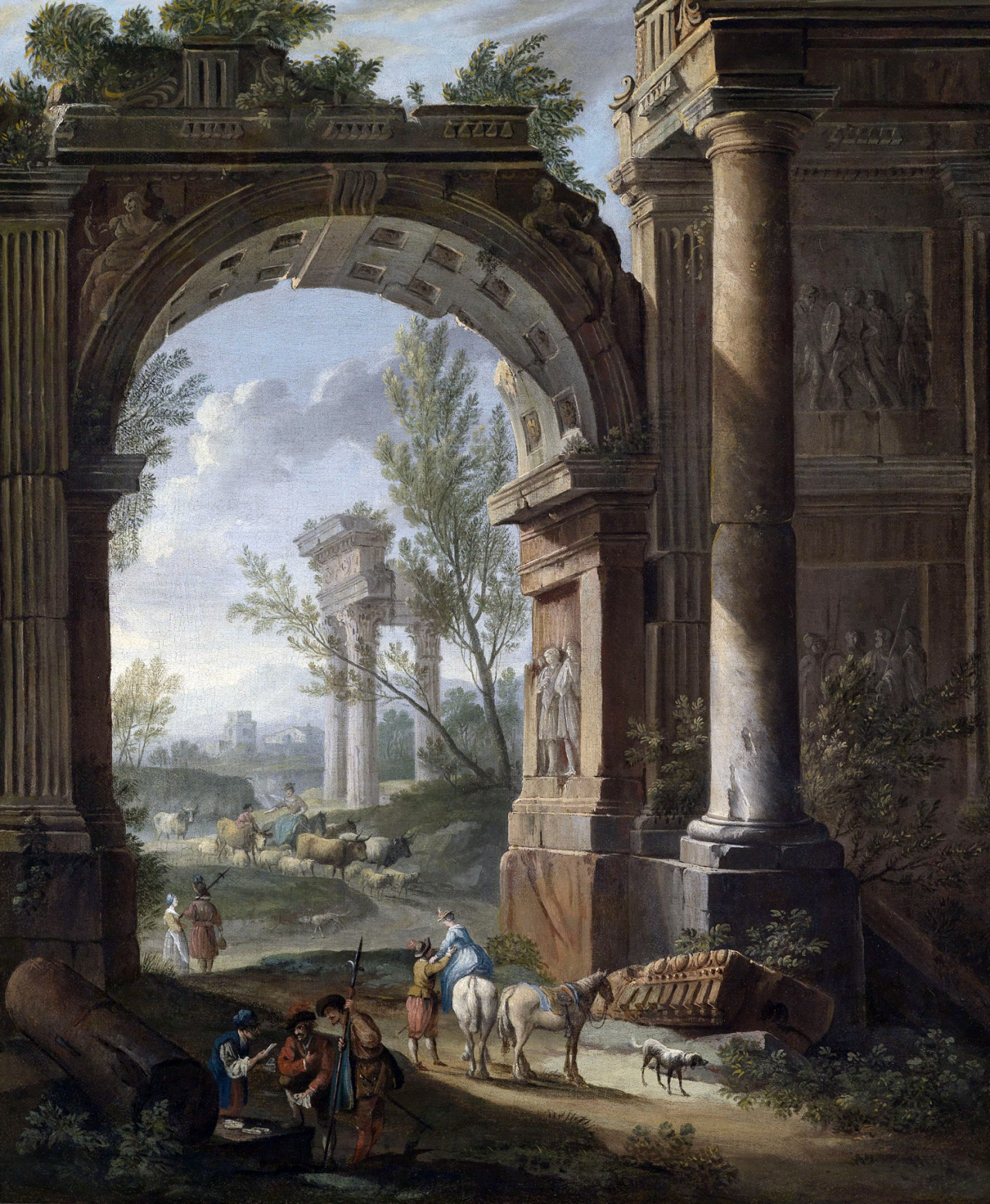
Shepherds and resting soldiers in front of an ancient city gate

Henry Hoare's print collection at Stourhead in England is thought to have been hand-coloured in a collaborative effort by Giacomo and his father Hendrik Frans van Lint. In a manuscript catalogue, the colouring of these prints is attributed to a 'Mr Studio'. The technique is consistent with Hendrik Frans van Lint's paintings but evidence, including a recorded comment regarding the 'young Studio', suggests that the colouring may have been a family enterprise.
