= Lynd =

Lynd may refer to:

== People ==
- Helen Lynd (1896–1982), American sociologist and author
- Helen Lynd (actress) (1902–1992), American stage and film actress
- James Lynd (1830–1862), American state senator
- Laurie Lynd (born 1959), Canadian screenwriter and director
- Robert Staughton Lynd (1892–1970), American sociologist and professor
- Robert Wilson Lynd (1879–1949), Irish writer
- Staughton Lynd (1929-2022), American activist
- Sylvia Lynd (1888–1952), English poet
- Theron Lynd (1920–1978), American circuit clerk, who was subject of six year of legal issues for voter discrimination
- William Earl Lynd (1955–2008), American murderer

== Places ==
=== United States ===
- Lynd, Minnesota, a small city
- Lynd Township, Lyon County, Minnesota

== Other ==
- Vesper Lynd, fictional character in the James Bond universe

== See also ==
- Lind
- Lynde
