= Richard Lindner =

Richard Lindner may refer to:

- Richard Lindner (painter) (1901–1978), German-born painter who settled in the United States
- Richard Lindner (1921–2010), American businessman of the Lindner family
