= East Deck Motel Family Resort =

- Interactive map of the East Deck Motel Family Resort area

General information
- Status: Demolished
- Location: 40 Deforest Road, Montauk, New York, U.S.
- Coordinates: 41.040463°N 71.913753°W
- Opened: 1949
- Demolished: 2016 (10 years ago)

The East Deck Motel, formerly in Ditch Plains, Suffolk County, New York in the US, was a resort establishment from 1954 to 2016. Spanning five acres of beachfront property, Amenities included a swimming pool, barbecue areas, and morning yoga sessions. The property was located one mile east of the village of Montauk and Montauk Harbor, near the Montauk Downs State Park Golf Course, restaurants, and nightlife. The motel was located near a jetty break used for surfing and fishing. Ditch Plains beach is a surfing destination on the South Fork. Fishing tours were available in Montauk Harbor nearby.

== History ==
In 1949, Sam and Bea Cox acquired the vacant five-acre lot and founded the motel. By 1954, they had relocated several cottages from Navy Road to this parcel and began leasing them, primarily to anglers. During the early 1960s, these individual cottages were joined to form a single motel, which continued to cater to the fishing community. Following the retirement of his grandparents, Steve Houseknecht operated the motel, which featured mid-century architecture.

In 1976, Steve Houseknecht married Alice Watson, who subsequently assisted with the management of the motel.

Her father, a New York City Fireman, had convinced her grandparents to buy a piece of property near Darenberg Marina in 1957. Eventually, her father and grandfather built a cottage that the extended family could use. Since then Houseknecht spent every summer in Montauk.”

The motel had 30 rooms. Following Steve Houseknecht's death in 1996, Alice Houseknecht managed the property until its sale.

In 2013, following Hurricane Sandy, the property was sold for $15 million to an LLC led by J. Darius Bikoff. The new owners proposed converting the property into a private beach club, but the project did not proceed.

In 2016, the East Deck Motel was razed to be replaced by Montauk Colony.

== See also ==
- Ditch Witch (food truck)
