= Linde =

Linde may refer to:

== Places ==
- Linde, a village in the municipality of Lindlar, Oberbergischer Kreis, North Rhine-Westphalia, Germany
- Lindes and Ramsberg Mountain District, a former district in Sweden, see Lindesberg Municipality
- Lipka, Złotów County, a village in Poland, called Linde before World War II

== Rivers ==
- Linde (Tollense), a river of Mecklenburg-Vorpommern, Germany
- Linde (Lena), a river in Sakha Republic, Russia

== Other uses ==
- Linde (surname)
- Linde plc, an international industrial gases company
- Linde Hydraulics, a manufacturer of heavy duty drive systems
- Mercedes-Benz Championship (European Tour), formerly the Linde German Masters, a professional golf tournament played in Germany

== People ==
- Fedor Linde, a russian revolutionary
- Yoseph Linde, co-inventor of the Linde–Buzo–Gray algorithm

== See also ==
- Lind (disambiguation)
- Linden (disambiguation)
- Lindner
- Lindemann (Lindeman)
