= Carl Lindner =

Carl Lindner is the name of:

- Carl Lindner Jr. (1919–2011), American businessman
- Carl Lindner III (born 1953), American businessman, son of Carl Lindner Jr.
