= Mikael Lind =

Swedish ice hockey player

- Born: February 20, 1972 (age 53) Gävle, SWE
- Height: 5 ft 10 in (178 cm)
- Weight: 191 lb (87 kg; 13 st 9 lb)
- Position: Centre
- Shot: Right
- SEL team Former teams: Brynäs IF; Timrå IK
- Playing career: 1991–2009

Mikael Lind (born February 20, 1972) is a Swedish professional ice hockey player currently with the Brynäs IF team in the Swedish Elitserien league.

== Career statistics ==
			Regular season					Playoffs
Season	Team	League	GP	G	A	Pts	PIM	GP	G	A	Pts	PIM
1989–90	Brynäs IF J18	J18 Elit	—	—	—	—	—	—	—	—	—	—
1989–90	Brynäs IF J20	Juniorserien	—	—	—	—	—	—	—	—	—	—
1990–91	Brynäs IF J20	Juniorserien	—	—	—	—	—	—	—	—	—	—
1990–91	Brynäs IF	Elitserien	7	0	0	0	0	2	0	0	0	0
1991–92	Team Gävle	Division 1	30	13	9	22	16	1	0	0	0	0
1992–93	Team Gävle	Division 1	36	19	13	32	38	—	—	—	—	—
1993–94	Team Gävle	Division 1	29	20	27	47	36	2	0	3	3	12
1993–94	Brynäs IF	Elitserien	2	0	0	0	0	—	—	—	—	—
1994–95	Brynäs IF	Elitserien	23	3	1	4	2	13	1	0	1	2
1994–95	Team Gävle	Division 1	13	2	10	12	12	—	—	—	—	—
1995–96	Brynäs IF	Elitserien	15	3	0	3	10	—	—	—	—	—
1995–96	Brynäs IF	Allsvenskan D1	10	2	2	4	2	2	0	0	0	0
1995–96	Team Gävle	Division 1	9	4	3	7	4	—	—	—	—	—
1996–97	Timrå IK	Division 1	32	25	25	50	22	2	1	2	3	2
1997–98	Timrå IK	Division 1	32	20	23	43	22	14	5	4	9	10
1998–99	Timrå IK	Division 1	41	30	31	61	26	4	1	2	3	2
1999–00	Timrå IK	Allsvenskan	41	22	32	54	46	10	2	4	6	2
2000–01	Timrå IK	Elitserien	45	12	12	24	38	—	—	—	—	—
2001–02	Timrå IK	Elitserien	44	4	15	19	22	—	—	—	—	—
2002–03	Timrå IK	Elitserien	35	9	18	27	34	10	2	4	6	8
2003–04	Brynäs IF	Elitserien	45	14	28	42	16	—	—	—	—	—
2004–05	Brynäs IF	Elitserien	50	11	27	38	24	—	—	—	—	—
2005–06	Brynäs IF	Elitserien	35	5	14	19	14	4	0	0	0	2
2006–07	Brynäs IF	Elitserien	42	14	9	23	36	7	2	2	4	8
2007–08	Brynäs IF	Elitserien	42	16	21	37	30	—	—	—	—	—
2008–09	Brynäs IF	Elitserien	18	2	3	5	10	4	0	1	1	0
Elitserien totals			403	93	148	241	236	40	5	7	12	20
Division 1 totals			222	133	141	274	176	23	7	11	18	26
