= Toe Jam Puppet Band =

American children's entertainment group

- Origin: New Bedford, Massachusetts
- Genres: Children's music
- Years active: 2001 - present
- Members: Tom Poitras; Vinny Lovegrove; Chris Waters; Brian Cass; Amy Marsden; Mike Almond; Jeff Angeley; Jeff Gobush; Meghan Barnes; Samuel Young
- Website: http://www.toejampuppetband.com

The Toe Jam Puppet Band is a children's entertainment group from New Bedford, Massachusetts. They perform throughout New England several times per week, including every Monday at Buttonwood Park Zoo in New Bedford, and played 270 times in 2007 across Massachusetts, Rhode Island, New Hampshire, Maine and New York City. Band members include co-founders Tom Poitras and Vinny Lovegrove,. The band formed in 2001 after Poitras, previously a punk rock singer with The Gluons, began writing songs for his newborn son, met Lovegrove who had been entertaining folk since 1994 with his Miracle Fish Puppet Theater. Their first CD, titled First CD, sold over 1000 copies. They released a second album, Toe Jam Dance Party, in 2003, and a third, Toe Jam in Outer Space, in 2008.

They have received a grant from the Massachusetts Society for the Prevention of Cruelty to Children for their Creative Arts Playgroup, and proceeds from the sale of their first CD went to the MSPCC.

According to the Boston Globe, they are "blazing a path through the world of family entertainment". WickedLocal said they offer "a special brand of hands-on children’s entertainment that grown-ups can actually enjoy". The Providence Journal noted that "The kids' involvement steers each show, so every performance is different."
