= Marion Lindt =

German actress from East Prussia

- Born: Königsberg, East Prussia, German Empire
- Died: 13 March 1966; Hamburg, West Germany
- Occupation: Actress

Marion Lindt (December 12, 1901 or 1908, Königsberg, East Prussia, German Empire - 13 March 1966, Hamburg, West Germany) was a German actress, radio performer, speaker, singer, and musician.

She was primarily known for her work in regional radio broadcasting in East Prussia before and during World War II. She learned to speak a wide range of German dialects and specialized in East Prussian folk theatre. One of her great lifelong patrons was the East Prussian poet Agnes Miegel (1879–1964), a Nazi Party supporter. After the war, Lindt continued her career in West Germany and authored many books, especially about East Prussian culture, cuisine, and humor.

== Early life and education ==
Marion Lindt was born in Königsberg (today Kaliningrad, Russia). She received her professional acting training at the Schauspielhaus Königsberg (Königsberg Theatre).

== Career ==
Lindt began her professional career at a young age with the Ostmarken Rundfunk in Königsberg, later known as the Reichssender Königsberg. She became one of the station's best-known voices and participated in a wide range of radio productions, including entertainment programs, radio plays, and regional dialect broadcasts.

She gained particular popularity for her portrayal of the fictional character Hanne Schneidereit, a humorous figure speaking in the East Prussian dialect, which became closely associated with Lindt's public persona.

In 1945, the new Polish and Soviet authorities in East Prussia expelled the German population there. In Hamburg she worked for the Nordwestdeutscher Rundfunk (later the Norddeutscher Rundfunk), but also received numerous assignments from Süddeutscher Rundfunk and Westdeutscher Rundfunk, and became known nationwide.

== Other work ==
In addition to acting, Lindt worked as a speaker, singer, and musician. She contributed to historical audio recordings featuring spoken word and music related to East Prussian culture and traditions.

After World War II, she continued her cultural work in West Germany. Among her later publications was a cookbook featuring East Prussian recipes combined with anecdotal reminiscences of her homeland.

== Memberships ==
According to the information in the biographical article by the German historian Alina L. Tiews (Hamburger Persönlichkeiten), Lindt was a member of the NSDAP from May 1, 1933, and was also of a number of other National Socialist organizations (the Nationalsozialistische Betriebszellenorganisation (NSBO), Kampfbund für deutsche Kultur (KfdK), Deutsche Arbeitsfront (DAF), Reichskulturkammer, the Reichsverband Deutscher Schriftsteller (1933 to 1938) and the Nationalsozialistische Volkswohlfahrt (1940 to 1944).

The German historian Ulrich Heitger, a chronicler of German broadcasting history, lamented that Lindt's life story exhibited so many gaps.

== Death ==
Marion Lindt died on 13 March 1966 in Hamburg at the age of 57. Contemporary reports state that the cause of death was a heart attack.

Sometimes she is confused with another person.

== Works (in selection) ==
- Schabber-Schabber - Hanne Schneidereit plachandert. Ostpreußischer Humor in Poesie und Prosa zusammengestellt von Marion Lindt
- (with Otto Dikreiter) Das Hausbuch des ostpreussischen Humors
- Ostpreussische Spezialitäten: Serviert, gewürzt mit Anekdoten
- Marion Lindt serviert ostpreussische Spezialitäten gewürzt mit Anekdoten
- Lustige Schabberei: Ostpreußische Mundartdichtungen
- Unsere Kinderchens: Lustige Geschichten und Gedichte in ostpreußischer Mundart
- Klops und Glumse

== Bibliography ==
- Alina L. Tiews: Marion Lindt (Hamburger Persönlichkeiten)
- Herz, Humor und Heimatliebe: Marion Lindt zum Gedenken (Obituary) (Preußische Allgemeine Zeitung, 1966) by RMW
