= 2018–19 SHL season =

- League: Swedish Hockey League
- Sport: Ice hockey
- Duration: September 2018 – March 2019; (Regular season); 16 March – 2 May 2019; (Playoffs)

Regular season
- First place: Färjestad BK
- Top scorer: Ryan Lasch (Frölunda HC)

Playoffs
- Playoffs MVP: Ryan Lasch (Frölunda HC)
- Finals champions: Frölunda HC
- Runners-up: Djurgårdens IF

SHL seasons
- 2017–18 2019–20

The 2018–19 SHL season was the 44th season of the Swedish Hockey League (SHL). The regular season began in September 2018 and ended in March 2019. It was followed by the Swedish Championship playoffs and the relegation playoffs. The league consisted of 14 teams. The only new addition for this season was Timrå IK, who replaced Karlskrona HK after defeating them in the 2018 SHL qualifiers.

Färjestad BK won the regular season, and Frölunda HC won the Swedish Championship.

== Teams ==
SHL team map

| Team | City | Arena | Capacity |
|---|---|---|---|
| Brynäs IF | Gävle | Gavlerinken Arena | 8,585 |
| Djurgårdens IF | Stockholm | Hovet | 8,094 |
| Frölunda HC | Gothenburg | Scandinavium | 12,044 |
| Färjestad BK | Karlstad | Löfbergs Arena | 8,647 |
| HV71 | Jönköping | Kinnarps Arena | 7,000 |
| Linköpings HC | Linköping | Saab Arena | 8,500 |
| Luleå HF | Luleå | Coop Norrbotten Arena | 6,300 |
| Malmö Redhawks | Malmö | Malmö Arena | 13,000 |
| Mora IK | Mora | Jalas Arena | 4,500 |
| Rögle BK | Ängelholm | Lindab Arena | 5,150 |
| Skellefteå AIK | Skellefteå | Skellefteå Kraft Arena | 6,001 |
| Timrå IK | Timrå | NHK Arena | 6,000 |
| Växjö Lakers | Växjö | Vida Arena | 5,700 |
| Örebro HK | Örebro | Behrn Arena | 5,150 |

== Regular season ==
=== Standings ===
Each team plays 52 games, playing each of the other thirteen teams four times: twice on home ice, and twice away from home. Points are awarded for each game, where three points are awarded for winning in regulation time, two points for winning in overtime or shootout, one point for losing in overtime or shootout, and zero points for losing in regulation time. At the end of the regular season, the team that finishes with the most points is crowned the league champion.

| Pos | Team | Pld | W | OTW | OTL | L | GF | GA | GD | Pts | Qualification |
|---|---|---|---|---|---|---|---|---|---|---|---|
| 1 | Färjestad BK | 52 | 28 | 6 | 5 | 13 | 165 | 114 | +51 | 101 | Qualification to Quarter-finals |
| 2 | Luleå HF | 52 | 25 | 11 | 4 | 12 | 138 | 100 | +38 | 101 | Qualification to Quarter-finals |
| 3 | Frölunda HC | 52 | 24 | 8 | 4 | 16 | 152 | 134 | +18 | 92 | Qualification to Quarter-finals |
| 4 | Djurgårdens IF | 52 | 23 | 5 | 7 | 17 | 149 | 120 | +29 | 86 | Qualification to Quarter-finals |
| 5 | Skellefteå AIK | 52 | 19 | 10 | 7 | 16 | 142 | 124 | +18 | 84 | Qualification to Quarter-finals |
| 6 | Malmö Redhawks | 52 | 21 | 8 | 3 | 20 | 136 | 125 | +11 | 82 | Qualification to Quarter-finals |
| 7 | Växjö Lakers | 52 | 22 | 3 | 10 | 17 | 123 | 120 | +3 | 82 | Qualification to Eighth-finals |
| 8 | HV71 | 52 | 24 | 1 | 6 | 21 | 136 | 125 | +11 | 80 | Qualification to Eighth-finals |
| 9 | Rögle BK | 52 | 20 | 4 | 7 | 21 | 130 | 143 | −13 | 75 | Qualification to Eighth-finals |
| 10 | Örebro HK | 52 | 16 | 7 | 7 | 22 | 130 | 146 | −16 | 69 | Qualification to Eighth-finals |
| 11 | Brynäs IF | 52 | 17 | 2 | 14 | 19 | 116 | 145 | −29 | 69 | |
| 12 | Linköpings HC | 52 | 15 | 8 | 6 | 23 | 130 | 143 | −13 | 67 | |
| 13 | Mora IK | 52 | 13 | 9 | 3 | 27 | 126 | 167 | −41 | 60 | Qualification to Relegation playoffs |
| 14 | Timrå IK | 52 | 10 | 5 | 4 | 33 | 115 | 182 | −67 | 44 | Qualification to Relegation playoffs |

Updated to match(es) played on 14 March 2019. Source: SHL.se
Rules for classification: 1) Points; 2) Goal difference; 3) Number of goals scored

=== Statistics ===
==== Scoring leaders ====
The following players led the league in points, at the conclusion of matches played on 14 March 2019. If two or more skaters are tied (i.e. same number of points, goals and played games), all of the tied skaters are shown.

| Player | Team | GP | G | A | Pts | +/– | PIM |
|---|---|---|---|---|---|---|---|
| (United States) Ryan Lasch | Frölunda HC | 46 | 12 | 38 | 50 | –11 | 18 |
| (Sweden) Joakim Lindström | Skellefteå AIK | 48 | 18 | 24 | 42 | +9 | 20 |
| (Canada) Derek Roy | Linköpings HC | 49 | 8 | 34 | 42 | +8 | 28 |
| (Finland) Jesse Virtanen | Färjestad BK | 52 | 6 | 35 | 41 | +16 | 47 |
| (Sweden) Markus Ljungh | HV71 | 52 | 16 | 24 | 40 | +7 | 8 |
| (Austria) Konstantin Komarek | Malmö Redhawks | 49 | 13 | 26 | 39 | +2 | 18 |
| (Sweden) Oscar Möller | Skellefteå AIK | 51 | 19 | 19 | 38 | +11 | 8 |
| (Sweden) Ted Brithén | Rögle BK | 46 | 12 | 26 | 38 | +7 | 12 |
| (United States) Ryan Gunderson | Brynäs IF | 52 | 8 | 30 | 38 | +2 | 18 |
| (Sweden) Oskar Steen | Färjestad BK | 46 | 17 | 20 | 37 | +17 | 49 |

==== Leading goaltenders ====
The following goaltenders led the league in goals against average, provided that they have played at least 40% of their team's minutes, at the conclusion of matches played on 14 March 2019.

| Player | Team | GP | TOI | W | T | L | GA | SO | Sv% | GAA |
|---|---|---|---|---|---|---|---|---|---|---|
| (Sweden) Joel Lassinantti | Luleå HF | 42 | 2498:16 | 26 | 6 | 10 | 70 | 5 | 93.10 | 1.68 |
| (Sweden) Adam Reideborn | Djurgårdens IF | 39 | 2317:50 | 22 | 5 | 12 | 72 | 3 | 92.90 | 1.86 |
| (Sweden) Viktor Fasth | Växjö Lakers | 35 | 2081:39 | 16 | 3 | 15 | 69 | 4 | 91.88 | 1.99 |
| (Sweden) Adam Werner | Färjestad BK | 26 | 1485:13 | 15 | 3 | 6 | 50 | 3 | 92.63 | 2.02 |
| (Sweden) Markus Svensson | Färjestad BK | 31 | 1644:35 | 17 | 2 | 9 | 57 | 5 | 91.97 | 2.08 |
| (Sweden) Johan Mattsson | Frölunda HC | 28 | 1586:07 | 17 | 1 | 8 | 56 | 1 | 91.82 | 2.12 |
| (Sweden) Oscar Alsenfelt | Malmö Redhawks | 37 | 2119:04 | 18 | 5 | 11 | 76 | 1 | 92.39 | 2.15 |
| (Lithuania) Mantas Armalis | Skellefteå AIK | 32 | 1901:16 | 14 | 5 | 13 | 69 | 4 | 91.67 | 2.18 |
| (Sweden) Jonas Gunnarsson | HV71 | 34 | 1999:11 | 15 | 2 | 17 | 78 | 6 | 90.98 | 2.34 |
| (Sweden) Jonas Gustavsson | Linköpings HC | 36 | 2038:53 | 18 | 2 | 14 | 85 | 2 | 91.67 | 2.50 |

== Playoffs ==
Ten teams qualify for the playoffs: the top six teams in the regular season have a bye to the quarterfinals, while teams ranked seventh to tenth meet each other (7 versus 10, 8 versus 9) in a preliminary playoff round.

=== Playoff bracket ===
In the first round the 7th-ranked team will meet the 10th-ranked team and the 8th-ranked team will meet the 9th-ranked team for a place in the second round. In the second round, the top-ranked team will meet the lowest-ranked winner of the first round, the 2nd-ranked team will face the other winner of the first round, the 3rd-ranked team will face the 6th-ranked team, and the 4th-ranked team will face the 5th-ranked team. In the third round, the highest remaining seed is matched against the lowest remaining seed. In each round the higher-seeded team is awarded home advantage. In the first round the meetings are played as best-of-three series and the rest is best-of-seven series that follows an alternating home team format: the higher-seeded team will play at home for games 1 and 3 (plus 5 and 7 if necessary), and the lower-seeded team will be at home for game 2 and 4 (plus 6 if necessary).

Eighth-finals; Swedish: Åttondelsfinal
7 | **Växjö Lakers** | **2**
10 | Örebro HK | 0
8 | **HV71** | **2**
9 | Rögle BK | 0

Quarter-finals; Swedish: Kvartsfinal
1 | **Färjestad BK** | **4**
8 | HV71 | 3
2 | **Luleå HF** | **4**
7 | Växjö Lakers | 1
3 | **Frölunda HC** | **4**
6 | Malmö Redhawks | 1
4 | **Djurgårdens IF** | **4**
5 | Skellefteå AIK | 2

Semi-finals
2 | Luleå HF | 1
3 | **Frölunda HC** | **4**
(Pairings are re-seeded after the first and second round)
1 | Färjestad BK | 3
4 | **Djurgårdens IF** | **4**

Finals
3 | **Frölunda HC** | **4**
4 | Djurgårdens IF | 2

=== Eighth-finals ===
The teams ranked 7 and 10, and the teams ranked 8 and 9, respectively, will face each other in a best-of-three series in order to qualify for the quarter-finals. The better-ranked teams in the two series will receive home advantage, i.e. two home games, if necessary. The two winners will take the two remaining quarter-final spots.

==== (7) Växjö Lakers vs. (10) Örebro HK ====
| 16 March | **Växjö Lakers** | 3–2 | **OT** | Örebro HK | Vida Arena | Recap |
| Filip Cederqvist (1) – 18:17 | | First period | | 19:26 – Patrik Virta (1) |
| Kris Versteeg (1; PPG) – 08:38 | | Second period | | 04:22 – Tyson Spink (1) |
| No scoring | | Third period | | No scoring |
| Nichlas Hardt (1) – 5:33 | | First overtime period | | No scoring |
| Viktor Fasth (19 shots / 17 saves) | | Goalie stats | | Jhonas Enroth (30 shots / 27 saves) |

| 18 March | Örebro HK | **2–4** | **Växjö Lakers** | Behrn Arena | Recap |
| Nick Ebert (1; PPG) – 5:08 | | **First period** | 8:00 – Tuomas Kiiskinen (1) |
| No scoring | | **Second period** | 10:25 – Roman Horák (1); 13:44 – Kris Versteeg (2; PPG) |
| Shane Harper (1; PPG) – 7:28 | | **Third period** | 8:02 – Kris Versteeg (3) |
| Jhonas Enroth (21 saves / 25 shots) | | **Goalie stats** | Viktor Fasth (28 saves / 30 shots) |

| **Växjö Lakers won series 2–0** |

==== (8) HV71 vs. (9) Rögle BK ====
| 16 March | **HV71** | **4–1** | Rögle BK | Kinnarps Arena | Recap |
| Simon Önerud (1) – 07:53; Didrik Strömberg (1) – 12:11; Simon Önerud (2) – 14:38 | | **First period** | 18:15 – Éric Gélinas (1) |
| Anton Bengtsson (1) – 09:01 | | **Second period** | No scoring |
| No scoring | | **Third period** | No scoring |
| Jonas Gunnarsson (29 shots / 28 saves) | | **Goalie stats** | Justin Pogge (31 shots / 27 saves) |

| 18 March | Rögle BK | 3–4 | **OT** | **HV71** | Lindab Arena | Recap |
| Ted Brithén (1) – 0:39; Daniel Zaar (1) – 11:11; Daniel Widing (1; PPG) – 14:49 | | First period | | No scoring |
| No scoring | | Second period | | 2:45 – David Gustafsson (1); 11:29 – Markus Ljungh (1); 15:38 – Christoffer Törngren (1) |
| No scoring | | Third period | | No scoring |
| No scoring | | First overtime period | | 11:34 – Markus Lauridsen (1) |
| Justin Pogge (26 saves / 30 shots) | | Goalie stats | | Jonas Gunnarsson (38 saves / 41 shots) |

| **HV71 won series 2–0** |

=== Quarter-finals ===
==== (1) Färjestad BK vs. (8) HV71 ====
Game 5 of this series was the second-longest Elitserien/SHL playoff game, with Oskar Steen's game-winning goal coming after 57:01 of overtime.

| 22 March | Färjestad BK | 1–2 | **OT** | **HV71** | Löfbergs Arena | Recap |
| No scoring | | First period | | No scoring |
| No scoring | | Second period | | No scoring |
| Joakim Nygård (1; PPG) – 12:24 | | Third period | | 19:10 – Martin Thörnberg (1) |
| No scoring | | First overtime period | | 17:45 – Robin Figren (1; PPG) |
| Adam Werner (24 shots / 22 saves) | | Goalie stats | | Jonas Gunnarsson (37 shots / 36 saves) |

| 24 March | HV71 | **1–3** | **Färjestad BK** | Kinnarps Arena | Recap |
| Andreas Thuresson (1) – 5:16 | | **First period** | No scoring |
| No scoring | | **Second period** | 8:17 – Jesper Olofsson (1) |
| No scoring | | **Third period** | 7:34 – Daniel Viksten (1; PPG); 8:56 – Sebastian Erixon (1) |
| Jonas Gunnarsson (20 saves / 23 shots) | | **Goalie stats** | Markus Svensson (27 saves / 28 shots) |

| 26 March | Färjestad BK | **2–3** | **HV71** | Löfbergs Arena | Recap |
| Alexander Johansson (1) – 02:44 | | **First period** | 16:48 – Christoffer Törngren (2); 17:59 – Isac Brännström (1) |
| No scoring | | **Second period** | 00:32 – Christoffer Törngren (3) |
| Gustav Rydahl (1) – 14:01 | | **Third period** | No scoring |
| Markus Svensson (23 shots / 20 saves) | | **Goalie stats** | Jonas Gunnarsson (32 shots / 30 saves) |

| 28 March | HV71 | **1–3** | **Färjestad BK** | Kinnarps Arena | Recap |
| Anton Bengtsson (2) – 18:17 | | **First period** | No scoring |
| No scoring | | **Second period** | 10:55 – Linus Johansson (1); 17:59 – Jesse Virtanen (1) |
| No scoring | | **Third period** | 19:57 – Gustav Rydahl (2; SHG/ENG) |
| Jonas Gunnarsson (21 shots / 19 saves) | | **Goalie stats** | Markus Svensson (28 shots / 27 saves) |

| 30 March | **Färjestad BK** | 3–2 | **3OT** | HV71 | Löfbergs Arena | Recap |
| No scoring | | First period | | No scoring |
| No scoring | | Second period | | 01:59 – Sebastian Wännström (1) |
| Michael Lindqvist (1; PPG) – 00:39; Linus Johansson (2; SHG) – 04:48 | | Third period | | 19:40 – Sebastian Wännström (2; EA) |
| Oskar Steen (1) – 17:01 | | Third overtime period | | No scoring |
| Markus Svensson (36 shots / 34 saves) | | Goalie stats | | Jonas Gunnarsson (58 shots / 55 saves) |

| 1 April | **HV71** | **5–3** | Färjestad BK | Kinnarps Arena | Recap |
| Isac Brännström (2) – 17:16; Mikko Lehtonen (1; PPG) – 19:53 | | **First period** | 1:20 – Sebastian Erixon (2) |
| Max Wennlund (1) – 17:18 | | **Second period** | 11:19 – Joakim Nygård (2; PPG); 16:38 – Jesper Olofsson (2) |
| Didrik Strömberg (2) – 2:10; Anton Bengtsson (3; ENG) – 19:04 | | **Third period** | No scoring |
| Jonas Gunnarsson (18 shots / 15 saves) | | **Goalie stats** | Markus Svensson (38 shots / 34 saves) |

| 3 April | **Färjestad BK** | **3–2** | HV71 | Löfbergs Arena | Recap |
| Joakim Nygård (3) – 4:27 | | **First period** | 9:05 – Joakim Andersson (1) |
| Michael Lindqvist (2) – 9:11; Johan Ryno (1; PPG) – 14:08 | | **Second period** | 12:29 – Simon Önerud (3) |
| No scoring | | **Third period** | No scoring |
| Markus Svensson (14 shots / 12 saves) | | **Goalie stats** | Jonas Gunnarsson (31 shots / 28 saves) |

| **Färjestad BK won series 4–3** |

==== (2) Luleå HF vs. (7) Växjö Lakers ====
| 22 March | **Luleå HF** | **3–1** | Växjö Lakers | Coop Norrbotten Arena | Recap |
| No scoring | | **First period** | No scoring |
| Emil Larsson (1) – 13:14 | | **Second period** | 16:03 – Linus Fröberg (1) |
| Einar Emanuelsson (1) – 18:34; Niklas Olausson (1; ENG) – 18:50 | | **Third period** | No scoring |
| Joel Lassinantti (15 saves / 16 shots) | | **Goalie stats** | Viktor Fasth (27 saves / 29 shots) |

| 24 March | Växjö Lakers | 4–5 | **OT** | **Luleå HF** | Vida Arena | Recap |
| Linus Fröberg (2; PPG) – 7:01 | | First period | | 0:50 – Robin Kovacs (1) |
| Liam Reddox (1) – 0:57 | | Second period | | 15:07 – Robin Kovacs (2) |
| Brendan Shinnimin (1) – 1:57; Dominik Bokk (1) – 16:45 | | Third period | | 4:54 – Emil Larsson (2); 18:45 – Emil Larsson (3; EA) |
| No scoring | | First overtime period | | 4:36 – Niklas Olausson (2) |
| Viktor Fasth (19 saves / 24 shots) | | Goalie stats | | Joel Lassinantti (34 saves / 38 shots) |

| 26 March | **Luleå HF** | **4–0** | Växjö Lakers | Coop Norrbotten Arena | Recap |
| Niklas Olausson (3; PPG) – 16:41; Isac Lundeström (1) – 19:38 | | **First period** | No scoring |
| Jesper Sellgren (1; PPG) – 06:13 | | **Second period** | No scoring |
| Carl Mattsson (1; PPG) – 18:22 | | **Third period** | No scoring |
| Joel Lassinantti (31 shots / 31 saves) | | **Goalie stats** | Viktor Andrén (23 shots / 19 saves) |

| 28 March | **Växjö Lakers** | 3–2 | **OT** | Luleå HF | Vida Arena | Recap |
| Brendan Shinnimin (2) – 16:05 | | First period | | No scoring |
| No scoring | | Second period | | 17:09 – Erik Gustafsson (1) |
| Brendan Shinnimin (3; PPG) – 06:49 | | Third period | | 04:04 – Petter Emanuelsson (1) |
| Dominik Bokk (2) – 06:25 | | First overtime period | | No scoring |
| Viktor Andrén (24 shots / 22 saves) | | Goalie stats | | Joel Lassinantti (34 shots / 31 saves) |

| 30 March | **Luleå HF** | **4–1** | Växjö Lakers | Coop Norrbotten Arena | Recap |
| Erik Gustafsson (2) – 14:53 | | **First period** | No scoring |
| Erik Gustafsson (3; PPG) – 19:54 | | **Second period** | No scoring |
| Petter Emanuelsson (2) – 03:03; Emil Larsson (4; PPG) – 18:36 | | **Third period** | 19:33 – Kris Versteeg (4) |
| Joel Lassinantti (19 shots / 18 saves) | | **Goalie stats** | Viktor Andrén (28 shots / 24 saves) |

| **Luleå HF won series 4–1** |

==== (3) Frölunda HC vs. (6) Malmö Redhawks ====
| 23 March | **Frölunda HC** | **4–0** | Malmö Redhawks | Scandinavium | Recap |
| Pathrik Westerholm (1; PPG) – 9:03; Sebastian Stålberg (1) – 11:45; Rhett Rakhshani (1) – 13:40; Rhett Rakhshani (2; PPG) – 19:50 | | **First period** | No scoring |
| No scoring | | **Second period** | No scoring |
| No scoring | | **Third period** | No scoring |
| Johan Mattsson (26 saves / 26 shots) | | **Goalie stats** | Oscar Alsenfelt (25 saves / 29 shots) |

| 25 March | **Malmö Redhawks** | **3–2** | Frölunda HC | Malmö Arena | Recap |
| Lars Bryggman (1) – 10:13 | | **First period** | No scoring |
| Jens Olsson (1) – 08:49 | | **Second period** | 09:13 – Joel Lundqvist (1); 19:47 – Ryan Lasch (1; PPG) |
| Fredrik Händemark (1) – 05:08 | | **Third period** | No scoring |
| Oscar Alsenfelt (22 shots / 20 saves) | | **Goalie stats** | Johan Mattsson (14 shots / 11 saves) |

| 27 March | **Frölunda HC** | **7–2** | Malmö Redhawks | Scandinavium | Recap |
| Simon Hjalmarsson (1) – 01:53; Anders Grönlund (1) – 06:24; Anders Grönlund (2) – 16:16 | | **First period** | No scoring |
| Chay Genoway (1) – 04:24; Simon Hjalmarsson (2; PPG) – 07:37 | | **Second period** | 03:57 – Marcus Björk (1; PPG) |
| Joel Lundqvist (2) – 02:40; Patrik Carlsson (1; SHG) – 05:06 | | **Third period** | 06:39 – Johan Olofsson (1; PPG) |
| Johan Mattsson (24 shots / 22 saves) | | **Goalie stats** | Lars Volden (34 shots / 27 saves) |

| 29 March | Malmö Redhawks | **3–5** | **Frölunda HC** | Malmö Arena | Recap |
| No scoring | | **First period** | 14:31 – Joel Lundqvist (3; PPG); 16:48 – Ryan Lasch (2) |
| Frederik Storm (1; PPG) – 06:03; Malte Setkov (1) – 18:24 | | **Second period** | 12:19 – Jacob Peterson (1) |
| Konstantin Komarek (1) – 01:54 | | **Third period** | 14:24 – Chay Genoway (2); 17:34 – Simon Hjalmarsson (3) |
| Oscar Alsenfelt (25 shots / 20 saves) | | **Goalie stats** | Johan Mattsson (30 shots / 27 saves) |

| 31 March | **Frölunda HC** | **4–1** | Malmö Redhawks | Scandinavium | Recap |
| No scoring | | **First period** | No scoring |
| Chay Genoway (3) – 1:29; Brandon Gormley (1) – 10:05; Chay Genoway (4) – 17:36 | | **Second period** | 8:59 – Carl Persson (1) |
| Max Friberg (1; ENG) – 19:55 | | **Third period** | No scoring |
| Johan Mattsson (35 shots / 34 saves) | | **Goalie stats** | Oscar Alsenfelt (28 shots / 25 saves) |

| **Frölunda HC won series 4–1** |

==== (4) Djurgårdens IF vs. (5) Skellefteå AIK ====
| 23 March | Djurgårdens IF | **0–2** | **Skellefteå AIK** | Hovet | Recap |
| No scoring | | **First period** | No scoring |
| No scoring | | **Second period** | 11:58 – Robin Álvarez (1; PPG); 19:17 – Bud Holloway (1) |
| No scoring | | **Third period** | No scoring |
| Adam Reideborn (19 saves / 21 shots) | | **Goalie stats** | Mantas Armalis (31 saves / 31 shots) |

| 25 March | Skellefteå AIK | **3–6** | **Djurgårdens IF** | Skellefteå Kraft Arena | Recap |
| Oscar Möller (1; PPG) – 08:31; Oscar Möller (2; PPG) – 11:22 | | **First period** | 04:33 – Emil Bemström (1; PPG); 07:41 – Sebastian Strandberg (1; SHG); 18:24 – Daniel Brodin (1) |
| No scoring | | **Second period** | 07:23 – Petteri Wirtanen (1) |
| Mathis Olimb (1) – 08:57 | | **Third period** | 14:33 – Olle Alsing (1); 19:14 – Mattias Guter (1) |
| Mantas Armalis (12 shots / 9 saves); Gustaf Lindvall (15 shots / 12 saves) | | **Goalie stats** | Adam Reideborn (35 shots / 32 saves) |

| 27 March | **Djurgårdens IF** | **3–1** | Skellefteå AIK | Hovet | Recap |
| Dick Axelsson (1) – 16:24; Sebastian Strandberg (2) – 18:51 | | **First period** | 09:01 – Albin Eriksson (1; PPG) |
| No scoring | | **Second period** | No scoring |
| Dennis Svensson (1) – 17:09 | | **Third period** | No scoring |
| Adam Reideborn (29 shots / 28 saves) | | **Goalie stats** | Mantas Armalis (15 shots / 12 saves) |

| 29 March | Skellefteå AIK | **2–4** | **Djurgårdens IF** | Skellefteå Kraft Arena | Recap |
| No scoring | | **First period** | No scoring |
| Oscar Möller (3) – 09:21 | | **Second period** | 04:43 – Marcus Davidsson (1); 12:23 – Axel Jonsson-Fjällby (1); 17:14 – Daniel Brodin (2; PPG) |
| Bud Holloway (2) – 03:49 | | **Third period** | 11:09 – Axel Jonsson-Fjällby (2) |
| Gustaf Lindvall (24 shots / 20 saves) | | **Goalie stats** | Adam Reideborn (32 shots / 30 saves) |

| 31 March | Djurgårdens IF | **2–3** | **Skellefteå AIK** | Hovet | Recap |
| No scoring | | **First period** | No scoring |
| No scoring | | **Second period** | 10:49 – Joakim Lindström (1; PPG); 13:14 – Andreas Wingerli (1; SHG) |
| Robin Norell (1) – 3:08; Olle Alsing (2; EA) – 18:56 | | **Third period** | 0:56 – Joakim Lindström (2; PPG) |
| Adam Reideborn (18 shots / 15 saves) | | **Goalie stats** | Gustaf Lindvall (22 shots / 20 saves) |

| 2 April | Skellefteå AIK | **1–4** | **Djurgårdens IF** | Skellefteå Kraft Arena | Recap |
| Joakim Lindström (3) – 6:40 | | **First period** | No scoring |
| No scoring | | **Second period** | 8:56 – Emil Bemström (2); 18:51 – Linus Hultström (1) |
| No scoring | | **Third period** | 4:12 – Marcus Davidsson (2); 18:13 – Sebastian Strandberg (3; ENG) |
| Mantas Armalis (34 shots / 31 saves) | | **Goalie stats** | Adam Reideborn (28 shots / 27 saves) |

| **Djurgårdens IF won series 4–2** |

=== Semi-finals ===
==== (1) Färjestad BK vs. (4) Djurgårdens IF ====
| 6 April | **Färjestad BK** | **5–2** | Djurgårdens IF | Löfbergs Arena | Recap |
| Jesse Virtanen (2; PPG) – 11:08; Joakim Nygård (4) – 13:41 | | **First period** | No scoring |
| Jesse Virtanen (3) – 07:52; Daniel Viksten (2; PPG) – 11:34 | | **Second period** | 18:39 – Sebastian Strandberg (4) |
| Martin Johansson (1; ENG) – 18:34 | | **Third period** | 05:17 – Axel Jonsson-Fjällby (3) |
| Markus Svensson (28 shots / 26 saves) | | **Goalie stats** | Adam Reideborn (24 shots / 20 saves) |

| 8 April | **Djurgårdens IF** | **5–3** | Färjestad BK | Hovet | Recap |
| No scoring | | **First period** | No scoring |
| Linus Hultström (2; PPG) – 16:55 | | **Second period** | 4:46 – Michael Lindqvist (3; PPG); 11:20 – Marcus Nilsson (1; PPG) |
| Emil Bemström (3) – 3:38; Linus Hultström (3; PPG) – 5:47; Robin Norell (2) – 12:12; Dick Axelsson (2; ENG) – 18:55 | | **Third period** | 19:57 – Michael Lindqvist (4; PPG) |
| Adam Reideborn (25 shots / 22 saves) | | **Goalie stats** | Markus Svensson (26 shots / 22 saves) |

| 10 April | Färjestad BK | **1–2** | **Djurgårdens IF** | Löfbergs Arena | Recap |
| No scoring | | **First period** | No scoring |
| Ilari Melart (1) – 08:41 | | **Second period** | No scoring |
| No scoring | | **Third period** | 16:16 – Axel Jonsson-Fjällby (4); 18:06 – Dick Axelsson (3) |
| Markus Svensson (30 shots / 28 saves) | | **Goalie stats** | Adam Reideborn (31 shots / 30 saves) |

| 12 April | **Djurgårdens IF** | **3–1** | Färjestad BK | Hovet | Recap |
| Sebastian Strandberg (5) – 8:11; Mattias Guter (2) – 17:02 | | **First period** | No scoring |
| No scoring | | **Second period** | No scoring |
| Daniel Brodin (3) – 5:58 | | **Third period** | 8:32 – Martin Johansson (2) |
| Adam Reideborn (30 shots / 29 saves) | | **Goalie stats** | Markus Svensson (18 shots / 15 saves) |

| 14 April | **Färjestad BK** | **8–2** | Djurgårdens IF | Löfbergs Arena | Recap |
| Johan Ryno (2) – 2:34; Marcus Nilsson (2) – 2:57; Johan Ryno (3) – 9:18 | | **First period** | No scoring |
| Johan Ryno (4) – 5:18; Jesse Virtanen (4) – 11:09; Oskar Steen (2) – 11:20; Aleksander Reichenberg (1) – 18:46 | | **Second period** | 9:51 – Dick Axelsson (4; PPG) |
| Joakim Nygård (5; PPG) – 16:10 | | **Third period** | 18:38 – Mattias Guter (3) |
| Markus Svensson (18 shots / 16 saves) | | **Goalie stats** | Adam Reideborn (15 shots / 11 saves); Robin Jensen (16 shots / 12 saves) |

| 16 April | Djurgårdens IF | **1–6** | **Färjestad BK** | Ericsson Globe | Recap |
| No scoring | | **First period** | 1:32 – Marcus Nilsson (3) |
| No scoring | | **Second period** | 10:18 – Sebastian Erixon (3); 12:36 – Marcus Nilsson (4; PPG); 13:00 – Jesper Olofsson (3; PS); 16:14 – Ilari Melart (2) |
| Daniel Brodin (4) – 2:01 | | **Third period** | 4:33 – Daniel Viksten (3) |
| Robin Jensen (18 shots / 12 saves) | | **Goalie stats** | Markus Svensson (26 shots / 25 saves) |

| 18 April | Färjestad BK | **1–4** | **Djurgårdens IF** | Löfbergs Arena | Recap |
| Michael Lindqvist (5) – 1:18 | | **First period** | No scoring |
| No scoring | | **Second period** | 12:19 – Sebastian Strandberg (6; PPG) |
| No scoring | | **Third period** | 2:42 – Dick Axelsson (5); 15:04 – Sebastian Strandberg (7); 17:42 – Axel Jonsson-Fjällby (5; ENG) |
| Markus Svensson (24 shots / 21 saves) | | **Goalie stats** | Adam Reideborn (26 shots / 25 saves) |

| **Djurgårdens IF won series 4–3** |

==== (2) Luleå HF vs. (3) Frölunda HC ====
| 7 April | Luleå HF | 3–4 | **OT** | **Frölunda HC** | Coop Norrbotten Arena | Recap |
| No scoring | | First period | | No scoring |
| Nils Lundkvist (1) – 9:54 | | Second period | | 6:42 – Jacob Peterson (2); 18:04 – Joel Mustonen (1); 19:55 – Patrik Carlsson (2) |
| Daniel Sondell (1; (PPG) – 16:57; Jesper Sellgren (2; EA) – 18:57 | | Third period | | No scoring |
| No scoring | | First overtime period | | 17:00 – Rhett Rakhshani (3) |
| Joel Lassinantti (37 shots / 33 saves) | | Goalie stats | | Johan Mattsson (31 shots / 28 saves) |

| 9 April | **Frölunda HC** | **2–0** | Luleå HF | Scandinavium | Recap |
| No scoring | | **First period** | No scoring |
| Jonathan Sigalet (1) – 03:09 | | **Second period** | No scoring |
| Ponthus Westerholm (1) – 08:28 | | **Third period** | No scoring |
| Johan Mattsson (25 saves / 25 shots) | | **Goalie stats** | Joel Lassinantti (22 saves / 20 shots) |

| 11 April | **Luleå HF** | **3–1** | Frölunda HC | Coop Norrbotten Arena | Recap |
| No scoring | | **First period** | No scoring |
| No scoring | | **Second period** | 07:23 – Max Friberg (2) |
| Jack Connolly (1) – 04:45; Jesper Sellgren (3) – 17:47; Karl Fabricius (1; ENG) – 18:28 | | **Third period** | No scoring |
| Joel Lassinantti (20 shots / 19 saves) | | **Goalie stats** | Johan Mattsson (39 shots / 37 saves) |

| 13 April | **Frölunda HC** | **3–0** | Luleå HF | Scandinavium | Recap |
| Rhett Rakhshani (4) – 7:25 | | **First period** | No scoring |
| Samuel Fagemo (1; PPG) – 6:22 | | **Second period** | No scoring |
| Jacob Moverare (1; ENG) – 18:30 | | **Third period** | No scoring |
| Johan Mattsson (18 shots / 18 saves) | | **Goalie stats** | Joel Lassinantti (18 shots / 16 saves) |

| 15 April | Luleå HF | **2–6** | **Frölunda HC** | Coop Norrbotten Arena | Recap |
| No scoring | | **First period** | 13:09 – Anders Grönlund (3); 18:40 – Samuel Fagemo (2) |
| No scoring | | **Second period** | 16:38 – Ryan Lasch (3); 18:08 – Max Friberg (3) |
| Isac Lundeström (2; SHG) – 04:02; Petter Emanuelsson (3; PPG) – 15:51 | | **Third period** | 02:01 – Simon Hjalmarsson (4; PPG); 16:39 – Anders Grönlund (4; SHG/ENG) |
| Joel Lassinantti (31 shots / 25 saves) | | **Goalie stats** | Johan Mattsson (26 shots / 24 saves) |

| **Frölunda HC won series 4–1** |

=== Finals ===
==== (3) Frölunda HC vs. (4) Djurgårdens IF ====
| 21 April | **Frölunda HC** | **5–3** | Djurgårdens IF | Scandinavium | Recap |
| Jacob Peterson (3) – 12:02 | | **First period** | No scoring |
| Jacob Moverare (2) – 03:09; Chay Genoway (5; PPG) – 13:18; Joel Lundqvist (4; PPG) – 19:32 | | **Second period** | 02:13 – Marcus Davidsson (2); 04:25 – Linus Hultström (4) |
| Samuel Fagemo (3; ENG) – 19:37 | | **Third period** | 03:27 – Dick Axelsson (6) |
| Johan Mattsson (31 shots / 28 saves) | | **Goalie stats** | Adam Reideborn (23 shots / 19 saves) |

| 23 April | **Djurgårdens IF** | **5–1** | Frölunda HC | Ericsson Globe | Recap |
| Olle Alsing (3; PPG) – 16:38 | | **First period** | No scoring |
| Axel Jonsson-Fjällby (6) – 10:05; Emil Bemström (4) – 11:10 | | **Second period** | No scoring |
| Jakob Lilja (1) – 2:24; Linus Hultström (5) – 13:15 | | **Third period** | 7:10 – Max Friberg (4) |
| Adam Reideborn (21 shots / 20 saves) | | **Goalie stats** | Johan Mattsson (32 shots / 27 saves); Johan Gustafsson (3 shots / 3 saves) |

| 25 April | **Frölunda HC** | **5–2** | Djurgårdens IF | Scandinavium | Recap |
| Jacob Moverare (3) – 1:07 | | **First period** | 8:00 – Olle Alsing (4) |
| Brandon Gormley (2; PPG) – 0:29; Samuel Fagemo (4) – 2:15; Joel Lundqvist (5; PPG) – 12:59 | | **Second period** | 13:38 – Jakob Lilja (2) |
| Ryan Lasch (4; PPG) – 2:43 | | **Third period** | No scoring |
| Johan Mattsson (10 shots / 9 saves); Johan Gustafsson (12 shots / 11 saves) | | **Goalie stats** | Adam Reideborn (33 shots / 28 saves) |

| 27 April | **Djurgårdens IF** | **3–2** | Frölunda HC | Hovet | Recap |
| No scoring | | **First period** | 7:52 – Max Friberg (5; SHG) |
| Mattias Guter (4; PS) – 15:10; Jacob Josefson (1) – 17:00 | | **Second period** | 11:27 – Simon Hjalmarsson (5; PPG) |
| Niclas Bergfors (1) – 8:26 | | **Third period** | No scoring |
| Adam Reideborn (24 shots / 22 saves) | | **Goalie stats** | Johan Gustafsson (21 shots / 18 saves) |

| 30 April | **Frölunda HC** | **6–2** | Djurgårdens IF | Scandinavium | Recap |
| Joel Lundqvist (6; PPG) – 10:34 | | **First period** | No scoring |
| Ryan Lasch (5; PPG) – 0:52; Joel Mustonen (2) – 2:30; Jacob Peterson (4) – 10:17 | | **Second period** | No scoring |
| Samuel Fagemo (5; PPG) – 13:42; Max Friberg (6; ENG) – 18:25 | | **Third period** | 3:03 – Jakob Lilja (3; PPG); 4:35 – Niclas Bergfors (2; PPG) |
| Johan Gustafsson (26 shots / 24 saves) | | **Goalie stats** | Adam Reideborn (19 shots / 15 saves); Robin Jensen (12 shots / 11 saves) |

| 2 May | Djurgårdens IF | **2–6** | **Frölunda HC** | Ericsson Globe | Recap |
| Axel Jonsson-Fjällby (7) – 9:34 | | **First period** | 1:55 – Samuel Fagemo (6; PPG); 7:09 – Ryan Lasch (6); 10:37 – Max Friberg (7; SHG) |
| No scoring | | **Second period** | 5:52 – Mats Rosseli Olsen (1) |
| Emil Bemström (5) – 6:03 | | **Third period** | 17:11 – Max Friberg (8); 18:49 – Mats Rosseli Olsen (2; SHG, ENG) |
| Adam Reideborn (26 shots / 21 saves) | | **Goalie stats** | Johan Gustafsson (33 shots / 31 saves) |

| **Frölunda HC won series 4–2** |

=== Statistics ===
==== Playoff scoring leaders ====
The following players led the league in points, at the conclusion of matches played on 2 May 2019. If two or more skaters are tied (i.e. same number of points, goals and played games), all of the tied skaters are shown.

| Player | Team | GP | G | A | Pts | +/– | PIM |
|---|---|---|---|---|---|---|---|
| (United States) Ryan Lasch | Frölunda HC | 16 | 6 | 13 | 19 | +7 | 4 |
| (United States) Rhett Rakhshani | Frölunda HC | 16 | 4 | 13 | 17 | +5 | 6 |
| (Sweden) Max Friberg | Frölunda HC | 16 | 8 | 8 | 16 | +10 | 8 |
| (Sweden) Dick Axelsson | Djurgårdens IF | 19 | 6 | 8 | 14 | –1 | 58 |
| (Sweden) Simon Hjalmarsson | Frölunda HC | 15 | 5 | 9 | 14 | +4 | 8 |
| (Sweden) Patrik Carlsson | Frölunda HC | 16 | 2 | 12 | 14 | +11 | 2 |
| (Sweden) Joel Lundqvist | Frölunda HC | 16 | 6 | 7 | 13 | +6 | 35 |
| (Sweden) Michael Lindqvist | Färjestad BK | 14 | 5 | 8 | 13 | +7 | 28 |
| (Canada) Chay Genoway | Frölunda HC | 16 | 5 | 8 | 13 | +9 | 4 |
| (Sweden) Linus Hultström | Djurgårdens IF | 19 | 5 | 8 | 13 | –3 | 10 |

==== Playoff leading goaltenders ====
These are the leaders in GAA and save percentage among goaltenders who played at least 40% of the team's minutes. The table is sorted by GAA, and the criteria for inclusion are bolded. Updated as of 2 May 2019.

| Player | Team | GP | TOI | W | L | GA | SO | SV% | GAA |
|---|---|---|---|---|---|---|---|---|---|
| (Sweden) Johan Mattsson | Frölunda HC | 13 | 748:15 | 9 | 3 | 25 | 3 | 92.67 | 2.00 |
| (Sweden) Jonas Gunnarsson | HV71 | 9 | 618:25 | 5 | 4 | 21 | 0 | 92.76 | 2.04 |
| (Sweden) Markus Svensson | Färjestad BK | 13 | 823:39 | 7 | 6 | 30 | 0 | 91.10 | 2.19 |
| (Sweden) Joel Lassinantti | Luleå HF | 10 | 617:31 | 5 | 5 | 23 | 1 | 91.32 | 2.23 |
| (Lithuania) Mantas Armalis | Skellefteå AIK | 5 | 254:17 | 2 | 2 | 11 | 1 | 90.35 | 2.60 |

== SHL awards ==
Guldhjälmen: Jacob Josefson, Djurgårdens IF
Guldpucken:
Honken Trophy: Adam Reideborn, Djurgårdens IF
Håkan Loob Trophy: Emil Bemström, Djurgårdens IF
Rookie of the Year: Emil Bemström, Djurgårdens IF
Salming Trophy: Erik Gustafsson, Luleå HF
Stefan Liv Memorial Trophy: Ryan Lasch, Frölunda HC
Guldpipan: Mikael Sjöqvist

== Attendances ==
The SHL clubs by average home league attendance in the 2018–19 season:

| # | Club | Average |
|---|---|---|
| 1 | Frölunda HC | 10,071 |
| 2 | Djurgårdens IF | 7,355 |
| 3 | Färjestad BK | 7,231 |
| 4 | Malmö Redhawks | 6,888 |
| 5 | HV71 | 6,550 |
| 6 | Linköpings HC | 6,079 |
| 7 | Luleå HF | 5,363 |
| 8 | Brynäs IF | 5,231 |
| 9 | Örebro HK | 5,178 |
| 10 | Växjö Lakers | 4,691 |
| 11 | Skellefteå AIK | 4,523 |
| 12 | Rögle BK | 4,424 |
| 13 | Mora IK | 4,070 |
| 14 | Timrå IK | 3,932 |
