= 2019 Sweden Hockey Games =

2019 Beijer Hockey Games (Euro Hockey Tour)
Tournament details
- Host countries: Sweden; Russia
- Cities: Johanneshov; Yaroslavl
- Venues: 2 (in 2 host cities)
- Dates: 7–10 February 2019
- Teams: 4

Final positions
- Champions: Czech Republic (2nd title)
- Runners-up: Russia
- Third place: Sweden
- Fourth place: Finland

Tournament statistics
- Games played: 6
- Goals scored: 33 (5.5 per game)
- Attendance: 34,550 (5,758 per game)
- Scoring leader: (Czech Republic) Jan Kovář (4 points)

Official website
- swehockey

The 2019 Beijer Hockey Games was played between 7 and 10 February 2019. The Czech Republic, Finland, Sweden and Russia played a round-robin for a total of three games per team and six games in total, one game was played in Yaroslavl, Russia and five games in Johanneshov, Sweden. Czech Republic won the tournament. The tournament was part of 2018–19 Euro Hockey Tour.

== Standings ==
Pos	Team	Pld	W	OTW	OTL	L	GF	GA	GD	Pts
1	Czech Republic	3	2	0	0	1	9	6	+3	6
2	Russia	3	1	1	0	1	6	3	+3	5
3	Sweden	3	1	0	1	1	10	12	−2	4
4	Finland	3	0	1	1	1	8	10	−2	3

Source: swehockey

== Games ==
All times are local. Stockholm – (Central European Time – UTC+1) Yaroslavl – (Eastern European Time – UTC+2)

7 February 2019; 17:30	Russia	3-2 GWS (1-1, 0-0, 1-1) (OT: 0–0) (SO: 1–0)	Finland	Arena 2000, Yaroslavl; Attendance: 9,046

Game reference

Ilya Konovalov
Goalies
Veini Vehviläinen
Referees:
(Czech Republic) Vladimir Pešina
(Czech Republic) Oldřich Hejduk
Linesmen:
(Russia) Dmitry Shishlo
(Russia) Nikita Shalagin

	0-1	00:28 – Ojamäki (Junttila, Lehtonen)
04:06 – Mikheyev (Zernov, Shumakov)	1-1
44:05 – Mikheyev	2-1
	2-2	59:51 – Lehtonen (Nättinen, Eronen)

M.Ilya (miss)
D.Kagarlitsky
V.Shipachyov (miss)
S.Shumakov (miss)
K.Okulov (miss)
D.Kagarlitsky
D.Kagarlitsky (miss)
Ilya.Mikheyev
D.Kagarlitsky
Shootout
J.Pesonen (miss)
N.Ojamäki (miss)
J.Tyrväinen
A.Kalapudas (miss)
V.Leskinen (miss)
O.Kaski
J.Nättinen (miss)
O.Kaski
J.Tyrväinen (miss)
8 min
Penalties
8 min
31
Shots
23

7 February 2019; 19:00	Czech Republic	5-2 (0-1, 2-0, 3-1)	Sweden	Hovet, Johanneshov; Attendance: 6,377

Game reference

Simon Hrubec
Goalies
Magnus Hellberg
Referees:
(Finland) Joonas Kova
(Finland) Kristian Vikman
Linesmen:
(Sweden) Johan Löfgren
(Sweden) Daniel Persson

	0-1	02:25 – Bemström (Holm, Rasmussen)
27:10 – Kvapil (Kundratek)	1-1
36:33 – Kovář (Holik)	2-1
46:44 – Kovář (Gulas)	3-1
50:59 – Kovář (Zatovic, Zámorský)	4-1
57:33 – Sekac (Kovář)	5-1
	5-2	58:02 – Davidsson (Dahlbeck, Johansson)

10 min
Penalties
33 min
24
Shots
20

9 February 2019; 12:00	Finland	1-3 (0-0, 0-2, 1-1)	Czech Republic	Hovet, Johanneshov; Attendance: 1,891

Game reference

Rasmus Tirronen
Goalies
Roman will
Referees:
(Finland) Anssi Salonen
(Finland) Lassi Heikkinen
Linesmen:
(Sweden) Henrik Pihlblad
(Norway) Alexander Waldejer

	0-1	29:56 – Holik
	0-2	34:00 – Zohorna (Zohorna)
	0-3	45:12 – Sekac (Kundratek)
48:00 – Pokka (Leskinen)	1-3

8 min
Penalties
33 min
18
Shots
22

9 February 2019; 19:15	Sweden	4-2 (0-0, 2-0, 2-2)	Russia	Hovet, Johanneshov; Attendance: 7,720

Game reference

Adam Reideborn
Goalies
Igor Bobkov
Referees:
(Finland) Joonas Kova
(Finland) Kristian Vikman
Linesmen:
(Sweden) Tobias Nordlander
(Sweden) Andreas Malmqvist

22:42 – Lindqvist (Nilsson, Bromé)	1-0
31:38 – Larsson (Sylvegård, Händemark)	2-0
	2-1	40:25 – Nikontsev (Shipachyov, Vasilevsky)
	2-2	50:02 – Mikheyev
52:37 – Lundeström (Lilja)	3-2
59:48 – Händemark (Larsson)	4-2

12 min
Penalties
8 min
25
Shots
34

10 February 2019; 12:00	Russia	3-1 (0-0, 2-1, 1-0)	Czech Republic	Hovet, Johanneshov; Attendance: 1,732

Game reference

Ilya Konovalov
Goalies
Simon Hrubec
Referees:
(Russia) Mikael Nord
(Russia) Marcus Linde
Linesmen:
(Sweden) Tobias Nordlander
(Sweden) Andreas Malmqvist

	0-1	34:53 – Kuzmenko
28:44 – Zohorna (Zámorský, Koblizek)	1-1
34:53 – Kuzmenko (Okulov, Bereglazov)	2-1
53:52 – Kadeikin (Rafikov, Alekseyev)	3-1

6 min
Penalties
8 min
25
Shots
13

10 February 2019; 15:30	Sweden	4-5 GWS (1-0, 1-2, 2-2) (OT: 0–0) (SO: 0–1)	Finland	Hovet, Johanneshov; Attendance: 7,784

Game reference

Adam Reideborn
Goalies
Veini Vehviläinen
Referees:
(Russia) Evgeny Romasko
(Russia) Iurii Oskirko
Linesmen:
(Sweden) Andreas Malmqvist
(Sweden) Ludvig Lundgren

05:41 – Bemström (Nygård, Rasmussen)	1-0
	1-1	20:24 – Tyrväinen (Leskinen)
27:43 – Lundeström (Persson, Lindqvist)	2-1
	2-2	31:50 – Ojamäki (Leskinen)
	2-3	42:43 – Ojamäki
	2-4	45:55 – Suomi (Lehtonen)
50:54 – Nygård (Persson, Dahlbeck)	3-4
54:52 – Bemström (Rasmussen, Sylvegård)	4-4

J.Davidsson (miss)
M.Lindqvist (miss)
E.Bemström (miss)
J.Persson. (miss)
Shootout
O.Kaski
J.Tyrväinen
N.Ojamäki (miss)
2 min
Penalties
4 min
21
Shots
21

== Scoring leaders ==
Pos	Player	Country	GP	G	A	Pts	+/−	PIM	POS
1	Jan Kovář	Czech Republic	3	3	1	4	+2	25	LW
2	Ilya Mikheyev	Russia	3	3	0	3	+3	0	LW
2	Niko Ojamäki	Finland	3	3	0	3	+3	0	RW
4	Emil Bemström	Sweden	3	3	0	3	+3	2	CE
5	Mikko Lehtonen	Finland	3	1	2	3	+3	0	LD

GP = Games played; G = Goals; A = Assists; Pts = Points; +/− = Plus/minus; PIM = Penalties in minutes; POS = Position
Source: swehockey

== Goaltending leaders ==
Pos	Player	Country	TOI	GA	GAA	Sv%	SO
1	Ilya Konovalov	Russia	125:00	3	1.44	91.67	0
2	Šimon Hrubec	Czech Republic	119:50	5	2.50	88.89	0
3	Adam Reideborn	Sweden	124:53	6	2.88	88.89	0
4	Veini Vehviläinen	Finland	128:47	6	2.80	88.24	0

TOI = Time on ice (minutes:seconds); SA = Shots against; GA = Goals against; GAA = Goals Against Average; Sv% = Save percentage; SO = Shutouts
Source: swehockey
