= Marcus Ersson =

Swedish professional ice hockey player

- Born: 27 September 1997 (age 27); Gävle, Sweden
- Height: 6 ft 2 in (188 cm)
- Weight: 201 lb (91 kg; 14 st 5 lb)
- Position: Defense
- Shoots: Left
- SHL team: Brynäs IF
- Playing career: 2014–present

Marcus Ersson (born 27 September 1997) is a Swedish professional ice hockey player. He is currently playing with Brynäs IF of the Swedish Swedish Hockey League (SHL).

== Playing career ==
Ersson began playing hockey as a youth for Brynäs IF in the 2012–13 season where he played in their under-18 and under-20 teams. In the 2015–16 season, Ersson made his debut in professional hockey, playing 16 games for Brynäs IF of the Swedish Hockey League.

== Career statistics ==
			Regular season					Playoffs
Season	Team	League	GP	G	A	Pts	PIM	GP	G	A	Pts	PIM
2014–15	Brynäs IF	J20	7	0	0	0	2	—	—	—	—	—
2015–16	Brynäs IF	J20	34	8	16	24	38	4	3	1	4	0
2015–16	Brynäs IF	SHL	16	0	0	0	6	—	—	—	—	—
2016–17	Brynäs IF	J20	36	10	13	23	50	2	0	0	0	2
2016–17	Brynäs IF	SHL	20	0	1	1	4	10	0	1	1	0
2017–18	Brynäs IF	J20	1	0	0	0	2	—	—	—	—	—
2017–18	Brynäs IF	SHL	38	1	1	2	18	8	0	1	1	2
2017–18	Almtuna IS	Allsv	1	0	0	0	0	—	—	—	—	—
2018–19	Brynäs IF	J20	3	1	2	3	0	—	—	—	—	—
2018–19	Brynäs IF	SHL	44	2	0	2	10	—	—	—	—	—
2019–20	Brynäs IF	J20	3	0	2	2	4	—	—	—	—	—
2019–20	Brynäs IF	SHL	22	1	0	1	6	—	—	—	—	—
2019–20	Västerviks IK	Allsv	3	0	1	1	4	—	—	—	—	—
SHL totals			140	4	2	6	44	18	0	2	2	2
