= Linus Hultström =

Swedish ice hockey player

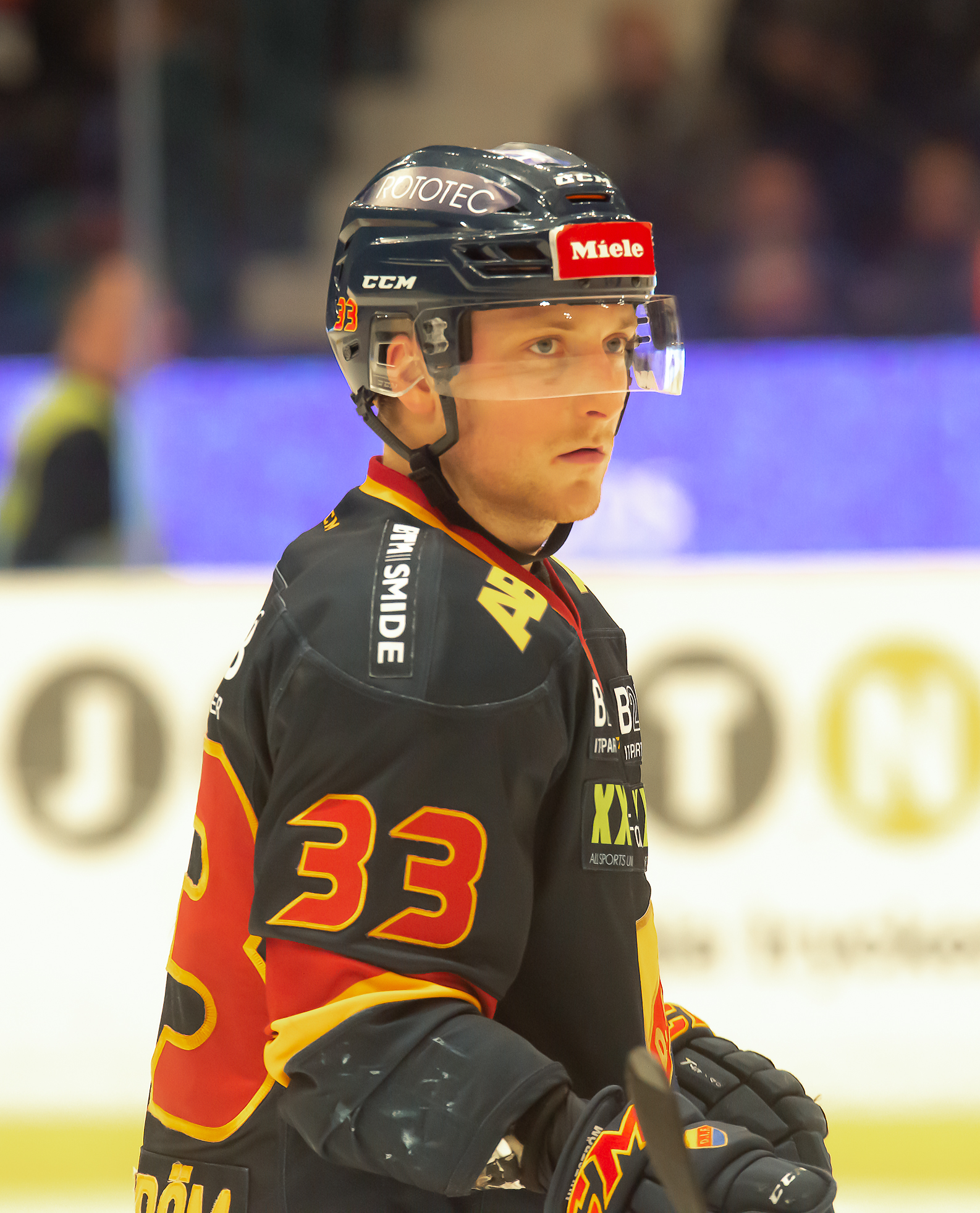
- Born: December 9, 1992 (age 33) Vimmerby, Sweden
- Height: 5 ft 10 in (178 cm)
- Weight: 183 lb (83 kg; 13 st 1 lb)
- Position: Defense
- Shoots: Right
- NL team Former teams: EHC Biel; Linköping HC; Leksands IF; Djurgårdens IF; HC Vityaz; Metallurg Magnitogorsk
- National team: Sweden
- NHL draft: Undrafted
- Playing career: 2010–present

Linus Hultström (born December 9, 1992) is a Swedish professional ice hockey defenceman. He is currently signed under contract with EHC Biel of the National League (NL).

== Playing career ==
A product of Vimmerby HC, Hultström joined the youth ranks of Linköpings HC in 2008. He made his debut in Sweden's top-flight Elitserien with the club's men's team during the 2009–10 Elitserien season. In October 2014, he signed with another Elitserien team, Leksands IF, before moving on to Djurgårdens IF, where he inked a three-year deal in April 2015.

Hultström made 60 appearances for the Stockholm-based team during the 2015–16 season, tallying 15 goals and 28 assists. He also saw action in eight contests of the Champions Hockey League (two goals, four assists).

On May 3, 2016, he put pen to paper on a two-year, entry-level contract with the Florida Panthers of the National Hockey League (NHL). He was returned on loan to Djurgårdens IF for the first season of his contract with the Panthers, in 2016–17. He remained in the SHL for the entire duration of his contract with the Panthers, eventually signing a two-year contract extension with Djurgårdens IF on January 10, 2017.

As a free agent following the shortened 2019–20 season due to the COVID-19, Hultström left Sweden for the first time in his professional career by agreeing to a two-year contract with Russian club, HC Vityaz of the KHL, on May 2, 2020. In the 2020–21 season, Hultström quickly adapted to the new league, continuing to produce on the blueline in posting seven goals and 23 points through 53 regular season games.

On May 1, 2021, Hultström left Vityaz after just one year, remaining in the KHL by agreeing to a one-year contract with Metallurg Magnitogorsk. During his lone season with Metallurg in 2021–22, Hultström recorded a career-high of 24 assists, in posting 28 points through 48 regular season games. In the post-season, he added a further 7 points from the blueline before losing in the Gagarin Cup finals to CSKA Moscow.

As a free agent, Hultström left the KHL and returned to his original club, Linköping HC of the SHL, signing a four-year contract on May 4, 2022.

On 11 April 2025, Hultström was signed to a two-year contract to join Swiss club, EHC Biel of the NL.

== Career statistics ==
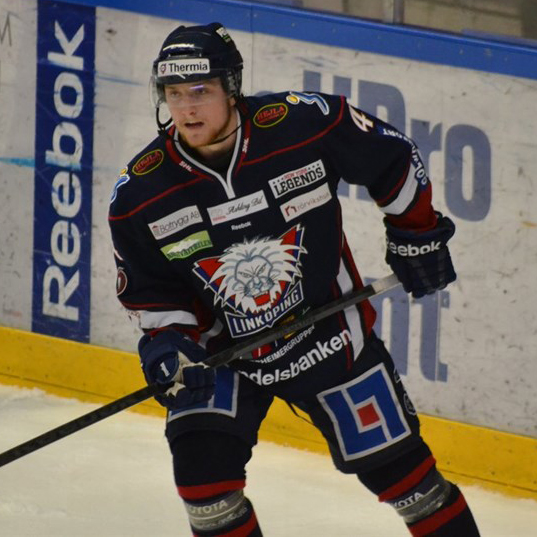
Hultström with Linköping HC

=== Regular season and playoffs ===
			Regular season					Playoffs
Season	Team	League	GP	G	A	Pts	PIM	GP	G	A	Pts	PIM
2007–08	Vimmerby HC	SWE.4	—	1	0	1	—	—	—	—	—	—
2008–09	Linköpings HC	J18	16	1	4	5	0	—	—	—	—	—
2008–09	Linköpings HC	J18 Allsv	14	2	2	4	4	2	0	0	0	0
2009–10	Linköpings HC	J18	22	4	14	18	18	—	—	—	—	—
2009–10	Linköpings HC	J18 Allsv	8	4	3	7	2	3	0	3	3	0
2009–10	Linköpings HC	J20	13	1	2	3	4	6	1	3	4	2
2009–10	Linköpings HC	SEL	1	0	0	0	0	—	—	—	—	—
2010–11	Linköpings HC	J20	41	11	10	21	55	3	1	2	3	2
2011–12	Linköpings HC	J20	2	0	1	1	2	6	2	4	6	4
2011–12	Linköpings HC	SEL	5	0	0	0	4	—	—	—	—	—
2011–12	IK Oskarshamn	Allsv	47	5	12	17	26	6	0	1	1	0
2012–13	Linköpings HC	SEL	55	5	3	8	32	10	0	2	2	2
2013–14	Linköpings HC	J20	3	2	2	4	14	—	—	—	—	—
2013–14	Linköpings HC	SHL	31	1	1	2	8	11	0	3	3	4
2013–14	IK Oskarshamn	Allsv	23	2	9	11	6	—	—	—	—	—
2014–15	Linköpings HC	SHL	5	0	0	0	0	—	—	—	—	—
2014–15	Leksands IF	SHL	48	10	23	33	20	—	—	—	—	—
2015–16	Djurgårdens IF	SHL	52	12	19	31	16	8	3	9	12	6
2016–17	Djurgårdens IF	SHL	44	7	13	20	24	3	0	1	1	2
2017–18	Djurgårdens IF	SHL	44	5	19	24	16	11	5	1	6	4
2018–19	Djurgårdens IF	SHL	52	9	18	27	4	19	5	8	13	10
2019–20	Djurgårdens IF	SHL	52	15	17	32	20	—	—	—	—	—
2020–21	HC Vityaz	KHL	57	7	16	23	28	—	—	—	—	—
2021–22	Metallurg Magnitogorsk	KHL	48	4	24	28	22	20	2	5	7	12
2022–23	Linköping HC	SHL	52	9	20	29	22	—	—	—	—	—
2023–24	Linköping HC	SHL	50	8	17	25	16	4	1	2	3	0
2024–25	Linköping HC	SHL	52	11	31	42	20	—	—	—	—	—
SHL totals			543	92	181	273	202	66	14	26	40	28
KHL totals			105	11	40	51	50	20	2	5	7	12

=== International ===
Year	Team	Event	Result	GP	G	A	Pts	PIM
2022	Sweden	OG	4th	2	0	0	0	0
Senior totals				2	0	0	0	0
