= Mantas Armalis =

Lithuanian ice hockey goaltender (born 1992)

- Born: 6 September 1992 (age 33) Plungė, Lithuania
- Height: 6 ft 4 in (193 cm)
- Weight: 194 lb (88 kg; 13 st 12 lb)
- Position: Goaltender
- Catches: Left
- Liiga team Former teams: Ilves; Djurgårdens IF; Dinamo Riga; Skellefteå AIK; Leksands IF
- National team: Lithuania
- NHL draft: Undrafted
- Playing career: 2007–present

Mantas Armalis (born 6 September 1992) is a Lithuanian professional ice hockey player who is a goaltender for Ilves of the Liiga. He previously played in various Swedish ice hockey leagues, American Hockey League (AHL) and Kontinental Hockey League (KHL).

== Playing career ==
Armalis began his career with the Djurgårdens IF's under-16 squad during the 2007–08 season, but moved to the Mora IK organization where he played for their junior J18 and J20 teams from 2007 to 2011. He started the 2011–12 season continuing to play for Mora IK, and was temporarily loaned to Söderhamn/Ljusne, a Division 1 C club. He made his debut in Division 1 on 5 October 2011 against Lindlövens IF. Söderhamn/Ljusne lost 5–3, while Armalis made 30 saves on 35 shots playing 60 minutes. On 30 November 2011, he played one more game while on loan to Division 1C team Borlänge HF against Hudiksvalls HC. His team lost 6–5 in overtime as Armalis again made 30 saves on 35 shots. He started 2012–13 season on loan to Tranås AIF and after 18 games of the regular season he had a 6–5–1 record with the second best save percentage in the league among all goalkeepers (93.31%) with 2.09 GAA. His team's results steadily improved after starting season with four losses and they were fighting for a playoff spot, while Mantas went away to help the Lithuanian national team in Olympic qualifiers.

On 11 April 2016, it was announced that Armalis signed an entry-level contract with the San Jose Sharks. Prior to signing with the Sharks, the Toronto Maple Leafs were considered favourites to land Armalis. Armalis made his debut for the Sharks in a preseason game against the Vancouver Canucks where he saved six shots out of seven, while the Sharks won. On 3 October 2016, Armalis was assigned to the Sharks' American Hockey League (AHL) affiliate San Jose Barracuda. After the 2016–17 season, the Sharks decided not to issue a qualifying offer to Armalis and he would become an unrestricted free agent on 1 July 2017.

On 3 October 2017, Armalis signed with Dinamo Riga of the Kontinental Hockey League (KHL). As Dinamo's backup for the 2017–18 season, Armalis collected three wins in 12 appearances.

On 7 May 2018, Armalis returned to SHL and signed a two-year contract with Skellefteå AIK.

On 24 March 2020, Armalis returned to Djurgårdens IF of the SHL and signed a two-year contract. On 13 April 2022, he signed a three-year contract with Leksands IF of the SHL. On 20 March 2025, it was announced that Armalis would not return to Leksands IF.

On 20 October 2025, Armalis signed a one-year contract with Ilves of the Liiga. On 31 December, he was signed to a one-year contract extension.

== International play ==
Armalis has played for Lithuania at various levels since 2008, and first played for Lithuania senior team in the 2010 World Championship Division I. He was named best goaltender of the tournament at the 2012 World Junior Ice Hockey Championships Division II A tournament

== Modeling ==
Armalis participated in several Versace runway shows during Milan Fashion Week. He worked with several agencies: Stockholmsgruppen, L.A Models, NYMM.

Armalis also modeled for Versace for their spring/summer collection in 2012 as well as the fall/winter collection in 2013. Making him an established face of the Versace label, Donatella Versace commented "Versace needs faces and bodies like Mantas, the strong gladiator-like build and muscular thighs,"

== Personal life ==
Armalis's parents moved to Sweden when he was four months old. Both his parents were professional orienteers and moved due to popularity of the sport. He was encouraged to join the same sport as his parents, but picked up ice hockey instead.

== Career statistics ==
=== Regular season and playoffs ===
| | | | Regular season | | | | | | | | | Playoffs |
| Season | Team | League | GP | W | L | T/OT | MIN | GA | SO | GAA | SV% | GP | W | L | MIN | GA | SO | GAA | SV% |
|---|---|---|---|---|---|---|---|---|---|---|---|---|---|---|---|---|---|---|---|
| 2009–10 | Mora IK | J20 | 21 | — | — | — | — | — | — | 3.99 | .878 | — | — | — | — | — | — | — | — |
| 2010–11 | Mora IK | J20 | 19 | — | — | — | — | — | — | 3.45 | .897 | — | — | — | — | — | — | — | — |
| 2011–12 | Mora IK | J20 | 14 | 3 | 10 | 1 | 838 | 55 | 0 | 3.94 | .854 | — | — | — | — | — | — | — | — |
| 2011–12 | Söderhamn/Ljusne | Div.1 | 1 | 0 | 1 | 0 | 60 | 5 | 0 | 5.00 | .857 | — | — | — | — | — | — | — | — |
| 2011–12 | Borlänge HF | Div.1 | 1 | 0 | 0 | 1 | 61 | 5 | 0 | 5.00 | .857 | — | — | — | — | — | — | — | — |
| 2012–13 | Tranås AIF | Div.1 | 33 | — | — | — | 1,967 | — | 3 | 2.62 | .915 | 5 | — | — | — | — | — | 3.80 | .901 |
| 2013–14 | Mora IK | Allsv | 40 | — | — | — | — | — | — | 2.20 | .926 | 5 | — | — | — | — | — | 4.33 | .857 |
| 2014–15 | Djurgårdens IF | SHL | 20 | 7 | 10 | 0 | 1,050 | 54 | 2 | 3.09 | .905 | — | — | — | — | — | — | — | — |
| 2015–16 | Djurgårdens IF | SHL | 34 | 16 | 16 | 0 | 1,986 | 80 | 2 | 2.42 | .918 | 3 | 0 | 3 | 178 | 11 | 0 | 3.71 | .895 |
| 2016–17 | San Jose Barracuda | AHL | 24 | 12 | 5 | 3 | 1,256 | 64 | 2 | 3.06 | .885 | — | — | — | — | — | — | — | — |
| 2017–18 | Dinamo Riga | KHL | 12 | 3 | 5 | 1 | 577 | 24 | 0 | 2.50 | .911 | — | — | — | — | — | — | — | — |
| 2018–19 | Skellefteå AIK | SHL | 32 | 18 | 14 | 0 | 1,901 | 69 | 4 | 2.18 | .916 | 6 | 2 | 2 | 254 | 11 | 1 | 2.60 | .904 |
| 2019–20 | Skellefteå AIK | J20 | 1 | — | — | — | — | — | — | 1.01 | .972 | — | — | — | — | — | — | — | — |
| 2019–20 | Skellefteå AIK | SHL | 38 | 5 | 8 | 1 | 769 | 38 | 1 | 2.96 | .880 | — | — | — | — | — | — | — | — |
| 2020–21 | Djurgårdens IF | SHL | 31 | 16 | 13 | 0 | 1,792 | 76 | 1 | 2.55 | .909 | 3 | 1 | 2 | 178 | 6 | 0 | 2.02 | .934 |
| 2021–22 | Djurgårdens IF | SHL | 36 | 13 | 22 | 0 | 2,049 | 110 | 1 | 3.22 | .900 | — | — | — | — | — | — | — | — |
| 2022–23 | Leksands IF | SHL | 41 | 24 | 16 | 0 | 2,328 | 86 | 4 | 2.22 | .920 | 3 | 1 | 2 | 190 | 7 | 0 | 2.21 | .883 |
| 2023–24 | Leksands IF | SHL | 25 | 11 | 13 | 0 | 1,464 | 62 | 2 | 2.54 | .899 | 2 | 0 | 2 | 115 | 5 | 0 | 2.59 | .857 |
| 2024–25 | Leksands IF | SHL | 16 | 5 | 11 | 0 | 933 | 47 | 1 | 3.02 | .880 | — | — | — | — | — | — | — | — |
| 2025–26 | Ilves | Liiga | 22 | 12 | 6 | 4 | 1,272 | 42 | 3 | 1.98 | .910 | 7 | 3 | 3 | 375 | 21 | 0 | 3.35 | .856 |
| AHL totals | | | 24 | 12 | 5 | 3 | 1,256 | 64 | 2 | 3.06 | .885 | — | — | — | — | — | — | — | — |
