= Olle Alsing =

Swedish professional ice hockey player

- Born: May 1, 1996 (age 30) Uppsala, Sweden
- Height: 5 ft 11 in (180 cm)
- Weight: 170 lb (77 kg; 12 st 2 lb)
- Position: Defence
- Shoots: Left
- SHL team Former teams: HV71; Leksands IF; Djurgårdens IF; Ottawa Senators; Barys Nur-Sultan
- NHL draft: Undrafted
- Playing career: 2014–present

Olle Alsing (born May 1, 1996) is a Swedish professional ice hockey defenceman for HV71 of the Swedish Hockey League (SHL). Alsing has previously played for the Ottawa Senators in the National Hockey League and Djurgårdens IF and Leksands IF of the Swedish Hockey League.

== Playing career ==
Alsing played as a youth within Almtuna IS before making his Swedish Hockey League (SHL) debut with Leksands IF during the 2016–17 season. Unable to prevent Leksand's relegation to the HockeyAllsvenskan, Alsing later agreed to return to the SHL in the 2018–19 season, after securing a contract with Djurgårdens IF on 2 May 2018. In his first season with Djurgården, Alsing led the SHL in plus/minus rating (+26) while ranking second among club defencemen in scoring with 15 points in 49 regular season games. He added 4 goals and 4 assists over 18 playoff games, helping his team to the SHL Finals, where Djurgården fell to Frölunda HC in 6 games.

On 10 May 2019, having gained NHL interest, the Ottawa Senators signed Alsing to a two-year entry-level contract. He was returned on loan by the Senators to continue his development in the SHL with Djurgårdens IF for the 2019–20 season. In the following 2020–21 season, with the North American season delayed due to the ongoing pandemic, Alsing signed a short-term contract with Austrian club, Graz99ers of the ICE Hockey League. He returned upon commencement of the Senators season, making his eventual NHL debut against the Montreal Canadiens on 5 May 2021, playing alongside fellow rookie Jacob Bernard-Docker. He played in four games for Ottawa and eleven games for Ottawa's American Hockey League affiliate, the Belleville Senators.

As an impending restricted free agent, Alsing opted to leave the Senators by signing a one-year contract with Kazakh-based club, Barys Nur-Sultan of the Kontinental Hockey League (KHL), on 28 May 2021. He played in 48 games in the KHL with Barys, scoring 2 goals and 11 points.

Following a lone season in the KHL, Alsing returned to his original Swedish club in the off-season, agreeing to a two-year contract with Leksands IF, on 12 May 2022.

After his contract with Leksands IF, Alsing continued his career in the SHL, signing a three-year contract with HV71 on 11 April 2024.

== Career statistics ==
			Regular season					Playoffs
Season	Team	League	GP	G	A	Pts	PIM	GP	G	A	Pts	PIM
2013–14	Almtuna IS	J20	9	0	2	2	0	4	0	2	2	0
2013–14	Almtuna IS	Allsv	3	0	1	1	2	—	—	—	—	—
2014–15	Almtuna IS	J20	3	0	1	1	6	1	0	0	0	2
2014–15	Almtuna IS	Allsv	47	2	9	11	8	—	—	—	—	—
2015–16	Almtuna IS	Allsv	51	7	15	22	10	5	0	1	1	2
2016–17	Leksands IF	SHL	45	1	7	8	10	—	—	—	—	—
2017–18	Leksands IF	Allsv	51	7	14	21	12	11	0	1	1	2
2018–19	Djurgårdens IF	SHL	49	4	11	15	10	18	4	4	8	2
2019–20	Djurgårdens IF	SHL	36	4	16	20	20	—	—	—	—	—
2020–21	Graz99ers	ICEHL	13	0	5	5	2	—	—	—	—	—
2020–21	Belleville Senators	AHL	11	0	2	2	0	—	—	—	—	—
2020–21	Ottawa Senators	NHL	4	0	0	0	0	—	—	—	—	—
2021–22	Barys Nur-Sultan	KHL	43	2	8	10	14	5	0	1	1	0
2022–23	Leksands IF	SHL	51	7	8	15	14	3	0	0	0	0
2023–24	Leksands IF	SHL	52	5	17	22	6	7	1	3	4	0
2024–25	HV71	SHL	51	6	20	26	10	—	—	—	—	—
SHL totals			284	27	79	106	70	28	5	7	12	2
NHL totals			4	0	0	0	0	—	—	—	—	—
KHL totals			43	2	8	10	14	5	0	1	1	0

== Awards and honours ==
Award	Year
SHL
Best P Plus–minus (+26)	2019
