= Michael Lindqvist =

Swedish ice hockey player

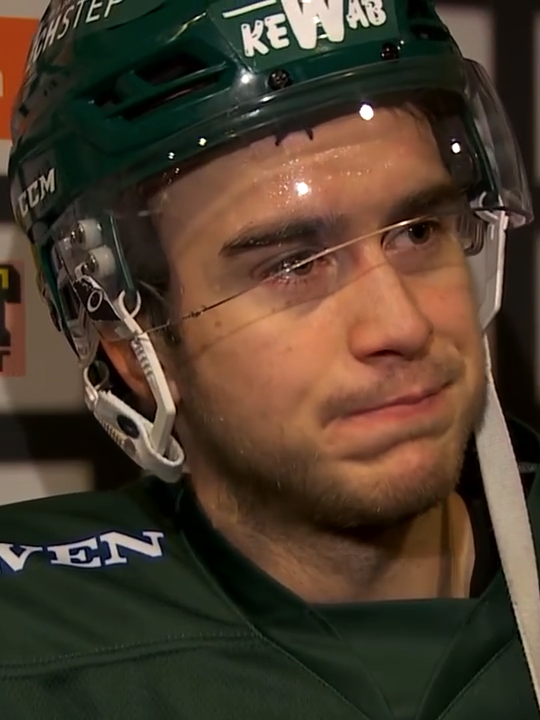
- Lindqvist with Färjestad BK in 2019
- Born: 12 September 1994 (age 32) Danderyd, Sweden
- Height: 5 ft 11 in (180 cm)
- Weight: 172 lb (78 kg; 12 st 4 lb)
- Position: Right wing
- Shoots: Right
- Liiga team Former teams: Tappara Tampere; AIK; Färjestad BK; Leksands IF
- NHL draft: Undrafted
- Playing career: 2013–present

Michael Lindqvist (born 12 December 1994) is a Swedish professional ice hockey forward for Tappara Tampere of the Finnish Liiga.

== Playing career ==
Lindqvist made his Elitserien debut playing with AIK during the 2012–13 Elitserien season.

Having played seven seasons within the AIK organization and with the club continuing in the Allsvenskan, Lindqvist left the club and signed a contract to return to the SHL with Färjestad BK on 31 March 2017. In the following 2017–18 season, Lindqvist led the club in points per game and established new career highs with 20 goals and 34 points in just 33 games.

On 2 May 2018, as an undrafted free agent, Lindqvist agreed to terms on a one-year contract with the New York Rangers of the National Hockey League (NHL). On 13 November, the Rangers placed Lindqvist on waivers with the intention of buying out his contract. On 14 November, he returned to Sweden and signed a contract until the end of the 2018–19 season with his former team, Färjestad BK of the SHL.

On 2 June 2025, Lindqvist joined his third SHL outfit, signing a two-year contract as a free agent with Leksands IF.

== Career statistics ==
			Regular season					Playoffs
Season	Team	League	GP	G	A	Pts	PIM	GP	G	A	Pts	PIM
2012–13	AIK	J20	25	16	10	26	18	3	0	0	0	6
2012–13	AIK	SEL	3	0	0	0	0	—	—	—	—	—
2013–14	AIK	J20	15	7	10	17	70	—	—	—	—	—
2013–14	AIK	SHL	45	3	7	10	12	—	—	—	—	—
2014–15	AIK	J20	1	1	0	1	0	—	—	—	—	—
2014–15	AIK	Allsv	43	5	11	16	32	—	—	—	—	—
2015–16	AIK	Allsv	49	10	15	25	26	10	2	4	6	2
2016–17	AIK	Allsv	51	17	22	39	24	7	5	4	9	0
2017–18	Färjestad BK	SHL	33	20	14	34	22	2	2	1	3	0
2018–19	Hartford Wolf Pack	AHL	16	3	4	7	8	—	—	—	—	—
2018–19	Färjestad BK	SHL	33	16	16	32	10	14	5	8	13	28
2019–20	Färjestad BK	SHL	26	13	12	25	8	—	—	—	—	—
2020–21	Färjestad BK	SHL	51	17	16	33	53	6	1	5	6	4
2021–22	Färjestad BK	SHL	26	9	7	16	10	19	3	7	10	6
2022–23	Färjestad BK	SHL	50	14	13	27	24	6	1	0	1	2
2023–24	Färjestad BK	SHL	50	13	17	30	20	2	0	0	0	0
2024–25	Färjestad BK	SHL	45	8	14	22	14	6	2	1	3	2
SHL totals			362	113	116	229	173	55	14	22	36	42

== Awards and honours ==
Award	Year
SHL
Le Mat Trophy (Färjestad BK)	2022
