= Ryan Lasch =

American ice hockey player (born 1987)

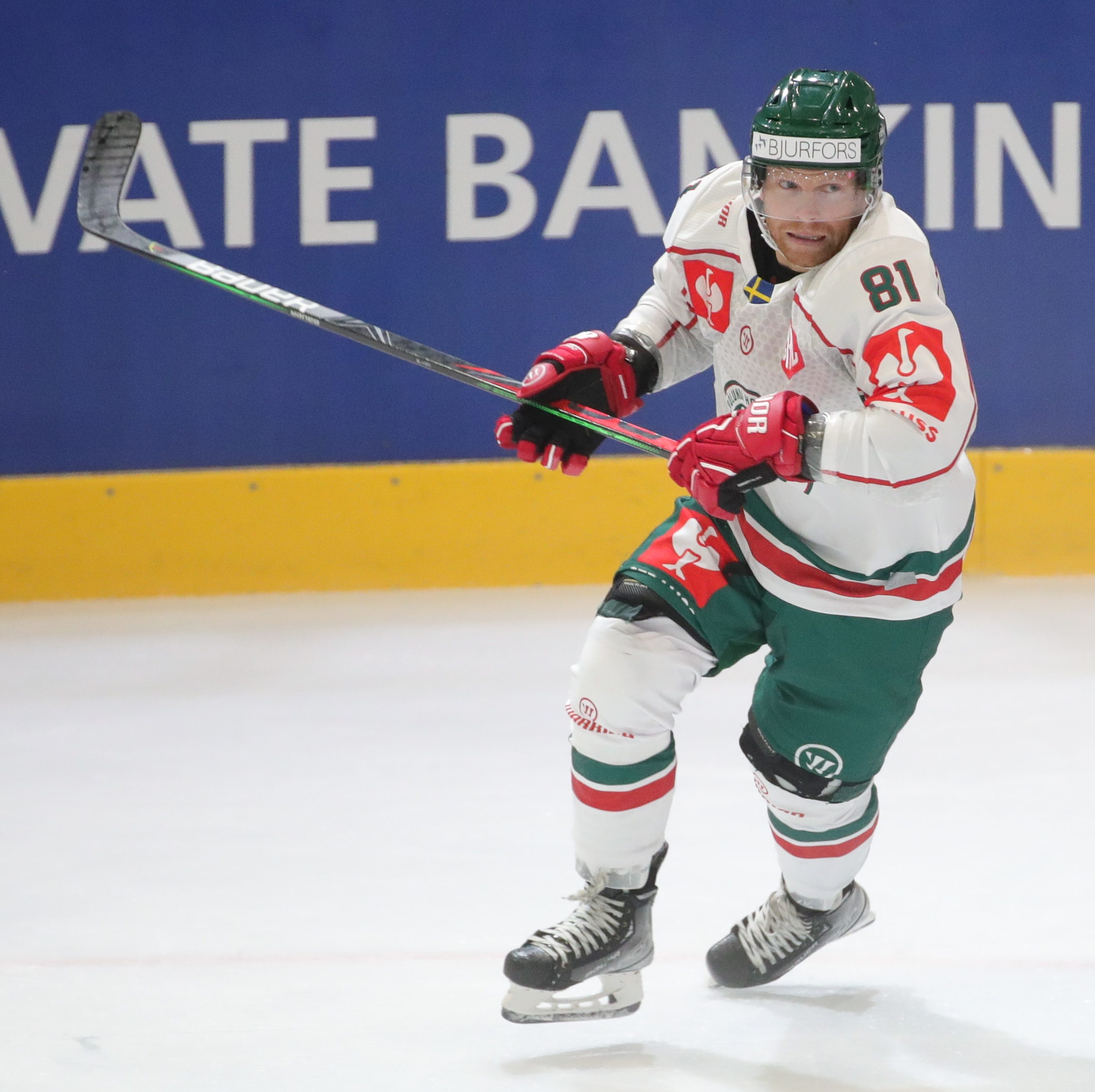
- Born: January 22, 1987 (age 39) Lake Forest, California, U.S.
- Height: 5 ft 8 in (173 cm)
- Weight: 174 lb (79 kg; 12 st 6 lb)
- Position: Right wing
- Shoots: Right
- EHL team Former teams: Vålerenga Ishockey; Södertälje SK; Lahti Pelicans; Växjö Lakers; TPS; Frölunda HC; SC Bern; ZSC Lions
- National team: United States
- NHL draft: Undrafted
- Playing career: 2010–present

Ryan Alan Lasch (born January 22, 1987) is an American professional ice hockey player who is a right winger for Vålerenga Ishockey of the EliteHockey Ligaen (EHL).

== Playing career ==
After playing four years with St. Cloud State University, Lasch completed his collegiate career as the university's all-time leading scorer. An undrafted free agent, Lasch began his professional career in Europe, signing a one-year contract with Södertälje SK of the Swedish Elitserien. During the following 2011–12 season he led the Finnish SM-Liiga with 62 points to capture the scoring title whilst helping the Lahti Pelicans to finish second, their highest in franchise history.

Despite re-signing to a one-year contract extension with the Pelicans, on May 31, 2012, Lasch was signed by the Anaheim Ducks to a two-year contract prior to the 2012–13 season. In signing he became the franchise's first Orange County–born player to sign with the Ducks. Due to the lockout he was directly assigned to the Ducks AHL affiliate, the Norfolk Admirals.

Unable to duplicate his European success with the Admirals, and also enduring a stint with ECHL club Fort Wayne Komets, Lasch opted to return to the Swedish Elitserien, signing on loan from the Ducks to the Växjö Lakers for the remainder of the season on January 26, 2013. After playing in the Lakers' last 10 games to end their season, the Ducks traded Lasch along with a seventh-round pick in 2014 to the Toronto Maple Leafs in exchange for Dave Steckel on March 15, 2013. He was then immediately recalled to report to AHL affiliate, the Toronto Marlies.

Lasch then spent the 2013–14 season entirely with the Växjö Lakers, tallying 20 goals and 16 assists in 54 SHL games. The 2014–15 season saw him move to Finland. He made 43 Liiga appearances for HC TPS, before returning to Sweden. He finished the season with Frölunda HC, scoring six goals in 12 contests to go along with eight assists.

Lasch re-signed with Frölunda for the 2015–16 campaign and won the Swedish national championship as well as the Champions Hockey League (CHL) with the team. He led the SHL in assists (51 in regular season) and also scored 15 goals. In 16 playoff contests, Lasch tallied eight goals and eleven assists. In CHL play, Lasch scored seven goals and dished out nine assists in 13 games and was named Champions Hockey League Most Valuable Player.

On September 8, 2016, Lasch was signed to a one-year contract by SC Bern as a replacement for Kris Versteeg. He saw the ice in 52 contests with 17 goals and 34 assists en route to winning the 2017 Swiss championship. On April 21, he signed a three-year deal with Frölunda HC, returning for a second stint with the SHL outfit.

He returned to Lahti Pelicans for the 2020–21 season.

On January 23, 2021, Lasch joined the ZSC Lions as a replacement for injured Chris Baltisberger for the remainder of the 2020–21 season.

On May 19, 2021, Lasch returned to Frölunda.

On June 2, 2023, Lasch signed a two-year contract with his former team, Lahti Pelicans of the Finnish Liiga.

On July 29, 2025, he signed a one-year contract with Vålerenga Ishockey of the EliteHockey Ligaen (EHL).

== Playing style ==
Matias Strozyk, a journalist for Yleisradio, described Ryan Lasch's playing style for Elite Prospects in 2011:

A fairly small winger and hard worker. A quick skater with sharp movement. Has a very good shot and does well in playmaking. Useful as an offensive player, especially as a finisher. Sometimes criticized of embellishment when drawing penalties.

== Career statistics ==
=== Regular season and playoffs ===
			Regular season					Playoffs
Season	Team	League	GP	G	A	Pts	PIM	GP	G	A	Pts	PIM
2003–04	Pembroke Lumber Kings	CJHL	53	13	17	30	42	—	—	—	—	—
2004–05	Pembroke Lumber Kings	CJHL	49	25	39	64	24	—	—	—	—	—
2005–06	Pembroke Lumber Kings	CJHL	56	70	77	147	61	—	—	—	—	—
2006–07	St. Cloud State University	WCHA	40	16	23	39	8	—	—	—	—	—
2007–08	St. Cloud State University	WCHA	40	25	28	53	12	—	—	—	—	—
2008–09	St. Cloud State University	WCHA	38	18	24	42	52	—	—	—	—	—
2009–10	St. Cloud State University	WCHA	43	20	29	49	26	—	—	—	—	—
2010–11	Södertälje SK	SEL	55	12	18	30	40	—	—	—	—	—
2011–12	Pelicans	SM-l	59	24	38	62	26	17	5	11	16	29
2012–13	Norfolk Admirals	AHL	19	2	3	5	6	—	—	—	—	—
2012–13	Fort Wayne Komets	ECHL	12	6	9	15	2	—	—	—	—	—
2012–13	Växjö Lakers	SEL	10	0	5	5	4	—	—	—	—	—
2012–13	Toronto Marlies	AHL	11	4	1	5	4	2	1	0	1	0
2013–14	Växjö Lakers	SHL	54	20	16	36	14	12	1	5	6	0
2014–15	TPS	Liiga	43	12	24	36	22	—	—	—	—	—
2014–15	Frölunda HC	SHL	12	6	8	14	2	9	2	1	3	4
2015–16	Frölunda HC	SHL	51	15	36	51	20	16	8	11	19	2
2016–17	SC Bern	NLA	46	13	25	38	12	16	4	9	13	2
2017–18	Frölunda HC	SHL	49	15	40	55	18	5	0	3	3	2
2018–19	Frölunda HC	SHL	46	12	38	50	18	16	6	13	19	4
2019–20	Frölunda HC	SHL	48	12	36	48	38	—	—	—	—	—
2020–21	Pelicans	Liiga	26	10	27	36	0	—	—	—	—	—
2020–21	ZSC Lions	NL	23	7	10	17	2	9	4	1	5	0
2021–22	Frölunda HC	SHL	52	13	53	66	8	9	0	8	8	0
2022–23	Frölunda HC	SHL	41	5	19	24	28	13	2	6	8	2
2023–24	Pelicans	Liiga	55	9	45	54	14	17	3	11	14	0
2024–25	Pelicans	Liiga	54	13	39	52	12	10	1	11	12	4
2025–26	Vålerenga Ishockey	EHL	39	14	30	49	12	7	0	2	2	0
SHL totals			418	110	269	379	190	90	23	52	75	20

=== International ===
Year	Team	Event	Result	GP	G	A	Pts	PIM
2012	United States	WC	7th	7	0	2	2	0
Senior totals				7	0	2	2	0

== Awards and honors ==
Award	Year	Ref
CJHL
MVP	2006	
College
All-WCHA Rookie Team	2007	
All-WCHA First Team	2008, 2009	
AHCA West Second-Team All-American	2008	
All-WCHA Second Team	2010	
WCHA All-Academic Team	2010	
Liiga
All-Star Team	2012	
Veli-Pekka Ketola trophy	2012	
SHL
Le Mat trophy champion	2016, 2019	
Forward of the Year	2019	
Stefan Liv Memorial Trophy	2019	
NLA
Champion	2017	
CHL
Champion	2016, 2019	
MVP	2016	
