= 2019–20 SHL season =

- League: Swedish Hockey League
- Sport: Ice hockey
- Duration: Scheduled for: September 2019 – March 2020; (Regular season); March – May 2020; (Playoffs)

Regular season
- First place: Luleå HF
- Top scorer: Marcus Nilsson (Färjestad BK)

Playoffs

SHL seasons
- ← 2018–19 2020–21 →

The 2019–20 SHL season was the 45th season of the Swedish Hockey League (SHL). The regular season began in September 2019 and ended in March 2020; it was scheduled to be followed by the Swedish Championship playoffs and the relegation playoffs. The league consisted of 14 teams; Leksands IF returned to the SHL after two seasons in HockeyAllsvenskan, having defeated Mora IK in the 2019 SHL qualifiers. IK Oskarshamn played in the SHL for the first time in franchise history, after defeating Timrå IK in the SHL qualifiers.

On 3 March, Luleå HF won the regular season title for the third time; after a 3–0 win over Rögle BK, coupled with defeats for Skellefteå AIK (0–1 versus Frölunda HC) and Färjestad BK (1–2 versus HV71), Luleå HF held an unassailable 14-point lead with 4 matches remaining.

After the playoffs were initially delayed following the conclusion of the regular season, due to the COVID-19 pandemic in Sweden, the season was curtailed on 15 March. No Swedish champions were determined, for the first time since 1952, and the SHL featured the same teams next season.

== Teams ==
SHL team map

Team	City	Arena	Capacity
Brynäs IF	Gävle	Monitor ERP Arena	7,909
Djurgårdens IF	Stockholm	Hovet	8,094
Frölunda HC	Gothenburg	Scandinavium	12,044
Färjestad BK	Karlstad	Löfbergs Arena	8,647
HV71	Jönköping	Kinnarps Arena	7,000
Leksands IF	Leksand	Tegera Arena	7,650
Linköping HC	Linköping	Saab Arena	8,500
Luleå HF	Luleå	Coop Norrbotten Arena	6,300
Malmö Redhawks	Malmö	Malmö Arena	13,000
IK Oskarshamn	Oskarshamn	Be-Ge Hockey Center	3,275
Rögle BK	Ängelholm	Catena Arena	5,150
Skellefteå AIK	Skellefteå	Skellefteå Kraft Arena	6,001
Växjö Lakers	Växjö	Vida Arena	5,700
Örebro HK	Örebro	Behrn Arena	5,150

== Regular season ==
Each team plays 52 games, playing each of the other thirteen teams four times: twice on home ice, and twice away from home. Points are awarded for each game, where three points are awarded for winning in regulation time, two points for winning in overtime or shootout, one point for losing in overtime or shootout, and zero points for losing in regulation time. At the end of the regular season, the team that finishes with the most points is crowned the league champion.

=== Standings ===
Pos	Team	Pld	W	OTW	OTL	L	GF	GA	GD	Pts	Qualification
1	Luleå HF	52	30	6	4	12	151	98	+53	106	Qualification to Quarter-finals
2	Färjestad BK	52	25	6	5	16	173	146	+27	92	Qualification to Quarter-finals
3	Rögle BK	52	25	7	3	17	149	123	+26	92	Qualification to Quarter-finals
4	Skellefteå AIK	52	27	4	1	20	149	122	+27	90	Qualification to Quarter-finals
5	HV71	52	24	6	5	17	158	130	+28	89	Qualification to Quarter-finals
6	Djurgårdens IF	52	24	5	6	17	137	135	+2	88	Qualification to Quarter-finals
7	Frölunda HC	52	25	4	2	21	154	126	+28	85	Qualification to Eighth-finals
8	Örebro HK	52	26	2	3	21	137	133	+4	85	Qualification to Eighth-finals
9	Malmö Redhawks	52	21	4	6	21	131	130	+1	77	Qualification to Eighth-finals
10	Växjö Lakers	52	20	4	2	26	127	143	−16	70	Qualification to Eighth-finals
11	Linköping HC	52	14	6	11	21	118	139	−21	65	
12	Brynäs IF	52	13	8	5	26	132	168	−36	60	
13	Leksands IF	52	13	2	6	31	115	168	−53	49	Qualification to Relegation playoffs
14	IK Oskarshamn	52	10	3	8	31	110	180	−70	44	Qualification to Relegation playoffs

Source: SHL.se
Rules for classification: 1) Points; 2) Goal difference; 3) Number of goals scored

=== Statistics ===
==== Scoring leaders ====
The following shows the top ten players who led the league in points, at the conclusion of the regular season. If two or more skaters are tied (i.e. same number of points, goals and played games), all of the tied skaters are shown.

Player	Team	GP	G	A	Pts	+/–	PIM
(Sweden) Marcus Nilsson	Färjestad BK	50	12	42	54	+9	60
(Canada) Kodie Curran	Rögle BK	48	12	37	49	+8	67
(United States) Ryan Lasch	Frölunda HC	48	12	36	48	−4	38
(Sweden) Anton Rödin	Brynäs IF	46	14	32	46	+4	73
(United States) Broc Little	Linköping HC	48	24	21	45	−4	14
(Sweden) Mathias Bromé	Örebro HK	52	17	26	43	+10	22
(Sweden) Per Åslund	Färjestad BK	52	16	25	41	+11	45
(Sweden) Johannes Kinnvall	HV71	51	11	29	40	+5	8
(Sweden) Joakim Lindström	Skellefteå AIK	47	16	23	39	+8	45
(Sweden) Fredrik Händemark	Malmö Redhawks	52	14	24	38	+9	65

==== Leading goaltenders ====
The following shows the top ten goaltenders who led the league in goals against average, provided that they have played at least 40% of their team's minutes, at the conclusion of the regular season.

Player	Team	GP	TOI	W	T	L	GA	SO	Sv%	GAA
(Sweden) Joel Lassinantti	Luleå HF	36	2151:57	27	2	7	57	6	92.81	1.59
(Sweden) Gustaf Lindvall	Skellefteå AIK	36	2121:27	24	3	7	63	6	93.52	1.78
(Sweden) Oscar Alsenfelt	Malmö Redhawks	37	2175:41	16	4	17	76	6	92.76	2.10
(Czech Republic) Roman Will	Rögle BK	34	1984:56	22	1	10	70	4	92.13	2.12
(Sweden) Jonas Gunnarsson	HV71	35	2094:31	18	3	14	75	5	91.53	2.15
(Sweden) Niklas Rubin	Frölunda HC	25	1410:12	12	0	10	51	2	91.36	2.17
(Czech Republic) Dominik Furch	Örebro HK	46	2653:40	24	1	20	100	4	91.77	2.26
(Sweden) Arvid Holm	Färjestad BK	31	1824:27	19	2	9	69	1	91.45	2.27
(Sweden) Niklas Svedberg	Djurgårdens IF	35	2029:23	20	2	13	77	5	91.83	2.28
(Sweden) Jonas Gustavsson	Linköping HC	33	1865:59	13	5	13	73	1	91.73	2.35

== Playoffs ==
Ten teams qualified for the playoffs: the top six teams in the regular season were scheduled to have a bye to the quarterfinals, while teams ranked seventh to tenth met each other (7 versus 10, 8 versus 9) in a preliminary playoff round. If the finals had occurred and led to a game seven, that game was intended to be played on 2 May 2020.

In the first round the 7th-ranked team were scheduled to meet the 10th-ranked team and the 8th-ranked team were scheduled to meet the 9th-ranked team for a place in the second round. In the second round, the top-ranked team were scheduled to meet the lowest-ranked winner of the first round, the 2nd-ranked team were scheduled to face the other winner of the first round, the 3rd-ranked team were scheduled to face the 6th-ranked team, and the 4th-ranked team were scheduled to meet the 5th-ranked team. In the third round, the highest remaining seed was scheduled to matched against the lowest remaining seed. In each round the higher-seeded team was scheduled to be awarded home advantage.

The playoffs were scheduled to be held as a best-of-three series in the eighth-finals, with the remainder of the playoffs as a best-of-seven series that followed an alternating home team format: the higher-seeded team playing at home for games 1 and 3 (plus 5 and 7 if necessary), and the lower-seeded team at home for game 2 and 4 (plus 6 if necessary). However, due to the COVID-19 pandemic in Sweden, the start of the playoffs was delayed from 14 March, to 24 March. As a result, the playoff format was altered; the eighth-finals were kept as a best-of-three series, but the remaining rounds were changed to a best-of-five series.

On 14 March, the Swedish Hockey League, citing agreement with its fourteen member teams, formally requested that the playoffs be cancelled to the Swedish Ice Hockey Association. Following a meeting the following day, the playoffs were cancelled.

== SHL awards ==
Guldhjälmen: Kodie Curran (Rögle BK)
Guldpucken: Not awarded due to the COVID-19 pandemic in Sweden
Honken Trophy: Not awarded due to the COVID-19 pandemic in Sweden
Håkan Loob Trophy: Broc Little (Linköping HC)
Rookie of the Year: Jesper Frödén, (Skellefteå AIK)
Salming Trophy: Kodie Curran, (Rögle BK)
Stefan Liv Memorial Trophy: Not awarded due to the COVID-19 pandemic in Sweden
Guldpipan: Patrik Sjöberg
