= Honken Trophy =

- Date: 2002
- Country: Sweden

Honken Trophy is awarded annually to the Swedish goaltender of the year, playing in Sweden (usually in the SHL), as decided on by Eventhouse and Kamratföreningen Hockeyjournalisterna. It was installed in 2002 and resembles the Vezina Trophy of the NHL. The trophy is named in honour of goalie Leif "Honken" Holmqvist.

== Winners ==
Season	Winner	Team	Win #
2001–02	(Sweden) Stefan Liv	HV71	1
2002–03	(Sweden) Henrik Lundqvist	Västra Frölunda HC	1
2003–04	(Sweden) Henrik Lundqvist	Västra Frölunda HC	2
2004–05	(Sweden) Henrik Lundqvist	Frölunda HC	3
2005–06	(Sweden) Johan Holmqvist	Brynäs IF	1
2006–07	(Sweden) Erik Ersberg	HV71	1
2007–08	(Sweden) Daniel Larsson	Djurgårdens IF	1
2008–09	(Sweden) Johan Holmqvist	Frölunda HC	2
2009–10	(Sweden) Jacob Markström	Brynäs IF	1
2010–11	(Sweden) Viktor Fasth	AIK	1
2011–12	(Sweden) Viktor Fasth	AIK	2
2012–13	(Sweden) Gustaf Wesslau	HV71	1
2013–14	(Sweden) Linus Ullmark	Modo Hockey	1
2014–15	(Sweden) Joel Lassinantti	Luleå HF	1
2015–16	(Sweden) Markus Svensson	Skellefteå AIK	1
2016–17	(Sweden) Oscar Alsenfelt	Malmö Redhawks	1
2017–18	(Sweden) Viktor Fasth	Växjö Lakers	3
2018–19	(Sweden) Adam Reideborn	Djurgårdens IF	1
2020–21	(Sweden) Viktor Fasth	Växjö Lakers	4
2021–22	(Sweden) Jhonas Enroth	Örebro HK	1
2022–23	(Sweden) Linus Söderström	Skellefteå AIK	1
2023–24	(Sweden) Lars Johansson	Frölunda HC	1
2024–25	(Sweden) Arvid Holm	Rögle BK	1
2025–26	(Sweden) Magnus Hellberg	Djurgårdens IF	1
