= Axel Jonsson-Fjällby =

Swedish ice hockey player (born 1998)

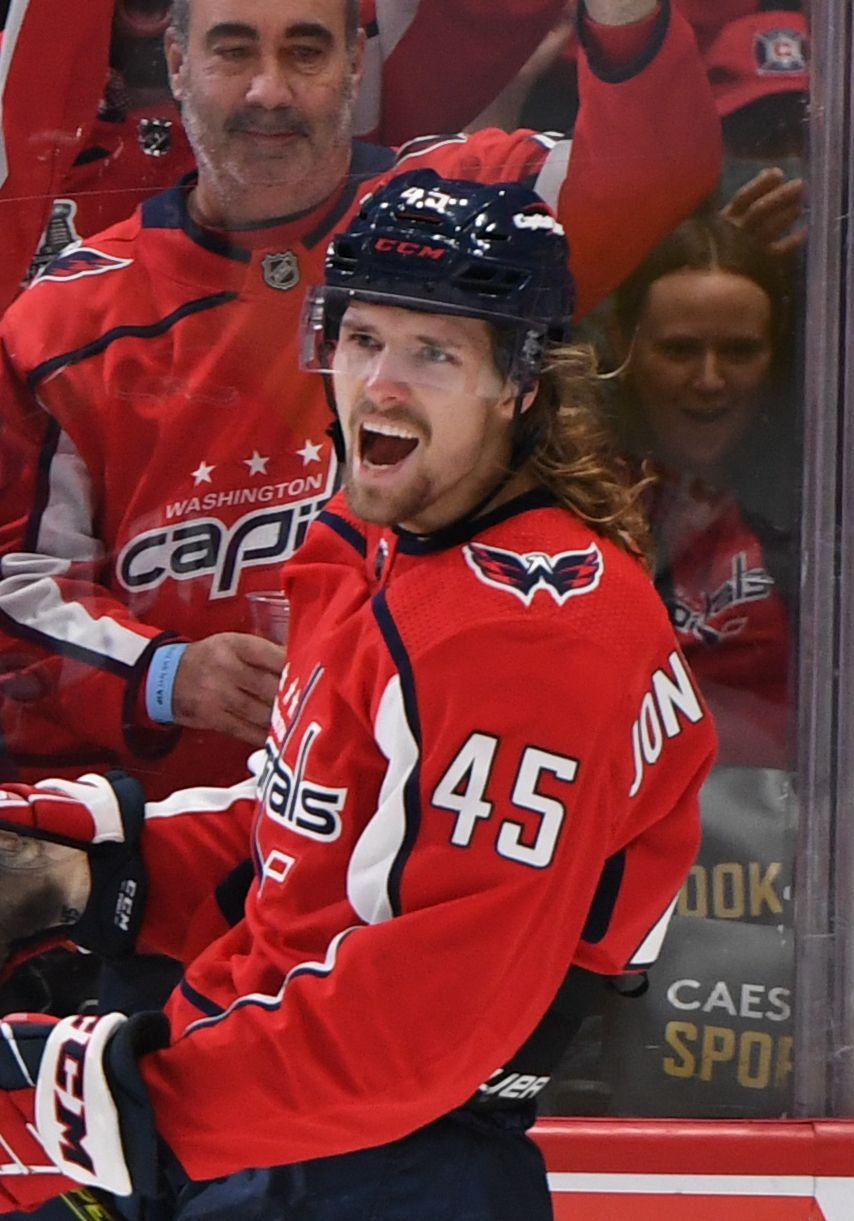
- Jonsson-Fjällby with the Washington Capitals in 2022.
- Born: February 10, 1998 (age 28) Stockholm, Sweden
- Height: 6 ft 0 in (183 cm)
- Weight: 185 lb (84 kg; 13 st 3 lb)
- Position: Left wing
- Shoots: Left
- SHL team Former teams: Brynäs IF; Djurgårdens IF; Washington Capitals; Winnipeg Jets
- NHL draft: 147th overall, 2016; Washington Capitals
- Playing career: 2016–present

Axel Jonsson-Fjällby (born 10 February 1998) is a Swedish professional ice hockey forward for Brynäs IF of the Swedish Hockey League (SHL). He was selected by the Washington Capitals in the fifth round, 147th overall, of the 2016 NHL entry draft.

== Playing career ==
Jonsson-Fjällby made his professional debut in his native Sweden with Djurgårdens IF of the Swedish Hockey League (SHL) in the 2016–17 season.

=== Washington Capitals ===
On May 2, 2018, Jonsson-Fjällby was signed to a three-year, entry-level contract with the Washington Capitals. He was loaned back to Djurgårdens IF on November 13, 2018, after a brief period where he played with the Hershey Bears of the American Hockey League.

==== Loan to Västervik and brief stint in Buffalo ====
On 14 September 2020, Jonsson-Fjällby signed a loan agreement with Västerviks IK in Hockeyallsvenskan. He made his debut on October 2, 2020, when they beat AIK at Hovet 4–2. The next day, he scored his first and second points for the club when he made two assists in a 4–3 win against Mora IK in Smidjegrav Arena.

The first goal in Västervik came on October 20, 2020, when the team once again met Mora IK away. He scored two goals and an assist in the match that the team lost 4–3 on penalties.

On January 8, 2021, Jonsson-Fjällby left Västervik to return to the Washington Capitals' organization. During his time at the club, he made 25 appearances, scoring 4 goals and 11 assists.

While attending the Capitals' 2021 training camp for the upcoming 2021–22 season, Jonsson-Fjällby was placed on waivers for reassignment before he was claimed by the Buffalo Sabres on October 4, 2021. Due to visa complications he would ultimately be re-claimed by the Capitals off waivers one week later on October 11, 2021, and reassigned to the Hershey Bears of the AHL.

=== Winnipeg Jets ===
Before the 2022–23 campaign, Jonsson-Fjällby, for the second consecutive season, was placed on waivers following the pre-season and was claimed by the Winnipeg Jets on 11 October 2022.

=== Brynäs IF ===
Following three seasons within the Jets organization, Jonsson-Fjällby left North America as a pending free agent and returned to Sweden in signing a three-year contract with Brynäs IF of the SHL on 23 May 2025.

== Career statistics ==
=== Regular season and playoffs ===
| | | | Regular season | | | | | Playoffs |
| Season | Team | League | GP | G | A | Pts | PIM | GP | G | A | Pts | PIM |
|---|---|---|---|---|---|---|---|---|---|---|---|---|
| 2015–16 | Djurgårdens IF | J20 | 39 | 13 | 16 | 29 | 8 | 7 | 4 | 4 | 8 | 4 |
| 2016–17 | Djurgårdens IF | J20 | 32 | 17 | 20 | 37 | 14 | 1 | 0 | 0 | 0 | 0 |
| 2016–17 | Djurgårdens IF | SHL | 24 | 0 | 1 | 1 | 0 | 2 | 0 | 1 | 1 | 0 |
| 2017–18 | Djurgårdens IF | SHL | 42 | 7 | 9 | 16 | 12 | 11 | 6 | 2 | 8 | 2 |
| 2018–19 | Hershey Bears | AHL | 16 | 2 | 1 | 3 | 0 | — | — | — | — | — |
| 2018–19 | Djurgårdens IF | SHL | 36 | 1 | 9 | 10 | 8 | 19 | 7 | 5 | 12 | 0 |
| 2019–20 | Hershey Bears | AHL | 61 | 12 | 11 | 23 | 10 | — | — | — | — | — |
| 2020–21 | Västerviks IK | Allsv | 26 | 4 | 11 | 15 | 4 | — | — | — | — | — |
| 2020–21 | Hershey Bears | AHL | 31 | 10 | 5 | 15 | 10 | — | — | — | — | — |
| 2021–22 | Hershey Bears | AHL | 44 | 16 | 18 | 34 | 8 | — | — | — | — | — |
| 2021–22 | Washington Capitals | NHL | 23 | 2 | 2 | 4 | 4 | — | — | — | — | — |
| 2022–23 | Winnipeg Jets | NHL | 50 | 6 | 8 | 14 | 8 | 1 | 0 | 0 | 0 | 0 |
| 2022–23 | Manitoba Moose | AHL | 4 | 3 | 1 | 4 | 2 | — | — | — | — | — |
| 2023–24 | Winnipeg Jets | NHL | 26 | 2 | 3 | 5 | 0 | 1 | 0 | 0 | 0 | 0 |
| 2023–24 | Manitoba Moose | AHL | 41 | 12 | 18 | 30 | 4 | 2 | 0 | 0 | 0 | 0 |
| 2024–25 | Manitoba Moose | AHL | 65 | 12 | 15 | 27 | 24 | — | — | — | — | — |
| SHL totals | | | 102 | 8 | 19 | 27 | 20 | 32 | 13 | 8 | 21 | 2 |
| NHL totals | | | 99 | 10 | 13 | 23 | 12 | 2 | 0 | 0 | 0 | 0 |

Medal record

Representing Sweden

Ice hockey

World Junior Championships
| Silver medal – second place | 2018 United States | |

World U18 Championships
| Silver medal – second place | 2016 United States | |

=== International ===
| Year | Team | Event | Result | GP | G | A | Pts | PIM |
|---|---|---|---|---|---|---|---|---|
| 2016 | Sweden | U18 | 2nd place, silver medalist(s) | 7 | 2 | 2 | 4 | 4 |
| 2018 | Sweden | WJC | 2nd place, silver medalist(s) | 7 | 2 | 2 | 4 | 2 |
| Junior totals | | | | 14 | 4 | 4 | 8 | 6 |
