= Johan Mattsson =

Swedish ice hockey player

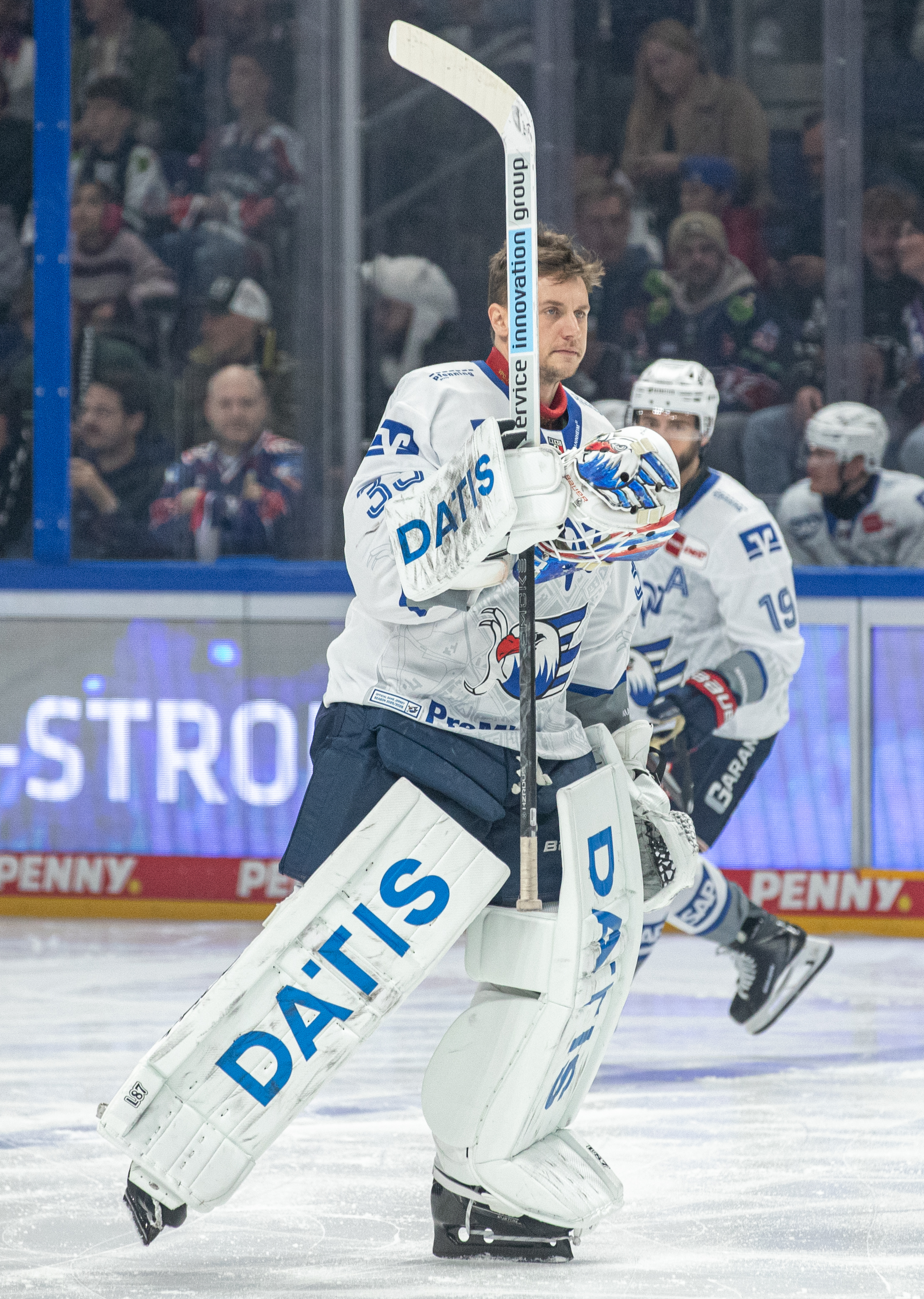
- Mattsson in 2025
- Born: 25 April 1992 (age 34) Huddinge, Sweden
- Height: 6 ft 4 in (193 cm)
- Weight: 196 lb (89 kg; 14 st 0 lb)
- Position: Goaltender
- Catches: Right
- DEL team Former teams: Adler Mannheim; Frölunda HC; Dinamo Riga; Avtomobilist Yekaterinburg; SKA Saint Petersburg; Barys Astana
- NHL draft: 211th overall, 2011; Chicago Blackhawks
- Playing career: 2009–present

Medal record

Representing Sweden

Ice hockey

World Junior Championships
Gold medal – first place	2012 Calgary	

Johan Mattsson (born 25 April 1992) is a Swedish professional ice hockey goaltender. He is currently playing for Adler Mannheim of the Deutsche Eishockey Liga (DEL).

== Playing career ==
Mattsson played for Södertälje SK in the Elitserien during the 2008–09 Elitserien postseason.

Mattsson was the last player selected in the 2011 NHL entry draft, taken with the 211th overall pick, the last in the draft, by the Chicago Blackhawks in the 7th round. Mattsson was later drafted by the Sudbury Wolves of the Ontario Hockey League with the 19th pick in the Canadian Hockey League Import Draft. After attending training camp with the Blackhawks, Mattsson returned to the Wolves to start the 2011–12 OHL season.

In 2013, un-signed from the Blackhawks he returned home to play in the Swedish HockeyAllsvenskan (the division under the SHL) with Djurgårdens IF as the new head goalkeeper, replacing Chet Pickard who went back to NHL.

After four seasons in the Allsvenskan, Mattsson returned to the top tier, agreeing to a two-year contract with Frölunda HC on April 20, 2017.

Mattsson remained with Frölunda HC for four seasons, before leaving as a free agent following the 2020–21 season. On 15 April 2021, Mattsson signed his first contract abroad, agreeing to a contract with Latvian based KHL club, Dinamo Riga.

After a lone season serving as backup with SKA Saint Petersburg, Mattsson left the club as a free agent and was signed to continue in the KHL with Kazakh-based Barys Astana on 12 July 2024.

Having completed his fifth season in the KHL, Mattsson left Barys Astana as a free agent and was signed to a one-year contract with German club, Adler Mannheim of the DEL, on 8 July 2025.

== Awards and honours ==
Award	Year
Allsvenskan
Best GAA (2.04)	2016
CHL
Champions (Frölunda HC)	2019
SHL
Le Mat Trophy (Frölunda HC)	2019
