= Adam Reideborn =

Swedish ice hockey goaltender

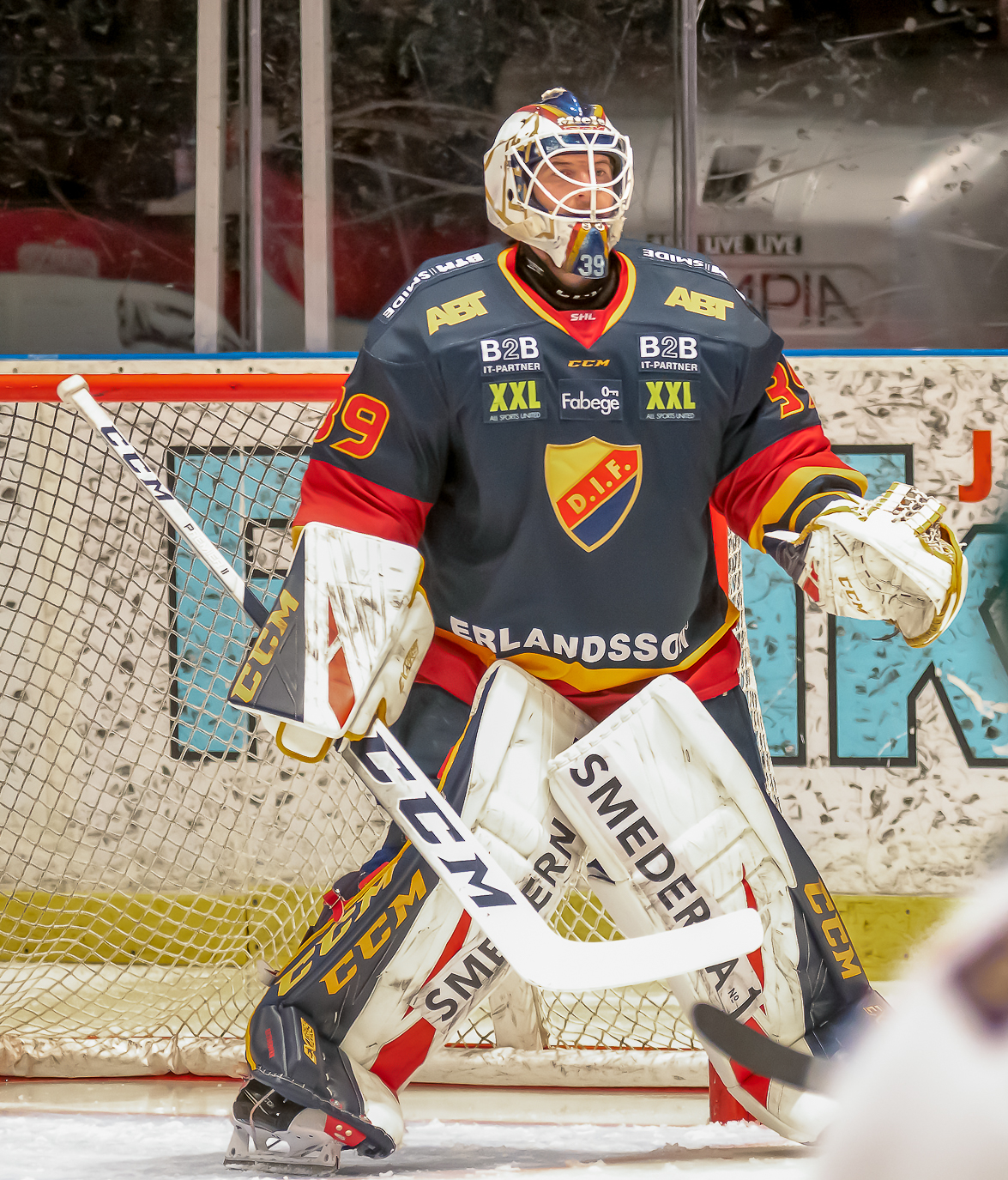
- Reideborn playing for Djurgårdens IF in January 2019.
- Born: 18 January 1992 (age 34) Stockholm, Sweden
- Height: 6 ft 0 in (183 cm)
- Weight: 179 lb (81 kg; 12 st 11 lb)
- Position: Goaltender
- Catches: Left
- NL team Former teams: SC Bern; Djurgårdens IF; Modo Hockey; Ak Bars Kazan; CSKA Moscow
- National team: Sweden
- Playing career: 2010–present

Adam Reideborn (born 18 January 1992) is a Swedish professional ice hockey goaltender for SC Bern in the National League (NL).

== Playing career ==
Reideborn made his Swedish Hockey League debut playing with Modo Hockey during the 2014–15 SHL season.

After the 2015–16 season, despite appearing in a career high 32 games he was unable to prevent Modo from suffering relegation, Reideborn opted to remain in the SHL, signing a two-year contract to return to Djurgårdens IF. Reideborn was awarded the Honken Trophy as the best goaltender in the 2018–19 SHL regular season.

On 24 May 2019, Reideborn left the SHL after his strong season, securing his first contract abroad, agreeing to a one-year deal with Russian outfit, Ak Bars Kazan of the KHL.

After two season with Ak Bars Kazan, Reideborn left the club as a free agent and signed a two-year contract with CSKA Moscow on 1 June 2021. He won the Gagarin Cup in 2022 and 2023, used as the starting goaltender in his second season with the club.

As a free agent, Reideborn opted to leave the KHL and was signed to a two-year contract with Swiss club, SC Bern of the NL, on 25 May 2023.

== Personal life ==
His sister, Sofia Reideborn, played professionally with SDE Hockey in the SDHL.

== Career statistics ==
=== International ===
Year	Team	Event	Result	GP	W	L	OT	MIN	GA	SO	GAA	SV%
2021	Sweden	WC	9th	5	2	2	0	299	7	1	1.40	.946
Senior totals				5	2	2	0	299	7	1	1.40	.946

== Awards and honours ==
Award	Year
SHL
Best GAA (1.57)	2018
Best SVS% (.938)	2018
Honken Trophy	2019
KHL
Gagarin Cup (CSKA Moscow)	2022, 2023
