= Jakob Lilja =

Swedish professional ice hockey forward (born 1993)

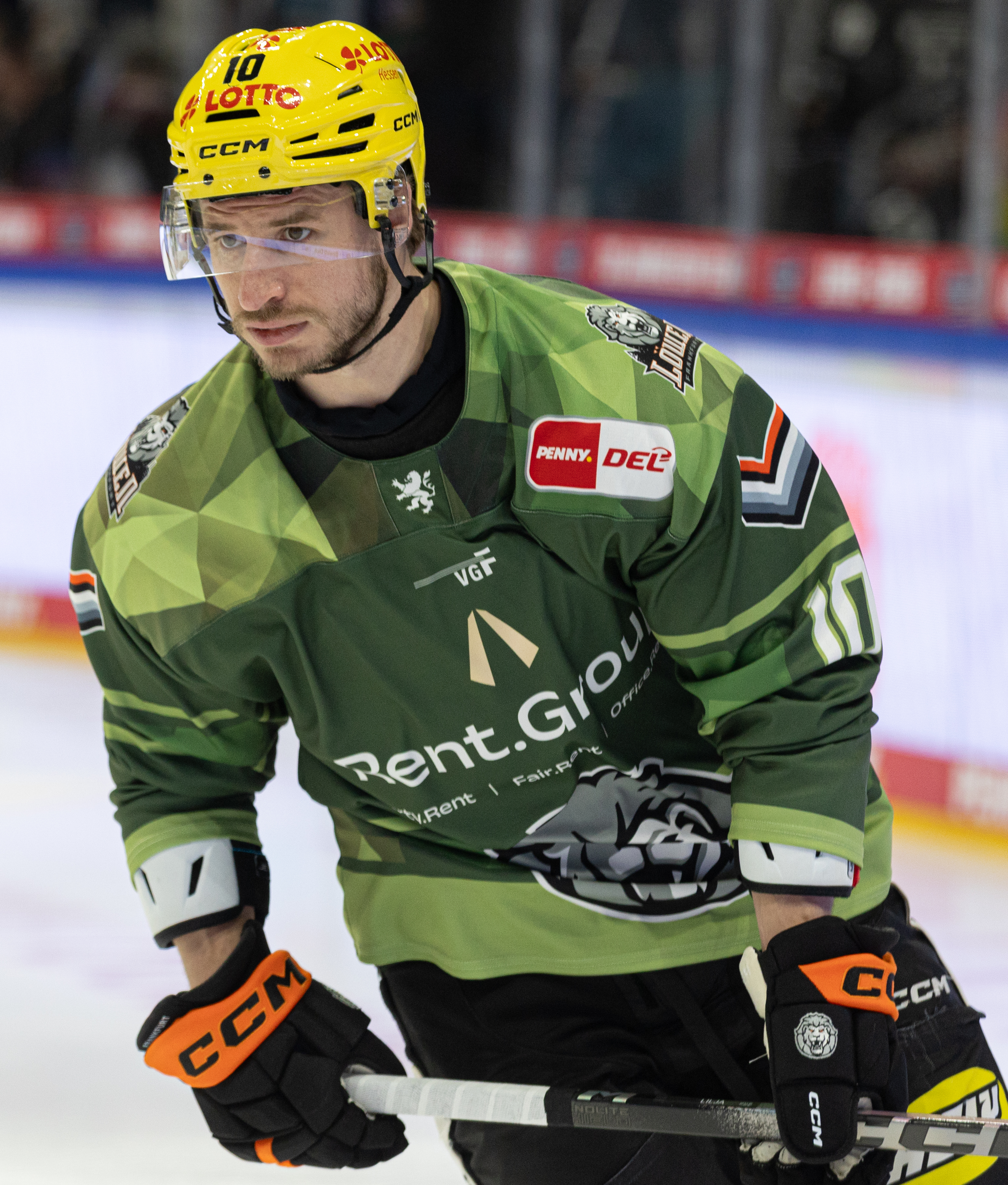
- Lilja in 2025
- Born: 23 July 1993 (age 33) Limhamn, Sweden
- Height: 6 ft 0 in (183 cm)
- Weight: 194 lb (88 kg; 13 st 12 lb)
- Position: Left wing
- Shoots: Left
- NL team Former teams: EV Zug; Rögle BK; Linköping HC; Djurgårdens IF; Columbus Blue Jackets; Barys Nur-Sultan; Dynamo Moscow; HC Ambrì-Piotta; HC Fribourg-Gottéron; Löwen Frankfurt
- NHL draft: Undrafted
- Playing career: 2011–present

Jakob Lilja (born 23 July 1993) is a Swedish professional ice hockey forward currently playing for EV Zug of the Swiss National League.

== Playing career ==
Lilja made his Elitserien (now the SHL) debut playing with Rögle BK during the 2012–13 Elitserien season.

In the 2018–19 season, Lilja registered 12 goals and 25 assists for a career high 37 points in 52 games with Djurgårdens IF. Leading the club and finishing tied 8th in the SHL in assists, and 10th in points, he added 8 points in 19 playoff games to help reach the SHL finals.

Having made 222 appearances in the top flight SHL, Lilja gained the interest of NHL clubs as an undrafted free agent. He later agreed to pursue a North American career with the Columbus Blue Jackets, signing a one-year, entry-level contract on June 15, 2019.

In his first North American season in 2019–20, Lilja made the Blue Jackets opening night roster out of training camp and made his NHL debut against the Toronto Maple Leafs on 4 October 2019. Given a role on the fourth-line, Lilja appeared in 37 games over the course of the regular season, registering 2 goals and 5 points. He split the season with AHL affiliate, the Cleveland Monsters, notching 13 points through 25 contests.

After receiving permission by the Blue Jackets to find a new team during the suspension of the NHL season due to the COVID-19 pandemic, Lilja went to play in Kazakhstan after he was signed to a one-year deal with Kazakh club, Barys Nur-Sultan of the KHL, on 24 June 2020.

Lilya played two seasons with Barys Nur-Sultan before continuing in the KHL on a two-year contract with a Russian based club, HC Dynamo Moscow, on 1 August 2022. In the 2022–23 season, Lilja matched his previous season totals in notching 13 goals and 14 assists for 27 points in his lone season with Dynamo Moscow.

As a free agent, Lilja left the KHL in the off-season and was signed to a two-year contract with Swiss club HC Ambrì-Piotta of the NL, on 1 June 2023.

On 28 October 2024, Lilja was traded from Ambrì-Piotta to HC Fribourg-Gottéron for Canadian centre Chris DiDomenico.

Following the 2024-25 season, Lilja did not receive an extension from Fribourg-Gottéron. He signed a one-year contract with the Löwen Frankfurt in the German Deutsche Eishockey Liga (DEL).

=== Assault case ===
On March 5, 2015 Lilja, while with Rögle BK in Allsvenskan, cross-checked Malmö Redhawks player Jens Olsson from behind in the neck, for which he earned a 10-game suspension. The incident was later brought up in court on an assault charge where on July 10, 2018 the Supreme Court of Sweden, after the case had first gone through the lower District Court of Malmö, handed Lilja a one-month probation sentence.

== Career statistics ==
			Regular season					Playoffs
Season	Team	League	GP	G	A	Pts	PIM	GP	G	A	Pts	PIM
2009–10	Sunne IK	Div.1	3	0	0	0	0	—	—	—	—	—
2010–11	Rögle BK	J20	39	12	13	25	18	3	0	0	0	0
2011–12	Rögle BK	J20	20	8	13	21	16	—	—	—	—	—
2011–12	Rögle BK	Allsv	23	2	2	4	6	10	0	0	0	2
2012–13	Rögle BK	J20	11	10	2	12	6	2	0	1	1	2
2012–13	Rögle BK	SEL	29	1	0	1	4	5	0	1	1	0
2012–13	IF Troja/Ljungby	Allsv	10	0	2	2	2	—	—	—	—	—
2013–14	Rögle BK	Allsv	47	15	7	22	10	8	0	3	3	12
2014–15	Rögle BK	Allsv	51	23	12	35	28	4	1	0	1	25
2015–16	Linköping HC	SHL	52	12	11	23	8	6	0	0	0	0
2016–17	Linköping HC	SHL	49	11	5	16	31	6	0	0	0	0
2017–18	Linköping HC	SHL	40	12	10	22	10	7	3	2	5	0
2018–19	Djurgårdens IF	SHL	52	12	25	37	18	19	3	5	8	6
2019–20	Columbus Blue Jackets	NHL	37	2	3	5	2	—	—	—	—	—
2019–20	Cleveland Monsters	AHL	22	5	8	13	2	—	—	—	—	—
2020–21	Barys Nur-Sultan	KHL	59	20	15	35	8	6	1	0	1	0
2021–22	Barys Nur-Sultan	KHL	47	16	11	27	2	5	2	1	3	0
2022–23	Dynamo Moscow	KHL	52	13	14	27	14	6	1	3	4	0
2023–24	HC Ambrì-Piotta	NL	49	10	18	28	14	4	1	1	2	0
2024–25	HC Ambrì-Piotta	NL	11	0	1	1	2	—	—	—	—	—
2024–25	HC Fribourg-Gottéron	NL	29	10	5	15	4	14	2	3	5	4
2025–26	Löwen Frankfurt	DEL	32	6	10	16	10	—	—	—	—	—
SHL totals			222	48	51	99	71	43	6	8	14	6
NHL totals			37	2	3	5	2	—	—	—	—	—
KHL totals			158	49	40	89	24	17	4	4	8	0
NL totals			89	20	24	44	20	18	3	4	7	4
DEL totals			32	6	10	16	10	—	—	—	—	—
