= Joel Lassinantti =

Swedish ice hockey player

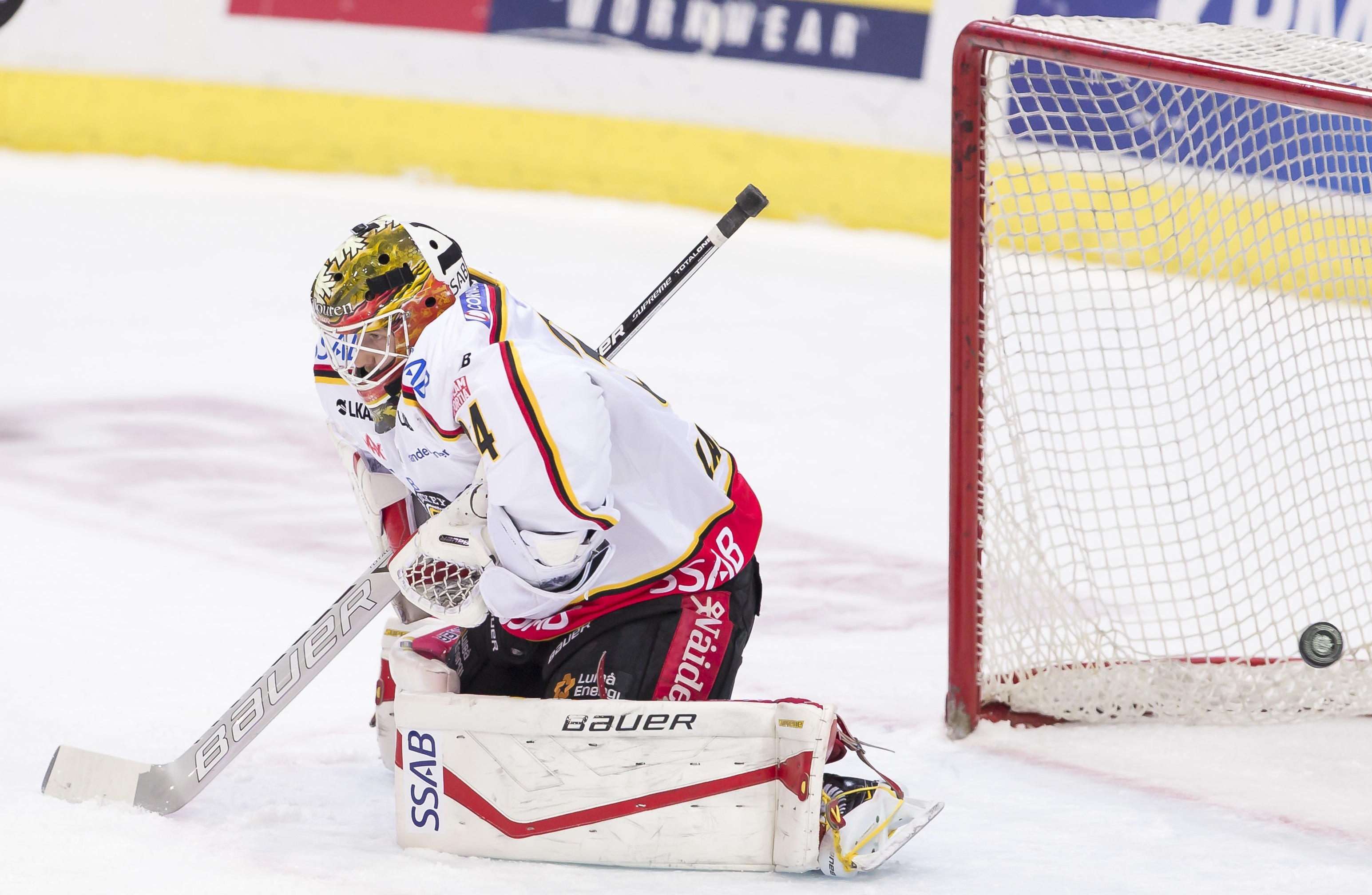
- Joel Lassinantti playing for Luleå HF against Frölunda HC in December 2015
- Born: 8 January 1993 (age 32) Luleå, Sweden
- Height: 175 cm (5 ft 9 in)
- Weight: 82 kg (181 lb; 12 st 13 lb)
- Position: Goaltender
- Catches: Left
- SHL team Former teams: Luleå HF; HC Sochi
- Playing career: 2011–present

Medal record

Ice hockey

Representing Sweden

World Junior Championships
Silver medal – second place	2013 Ufa	

Joel Lassinantti (born 8 January 1993) is a Swedish professional ice hockey goaltender. He currently plays for Luleå HF in the Swedish Hockey League (SHL).

== Playing career ==
Lassinantti previously played the entirety of his career within the Luleå HF organization of the Swedish Hockey League (SHL).

Following his 12th season within Luleå HF, Lassinantti opted to pursue a career away from SHL, agreeing to a one-year contract with Russian club, HC Sochi of the KHL on 16 May 2020. During the 2020–21 KHL season, after playing 15 KHL games, Lassinantti chose to return to Sweden and Luleå HF.

== Awards and honours ==
Award	Year
SHL
Honken Trophy	2015, 2019
Le Mat Trophy (Luleå HF)	2025
