= Christoffer Törngren =

Swedish ice hockey player

- Born: May 16, 1994 (age 31) Vimmerby, Sweden
- Height: 5 ft 10 in (178 cm)
- Weight: 170 lb (77 kg; 12 st 2 lb)
- Position: Right wing
- Shoots: Left
- SHL team Former teams: HV71; Färjestad BK
- Playing career: 2013–present

Christoffer Törngren (born May 16, 1994) is a Swedish professional ice hockey player. He is currently playing with HV71 of the Swedish Hockey League (SHL).

He made his Swedish Hockey League debut playing with HV71 during the 2013–14 SHL season.

== Awards and honors ==
| Award | Year |
|---|---|
SHL
| Le Mat Trophy (HV71) | 2017 |
