= Mattias Guter =

Swedish ice hockey player

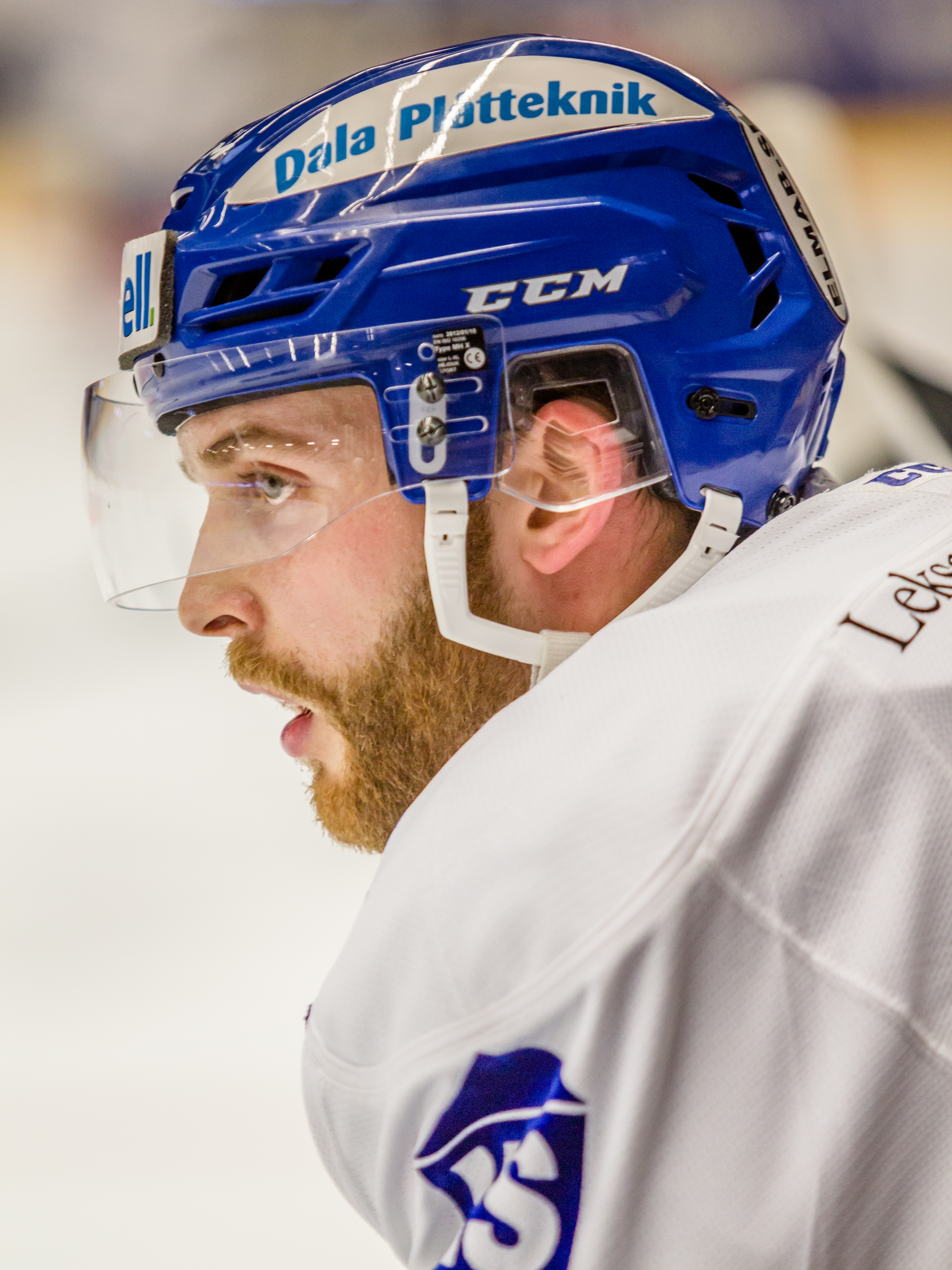
- Born: July 23, 1988 (age 37) Stockholm, Sweden
- Height: 5 ft 9 in (175 cm)
- Weight: 172 lb (78 kg; 12 st 4 lb)
- Position: Right wing
- Shot: Right
- Played for: Leksands IF; Karlskrona HK; Timrå IK; Luleå HF; Djurgårdens IF
- Playing career: 2007–2020

Mattias Guter (born July 23, 1988) is a Swedish former professional ice hockey player. He last played with Djurgårdens IF of the Swedish Hockey League (SHL).

Guter made his Elitserien debut playing with Djurgårdens IF during the 2007–08 Elitserien season.
