= Jonas Gunnarsson (ice hockey) =

Swedish ice hockey player

- Born: March 31, 1992 (age 34) Eksjö, Sweden
- Height: 6 ft 1 in (185 cm)
- Weight: 192 lb (87 kg; 13 st 10 lb)
- Position: Goaltender
- Catches: Left
- SHL team Former teams: HV71; Malmö Redhawks
- NHL draft: Undrafted
- Playing career: 2009–present

Jonas Gunnarsson (born March 31, 1992) is a Swedish professional ice hockey goaltender. He currently plays for HV71 in the Swedish Hockey League (SHL). He has previously played with the Malmö Redhawks and the Milwaukee Admirals.

== Playing career ==
Gunnarsson logged his first minutes in the Swedish Hockey League (SHL) with HV71 during the 2011–12 season. To gain more playing time, he moved to second-division side Malmö Redhawks in 2014 and helped the team earn promotion to the SHL. In the 2015–16 SHL campaign, he made 44 SHL appearances with a goals against average of 2.47 and a save percentage of .913.

On June 1, 2016, he was handed a one-year entry-level contract by the Nashville Predators of the National Hockey League (NHL).
