= Marcus Nilsson (ice hockey) =

Swedish ice hockey player

- Born: May 18, 1991 (age 34); Charlottenberg, Sweden
- Height: 5 ft 7 in (170 cm)
- Weight: 165 lb (75 kg; 11 st 11 lb)
- Position: Forward
- Shoots: Left
- Allsv team Former teams: IF Björklöven; AIK; Färjestad BK; HC Sochi; SCL Tigers
- Playing career: 2009–present

Marcus Nilsson (born May 18, 1991) is a Swedish professional ice hockey player. He is currently playing with IF Björklöven of the HockeyAllsvenskan (Allsv).

== Playing career ==
Nilsson made his Swedish Hockey League (SHL) debut playing with AIK during the 2013–14 SHL season. He later moved to play with Färjestad BK.

On December 5, 2020, Nilsson joined the SCL Tigers of the National League as their fourth import player for the remainder of the 2020–21 season.

== Awards and honours ==
Award	Year
SHL
Le Mat Trophy (Färjestad BK)	2022
