= Emil Larsson (ice hockey) =

Swedish ice hockey player

- Born: 4 August 1993 (age 31); Lugano, Switzerland
- Height: 188 cm (6 ft 2 in)
- Weight: 86 kg (190 lb; 13 st 8 lb)
- Position: Forward
- Shoots: Left
- Allsv team Former teams: MoDo Hockey; Brynäs IF; Luleå HF; Örebro HK; Växjö Lakers
- Playing career: 2013–present

Emil Larsson (born 4 August 1993) is a Swedish professional ice hockey forward who currently plays for MoDo Hockey in the HockeyAllsvenskan (Allsv). He made his Elitserien debut playing with Brynäs IF during the 2012–13 Elitserien season.

Larsson's father is retired hockey player Jan Larsson.
