= Oscar Alsenfelt =

Swedish ice hockey player (born 1987)

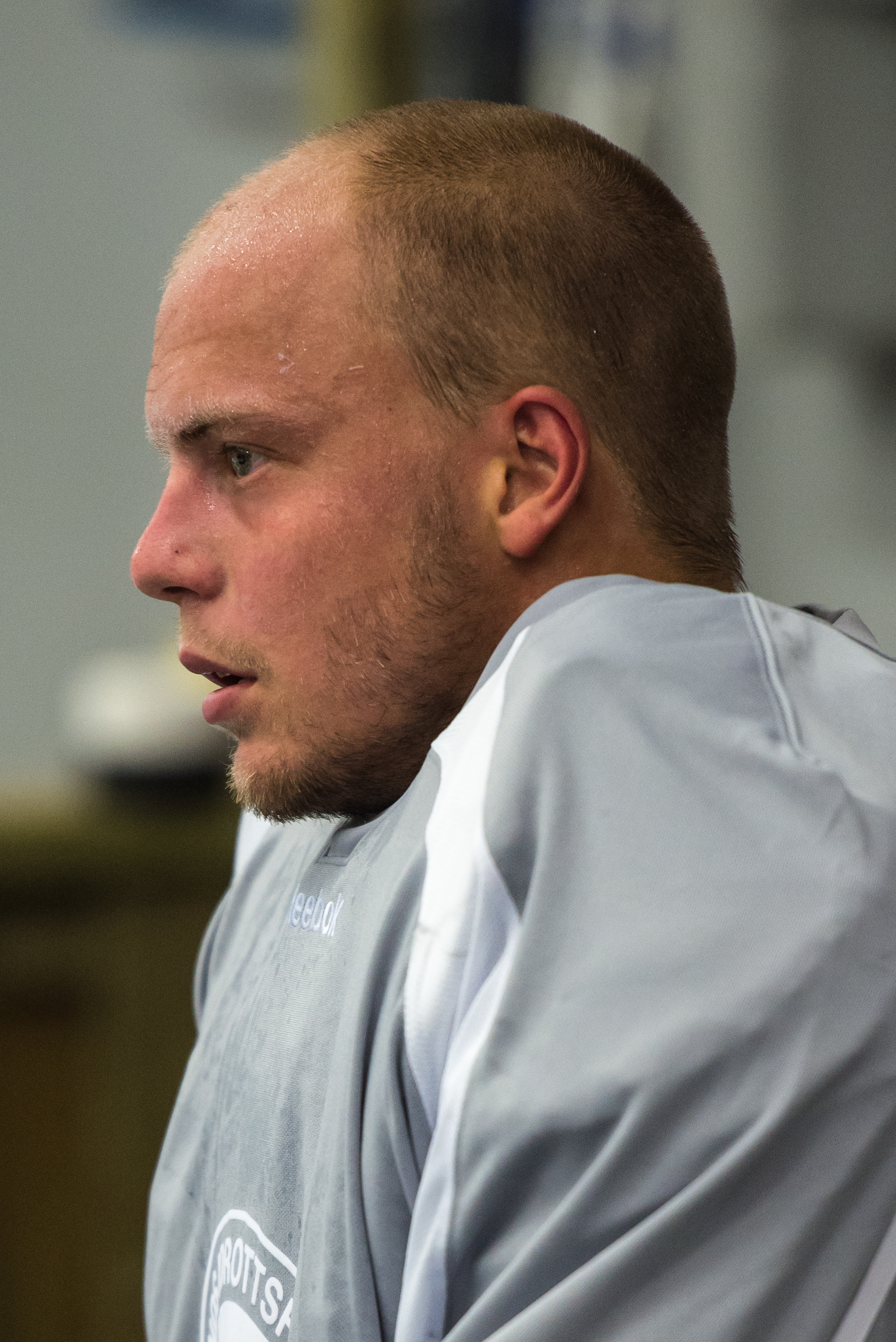
- Oscar Alsenfelt in August 2013
- Born: June 24, 1987 (age 38) Malmö, Sweden
- Height: 6 ft 1 in (185 cm)
- Weight: 187 lb (85 kg; 13 st 5 lb)
- Position: Goaltender
- Caught: Right
- Played for: Modo Hockey; Växjö Lakers; Leksands IF; Malmö Redhawks
- Playing career: 2007–2022

Oscar Alsenfelt (born June 24, 1987) is a Swedish former professional ice hockey goaltender, who is currently the sporting director of the Swedish Women's Hockey League (SDHL).

== Playing career ==
Alsenfelt had a major breakthrough in the 2011 Kvalserien, with the Växjö Lakers. Showing impressive goaltending, he drew attention to hockey experts only after the first two games, despite the fact that these two games were played against familiar teams from the HockeyAllsvenskan. Alsenfelt continued to play for the team in the 2011 Kvalserien's following six rounds, and he became a significant contributor to the team's promotion to the Swedish Hockey League. With a save percentage of .954 in 8 games, he won the 2011 Kvalserien's goaltending league. Alsenfelt, however, did not make his debut game in the top Swedish league until September 27, 2011, when the Lakers won 4–2 at home against Modo Hockey. Alsenfelt stopped 28 shots out of 30 in the game.

Alsenfelt left the Växjö Lakers after the 2011–12 season, playing 17 games and finishing with a 2.18 GAA and a .927 save percentage. He subsequently signed a two-year contract with Modo Hockey set to expire after the 2013–14 season. Oscar was loaned to Leksands IF and would contribute to their promotion to the SHL by playing in the 2013 Kvalserien.
