= 2018–19 Champions Hockey League =

European ice hockey tournament

Tournament details
- Dates: 30 August 2018 – 5 February 2019
- Teams: 32

Final positions
- Champions: (Sweden) Frölunda HC (3rd title)
- Runners-up: (Germany) Red Bull München

Tournament statistics
- Games played: 125
- Goals scored: 738 (5.9 per game)
- Attendance: 425,067 (3,401 per game)
- Scoring leader: (United States) Ryan Lasch (22 points)

Awards
- MVP: (Canada) Trevor Parkes

The 2018–19 Champions Hockey League was the fifth season of the Champions Hockey League, a European ice hockey tournament. The tournament was competed by 32 teams, and qualification was on sporting merits only. The six founding leagues were represented by between three and five teams (based on a four-year league ranking), while seven "challenge leagues" were represented by one team each. One place was awarded to the Continental Cup champion. Unlike in the first three editions, founding teams did not automatically qualify. The group stages began on 30 August 2018, and ended on 17 October 2018. The season had an average attendance of 3,401 per game, one percent increase from the previous season.

Swedish team Frölunda HC won their third Champions Hockey League title, defeating Red Bull München, the first German team to reach the final, 3–1 at the Scandinavium in Gothenburg.

== Team allocation ==
A total of 32 teams from different European first-tier leagues participated in the 2018–19 Champions Hockey League. Besides the Continental Cup champions, 24 teams from the six founding leagues, as well as the national champions from Slovakia, Norway, Denmark, France, Belarus, the United Kingdom and Poland qualified.

The qualification for these places was set out in the rules as follows:

1. National league champion (play-off winners)
2. Regular season winners
3. Regular season runner-up
4. Losing play-off finalist
5. Higher regular season ranked losing semi-finalist
6. Lower regular season ranked losing semi-finalist
7. Third placed team in regular season
8. Fourth placed team in regular season
9. Fifth placed team in regular season.

=== Teams ===
Team	City/Area	League	Qualification	Participation	Previous best
(Finland) JYP	Jyväskylä	SM-liiga	2018 CHL winner	5th	Champion
(Sweden) Växjö Lakers	Växjö	Swedish Hockey League	play-off champion	5th	final
(Sweden) Djurgårdens IF	Stockholm	Swedish Hockey League	regular season runner-up	4th	round of 16
(Sweden) Skellefteå AIK	Skellefteå	Swedish Hockey League	play-off finalist	4th	semi-finals
(Sweden) Malmö Redhawks	Malmö	Swedish Hockey League	play-off semi-finalist	2nd	round of 16
(Sweden) Frölunda HC	Gothenburg	Swedish Hockey League	regular season third place	5th	Champion
(Finland) Kärpät	Oulu	Liiga	play-off champion	4th	final
(Finland) TPS	Turku	Liiga	regular season runner-up	5th	quarter-finals
(Finland) Tappara	Tampere	Liiga	play-off finalist	5th	round of 16
(Finland) HIFK	Helsinki	Liiga	play-off semi-finalist	5th	quarter-finals
(Czech Republic) Kometa Brno	Brno	Czech Extraliga	play-off champion	2nd	quarter-finals
(Czech Republic) HC Plzeň	Plzeň	Czech Extraliga	regular season winner	2nd	round of 32
(Czech Republic) Mountfield HK	Hradec Králové	Czech Extraliga	regular season runner-up	2nd	group stage
(Czech Republic) Oceláři Třinec	Třinec	Czech Extraliga	play-off finalist	4th	semi-finals
(Switzerland) ZSC Lions	Zürich	National League	play-off champion	5th	quarter-finals
(Switzerland) SC Bern	Bern	National League	regular season winner	5th	quarter-finals
(Switzerland) EV Zug	Zug	National League	regular season runner-up	5th	round of 16
(Switzerland) HC Lugano	Lugano	National League	play-off finalist	2nd	round of 16
(Germany) Red Bull München	Munich	Deutsche Eishockey Liga	play-off champion	4th	round of 16
(Germany) Eisbären Berlin	Berlin	Deutsche Eishockey Liga	regular season runner-up	4th	round of 16
(Germany) Nürnberg Ice Tigers	Nuremberg	Deutsche Eishockey Liga	play-off semi-finalist	1st	
(Italy) HC Bolzano	Bolzano	Austrian Hockey League	play-off champion	2nd	group stage
(Austria) Vienna Capitals	Vienna	Austrian Hockey League	regular season first round winner	5th	round of 16
(Austria) Red Bull Salzburg	Salzburg	Austrian Hockey League	regular season pick round runner-up	5th	round of 16
(Belarus) Yunost Minsk	Minsk	Belarusian Extraleague	Continental Cup winner	2nd	round of 32
(Belarus) Neman Grodno	Grodno	Belarusian Extraleague	play-off champion	3rd	group stage
(Slovakia) HC '05 Banská Bystrica	Banská Bystrica	Tipsport Liga	play-off champion	2nd	group stage
(Norway) Storhamar Ishockey	Hamar	GET-ligaen	play-off champion	2nd	round of 16
(United Kingdom) Cardiff Devils	Cardiff	Elite Ice Hockey League	regular season champion	2nd	group stage
(Denmark) Aalborg Pirates	Aalborg	Metal Ligaen	play-off champion	1st	
(France) Dragons de Rouen	Rouen	Ligue Magnus	play-off champion	2nd	group stage
(Poland) GKS Tychy	Tychy	Polska Hokej Liga	play-off champion	1st	

== Group stage ==
Teams in the 2018–19 Champions Hockey League
Black: Group A; Purple: Group B; Blue: Group C; Red: Group D; Orange: Group E; Green: Group F; White: Group G; Yellow: Group H.

For the group stage, the teams were drawn into 8 groups of 4 teams. Each team played home and away against every other team for a total of 6 games. The best 2 teams qualified to the round of 16.

=== Pots ===
As the reigning CHL champions, JYP were the top seeded team. In the top pot were also the reigning champions of the six founding leagues and the regular season winner of SHL. The 16 remaining teams from founding leagues were placed to pots 2 and 3. The fourth pot included playoff champions of seven challenge leagues and Yunost Minsk, the champion of 2017–18 IIHF Continental Cup.

Pot 1	Pot 2	Pot 3	Pot 4
(Finland) JYP (Sweden) Växjö Lakers (Finland) Kärpät (Czech Republic) Kometa Brno (Switzerland) ZSC Lions (Germany) Red Bull München (Italy) HC Bolzano (Sweden) Djurgårdens IF	(Finland) TPS (Czech Republic) HC Plzeň (Switzerland) SC Bern (Germany) Eisbären Berlin (Austria) Vienna Capitals (Sweden) Skellefteå AIK (Finland) Tappara (Czech Republic) Mountfield HK	(Switzerland) EV Zug (Germany) Nürnberg Ice Tigers (Austria) Red Bull Salzburg (Sweden) Malmö Redhawks (Finland) HIFK (Czech Republic) Oceláři Třinec (Switzerland) HC Lugano (Sweden) Frölunda HC	(Slovakia) HC '05 Banská Bystrica (Belarus) Neman Grodno (Norway) Storhamar Ishockey (United Kingdom) Cardiff Devils (Denmark) Aalborg Pirates (France) Dragons de Rouen (Poland) GKS Tychy (Belarus) Yunost Minsk

=== Group stage tie-breaking criteria ===
If two teams were tied in points after the group stage was finished, the teams precedence was decided by head-to-head games. If teams were tied after that, then the team which was ranked higher prior to the tournament took precedence. When comparing head-to-head results, the following criteria were applied:

1. more points in games against the other tied team
2. better goal difference in games against the other tied team
3. more goals scored against the other tied team
4. more goals scored in a single game against the other tied team
5. overtime wins against the other tied team
6. more goals scored in the two game winning shot competitions
7. higher position in the 2017–18 CHL club ranking

=== Group A ===
Pos	Team	Pld	W	OTW	OTL	L	GF	GA	GD	Pts	Qualification	FHC	ZSC	VIC	ABP
1	(Sweden) Frölunda HC	6	4	0	1	1	22	11	+11	13 (Note: Head-to-head points: Frölunda HC 4, ZSC Lions 2.)	Advance to Playoffs	—	4–2	1–4	6–0
2	(Switzerland) ZSC Lions	6	3	2	0	1	26	18	+8	13	Advance to Playoffs	3–2 (SO)	—	7–4	6–5 (OT)
3	(Austria) Vienna Capitals	6	2	0	1	3	19	22	−3	7		1–4	2–6	—	2–3 (OT)
4	(Denmark) Aalborg Pirates	6	0	1	1	4	11	27	−16	3		1–5	1–2	1–6	—

Source: championshockeyleague.net
Rules for classification: Group stage tiebreakers

=== Group B ===
Pos	Team	Pld	W	OTW	OTL	L	GF	GA	GD	Pts	Qualification	MAL	RBM	TPS	YUN
1	(Sweden) Malmö Redhawks	6	4	0	0	2	24	16	+8	12 (Note: Head-to-head goal difference: Malmö Redhawks +4, Red Bull München –4.)	Advance to Playoffs	—	6–1	8–4	4–1
2	(Germany) Red Bull München	6	4	0	0	2	19	17	+2	12	Advance to Playoffs	3–2	—	5–1	4–3
3	(Finland) TPS	6	2	0	0	4	15	21	−6	6 (Note: Head-to-head goal difference: TPS +1, Yunost Minsk –1.)		1–2	5–3	—	3–1
4	(Belarus) Yunost Minsk	6	2	0	0	4	13	17	−4	6		6–2	0–3	2–1	—

Source: championshockeyleague.net
Rules for classification: Group stage tiebreakers

=== Group C ===
Pos	Team	Pld	W	OTW	OTL	L	GF	GA	GD	Pts	Qualification	SKE	HCB	HIFK	GKS
1	(Sweden) Skellefteå AIK	6	4	0	2	0	27	13	+14	14	Advance to Playoffs	—	2–1	3–4 (OT)	6–2
2	(Italy) HC Bolzano	6	2	2	0	2	20	16	+4	10	Advance to Playoffs	4–3 (SO)	—	4–1	6–4
3	(Finland) HIFK	6	2	1	1	2	14	18	−4	9		1–5	1–2 (SO)	—	2–1
4	(Poland) GKS Tychy	6	1	0	0	5	16	30	−14	3		1–8	5–3	3–5	—

Source: championshockeyleague.net

=== Group D ===
Pos	Team	Pld	W	OTW	OTL	L	GF	GA	GD	Pts	Qualification	EVZ	KOM	BER	NEM
1	(Switzerland) EV Zug	6	5	0	1	0	22	12	+10	16	Advance to Playoffs	—	2–1	6–1	2–3 (OT)
2	(Czech Republic) Kometa Brno	6	3	0	0	3	18	16	+2	9	Advance to Playoffs	2–3	—	4–3	6–2
3	(Germany) Eisbären Berlin	6	2	0	0	4	17	21	−4	6		3–5	2–3	—	4–1
4	(Belarus) Neman Grodno	6	1	1	0	4	14	22	−8	5		2–4	4–2	2–4	—

Source: championshockeyleague.net

=== Group E ===
Pos	Team	Pld	W	OTW	OTL	L	GF	GA	GD	Pts	Qualification	TAP	STO	DIF	TRI
1	(Finland) Tappara	6	4	1	1	0	29	12	+17	15	Advance to Playoffs	—	6–1	5–1	3–2 (OT)
2	(Norway) Storhamar Hockey	6	2	1	1	2	17	20	−3	9	Advance to Playoffs	3–2 (SO)	—	2–3 (OT)	6–2
3	(Sweden) Djurgårdens IF	6	2	1	0	3	21	19	+2	8		3–5	5–2	—	3–4
4	(Czech Republic) Oceláři Třinec	6	1	0	1	4	13	29	−16	4		2–8	2–3	1–6	—

Source: championshockeyleague.net

=== Group F ===
Pos	Team	Pld	W	OTW	OTL	L	GF	GA	GD	Pts	Qualification	KAR	DRA	NIT	MHK
1	(Finland) Kärpät	6	4	1	0	1	27	14	+13	14	Advance to Playoffs	—	4–0	9–3	3–2
2	(France) Dragons de Rouen	6	3	0	0	3	15	15	0	9	Advance to Playoffs	2–4	—	4–2	2–0
3	(Germany) Nürnberg Ice Tigers	6	2	1	0	3	17	25	−8	8		4–3	2–5	—	4–3 (OT)
4	(Czech Republic) Mountfield HK	6	1	0	2	3	12	17	−5	5		3–4 (SO)	3–2	1–2	—

Source: championshockeyleague.net

=== Group G ===
Pos	Team	Pld	W	OTW	OTL	L	GF	GA	GD	Pts	Qualification	RBS	SCB	VLH	CAR
1	(Austria) Red Bull Salzburg	6	4	0	1	1	18	15	+3	13 (Note: Head-to-head points: Red Bull Salzburg 4, SC Bern 2.)	Advance to Playoffs	—	2–1	4–3	4–2
2	(Switzerland) SC Bern	6	3	2	0	1	15	11	+4	13	Advance to Playoffs	2–1 (SO)	—	4–3	3–2
3	(Sweden) Växjö Lakers	6	2	1	0	3	21	18	+3	8		5–2	1–2	—	3–1
4	(United Kingdom) Cardiff Devils	6	0	0	2	4	14	24	−10	2		2–5	2–3 (OT)	5–6 (OT)	—

Source: championshockeyleague.net
Rules for classification: Group stage tiebreakers

=== Group H ===
Pos	Team	Pld	W	OTW	OTL	L	GF	GA	GD	Pts	Qualification	HCP	LUG	JYP	BAB
1	(Czech Republic) HC Plzeň	6	5	1	0	0	25	14	+11	17	Advance to Playoffs	—	3–2	4–2	6–4
2	(Switzerland) HC Lugano	6	3	0	0	3	13	12	+1	9	Advance to Playoffs	2–3	—	2–0	4–1
3	(Finland) JYP	6	2	0	0	4	16	14	+2	6		2–6	0–1	—	6–0
4	(Slovakia) HC '05 Banská Bystrica	6	1	0	1	4	13	27	−14	4		2–3 (OT)	5–2	1–6	—

Source: championshockeyleague.net

== Playoffs ==
=== Qualified teams ===
Group	Winners (seed)	Runners-up
A	(Sweden) Frölunda HC (6)	(Switzerland) ZSC Lions
B	(Sweden) Malmö Redhawks (8)	(Germany) Red Bull München
C	(Sweden) Skellefteå AIK (4)	(Italy) HC Bolzano
D	(Switzerland) EV Zug (2)	(Czech Republic) Kometa Brno
E	(Finland) Tappara (3)	(Norway) Storhamar
F	(Finland) Kärpät (5)	(France) Dragons de Rouen
G	(Austria) Red Bull Salzburg (7)	(Switzerland) SC Bern
H	(Czech Republic) HC Plzeň (1)	(Switzerland) HC Lugano

=== Format ===
In each round except the final, the teams played two games and the aggregate score decided the team which advanced. As a rule, the first leg was hosted by the team who had the inferior record in the tournament to that point and the second leg was played on the home ice of the other team. If aggregate score was tied, a sudden death overtime followed. If the overtime is scoreless, the team who wins the game winning shot competition advanced.

The final was played on the home ice of the team who had the better record in the tournament on 5 February 2019.

=== Bracket ===
The eight group winners and the eight second-placed teams advanced to the Round of 16. The teams were divided into two seeding groups and group winners were randomly drawn against runners-up. Teams who had faced each other in the group stage could not be drawn against each other in the round of 16. The draw took place in Helsinki, Finland on 19 October 2018.

Round of 16
1	(Germany) Red Bull München	2	2	4
16	(Switzerland) EV Zug	3	0	3
8	(Switzerland) SC Bern	1	0	1
9	(Sweden) Malmö Redhawks	4	1	5
5	(Switzerland) ZSC Lions	4	2	6
12	(Finland) Kärpät	4	3	7
4	(France) Dragons de Rouen	3	1	4
13	(Austria) Red Bull Salzburg	3	5	8
6	(Czech Republic) Kometa Brno	5	5	10
11	(Finland) Tappara	1	5	6
3	(Switzerland) HC Lugano	1	4	5
14	(Sweden) Frölunda HC	1	5	6
7	(Norway) Storhamar	4	2	6
10	(Sweden) Skellefteå AIK	4	3	7
2	(Italy) HC Bolzano	1	2	3
15	(Czech Republic) HC Plzeň	6	6	12

Quarter-finals
(Germany) Red Bull München (OT)	2	5	7
(Sweden) Malmö Redhawks	1	5	6
(Finland) Kärpät	2	1	3
(Austria) Red Bull Salzburg	3	1	4
(Czech Republic) Kometa Brno	1	1	2
(Sweden) Frölunda HC	4	6	10
(Sweden) Skellefteå AIK	3	1	4
(Czech Republic) HC Plzeň (SO)	3	2	5

Semi-finals
(Germany) Red Bull München	0	3	3
(Austria) Red Bull Salzburg	0	1	1
(Sweden) Frölunda HC	6	3	9
(Czech Republic) HC Plzeň	3	1	4

Final
(Germany) Red Bull München	1
(Sweden) Frölunda HC	3

Note:

1. The teams listed on top of each tie were runners up in the group stage and play the first leg at home. The bottom team were group winners and play the second leg at home. The Malmö Redhawks, however, ended up playing their first leg at home due to their arena being reserved on 20 November.
2. The order of the legs (which team starts at home) in the future rounds may be changed as the team with the best record should have the second game at home.

=== Round of 16 ===
==== First Leg ====
6 November 2018; 18:00 CET	Malmö Redhawks (Sweden)	4–1 (0–0, 2–1, 2–0)	(Switzerland) SC Bern	Malmö Arena, Malmö; Attendance: 2,543

Game reference

Lars Volden
Goalies
Leonardo Genoni
Referees:
Christopher Hurtik
Gordon Schukies
Linesmen:
Ludvig Lundgren
Anders Nyqvist

Hetta (Bryggman, Mylläri) – 23:37	1–0
	1–1	31:51 – Bieber (Arcobello, Moser)
Setkov (Wemmenborn, Hetta) – 35:44	2–1
Sylvegård (Bryggman, Volden) – 54:43	3–1
Mylläri (Hardt, Storm) – 58:07	4–1

12 min
Penalties
10 min
27
Shots
28

6 November 2018; 18:00 CET	Kometa Brno (Czech Republic)	5–1 (2–0, 1–1, 2–0)	(Finland) Tappara	DRFG Arena, Brno; Attendance: 3,365

Game reference

Karel Vejmelka
Goalies
Christian Heljanko
Referees:
Mikael Andersson
Mikael Sjöqvist
Linesmen:
Miroslav Lhotský
Jiří Svoboda

Čermák (Dočekal, Köhler) – 7:40	1–0
Plášek (Mikyska) – 9:11	2–0
Mueller (Dočekal) – 22:18	3–0
	3–1	24:05 – Moilanen (Kemiläinen, Levtchi)
Holík (Kašpar, Mueller) – 48:08	4–1
Čermák (Mallet) – 53:04	5–1

10 min
Penalties
6 min
26
Shots
32

6 November 2018; 18:30 CET	Storhamar Hockey (Norway)	4–4 (0–0, 3–4, 1–0)	(Sweden) Skellefteå AIK	CC Amfi, Hamar; Attendance: 4,850

Game reference

Oskar Östlund
Goalies
Gustaf Lindvall
Referees:
Ladislav Smetana
Trpimir Piragić
Linesmen:
Jon Kilian
Knut Einar Bråten

	0–1	20:40 – Olimb (Ericsson)
Thoresen – 25:31	1–1
	1–2	29:32 – Hedberg (Norén)
	1–3	31:21 – Djuse (Olimb, Lindström)
	1–4	31:47 – Norén
Svensson (Thoresen, Johansson) (PP) – 37:29	2–4
Larrivée (Irving, Jensen) – 38:09	3–4
Jakobs (Thoresen) (PP) – 46:19	4–4

8 min
Penalties
8 min
24
Shots
31

6 November 2018; 19:45 CET	ZSC Lions (Switzerland)	4–4 (2–2, 1–0, 1–2)	(Finland) Kärpät	Hallenstadion, Zürich; Attendance: 3,510

Game reference

Niklas Schlegel
Goalies
Veini Vehviläinen
Referees:
Marcus Linde
Mikael Nord
Linesmen:
Franco Castelli
Dominik Altmann

	0–1	0:44 – Heponiemi
Klein – 8:47	1–1
Prassl (Noreau, Schlegel) – 15:42	2–1
	2–2	18:41 – (SHG) Lasu (Lindsten, Ohtamaa)
Pettersson (Suter) – 33:47	3–2
	3–3	51:20 – (PP) Lasu
	3–4	58:53 – (PP) Heshka (Kivihalme, Leskinen)
Pettersson (Suter, Noreau) – 59:58	4–4

12 min
Penalties
6 min
29
Shots
22

6 November 2018; 19:45 CET	HC Bolzano (Italy)	1–6 (0–2, 1–3, 0–1)	(Czech Republic) HC Plzeň	Eiswelle, Bolzano; Attendance: 4,850

Game reference

Leland Irving (pulled at 40:00) Jacob Smith
Goalies
Dmitri Milchakov
Referees:
Daniel Piechaczek
Marian Rohatsch
Linesmen:
Ulrich Pardatscher
Jakob Schauer

	0–1	4:28 – Allen (Kaňák, Eberle)
	0–2	6:52 – Indrák (Kodýtek)
Petan (Kuparinen, Frigo) – 22:41	1–2
	1–3	25:08 – Indrák (Kindl, Kodýtek)
	1–4	32:03 – Gulaš (Kracík)
	1–5	38:49 – Indrák (Kaňák)
	1–6	49:22 – Straka

39 min
Penalties
33 min
21
Shots
41

6 November 2018; 19:45 CET	HC Lugano (Switzerland)	1–1 (0–0, 1–1, 0–0)	(Sweden) Frölunda HC	Cornèr Arena, Porza; Attendance: 3,846

Game reference
Elvis Merzlikins	Goalies	Johan Mattsson	Referees: Lasse Heikkinen; Stefan Fonselius; Linesmen: Stany Gnemmi; Dario Fuchs
/ 0–1 / 25:46 – Westerholm (Westerholm); Haapala (Sannitz, Hofmann) – 38:21 / 1–1			Referees: Lasse Heikkinen; Stefan Fonselius; Linesmen: Stany Gnemmi; Dario Fuchs
8 min	Penalties	8 min	Referees: Lasse Heikkinen; Stefan Fonselius; Linesmen: Stany Gnemmi; Dario Fuchs
22	Shots	40	Referees: Lasse Heikkinen; Stefan Fonselius; Linesmen: Stany Gnemmi; Dario Fuchs

6 November 2018; 20:00 CET	Red Bull München (Germany)	2–3 (0–1, 2–1, 0–1)	(Switzerland) EV Zug	Olympia Eishalle, Munich; Attendance: 2,290

Game reference

Danny aus den Birken
Goalies
Tobias Stephan
Referees:
Manuel Nikolić
Miroslav Stolc
Linesmen:
Kilian Hinterdobler
Andreas Hofer

	0–1	9:20 – Schlumpf (Simion)
	0–2	28:13 – Martschini (Suri)
Shugg (Aulie) – 29:35	1–2
Mitchell – 32:25	2–2
	2–3	57:58 – Martschini (Suri, Albrecht)

26 min
Penalties
4 min
26
Shots
30

6 November 2018; 20:00 CET	Dragons de Rouen (France)	3–3 (2–2, 1–1, 0–0)	(Austria) Red Bull Salzburg	Île Lacroix, Rouen; Attendance: 2,746

Game reference

Matija Pintarič
Goalies
Stephen Michalek
Referees:
Marc Wiegand
Thomas Urban
Linesmen:
Clément Goncalves
Nicolas Constantineau

Thinel (Dusseau, Langlais) – 13:24	1–0
	1–1	14:55 – Hochkofler (Huber)
	1–2	15:38 – Vandevelde (Raymond, Feldner)
Deschamps (Aleardi, Brodeur) – 18:35	2–2
Ritz (Lampérier, Guttig) (PP) – 21:49	3–2
	3–3	39:32 – Štajnoch (Raymond, Harris)

6 min
Penalties
6 min
24
Shots
31

==== Second Leg ====
20 November 2018; 17:00 CET	HC Plzeň (Czech Republic)	6–2 (1–0, 4–2, 1–0)	(Italy) HC Bolzano	Home Monitoring Aréna, Plzeň; Attendance: 4,831

Game reference

Dmitri Milchakov
Goalies
Jacob Smith (pulled at 25:29) Leland Irving
Referees:
Marcus Linde
Marc Lemelin
Linesmen:
Jiří Ondráček
Josef Špůr

Gulaš (PS) – 15:13	1–0
Gulaš (Němec) – 21:16	2–0
Gulaš (Němec) – 23:44	3–0
Preisinger (Indrák) (PP) – 25:29	4–0
	4–1	28:58 – Insam (Kuparinen)
Gulaš – 33:33	5–1
	5–2	33:56 – Findlay
Indrák (Kaňák, Gulaš) – 51:04	6–2

4 min
Penalties
8 min
40
Shots
22

HC Plzeň won 12–3 on Aggregate.

20 November 2018; 18:00 CET	Frölunda HC (Sweden)	5–4 (1–1, 1–2, 3–1)	(Switzerland) HC Lugano	Frölundaborg, Gothenburg; Attendance: 2,469

Game reference

Johan Gustafsson
Goalies
Elvis Merzlikins
Referees:
Jan Hribik
Robin Šír
Linesmen:
Henrik Pihlblad
Anders Nyqvist

Sigalet (Fagemo, Lasch) – 0:50	1–0
	1–1	11:33 – Bertaggia (Chorney, Romanenghi)
	1–2	31:17 – Bertaggia (Romanenghi)
	1–3	32:35 – Lajunen (Jörg, Walker)
Lasch (Rakhshani, Genoway) (PP 5 ON 3) – 34:30	2–3
Stålberg (Lindström, Sigalet) – 45:12	3–3
	3–4	48:56 – (PP) Sannitz (Hofmann, Klasen)
Grönlund (Fagemo, Lasch) – 52:08	4–4
Lasch (Rakhshani, Genoway) (PP) – 57:13	5–4

6 min
Penalties
10 min
38
Shots
27

Frölunda HC won 6–5 on Aggregate.

20 November 2018; 18:00 CET	Skellefteå AIK (Sweden)	3–2 (1–2, 2–0, 0–0)	(Norway) Storhamar Hockey	Skellefteå Kraft Arena, Skellefteå; Attendance: 1,524

Game reference

Mantas Armalis
Goalies
Oskar Östlund
Referees:
Mikko Kaukokari
Kristian Vikman
Linesmen:
Emil Yletyienen
Johannes Käck

	0–1	5:18 – (PP) Thoresen (Zettergren)
Aaltonen (Holloway, Möller) (PP) – 9:16	1–1
	1–2	12:26 – (PP) Johansson (Svensson, Dahlstrøm)
Holloway (Möller, Holloway) (PP) – 28:09	2–2
Holloway (Ericsson, Djuse) – 31:42	3–2

10 min
Penalties
6 min
24
Shots
20

Skellefteå AIK won 7–6 on Aggregate.

20 November 2018; 18:00 CET	Kärpät (Finland)	3–2 (1–1, 0–1, 2–0)	(Switzerland) ZSC Lions	Oulun Energia Areena, Oulu; Attendance: 3,441

Game reference

Veini Vehviläinen
Goalies
Lukas Flüeler
Referees:
Linus Öhlund
Tobias Björk
Linesmen:
Henri Neva
Hannu Sormunen

Kivihalme (Krištof, Heshka) – 10:38	1–0
	1–1	13:12 – (PP) Baltisberger (Pettersson, Suter)
	1–2	21:20 – Bachofner (Suter)
Koblížek (Lasu) – 43:37	2–2
Koblížek (Lasu, Kukkonen) – 58:47	3–2

10 min
Penalties
4 min
26
Shots
30

Oulun Kärpät won 7–6 on Aggregate.

20 November 2018; 18:00 CET	Tappara (Finland)	5–5 (2–0, 1–2, 2–3)	(Czech Republic) Kometa Brno	Hakametsä Stadium, Tampere; Attendance: 4,049

Game reference

Christian Heljanko
Goalies
Karel Vejmelka
Referees:
Joris Müller
Marc Wiegand
Linesmen:
Lauri Nikulainen
Jani Pesonen

Vittasmaki (Kemiläinen) – 2:02	1–0
Elias (Elorinne, Malinen) – 11:01	2–0
	2–1	23:30 – Kašpar
	2–2	24:42 – Zaťovič (Mueller)
Erkinjuntti (Järvinen, Vittasmaki) – 30:04	3–2
Erkinjuntti (Kemiläinen, Ojamäki) (PP) – 44:54	4–2
	4–3	48:07 – Hruška
	4–4	53:25 – (PP) Mueller (Zaťovič, Holík)
	4–5	55:46 – Dočekal (Köhler, Čermák)
Jasu (Järvinen, Malinen) (PP) – 57:41	5–5

8 min
Penalties
12 min
30
Shots
22

Kometa Brno won 10–6 on Aggregate.

20 November 2018; 19:30 CET	Red Bull Salzburg (Austria)	5–1 (2–0, 1–1, 2–0)	(France) Dragons de Rouen	Eisarena Salzburg, Salzburg; Attendance: 2,177

Game reference

Stephen Michalek
Goalies
Matija Pintarič
Referees:
Oldřich Hejduk
Antonín Jeřábek
Linesmen:
Elias Seewald
David Nothegger

Duncan (Hughes, Heinrich) (PP) – 11:19	1–0
Harris (Herburger, Vandevelde) – 18:57	2–0
	2–1	27:00 – Bedin
Raffl (Regner, Hughes) – 27:47	3–1
Raymond (Hochkofler) – 56:35	4–1
Duncan (Huber, Hughes) (ENG) – 58:29	5–1

8 min
Penalties
6 min
51
Shots
22

Red Bull Salzburg won 8–4 on Aggregate.

20 November 2018; 19:45 CET	SC Bern (Switzerland)	0–1 (0–0, 0–0, 0–1)	(Sweden) Malmö Redhawks	PostFinance Arena, Bern; Attendance: 13,573

Game reference
Leonardo Genoni	Goalies	Oscar Alsenfelt	Referees: Daniel Piechaczek; Lasse Kopitz; Linesmen: Franco Castelli; Dario Fuchs
0–1 / 58:38 – (ENG) Warg (Sylvegård, Ekberg)			Referees: Daniel Piechaczek; Lasse Kopitz; Linesmen: Franco Castelli; Dario Fuchs
6 min	Penalties	8 min	Referees: Daniel Piechaczek; Lasse Kopitz; Linesmen: Franco Castelli; Dario Fuchs
27	Shots	17	Referees: Daniel Piechaczek; Lasse Kopitz; Linesmen: Franco Castelli; Dario Fuchs

Malmö Redhawks won 5–1 on Aggregate.

20 November 2018; 19:45 CET	EV Zug (Switzerland)	0–2 (0–0, 0–1, 0–1)	(Germany) Red Bull München	Bossard Arena, Zug; Attendance: 4,946

Game reference
Tobias Stephan	Goalies	Danny aus den Birken	Referees: Ladislav Smetana; Manuel Nikolić; Linesmen: Simon Wust; Dominik Altmann
0–1 / 21:07 – (PP) Shugg (Joslin, Mitchell); 0–2 / 54:52 – Mauer (Voakes)			Referees: Ladislav Smetana; Manuel Nikolić; Linesmen: Simon Wust; Dominik Altmann
6 min	Penalties	8 min	Referees: Ladislav Smetana; Manuel Nikolić; Linesmen: Simon Wust; Dominik Altmann
37	Shots	25	Referees: Ladislav Smetana; Manuel Nikolić; Linesmen: Simon Wust; Dominik Altmann

Red Bull München won 4–3 on Aggregate.

=== Quarter-finals ===
==== First Leg ====
4 December 2018; 18:00 CET	Kometa Brno (Czech Republic)	1–4 (1–1, 0–3, 0–0)	(Sweden) Frölunda HC	DRFG Arena, Brno; Attendance: 3,290

Game reference

Lukáš Dostál
Goalies
Johan Gustafsson
Referees:
Marc Lemelin
Daniel Stricker
Linesmen:
Jiří Ondráček
Rudolf Tošenovjan

Köhler (Zohorna, Mikyska) (PP) – 9:57	1–0
	1–1	19:33 – (PP) Carlsson (Lasch, Rakhshani)
	1–2	20:17 – Carlsson (Lasch, Genoway)
	1–3	27:21 – Rosseli Olsen (Friberg, Mustonen)
	1–4	30:54 – (PP 5 on 3) Genoway (Lasch, Carlsson)

16 min
Penalties
10 min
17
Shots
30

4 December 2018; 18:00 CET	Skellefteå AIK (Sweden)	3–3 (0–1, 0–2, 3–0)	(Czech Republic) HC Plzeň	Skellefteå Kraft Arena, Skellefteå; Attendance: 1,570

Game reference

Mantas Armalis
Goalies
Dmitri Milchakov
Referees:
Kristian Vikman
Lasse Heikkinen
Linesmen:
Emil Yletyienen
Johannes Käck

	0–1	11:20 – Gulaš (Kantner)
	0–2	25:17 – Kantner
	0–3	28:22 – Kodýtek (Straka, Kvasnička)
Aaltonen (Wingerli, Alm) – 47:25	1–3
Lindström (Aaltonen, Djuse) – 52:55	2–3
Lindström (Granberg, Alm) – 57:06	3–3

8 min
Penalties
10 min
35
Shots
25

4 December 2018; 19:30 CET	Red Bull München (Germany)	2–1 (0–0, 0–0, 2–1)	(Sweden) Malmö Redhawks	Olympia Eishalle, Munich; Attendance: 3,440

Game reference

Danny aus den Birken
Goalies
Cristopher Nihlstorp
Referees:
Manuel Nikolić
Kristian Nikolić
Linesmen:
Andreas Hofer
Kilian Hinterdobler

	0–1	45:38 – Storm (Torp, Hetta)
Joslin (Eder) – 47:14	1–1
Mauer (Kastner, Bodnarchuk) – 53:37	2–1

8 min
Penalties
8 min
31
Shots
29

4 December 2018; 19:30 CET	Red Bull Salzburg (Austria)	3–2 (0–0, 1–0, 2–2)	(Finland) Kärpät	Eisarena Salzburg, Salzburg; Attendance: 2,786

Game reference

Stephen Michalek
Goalies
Veini Vehviläinen
Referees:
Mikael Sjöqvist
Sören Persson
Linesmen:
David Nothegger
Elias Seewald

Harris (Vandevelde, Raymond) – 21:29	1–0
Harris (Trattnig, Pallestrang) – 41:53	2–0
	2–1	43:30 – Lasu (Hakanpää)
	2–2	49:33 – Junnila (Karvinen, Kukkonen)
Hughes (Raymond, Raffl) – 59:37	3–2

6 min
Penalties
4 min
26
Shots
25

==== Second Leg ====
11 December 2018; 17:00 CET	HC Plzeň (Czech Republic)	2–1 (3–1 SO) (0–0, 0–0, 1–1) (0–0) (SO 3–1)	(Sweden) Skellefteå AIK	Home Monitoring Aréna, Plzeň; Attendance: 4,224

Game reference

Dominik Frodl
Goalies
Gustaf Lindvall
Referees:
Daniel Piechaczek
Marian Rohatsch
Linesmen:
Josef Špůr
Jiří Svoboda

	0–1	57:32 – (PP) Alvarez (Pudas, Aaltonen)
Kindl (Gulaš, Kovář (EA) – 59:24	1–1
Kovář (SO) – 70:00	2–1

Kratěna (miss)
Kodýtek
Kovář
Gulaš
Shootout
Pudas
(miss) Lindström
(miss) Lindström
(miss) Möller
8 min
Penalties
12 min
35
Shots
37

HC Plzeň won 5–4 on Aggregate after winning 3–1 in a shootout.

11 December 2018; 18:00 CET	Frölunda HC (Sweden)	6–1 (0–1, 3–0, 3–0)	(Czech Republic) Kometa Brno	Frölundaborg, Gothenburg; Attendance: 2,058

Game reference

Johan Gustafsson
Goalies
Karel Vejmelka
Referees:
Marc Wiegand
Alessandro DiPietro
Linesmen:
Henrik Pihlblad
Anders Nyqvist

	0–1	2:26 – Meluzín (Mlynář, Schaus)
Genoway (Carlsson, Stålberg) – 20:39	1–1
Carlsson (Söderlund, Westerlund) – 26:10	2–1
Genoway (Carlsson, Rakhshani) (PP) – 29:42	3–1
Westerholm (Sigalet, Friberg) (PP) – 41:07	4–1
Rakhshani (Westerlund, Nørstebø) – 43:58	5–1
Westerholm (Fagemo, Westerholm) – 53:59	6–1

2 min
Penalties
8 min
43
Shots
15

Frölunda HC won 10–2 on Aggregate.

11 December 2018; 18:00 CET	Malmö Redhawks (Sweden)	5–5 (OT) (2–1, 2–3, 1–0) (OT 0–1)	(Germany) Red Bull München	Malmö Arena, Malmö; Attendance: 2,493

Game reference

Oscar Alsenfelt
Goalies
Danny aus den Birken
Referees:
Antonín Jeřábek
Jan Hribik
Linesmen:
Ludvig Lundgren
Örjan Åhlen

Sylvegård (Lerby) – 2:58	1–0
Olofsson (Händemark) (PP) – 11:38	2–0
	2–1	19:56 – (PP) Parkes (Ehliz, Mitchell)
	2–2	21:17 – Parkes (Mitchell)
	2–3	24:26 – Shugg (Voakes)
Olofsson (Janolhs) – 34:53	3–3
Olsson (Komarek, Setkov) – 38:40	4–3
	4–4	39:43 – Boyle (Mitchell, Parkes)
Storm (Warg) – 53:16	5–4
	5–5	64:02 – Parkes (Mitchell)

6 min
Penalties
10 min
31
Shots
27

Red Bull München won 7–6 on Aggregate in Overtime.

11 December 2018; 18:00 CET	Kärpät (Finland)	1–1 (0–1, 1–0, 0–0)	(Austria) Red Bull Salzburg	Oulun Energia Areena, Oulu; Attendance: 3,565

Game reference
Veini Vehviläinen	Goalies	Stephen Michalek	Referees: Linus Öhlund; Tobias Björk; Linesmen: Lauri Nikulainen; Jani Pesonen
/ 0–1 / 14:23 – (PP) Rauchenwald (Herburger, Viveiros); Osala (Heponiemi) – 21:47 / 1–1			Referees: Linus Öhlund; Tobias Björk; Linesmen: Lauri Nikulainen; Jani Pesonen
6 min	Penalties	10 min	Referees: Linus Öhlund; Tobias Björk; Linesmen: Lauri Nikulainen; Jani Pesonen
45	Shots	13	Referees: Linus Öhlund; Tobias Björk; Linesmen: Lauri Nikulainen; Jani Pesonen

Red Bull Salzburg won 4–3 on Aggregate.

=== Semi-finals ===
==== First Leg ====
8 January 2019; 18:00 CET	Frölunda HC (Sweden)	6–3 (2–1, 3–1, 1–1)	(Czech Republic) HC Plzeň	Frölundaborg, Gothenburg; Attendance: 2,975

Game reference

Johan Gustafsson
Goalies
Dmitri Milchakov (pulled at 29:49) Dominik Frodl
Referees:
Mikko Kaukokari
Kristian Vikman
Linesmen:
Henrik Pihlblad
Anders Nyqvist

Mustonen (Ekbom) (SHG) – 5:45	1–0
Rakhshani (Lasch, Genoway) (PP) – 11:43	2–0
	2–1	18:48 – (SHG) Allen
	2–2	24:31 – Allen (Straka, Jones)
Lasch (Carlsson, Fagemo) – 27:54	3–2
Grönlund (Rakhshani, Friberg) – 29:49	4–2
Hjalmarsson (Stålberg, Sigalet) – 31:06	5–2
Rakhshani (Lasch, Lundqvist) (PP) – 47:57	6–2
	6–3	50:56 – Allen (Gulaš, Kovář)

12 min
Penalties
14 min
26
Shots
27

8 January 2019; 19:30 CET	Red Bull München (Germany)	0–0 (0–0, 0–0, 0–0)	(Austria) Red Bull Salzburg	Olympia Eishalle, Munich; Attendance: 6,142

Game reference
Danny aus den Birken	Goalies	Stephen Michalek	Referees: Marc Lemelin; Daniel Stricker; Linesmen: Kilian Hinterdobler; Andreas Hofer
18 min	Penalties	12 min	Referees: Marc Lemelin; Daniel Stricker; Linesmen: Kilian Hinterdobler; Andreas Hofer
31	Shots	26	Referees: Marc Lemelin; Daniel Stricker; Linesmen: Kilian Hinterdobler; Andreas Hofer

==== Second Leg ====
15 January 2019; 17:30 CET	HC Plzeň (Czech Republic)	1–3 (0–1, 0–0, 1–2)	(Sweden) Frölunda HC	Home Monitoring Aréna, Plzeň; Attendance: 5,105

Game reference
Johan Gustafsson	Goalies	Dominik Frodl	Referees: Daniel Piechaczek; Marian Rohatsch; Linesmen: Daniel Hynek; Miroslav Lhotský
Kindl – 50:42 / Goals / 3:12 – Lasch (Carlsson, Moverare) / 41:59 – (PP) Hjalmarsson (Lindström, Westerholm) / 42:41 – Mustonen			Referees: Daniel Piechaczek; Marian Rohatsch; Linesmen: Daniel Hynek; Miroslav Lhotský
10 min	Penalties	8 min	Referees: Daniel Piechaczek; Marian Rohatsch; Linesmen: Daniel Hynek; Miroslav Lhotský
16	Shots	21	Referees: Daniel Piechaczek; Marian Rohatsch; Linesmen: Daniel Hynek; Miroslav Lhotský

Frölunda HC won 9–4 on Aggregate.

16 January 2019; 20:20 CET	Red Bull Salzburg (Austria)	1–3 (1–2, 0–0, 0–1)	(Germany) Red Bull München	Eisarena Salzburg, Salzburg; Attendance: 3,400

Game reference

Stephen Michalek
Goalies
Danny aus den Birken
Referees:
Mikael Nord
Sören Persson
Linesmen:
Elias Seewald
David Nothegger

Rauchenwald (Pallestrang) – 13:26	1–0
	1–1	16:57 – Kastner (Voakes, Seidenberg)
	1–2	19:54 – Seidenberg (Wolf, Joslin)
	1–3	49:59 – Hager (Ehliz, Wolf)

2 min
Penalties
4 min
26
Shots
35

Red Bull München won 3–1 on Aggregate.

=== Final ===
5 February 2019; 19:00 (UTC+1)	Frölunda HC (Sweden)	3–1 (1–0, 2–0, 0–1)	(Germany) Red Bull München	Scandinavium, Gothenburg; Attendance: 12,044

Game reference

Johan Gustafsson
Goalies
Danny aus den Birken
Referees:
(Finland) Mikko Kaukokari
(Austria) Mark Lemelin
Linesmen:
(Finland) Hannu Sormunen
(Switzerland) Balazs Kovacs

Fagemo (Genoway, Friberg) (PP) – 10:32	1–0
Lasch (Lundqvist, Hjalmarsson) (PP) – 24:16	2–0
Westerholm (Hjalmarsson, Lundqvist) (PP) – 34:27	3–0
	3–1	51:29 – Ehliz (Seidenberg, Voakes) (PP, EA)

14 min
Penalties
24 min
31
Shots
36

== Statistics ==
=== Scoring leaders ===
The following players led the league in points.

Player	Team	GP	G	A	PTS	PIM	+/–	GWG	PPG	SHG	SOG	S%
(United States) Ryan Lasch	(Sweden) Frölunda HC	13	5	17	22	6	+4	2	3	0	26	19.23%
(Canada) Chay Genoway	(Sweden) Frölunda HC	13	6	10	16	35	+1	0	4	0	36	16.67%
(Canada) John Mitchell	(Germany) Red Bull München	11	2	12	14	24	+6	0	1	0	26	7.69%
(Sweden) Nicklas Lasu	(Finland) Kärpät	9	8	5	13	2	+4	1	4	2	25	32.00%
(Czech Republic) Milan Gulaš	(Czech Republic) HC Plzeň	10	8	5	13	8	+11	2	2	0	38	21.05%
(Canada) Trevor Parkes	(Germany) Red Bull München	9	9	3	12	18	+5	3	2	1	29	31.03%
(Finland) Jarkko Malinen	(Finland) Tappara	7	2	10	12	2	+4	0	0	0	11	18.18%
(Sweden) Oscar Möller	(Sweden) Skellefteå AIK	10	7	4	11	0	+6	1	2	0	48	14.58%
(Czech Republic) David Stach	(Czech Republic) HC Plzeň	10	3	8	11	0	–2	1	2	0	18	16.67%
(Austria) Peter Schneider	(Austria) Vienna Capitals	6	7	3	10	29	0	1	4	0	27	25.93%

=== Leading goaltenders ===
The following goaltenders led the league in save percentage, provided that they have played at least 40% of their team's minutes.

Player	Team	GP	W	L	SV	GA	SV%	GAA	SO	MIN
(Sweden) Cristopher Nihlstorp	(Sweden) Malmö Redhawks	4	2	2	108	7	93.91%	1.75	0	240
(United States) Steve Michalek	(Austria) Red Bull Salzburg	10	4	3	264	19	93.29%	1.90	0	600
(Slovenia) Matija Pintarič	(France) Dragons de Rouen	8	3	4	290	21	93.25%	2.65	1	475
(Sweden) Johan Mattsson	(Sweden) Frölunda HC	6	3	2	122	9	93.13%	1.69	0	319
(Switzerland) Leonardo Genoni	(Switzerland) SC Bern	8	5	3	203	15	93.12%	1.86	1	483

=== Home Game and Overall ===
As of 5 February 2019

Pos.	Team	Regular season		Playoffs		Overall			2017–18 average
Pos.	Team	Matches	Attendance	Matches	Attendance	Matches	Total	Average	2017–18 average
1	(Switzerland) SC Bern	3	25,547	1	13,573	4	39,120	9,780	10,617
2	(Belarus) Yunost Minsk	3	13,554	0	–	3	13,554	4,518	–
3	(Norway) Storhamar Ishockey	3	12,859	1	4,850	4	17,709	4,427	–
4	(Sweden) Växjö Lakers	3	13,122	0	–	3	13,122	4,374	4,096
5	(Finland) HIFK	3	13,022	0	–	3	13,022	4,341	3,313
6	(Czech Republic) HC Plzeň	3	11,212	3	14,160	6	25,372	4,229	–
7	(Germany) Nürnberg Ice Tigers	3	12,533	0	—	3	12,533	4,178	–
8	(Switzerland) EV Zug	3	11,615	1	4,946	4	16,561	4,140	3,976
9	(Sweden) Frölunda HC	3	7,769	4	19,546	7	27,315	3,902	2,539
10	(Switzerland) HC Lugano	3	11,179	1	3,846	4	15,025	3,756	–
11	(Italy) HC Bolzano	3	9,781	1	4,850	4	14,631	3,658	–
12	(Finland) Tappara	3	10,250	1	4,049	4	14,299	3,575	3,936
13	(Germany) Eisbären Berlin	3	10,665	0	–	3	10,665	3,555	–
14	(Czech Republic) Kometa Brno	3	10,318	2	6,655	5	16,973	3,395	3,829
15	(Switzerland) ZSC Lions	3	9,900	1	3,510	4	13,410	3,353	3,534
16	(Finland) Kärpät	3	9,683	2	7,006	5	16,689	3,338	–
17	(Finland) JYP	3	9,949	0	—	3	19,208	3,316	3,201
18	(Germany) Red Bull München	3	7,080	3	11,872	6	18,952	3,159	2,393
19	(Czech Republic) Oceláři Třinec	3	9,466	0	–	3	9,466	3,155	3,909
20	(France) Dragons de Rouen	3	8,134	1	2,746	4	10,880	2,720	–
21	(Austria) Vienna Capitals	3	8,000	0	—	3	8,000	2,667	2,167
22	(Sweden) Malmö Redhawks	3	8,003	2	5,036	5	13,039	2,608	1,244
23	(Finland) TPS	3	7,504	0	—	3	7,504	2,501	2,972
24	(Wales) Cardiff Devils	3	7,323	0	—	3	7,323	2,441	2,436
25	(Belarus) Neman Grodno	3	7,028	0	—	3	7,028	2,343	2,245
26	(Sweden) Djurgårdens IF	3	6,955	0	—	3	11,033	2,318	–
27	(Czech Republic) Mountfield HK	3	6,814	0	—	3	6,814	2,271	3,102
28	(Austria) Red Bull Salzburg	3	5,008	3	8,363	6	13,371	2,229	1,954
29	(Poland) GKS Tychy	3	6,494	0	—	3	6,494	2,165	–
30	(Slovakia) HC '05 Banská Bystrica	3	5,511	0	—	3	5,511	1,837	1,964
31	(Sweden) Skellefteå AIK	3	5,749	2	3,094	3	8,843	1,769	–
32	(Denmark) Aalborg Pirates	3	4,938	0	—	3	4,938	1,646	–
Tournament total		96	306,965	29	118,102	125	425,067	3,401	3,338

Source: Champions Hockey League.
