= Lasu =

Lasu may refer to:

== People ==
- Amy Lasu (born 1995), South Sudanese football player
- Nicklas Lasu (born 1989), Swedish ice hockey player

== Places ==
- Lasu, Khuzestan, Iran

== Other ==
- Lagos State University
