= Sigalet =

Sigalet is a surname. Notable people with the surname include:

- Jonathan Sigalet (born 1986), Canadian ice hockey player
- Jordan Sigalet (born 1981), Canadian ice hockey player
