= Ponthus Westerholm =

Swedish ice hockey player (born 1992)

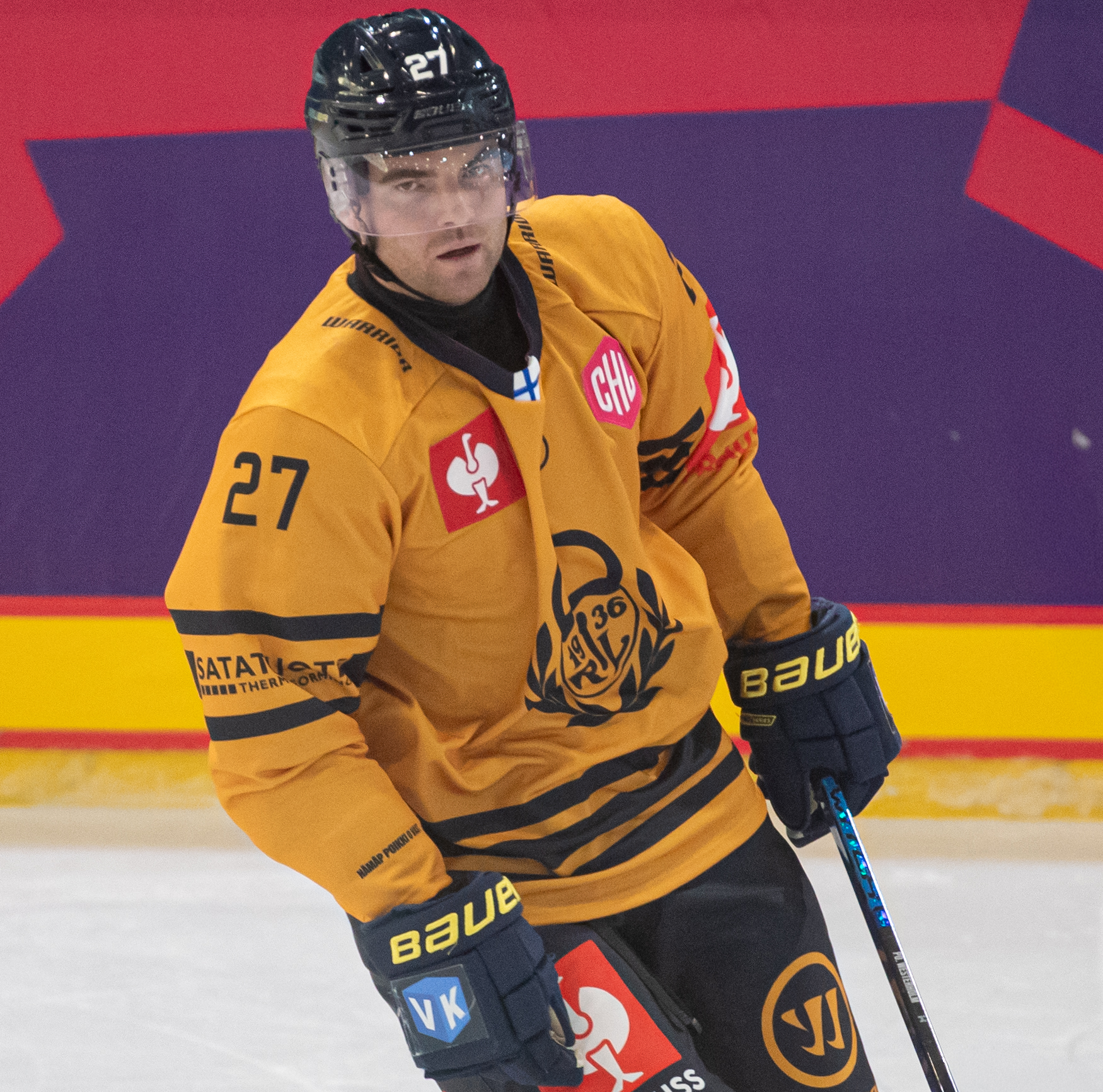
- Westerholm in 2025
- Born: 6 January 1992 (age 34) Karlskrona, Sweden
- Height: 6 ft 0 in (183 cm)
- Weight: 190 lb (86 kg; 13 st 8 lb)
- Position: Right wing
- Shoots: Right
- Liiga team Former teams: Lukko; Brynäs IF; Frölunda HC; Malmö Redhawks
- NHL draft: Undrafted
- Playing career: 2010–present

Ponthus Westerholm (born 6 January 1992) is a Swedish ice hockey player. He is currently playing with Lukko of the Liiga.

== Playing career ==
Westerholm made his Swedish Hockey League debut playing with Brynäs IF during the 2014–15 SHL season. Ponthus' twin brother Pathrik is also a professional hockey player.

On 3 May 2017, Westerholm left Brynäs alongside brother Pathrik, and signed a two-year contract with Frölunda HC.

After claiming the Swedish Championship in his final season under contract in 2018–19 season, Westerholm left as a free agent to move to the Finnish Liiga, again alongside Pathrik, agreeing to a one-year deal with Lukko on May 8, 2019.

== Awards and honours ==
Award	Year
CHL
Champions (Frölunda HC)	2019
SHL
Le Mat Trophy (Frölunda HC)	2019
