= Patrik Carlsson =

Swedish ice hockey player

- Born: November 3, 1987 (age 37); Kungälv, Sweden
- Height: 5 ft 10 in (178 cm)
- Weight: 179 lb (81 kg; 12 st 11 lb)
- Position: Right wing
- Shoots: Left
- SHL team Former teams: Frölunda HC; Södertälje SK; HV71; HIFK
- Playing career: 2005–present

Patrik Karl Gunnar Carlsson (born November 3, 1987) is a Swedish professional ice hockey right winger, currently playing for Frölunda HC of the Swedish Hockey League (SHL). He has played for seven different teams over the course of a 15 year career (as of 2019).

== Career statistics ==
			Regular season					Playoffs
Season	Team	League	GP	G	A	Pts	PIM	GP	G	A	Pts	PIM
2004–05	Frölunda HC	J20	13	1	3	4	4	—	—	—	—	—
2005–06	Frölunda HC	J20	30	18	14	32	20	7	6	1	7	16
2005–06	Frölunda HC	SEL	12	2	3	5	0	5	0	0	0	0
2006–07	Frölunda HC	J20	12	6	7	13	4	7	3	3	6	14
2006–07	Frölunda HC	SEL	16	0	0	0	4	—	—	—	—	—
2006–07	Växjö Lakers	Allsv	15	3	1	4	6	—	—	—	—	—
2007–08	Växjö Lakers	Allsv	43	9	11	20	37	3	0	0	0	2
2008–09	Växjö Lakers	Allsv	43	14	10	24	62	15	4	10	14	6
2009–10	Leksands IF	Allsv	41	10	24	34	6	10	1	0	1	2
2010–11	Södertälje SK	SEL	54	10	16	26	45	—	—	—	—	—
2011–12	HV71	SEL	48	1	3	4	4	6	0	1	1	0
2012–13	HV71	SEL	53	14	10	24	16	5	3	0	3	2
2013–14	HV71	SHL	52	15	12	27	18	8	3	2	5	2
2014–15	HV71	SHL	51	8	10	18	12	5	0	2	2	2
2015–16	Frölunda HC	SHL	51	6	18	24	12	15	0	4	4	6
2016–17	Frölunda HC	SHL	44	11	13	24	8	14	2	3	5	0
2017–18	HIFK	Liiga	53	7	21	28	10	14	5	5	10	2
2018–19	Frölunda HC	SHL	45	12	18	30	8	16	2	12	14	2
2019–20	Frölunda HC	SHL	48	9	18	27	14	—	—	—	—	—
2020–21	Frölunda HC	SHL	50	12	17	29	12	7	0	2	2	0
2021–22	Frölunda HC	SHL	46	7	9	16	4	9	5	4	9	0
SHL totals			570	107	147	254	157	90	15	30	45	14
Liiga totals			53	7	21	28	10	14	5	5	10	2

== Awards and honors ==
Award	Year
SHL
Le Mat Trophy (Frölunda HC)	2016, 2019
CHL
Champions (Frölunda HC)	2016, 2017, 2019
