= Samuel Fagemo =

Swedish ice hockey player (born 2000)

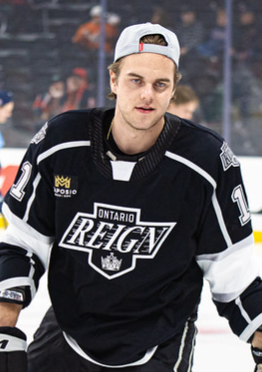
- Fagemo in 2025
- Born: 14 March 2000 (age 26) Gothenburg, Sweden
- Height: 6 ft 0 in (183 cm)
- Weight: 200 lb (91 kg; 14 st 4 lb)
- Position: Right wing
- Shoots: Right
- SHL team Former teams: Frölunda HC; Los Angeles Kings; Nashville Predators
- NHL draft: 50th overall, 2019; Los Angeles Kings
- Playing career: 2017–present

Samuel Fagemo (born 14 March 2000) is a Swedish professional ice hockey player currently playing with Frölunda HC of the Swedish Hockey League (SHL). He was selected by the Los Angeles Kings in the second round, 50th overall, of the 2019 NHL entry draft.

== Playing career ==
During his Under 15 season, Fagemo won a silver medal at the TV-pucken, a Swedish national ice hockey tournament.

The following season, Fagemo was called up Frölunda HC J20 where he scored in his debut on 22 October 2016, to help Frölunda beat Rögle BK 4–2. However, during the 2016–17 season Fagemo incurred a wrist injury as a result of an accidental collision with a teammate. He was forced to miss five months to recover.

Fagemo made his Swedish Hockey League (SHL) debut in 2017, playing two games with Frölunda HC in the 2017–18 season.

Although Fagemo went undrafted into the National Hockey League, he was invited to the Arizona Coyotes development camp prior to the 2018–19 season as a free agent. While attending their development camp, Fagemo was drafted by the Halifax Mooseheads of the Canadian Hockey League (CHL) in the 2018 CHL Import Draft. He became the first Swedish player since 1994 to be drafted by the Mooseheads.

During the 2018–19 season, Fagemo scored his first SHL goal on 13 October 2018 against Färjestad BK. During the 2018–19 Champions Hockey League, Fagemo scored a hat trick in a 6–0 win over the Aalborg Pirates. In 42 regular season games, Fagemo registered 14 goals and 25 points. He finished his rookie season, leading all first-year players with 6 playoff goals and tied for the rookie lead in points during the postseason with 10 to help Frölunda HC win the Le Mat Trophy.

On 21 June 2019, Fagemo was selected by the Los Angeles Kings in the second round, 50th overall, in the 2019 NHL entry draft. After attending the Kings development camp, on 11 July 2019, Fagemo was signed to a three-year, entry-level contract with Los Angeles.

On 2 October 2023, Fagemo was claimed off waivers by the Nashville Predators after being placed on them by the Kings the previous day. Remaining on the roster to begin the 2023–24 season, Fagemo made his debut with the Predators and opened the scoring in a 5-1 victory over the San Jose Sharks on October 21, 2023. As a frequent healthy scratch, Fagemo made 4 appearances with the Predators before he was returned to waivers and re-claimed by the Kings on November 11, 2023. He was immediately reassigned to AHL affiliate, the Ontario Reign.

As a free agent at the conclusion of his fifth season with the Kings, Fagemo joined the Winnipeg Jets, signing a one-year, two-way contract on 2 July 2025. For the duration of his contract with the Jets, Fagemo was assigned to AHL affiliate, the Manitoba Moose, for the duration of the 2025–26 season, posting 19 goals through 72 regular season games.

As a pending free agent from the Jets, Fagemo opted to return to Sweden in signing a three-year contract with original club, Frölunda HC of the SHL, on 20 May 2026.

== International play ==
Medal record

Representing Sweden

Ice hockey

World Junior Championships
| Bronze medal – third place | 2020 Czech Republic | |

World U18 Championships
| Bronze medal – third place | 2018 Russia | |

Fagemo was selected for Team Sweden to compete at the 2016 World U-17 Hockey Challenge. There he scored seven points in six games to be named to the U17 WHC All-Star Team, and win a gold medal.

Fagemo then participated in the 2017 Ivan Hlinka Memorial Tournament and 2018 IIHF World U18 Championships where he helped Sweden win a bronze medal in both tournaments.

On 26 December 2018, Fagemo was selected for Team Sweden's 2019 World Junior Ice Hockey Championships roster.

== Personal life ==
Fagemo's father is former professional SHL player Linus Fagemo.

== Career statistics ==
=== Regular season and playoffs ===
| | | | Regular season | | | | | Playoffs |
| Season | Team | League | GP | G | A | Pts | PIM | GP | G | A | Pts | PIM |
|---|---|---|---|---|---|---|---|---|---|---|---|---|
| 2016–17 | Frölunda HC | J20 | 8 | 1 | 1 | 2 | 4 | — | — | — | — | — |
| 2017–18 | Frölunda HC | J20 | 37 | 19 | 11 | 30 | 30 | 5 | 5 | 1 | 6 | 4 |
| 2017–18 | Frölunda HC | SHL | 2 | 0 | 0 | 0 | 0 | — | — | — | — | — |
| 2017–18 | Södertälje SK | Allsv | 3 | 1 | 0 | 1 | 2 | — | — | — | — | — |
| 2018–19 | Frölunda HC | J20 | 8 | 10 | 4 | 14 | 2 | — | — | — | — | — |
| 2018–19 | Frölunda HC | SHL | 42 | 14 | 11 | 25 | 6 | 16 | 6 | 4 | 10 | 4 |
| 2019–20 | Frölunda HC | SHL | 42 | 13 | 9 | 22 | 10 | — | — | — | — | — |
| 2020–21 | Södertälje SK | Allsv | 18 | 6 | 5 | 11 | 4 | — | — | — | — | — |
| 2020–21 | Ontario Reign | AHL | 32 | 10 | 8 | 18 | 4 | 1 | 0 | 1 | 1 | 0 |
| 2021–22 | Ontario Reign | AHL | 63 | 27 | 17 | 44 | 38 | 5 | 3 | 0 | 3 | 0 |
| 2021–22 | Los Angeles Kings | NHL | 4 | 0 | 0 | 0 | 0 | — | — | — | — | — |
| 2022–23 | Ontario Reign | AHL | 56 | 23 | 9 | 32 | 8 | 1 | 0 | 0 | 0 | 0 |
| 2022–23 | Los Angeles Kings | NHL | 9 | 2 | 1 | 3 | 0 | — | — | — | — | — |
| 2023–24 | Nashville Predators | NHL | 4 | 1 | 0 | 1 | 0 | — | — | — | — | — |
| 2023–24 | Ontario Reign | AHL | 50 | 43 | 19 | 62 | 26 | 8 | 2 | 3 | 5 | 0 |
| 2023–24 | Los Angeles Kings | NHL | 4 | 0 | 0 | 0 | 0 | — | — | — | — | — |
| 2024–25 | Ontario Reign | AHL | 67 | 29 | 17 | 46 | 32 | 2 | 0 | 0 | 0 | 2 |
| 2025–26 | Manitoba Moose | AHL | 72 | 19 | 16 | 35 | 22 | 7 | 2 | 0 | 2 | 0 |
| SHL totals | | | 86 | 27 | 20 | 47 | 16 | 16 | 6 | 4 | 10 | 4 |
| NHL totals | | | 21 | 3 | 1 | 4 | 0 | — | — | — | — | — |

=== International ===
| Year | Team | Event | Result | GP | G | A | Pts | PIM |
|---|---|---|---|---|---|---|---|---|
| 2016 | Sweden | U17 | 1st place, gold medalist(s) | 6 | 2 | 5 | 7 | 0 |
| 2017 | Sweden | IH18 | 3rd place, bronze medalist(s) | 5 | 5 | 0 | 5 | 0 |
| 2018 | Sweden | U18 | 3rd place, bronze medalist(s) | 7 | 0 | 2 | 2 | 0 |
| 2019 | Sweden | WJC | 5th | 5 | 0 | 1 | 1 | 2 |
| 2020 | Sweden | WJC | 3rd place, bronze medalist(s) | 7 | 8 | 5 | 13 | 6 |
| Junior totals | | | | 30 | 15 | 13 | 28 | 8 |

== Awards and honours ==
| Award | Year |
|---|---|
CHL
| Champions (Frölunda HC) | 2019 |
SHL
| Le Mat Trophy (Frölunda HC) | 2019 |
