= Filip Westerlund =

Swedish ice hockey player

- Born: 17 April 1999 (age 27) Härnösand, Sweden
- Height: 5 ft 11 in (180 cm)
- Weight: 180 lb (82 kg; 12 st 12 lb)
- Position: Defence
- Shoots: Left
- Liiga team Former teams: KalPa; Frölunda HC; Timrå IK; HV71; Ilves
- NHL draft: 44th overall, 2017; Arizona Coyotes
- Playing career: 2016–present

Filip Westerlund (born 17 April 1999) is a Swedish professional ice hockey defenceman. He is currently playing for KalPa of the Finnish Liiga. Westerlund was drafted by the Arizona Coyotes in the second round, 44th overall, of the 2017 NHL entry draft.

== Playing career ==
Westerlund first played as a youth with hometown club, AIK Härnösand until the J18 Elit level. In his second season within the Frölunda HC organization, Westerlund made his SHL debut in the 2016–17 campaign, featuring in 33 games from the blueline for 4 assists.

During the final year of his contract with Frölunda in the 2018–19 season, Westerlund registered 2 points in 19 games before he was loaned for the remainder of the year to fellow SHL club, Timrå IK, on January 23, 2019. Westerlund notched two goals in 4 games before his season was ended through injury, unable to help Timrå avoid relegation to the Allsvenskan.

Out of contract with Frölunda, Westerlund opted to continue with Timrå IK in the HockeyAllsvenskan, securing a one-year deal on 19 August 2019.

After four seasons with Timrå IK, Westerlund left the club at the conclusion of his contract, joining newly promoted HV71 by agreeing to a two-year contract on 17 May 2022.

In August of 2023 he signed a one-year contract with KalPa in the Finnish Liiga for the 2023–24 season.

== Career statistics ==
=== Regular season and playoffs ===
			Regular season					Playoffs
Season	Team	League	GP	G	A	Pts	PIM	GP	G	A	Pts	PIM
2015–16	Frölunda HC	J20	3	0	0	0	2	—	—	—	—	—
2016–17	Frölunda HC	J20	23	1	6	7	8	5	0	1	1	6
2016–17	Frölunda HC	SHL	33	0	4	4	6	—	—	—	—	—
2017–18	Frölunda HC	J20	24	4	9	13	12	2	1	0	1	0
2017–18	Frölunda HC	SHL	19	0	2	2	4	—	—	—	—	—
2017–18	IF Björklöven	Allsv	13	1	3	4	6	3	0	0	0	2
2018–19	Frölunda HC	SHL	19	1	1	2	6	—	—	—	—	—
2018–19	Timrå IK	SHL	4	2	0	2	0	—	—	—	—	—
2019–20	Timrå IK	Allsv	52	4	17	21	12	1	1	1	2	0
2020–21	Timrå IK	Allsv	52	5	16	21	16	15	1	6	7	6
2021–22	Timrå IK	SHL	50	2	3	5	4	—	—	—	—	—
2022–23	HV71	SHL	18	1	0	1	6	—	—	—	—	—
2022–23	Ilves	Liiga	20	2	2	4	4	10	1	1	2	2
2023–24	KalPa	Liiga	59	9	7	16	12	13	1	2	3	8
SHL totals			143	6	10	16	22	—	—	—	—	—
Liiga totals			79	11	9	20	16	23	2	3	5	10

=== International ===
Year	Team	Event	Result	GP	G	A	Pts	PIM
2015	Sweden	U17	3rd place, bronze medalist(s)	6	0	0	0	0
2017	Sweden	U18	4th	7	1	1	2	4
2019	Sweden	WJC	5th	5	1	1	2	4
Junior totals				18	2	2	4	8

== Awards and honors ==
Award	Year
CHL
Champions (Frölunda HC)	2017, 2019
