= Chay Genoway =

Canadian ice hockey player (born 1986)

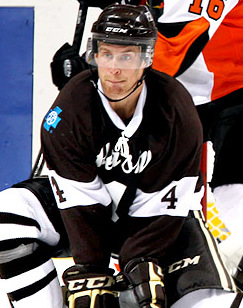
- Genoway with the Hershey Bears in 2013
- Born: December 20, 1986 (age 39) Morden, Manitoba, Canada
- Height: 5 ft 9 in (175 cm)
- Weight: 177 lb (80 kg; 12 st 9 lb)
- Position: Defence
- Shoots: Left
- ICEHL team Former teams: EC Red Bull Salzburg; Minnesota Wild; Dinamo Riga; Spartak Moscow; Jokerit; Lada Togliatti; Frölunda HC; Torpedo Nizhny Novgorod; Avtomobilist Yekaterinburg; Brynäs IF
- National team: Canada
- NHL draft: Undrafted
- Playing career: 2011–present

Charles "Chay" Genoway (born December 20, 1986) is a Canadian professional ice hockey defenceman. He is currently playing with EC Red Bull Salzburg of the ICE Hockey League (ICEHL). He was selected and played for the Canadian men's ice hockey team at the 2018 Winter Olympics.

== Playing career ==
An undrafted free agent from Morden, Manitoba, Genoway graduated from the University of North Dakota as the fourth-highest-scoring defenceman in UND history with 127 points in 168 career games. His 168 games are tied for the most by a UND defenceman, and he also ranks tied for second all-time among UND players rearguards in game-winning goals (seven), fourth in power-play goals (14), fifth in assists (101), and seventh in goals (26).

Upon completion of his collegiate career, Genoway was signed to a one-year entry-level contract with the Minnesota Wild on April 12, 2011. In the 2011–12 season, his first as a professional, Genoway was assigned to AHL affiliate the Houston Aeros. In 72 games as a fixture on the Aeros blueline, he scored 7 goals and 36 points. He received his first NHL recall at the tail end of the season and made his NHL debut, registering an assist, in a solitary game for the Wild against the Phoenix Coyotes on April 7, 2012.

On June 29, 2012, he was re-signed to a one-year extension with the Wild. After 52 games with the Aeros during his second season within the Wild organization in 2012–13, he was traded to the Washington Capitals in exchange for a conditional seventh-round pick on March 14, 2013.

On August 1, 2014, having left the Capitals organization as a free agent, Genoway signed abroad on a one-year deal with Dinamo Riga of the Kontinental Hockey League (KHL). After a year in Riga, he moved on to fellow KHL team HC Spartak Moscow, where he spent the 2015–16 season. In May 2016, he signed with Jokerit, a Helsinki-based KHL team.

In the 2018–19 season, Genoway played under a one-year contract with Frölunda HC of the Swedish Hockey League (SHL). Genoway contributed to a highly successful season with Frölunda recording 9 goals and 25 points in 51 games in claiming the domestic Le Mat Trophy. He also led defenseman in points throughout the tournament to help claim the 2019 Champions Hockey League.

At the conclusion of his contract with Frölunda, Genoway opted to return to the KHL, agreeing to a one-year contract with Russian club, Torpedo Nizhny Novgorod on May 7, 2019. Genoway established new career highs in the KHL during the 2019–20 season, notching 25 assists and 31 points in 62 regular season games.

As a free agent, Genoway opted to continue in the KHL, securing a one-year contract with Avtomobilist Yekaterinburg on May 4, 2020.

Following the 2020–21 season, Genoway left the KHL after two further years and continued his journeyman career in returning to the SHL in signing an optional two-year contract with Brynäs IF on July 8, 2021.

As a free agent at the conclusion of his contract in the SHL, Genoway opted to continue his European career by signing a one-year deal with Austrian club, EC Red Bull Salzburg of the ICEHL on June 23, 2022.

== International play ==
Medal record

Representing Canada

Ice hockey

Olympic Games
| Bronze medal – third place | 2018 Pyeongchang | |

On January 11, 2018, Genoway was named to the Canadian men's ice hockey team for the 2018 Winter Olympics in Pyeongchang, South Korea. He registered 1 assist in 6 games to help Canada claim the bronze medal.

== Career statistics ==
=== Regular season and playoffs ===
| | | | Regular season | | | | | Playoffs |
| Season | Team | League | GP | G | A | Pts | PIM | GP | G | A | Pts | PIM |
|---|---|---|---|---|---|---|---|---|---|---|---|---|
| 2001–02 | Pembina Valley Hawks AAA | MMHL | 40 | 29 | 26 | 55 | 44 | 4 | 1 | 2 | 3 | 4 |
| 2002–03 | Pembina Valley Hawks | MMHL | 30 | 24 | 33 | 57 | 42 | 1 | 1 | 1 | 2 | 2 |
| 2002–03 | Winkler Flyers | MJHL | 4 | 0 | 1 | 1 | 10 | 6 | 0 | 2 | 2 | 6 |
| 2003–04 | Shattuck-Saint Mary's | HS-MN | 65 | 23 | 39 | 62 | 52 | — | — | — | — | — |
| 2004–05 | Shattuck-Saint Mary's | HS-MN | 65 | 20 | 43 | 63 | 62 | — | — | — | — | — |
| 2005–06 | Vernon Vipers | BCHL | 56 | 17 | 32 | 49 | 71 | 10 | 0 | 8 | 8 | 9 |
| 2006–07 | University of North Dakota | WCHA | 43 | 5 | 14 | 19 | 42 | — | — | — | — | — |
| 2007–08 | University of North Dakota | WCHA | 38 | 8 | 21 | 29 | 46 | — | — | — | — | — |
| 2008–09 | University of North Dakota | WCHA | 42 | 3 | 29 | 32 | 46 | — | — | — | — | — |
| 2009–10 | University of North Dakota | WCHA | 9 | 4 | 6 | 10 | 6 | — | — | — | — | — |
| 2010–11 | University of North Dakota | WCHA | 36 | 6 | 31 | 37 | 26 | — | — | — | — | — |
| 2011–12 | Houston Aeros | AHL | 72 | 7 | 29 | 36 | 29 | 4 | 0 | 0 | 0 | 4 |
| 2011–12 | Minnesota Wild | NHL | 1 | 0 | 1 | 1 | 0 | — | — | — | — | — |
| 2012–13 | Houston Aeros | AHL | 53 | 4 | 15 | 19 | 41 | — | — | — | — | — |
| 2012–13 | Hershey Bears | AHL | 12 | 1 | 5 | 6 | 8 | 1 | 0 | 0 | 0 | 4 |
| 2013–14 | Hershey Bears | AHL | 52 | 4 | 10 | 14 | 28 | — | — | — | — | — |
| 2014–15 | Dinamo Riga | KHL | 59 | 9 | 14 | 23 | 30 | — | — | — | — | — |
| 2015–16 | Spartak Moscow | KHL | 56 | 9 | 20 | 29 | 8 | — | — | — | — | — |
| 2016–17 | Jokerit | KHL | 52 | 7 | 18 | 25 | 43 | 4 | 0 | 2 | 2 | 2 |
| 2017–18 | Lada Togliatti | KHL | 56 | 5 | 19 | 24 | 30 | — | — | — | — | — |
| 2018–19 | Frölunda HC | SHL | 51 | 9 | 16 | 25 | 12 | 16 | 5 | 8 | 13 | 4 |
| 2019–20 | Torpedo Nizhny Novgorod | KHL | 62 | 6 | 25 | 31 | 22 | 4 | 1 | 0 | 1 | 12 |
| 2020–21 | Avtomobilist Yekaterinburg | KHL | 58 | 3 | 22 | 25 | 52 | 5 | 0 | 0 | 0 | 2 |
| 2021–22 | Brynäs IF | SHL | 51 | 5 | 16 | 21 | 14 | 2 | 0 | 2 | 2 | 0 |
| 2022–23 | EC Red Bull Salzburg | ICEHL | 45 | 10 | 17 | 27 | 20 | 16 | 1 | 7 | 8 | 4 |
| 2023–24 | EC Red Bull Salzburg | ICEHL | 47 | 9 | 22 | 31 | 18 | 19 | 2 | 5 | 7 | 6 |
| NHL totals | | | 1 | 0 | 1 | 1 | 0 | — | — | — | — | — |
| KHL totals | | | 343 | 39 | 118 | 157 | 186 | 13 | 1 | 2 | 3 | 16 |
| SHL totals | | | 102 | 14 | 32 | 46 | 26 | 18 | 5 | 10 | 15 | 4 |

=== International ===
| Year | Team | Event | Result | GP | G | A | Pts | PIM |
|---|---|---|---|---|---|---|---|---|
| 2018 | Canada | OG | 3rd place, bronze medalist(s) | 6 | 0 | 1 | 1 | 4 |
| Senior totals | | | | 6 | 0 | 1 | 1 | 4 |

== Awards and honours ==
| Award | Year |
|---|---|
College
| WCHA Second All-Star Team | 2008 |
| WCHA All-Academic Team | 2009, 2011 |
| WCHA Defensive Player of the Year | 2009 |
| AHCA West Second-Team All-American | 2008–09 |
| WCHA First All-Star Team | 2009, 2011 |
| WHCA Third All-Star Team | 2010 |
| WHCA Outstanding Student-Athlete of the Year | 2011 |
| AHCA West First-Team All-American | 2010–11 |
| WCHA All-Tournament Team | 2011 |
CHL
| Champions (Frölunda HC) | 2019 |
SHL
| Le Mat Trophy (Frölunda HC) | 2019 |

Awards and achievements
| Preceded by Jack Hillen | WCHA Defensive Player of the Year; 2008–09 | Succeeded by Brendan Smith |
| Preceded by Eli Vlaisavljevich | WCHA Student-Athlete of the Year; 2010–11 | Succeeded by Brad Eidsness |
