= Pathrik Westerholm =

Swedish professional ice hockey player (born 1992)

- Born: 6 January 1992 (age 34) Karlskrona, Sweden
- Height: 5 ft 11 in (180 cm)
- Weight: 190 lb (86 kg; 13 st 8 lb)
- Position: Forward
- Shoots: Left
- Liiga team Former teams: Lukko; Brynäs IF; Frölunda HC; Malmö Redhawks
- NHL draft: 180th overall, 2011; Vancouver Canucks
- Playing career: 2010–present

Pathrik Westerholm (born 6 January 1992) is a Swedish professional ice hockey player. He is currently playing with Rauman Lukko in the Finnish Liiga. Westerholm was selected by the Vancouver Canucks in the 6th round (180th overall) of the 2011 NHL entry draft.

== Playing career ==
Westerholm made his Swedish Hockey League debut playing with Brynäs IF during the 2014–15 SHL season. Pathrik's twin brother Ponthus is also a professional hockey player.

On 3 May 2017, Westerholm left Brynäs alongside brother Ponthus, and signed a two-year contract with Frölunda HC.

After claiming the Swedish Championship in his final season under contract in 2018–19 season, Westerholm left as a free agent to move to the Finnish Liiga, again alongside Ponthus, agreeing to a one-year deal with Lukko on 8 May 2019.

== Awards and honours ==
Award	Year
CHL
Champions (Frölunda HC)	2019
SHL
Le Mat Trophy (Frölunda HC)	2019
