= Rhett Rakhshani =

American ice hockey player

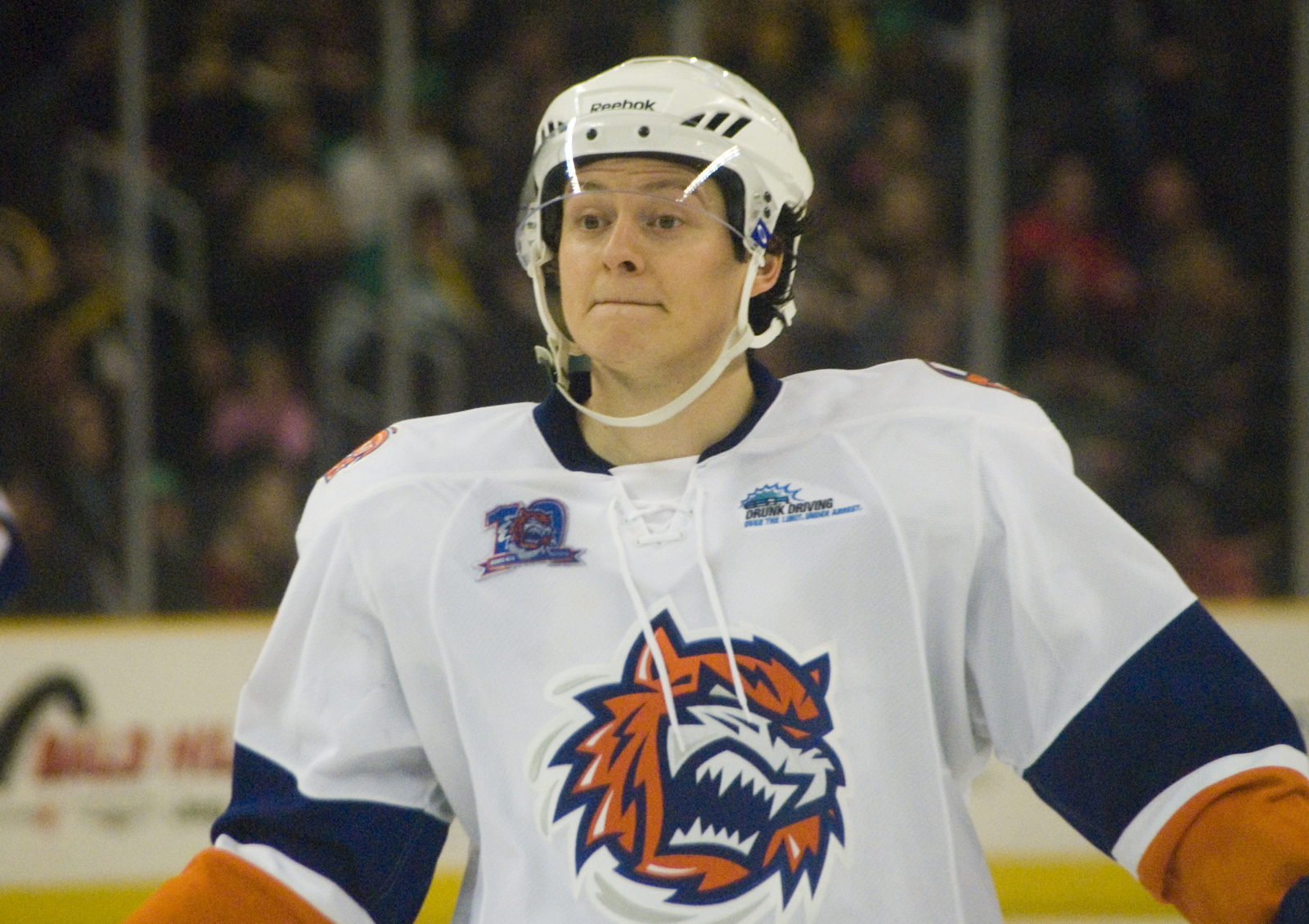
- Born: March 6, 1988 (age 38) Orange, California, U.S.
- Height: 5 ft 10 in (178 cm)
- Weight: 182 lb (83 kg; 13 st 0 lb)
- Position: Right wing
- Shot: Right
- Played for: New York Islanders; HV71; Växjö Lakers; Linköping HC; Malmö Redhawks; Frölunda HC; Djurgårdens IF; Grizzlys Wolfsburg
- NHL draft: 100th overall, 2006; New York Islanders
- Playing career: 2010–2022

Rhett Thomas Rakhshani (born March 6, 1988) is an American former professional ice hockey player. He was selected by the New York Islanders in the fourth round (100th overall) of the 2006 NHL entry draft. Rakhshani is of Iranian–German–Mexican–American descent. He announced his retirement on December 14, 2022, after his wife had been diagnosed with cancer.

== Playing career ==
As a youth, Rakhshani played in the 2002 Quebec International Pee-Wee Hockey Tournament with the California Wave minor ice hockey team.

Rakhshani played collegiately at the University of Denver between 2006 and 2010, and received All-America West First Team honors as a senior, before signing with the New York Islanders of the National Hockey League (NHL). He made his professional debut with the Islanders' affiliate, the Bridgeport Sound Tigers of the American Hockey League (AHL), in April 2010. He attended the 2010-11 AHL All-Star Classic and was named to the AHL All-Rookie Team the same season.

On December 13, 2010, Rakhshani suited up with the New York Islanders to make his NHL debut in an away game shutout loss against the Nashville Predators.

In 2012–13, he spent his first season abroad with HV71 of the Swedish Hockey League (SHL). After completing his first year in Sweden, he joined fellow SHL side Växjö Lakers, where he played from 2013 to 2015, helping win the 2014 Swedish championship. After spending the 2015-16 campaign with his third SHL team, Linköping HC, he signed to continue his SHL career with the Malmö Redhawks in June 2016. In 2018 Rakshani signed a three-year contract with the Gothenburg-based SHL team Frölunda Indians.

After 10 seasons in the SHL, Rakhshani left Sweden as a free agent and was signed to a one-year contract by the German club Grizzlys Wolfsburg of the Deutsche Eishockey Liga (DEL), on May 26, 2022. However, on December 14, he announced his retirement after his wife was diagnosed with cancer.

== Career statistics ==
=== Regular season and playoffs ===
			Regular season					Playoffs
Season	Team	League	GP	G	A	Pts	PIM	GP	G	A	Pts	PIM
2004–05	US NTDP Juniors	NAHL	40	12	15	27	21	9	1	4	5	2
2004–05	US NTDP U17	USDP	14	6	5	11	32	—	—	—	—	—
2005–06	US NTDP U18	USDP	43	11	12	23	30	—	—	—	—	—
2005–06	US NTDP U18	NAHL	16	13	13	26	35	—	—	—	—	—
2006–07	University of Denver	WCHA	40	10	26	36	38	—	—	—	—	—
2007–08	University of Denver	WCHA	37	14	14	28	52	—	—	—	—	—
2008–09	University of Denver	WCHA	38	15	22	37	50	—	—	—	—	—
2009–10	University of Denver	WCHA	41	21	29	50	40	—	—	—	—	—
2009–10	Bridgeport Sound Tigers	AHL	5	0	2	2	2	5	0	0	0	2
2010–11	New York Islanders	NHL	2	0	0	0	0	—	—	—	—	—
2010–11	Bridgeport Sound Tigers	AHL	66	24	38	62	32	—	—	—	—	—
2011–12	New York Islanders	NHL	5	0	0	0	2	—	—	—	—	—
2011–12	Bridgeport Sound Tigers	AHL	49	20	29	49	42	3	1	0	1	0
2012–13	HV71	SEL	52	14	25	39	46	5	1	4	5	4
2013–14	Växjö Lakers	SHL	55	13	25	38	26	12	3	6	9	12
2014–15	Växjö Lakers	SHL	51	6	12	18	37	18	8	4	12	8
2015–16	Linköping HC	SHL	33	14	15	29	14	5	0	1	1	2
2016–17	Malmö Redhawks	SHL	41	15	12	27	22	13	5	3	8	8
2017–18	Malmö Redhawks	SHL	37	9	22	31	24	10	2	4	6	10
2018–19	Frölunda HC	SHL	38	9	12	21	30	16	4	13	17	6
2019–20	Frölunda HC	SHL	36	10	15	25	57	—	—	—	—	—
2020–21	Djurgårdens IF	SHL	35	11	17	28	33	3	1	1	2	2
2021–22	Djurgårdens IF	SHL	50	11	15	26	14	—	—	—	—	—
2022–23	Grizzlys Wolfsburg	DEL	21	5	7	12	4	—	—	—	—	—
NHL totals			7	0	0	0	2	—	—	—	—	—
SHL totals			428	112	170	282	303	82	24	36	60	52

=== International ===
Year	Team	Event	Result	GP	G	A	Pts	PIM
2005	United States	U17	1st place, gold medalist(s)	5	3	1	4	2
2006	United States	WJC18	5th	6	5	1	6	4
2008	United States	WJC	4th	6	2	2	4	2
Junior totals				17	10	4	14	8

== Awards and honors ==
Award	Year
College
All-WCHA Third Team	2008–09
All-WCHA First Team	2009–10
AHCA West First-Team All-American	2009–10
AHL
All-Star Game	2011
All-Rookie Team	2011
CHL
Champions	2019
SHL
Le Mat Trophy champion	2015, 2019
