= Bobby Raymond =

Canadian ice hockey player (born 1985)

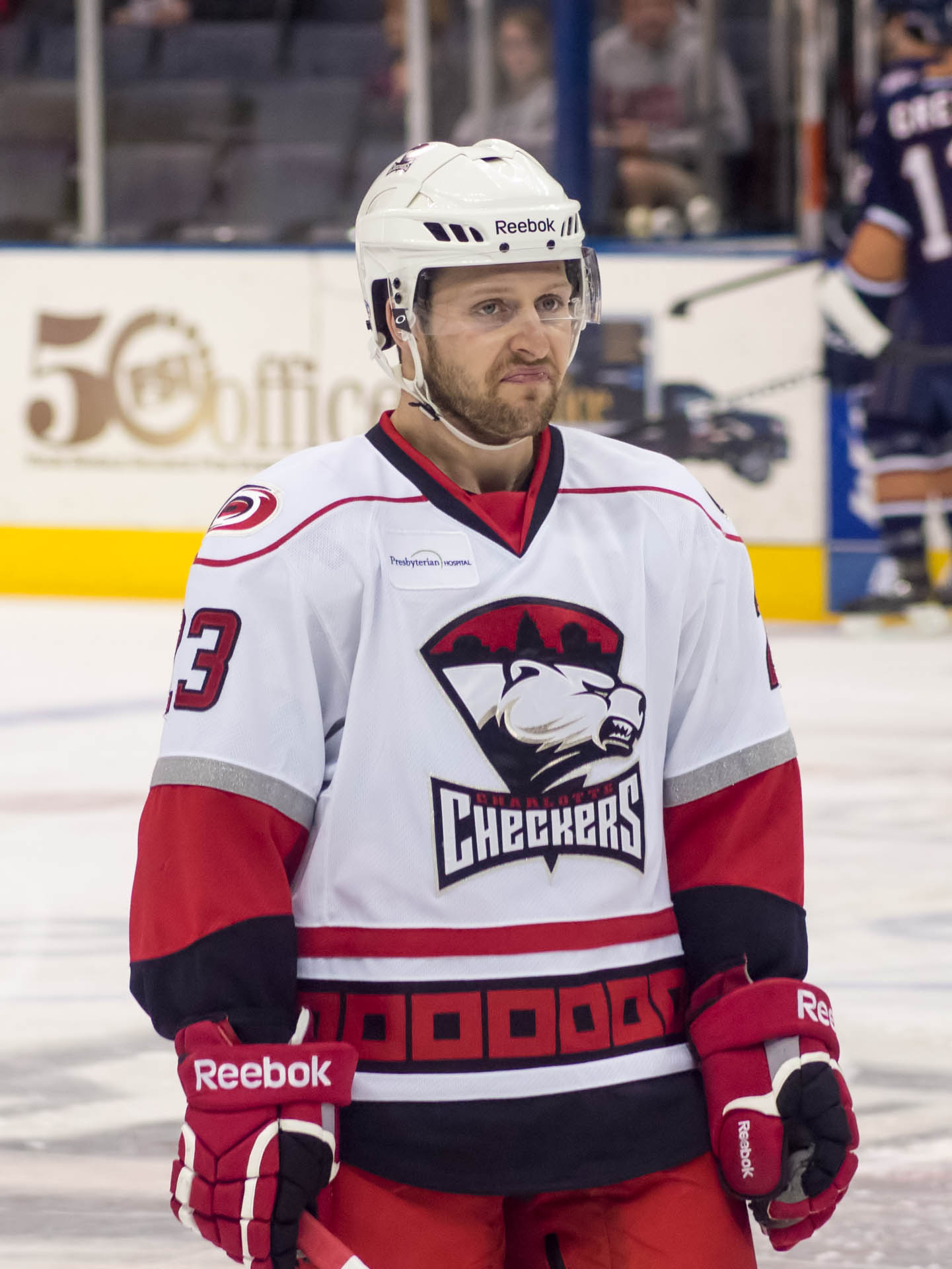
- Born: August 7, 1985 (age 40) Lucknow, Ontario, Canada
- Height: 5 ft 11 in (180 cm)
- Weight: 187 lb (85 kg; 13 st 5 lb)
- Position: Defence
- Shoots: Left
- Magnus team Former teams: Brûleurs de Loups; Strasbourg; Binghamton Senators; Charlotte Checkers; Iserlohn Roosters; Adler Mannheim; EC Red Bull Salzburg
- NHL draft: Undrafted
- Playing career: 2009–present

Robert Raymond (born August 7, 1985) is a Canadian professional ice hockey defenceman. He is currently playing for Gyergyói HK of the Erste Liga in Romania.

== Playing career ==
Raymond attended the Rochester Institute of Technology where he played four seasons of NCAA Division I college hockey with the RIT Tigers men's ice hockey team.

He played for the Charlotte Checkers of the American Hockey League (AHL) on loan from the Florida Everblades of the ECHL during the 2012–13 season.

On June 14, 2013, Raymond signed a one-year contract as a free agent abroad in Germany with the Iserlohn Roosters of the DEL. In the 2013–14 season with the Roosters, Raymond was a fixture on the blueline and compiled a productive 27 points in 52 games. After a post-season exit in the first round of the playoffs, Raymond announced signing a one-year contract with fellow DEL competitors, Adler Mannheim on April 4, 2014.

In his only season with Mannheim in 2014–15, Raymond suffered a dip in his offensive production from the blueline; however helped the club to win the 6th Championship in franchise history. On June 16, 2015, Raymond opted to return to the Iserlohn Roosters on a one-year contract. He enjoyed another productive season, with 27 points including 12 goals, tied for league lead for most goals by a defenseman.

After three seasons in Germany, Raymond left as a free agent to sign in the Neighboring Austrian EBEL with reigning Champions, EC Red Bull Salzburg, on a one-year deal on June 10, 2016.

On July 4, 2019, Raymond returned for his third stint in the DEL with Iserlohn, signing a two-year contract with the Roosters. Prior to the 2019–20 season, Raymond was announced as team captain. In June 2021, Raymond was signed by the Löwen Frankfurt from the DEL2. With the Löwen, he won the DEL2 championship in spring 2022, which was associated with promotion of the team to the DEL. Raymond was not re-signed, and he then moved to France to join the Brûleurs de Loups de Grenoble, where he helped the team win the Coupe de France. Raymond started the 2023/24 season without a club. He kept fit with a senior team in Canada until he was signed by Gyergyói HK from the First League in January 2024, with whom he reached the semifinals. He returned to Gyergyói HK for the start of the 2024/2025 season.

== Career statistics ==
			Regular season					Playoffs
Season	Team	League	GP	G	A	Pts	PIM	GP	G	A	Pts	PIM
2001–02	Burlington Cougars	OPJHL	42	2	11	13	8	—	—	—	—	—
2002–03	Burlington Cougars	OPJHL	15	1	5	6	4	—	—	—	—	—
2005–06	R.I.T.	NCAA	30	2	4	6	28	—	—	—	—	—
2006–07	R.I.T.	AHA	34	2	6	8	30	—	—	—	—	—
2007–08	R.I.T.	AHA	37	2	10	12	40	—	—	—	—	—
2008–09	R.I.T.	AHA	38	6	9	15	28	—	—	—	—	—
2009–10	Strasbourg	FRA	26	4	6	10	26	6	1	1	2	6
2010–11	Florida Everblades	ECHL	72	8	25	33	68	4	1	1	2	2
2010–11	Binghamton Senators	AHL	—	—	—	—	—	9	1	1	2	2
2011–12	Binghamton Senators	AHL	38	0	4	4	10	—	—	—	—	—
2011–12	Florida Everblades	ECHL	23	3	9	12	12	18	2	8	10	6
2012–13	Florida Everblades	ECHL	30	8	11	19	25	—	—	—	—	—
2012–13	Charlotte Checkers	AHL	44	4	14	18	16	5	2	2	4	2
2013–14	Iserlohn Roosters	DEL	52	7	20	27	32	9	1	3	4	0
2014–15	Adler Mannheim	DEL	48	2	11	13	14	15	2	2	4	2
2015–16	Iserlohn Roosters	DEL	51	12	15	27	70	6	1	1	2	0
2016–17	EC Red Bull Salzburg	EBEL	54	4	24	28	39	2	0	1	1	0
2017–18	EC Red Bull Salzburg	EBEL	54	10	21	31	52	19	2	5	7	6
2018–19	EC Red Bull Salzburg	EBEL	54	6	15	21	23	13	1	5	6	14
2019–20	Iserlohn Roosters	DEL	52	5	7	12	42	—	—	—	—	—
2020–21	Iserlohn Roosters	DEL	33	2	14	16	14	3	0	1	1	2
2021–22	Löwen Frankfurt	DEL2	51	5	23	28	21	0	0	0	0	0
AHL totals			82	4	18	22	26	14	3	3	6	4

== Awards and honours ==
Award	Year
College
All-Atlantic Hockey Third Team	2007–08
All-Atlantic Hockey Second Team	2008–09
ECHL
All-Rookie Team	2010–11
Kelly Cup (Florida Everblades)	2011–12
AHL
Calder Cup (Binghamton Senators)	2010–11
DEL
Champion (Adler Mannheim)	2014–15
