= Martin Dočekal =

Czech ice hockey player

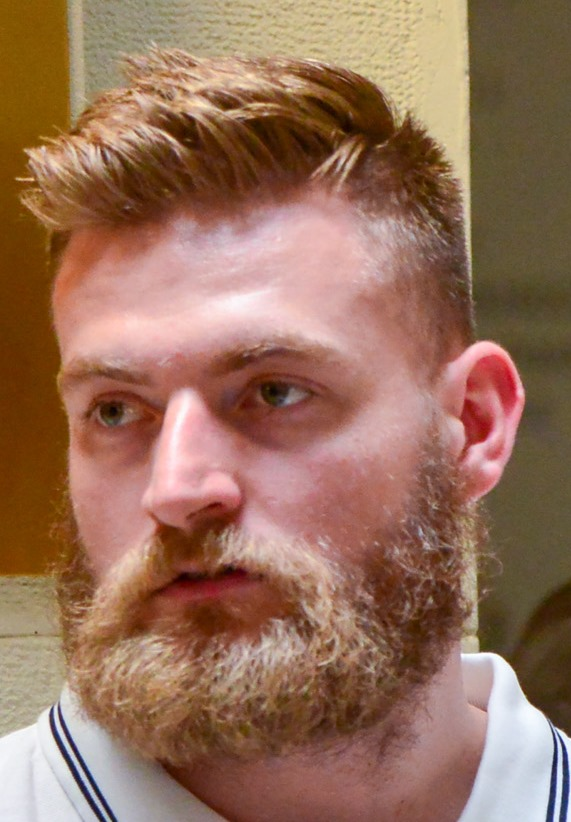
- Martin Dočekal (2018)
- Born: December 7, 1990 (age 34); Czechoslovakia
- Height: 6 ft 4 in (193 cm)
- Weight: 212 lb (96 kg; 15 st 2 lb)
- Position: Forward
- Shoots: Left
- Czech Extraliga team: HC Kometa Brno
- NHL draft: Undrafted
- Playing career: 2010–present

Martin Dočekal (born December 7, 1990) is a Czech professional ice hockey player. He currently plays with HC Kometa Brno in the Czech Extraliga.

Dočekal made his Czech Extraliga debut playing with HC Kometa Brno debut during the 2012–13 Czech Extraliga season.
