= Jan Eberle =

Czech professional ice hockey forward

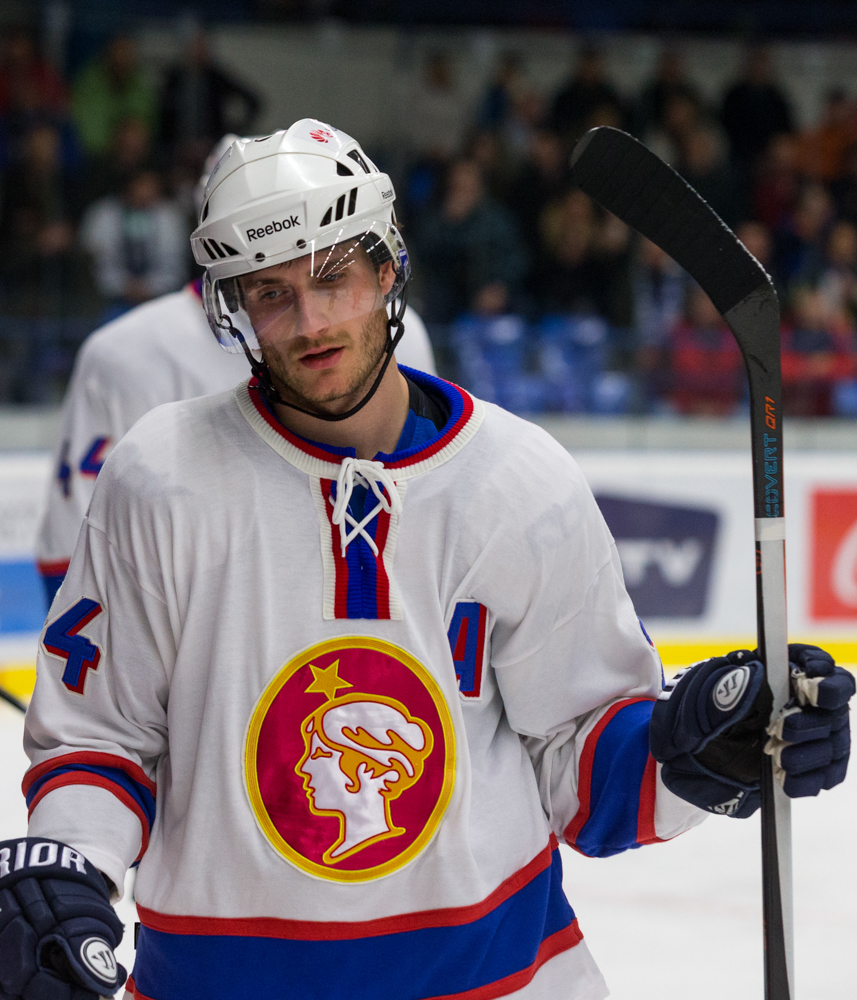
- Born: May 20, 1989 (age 35); Kladno, Czechoslovakia
- Height: 5 ft 11 in (180 cm)
- Weight: 172 lb (78 kg; 12 st 4 lb)
- Position: Forward
- Shoots: Left
- Czech Extraliga team: HC Plzeň
- Playing career: 2008–present

Jan Eberle (born May 20, 1989) is a Czech professional ice hockey forward who currently plays for HC Plzeň in the Czech Extraliga.
