= Tobias Ekberg =

Swedish ice hockey player

- Born: 13 January 1994 (age 32) Töreboda, Sweden
- Height: 5 ft 10 in (178 cm)
- Weight: 187 lb (85 kg; 13 st 5 lb)
- Position: Defense
- Shoots: Left
- Slovak team Former teams: HK Dukla Trenčín; Malmö Redhawks; Djurgårdens IF; Leksands IF; Linköping HC
- Playing career: 2014–present

Tobias Ekberg (born 13 January 1994) is a professional Swedish ice hockey player. He is currently playing for HK Dukla Trenčín of the Slovak Extraliga.

== Playing career ==
He was born in Töreboda, Sweden and represented the youth team Töreboda HF. Ekberg previously played for Malmö Redhawks and Djurgårdens IF. Ekberg left the club as at the conclusion of his two-year tenure with the Leksands IF on 21 March 2023.

== Career statistics ==
=== Regular season and playoffs ===
			Regular season					Playoffs
Season	Team	League	GP	G	A	Pts	PIM	GP	G	A	Pts	PIM
