= Jonathan Sigalet =

Canadian ice hockey player

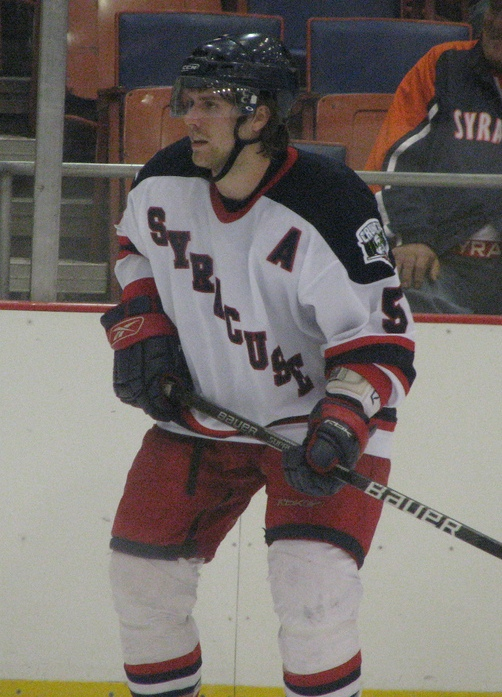
- Sigalet with the Syracuse Crunch in 2009
- Born: February 12, 1986 (age 40) Vancouver, British Columbia, Canada
- Height: 6 ft 1 in (185 cm)
- Weight: 203 lb (92 kg; 14 st 7 lb)
- Position: Defence
- Shot: Left
- SHL team Former teams: Brynäs IF; Boston Bruins; HC Lev Poprad; HC Slovan Bratislava; Luleå HF; Frölunda HC
- NHL draft: 100th overall, 2005; Boston Bruins
- Playing career: 2005–2021

Jonathan Patrick Sigalet (born February 12, 1986) is a Canadian professional ice hockey defenceman currently playing for Brynäs IF of the Swedish Hockey League (SHL). He was selected by the Boston Bruins in the fourth round (100th overall) of the 2005 NHL entry draft.

== Playing career ==
As a youth, Sigalet played in the 2000 Quebec International Pee-Wee Hockey Tournament with a minor ice hockey team from Burnaby.

=== Amateur ===
Sigalet's career began with the BCHL's Salmon Arm Silverbacks in 2002. During his season with the team, he received numerous awards, including being named to the BCHL First-Team All-Star and All-Rookie teams, as well as being named "Top Defenceman" by the team.

Following his season in the BCHL, Sigalet joined the Bowling Green Falcons for the 2003–2004 season, joining his brother, goaltender Jordan Sigalet. Following a three-point night against Findlay on December 12, Sigalet was named CCHA Rookie of the Week on December 14, 2003. He concluded his freshman season with 3 goals, 12 assists and 26 penalty minutes, earning him an Honorable Mention for the CCHA All-Rookie Team.

During his sophomore season, Sigalet recorded 3 goals, 13 assists and 36 penalty minutes. In March 2005 he was named to the CCHA Scholar-Athlete Team for a GPA of 3.87 in Health Science.

=== Professional ===
Sigalet was Boston's fourth pick (100th overall) in the 2005 NHL entry draft. He officially signed with the Boston Bruins on August 15, 2005, foregoing his final two years of college eligibility and joining his brother in Boston's system. Jonathan played three seasons with the Bruins' minor league team, the Providence Bruins.

In his rookie season with Providence, Jonathan was the team's leading scorer among defensemen with 9 goals and 27 assists. He added 2 more goals and another assist in the playoffs. Following the season he was awarded, along with David Lundbohm, Providence’s Community Service Award. He was also named the team's recipient of the American Specialty/AHL Man of the Year Award for 2005–2006, in honor of his community service efforts.

Jonathan played his first NHL game on January 9, 2007 with the Boston Bruins in a 5–2 loss against the Ottawa Senators. He registered one shot, no points, four penalty minutes and a minus-two plus/minus rating.

On May 28, 2008 the Columbus Blue Jackets acquired the rights to Sigalet in a trade with the Bruins in exchange for the rights of forward Matt Marquardt.

In the summer of 2011, he signed for Lev Poprad, the newest expansion team in the Kontinental Hockey League and the first team in that league based outside of the territory of the former Soviet Union.

In May 2012, he signed for Slovan Bratislava, which had recently completed the move from the Slovak Extraliga to the KHL to become one of the newest teams in the KHL.

After parts of two seasons in the Swedish Hockey League with Luleå HF, on April 29, 2016, Sigalet moved to fellow competitors, Frölunda HC, on a three-year contract.

== Career statistics ==
=== Regular season and playoffs ===
			Regular season					Playoffs
Season	Team	League	GP	G	A	Pts	PIM	GP	G	A	Pts	PIM
2002–03	Salmon Arm Silverbacks	BCHL	52	13	39	52	34	8	0	8	8	13
2003–04	Bowling Green Falcons	CCHA	37	3	12	15	26	2	0	0	0	0
2004–05	Bowling Green Falcons	CCHA	35	3	13	16	36	2	0	1	1	0
2005–06	Providence Bruins	AHL	75	9	27	36	59	6	2	1	2	9
2006–07	Providence Bruins	AHL	50	9	13	22	37	—	—	—	—	—
2006–07	Boston Bruins	NHL	1	0	0	0	4	—	—	—	—	—
2007–08	Providence Bruins	AHL	74	3	20	23	58	10	0	3	3	12
2008–09	Syracuse Crunch	AHL	19	5	6	11	16	—	—	—	—	—
2009–10	Syracuse Crunch	AHL	69	8	11	19	66	—	—	—	—	—
2010–11	Springfield Falcons	AHL	67	4	18	22	57	—	—	—	—	—
2011–12	HC Lev Poprad	KHL	49	1	7	8	30	—	—	—	—	—
2012–13	HC Slovan Bratislava	KHL	45	3	9	12	24	4	0	1	1	0
2013–14	HC Slovan Bratislava	KHL	52	1	9	10	30	—	—	—	—	—
2014–15	HC Slovan Bratislava	KHL	38	0	1	1	38	—	—	—	—	—
2014–15	Luleå HF	SHL	19	3	6	9	18	8	0	1	1	4
2015–16	Luleå HF	SHL	46	2	12	14	22	11	1	2	3	2
2016–17	Frölunda HC	SHL	45	3	8	11	43	14	1	2	3	10
2017–18	Frölunda HC	SHL	51	5	7	12	16	6	0	3	3	4
2018–19	Frölunda HC	SHL	45	7	9	16	20	16	1	3	4	33
2019–20	Brynäs IF	SHL	51	3	10	13	57	—	—	—	—	—
2020–21	Brynäs IF	SHL	14	1	5	6	10	—	—	—	—	—
2020–21	Frölunda HC	SHL	25	3	2	5	16	7	0	0	0	8
NHL totals			1	0	0	0	4	—	—	—	—	—
KHL totals			184	5	26	31	122	4	0	1	1	0
SHL totals			296	27	59	86	202	62	3	11	14	61

=== International ===
Year	Team	Event	Result	GP	G	A	Pts	PIM
2004	Canada	WJC18	4th	7	0	2	2	4
Junior totals				7	0	2	2	4

== Awards and honours ==
Award	Year
BCHL
All-Rookie Team	2003
First All-Star Team	2003
College
CCHA All-Rookie Team Honorable Mention	2004
CCHA All-Academic Team	2005
CHL
Champions (Frölunda HC)	2017, 2019
SHL
Le Mat Trophy (Frölunda HC)	2019
