= Dalimil Mikyska =

Czech ice hockey player

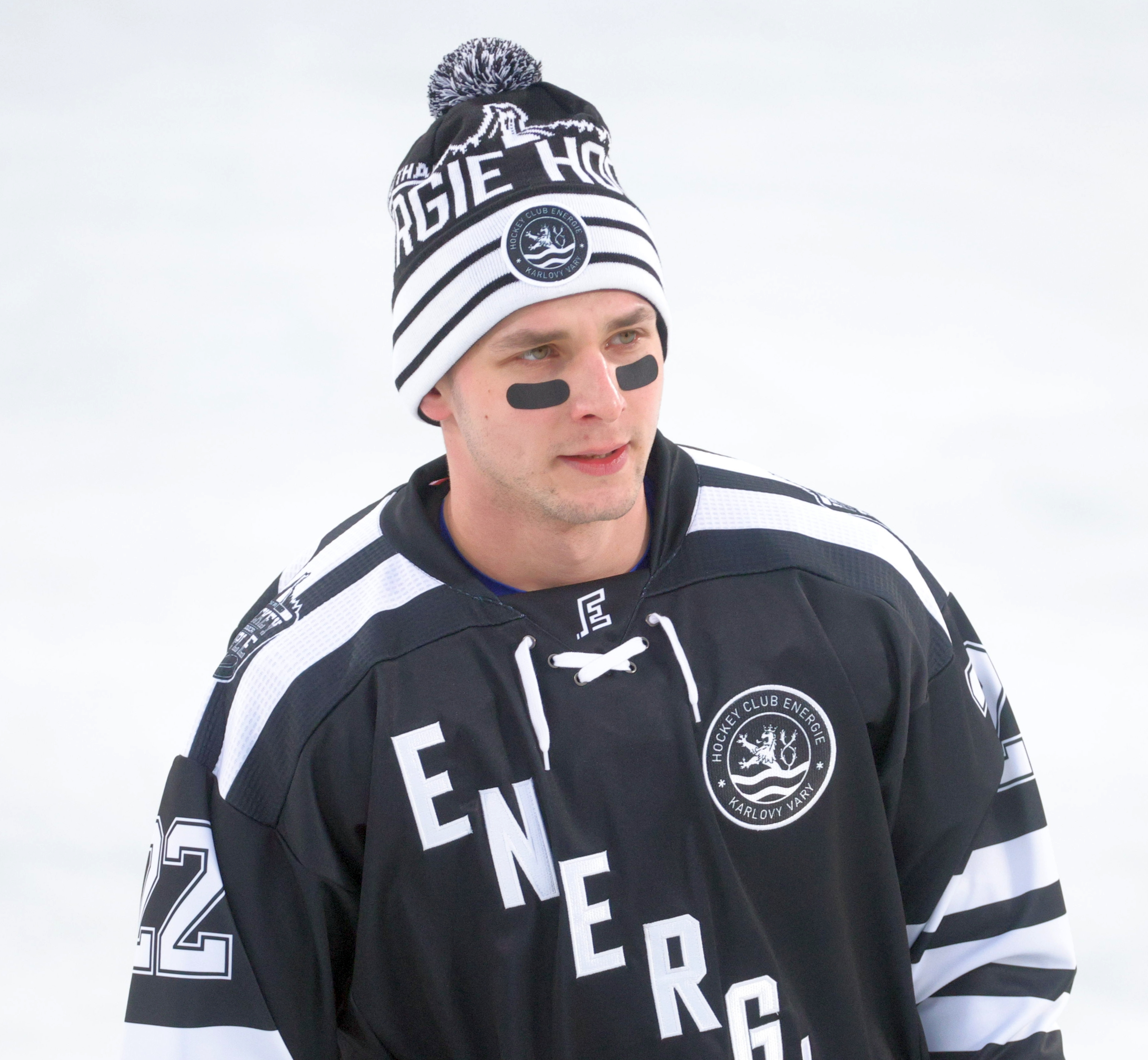
- Mikyska in 2024
- Born: 16 August 1999 (age 26) Břeclav, Czech Republic
- Height: 6 ft 1 in (185 cm)
- Weight: 205 lb (93 kg; 14 st 9 lb)
- Position: Defense
- Shoots: Left
- ELH team (P) Cur. team: HC Kometa Brno; HC Karlovy Vary (ELH)
- Playing career: 2015–present

Dalimil Mikyska (born 16 August 1999) is a Czech professional ice hockey player. He is plays for HC Karlovy Vary in the Czech Extraliga (ELH) on loan from HC Kometa Brno.

Mikyska made his Czech Extraliga debut playing with HC Kometa Brno during the 2015–16 Czech Extraliga season.

== Career statistics ==
=== Regular season and playoffs ===
			Regular season					Playoffs
Season	Team	League	GP	G	A	Pts	PIM	GP	G	A	Pts	PIM
2015–16	HC Kometa Brno	Czech.20	14	0	1	1	2	—	—	—	—	—
2015–16	HC Kometa Brno	ELH	1	0	0	0	0	—	—	—	—	—
2016–17	HC Kometa Brno	Czech.20	14	2	5	7	4	12	2	0	2	2
2016–17	HC Kometa Brno	ELH	4	0	0	0	0	—	—	—	—	—
2016–17	SK Horácká Slavia Třebíč	Czech.1	24	0	0	0	2	4	0	0	0	2
2017–18	HC Kometa Brno	Czech.20	6	0	6	6	0	7	1	1	2	0
2017–18	HC Kometa Brno	ELH	2	0	0	0	0	—	—	—	—	—
2017–18	SK Horácká Slavia Třebíč	Czech.1	31	3	2	5	10	—	—	—	—	—
2018–19	HC Kometa Brno	Czech.19	1	0	0	0	0	—	—	—	—	—
2018–19	HC Kometa Brno	ELH	8	0	0	0	2	—	—	—	—	—
2018–19	SK Horácká Slavia Třebíč	Czech.1	26	0	4	4	8	—	—	—	—	—
2019–20	HC Kometa Brno	ELH	3	0	0	0	2	—	—	—	—	—
2019–20	SK Horácká Slavia Třebíč	Czech.1	12	0	1	1	6	—	—	—	—	—
ELH totals			18	0	0	0	4	—	—	—	—	—

Medal record

Representing Czech Republic

Ice hockey

Ivan Hlinka Memorial Tournament
Gold medal – first place	2016 Czech Republic/Slovakia	

=== International ===
Year	Team	Event	Result	GP	G	A	Pts	PIM
2016	Czech Republic	U17	7th	5	0	0	0	2
2016	Czech Republic	IH18	1st place, gold medalist(s)	5	0	0	0	0
2017	Czech Republic	WJC18	7th	4	1	1	2	2
2019	Czech Republic	WJC	7th	5	0	0	0	0
Junior totals				19	1	1	2	4
