= Bedřich Köhler =

Czech ice hockey player

- Born: February 14, 1985 (age 41) Ostrava, Czechoslovakia
- Height: 6 ft 3 in (191 cm)
- Weight: 238 lb (108 kg; 17 st 0 lb)
- Position: Forward
- Shoots: Right
- Czech Extraliga team Former teams: HC Zlín; HC Vítkovice Steel; Mountfield HK; HC Kometa Brno
- Playing career: 2003–present

Bedřich Köhler (born February 14, 1985) is a Czech professional ice hockey player currently with HC Zlín in the Czech Extraliga.

He has previously played for HC Vítkovice Steel, Mountfield HK and HC Kometa Brno.
