= Emil Sylvegård =

Swedish ice hockey player

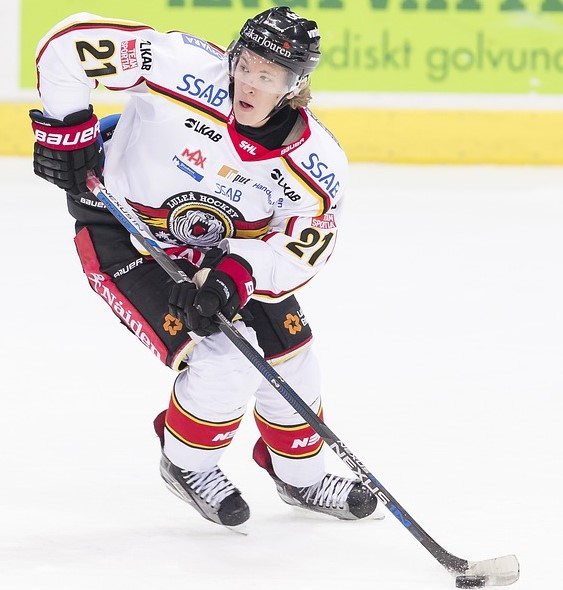
- Born: 2 March 1993 (age 32); Malmö, Sweden
- Height: 188 cm (6 ft 2 in)
- Weight: 98 kg (216 lb; 15 st 6 lb)
- Position: Forward
- Shoots: Left
- Liiga team Former teams: Tappara; Luleå HF; Linköpings HC; Malmö Redhawks; Växjö Lakers
- NHL draft: Undrafted
- Playing career: 2011–present

Emil Sylvegård (born 2 March 1993) is a Swedish professional ice hockey forward for Tappara of the Liiga.

== Playing career ==
Undrafted, Sylvegård made his professional Swedish Hockey League (SHL) debut playing with Luleå HF during the 2014–15 SHL season.

Following five seasons with the Malmö Redhawks, Sylvegård left as a free agent and was signed to a two-year contract with his fourth SHL club, Växjö Lakers, on 10 May 2023.

After 11 seasons in the SHL, Sylvegård opted to pursue a career in the neighbouring Finnish Liiga, signing a one-year contract with Tappara on 28 July 2025.
