= Miroslav Indrák =

Czech ice hockey player

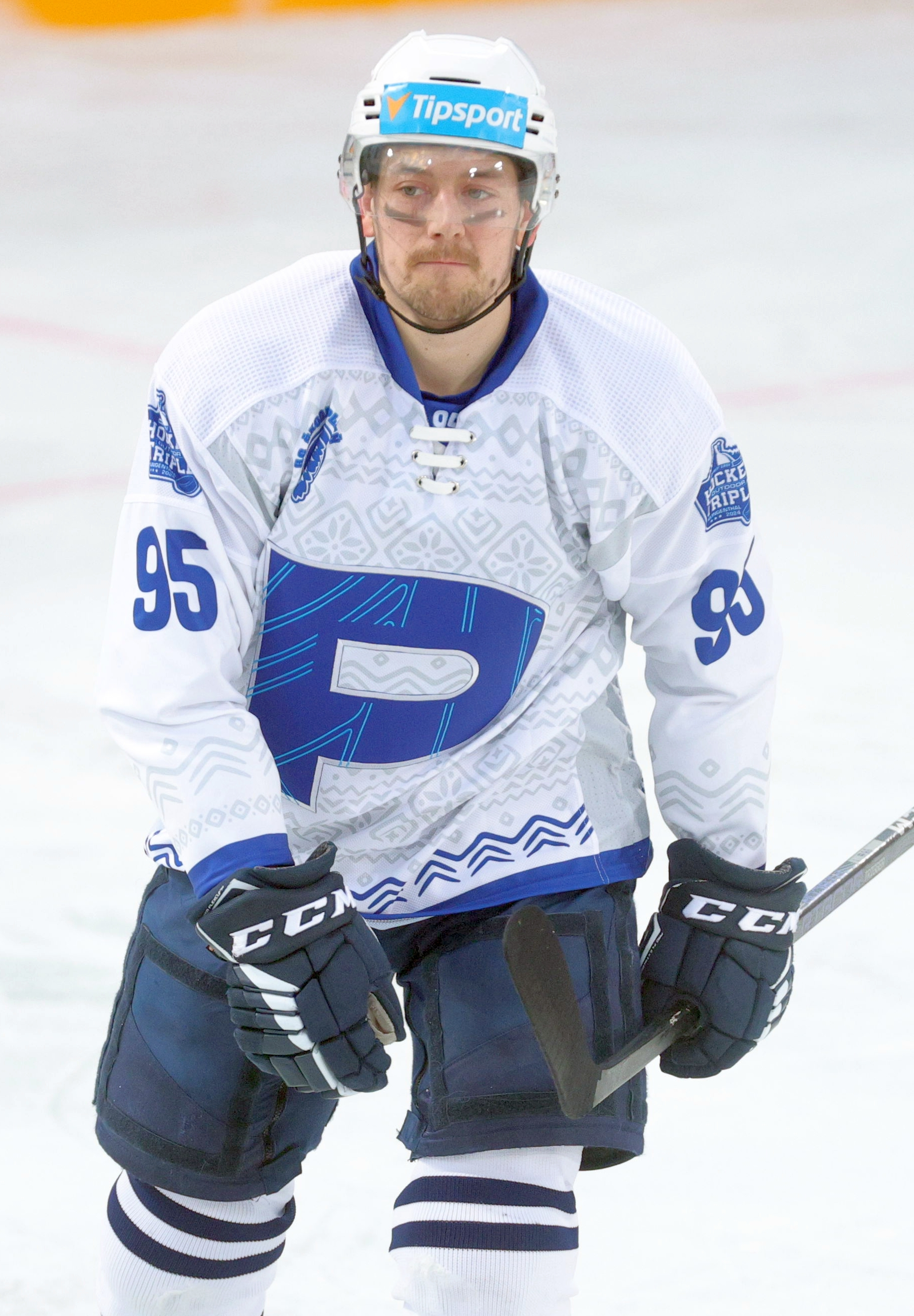
- Indrák in 2024
- Born: August 12, 1995 (age 29); Písek, Czech Republic
- Height: 5 ft 7 in (170 cm)
- Weight: 158 lb (72 kg; 11 st 4 lb)
- Position: Forward
- Shoots: Left
- Czech team: HC Plzeň
- Playing career: 2013–present

Miroslav Indrák (born August 12, 1995) is a Czech professional ice hockey player. He is currently playing for HC Plzeň of the Czech Extraliga.

Indrák made his Czech Extraliga debut playing with HC Plzeň during the 2013-14 Czech Extraliga season.
