= Leoš Čermák =

Czech ice hockey player

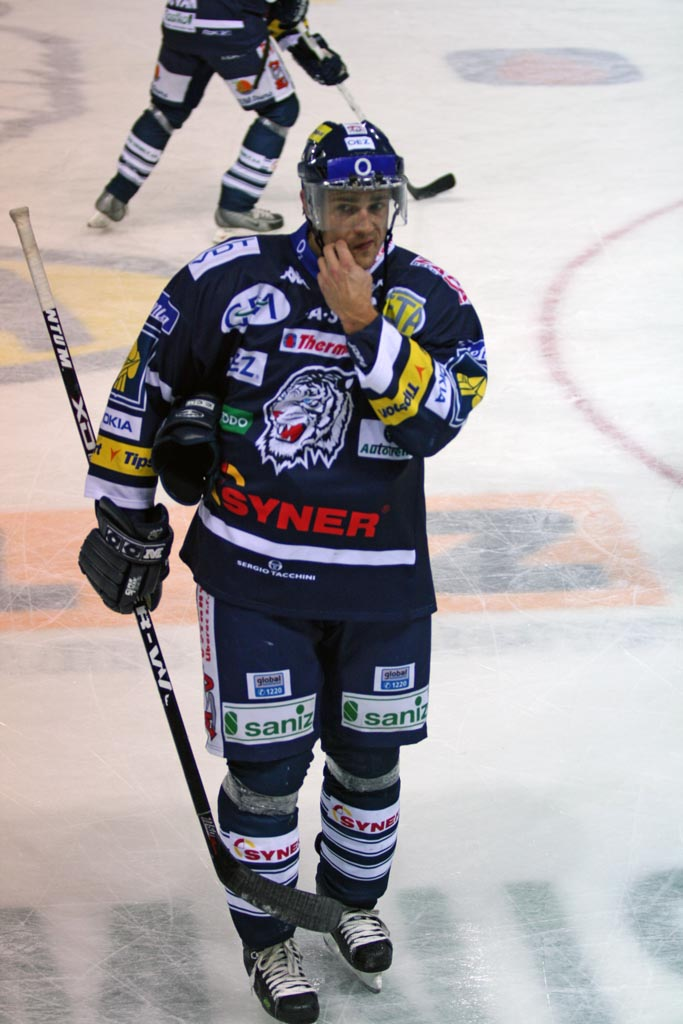
- Born: 13 March 1978 (age 47) Třebíč, Czechoslovakia
- Height: 6 ft 2 in (188 cm)
- Weight: 196 lb (89 kg; 14 st 0 lb)
- Position: Right wing
- Shot: Right
- Played for: Sibir Novosibirsk; Salavat Yulaev Ufa; HC Vítkovice; HC Slavia Prague; Torpedo Nizhny Novgorod
- NHL draft: Undrafted
- Playing career: 2000–2019

Leoš Čermák (born 13 March 1978 in Třebíč) is a Czech former professional ice hockey player.

Čermák began playing for HC Slavia Prague in the Czech Extraliga and then for HC Vítkovice before spending a season in the Russian Hockey League for Sibir Novosibirsk. He returned to the Czech Republic and split the next few years with Slavia Prague and HC Bílí Tygři Liberec. In 2008, Čermák returned to Russia and signed for Salavat Yulaev Ufa of the newly created KHL. He was released by the Ufa at the end of the 2008–09 season and signed a contract with Sibir Novosibirsk, where he started his career in Russia.

== Career statistics ==
			Regular season					Playoffs
Season	Team	League	GP	G	A	Pts	PIM	GP	G	A	Pts	PIM
1995–96	SK Horácká Slavia Třebíč U20	Czech U20	33	25	10	35	—	—	—	—	—	—
1997–98	SK Horácká Slavia Třebíč	Czech2	15	0	0	0	—	—	—	—	—	—
1998–99	SK Horácká Slavia Třebíč	Czech2	49	17	7	24	116	—	—	—	—	—
1999–00	SK Horácká Slavia Třebíč	Czech2	33	12	15	27	52	5	3	2	5	6
2000–01	HC Slavia Praha	Czech	47	11	13	24	40	11	2	1	3	49
2001–02	HC Slavia Praha	Czech	32	5	6	11	63	—	—	—	—	—
2001–02	HC Vitkovice	Czech	14	7	4	11	39	13	5	1	6	14
2002–03	HC Sibir Novosibirsk	Russia	47	11	9	20	101	—	—	—	—	—
2003–04	HC Slavia Praha	Czech	12	1	3	4	14	—	—	—	—	—
2003–04	Bílí Tygři Liberec	Czech	32	9	9	18	72	—	—	—	—	—
2004–05	Bílí Tygři Liberec	Czech	43	14	11	25	84	9	3	4	7	10
2005–06	Bílí Tygři Liberec	Czech	29	6	9	15	56	5	0	0	0	8
2005–06	SK Horácká Slavia Třebíč	Czech2	2	2	0	2	0	—	—	—	—	—
2006–07	HC Slavia Praha	Czech	22	7	7	14	34	—	—	—	—	—
2006–07	Bílí Tygři Liberec	Czech	24	8	7	15	48	8	1	2	3	12
2007–08	Bílí Tygři Liberec	Czech	40	20	9	29	85	11	7	4	11	12
2008–09	Salavat Yulaev Ufa	KHL	43	9	9	18	89	3	0	0	0	0
2009–10	HC Sibir Novosibirsk	KHL	51	13	14	27	118	—	—	—	—	—
2010–11	Torpedo Nizhny Novgorod	KHL	39	3	7	10	54	—	—	—	—	—
2011–12	HC Kometa Brno	Czech	52	18	15	33	84	20	5	10	15	50
2012–13	HC Kometa Brno	Czech	49	9	19	28	88	—	—	—	—	—
2013–14	HC Kometa Brno	Czech	43	5	18	23	74	18	1	3	4	18
2014–15	HC Kometa Brno	Czech	48	9	8	17	114	12	2	4	6	20
2015–16	HC Kometa Brno	Czech	40	10	7	17	64	4	2	0	2	20
2016–17	HC Kometa Brno	Czech	50	11	12	23	83	12	0	2	2	10
2017–18	HC Kometa Brno	Czech	44	6	4	10	22	14	1	5	6	22
2018–19	HC Kometa Brno	Czech	50	8	8	16	66	10	0	0	0	8
KHL totals			133	25	30	55	261	3	0	0	0	0
Czech totals			671	164	169	333	1,130	152	31	37	68	263
