= Nicklas Lasu =

Swedish ice hockey player (born 1989)

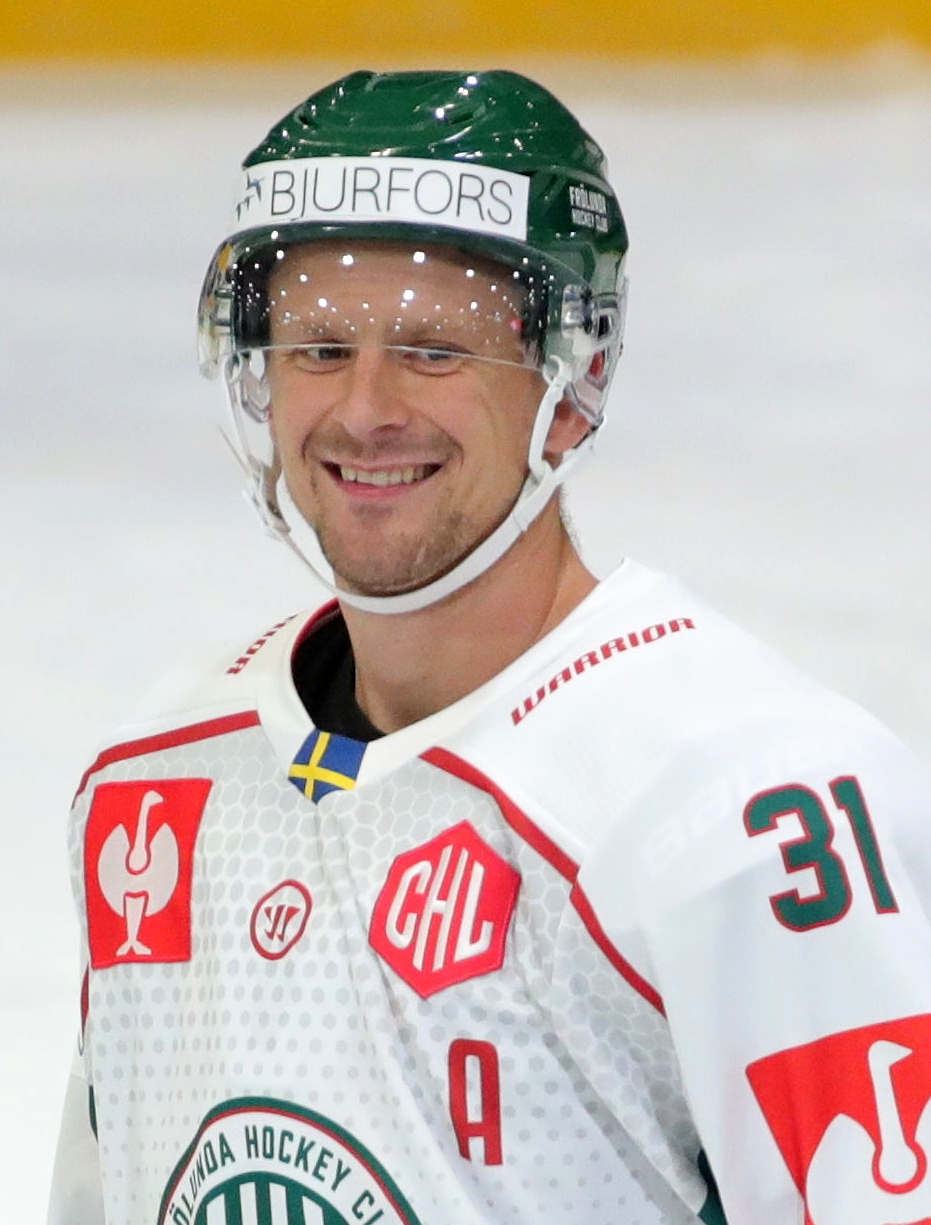
- Born: 16 September 1989 (age 37) Mölndal, Sweden
- Height: 182 cm (6 ft 0 in)
- Weight: 80 kg (176 lb; 12 st 8 lb)
- Position: Forward
- Shoots: Left
- SHL team Former teams: Frölunda HC; Oulun Kärpät
- NHL draft: 124th overall, 2008; Atlanta Thrashers
- Playing career: 2007–present

Nicklas Tyrone Lasu (born 16 September 1989) is a Swedish professional ice hockey player who is a forward for Frölunda HC in Swedish Hockey League (SHL). He formerly played with Oulun Kärpät in the Liiga.

== Playing career ==
Lasu was selected by the Atlanta Thrashers in the fifth round of the 2008 NHL entry draft, and was part of the Swedish team at the 2009 World Junior Championship in Ottawa, Canada.

A player known to lead by example, he is regarded by his skills in blocking shots and by the fact he plays all three forward positions.

After two successful seasons with Kärpät, Lasu left after the 2018–19 campaign, opting to return home to Sweden signing a four-year contract with original club, Frölunda HC, on 10 May 2019.

== Personal life ==
Lasu is a cousin of former Frölunda HC player Magnus Kahnberg. His father is Tyrone Lasu.

== Career statistics ==
Medal record

Men's ice hockey

Representing Sweden

World Junior Championships
Silver medal – second place	2009 Ottawa	

=== Regular season and playoffs ===
			Regular season					Playoffs
Season	Team	League	GP	G	A	Pts	PIM	GP	G	A	Pts	PIM
2006–07	Frölunda HC	J20	39	11	14	25	30	7	0	0	0	4
2007–08	Frölunda HC	J20	41	19	34	53	42	8	5	5	10	4
2007–08	Frölunda HC	SEL	2	0	0	0	0	—	—	—	—	—
2008–09	Borås HC	Allsv	21	4	6	10	35	—	—	—	—	—
2008–09	Frölunda HC	SEL	14	3	1	4	4	11	0	1	1	8
2009–10	Borås HC	Allsv	8	5	2	7	2	—	—	—	—	—
2009–10	Frölunda HC	SEL	51	2	7	9	10	7	0	1	1	2
2010–11	Frölunda HC	SEL	54	7	6	13	24	—	—	—	—	—
2011–12	Frölunda HC	SEL	45	4	5	9	39	6	0	1	1	25
2012–13	Frölunda HC	SEL	54	2	7	9	18	6	0	0	0	2
2013–14	Frölunda HC	SHL	50	3	13	16	26	7	2	2	4	2
2014–15	Frölunda HC	SHL	55	5	9	14	34	8	0	0	0	4
2015–16	Frölunda HC	SHL	51	8	13	21	30	15	4	2	6	8
2016–17	Frölunda HC	SHL	48	6	8	14	28	14	2	4	6	4
2017–18	Oulun Kärpät	Liiga	60	10	19	29	30	18	0	4	4	10
2018–19	Oulun Kärpät	Liiga	58	10	27	37	30	17	2	6	8	16
2019–20	Frölunda HC	SHL	51	11	8	19	80	—	—	—	—	—
2020–21	Frölunda HC	SHL	51	5	15	20	32	7	1	0	1	4
2021–22	Frölunda HC	SHL	46	5	5	10	53	9	2	0	2	8
2022–23	Frölunda HC	SHL	49	10	7	17	55	11	0	2	2	6
2023–24	Frölunda HC	SHL	52	8	14	22	45	14	1	3	4	6
2024–25	Frölunda HC	SHL	50	4	7	11	16	12	1	2	3	75
2025–26	Frölunda HC	SHL	50	7	2	19	22	6	1	0	1	2
SHL totals			773	90	137	227	516	133	14	18	32	156
Liiga totals			118	20	46	66	60	35	2	10	12	26

=== International ===
Year	Team	Event	Result	GP	G	A	Pts	PIM
2009	Sweden	WJC	2nd place, silver medalist(s)	6	2	0	2	2
Junior totals				6	2	0	2	2

== Awards and honors ==
Award	Year	Ref
SHL
Le Mat Trophy champion	2016	
CHL
Champions	2016, 2017	
Liiga
Kanada-malja champion	2018	
Matti Keinonen trophy	2019	
