= 2014–15 Frölunda HC season =

Swedish ice hockey club season

2014–15 Frölunda HC
- League: 2nd SHL
- 2014–15 record: 23–15–17
- Home record: 14–4–9 (5th)
- Road record: 9–11–8 (2nd)
- Goals for: 145
- Goals against: 120

Team information
- General manager: Christian Lechtaler
- Coach: Roger Rönnberg
- Assistant coach: Robert Ohlsson; Klas Östman
- Captain: Joel Lundqvist
- Alternate captains: Christian Bäckman; Mathis Olimb
- Arena: Scandinavium
- Average attendance: 9,087

Team leaders
- Goals: Andreas Johnson (22)
- Assists: Mathis Olimb (39)
- Points: Mathis Olimb (46)
- Penalty minutes: Mathis Olimb (65)

The 2014–15 season will be Frölunda HC's 35th season in Sweden's premier ice hockey league, the Swedish Hockey League (SHL; formerly named Elitserien).

== Pre-season ==
=== Exhibition games log ===
Exhibition games log; 5–2–1 (Home: 3–0–1; Away: 2–2–0)

August; 4–1–1 (Home: 2–0–1; Away: 1–0–0)
Round	Date	Opponent	Score	Goaltender	Venue	Attendance
EG	August 8	Växjö Lakers	0–2	Fernström	Varbergs Ishall	N/A
EG	August 14	Leksands IF	5–3	Johansson	Frölundaborg	1,952
EG	August 15	Rögle BK	2–0	Bergvik	Lindab Arena	2,225
EG	August 30	Vålerenga IF	5–1	Johansson	Frölundaborg	622
EG	August 31	HC Lugano	3–1	Fernström	Frölundaborg	1,595

Legend: Win Overtime/Shootout win (2 points) Loss (0 points) Overtime/Shootout loss (1 point)

== Champions Hockey League ==
=== Games log ===
2014–15 CHL games log; 5–1–0 (Home: 3–0–0; Away: 2–1–0)

Group stage: 5–1–0 (Home: 3–0–0; Away: 2–1–0)
Round	Date	Opponent	Score	Decision	Venue	Attendance	Record	Pts
1	August 21	Genève-Servette HC	3–4	Johansson	Patinoire des Vernets	5,044	0–1–0	0
2	August 23	Diables Rouges de Briançon	7–1	Fernström	Patinoire René Froger	N/A	1–1–0	3
3	September 4	Genève-Servette HC	7–3	Fernström	Scandinavium	N/A	2–1–0	6
4	September 7	EC Villacher SV	5–2	Johansson	Scandinavium	4,880	3–1–0	9
5	September 24	Diables Rouges de Briançon	6–2	Johansson	Scandinavium	1,391	4–1–0	12
6	October 7	EC Villacher SV	7–1	Johansson	Stadthalle	2,150	5–1–0	15

1/8 Finals: 2–0 (Home: 1–0; Away: 1–0)
Round	Date	Opponent	Score	Decision	Venue	Attendance	Record
7	November 4	Tappara	5–1	Fernström	Hakametsä	2,546	1–0
8	November 11	Tappara	4–2	Johansson	Scandinavium	4,770	2–0

Quarter finals: 0–0 (Home: 0–0; Away: 0–0)
Round	Date	Opponent	Score	Decision	Venue	Attendance	Record
9	TBD	HIFK	–		TBD
10	TBD	HIFK	–		Frölundaborg

Legend: Win Overtime/Shootout win (2 points) Loss (0 points) Overtime/Shootout loss (1 point)

== Swedish Hockey League ==
=== Standings ===
Final standings
Team	Pld	W	OTW	OTL	L	GF	GA	GD	Pts	Qualification
Skellefteå AIK	55	32	5	5	13	169	116	+53	111	Advanced directly to the playoffs
Frölunda HC	55	23	11	6	15	145	120	+25	97	Advanced directly to the playoffs
Växjö Lakers	55	24	9	6	16	158	120	+38	96	Advanced directly to the playoffs
Linköpings HC	55	26	4	7	18	156	125	+31	93	Advanced directly to the playoffs
HV71	55	25	6	5	19	145	141	+4	92	Advanced directly to the playoffs
Örebro HK	55	21	10	7	17	156	128	+28	90	Advanced directly to the playoffs
Färjestad BK	55	21	6	8	20	128	135	−7	83	Play-in for the playoffs
Luleå HF	55	21	6	4	24	127	131	−4	79	Play-in for the playoffs
Djurgårdens IF	55	15	9	8	23	128	157	−29	71	Play-in for the playoffs
Brynäs IF	55	19	3	5	28	132	159	−27	68	Play-in for the playoffs

=== Games log ===
2014–15 SHL games log; 10–3–10 (Home: 5–1–6; Away: 5–2–4)

September: 3–1–2 (Home: 3–0–0; Away: 0–1–2)
Round	Date	Opponent	Score	Decision	Venue	Attendance	Record	Pts
1	September 11	Brynäs IF	4–0	Fernström	Scandinavium	9,566	1–0–0	3
2	September 13	Örebro HK	2–1 (OT)	Fernström	Behrn Arena	5,200	1–0–1	5
3	September 18	HV71	0–5	Fernström	Kinnarps Arena	6,568	1–1–1	5
4	September 20	Djurgårdens IF	2–1	Fernström	Scandinavium	8,618	2–1–1	8
5	September 26	Modo Hockey	3–2	Johansson	Scandinavium	7,495	3–1–1	11
6	September 27	Färjestads BK	2–3 (SO)	Fernström	Löfbergs Arena	6,639	3–1–2	12

October: 4–1–6 (Home: 1–1–4; Away: 3–0–2)
Round	Date	Opponent	Score	Decision	Venue	Attendance	Record	Pts
7	October 1	Luleå HF	3–2 PS	Fernström	COOP Norrbotten Arena	4,642	3–1–3	14
8	October 4	Skellefteå AIK	2–3 PS	Fernström	Scandinavium	10,034	3–1–4	15
9	October 9	Växjö Lakers	2–1	Johansson	Vida Arena	4,548	4–1–4	18
10	October 11	Linköping HC	4–1	Fernström	Scandinavium	7,934	5–1–4	21
11	October 16	Leksands IF	2–1	Johansson	Tegera Arena	5,229	6–1–4	24
12	October 18	Luleå HF	2–1 (OT)	Fernström	Scandinavium	8,814	6–1–5	26
13	October 22	Djurgårdens IF	6–0	Fernström	Hovet	6,512	7–1–5	29
14	October 24	Örebro HK	1–4	Johansson	Scandinavium	8,196	7–2–5	29
15	October 25	Modo Hockey	4–3 (OT)	Fernström	Fjällräven Center	6,213	7–2–6	31
16	October 28	Färjestad BK	2–3 (SO)	Johansson	Scandinavium	11,035	7–2–7	32
17	October 30	Växjö Lakers	3–2 (SO)	Fernström	Scandinavium	10,819	7–2–8	34

November: 4–2–3 (Home: 2–0–2; Away: 2–2–1)
Round	Date	Opponent	Score	Decision	Venue	Attendance	Record	Pts
18	November 1	Skellefteå AIK	3–1	Johansson	Skellefteå Kraft Arena	5,517	8–2–8	37
19	November 13	Leksands IF	3–1	Fernström	Scandinavium	9,335	9–2–8	40
20	November 15	Brynäs IF	0–3	Johansson	Gavlerinken Arena	5,048	9–3–8	40
21	November 18	Linköping HC	3–2	Fernström	Saab Arena	5,059	10–3–8	43
22	November 20	HV71	4–3 (SO)	Johansson	Scandinavium	9,942	10–3–9	45
23	November 22	Djurgårdens IF	5–4 (SO)	Fernström	Scandinavium	10,678	10–3–10	47
24	November 25	Växjö Lakers	2–1 (OT)	Johansson	Vida Arena	5,002	10–3–11	49
25	November 27	Brynäs IF	6–1	Fernström	Scandinavium	8,929	11–3–11	52
26	November 29	HV71	1–3	Johansson	Kinnarps Arena	7,000	11–4–11	52

December: 1–4–2 (Home: 1–1–1; Away: 0–3–1)
Round	Date	Opponent	Score	Decision	Venue	Attendance	Record	Pts
27	December 4	Luleå HF	0–1	Johansson	COOP Norrbotten Arena	4,563	11–5–11	52
28	December 6	Skellefteå AIK	1–2	Fernström	Frölundaborg	5,517	11–6–11	52
29	December 11	Örebro HK	3–6	Fernström	Behrn Arena	5,133	11–7–11	52
30	December 13	Leksands IF	1–2 (OT)	Fernström	Tegera Arena	6,705	11–7–12	53
31	December 26	Linköping HC	2–3 (OT)	Fernström	Scandinavium	9,145	11–7–13	54
32	December 28	Färjestads BK	2–6	Johansson	Löfbergs Arena	8,011	11–8–13	54
33	December 30	Modo Hockey	2–0	Fernström	Scandinavium	10,330	12–8–13	57

January: 6–4–0 (Home: 4–2–0; Away: 2–2–0)
Round	Date	Opponent	Score	Decision	Venue	Attendance	Record	Pts
34	January 3	Leksands IF	2–1	Fernström	Scandinavium	10,741	13–8–13	60
35	January 6	Djurgårdens IF	0–2	Fernström	Hovet	6,751	13–9–13	60
36	January 8	Örebro HK	1–4	Fernström	Scandinavium	6,552	13–10–13	60
38	January 16	Skellefteå AIK	3–2	Johansson	Skellefteå Kraft Arena	5068	14–10–13	63
39	January 17	Linköping HC	3–2	Fernström	Saab Arena	5,452	15–10–13	66
40	January 22	Luleå HF	4–1	Fernström	Scandinavium	9,283	16–10–13	69
41	January 24	Växjö Lakers	2–3	Johansson	Scandinavium	9,896	16–11–13	69
42	January 28	Modo Hockey	4–3	Fernström	Scandinavium	6,356	17–11–13	72
43	January 30	Färjestads BK	2–0	Johansson	Scandinavium	10,653	18–11–13	75
44	January 31	Brynäs IF	2–4	Fernström	Gavlerinken Arena	5476	18–12–13	75

February: 4–2–4 (Home: 2–0–2; Away: 2–2–2)
Round	Date	Opponent	Score	Decision	Venue	Attendance	Record	Pts
37	February 9	HV71	5–0	Johansson	Scandinavium	7,763	19–12–13	78
45	February 10	HV71	4–1	Johansson	Kinnarps Arena	6,903	20–12–13	81
46	February 12	Djurgårdens IF	3–4 (SO)	Johansson	Scandinavium	7,447	20–12–14	82
47	February 14	Brynäs IF	4–0	Fernström	Scandinavium	11,698	21–12–14	85
48	February 17	Växjö Lakers	0–3	Johansson	Vida Arena	5,243	21–13–14	85
49	February 19	Skellefteå AIK	4–3 (OT)	Johansson	Scandinavium	9,325	21–13–15	87
50	February 21	Örebro HK	2–4	Fernström	Behrn Arena	5,200	21–14–15	87
51	February 24	Färjestads BK	4–3 (SO)	Johansson	Löfbergs Arena	6,033	21–14–16	89
52	February 26	Modo Hockey	6–1	Johansson	Fjällräven Center	7,350	22–14–16	92
53	February 28	Leksands IF	5–4 (SO)	Fernström	Tegera Arena	5,660	22–14–17	94

March: 1–1–0 (Home: 1–0–0; Away: 0–1–0)
Round	Date	Opponent	Score	Decision	Venue	Attendance	Record	Pts
54	March 3	Linköping HC	3–0	Johansson	Scandinavium	9,256	23–14–17	97
55	March 5	Luleå HF	0–3	Johansson	COOP Norrbotten Arena	4,534	23–15–17	97

Legend: Win Overtime/Shootout win (2 points) Loss (0 points) Overtime/Shootout loss (1 point)

== Statistics ==
=== Skaters ===
Name	Pos	Nationality	GP	G	A	P	PIM	GP	G	A	P	PIM
Name	Pos	Nationality	Regular season					Playoffs				
Mathis Olimb	C	Norway	51	7	39	46	65	—	—	—	—	—
Mattias Janmark-Nylén	C	Sweden	55	13	23	36	30	—	—	—	—	—
Andreas Johnson	LW	Sweden	55	22	13	35	34	—	—	—	—	—
Robin Figren	RW	Sweden	49	16	15	31	26	—	—	—	—	—
Erik Gustafsson	D	Sweden	55	4	25	29	22	—	—	—	—	—
Max Görtz	RW	Sweden	53	14	14	28	6	—	—	—	—	—
Elias Fälth	D	Sweden	50	8	16	24	32	—	—	—	—	—
Joel Lundqvist	C	Sweden	55	5	17	22	18	—	—	—	—	—
Mikael Wikstrand	D	Sweden	46	5	15	20	10	—	—	—	—	—
Artturi Lekhonen	LW	Finland	47	8	8	16	12	—	—	—	—	—
Mats Rosseli Olsen	LW	Norway	40	7	8	15	35	—	—	—	—	—
Ryan Lasch	RW	USA	12	6	8	14	2	—	—	—	—	—
Nicklas Lasu	LW	Sweden	55	5	9	14	34	—	—	—	—	—
Christoffer Persson	D	Sweden	51	3	8	11	52	—	—	—	—	—
Oscar Fantenberg	D	Sweden	50	2	7	9	38	—	—	—	—	—
Christian Bäckman	D	Sweden	33	4	3	7	16	—	—	—	—	—
Oliver Bohm	D	Sweden	46	3	4	7	24	—	—	—	—	—
Anton Blidh	LW	Sweden	48	5	0	5	26	—	—	—	—	—
Magnus Kahnberg	RW	Sweden	26	1	4	5	10	—	—	—	—	—
Jacob Larsson	D	Sweden	20	1	2	3	6	—	—	—	—	—
Erik Karlsson	RW	Sweden	53	1	2	3	6	—	—	—	—	—
Anton Axelsson	LW	Sweden	38	2	0	2	6	—	—	—	—	—
Pontus Widerström	C	Sweden	44	2	0	2	12	—	—	—	—	—
Luke Moffatt	RW	USA	10	0	2	2	0	—	—	—	—	—
Sebastian Stålberg	RW	Sweden	3	1	0	1	0	—	—	—	—	—
Anton Karlsson	LW	Sweden	9	0	1	1	2	—	—	—	—	—
Emil Djuse	D	Sweden	14	0	1	1	0	—	—	—	—	—
John Nyberg	D	Sweden	17	0	1	1	2	—	—	—	—	—
Linus Fernström	G	Sweden	51	0	1	1	2	—	—	—	—	—
Oscar Engsund	D	Sweden	1	0	0	0	0	—	—	—	—	—
Hugo Fagerblom	G	Sweden	1	0	0	0	0	—	—	—	—	—
Nils Lagerlöf	D	Sweden	1	0	0	0	0	—	—	—	—	—
Jakob Olsson	LW	Sweden	1	0	0	0	0	—	—	—	—	—
Kim Roussakoff	D	Sweden	1	0	0	0	0	—	—	—	—	—
John Dahlström	LW	Sweden	2	0	0	0	0	—	—	—	—	—
Pierre Engvall	LW	Sweden	2	0	0	0	0	—	—	—	—	—
Fredrik Bergvik	G	Sweden	4	0	0	0	0	—	—	—	—	—
Christoffer Ehn	C	Sweden	6	0	0	0	2	—	—	—	—	—
Lars Johansson	G	Sweden	54	0	0	0	2	—	—	—	—	—

== Transactions ==
Acquired
Player	Former team	Date	Notes
Artturi Lehkonen	KalPa	March 28	
Elias Fälth	HV71	March 31	
Oscar Fantenberg	HV71	April 3	
Sebastian Stålberg	Portland Pirates	May 14	
Mattias Janmark	AIK IF	June 3	
Luke Moffatt	Univ. of Michigan	September 3	
Ryan Lasch	TPS	January 30	

Leaving
Player	New team	Date	Notes
Dick Axelsson	HC Davos	March 28	
Tom Nilsson	Toronto Maple Leafs	April 2	
John Klingberg	Dallas Stars	April 4	
Jonas Ahnelöv	Modo Hockey	April 9	
Alexander Wennberg	Columbus Blue Jackets	May 16	
Gustav Rydahl	Växjö Lakers	June 16	
Robin Söderqvist	Växjö Lakers	June 19	
Calle Rosén	Växjö Lakers	July 3	
Julius Bergman	San Jose Sharks	July 16	
Luke Moffatt	Storhamar Dragons	October 12	
