= 2021–22 SHL season =

- League: Swedish Hockey League
- Sport: Ice hockey
- Duration: 11 September 2021 – 24 March 2022; (Regular season); 26 March – 12 May 2022; (Playoffs)

Regular season
- First place: Rögle BK
- Top scorer: Ryan Lasch (Frölunda HC)
- Relegated to HockeyAllsvenskan: Djurgårdens IF

Playoffs
- Playoffs MVP: Per Åslund (Färjestad BK)
- Finals champions: Färjestad BK
- Runners-up: Luleå HF

SHL seasons
- ← 2020–21 2022–23 →

The 2021–22 SHL season was the 47th season of the Swedish Hockey League (SHL). The regular season began on 11 September 2021 and ended on 15 March 2022, it was then followed by the playoffs and the relegation playoffs. The league consisted of 14 teams; Timrå IK returned to the SHL after two seasons in HockeyAllsvenskan, having won the 2020–21 HockeyAllsvenskan.

Like the previous season, the COVID-19 pandemic in Sweden has resulted in many games being postponed, resulting in an uneven schedule.

== Teams ==
SHL team map

Team	City	Arena	Capacity
Brynäs IF	Gävle	Monitor ERP Arena	7,909
Djurgårdens IF	Stockholm	Hovet	8,094
Frölunda HC	Gothenburg	Scandinavium	12,044
Färjestad BK	Karlstad	Löfbergs Arena	8,647
Leksands IF	Leksand	Tegera Arena	7,650
Linköping HC	Linköping	Saab Arena	8,500
Luleå HF	Luleå	Coop Norrbotten Arena	6,300
Malmö Redhawks	Malmö	Malmö Arena	13,000
IK Oskarshamn	Oskarshamn	Be-Ge Hockey Center	3,275
Rögle BK	Ängelholm	Catena Arena	5,150
Skellefteå AIK	Skellefteå	Skellefteå Kraft Arena	6,001
Timrå IK	Timrå	NHC Arena	6,000
Växjö Lakers	Växjö	Vida Arena	5,700
Örebro HK	Örebro	Behrn Arena	5,150

== Regular season ==
Each team will play 52 games, playing each of the other thirteen teams four times: twice on home ice, and twice away from home. Points will be awarded for each game, where three points will be awarded for winning in regulation time, two points for winning in overtime or shootout, one point for losing in overtime or shootout, and zero points for losing in regulation time. At the end of the regular season, the team that will finish with the most points will be crowned the league champion.

The four best teams of the regular season will qualify for the 2022–23 Champions Hockey League (if the play-off winners qualify through the regular season, its spot will go to the 5th placed team of the regular season; if a Swedish team wins 2021–22 Champions Hockey League, three best teams of the regular season will qualify, and, if the play-off winners qualify through the regular season, its spot will go to the 4th placed team of the regular season).

=== Standings ===
Pos	Team	Pld	W	OTW	OTL	L	GF	GA	GD	Pts	Qualification
1	Rögle BK	52	27	5	9	11	154	129	+25	100	Qualification to Quarter-finals
2	Luleå HF	52	25	7	8	12	161	117	+44	97	Qualification to Quarter-finals
3	Skellefteå AIK	52	27	5	3	17	167	122	+45	94	Qualification to Quarter-finals
4	Frölunda HC	52	21	10	4	17	155	139	+16	87	Qualification to Quarter-finals
5	Växjö Lakers	52	22	6	7	17	153	144	+9	85	Qualification to Quarter-finals
6	Färjestad BK	52	22	6	4	20	153	149	+4	82	Qualification to Quarter-finals
7	Örebro HK	52	20	8	5	19	144	123	+21	81	Qualification to Eighth-finals
8	Leksands IF	52	20	4	7	21	148	154	−6	75	Qualification to Eighth-finals
9	IK Oskarshamn	52	20	3	6	23	140	163	−23	72	Qualification to Eighth-finals
10	Brynäs IF	52	17	6	6	23	126	138	−12	69	Qualification to Eighth-finals
11	Linköping HC	52	16	8	5	23	121	142	−21	69	
12	Malmö Redhawks	52	17	4	8	23	134	153	−19	67	
13	Djurgårdens IF (R)	52	14	5	6	27	130	169	−39	58	Qualification to Play Out
14	Timrå IK	52	14	5	4	29	133	177	−44	56	Qualification to Play Out

Source: SHL.se
Rules for classification: 1) Points; 2) Goal difference; 3) Number of goals scored
(R) Relegated

=== Statistics ===
==== Scoring leaders ====
The following shows the top ten players who led the league in points, at the conclusion of the regular season. If two or more skaters are tied (i.e. same number of points, goals and played games), all of the tied skaters are shown.

Player	Team	GP	G	A	Pts	+/–	PIM
(United States) Ryan Lasch	Frölunda HC	52	13	53	66	–1	8
(Canada) Max Véronneau	Leksands IF	51	34	26	60	+18	14
(Sweden) Linus Omark	Luleå HF	52	21	37	58	+11	32
(Sweden) Patrik Karlkvist	IK Oskarshamn	49	26	26	52	+6	2
(Sweden) Jonathan Johnson	Skellefteå AIK	51	14	38	52	+10	16
(Sweden) Richard Gynge	Växjö Lakers	52	23	25	48	–3	6
(United States) Carter Camper	Leksands IF	50	11	37	48	+7	28
(Canada) Ty Rattie	Timrå IK	51	21	26	47	–16	32
(Sweden) Linus Karlsson	Skellefteå AIK	52	26	20	46	+10	18
(Sweden) Leon Bristedt	Rögle BK	46	14	32	46	+19	78

==== Leading goaltenders ====
The following shows the top ten goaltenders who led the league in goals against average, provided that they have played at least 40% of their team's minutes, at the conclusion of the regular season.

Player	Team	GP	TOI	W	T	L	GA	SO	Sv%	GAA
(Sweden) Jesper Wallstedt	Luleå HF	22	1302:55	11	2	9	43	3	91.79	1.98
(Sweden) Jhonas Enroth	Örebro HK	42	2486:08	23	3	15	83	6	92.33	2.00
(Sweden) Gustaf Lindvall	Skellefteå AIK	30	1797:18	17	3	10	62	3	91.98	2.07
(United States) Strauss Mann	Skellefteå AIK	22	1317:55	13	1	8	48	3	91.44	2.19
(Sweden) Joel Lassinantti	Luleå HF	31	1839:35	18	4	8	67	4	91.10	2.19
(Finland) Veini Vehviläinen	Brynäs IF	45	2600:51	20	4	20	101	5	90.77	2.33
(Sweden) Adam Åhman	Växjö Lakers	29	1662:02	11	3	13	65	3	90.90	2.35
(Sweden) Christoffer Rifalk	Rögle BK	37	2189:08	22	1	14	87	4	92.05	2.38
(Sweden) Marcus Högberg	Linköping HC	41	2426:19	17	4	19	97	4	91.07	2.40
(Sweden) Daniel Marmenlind	Malmö Redhawks	31	1870:23	12	5	14	75	1	90.48	2.41

== Playoffs ==
Ten teams qualify for the playoffs: the top six teams in the regular season have a bye to the quarterfinals, while teams ranked seventh to tenth meet each other (7 versus 10, 8 versus 9) in a preliminary playoff round.

=== Format ===
In the first round, the 7th-ranked team meets the 10th-ranked team and the 8th-ranked team meets the 9th-ranked team for a place in the second round. In the second round, the top-ranked team will meet the lowest-ranked winner of the first round, the second-ranked team will face the other winner of the first round, the third-ranked team will face the sixth-ranked team, and the fourth-ranked team will face the fifth-ranked team. In the third round, the highest remaining seed is matched against the lowest remaining seed. In each round the higher-seeded team is awarded home advantage. The meetings are in the first round played as best-of-three series, and in the later rounds as best-of-seven series. In the eighth-finals, the higher-seeded teams play at home for game 2 (plus 3 if necessary) while the lower-seeded teams play at home for game 1. In the later rounds, the higher-seeded teams are at home for games 1 and 2 (plus 5 and 7 if necessary) while the lower-seeded teams are at home for games 3 and 4 (plus 6 if necessary).

=== Playoff bracket ===
Eighth-finals; Swedish: Åttondelsfinal
7	Örebro HK	2
10	Brynäs IF	1
8	Leksands IF	1
9	IK Oskarshamn	2

Quarter-finals; Swedish: Kvartsfinal
1	Rögle BK	4
9	IK Oskarshamn	3
2	Luleå HF	4
7	Örebro HK	1
3	Skellefteå AIK	2
6	Färjestad BK	4
4	Frölunda HC	4
5	Växjö Lakers	0

Semi-finals
1	Rögle BK	2
6	Färjestad BK	4
(Pairings are re-seeded after the first and second round)
2	Luleå HF	4
4	Frölunda HC	1

Finals
6	Färjestad BK	4
2	Luleå HF	3

=== Eighth-finals ===
==== (7) Örebro HK vs. (10) Brynäs IF ====
26 March	Brynäs IF	2–7	Örebro HK	Monitor ERP Arena	Recap
Linus Ölund (1) – 11:19		First period	No scoring
No scoring		Second period	13:33 – Emil Larsson (1); 14:27 – Rodrigo Ābols (1)
Tomi Sallinen (1) – 15:02		Third period	1:09 – Rodrigo Ābols (2); 3:37 – Robin Kovacs (1); 8:28 – Linus Öberg (1); 17:42 – Rodrigo Ābols (3; ENG); 19:39 – Rodrigo Ābols (4; PPG)
Veini Vehviläinen (15 shots / 12 saves); Kristers Gudļevskis (11 shots / 8 saves)		Goalie stats	Jhonas Enroth (23 shots / 21 saves)

28 March	Örebro HK	0–3	Brynäs IF	Behrn Arena	Recap
No scoring		First period	No scoring
No scoring		Second period	3:55 – Dmytro Timashov (1); 13:48 – Simon Bertilsson (1)
No scoring		Third period	17:21 – Greg Scott (1; SHG/ENG)
Jhonas Enroth (22 shots / 20 saves)		Goalie stats	Veini Vehviläinen (24 shots / 24 saves)

29 March	Örebro HK	4–2	Brynäs IF	Behrn Arena	Recap
Robert Leino (1; PPG) – 9:23		First period	6:09 – Anton Rödin (1)
No scoring		Second period	18:36 – Oscar Eklind (1)
Rodrigo Ābols (5; PPG) – 1:06; Linus Öberg (2) – 12:07; Jani Lajunen (1; SHG/ENG) – 19:48		Third period	No scoring
Jhonas Enroth (20 shots / 18 saves)		Goalie stats	Veini Vehviläinen (25 shots / 22 saves)

Örebro HK win series 2–1

==== (8) Leksands IF vs. (9) IK Oskarshamn ====
26 March	IK Oskarshamn	3–1	Leksands IF	Be-Ge Hockey Center	Recap
No scoring		First period	No scoring
Johannes Salmonsson (1) – 15:17		Second period	No scoring
Patrik Karlkvist (1; PPG) – 0:41; Kim Rosdahl (1; ENG) – 17:07		Third period	18:59 – Jon Knuts (1)
Tim Juel (39 shots / 38 saves)		Goalie stats	Kasimir Kaskisuo (31 shots / 29 saves)

28 March	Leksands IF	4–1	IK Oskarshamn	Tegera Arena	Recap
No scoring		First period	18:33 – Patrik Karlkvist (2; PPG)
Mikael Ruohomaa (1; PPG) – 3:33; Oskar Lang (1) – 7:13		Second period	No scoring
Justin Kloos (1) – 2:48; Marek Hrivík (1; ENG) – 18:21		Third period	No scoring
Kasimir Kaskisuo (20 shots / 19 saves)		Goalie stats	Tim Juel (23 shots / 20 saves)

29 March	Leksands IF	2–4	IK Oskarshamn	Tegera Arena	Recap
Calle Själin (1) – 3:07		First period	5:11 – Kim Rosdahl (2); 19:16 – Philip Samuelsson (1)
Linus Andersson (1; PPG) – 3:34		Second period	7:44 – Fredrik Olofsson (1)
No scoring		Third period	1:09 – Jonas Engström (1)
Kasimir Kaskisuo (28 shots / 24 saves)		Goalie stats	Tim Juel (39 shots / 37 saves)

IK Oskarshamn win series 2–1

=== Quarter-finals ===
==== (1) Rögle BK vs. (9) IK Oskarshamn ====
31 March	Rögle BK	1–2	IK Oskarshamn	Catena Arena	Recap
No scoring		First period	No scoring
No scoring		Second period	15:26 – Hynek Zohorna (1; PPG)
Dennis Everberg (1; PPG) – 1:48		Third period	3:31 – Robin Norell (1)
Christoffer Rifalk (26 shots / 24 saves)		Goalie stats	Joe Cannata (20 shots / 19 saves)

2 April	IK Oskarshamn	2–3	Rögle BK	Be-Ge Hockey Center	Recap
Brian Cooper (1) – 15:27		First period	9:43 – Adam Tambellini (1)
No scoring		Second period	13:08 – Adam Edström (1)
Tomáš Zohorna (1) – 1:24		Third period	6:25 – Anton Bengtsson (1)
Tim Juel (36 shots / 33 saves)		Goalie stats	Christoffer Rifalk (23 shots / 21 saves)

4 April	Rögle BK	4–1	IK Oskarshamn	Catena Arena	Recap
Ted Brithén (1) – 13:14		First period	No scoring
Lucas Ekeståhl-Jonsson (1; PPG) – 1:18; Valtteri Kemiläinen (1; PPG) – 3:42; Anton Bengtsson (2) – 13:01		Second period	18:20 – Lukas Pilö (1)
No scoring		Third period	No scoring
Christoffer Rifalk (12 shots / 11 saves)		Goalie stats	Tim Juel (34 shots / 30 saves)

6 April	IK Oskarshamn	1–0	Rögle BK	Be-Ge Hockey Center	Recap
Cameron Brace (1) – 8:38		First period	No scoring
No scoring		Second period	No scoring
No scoring		Third period	No scoring
Tim Juel (17 shots / 17 saves)		Goalie stats	Christoffer Rifalk (27 shots / 26 saves)

8 April	Rögle BK	1–4	IK Oskarshamn	Catena Arena	Recap
Marco Kasper (1; PPG) – 10:15		First period	No scoring
No scoring		Second period	1:11 – Jonas Engström (2); 4:20 – Tomáš Zohorna (2)
No scoring		Third period	3:34 – Cameron Brace (2); 19:03 – Jonas Engström (3; ENG)
Christoffer Rifalk (27 shots / 24 saves)		Goalie stats	Tim Juel (30 shots / 29 saves)

10 April	IK Oskarshamn	2–5	Rögle BK	Be-Ge Hockey Center	Recap
No scoring		First period	13:16 – Daniel Zaar (1)
Jonas Engström (4) – 6:45; Fredrik Olofsson (2) – 14:14		Second period	15:12 – Daniel Zaar (2); 18:53 – Adam Tambellini (2; PPG)
No scoring		Third period	3:24 – Dennis Everberg (2); 19:34 – Ludvig Larsson (1; ENG)
Tim Juel (29 shots / 25 saves)		Goalie stats	Calle Clang (25 shots / 23 saves)

12 April	Rögle BK	4–1	IK Oskarshamn	Catena Arena	Recap
Anton Bengtsson (3) – 2:59		First period	19:43 – Kim Rosdahl (3; PPG)
No scoring		Second period	No scoring
Dennis Everberg (3; PPG) – 8:41; Ludvig Larsson (2) – 10:02; William Wallinder (1; ENG) – 17:31		Third period	No scoring
Calle Clang (19 shots / 18 saves); Christoffer Rifalk (2 shots / 2 saves)		Goalie stats	Tim Juel (35 shots / 32 saves)

Rögle BK win series 4–3

==== (2) Luleå HF vs. (7) Örebro HK ====
31 March	Luleå HF	5–1	Örebro HK	Coop Norrbotten Arena	Recap
Pontus Andreasson (1) – 3:18; Pontus Andreasson (2) – 13:43		First period	No scoring
Olli Nikupeteri (1) – 7:27; Pontus Andreasson (3; PPG) – 15:36		Second period	10:18 – Rodrigo Ābols (6)
Linus Omark (1) – 14:47		Third period	No scoring
Joel Lassinantti (20 shots / 19 saves)		Goalie stats	Jhonas Enroth (15 shots / 11 saves); Jonas Arntzen (5 shots / 4 saves)

2 April	Örebro HK	2–1	2OT	Luleå HF	Behrn Arena	Recap
No scoring		First period		No scoring
No scoring		Second period		14:17 – Pontus Andreasson (4)
Robert Leino (2) – 4:22		Third period		No scoring
Emil Larsson (2) – 0:49		Second overtime period		No scoring
Jhonas Enroth (28 shots / 27 saves)		Goalie stats		Joel Lassinantti (25 shots / 23 saves)

4 April	Luleå HF	3–1	Örebro HK	Coop Norrbotten Arena	Recap
No scoring		First period	15:04 – Oscar Eklind (2; SHG)
Linus Fröberg (1) – 8:34		Second period	No scoring
Isac Brännström (1) – 13:22; Carl Mattsson (1; ENG) – 19:48		Third period	No scoring
Joel Lassinantti (26 shots / 25 saves)		Goalie stats	Jhonas Enroth (31 shots / 29 saves)

6 April	Örebro HK	1–2	Luleå HF	Behrn Arena	Recap
No scoring		First period	No scoring
Linus Öberg (3; PPG) – 8:32		Second period	7:02 – Pontus Andreasson (5); 18:23 – Pontus Andreasson (6)
No scoring		Third period	No scoring
Jhonas Enroth (19 shots / 17 saves)		Goalie stats	Joel Lassinantti (22 shots / 21 saves)

8 April	Luleå HF	3–2	2OT	Örebro HK	Coop Norrbotten Arena	Recap
No scoring		First period		No scoring
Oscar Engsund (1) – 6:54; Sami Lepistö (1) – 12:33		Second period		11:20 – Christopher Mastomäki (1)
No scoring		Third period		13:37 – Rodrigo Ābols (7)
Pontus Andreasson (7; PPG) – 9:41		Second overtime period		No scoring
Joel Lassinantti (22 shots / 20 saves)		Goalie stats		Jhonas Enroth (49 shots / 46 saves)

Luleå HF win series 4–1

==== (3) Skellefteå AIK vs. (6) Färjestad BK ====
1 April	Skellefteå AIK	1–2	Färjestad BK	Skellefteå Kraft Arena	Recap
No scoring		First period	No scoring
Filip Sandberg (1; PPG) – 4:49		Second period	7:47 – Joakim Nygård (1)
No scoring		Third period	19:00 – Victor Ejdsell (1)
Gustaf Lindvall (25 shots / 23 saves)		Goalie stats	Dominik Furch (31 shots / 30 saves)

3 April	Färjestad BK	4–3	Skellefteå AIK	Löfbergs Arena	Recap
No scoring		First period	19:26 – Jonathan Pudas (1; PPG)
Victor Ejdsell (2) – 3:52; Gustav Rydahl (1) – 4:26		Second period	18:06 – Joakim Lindström (1)
Mikael Wikstrand (1) – 8:38; Patrik Lundh (1) – 10:11		Third period	15:47 – Joakim Lindström (2)
Dominik Furch (35 shots / 32 saves)		Goalie stats	Gustaf Lindvall (19 shots / 15 saves)

5 April	Skellefteå AIK	3–2	Färjestad BK	Skellefteå Kraft Arena	Recap
Rickard Hugg (1; PPG) – 1:37; Joakim Lindström (3) – 7:14; Joakim Lindström (4) – 18:28		First period	5:13 – Gustav Rydahl (2)
No scoring		Second period	No scoring
No scoring		Third period	4:24 – Daniel Viksten (1)
Strauss Mann (20 shots / 18 saves)		Goalie stats	Dominik Furch (33 shots / 30 saves)

7 April	Färjestad BK	4–1	Skellefteå AIK	Löfbergs Arena	Recap
No scoring		First period	No scoring
Linus Johansson (1; PPG) – 9:16		Second period	No scoring
Per Åslund (1) – 1:00; Patrik Lundh (2; ENG) – 18:25; Gustav Rydahl (3; ENG) – 19:28		Third period	3:12 – Jonathan Johnson (1)
Dominik Furch (17 shots / 16 saves)		Goalie stats	Strauss Mann (31 shots / 29 saves)

9 April	Skellefteå AIK	4–2	Färjestad BK	Skellefteå Kraft Arena	Recap
Rickard Hugg (2; PPG) – 3:27; Jonathan Pudas (2) – 7:25		First period	11:11 – Marcus Nilsson (1; PPG)
Michael Kapla (1; PPG) – 10:34		Second period	No scoring
Filip Sandberg (2; ENG) – 19:19		Third period	4:09 – Albert Johansson (1)
Gustaf Lindvall (26 shots / 24 saves)		Goalie stats	Dominik Furch (28 shots / 25 saves)

11 April	Färjestad BK	5–0	Skellefteå AIK	Löfbergs Arena	Recap
Michael Lindqvist (1; PPG) – 11:36; Michael Lindqvist (2) – 15:27		First period	No scoring
Gustav Rydahl (4) – 8:32		Second period	No scoring
Victor Ejdsell (3) – 10:00; Theodor Lennström (1; ENG) – 16:47		Third period	No scoring
Dominik Furch (32 shots / 32 saves)		Goalie stats	Gustaf Lindvall (21 shots / 17 saves)

Färjestad BK win series 4–2

==== (4) Frölunda HC vs. (5) Växjö Lakers ====
1 April	Frölunda HC	4–3	OT	Växjö Lakers	Scandinavium	Recap
Patrik Carlsson (1) – 5:00		First period		18:13 – Richard Gynge (1; PPG)
Patrik Carlsson (2) – 6:06; Patrik Carlsson (3) – 11:50		Second period		No scoring
No scoring		Third period		1:40 – Joel Persson (1); 10:43 – Olle Lycksell (1)
Jan Muršak (1) – 9:45		First overtime period		No scoring
Matt Tomkins (24 shots / 21 saves)		Goalie stats		Adam Åhman (51 shots / 47 saves)

3 April	Växjö Lakers	4–5	2OT	Frölunda HC	Vida Arena	Recap
Joel Persson (2) – 11:30		First period		5:23 – Filip Johansson (1; PPG)
Joel Kellman (1; PPG) – 2:39		Second period		0:39 – Karl Henriksson (1); 10:32 – Radan Lenc (1)
Olle Lycksell (2) – 3:37; Julius Nättinen (1) – 14:50		Third period		1:50 – Elmer Söderblom (1)
No scoring		Second overtime period		4:59 – Nicklas Lasu (1)
Adam Åhman (37 shots / 32 saves)		Goalie stats		Matt Tomkins (38 shots / 34 saves)

5 April	Frölunda HC	4–3	OT	Växjö Lakers	Scandinavium	Recap
Patrik Carlsson (4) – 13:36		First period		5:50 – Richard Gynge (2)
Nicklas Lasu (2) – 6:08; Michael Špaček (1) – 15:34		Second period		7:51 – Richard Gynge (3); 11:07 – Richard Gynge (4)
No scoring		Third period		No scoring
Stefan Elliott (1) – 4:52		First overtime period		No scoring
Matt Tomkins (22 shots / 19 saves)		Goalie stats		Emil Larmi (46 shots / 42 saves)

7 April	Växjö Lakers	2–5	Frölunda HC	Vida Arena	Recap
No scoring		First period	3:38 – Stefan Elliott (2); 4:07 – Jan Muršak (2)
Richard Gynge (5) – 0:58		Second period	5:45 – Elmer Söderblom (2); 11:48 – Filip Johansson (2; PPG)
Olle Lycksell (3; PPG) – 13:57		Third period	18:55 – Andreas Borgman (1; ENG)
Emil Larmi (23 shots / 19 saves)		Goalie stats	Matt Tomkins (27 shots / 25 saves)

Frölunda HC win series 4–0

=== Semi-finals ===
==== (1) Rögle BK vs. (6) Färjestad BK ====
16 April	Rögle BK	3–4	Färjestad BK	Catena Arena	Recap
No scoring		First period	9:02 – Jacob de la Rose (1)
Valtteri Kemiläinen (2; PPG) – 18:02		Second period	14:35 – Jacob de la Rose (2); 19:42 – Theodor Lennström (2)
Anton Bengtsson (4) – 6:08; Marco Kasper (2; EA) – 19:59		Third period	19:17 – Per Åslund (2; ENG)
Calle Clang (24 shots / 21 saves)		Goalie stats	Dominik Furch (21 shots / 18 saves)

18 April	Färjestad BK	2–1	Rögle BK	Löfbergs Arena	Recap
Gustav Rydahl (5) – 12:26		First period	No scoring
No scoring		Second period	18:18 – Daniel Zaar (3)
Albert Johansson (2) – 17:33		Third period	No scoring
Dominik Furch (17 shots / 16 saves)		Goalie stats	Christoffer Rifalk (37 shots / 35 saves)

20 April	Rögle BK	3–2	Färjestad BK	Catena Arena	Recap
No scoring		First period	No scoring
Ludvig Larsson (3) – 2:35; Oliver Tärnström (1) – 5:07; Ludvig Larsson (4) – 9:59		Second period	2:12 – Adam Ginning (1); 4:53 – Gustav Rydahl (6; PPG)
No scoring		Third period	No scoring
Christoffer Rifalk (32 shots / 30 saves)		Goalie stats	Dominik Furch (27 shots / 24 saves)

22 April	Färjestad BK	6–2	Rögle BK	Löfbergs Arena	Recap
Pontus Widerström (1) – 2:23; Marcus Nilsson (2; PPG) – 11:57		First period	No scoring
Daniel Viksten (2; PPG) – 3:50; Victor Ejdsell (4; PPG) – 16:57		Second period	7:55 – Anton Bengtsson (5; PPG); 10:27 – Adam Tambellini (3; PPG)
Adam Ginning (2) – 4:30; Victor Ejdsell (5; ENG) – 14:29		Third period	No scoring
Dominik Furch (29 shots / 27 saves)		Goalie stats	Christoffer Rifalk (33 shots / 28 saves)

24 April	Rögle BK	5–1	Färjestad BK	Catena Arena	Recap
Daniel Zaar (4) – 2:43; Vojtěch Mozík (1) – 6:37		First period	No scoring
No scoring		Second period	9:21 – Jesse Virtanen (1)
Adam Tambellini (4; PPG) – 0:31; Vojtěch Mozík (2; PPG) – 17:55; Oliver Tärnström (2; ENG) – 18:30		Third period	No scoring
Christoffer Rifalk (35 shots / 34 saves)		Goalie stats	Dominik Furch (24 shots / 20 saves)

26 April	Färjestad BK	5–4	2OT	Rögle BK	Löfbergs Arena	Recap
Jacob de la Rose (3) – 17:34		First period		No scoring
Victor Ejdsell (6) – 6:04; Victor Ejdsell (7) – 17:04		Second period		1:44 – Marco Kasper (3); 2:20 – Oliver Tärnström (3)
Daniel Viksten (3) – 17:28		Third period		14:29 – Adam Edström (2); 17:04 – Adam Edström (3)
Linus Johansson (2) – 10:56		Second overtime period		No scoring
Dominik Furch (26 shots / 22 saves)		Goalie stats		Christoffer Rifalk (55 shots / 50 saves)

Färjestad BK win series 4–2

==== (2) Luleå HF vs. (4) Frölunda HC ====
15 April	Luleå HF	3–6	Frölunda HC	Coop Norrbotten Arena	Recap
Sami Lepistö (2) – 2:56		First period	15:21 – Patrik Carlsson (5); 19:45 – Theodor Niederbach (1)
Julius Honka (1) – 4:48		Second period	3:37 – Joel Lundqvist (1); 6:50 – Elmer Söderblom (3)
Julius Honka (2; PPG) – 6:35		Third period	4:37 – Filip Johansson (3; PPG); 17:21 – Jan Muršak (3; ENG)
Joel Lassinantti (31 shots / 26 saves)		Goalie stats	Matt Tomkins (32 shots / 29 saves)

17 April	Frölunda HC	2–4	Luleå HF	Scandinavium	Recap
Radan Lenc (2; PPG) – 4:09		First period	2:26 – Linus Fröberg (2; PPG); 3:22 – Jack Connolly (1)
Filip Johansson (4) – 18:01		Second period	0:41 – Erik Gustafsson (1)
No scoring		Third period	7:21 – Juhani Tyrväinen (1; PPG)
Matt Tomkins (26 shots / 22 saves)		Goalie stats	Joel Lassinantti (24 shots / 22 saves)

19 April	Luleå HF	4–2	Frölunda HC	Coop Norrbotten Arena	Recap
Linus Omark (2; PPG) – 12:00; Olli Nikupeteri (2) – 16:56		First period	No scoring
No scoring		Second period	13:13 – Filip Johansson (5)
Carl Mattsson (2) – 10:29; Linus Omark (3; ENG) – 18:52		Third period	13:39 – Andreas Borgman (2)
Joel Lassinantti (23 shots / 21 saves)		Goalie stats	Niklas Rubin (20 shots / 17 saves)

21 April	Frölunda HC	0–2	Luleå HF	Scandinavium	Recap
No scoring		First period	No scoring
No scoring		Second period	15:46 – Juhani Tyrväinen (2)
No scoring		Third period	19:00 – Isac Brännström (2; ENG)
Matt Tomkins (15 shots / 14 saves)		Goalie stats	Joel Lassinantti (27 shots / 27 saves)

23 April	Luleå HF	4–1	Frölunda HC	Coop Norrbotten Arena	Recap
Isac Brännström (3) – 8:02; Pontus Andreasson (8) – 17:55		First period	13:53 – Karl Henriksson (2)
Jonas Berglund (1; PPG) – 14:29		Second period	No scoring
Linus Omark (4; ENG) – 19:13		Third period	No scoring
Joel Lassinantti (21 shots / 20 saves)		Goalie stats	Matt Tomkins (16 shots / 13 saves)

Luleå HF win series 4–1

=== Finals ===
==== (2) Luleå HF vs. (6) Färjestad BK ====
30 April	Luleå HF	4–1	Färjestad BK	Coop Norrbotten Arena	Recap
Jack Connolly (2; PPG) – 19:05		First period	18:00 – Per Åslund (3; SHG)
No scoring		Second period	No scoring
Julius Honka (3) – 0:49; Einar Emanuelsson (1) – 1:43; Juhani Tyrväinen (3) – 15:33		Third period	No scoring
Joel Lassinantti (24 shots / 23 saves)		Goalie stats	Dominik Furch (31 shots / 27 saves)

2 May	Färjestad BK	4–0	Luleå HF	Löfbergs Arena	Recap
Theodor Lennström (3; PPG) – 12:57; Daniel Viksten (4) – 14:28		First period	No scoring
Martin Johansson (1) – 5:10		Second period	No scoring
Joakim Nygård (2; ENG) – 14:25		Third period	No scoring
Dominik Furch (24 shots / 24 saves)		Goalie stats	Joel Lassinantti (23 shots / 20 saves); Jesper Wallstedt (6 shots / 6 saves)

3 May	Luleå HF	5–4	OT	Färjestad BK	Coop Norrbotten Arena	Recap
Juhani Tyrväinen (4) – 3:23; Isac Brännström (4) – 4:48; Einar Emanuelsson (2) – 14:53		First period		18:59 – Linus Johansson (3)
No scoring		Second period		10:02 – Victor Ejdsell (8)
Konstantin Komarek (1) – 2:06		Third period		4:01 – Adam Ginning (3); 15:38 – Michael Lindqvist (3; PPG)
Einar Emanuelsson (3) – 4:01		First overtime period		No scoring
Joel Lassinantti (24 shots / 20 saves)		Goalie stats		Dominik Furch (25 shots / 20 saves)

5 May	Färjestad BK	3–2	OT	Luleå HF	Löfbergs Arena	Recap
Pontus Widerström (2) – 11:31; Per Åslund (4) – 18:20		First period		No scoring
No scoring		Second period		7:43 – Oscar Engsund (2)
No scoring		Third period		10:06 – Brendan Shinnimin (1)
Jesse Virtanen (2) – 4:05		First overtime period		No scoring
Dominik Furch (27 shots / 25 saves)		Goalie stats		Joel Lassinantti (37 shots / 34 saves)

7 May	Luleå HF	4–0	Färjestad BK	Coop Norrbotten Arena	Recap
No scoring		First period	No scoring
Julius Honka (4) – 10:12		Second period	No scoring
Jack Connolly (3) – 11:44; Einar Emanuelsson (4) – 15:20; Jack Connolly (4; ENG) – 17:01		Third period	No scoring
Joel Lassinantti (16 shots / 16 saves)		Goalie stats	Dominik Furch (21 shots / 18 saves)

9 May	Färjestad BK	3–1	Luleå HF	Löfbergs Arena	Recap
Theodor Lennström (4; PPG) – 10:35; Linus Johansson (4) – 12:28		First period	No scoring
No scoring		Second period	No scoring
Per Åslund (5; PPG) – 17:20		Third period	15:21 – Einar Emanuelsson (5)
Dominik Furch (24 shots / 23 saves)		Goalie stats	Joel Lassinantti (24 shots / 21 saves)

12 May	Luleå HF	0–3	Färjestad BK	Coop Norrbotten Arena	Recap
No scoring		First period	No scoring
No scoring		Second period	No scoring
No scoring		Third period	10:33 – Jesse Virtanen (3); 17:42 – Linus Johansson (5); 18:35 – Joakim Nygård (3; ENG)
Joel Lassinantti (16 shots / 14 saves)		Goalie stats	Dominik Furch (17 shots / 17 saves)

Färjestad BK win series 4–3

=== Statistics ===
==== Scoring leaders ====
The following players led the league in points, at the conclusion of the playoffs. If two or more skaters are tied (i.e. same number of points, goals and played games), all of the tied skaters are shown.

Player	Team	GP	G	A	Pts	+/–	PIM
(Sweden) Per Åslund	Färjestad BK	19	5	13	18	+11	8
(Sweden) Linus Omark	Luleå HF	17	4	13	17	+7	10
(Sweden) Joakim Nygård	Färjestad BK	19	3	12	15	+12	6
(Finland) Sami Lepistö	Luleå HF	17	2	13	15	+6	20
(Sweden) Victor Ejdsell	Färjestad BK	19	8	6	14	+5	16
(Sweden) Theodor Lennström	Färjestad BK	19	4	10	14	+5	18
(Sweden) Pontus Andreasson	Luleå HF	13	8	5	13	+6	12
(Sweden) Gustav Rydahl	Färjestad BK	19	6	6	12	+9	23
(Sweden) Linus Johansson	Färjestad BK	19	5	6	11	+2	35
(Sweden) Daniel Zaar	Rögle BK	13	4	7	11	–5	2

==== Leading goaltenders ====
The following shows the top five goaltenders who led the league in goals against average, provided that they have played at least 40% of their team's minutes, at the conclusion of the playoffs.

Player	Team	GP	TOI	W	L	GA	SO	Sv%	GAA
(Sweden) Joel Lassinantti	Luleå HF	17	1053:45	11	6	33	2	91.85	1.88
(Sweden) Jhonas Enroth	Örebro HK	8	504:13	3	5	18	0	91.30	2.14
(Czech Republic) Dominik Furch	Färjestad BK	19	1172:02	12	7	43	3	91.21	2.20
(Finland) Veini Vehviläinen	Brynäs IF	3	160:08	1	2	6	1	90.63	2.25
(Sweden) Christoffer Rifalk	Rögle BK	11	624:26	4	6	24	0	92.36	2.31

== Play Out ==
Teams 13 and 14 from the regular season played a best-of-seven series, with the winner remaining in the SHL and the loser relegated to the second tier, HockeyAllsvenskan. The higher-seeded team held home advantage over the series, playing at home for the odd-numbered games while the lower-seeded team was at home for the even-numbered games.

26 March	Djurgårdens IF	2–4	Timrå IK	Hovet	Recap
Emil Berglund (1) – 17:58		First period	No scoring
No scoring		Second period	5:02 – Nolan Zajac (1); 8:35 – Jacob Blomqvist (1); 10:54 – Joey LaLeggia (1)
Dick Axelsson (1; PPG) – 18:54		Third period	16:40 – Sebastian Hartmann (1)
Alexander Salák (31 shots / 27 saves)		Goalie stats	Jacob Johansson (25 shots / 23 saves)

28 March	Timrå IK	4–3	Djurgårdens IF	NHC Arena	Recap
No scoring		First period	No scoring
Sebastian Hartmann (2; PPG) – 15:25; Ty Rattie (1; PPG) – 17:19		Second period	4:39 – Cameron Schilling (1); 7:23 – Marcus Sörensen (1; PPG)
Sebastian Hartmann (3; PPG) – 17:35; Tim Erixon (1) – 19:53		Third period	14:06 – Marc-André Gragnani (1)
Jacob Johansson (30 shots / 27 saves)		Goalie stats	Mantas Armalis (39 shots / 35 saves)

31 March	Djurgårdens IF	3–5	Timrå IK	Hovet	Recap
No scoring		First period	10:52 – Robin Hanzl (1)
Éric Gélinas (1; PPG) – 2:01		Second period	10:04 – Filip Westerlund (1); 13:05 – Robin Hanzl (2; PS)
Cameron Schilling (2) – 5:53; Filip Cederqvist (1) – 8:06		Third period	2:36 – Ty Rattie (2; PPG); 18:51 – Sebastian Hartmann (4; ENG)
Alexander Salák (23 shots / 19 saves)		Goalie stats	Jacob Johansson (36 shots / 33 saves)

2 April	Timrå IK	3–1	Djurgårdens IF	NHC Arena	Recap
No scoring		First period	No scoring
Robin Hanzl (3) – 12:52; Ty Rattie (3) – 13:48; Robin Hanzl (4) – 19:05		Second period	No scoring
No scoring		Third period	19:41 – William Eklund (1)
Jacob Johansson (27 shots / 26 saves)		Goalie stats	Mantas Armalis (29 shots / 26 saves)

Timrå IK win series 4–0

== SHL awards ==
Award	Winner(s)
Guldhjälmen	Max Véronneau (Leksands IF)
Guldpucken	
Honken Trophy	Jhonas Enroth (Örebro HK)
Håkan Loob Trophy	Max Véronneau (Leksands IF)
Rookie of the Year	Linus Karlsson (Skellefteå AIK)
Salming Trophy	Maja Nylén Persson (Brynäs IF)
Stefan Liv Memorial Trophy	Per Åslund (Färjestad BK)
Guldpipan	
