= Jakob Olsson =

Jakob Olsson may refer to:

- Jakob Olsson (footballer)
- Jakob Olsson (ice hockey)
