= Filip Johansson =

Filip Johansson may refer to:

- Filip Johansson (ice hockey)
- Filip Johansson (footballer)
