= Joakim Nygård =

Swedish professional ice hockey forward (born 1993)

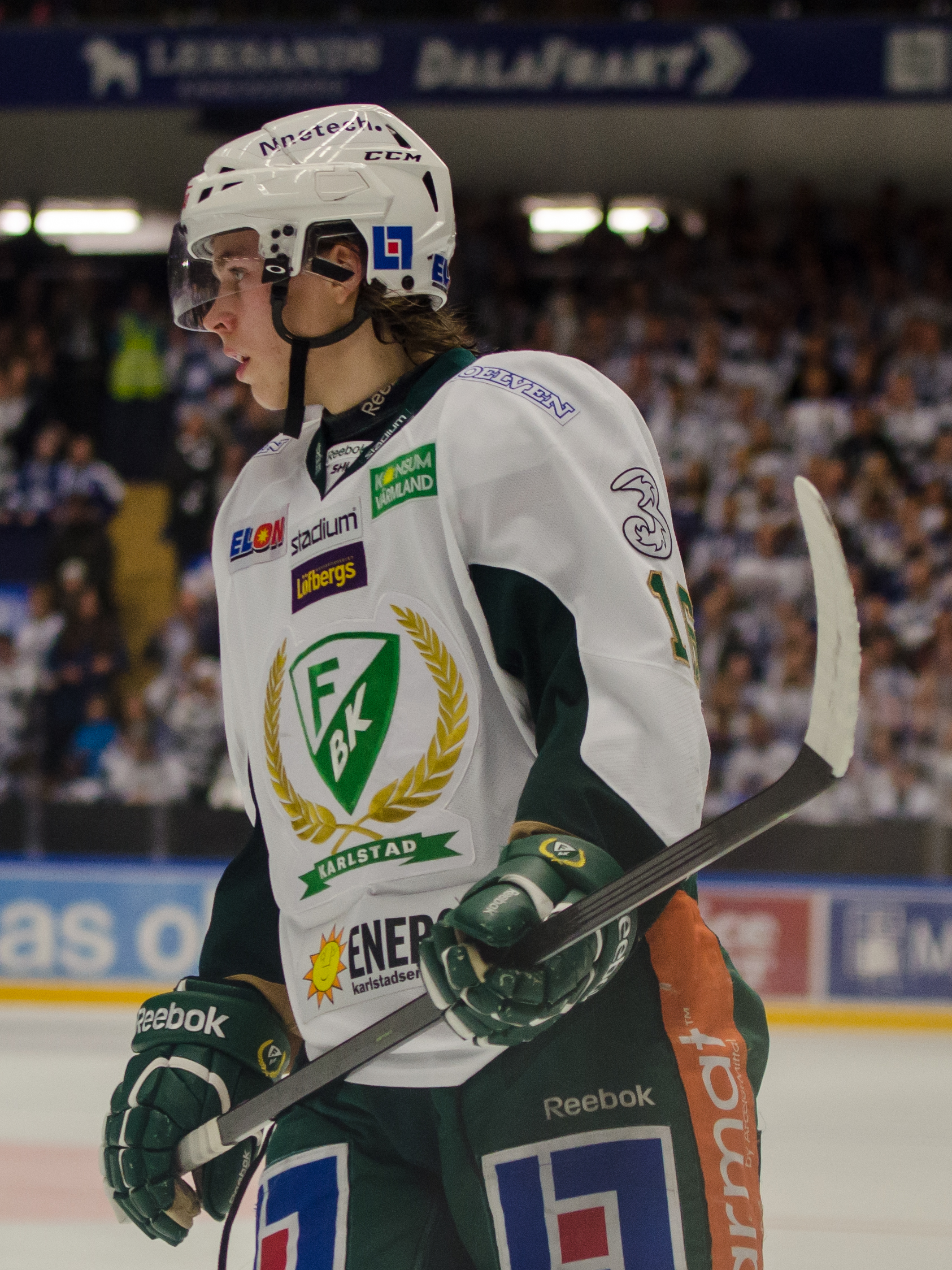
- Nygård with Färjestad BK in 2013
- Born: 8 January 1993 (age 33) Stockholm, Sweden
- Height: 6 ft 2 in (188 cm)
- Weight: 193 lb (88 kg; 13 st 11 lb)
- Position: Forward
- Shoots: Left
- SHL team Former teams: Färjestad BK; Edmonton Oilers
- NHL draft: Undrafted
- Playing career: 2010–present

Joakim Nygård (born 8 January 1993) is a Swedish professional ice hockey forward for Färjestad BK of the Swedish Hockey League (SHL).

An undrafted player Nygård was signed by the NHL's Edmonton Oilers in 2019 from Färjestad BK. He played 42 NHL games for the Oilers before re-signing with Färjestad BK. In 2022 he was part of the Färjestad BK team that won the Le Mat Trophy as Swedish Hockey League Champions in 2022.

== Playing career ==
Nygård originally played as a youth with Stockholm-based, Skå IK, whose junior team he played for during his early teens. In 2009, Nygård, then 16 years old, moved from Stockholm to Sunne in Värmland County to play for Sunne IK's J18 and J20 teams. He made his professional debut with the men's team, playing a single game in the Hockeyettan (Div.1).

=== Färjestad BK ===
Following two seasons as Sunne IK's top-scoring youth in the J18 and J20, Nygård secured a contract to play in the J20 SuperElit with top-tier club, Färjestad BK in the 2011–12 season. He quickly adapted to the SuperElit, establishing himself offensively in placing second to Linus Fröberg in scoring with 16 goals and 46 points in 49 games.

In the 2012–13 season, Nygård made his Elitserien debut featuring in the lineup with Färjestad BK against HV71 on 13 September 2012, without any time-on-ice. He registered his first ice time with 5 minutes in his fifth match on 24 November 2012 against Frölunda HC. Nygård scored his first Elitserien goal on 23 February 2013 against Modo Hockey. He finished his first top league season with 1 goal and 2 points in 28 games. In splitting the season with Färjestad's J20 team, he finished second in regular season scoring with 45 points in just 37 games. He led the team with 5 goals in the playoffs to capture the bronze medal.

On 27 March 2013, Nygård was signed to his first full SHL contract, signing a two-year deal to continue with Färjestad BK. Cementing a role within Färjestad BK forwards, Nygård appeared in 50 games in the 2013–14 season, posting 14 points and helping the club reach the Championship finals in a silver medal finish. During his third season with Färjestad BK in the 2014–15 season, Nygård was signed to an improved two-year contract extension on 14 January 2015.

In the 2016–17 season, Nygård broke out offensively, showing his speed and skill in notching 29 points in 52 games. He continued to increase his scoring rate in the following 2017–18 season, recording his first SHL hat-trick on 19 October 2017 in a 4–2 victory over Luleå HF. He finished the season placing third in team scoring with 34 points in 52 games.

Returning for his seventh season in the SHL with Färjestad BK in the 2018–19 campaign, Nygård in a top-line scoring role finished second in the league with 21 goals in 52 games. His contract was extended during the season for a further three years with Färjestad on 31 January 2019. In the SHL playoffs, he added 10 points in 14 post-season games before losing to Djurgårdens IF in the semi-finals.

=== Edmonton Oilers ===
Undrafted, Nygård attracted interest in the off-season as a free agent from North America. On 24 May 2019, he used his NHL out-clause to sign a one-year, entry-level contract with the Edmonton Oilers of the National Hockey League (NHL).

Following the completion of his first season with the Oilers, on 21 August 2020, Nygård agreed to return to former Swedish club Färjestad BK on loan until the commencement of the delayed 2020–21 North American season.

=== Return to Färjestad ===
As a pending unrestricted free agent from the Oilers after two seasons, Nygård opted to return to the original club, Färjestad BK, agreeing on a five-year contract on 28 May 2021. in 2021–22 Nygård scored 41 points (16 goals / 25 assists) in 52 games and added 15 points (3 goals / 12 assists) in 19 playoff games as Färjestad won the Le Mat Trophy as Swedish Hockey League (SHL) champions.

== Career statistics ==
			Regular season					Playoffs
Season	Team	League	GP	G	A	Pts	PIM	GP	G	A	Pts	PIM
2009–10	Sunne IK	Div.1	1	0	0	0	0	—	—	—	—	—
2010–11	Sunne IK	Div.1	9	1	1	2	4	—	—	—	—	—
2011–12	Färjestad BK	J20	49	16	30	46	42	5	1	4	5	25
2012–13	Färjestad BK	J20	37	16	29	45	62	6	5	2	7	0
2012–13	Färjestad BK	SEL	28	1	1	2	31	4	0	0	0	0
2013–14	Färjestad BK	J20	6	6	5	11	0	—	—	—	—	—
2013–14	Färjestad BK	SHL	50	3	11	14	12	15	0	4	4	4
2014–15	Färjestad BK	SHL	44	9	5	14	10	3	1	0	1	0
2015–16	Färjestad BK	SHL	47	12	7	19	16	5	1	0	1	0
2016–17	Färjestad BK	SHL	52	16	13	29	26	7	0	3	3	2
2017–18	Färjestad BK	SHL	52	17	17	34	28	6	1	1	2	4
2018–19	Färjestad BK	SHL	52	21	14	35	20	14	5	5	10	6
2019–20	Edmonton Oilers	NHL	33	3	6	9	8	—	—	—	—	—
2020–21	Färjestad BK	SHL	15	7	3	10	6	—	—	—	—	—
2020–21	Edmonton Oilers	NHL	9	0	0	0	4	—	—	—	—	—
2021–22	Färjestad BK	SHL	52	16	25	41	30	19	3	12	15	6
2022–23	Färjestad BK	SHL	49	18	20	38	34	7	1	3	4	2
2023–24	Färjestad BK	SHL	50	14	23	37	24	4	0	2	2	0
2024–25	Färjestad BK	SHL	41	14	10	24	51	6	1	2	3	8
SHL totals			532	148	149	297	288	90	13	32	45	32
NHL totals			42	3	6	9	12	—	—	—	—	—

== Awards and honours ==
Award	Year
SHL
Le Mat Trophy (Färjestad BK)	2022
