= Widerstrom =

Widerstrom or Widerström is a surname. Notable people with the surname include:

- Jennifer Widerstrom (born 1982), American fitness model and personal trainer
- Karolina Widerström (1856–1949), Swedish doctor and gynecologist
- Pontus Widerström (born 1994), Swedish ice hockey player
