= Isac Brännström =

Swedish ice hockey player

- Born: 21 April 1998 (age 28) Stockholm, Sweden
- Height: 5 ft 10 in (178 cm)
- Weight: 176 lb (80 kg; 12 st 8 lb)
- Position: Forward
- Shoots: Left
- SHL team Former teams: HV71; Luleå HF
- Playing career: 2016–present

Isac Brännström (born 21 April 1998) is a Swedish professional ice hockey forward. He is currently playing with HV71 of the Swedish Hockey League (SHL). His younger brother, Erik Brännström, is a defenceman for the Rochester Americans of the American Hockey League (AHL).

== Playing career ==
Brännström played junior hockey with Swedish team HV71. In 2012–13, he debuted at the under-16 level, in the J16 SM. The following season he dressed for 26 U-18 games recording 29 goals and 28 assists. He also competed with a regional all-star team from Småland in the annual TV-pucken, an under-15 national tournament. After impressive seasons in the J20 SuperElit; Brännström logged his first minutes against Färjestad BK, in Sweden's top-flight SHL.

On 11 April 2019, Brännström left HV71 after three seasons in the SHL to sign as a free agent on a two-year contract with rival club, Luleå HF.

== Career statistics ==
			Regular season					Playoffs
Season	Team	League	GP	G	A	Pts	PIM	GP	G	A	Pts	PIM
2014–15	HV71	J20	10	1	1	2	6	1	0	0	0	0
2015–16	HV71	J20	32	4	10	14	20	3	0	2	2	2
2016–17	HV71	J20	36	15	25	40	57	7	5	4	9	6
2016–17	HV71	SHL	13	0	1	1	0	2	0	0	0	0
2016–17	Nybro Vikings IF	Div.1	1	0	1	1	0	—	—	—	—	—
2016–17	HV71	J20	12	5	8	13	8	2	0	2	2	0
2017–18	HV71	SHL	30	2	0	2	2	—	—	—	—	—
2017–18	Tingsryds AIF	Allsv	10	0	1	1	0	—	—	—	—	—
2018–19	HV71	SHL	50	6	4	10	8	9	2	4	6	2
2019–20	Luleå HF	SHL	52	9	9	18	22	—	—	—	—	—
2020–21	Luleå HF	SHL	46	10	10	22	20	7	1	1	2	2
2021–22	Luleå HF	SHL	52	13	11	24	6	17	4	4	8	6
2022–23	Luleå HF	SHL	47	13	16	29	24	10	0	3	3	10
2023–24	HV71	SHL	50	9	10	19	16	—	—	—	—	—
2024–25	HV71	SHL	48	2	12	14	6	—	—	—	—	—
SHL totals			388	64	75	139	104	45	7	12	19	20

== Awards and honors ==
Award	Year
SHL
Le Mat trophy (HV71)	2017
