= Oliver Tärnström =

Swedish ice hockey player

- Born: 30 August 2002 (age 24) Stockholm, Sweden
- Height: 6 ft 1 in (185 cm)
- Weight: 163 lb (74 kg; 11 st 9 lb)
- Position: Centre
- Shoots: Left
- Allsv team Former teams: AIK; Rögle BK
- NHL draft: 92nd overall, 2020; New York Rangers
- Playing career: 2019–present

Oliver Tärnström (born August 30, 2002) is a Swedish professional ice hockey centre who plays for AIK of the HockeyAllsvenskan (Allsv). Tärnström made his SHL debut for Rögle BK during the 2021–22 SHL season. He was drafted by the New York Rangers of the NHL in the third round of the 2020 NHL entry draft with the 92nd overall pick in the draft.

His father, Dick Tärnström was an ice hockey defenceman for AIK in the SHL as well as several NHL teams.
