= Albert Johansson =

Swedish ice hockey player (born 2001)

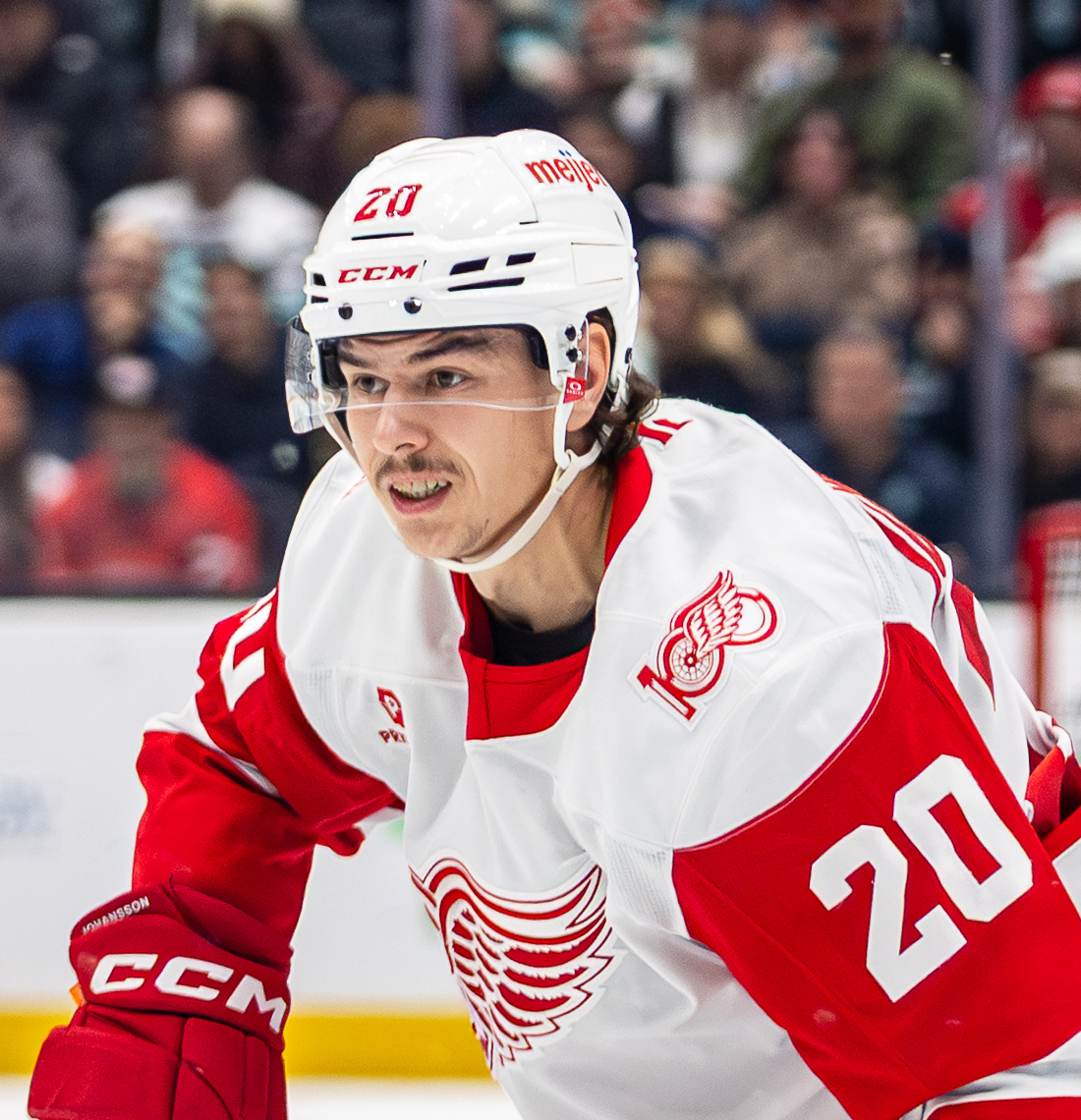
- Born: 4 January 2001 (age 25) Karlstad, Sweden
- Height: 6 ft 0 in (183 cm)
- Weight: 195 lb (88 kg; 13 st 13 lb)
- Position: Defence
- Shoots: Left
- NHL team Former teams: Detroit Red Wings; Färjestad BK
- National team: Sweden
- NHL draft: 60th overall, 2019; Detroit Red Wings
- Playing career: 2018–present

Albert Johansson (born 4 January 2001) is a Swedish professional ice hockey player who is a defenceman for the Detroit Red Wings of the National Hockey League (NHL).

== Playing career ==
He was drafted 60th overall by the Detroit Red Wings in the 2019 NHL entry draft. On 6 June 2020, Johansson was signed to a three-year, entry-level contract with the Red Wings. He was returned on loan by the Red Wings to continue his Swedish Hockey League (SHL) career with Färjestad BK for the 2021–22 season on 14 June 2021.

On 19 June 2024, the Red Wings signed Johansson to a one-year contract extension. He made his NHL debut for the Red Wings on 12 October. Johansson scored his first NHL goal on 10 January 2025, in a game against the Chicago Blackhawks, beating goaltender Petr Mrázek.

== International play ==
Medal record

Men's ice hockey

Representing Sweden

World U18 Championships
Gold medal – first place	2019 Sweden	

Johansson represented Sweden at the 2019 World U18 Championships and won a gold medal.

== Career statistics ==
=== Regular season and playoffs ===
			Regular season					Playoffs
Season	Team	League	GP	G	A	Pts	PIM	GP	G	A	Pts	PIM
2017–18	Färjestad BK	J20	9	1	3	4	2	—	—	—	—	—
2018–19	Färjestad BK	J20	40	5	24	29	63	2	0	0	0	0
2018–19	Färjestad BK	SHL	3	0	0	0	0	—	—	—	—	—
2019–20	Färjestad BK	J20	9	3	2	5	14	—	—	—	—	—
2019–20	Färjestad BK	SHL	42	2	11	13	4	—	—	—	—	—
2020–21	Färjestad BK	SHL	44	8	11	19	16	6	0	2	2	0
2021–22	Färjestad BK	SHL	52	5	20	25	24	19	2	6	8	8
2022–23	Grand Rapids Griffins	AHL	53	5	10	15	38	—	—	—	—	—
2023–24	Grand Rapids Griffins	AHL	66	6	15	21	46	9	0	3	3	8
2024–25	Detroit Red Wings	NHL	61	3	6	9	30	—	—	—	—	—
2025–26	Detroit Red Wings	NHL	82	3	8	11	16	—	—	—	—	—
SHL totals			141	15	42	57	44	25	2	8	10	8
NHL totals			143	6	14	20	46	—	—	—	—	—

=== International ===
Year	Team	Event	Result	GP	G	A	Pts	PIM
2018	Sweden	IH18	2nd place, silver medalist(s)	5	0	0	0	2
2019	Sweden	U18	1st place, gold medalist(s)	7	0	1	1	0
2021	Sweden	WJC	5th	5	0	3	3	4
2026	Sweden	WC	7th	8	0	1	1	6
Junior totals				17	0	4	4	6
Senior totals				8	0	1	1	6

== Awards and honours ==
Award	Year	Ref
SHL
Le Mat Trophy champion	2022	
