= Theodor Lennström =

Swedish ice hockey player (born 1994)

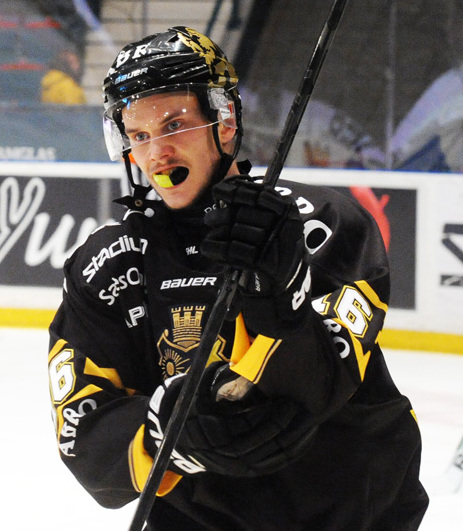
- Born: August 8, 1994 (age 30); Stockholm, Sweden
- Height: 6 ft 1 in (185 cm)
- Weight: 190 lb (86 kg; 13 st 8 lb)
- Position: Defence
- Shoots: Left
- SHL team Former teams: Linköping HC; AIK; Frölunda HC; Torpedo Nizhny Novgorod; Färjestad BK; Genève-Servette HC
- National team: Sweden
- NHL draft: Undrafted
- Playing career: 2013–present

Theodor Lennström (born August 8, 1994) is a Swedish professional ice hockey defenceman for Linköping HC of the Swedish Hockey League (SHL).

== Playing career ==
Undrafted, Lennström made his Swedish Hockey League debut playing with AIK IF during the 2013–14 SHL season.

Following his second season with Färjestad BK in 2018–19, Lennström left after his contract, signing a two-year deal with reigning champions, Frölunda HC on 8 May 2019. In the 2019–20 season, Lennström matched his previous season totals with three goals and 15 points in just 31 games before the season was abruptly ended due to COVID-19.

Attracting NHL interest, Lennström left the SHL to sign a one-year, entry-level contract with the Edmonton Oilers on 29 April 2020. With the pandemic delaying the 2020–21 North American season, Lennström opted to continue to play in Sweden on loan from the Oilers by returning to Frölunda HC on 21 July 2020. He produced four goals and 8 points in just 18 games before leaving the SHL and returning to the Oilers organization. Assigned to AHL affiliate, the Bakersfield Condors, Lennström made 19 appearances and collected 7 points in the regular season. He added three assists in the Pacific Conference Playoffs with the Condors before leaving the Oilers as a free agent.

On 3 August 2021, Lennström opted to continue his career in the Kontinental Hockey League (KHL), agreeing to a one-year contract with Russian club, Torpedo Nizhny Novgorod. In the 2021–22 season, Lennström registered nine goals and 18 assists for 27 points in 40 regular season games. Unable to help Torpedo qualify for the postseason for the first time in nine years, Lennström continued his season by returning to his former club, Färjestad BK of the SHL, on 12 February 2022.

As a free agent after two seasons with Genève-Servette HC of the National League (NL), Lennström returned to Sweden and the SHL after securing a three-year contract with Linköping HC on 5 May 2025.

== Career statistics ==
=== Regular season and playoffs ===
			Regular season					Playoffs
Season	Team	League	GP	G	A	Pts	PIM	GP	G	A	Pts	PIM
2010–11	AIK	J18	16	2	4	6	24	—	—	—	—	—
2010–11	AIK	J18 Allsv	12	1	5	6	47	6	2	1	3	0
2011–12	AIK	J18	14	3	11	14	18	—	—	—	—	—
2011–12	AIK	J18 Allsv	16	7	8	15	6	—	—	—	—	—
2012–13	AIK	J20	18	2	7	9	41	3	0	0	0	10
2013–14	AIK	J20	36	2	17	19	63	2	0	2	2	0
2013–14	AIK	SHL	26	1	2	3	2	—	—	—	—	—
2014–15	AIK	J20	8	2	5	7	4	—	—	—	—	—
2014–15	AIK	Allsv	33	0	1	1	22	—	—	—	—	—
2015–16	BIK Karlskoga	Allsv	50	1	11	12	30	5	2	4	6	0
2016–17	BIK Karlskoga	Allsv	48	11	15	26	36	10	2	3	5	18
2017–18	Färjestad BK	SHL	47	5	11	16	24	3	0	0	0	2
2018–19	Färjestad BK	SHL	47	2	13	15	34	14	0	1	1	6
2019–20	Frölunda HC	SHL	31	3	12	15	10	—	—	—	—	—
2020–21	Frölunda HC	SHL	18	4	4	8	8	—	—	—	—	—
2020–21	Bakersfield Condors	AHL	19	2	5	7	6	4	0	3	3	5
2021–22	Torpedo Nizhny Novgorod	KHL	40	9	18	27	14	—	—	—	—	—
2021–22	Färjestad BK	SHL	11	3	5	8	8	19	4	10	14	18
2022–23	Färjestad BK	SHL	34	13	18	31	18	3	0	1	1	8
2023–24	Genève-Servette HC	NL	17	2	9	11	4	2	1	0	1	4
2024–25	Genève-Servette HC	NL	41	4	19	23	55	—	—	—	—	—
SHL totals			214	31	65	96	104	39	4	12	16	34

=== International ===
Year	Team	Event	Result	GP	G	A	Pts	PIM
2022	Sweden	OG	4th	5	0	0	0	2
Senior totals				5	0	0	0	2

== Awards and honours ==
Award	Year
SHL
Le Mat Trophy (Färjestad BK)	2022
