= Daniel Viksten =

Swedish ice hockey player

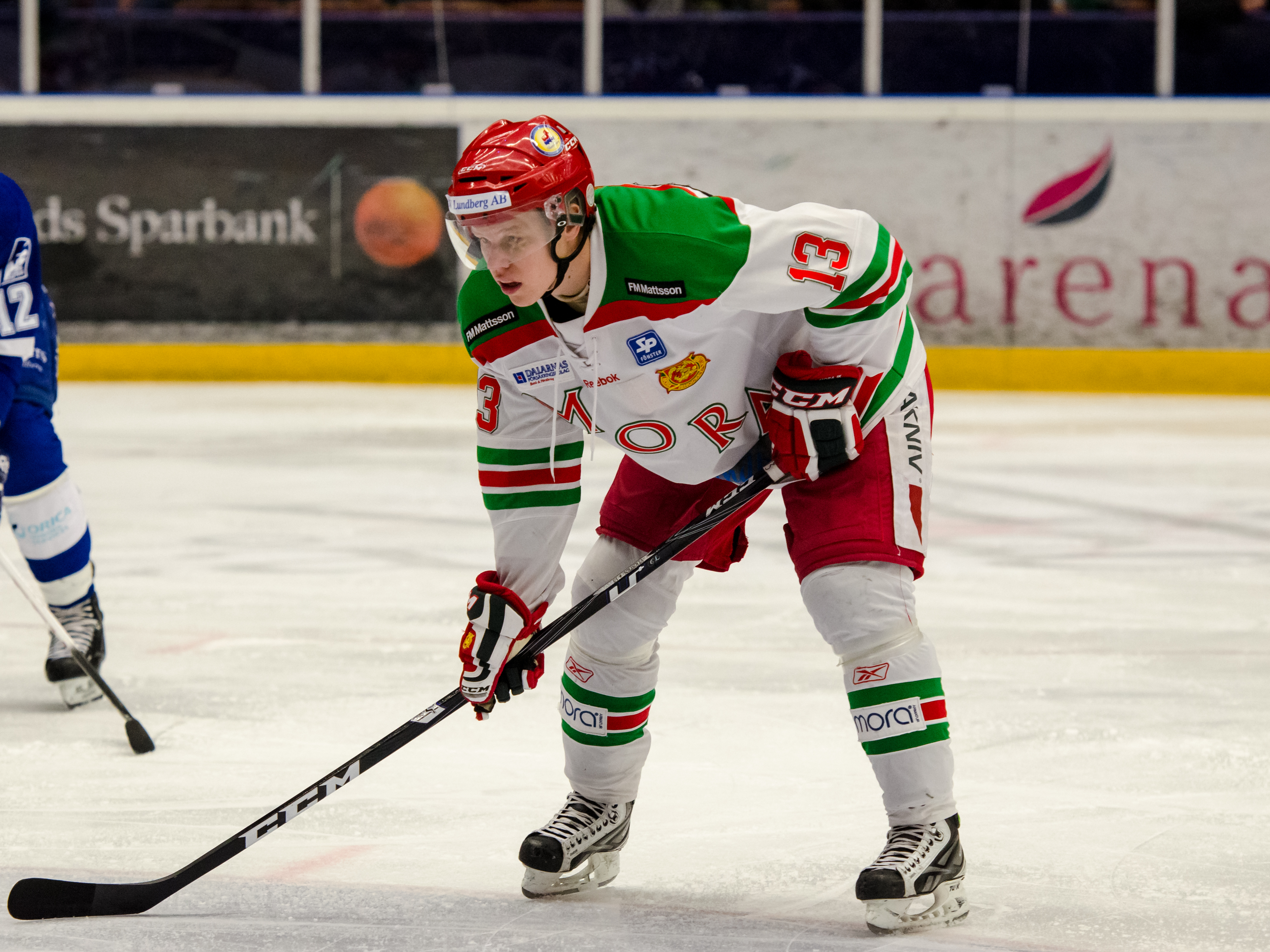
- Born: September 10, 1989 (age 36) Mora, Sweden
- Height: 1.81 m (5 ft 11 in)
- Weight: 78 kg (172 lb; 12 st 4 lb)
- Position: Right wing
- Shoots: Right
- Allsv team Former teams: IF Björklöven; Mora IK; Örebro HK; Färjestad BK; Graz99ers
- Playing career: 2007–present

Daniel Viksten (born 10 September 1989) is a Swedish professional ice hockey forward. He is currently playing for IF Björklöven in the HockeyAllsvenskan (Allsv).

He signed a two-year contract as a free agent with Färjestad BK of the Swedish Hockey League (SHL) on 6 April 2018.

== Awards and honours ==
Award	Year
SHL
Le Mat Trophy (Färjestad BK)	2022
