= Calle Clang =

Swedish ice hockey player (born 2002)

- Born: 20 May 2002 (age 24) Olofström, Sweden
- Height: 6 ft 2 in (188 cm)
- Weight: 194 lb (88 kg; 13 st 12 lb)
- Position: Goaltender
- Catches: Left
- SHL team: Rögle BK
- NHL draft: 77th overall, 2020; Pittsburgh Penguins
- Playing career: 2020–present

Calle Clang (born 20 May 2002) is a Swedish professional ice hockey goaltender who currently plays for Rögle BK of the Swedish Hockey League (SHL). Clang was selected by the Pittsburgh Penguins in the third round of the 2020 NHL entry draft.

== Playing career ==
Clang played as a youth within Swedish club, Rögle BK. He made his professional debut with Kristianstads IK in the HockeyAllsvenskan (Allsv) during the 2020–21 season while on loan from Rögle BK. He made his Swedish Hockey League (SHL) debut, appearing in relief in one game during the campaign.

Clang’s NHL rights were held by the Penguins until 21 March 2022, when Clang, along with forwards Zach Aston-Reese and Dominik Simon, and a second-round pick in the 2022 NHL entry draft, was traded by Pittsburgh to the Anaheim Ducks in exchange for forward Rickard Rakell at the trade deadline.

On 5 May 2022, Clang was signed to a three-year entry-level contract by the Anaheim Ducks. He was returned on loan to Rögle BK to continue his development in the SHL in the 2022–23 season.

During the 2023–24 season, on 8 December 2023, Clang was recalled by Anaheim while goaltender John Gibson was placed on the non-roster list. Gibson was with his wife as she gave birth to a child. Clang did not feature with the Ducks during his recall before he was returned to the San Diego Gulls for the remainder of the season.

At the conclusion of his entry-level contract with the Ducks, Clang as a pending restricted free agent, Clang opted to return to his original Swedish club in signing a two-year contract with Rögle BK on 15 June 2026.

== Career statistics ==
=== Regular season and playoffs ===
			Regular season									Playoffs
Season	Team	League	GP	W	L	T	MIN	GA	SO	GAA	SV%	GP	W	L	MIN	GA	SO	GAA	SV%
2016–17	Olofströms IK	Div.2	1	1	0	0	60	1	0	1.00	.955	—	—	—	—	—	—	—	—
2018–19	Rögle BK	J20	24	12	11	0	1336	63	3	2.83	.907	2	0	2	118	9	0	4.58	.866
2019–20	Rögle BK	J20	34	17	17	0	2042	90	2	2.64	.913	—	—	—	—	—	—	—	—
2020–21	Kristianstads IK	Allsv	32	13	19	0	1924	79	0	2.46	.919	—	—	—	—	—	—	—	—
2020–21	Rögle BK	SHL	1	0	0	0	1	0	0	0.00	1.000	—	—	—	—	—	—	—	—
2021–22	Rögle BK	SHL	17	10	5	0	949	36	1	2.28	.915	3	2	1	179	6	0	2.01	.912
2022–23	Rögle BK	SHL	25	12	10	0	1382	62	1	2.69	.901	—	—	—	—	—	—	—	—
2022–23	San Diego Gulls	AHL	5	1	3	0	249	11	0	2.65	.904	—	—	—	—	—	—	—	—
2023–24	San Diego Gulls	AHL	32	10	16	4	1830	98	0	3.21	.897	—	—	—	—	—	—	—	—
2023–24	Tulsa Oilers	ECHL	2	1	1	0	117	4	0	2.05	.931	—	—	—	—	—	—	—	—
2024–25	San Diego Gulls	AHL	31	11	13	4	1611	85	0	3.17	.895	—	—	—	—	—	—	—	—
2025–26	San Diego Gulls	AHL	36	18	9	6	2037	95	3	2.80	.897	—	—	—	—	—	—	—	—
SHL totals			43	22	15	0	2,332	98	2	2.52	.906	3	2	1	179	6	0	2.01	.912

Medal record

Representing Sweden

Ice hockey

World Junior Championships
Bronze medal – third place	2022 Canada	

=== International ===
Year	Team	Event	Result	GP	W	L	T	MIN	GA	SO	GAA	SV%
2018	Sweden	U17	3rd place, bronze medalist(s)	1	0	1	0	60	3	0	3.00	.897
2019	Sweden	U18	1st place, gold medalist(s)	—	—	—	—	—	—	—	—	—
2019	Sweden	IH18	3rd place, bronze medalist(s)	2	2	0	0	120	3	0	1.50	.953
2021	Sweden	WJC	5th	—	—	—	—	—	—	—	—	—
2022	Sweden	WJC	3rd place, bronze medalist(s)	2	2	0	0	120	2	1	1.00	.944
Junior totals				5	4	1	0	300	8	1	1.60	.946
