= Max Véronneau =

Canadian ice hockey player

- Born: December 12, 1995 (age 30) Ottawa, Ontario, Canada
- Height: 6 ft 1 in (185 cm)
- Weight: 190 lb (86 kg; 13 st 8 lb)
- Position: Right wing
- Shoots: Right
- SHL team Former teams: Leksands IF; Ottawa Senators; IK Oskarshamn
- NHL draft: Undrafted
- Playing career: 2019–present

Maximilian Cross Véronneau is a Canadian professional ice hockey forward who is currently playing with Leksands IF of the Swedish Hockey League (SHL). Véronneau played junior ice hockey in his hometown of Ottawa, then joined the Princeton University Tigers. After completing his senior season at Princeton, he signed as a free agent with the Ottawa Senators of the NHL.

== Playing career ==
After playing junior 'A' ice hockey in Ottawa, Ontario, with the Gloucester Rangers, Véronneau entered Princeton University in 2015. In his junior year 2017–18, Véronneau placed second in NCAA Division 1 scoring 17 goals and 38 assists for 55 points in 36 games. In 2017, Véronneau attended the Vegas Golden Knights' development camp. After four seasons with the Princeton Tigers, Véronneau was regarded as one of the top NCAA free agents. He signed as a free agent with his hometown Senators in March 2019, signing a two-year entry-level contract. He made his NHL debut on March 14, 2019, against the St. Louis Blues. Véronneau was named the third star of the game. He finished his first season with the Senators playing in 12 games and scoring two goals and four points.

At the beginning of the 2019–20 season, Véronneau was assigned to Ottawa's American Hockey League (AHL) affiliate, the Belleville Senators. He struggled in the AHL but was recalled on November 18, 2019. Véronneau was sent back to Belleville on November 28 after playing in four games with Ottawa. He was traded to the Toronto Maple Leafs on February 19, 2020, in exchange for Aaron Luchuk and a conditional 6th round draft pick (depending on how many games Véronneau played for the Maple Leafs). He played in just three regular season games with AHL affiliate, the Toronto Marlies, before the season was abandoned due to the COVID-19 pandemic.

As a free agent from the Maple Leafs, and with the 2020–21 North American season delayed due to the pandemic, Véronneau opted to sign his first contract abroad in agreeing to a contract for the remainder of the season with Swedish club, IK Oskarshamn of the Swedish Hockey League (SHL), on December 21, 2020. In the top Swedish tier, Véronneau regained his offensive confidence, potting 12 goals through 25 regular season games with IK Oskarshamn.

On April 21, 2021, Véronneau opted to transfer to fellow SHL club, Leksands IF, agreeing to a two-year contract. In the following 2021–22 season, he established himself as one of the top offensive players in the SHL, and was signed to a further one-year extension with Leksands through 2024 during the season on November 20, 2021. He completed the season, leading the league with 34 goals through 51 games and was named the SHL's most valuable player.

On April 14, 2022, Véronneau used his NHL out clause to sign a one-year, two-way contract with the San Jose Sharks. Véronneau was assigned to begin the 2022–23 season with AHL affiliate, the San Jose Barracuda. He was never recalled by the Sharks with his season largely affected by injury and limiting Véronneau to just 1 goal and 9 points through 31 regular season games.

As a pending free agent, Véronneau opted to return to Sweden and resume his contract with Leksands IF of the SHL on May 18, 2023.

== Personal ==
Véronneau's parents are Marc Véronneau and Pamela Cross. Véronneau's sister Sophie plays ice hockey for Yale University. Véronneau is a graduate of École secondaire catholique Franco-Cité in Ottawa, where he also played football and lacrosse.

== Career statistics ==
			Regular season					Playoffs
Season	Team	League	GP	G	A	Pts	PIM	GP	G	A	Pts	PIM
2012–13	Ottawa Canadians	EOJHL	58	37	49	86	8	—	—	—	—	—
2012–13	Gloucester Rangers	CCHL	4	1	2	3	0	—	—	—	—	—
2013–14	Gloucester Rangers	CCHL	61	41	39	80	10	—	—	—	—	—
2014–15	Gloucester Rangers	CCHL	27	14	22	36	6	6	3	1	4	0
2015–16	Princeton University	ECAC	30	11	6	17	2	—	—	—	—	—
2016–17	Princeton University	ECAC	33	11	24	35	4	—	—	—	—	—
2017–18	Princeton University	ECAC	36	17	38	55	12	—	—	—	—	—
2018–19	Princeton University	ECAC	31	13	24	37	2	—	—	—	—	—
2018–19	Ottawa Senators	NHL	12	2	2	4	0	—	—	—	—	—
2019–20	Belleville Senators	AHL	33	5	5	10	2	—	—	—	—	—
2019–20	Ottawa Senators	NHL	4	0	0	0	0	—	—	—	—	—
2019–20	Toronto Marlies	AHL	3	0	0	0	2	—	—	—	—	—
2020–21	IK Oskarshamn	SHL	25	12	6	18	8	—	—	—	—	—
2021–22	Leksands IF	SHL	51	34	26	60	14	—	—	—	—	—
2022–23	San Jose Barracuda	AHL	31	1	8	9	4	—	—	—	—	—
2023–24	Leksands IF	SHL	50	17	19	36	6	7	2	2	4	0
2024–25	Leksands IF	SHL	51	12	16	28	8	—	—	—	—	—
NHL totals			16	2	2	4	0	—	—	—	—	—
SHL totals			177	75	67	142	36	7	2	2	4	0

== Awards and honours ==
Award	Year
College
All-ECAC Second All-Star team	2017
All-ECAC First All-Star team	2018
AHCA East All-American team	2018
SHL
Guldhjälmen (MVP)	2022
Håkan Loob Trophy (Most Goals)	2022
