= Einar Emanuelsson =

Swedish ice hockey player (born 1997)

- Born: April 3, 1997 (age 28) Kiruna, Sweden
- Height: 5 ft 10 in (178 cm)
- Weight: 183 lb (83 kg; 13 st 1 lb)
- Position: Forward
- Shoots: Right
- SHL team: Luleå HF
- Playing career: 2014–present

Einar Emanuelsson (born April 3, 1997) is a Swedish professional ice hockey player. He is currently playing with Luleå HF of the Swedish Hockey League (SHL).

Emanuelsson played his first game with Luleå HF during the 2013-14 European Trophy playoffs, and made his Swedish Hockey League regular season debut during the 2014–15 SHL season.

== Awards and honours ==
Award	Year
SHL
Le Mat Trophy (Luleå HF)	2025
