= Gustav Rydahl =

Swedish professional ice hockey centre (born 1994)

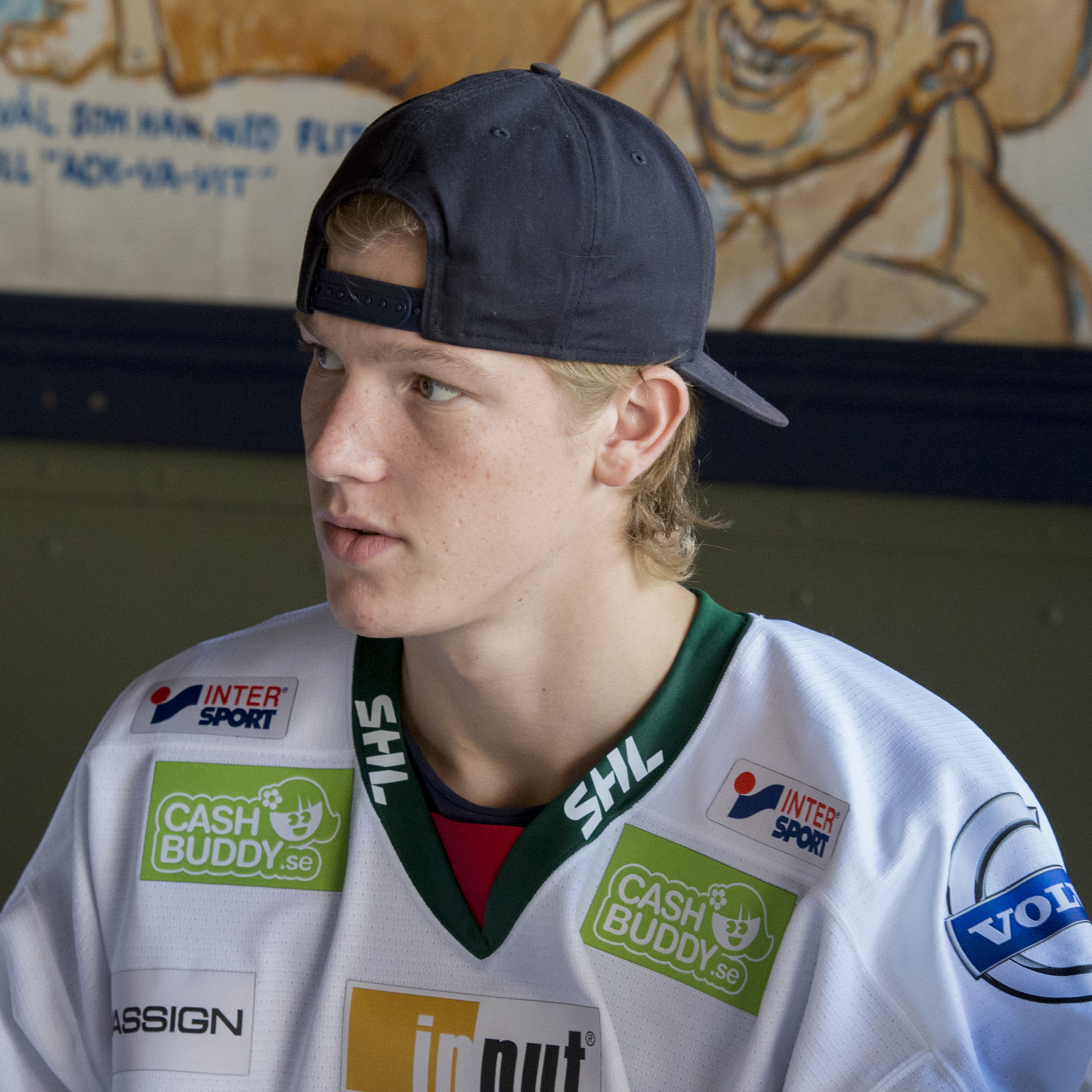
- Born: September 11, 1994 (age 31) Karlstad, Sweden
- Height: 6 ft 3 in (191 cm)
- Weight: 198 lb (90 kg; 14 st 2 lb)
- Position: Centre
- Shoots: Left
- SHL team Former teams: Frölunda HC; Växjö Lakers; Luleå HF; Färjestad BK
- National team: Sweden
- NHL draft: Undrafted
- Playing career: 2011–present

Gustav Rydahl (born September 11, 1994) is a Swedish professional ice hockey centre for Frölunda HC of the Swedish Hockey League (SHL).

== Playing career ==
Rydahl played in the youth ranks with Färjestads BK before moving to Frölunda HC in 2011. He made his Elitserien debut on October 9, 2012, at Timrå IK. He scored his first Elitserien goal on January 12, 2013, against HV71's Gustaf Wesslau in a 3–4 shootout loss in Scandinavium.

Rydahl signed with the Växjö Lakers in 2014 and helped the team win the Swedish championship in his first year, making 62 SHL appearances with five goals that season. After two years with the Lakers, he agreed to terms with fellow SHL outfit Luleå HF in May 2016.

Having claimed the Swedish championship with Färjestad BK in the 2021–22 season, Rydahl left the SHL as a free agent and was signed to a one-year, $750,000 contract with the New York Rangers of the NHL on June 13, 2022.

Rydahl started the 2022–23 season with the Rangers' American Hockey League affiliate, the Hartford Wolf Pack, but was called up to the Rangers on January 5, 2023. He did not play in the Rangers' January 5 game and was returned to Hartford afterward. Rydahl contributed with seven goals and 15 points through 40 games with the Wolf Pack before he was traded by the Rangers to the Colorado Avalanche in exchange for forward Anton Blidh on March 3. Acquired to add center depth for the Avalanche affiliate, the Colorado Eagles, Rydahl played out the remainder of his contract in the AHL, posting 2 goals in 12 regular season games before appearing in 3 playoff contests with the Eagles.

As a pending free agent from the Avalanche, Rydahl opted to resume his career in his homeland, signing a five-year contract with his original SHL club, Frölunda HC, on 11 May 2023.

== Career statistics ==
=== Regular season and playoffs ===
			Regular season					Playoffs
Season	Team	League	GP	G	A	Pts	PIM	GP	G	A	Pts	PIM
2009–10	Färjestad BK	J18	6	0	1	1	2	—	—	—	—	—
2009–10	Färjestad BK	J18 Allsv	12	0	2	2	0	7	0	0	0	0
2010–11	Färjestad BK	J18	19	8	9	17	26	—	—	—	—	—
2010–11	Färjestad BK	J18 Allsv	18	2	5	7	18	—	—	—	—	—
2010–11	Skåre BK	SWE.3	4	0	0	0	0	—	—	—	—	—
2011–12	Frölunda HC	J18 Allsv	3	1	1	2	0	4	3	2	5	4
2011–12	Frölunda HC	J20	46	8	21	29	50	1	0	0	0	0
2012–13	Frölunda HC	J20	19	4	8	12	51	3	0	1	1	6
2012–13	Frölunda HC	SEL	31	1	1	2	10	5	0	0	0	10
2013–14	Frölunda HC	J20	1	0	0	0	0	3	0	1	1	0
2013–14	Frölunda HC	SHL	22	1	0	1	14	—	—	—	—	—
2013–14	Mora IK	Allsv	23	4	2	6	28	6	0	0	0	4
2014–15	Växjö Lakers	SHL	44	5	0	5	43	18	0	0	0	0
2015–16	Växjö Lakers	SHL	51	7	2	9	10	10	0	1	1	8
2016–17	Luleå HF	SHL	25	1	0	1	20	—	—	—	—	—
2017–18	Luleå HF	SHL	42	1	1	2	39	—	—	—	—	—
2017–18	Färjestad BK	SHL	7	2	0	2	2	6	0	0	0	8
2018–19	Färjestad BK	SHL	47	12	7	19	28	14	2	5	7	4
2019–20	Färjestad BK	SHL	49	19	16	35	50	—	—	—	—	—
2020–21	Färjestad BK	SHL	9	0	2	2	8	6	0	2	2	2
2021–22	Färjestad BK	SHL	44	15	15	30	53	19	6	6	12	23
2022–23	Hartford Wolf Pack	AHL	40	7	8	15	32	—	—	—	—	—
2022–23	Colorado Eagles	AHL	12	2	1	3	8	3	1	0	1	4
2023–24	Frölunda HC	SHL	24	3	3	6	27	—	—	—	—	—
2024–25	Frölunda HC	SHL	4	0	0	0	0	—	—	—	—	—
2025–26	Frölunda HC	SHL	—	—	—	—	—	—	—	—	—	—
SHL totals			399	67	47	114	304	78	8	14	22	55

=== International ===
Year	Team	Event	Result	GP	G	A	Pts	PIM
2011	Sweden	IH18	2nd place, silver medalist(s)	5	0	0	0	4
2022	Sweden	OG	4th	5	0	0	0	0
Junior totals				5	0	0	0	4
Senior totals				5	0	0	0	0

== Awards and honors ==
Award	Year
SHL
Le Mat Trophy champion	2015, 2022
