= Filip Johansson (ice hockey) =

Swedish ice hockey player (born 2000)

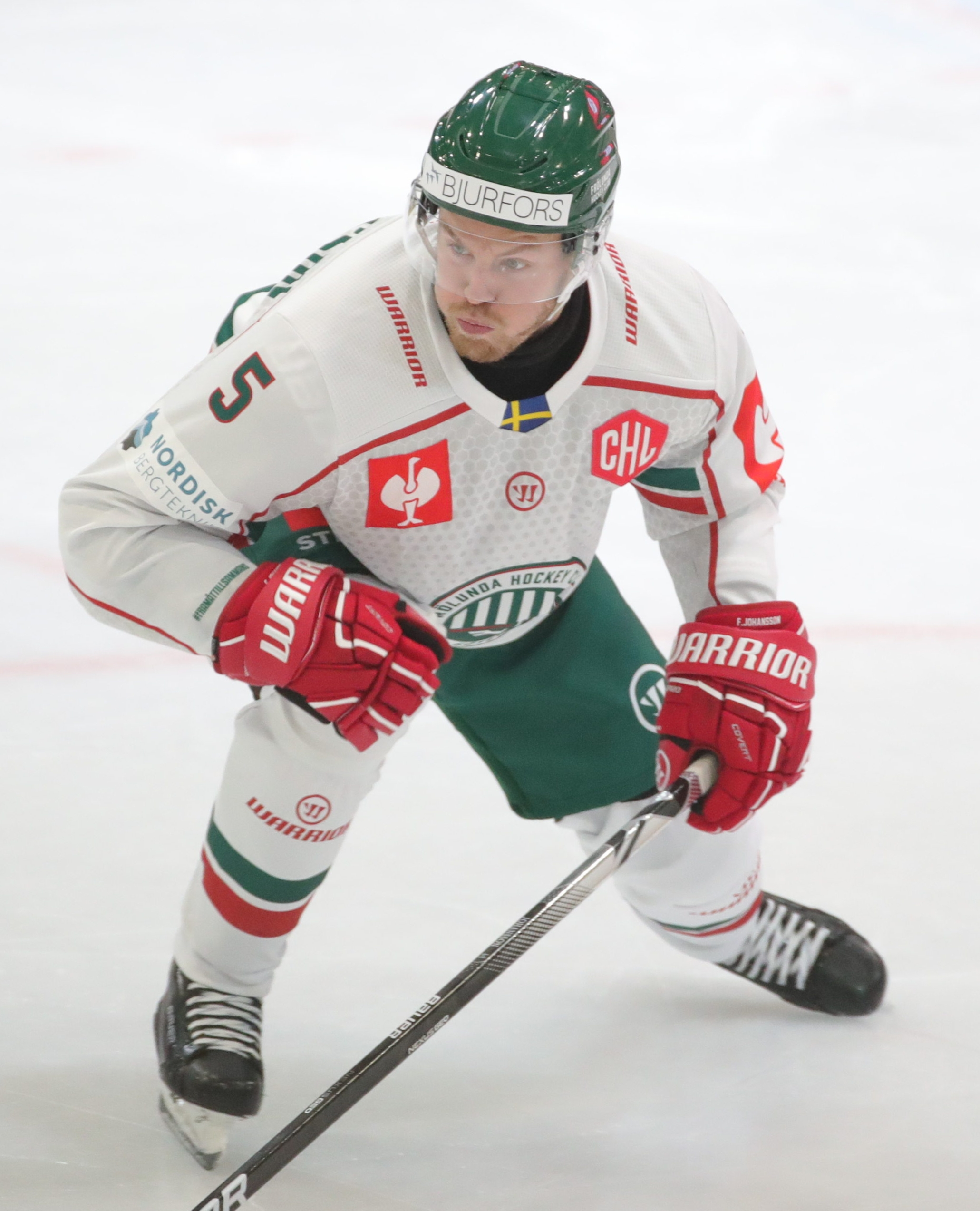
- Born: 23 March 2000 (age 26) Västerås, Sweden
- Height: 6 ft 1 in (185 cm)
- Weight: 176 lb (80 kg; 12 st 8 lb)
- Position: Defence
- Shoots: Right
- SHL team Former teams: Rögle BK; Leksands IF; Frölunda HC
- NHL draft: 24th overall, 2018; Minnesota Wild
- Playing career: 2017–present

Filip Johansson (born 23 March 2000) is a Swedish professional ice hockey defenceman for Rögle BK of the Swedish Hockey League (SHL).

== Playing career ==
Johansson made his professional debut with Leksands IF in the HockeyAllsvenskan, after developing through their junior ranks, in the 2017–18 season.

On 23 June 2018, Johansson was selected by the Minnesota Wild in the first round, 24th overall, of the 2018 NHL entry draft.

On 25 March 2020, Johansson left Leksands IF after five seasons within the organization by agreeing to a two-year contract with Frölunda HC.

With the Wild opting not to sign Johansson before his drafts rights expired, he was later signed as a free agent to a two-year, entry-level contract with the Vancouver Canucks on 13 June 2022. He would continue his tenure with Frölunda HC on loan from the Canucks for the 2022–23 season.

At the conclusion of his contract with the Canucks, as a pending restricted free agent, Johansson opted to return to his native Sweden in signing a two-year contract to continue in the SHL with Rögle BK on 16 May 2024.

== Career statistics ==
=== Regular season and playoffs ===
			Regular season					Playoffs
Season	Team	League	GP	G	A	Pts	PIM	GP	G	A	Pts	PIM
2016–17	Leksands IF	J20	34	4	4	8	24	2	0	0	0	0
2017–18	Leksands IF	J20	29	4	5	9	12	—	—	—	—	—
2017–18	Leksands IF	Allsv	23	1	0	1	4	11	2	3	5	4
2018–19	Leksands IF	Allsv	47	1	3	4	28	12	1	2	3	12
2019–20	Leksands IF	SHL	39	2	2	4	14	—	—	—	—	—
2019–20	Leksands IF	J20	3	1	1	2	4	—	—	—	—	—
2020–21	Frölunda HC	SHL	46	6	5	11	12	2	0	0	0	0
2021–22	Frölunda HC	SHL	47	3	8	11	8	9	5	2	7	0
2022–23	Frölunda HC	SHL	51	5	16	21	8	12	2	3	5	4
2022–23	Abbotsford Canucks	AHL	—	—	—	—	—	3	0	0	0	0
2023–24	Abbotsford Canucks	AHL	55	5	13	18	10	6	0	1	1	2
2024–25	Rögle BK	SHL	51	8	9	17	16	2	0	0	0	2
SHL totals			234	24	40	64	58	25	7	5	12	6

Medal record

Representing Sweden

Ice hockey

IIHF World U18 Championship
Bronze medal – third place	2018 Russia	

=== International ===
Year	Team	Event	Result	GP	G	A	Pts	PIM
2016	Sweden	U17	1st place, gold medalist(s)	6	0	3	3	10
2017	Sweden	IH18	3rd place, bronze medalist(s)	5	1	3	4	4
2018	Sweden	U18	3rd place, bronze medalist(s)	7	1	1	2	2
Junior totals				18	2	7	9	16

Awards and achievements
Preceded by Luke Kunin	Minnesota Wild first-round draft pick 2018	Succeeded by Matthew Boldy
