= Kim Roussakoff =

Swedish ice hockey player

- Born: January 4, 1996 (age 29); Gothenburg, Sweden
- Height: 5 ft 11 in (180 cm)
- Weight: 174 lb (79 kg; 12 st 6 lb)
- Position: Defence
- Shoots: Right
- SHL team: Frölunda HC
- NHL draft: Undrafted
- Playing career: 2015–present

Kim Roussakoff (born January 4, 1996) is a Swedish ice hockey defenceman. He is currently playing with Frölunda HC of the Swedish Hockey League (SHL).

Roussakoff made his Swedish Hockey League debut playing with Frölunda HC during the 2014–15 SHL season.
