= Anton Blidh =

Swedish ice hockey player (born 1995)

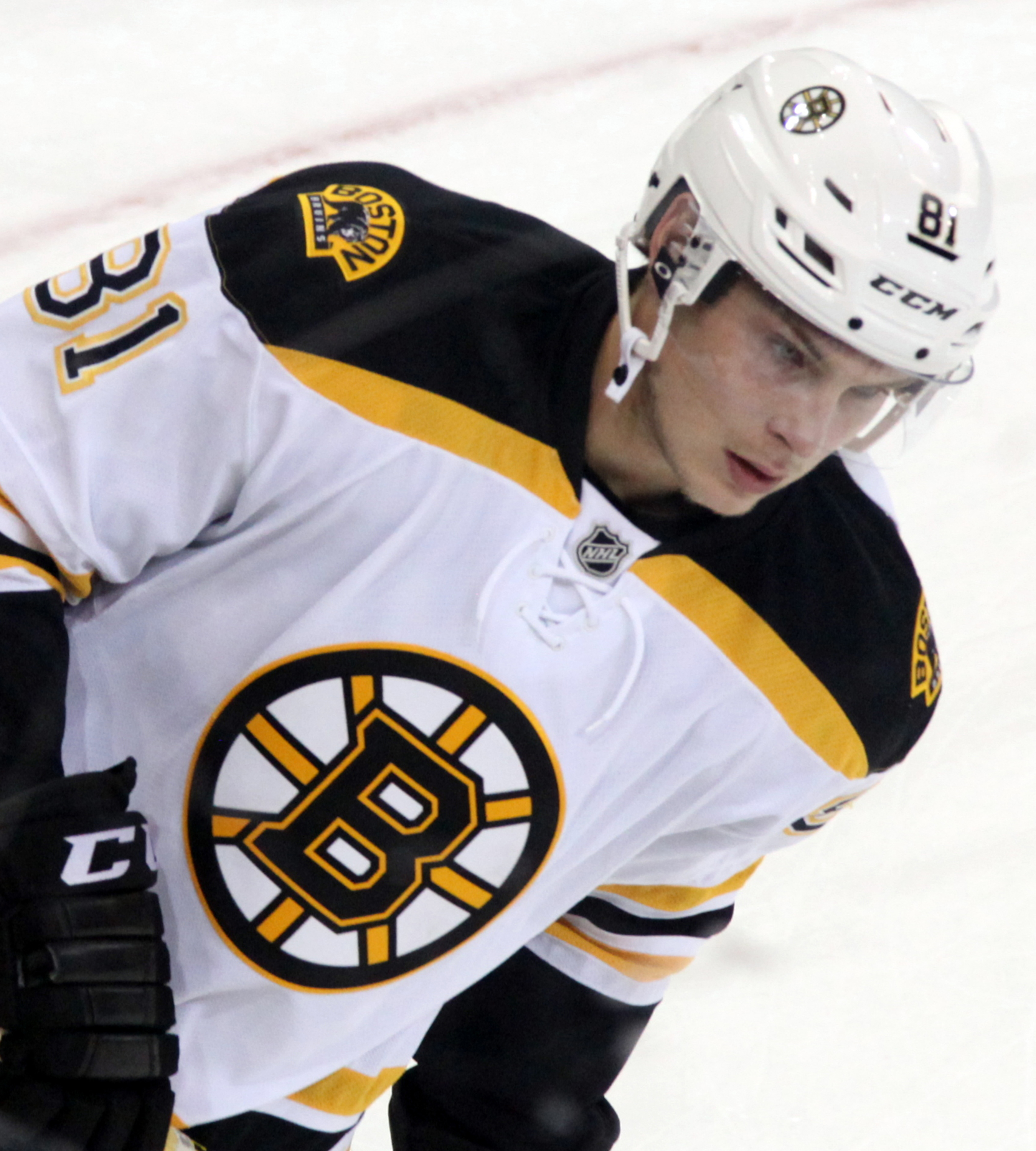
- Blidh with the Boston Bruins in 2015
- Born: 14 March 1995 (age 31) Mölnlycke, Sweden
- Height: 6 ft 1 in (185 cm)
- Weight: 201 lb (91 kg; 14 st 5 lb)
- Position: Forward
- Shoots: Left
- NHL team (P) Cur. team Former teams: New York Rangers; Hartford Wolf Pack (AHL); Frölunda HC; Boston Bruins; Colorado Avalanche
- NHL draft: 180th overall, 2013; Boston Bruins
- Playing career: 2013–present

Anton Blidh (born 14 March 1995) is a Swedish professional ice hockey forward for the Hartford Wolf Pack of the American Hockey League (AHL) while under contract to the New York Rangers of the National Hockey League (NHL). Blidh was selected by the Boston Bruins in the sixth round (180th overall) of the 2013 NHL entry draft.

== Playing career ==
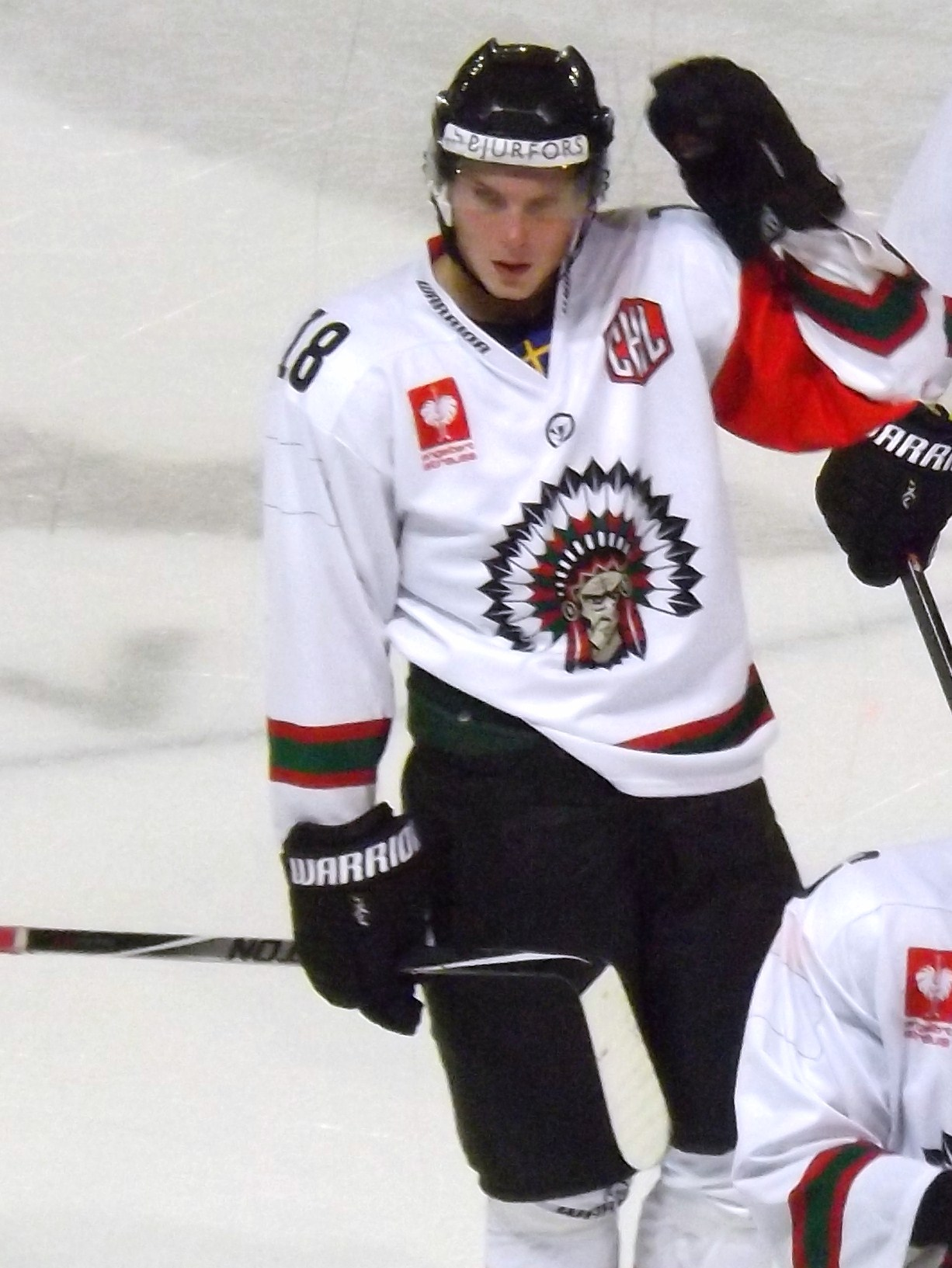
Blidh playing with Frölunda HC in 2014

Growing up in Sweden, Blidh split time between the Frolunda U-18 team and Frolunda junior team during the 2012-2013 season. After recording 17 goals and 10 assists in 43 games for the Frolunda junior team, Blidh was drafted in the sixth round, 180th overall, by the Boston Bruins in the 2013 NHL entry draft. Following the draft, Blidh made his Swedish Hockey League debut playing with Frölunda HC during the 2013–14 SHL season. He played with the Frölunda HC until 2015, accumulating 10 points through 72 games and 28 penalty minutes. On 29 May 2015, Blidh signed a three-year entry-level contract with the Bruins after appearing in two of their development camps.

=== Boston Bruins ===
Upon joining the Bruins organisation in North America, Blidh was assigned to their American Hockey League (AHL) affiliate, the Providence Bruins for the 2015–16 season. In his first season with the team, Blidh recorded 10 goals and four assists through 65 games.

The following season, Blidh was re-assigned to the Providence Bruins to begin the 2016–17 season. He played 19 games, producing five goals and four assists in Providence, before being recalled to the NHL level on 2 December 2016. He made his NHL debut the following game in a 2–1 road game win over the Buffalo Sabres, achieving three shots on goal and four hits in his 10:12 of on-ice time. Following this, he scored his first career goal with the Bruins in a home-game loss to the New York Islanders on 20 December 2016. During a game against the Nashville Predators, Blidh recorded a hard hit against Roman Josi which resulted in a major penalty for interference and caused Josi to be placed on injured reserve. Blidh was eventually returned to Providence again on 21 January 2017 after skating in 19 games and posting one goal and one assist with seven penalty minutes.

During the 2017–18 season, Blidh set new career-highs in Providence with 11 goals and 15 assists for 26 points through 71 games. He spent the majority of the season in the AHL, making only one NHL appearance on March 19 against the Columbus Blue Jackets. As a result of his play, Blidh signed a one-year, two-way contract with an NHL cap hit of $650,000. Following the signing, he was again returned to Providence and only played in one NHL game during a 6–3 loss against the Tampa Bay Lightning on 6 April. While in the AHL, he played in 74 games and scored 10 goals and 13 assists for 23 points. On 1 May 2019, Blidh signed a two-year, two-way contract extension with the Bruins.

Blidh appeared in 10 total games for Boston during the shortened 2020–21 season, recording one goal. On 17 July 2021, the Bruins signed Blidh to a one-year, two-way contract with an NHL cap hit of $750,000. In his seventh year with the Bruins in the 2021–22 season, Blidh played the full season in Boston, appearing in a career-high 32 games, recording 2 goals and 9 points in a depth forward role.

=== Colorado Avalanche ===
As a free agent from the Bruins, Blidh was signed to a one-year, two-way contract with the Colorado Avalanche, on 3 August 2022. After a successful training camp and pre-season, Blidh made the Avalanche opening season roster for the 2022–23 season. After serving as an healthy scratch, Blidh was re-assigned to begin his year with AHL affiliate, the Colorado Eagles, before shortly returning to the Avalanche and making his debut in a 4–3 overtime defeat to the Winnipeg Jets on 19 October 2022. Blidh went scoreless through 14 games with the Avalanche over the first half of the season before returning to the Eagles.

=== New York Rangers ===
On 3 March 2023, Blidh was traded by the Avalanche to the New York Rangers in exchange for fellow Swedish forward Gustav Rydahl. Assigned directly to AHL affiliate, the Hartford Wolf Pack, Blidh increased his offensive output, in recording 7 goals and 11 points in 17 regular season games. In the post-season, Blidh finished third in team scoring in notching 7 points through 9 playoff contests.

On 8 June 2023, Blidh opted to forgo free agency in agreeing to a two-year, two-way contract extension with the Rangers.

== Career statistics ==
=== Regular season and playoffs ===
			Regular season					Playoffs
Season	Team	League	GP	G	A	Pts	PIM	GP	G	A	Pts	PIM
2012–13	Frölunda HC	J20	43	17	10	27	80	6	1	2	3	0
2013–14	Frölunda HC	J20	27	11	14	25	20	—	—	—	—	—
2013–14	Frölunda HC	SHL	24	0	5	5	2	6	1	2	3	0
2013–14	Karlskrona HK	Allsv	11	1	1	2	6	—	—	—	—	—
2014–15	Frölunda HC	J20	1	1	1	2	2	—	—	—	—	—
2014–15	Frölunda HC	SHL	48	5	0	5	26	13	1	0	1	4
2015–16	Providence Bruins	AHL	65	10	4	14	48	—	—	—	—	—
2016–17	Providence Bruins	AHL	53	10	6	16	41	17	1	0	1	6
2016–17	Boston Bruins	NHL	19	1	1	2	7	—	—	—	—	—
2017–18	Providence Bruins	AHL	71	11	15	26	36	4	2	0	2	6
2017–18	Boston Bruins	NHL	1	0	0	0	0	—	—	—	—	—
2018–19	Providence Bruins	AHL	74	10	13	23	94	4	1	1	2	2
2018–19	Boston Bruins	NHL	1	0	0	0	0	—	—	—	—	—
2019–20	Providence Bruins	AHL	4	2	0	2	14	—	—	—	—	—
2019–20	Boston Bruins	NHL	7	0	0	0	0	—	—	—	—	—
2020–21	Boston Bruins	NHL	10	1	0	1	6	—	—	—	—	—
2020–21	Providence Bruins	AHL	11	3	4	7	14	—	—	—	—	—
2021–22	Boston Bruins	NHL	32	2	7	9	24	—	—	—	—	—
2022–23	Colorado Eagles	AHL	36	6	6	12	48	—	—	—	—	—
2022–23	Colorado Avalanche	NHL	14	0	0	0	4	—	—	—	—	—
2022–23	Hartford Wolf Pack	AHL	17	7	4	11	10	9	2	5	7	4
2023–24	Hartford Wolf Pack	AHL	64	7	10	17	77	10	2	0	2	14
2023–24	New York Rangers	NHL	1	0	0	0	2	—	—	—	—	—
2024–25	Hartford Wolf Pack	AHL	71	19	17	36	109	—	—	—	—	—
2025–26	Hartford Wolf Pack	AHL	64	6	6	12	56	—	—	—	—	—
2025–26	New York Rangers	NHL	4	0	1	1	0	—	—	—	—	—
SHL totals			72	5	5	10	28	19	2	2	4	4
NHL totals			88	4	9	13	43	—	—	—	—	—

=== International ===
Year	Team	Event	Result	GP	G	A	Pts	PIM
2013	Sweden	U18	5th	5	1	0	1	0
2015	Sweden	WJC	4th	7	1	2	3	4
Junior totals				12	2	2	4	4
