= Nils Lagerlöf =

Swedish ice hockey player

- Born: August 14, 1995 (age 30) Karlskrona, Sweden
- Height: 6 ft 3 in (191 cm)
- Weight: 209 lb (95 kg; 14 st 13 lb)
- Position: Defence
- Shot: Left
- Played for: Frölunda HC
- NHL draft: Undrafted
- Playing career: 2013–2016

Nils Lagerlöf (born August 14, 1995) is a Swedish former professional ice hockey defenceman. He last played for the Kallinge-Ronneby IF of the Hockeyettan.

Lagerlöf made his Swedish Hockey League debut playing with Frölunda HC during the 2014–15 SHL season.
