= Linus Fröberg =

Swedish ice hockey player

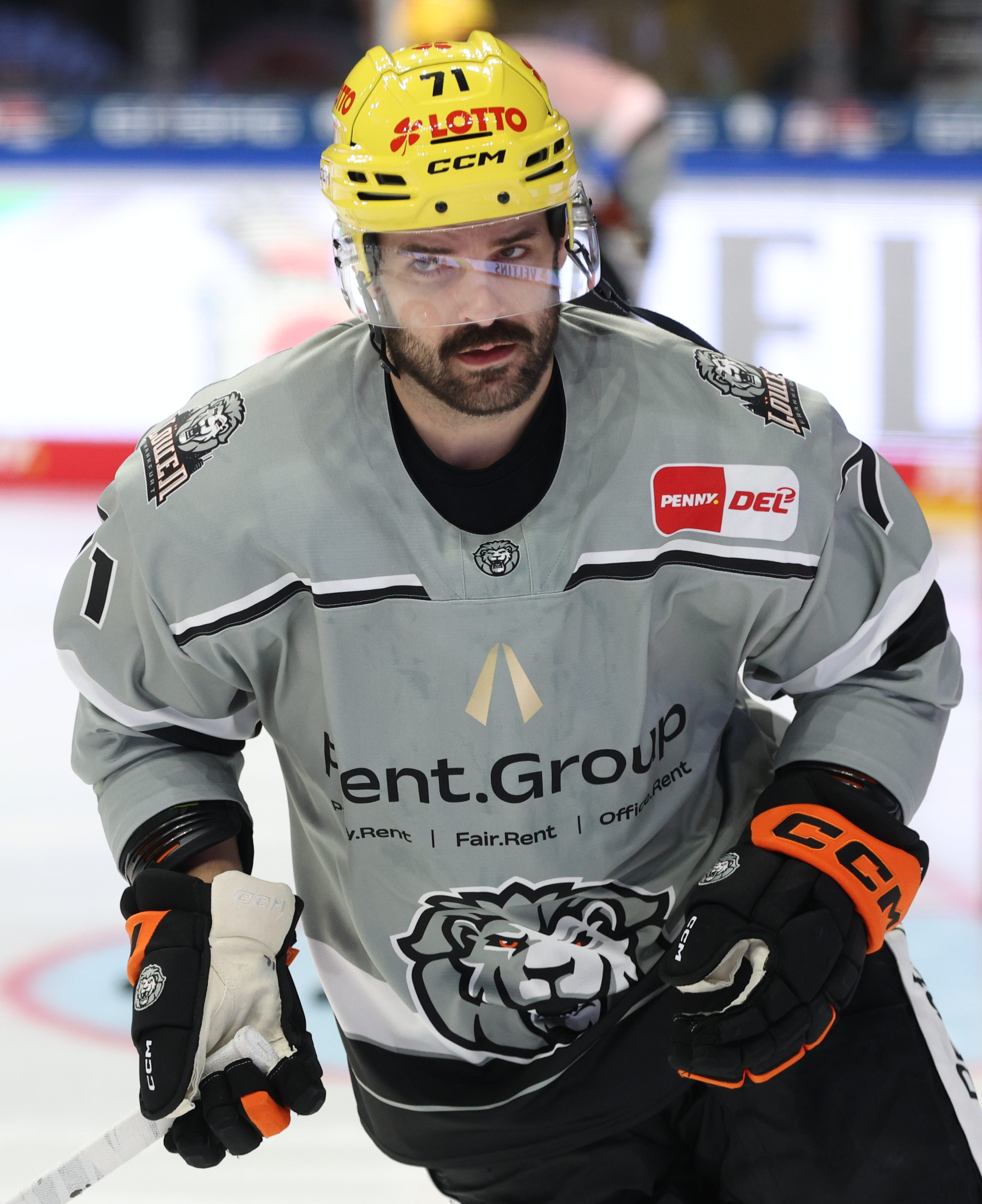
- Linus Fröberg in 2024
- Born: June 16, 1993 (age 31); Karlstad, Sweden
- Height: 6 ft 0 in (183 cm)
- Weight: 192 lb (87 kg; 13 st 10 lb)
- Position: Forward
- Shoots: Right
- DEL team Former teams: Löwen Frankfurt; Brynäs IF; Färjestad BK; Växjö Lakers; HV71; Luleå HF; HC TPS
- Playing career: 2011–present

Linus Fröberg (born June 16, 1993) is a Swedish professional ice hockey player, currently playing for Löwen Frankfurt in the Deutsche Eishockey Liga (DEL).

== Playing career ==
Fröberg made his professional debut in the Elitserien as a junior with Brynäs IF during the 2010–11 season. While with second SHL club, Färjestad BK, Fröberg was loaned to Mora IK of the HockeyAllsvenskan during the 2011–12 season.

Fröberg played four seasons with the Växjö Lakers, leaving following the 2018–19 campaign as a free agent. On 4 June 2019, Fröberg agreed to a two-year contract with HV71.

Following HV71 relegation to the HockeyAllsvenskan, Fröberg left the club to remain in the SHL with Luleå HF on a two-year contract on 5 July 2021.
