= Pontus Widerström =

Swedish ice hockey player

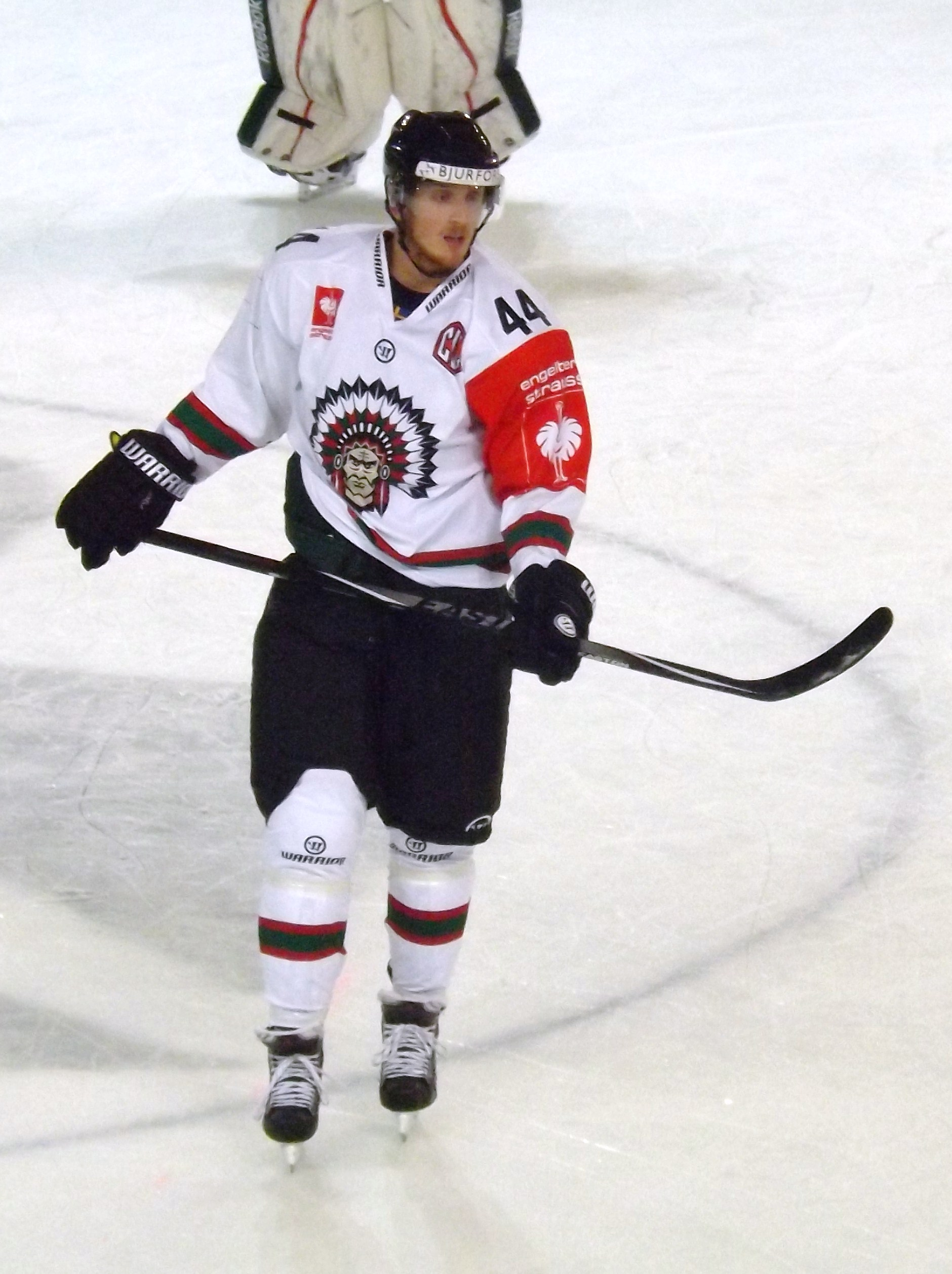
- Born: May 19, 1994 (age 31) Gothenburg, Sweden
- Height: 6 ft 3 in (191 cm)
- Weight: 198 lb (90 kg; 14 st 2 lb)
- Position: Centre
- Shoots: Left
- SHL team Former teams: Färjestad BK; Frölunda HC; EV Zug; Skellefteå AIK
- Playing career: 2012–present

Pontus Widerström (born May 19, 1994) is a Swedish professional ice hockey player who is currently playing for Färjestad BK of the Swedish Hockey League. He previously played with EV Zug of the National League (NL).

Widerström made his debut with Frölunda HC during the 2012 European Trophy.

== Awards and honors ==
Award	Year
SHL
Le Mat Trophy (Frölunda HC)	2016
Le Mat Trophy (Färjestad BK)	2022
CHL
Champions (Frölunda HC)	2016, 2017
