= Jakob Olsson (ice hockey) =

Swedish ice hockey player (born 1997)

- Born: March 7, 1997 (age 29) Lerum, Sweden
- Height: 5 ft 10 in (178 cm)
- Weight: 168 lb (76 kg; 12 st 0 lb)
- Position: Left Wing
- Shoots: Left
- SHL team: Frölunda HC
- NHL draft: Undrafted
- Playing career: 2015–present

Jakob Olsson (born March 7, 1997) is a Swedish ice hockey player. He is currently playing with Frölunda HC of the Swedish Hockey League (SHL).

Olsson made his Swedish Hockey League debut playing with Frölunda HC during the 2014–15 SHL season.
