= 2019–20 Champions Hockey League =

European ice hockey tournament

Tournament details
- Dates: 29 August 2019 – 4 February 2020
- Teams: 32

Final positions
- Champions: (Sweden) Frölunda HC (4th title)
- Runners-up: (Czech Republic) Mountfield HK

Tournament statistics
- Games played: 125
- Goals scored: 683 (5.46 per game)
- Attendance: 436,786 (3,494 per game)
- Scoring leader: (United States) Ryan Lasch (22 points)

Awards
- MVP: (United States) Ryan Lasch

The 2019–20 Champions Hockey League was the sixth season of the Champions Hockey League, a European ice hockey tournament. 32 teams are competing in the tournament, and qualification was on sporting merits only. The six founding leagues are represented by between three and five teams (based on a three-year league ranking), while seven "challenge leagues" are represented by one team each. One place was awarded to the champion of the 2018–19 Champions Hockey League as well as a wild card spot selected by the board. Unlike in the first three editions of the tournament, founding teams did not automatically qualify.

Swedish team Frölunda HC successfully defended their Champions Hockey League title, defeating Czech team Mountfield HK 3–1 in the final to win the European Trophy for a fourth time. For the first time in the history of the league, the final was held in the Czech Republic as Mountfield HK earned the right to host the game at ČPP Arena.

== Team allocation ==
A total of 32 teams from 13 different European first-tier leagues are participating in the 2019–20 Champions Hockey League. There were 24 teams from the six founding leagues, as well as the national champions from Slovakia, Norway, Denmark, France, Belarus, the United Kingdom and Poland qualified. Out of the founding leagues Sweden and Switzerland were allocated 5 teams, Finland and Czech Republic 4 with Austria and Germany given 3. Because no league was allowed more than five teams, the winner of the 2018–19 Champions Hockey League won a berth but at the expense of a place for their league.

Due to the fact that Arlan Kokshetau of the Kazakhstan Hockey Championship were ineligible to qualify for the Champions Hockey League despite winning the 2018–19 Continental Cup, it was announced that the board would select a Wild Card team in its place. On 13 February, the Champions Hockey League announced that the Belfast Giants as Continental Cup runners-up had been approved to take part as the Wild Card entry.

The qualification for these places was set out in the rules as follows:

1. CHL champions
2. National league champions (play-off winners)
3. Regular season winners
4. Regular season runners-up
5. Regular season third-placed team
6. Regular season fourth-placed team
7. Regular season fifth-placed team

For the Austrian Hockey League teams are however picked in this order:

1. League champions
2. Regular season winners
3. Pick Round winners
4. Pick Round runners-up
5. Losing playoff finalists

Note: the United Kingdom is the lone exception as the EIHL, in line with their traditions, determine their national champion following the regular season (not in the playoffs).

=== Teams ===
| Team | City/Area | League | Qualification | Participation | Previous best |
|---|---|---|---|---|---|
| (Sweden) Frölunda HC | Gothenburg | Swedish Hockey League | 2019 CHL winner | 6th | Champion |
| (Sweden) Färjestad BK | Karlstad | Swedish Hockey League | Regular season winner | 4th | Round of 32 |
| (Sweden) Luleå HF | Luleå | Swedish Hockey League | Regular season runner-up | 4th | Champion |
| (Sweden) Djurgårdens IF | Stockholm | Swedish Hockey League | Regular season fourth | 5th | Round of 16 |
| (Sweden) Skellefteå AIK | Skellefteå | Swedish Hockey League | Regular season fifth | 5th | Semi-finals |
| (Switzerland) SC Bern | Bern | National League | Play-off champion | 6th | Quarter-finals |
| (Switzerland) EV Zug | Zug | National League | Regular season runner-up | 6th | Round of 16 |
| (Switzerland) Lausanne HC | Lausanne | National League | Regular season third | 1st | First appearance |
| (Switzerland) EHC Biel | Biel/Bienne | National League | Regular season fourth | 1st | First appearance |
| (Switzerland) HC Ambrì-Piotta | Ambrì | National League | Regular season fifth | 1st | First appearance |
| (Finland) HPK | Hämeenlinna | Liiga | Play-off champion | 1st | First appearance |
| (Finland) Kärpät | Oulu | Liiga | Regular season winner | 5th | Final |
| (Finland) Tappara | Tampere | Liiga | Regular season runner-up | 6th | Round of 16 |
| (Finland) Pelicans | Lahti | Liiga | Regular season third | 1st | First appearance |
| (Czech Republic) Oceláři Třinec | Třinec | Czech Extraliga | Play-off champion | 5th | Semi-finals |
| (Czech Republic) Bílí Tygři Liberec | Liberec | Czech Extraliga | Regular season winner | 5th | Semi-finals |
| (Czech Republic) HC Plzeň | Plzeň | Czech Extraliga | Regular season third | 3rd | Semi-finals |
| (Czech Republic) Mountfield HK | Hradec Králové | Czech Extraliga | Regular season fourth | 3rd | Group stage |
| (Germany) Adler Mannheim | Mannheim | Deutsche Eishockey Liga | Play-off champion | 5th | Round of 16 |
| (Germany) Red Bull München | Munich | Deutsche Eishockey Liga | Regular season runner-up | 5th | Final |
| (Germany) Augsburger Panther | Augsburg | Deutsche Eishockey Liga | Regular season third | 1st | First appearance |
| (Austria) EC KAC | Klagenfurt | Austrian Hockey League | Play-off champion | 3rd | Group stage |
| (Austria) Graz 99ers | Graz | Austrian Hockey League | Regular season first round winner | 1st | First appearance |
| (Austria) Vienna Capitals | Vienna | Austrian Hockey League | Regular season pick round winner | 6th | Round of 16 |
| (United Kingdom) Belfast Giants | Belfast | Elite Ice Hockey League | Continental Cup Wild Card | 1st | First appearance |
| (Belarus) Yunost Minsk | Minsk | Belarusian Extraleague | Play-off champion | 3rd | Round of 32 |
| (Norway) Frisk Asker | Asker | GET-ligaen | Play-off champion | 1st | First appearance |
| (Slovakia) HC '05 Banská Bystrica | Banská Bystrica | Tipsport Liga | Play-off champion | 3rd | Group stage |
| (France) Brûleurs de Loups | Grenoble | Ligue Magnus | Play-off champion | 2nd | Group stage |
| (Denmark) Rungsted Ishockey | Rungsted | Metal Ligaen | Play-off champion | 1st | First appearance |
| (United Kingdom) Cardiff Devils | Cardiff | Elite Ice Hockey League | Regular season runner-up | 3rd | Group stage |
| (Poland) GKS Tychy | Tychy | Polska Hokej Liga | Play-off champion | 2nd | Group stage |

== Group stage ==
Teams in the 2019–20 Champions Hockey League
Black: Group A; Purple: Group B; Blue: Group C; Red: Group D; Orange: Group E; Green: Group F; White: Group G; Yellow: Group H.

For the group stage, the teams were drawn into 8 groups of 4 teams. Each team played home and away against every other team for a total of 6 games. The best 2 teams qualify to the round of 16.

=== Pots ===
The reigning CHL champions is the top seeded team and therefore given a place in pot 1. In the top pot there were also the reigning champions of the six founding leagues and the regular season winner of SHL. The 16 remaining teams from the founding leagues were placed to pots 2 and 3. The fourth pot include the playoff champions from the seven challenge leagues and the Belfast Giants, the wild card team following the 2018–19 IIHF Continental Cup.

| Pot 1 | Pot 2 | Pot 3 | Pot 4 |
|---|---|---|---|
| (Sweden) Frölunda HC (Sweden) Färjestad BK (Switzerland) SC Bern (Finland) HPK (Czech Republic) Oceláři Třinec (Germany) Adler Mannheim (Austria) EC KAC (Sweden) Luleå HF | (Switzerland) EV Zug (Finland) Kärpät (Czech Republic) Bílí Tygři Liberec (Germany) Red Bull München (Austria) Graz 99ers (Sweden) Djurgårdens IF (Switzerland) Lausanne HC (Finland) Tappara | (Czech Republic) HC Plzeň (Germany) Augsburger Panther (Austria) Vienna Capitals (Sweden) Skellefteå AIK (Switzerland) EHC Biel (Finland) Pelicans (Czech Republic) Mountfield HK (Switzerland) HC Ambrì-Piotta | (Belarus) Yunost Minsk (Norway) Frisk Asker (Slovakia) HC '05 Banská Bystrica (France) Brûleurs de Loups (Denmark) Rungsted Ishockey (United Kingdom) Cardiff Devils (Poland) GKS Tychy (United Kingdom) Belfast Giants |

=== Group A ===
| Pos | Team | Pld | W | OTW | OTL | L | GF | GA | GD | Pts | Qualification | BIE | TAP | KAC | FAS |
|---|---|---|---|---|---|---|---|---|---|---|---|---|---|---|---|
| 1 | (Switzerland) EHC Biel | 6 | 5 | 0 | 0 | 1 | 16 | 9 | +7 | 15 | Advance to Playoffs | — | 1–0 | 4–2 | 2–1 |
| 2 | (Finland) Tappara | 6 | 4 | 0 | 0 | 2 | 21 | 11 | +10 | 12 | Advance to Playoffs | 1–0 | — | 8–3 | 7–3 |
| 3 | (Austria) EC KAC | 6 | 3 | 0 | 0 | 3 | 18 | 20 | −2 | 9 | | 3–6 | 3–2 | — | 3–0 |
| 4 | (Norway) Frisk Asker | 6 | 0 | 0 | 0 | 6 | 7 | 22 | −15 | 0 | | 2–3 | 1–3 | 0–4 | — |

Source: Champions Hockey League

=== Group B ===
| Pos | Team | Pld | W | OTW | OTL | L | GF | GA | GD | Pts | Qualification | EVZ | PLZ | HPK | RUN |
|---|---|---|---|---|---|---|---|---|---|---|---|---|---|---|---|
| 1 | (Switzerland) EV Zug | 6 | 4 | 0 | 2 | 0 | 22 | 11 | +11 | 14 | Advance to Playoffs | — | 5–2 | 3–4 (SO) | 5–2 |
| 2 | (Czech Republic) HC Plzeň | 6 | 2 | 3 | 0 | 1 | 24 | 16 | +8 | 12 | Advance to Playoffs | 2–1 (SO) | — | 5–4 (OT) | 9–3 |
| 3 | (Finland) HPK | 6 | 1 | 1 | 2 | 2 | 13 | 16 | −3 | 7 | | 1–3 | 1–2 (OT) | — | 2–0 |
| 4 | (Denmark) Rungsted Ishockey | 6 | 1 | 0 | 0 | 5 | 10 | 26 | −16 | 3 | | 0–5 | 2–4 | 3–1 | — |

Source: Champions Hockey League

=== Group C ===
| Pos | Team | Pld | W | OTW | OTL | L | GF | GA | GD | Pts | Qualification | LHF | AUG | LIB | BEL |
|---|---|---|---|---|---|---|---|---|---|---|---|---|---|---|---|
| 1 | (Sweden) Luleå HF | 6 | 3 | 2 | 1 | 0 | 26 | 15 | +11 | 14 | Advance to Playoffs | — | 2–3 (SO) | 4–1 | 4–0 |
| 2 | (Germany) Augsburger Panther | 6 | 2 | 2 | 2 | 0 | 18 | 15 | +3 | 12 | Advance to Playoffs | 4–5 (OT) | — | 2–3 (SO) | 3–1 |
| 3 | (Czech Republic) Bílí Tygři Liberec | 6 | 1 | 1 | 1 | 3 | 20 | 20 | 0 | 6 | | 4–5 (OT) | 2–3 | — | 6–1 |
| 4 | (United Kingdom) Belfast Giants | 6 | 1 | 0 | 1 | 4 | 12 | 26 | −14 | 4 | | 3–6 | 2–3 (OT) | 5–4 | — |

Source: Champions Hockey League

=== Group D ===
| Pos | Team | Pld | W | OTW | OTL | L | GF | GA | GD | Pts | Qualification | LAU | YUN | TRI | PEL |
|---|---|---|---|---|---|---|---|---|---|---|---|---|---|---|---|
| 1 | (Switzerland) Lausanne HC | 6 | 2 | 2 | 2 | 0 | 20 | 17 | +3 | 12 | Advance to Playoffs | — | 3–2 | 5–3 | 4–3 (SO) |
| 2 | (Belarus) Yunost Minsk | 6 | 2 | 1 | 1 | 2 | 15 | 17 | −2 | 9 | Advance to Playoffs | 3–2 (OT) | — | 2–0 | 2–3 (SO) |
| 3 | (Czech Republic) Oceláři Třinec | 6 | 2 | 1 | 0 | 3 | 17 | 14 | +3 | 8 | | 2–1 (OT) | 7–2 | — | 5–3 |
| 4 | (Finland) Pelicans | 6 | 1 | 1 | 2 | 2 | 16 | 20 | −4 | 7 | | 4–5 (SO) | 2–4 | 1–0 | — |

Source: Champions Hockey League

=== Group E ===
| Pos | Team | Pld | W | OTW | OTL | L | GF | GA | GD | Pts | Qualification | SKE | SCB | KAR | BdL |
|---|---|---|---|---|---|---|---|---|---|---|---|---|---|---|---|
| 1 | (Sweden) Skellefteå AIK | 6 | 2 | 2 | 1 | 1 | 19 | 14 | +5 | 11 (Note: Head-to-head points: Skellefteå AIK 8, SC Bern 5, Kärpät 5.) | Advance to Playoffs | — | 3–2 (SO) | 2–0 | 1–2 |
| 2 | (Switzerland) SC Bern | 6 | 2 | 1 | 3 | 0 | 17 | 14 | +3 | 11 | Advance to Playoffs | 4–5 (SO) | — | 1–2 (SO) | 4–1 |
| 3 | (Finland) Kärpät | 6 | 2 | 2 | 1 | 1 | 18 | 13 | +5 | 11 | | 5–4 (SO) | 2–3 (OT) | — | 3–1 |
| 4 | (France) Brûleurs de Loups | 6 | 1 | 0 | 0 | 5 | 8 | 21 | −13 | 3 | | 1–4 | 1–3 | 2–6 | — |

Source: Champions Hockey League
Rules for classification: Group stage tiebreakers

=== Group F ===
| Pos | Team | Pld | W | OTW | OTL | L | GF | GA | GD | Pts | Qualification | MAN | DIF | VIC | GKS |
|---|---|---|---|---|---|---|---|---|---|---|---|---|---|---|---|
| 1 | (Germany) Adler Mannheim | 6 | 4 | 1 | 0 | 1 | 23 | 10 | +13 | 14 | Advance to Playoffs | — | 2–1 | 4–0 | 5–0 |
| 2 | (Sweden) Djurgårdens IF | 6 | 4 | 0 | 0 | 2 | 20 | 14 | +6 | 12 | Advance to Playoffs | 6–3 | — | 3–6 | 2–0 |
| 3 | (Austria) Vienna Capitals | 6 | 2 | 0 | 0 | 4 | 15 | 21 | −6 | 6 | | 1–6 | 1–2 | — | 5–2 |
| 4 | (Poland) GKS Tychy | 6 | 1 | 0 | 1 | 4 | 10 | 23 | −13 | 4 | | 2–3 (OT) | 2–6 | 4–2 | — |

Source: Champions Hockey League

=== Group G ===
| Pos | Team | Pld | W | OTW | OTL | L | GF | GA | GD | Pts | Qualification | RBM | FBK | AMB | BAB |
|---|---|---|---|---|---|---|---|---|---|---|---|---|---|---|---|
| 1 | (Germany) Red Bull München | 6 | 3 | 1 | 1 | 1 | 14 | 9 | +5 | 12 | Advance to Playoffs | — | 2–1 | 3–0 | 3–0 |
| 2 | (Sweden) Färjestad BK | 6 | 3 | 1 | 0 | 2 | 17 | 10 | +7 | 11 | Advance to Playoffs | 3–1 | — | 2–1 | 6–1 |
| 3 | (Switzerland) HC Ambrì-Piotta | 6 | 3 | 0 | 1 | 2 | 13 | 12 | +1 | 10 | | 2–3 (SO) | 2–1 | — | 4–3 |
| 4 | (Slovakia) HC '05 Banská Bystrica | 6 | 0 | 1 | 1 | 4 | 10 | 23 | −13 | 3 | | 3–2 (SO) | 3–4 (OT) | 0–4 | — |

Source: Champions Hockey League

=== Group H ===
| Pos | Team | Pld | W | OTW | OTL | L | GF | GA | GD | Pts | Qualification | FHC | MHK | CAR | GRA |
|---|---|---|---|---|---|---|---|---|---|---|---|---|---|---|---|
| 1 | (Sweden) Frölunda HC | 6 | 4 | 0 | 1 | 1 | 34 | 17 | +17 | 13 | Advance to Playoffs | — | 2–3 | 9–2 | 5–6 (SO) |
| 2 | (Czech Republic) Mountfield HK | 6 | 4 | 0 | 0 | 2 | 22 | 13 | +9 | 12 | Advance to Playoffs | 3–4 | — | 5–2 | 7–1 |
| 3 | (United Kingdom) Cardiff Devils | 6 | 2 | 1 | 0 | 3 | 18 | 30 | −12 | 8 | | 2–9 | 3–2 | — | 4–3 (SO) |
| 4 | (Austria) Graz 99ers | 6 | 0 | 1 | 1 | 4 | 14 | 28 | −14 | 3 | | 1–5 | 1–2 | 2–5 | — |

Source: Champions Hockey League

=== Group stage tie-breaking criteria ===
If two teams were tied in points after the group stage is finished, the teams precedence is decided by head-to-head games. If the teams are still tied after that, then the team that was ranked higher prior to the tournament took precedence. When comparing head-to-head results, the following criteria were applied:

1. more points in games against the other tied team
2. better goal difference in games against the other tied team
3. more goals scored against the other tied team
4. more goals scored in a single game against the other tied team
5. overtime wins against the other tied team
6. more goals scored in the two game winning shot competitions
7. higher position in the 2016–17 CHL club ranking

== Playoffs ==
=== Qualified teams ===
| Group | Winners (seed) | Runners-up |
|---|---|---|
| A | (Switzerland) EHC Biel | (Finland) Tappara |
| B | (Switzerland) EV Zug | (Czech Republic) HC Plzeň |
| C | (Sweden) Luleå HF | (Germany) Augsburger Panther |
| D | (Switzerland) Lausanne HC | (Belarus) Yunost Minsk |
| E | (Sweden) Skellefteå AIK | (Switzerland) SC Bern |
| F | (Germany) Adler Mannheim | (Sweden) Djurgårdens IF |
| G | (Germany) Red Bull München | (Sweden) Färjestad BK |
| H | (Sweden) Frölunda HC | (Czech Republic) Mountfield HK |

=== Format ===
In each round except the final, the teams played two games and the aggregate score decided which team advanced. As a rule, the first leg was hosted by the team who had the inferior record in the tournament with the second leg being played on the home ice of the other team. If aggregate score is tied, a sudden death overtime followed. If the overtime is scoreless, the team who wins the shoot out competition advances.

The final was played on the home ice of the team who had the better record in the tournament.

=== Bracket ===
The eight group winners and the eight second-placed teams advanced to the Round of 16. The teams were divided into two seeding groups and group winners were randomly drawn against runners-up. Teams who had faced each other in the group stage could not be drawn against each other in the round of 16. The draw took place in Helsinki, Finland on 18 October 2019.

Round of 16
1 | (Sweden) Djurgårdens IF | 3 | 4 | 7
16 | (Sweden) Skellefteå AIK | 3 | 1 | 4
8 | (Belarus) Yunost Minsk | 2 | 0 | 2
9 | (Germany) Red Bull München | 3 | 6 | 9
5 | (Finland) Tappara | 3 | 1 | 4
12 | (Switzerland) EV Zug | 3 | 3 | 6
4 | (Czech Republic) Mountfield HK | 1 | 1 | 2
13 | (Germany) Adler Mannheim | 0 | 1 | 1
6 | (Germany) Augsburger Panther | 2 | 1 | 3
11 | (Switzerland) EHC Biel (OT) | 2 | 2 | 4
3 | (Sweden) Färjestad BK | 6 | 2 | 8
14 | (Sweden) Frölunda HC | 3 | 8 | 11
7 | (Switzerland) SC Bern | 0 | 2 | 2
10 | (Sweden) Luleå HF | 3 | 4 | 7
2 | (Czech Republic) HC Plzeň | 1 | 4 | 5
15 | (Switzerland) Lausanne HC (OT) | 2 | 4 | 6

Quarter-finals
(Sweden) Djurgårdens IF | 5 | 3 | 8
(Germany) Red Bull München | 1 | 0 | 1
(Switzerland) EV Zug | 1 | 0 | 1
(Czech Republic) Mountfield HK | 1 | 4 | 5
(Switzerland) EHC Biel | 3 | 3 | 6
(Sweden) Frölunda HC (OT) | 2 | 5 | 7
(Sweden) Luleå HF | 2 | 5 | 7
(Switzerland) Lausanne HC | 1 | 2 | 3

Semi-finals
(Sweden) Djurgårdens IF | 1 | 0 | 1
(Czech Republic) Mountfield HK | 3 | 3 | 6
(Sweden) Frölunda HC | 2 | 3 | 5
(Sweden) Luleå HF | 3 | 1 | 4

Final
(Czech Republic) Mountfield HK | 1
(Sweden) Frölunda HC | 3

Note:

1. The teams listed on top of each tie were runners up in the group stage and play the first leg at home. The bottom team were group winners and play the second leg at home. Skellefteå AIK, however, would play their first leg at home in their tie against Djurgårdens IF.
2. The order of the legs (which team starts at home) in the future rounds may be changed as the team with the best record should have the second game at home.

=== Round of 16 ===
==== First Leg ====
| 12 November 2019; 17:00 CET | Yunost Minsk (Belarus) | 2–3 (2–0, 0–1, 0–2) | (Germany) Red Bull München | Chizhovka-Arena, Minsk; Attendance: 3,243 |

Game reference

Igor Brikun
Goalies
Danny aus den Birken
Referees:
Kristian Vikman
Mark Lemelin
Linesmen:
Artsiom Labzou
Mikita Paliakou

| Gainetdinov (Brikun) – 8:26 | 1–0 |
| Drozdov (Stefanovich) – 16:52 | 2–0 |
| | 2–1 | 33:23 – Schütz |
| | 2–2 | 41:30 – (PP) Parkes (Schütz) |
| | 2–3 | 43:29 – Ehliz (Hager, Bodnarchuk) |

10 min
Penalties
12 min
22
Shots
33

| 12 November 2019 | HC Plzeň (Czech Republic) | 1–2 (0–0, 1–1, 0–1) | (Switzerland) Lausanne HC | Logspeed CZ Aréna, Plzeň; Attendance: 5,360 |

Game reference

Dominik Frodl
Goalies
Tobias Stephan
Referees:
Daniel Rencz
Kristijan Nikolić
Linesmen:
Jiří Ondráček
Josef Špůr

| Pour (Kantner) – 34:26 | 1–0 |
| | 1–1 | 37:56 – Vermin (Lindbohm, Frick) |
| | 1–2 | 56:41 – (PP) Genazzi (Almond) |

2 min
Penalties
2 min
24
Shots
26

| 12 November 2019; 18:00 CET | Skellefteå AIK (Sweden) | 3–3 (2–1, 1–1, 0–1) | (Sweden) Djurgårdens IF | Skellefteå Kraft Arena, Skellefteå; Attendance: 1,904 |

Game reference

Mantas Armalis
Goalies
Niklas Svedberg
Referees:
Christian Persson
Tobias Björk
Linesmen:
Johannes Käck
Emil Yletyinen

| Pudas (Alvarez, Burström) – 1:25 | 1–0 |
| Olofsson – 5:24 | 2–0 |
| | 2–1 | 5:57 – Eriksson |
| | 2–2 | 21:08 – Guter (Alsing) |
| Pettersson (Frödén, Wingerli) – 26:27 | 3–2 |
| | 3–3 | 48:52 – (ENG) Svedberg |

6 min
Penalties
6 min
40
Shots
27

| 12 November 2019; 18:00 CET | Färjestad BK (Sweden) | 6–3 (3–0, 2–1, 1–2) | (Sweden) Frölunda HC | Lofbergs Arena, Karlstad; Attendance: 4,423 |

Game reference

Markus Svensson
Goalies
Niklas Rubin (pulled at 23:27) Johan Mattsson
Referees:
Stanislav Raming
Viktor Birin
Linesmen:
Fredrik Altberg
Örjan Åhlen

| Nilsson (Erixon) – 0:40 | 1–0 |
| Ejdsell (Johansson, Blum) – 17:14 | 2–0 |
| Viksten – 18:52 | 3–0 |
| Åslund (Johansson, Erixon) – 21:06 | 4–0 |
| Ejdsell (Johansson) – 23:27 | 5–0 |
| | 5–1 | 32:02 – Mustonen (Friberg, Lundqvist) |
| | 5–2 | 41:14 – Lasch (Hjalmarsson, Peterson) |
| Åslund (Mozík, Johansson) – 45:58 | 6–2 |
| | 6–3 | 47:52 – Printz (Rakhshani, Grönlund) |

8 min
Penalties
2 min
30
Shots
27

| 12 November 2019; 18:00 CET | Tappara (Finland) | 3–3 (0–2, 3–0, 0–1) | (Switzerland) EV Zug | Hakametsä, Tampere; Attendance: 5,275 |

Game reference

Christian Heljanko
Goalies
Leonardo Genoni
Referees:
Lasse Kopitz
André Schrader
Linesmen:
Joona Elonen
Markus Hägerström

| | 0–1 | 1:42 – Simion (Zryd, Zgraggen) |
| | 0–2 | 6:04 – (PP) Alatalo (Klingberg, Lindberg) |
| Kemiläinen (Kuusela, Bertrand (PP) – 27:37 | 1–2 |
| Karjalainen (Kuusela, Kemiläinen) (PP) – 33:25 | 2–2 |
| Vauhkonen (Virta, Suhonen) (PP) – 39:16 | 3–2 |
| | 3–3 | 42:31 – Hofmann |

8 min
Penalties
10 min
20
Shots
32

| 12 November 2019; 19:30 CET | Augsburger Panther (Germany) | 2–2 (1–0, 1–0, 0–2) | (Switzerland) EHC Biel | Curt Frenzel Stadion, Augsburg; Attendance: 5,580 |

Game reference

Olivier Roy
Goalies
Elien Paupe
Referees:
Eduards Odins
Aaro Brännare
Linesmen:
Andreas Hofer
Gabriel Gaube

| Hafenrichter (LeBlanc, Valentine) – 0:28 | 1–0 |
| Fraser (Gill) – 20:55 | 2–0 |
| | 2–1 | 47:04 – Ullström (Ulmer) |
| | 2–2 | 53:43 – Rajala (Ullström) |

8 min
Penalties
6 min
40
Shots
26

| 12 November 2019; 19:45 CET | SC Bern (Switzerland) | 0–3 (0–0, 0–3, 0–0) | (Sweden) Luleå HF | PostFinance Arena, Bern; Attendance: 4,019 |

Game reference

Niklas Schlegel
Goalies
David Rautio
Referees:
Andrei Schrubok
Mikko Kaukokari
Linesmen:
Balazs Kovacs
Marc-Henri Progin

| 0–1 | 23:42 – Lundkvist (Jalvanti, Tyrväinen) |
| 0–2 | 26:54 – Kovacs (Engsund, Emanuelsson) |
| 0–3 | 27:48 – Brännström (Ilomäki, Sellgren) |

2 min
Penalties
6 min
21
Shots
25

| 13 November 2019; 18:00 CET | Mountfield HK (Czech Republic) | 1–0 (0–0, 0–0, 1–0) | (Germany) Adler Mannheim | ČPP Arena, Hradec Králové; Attendance: 2,647 |

Game reference
| Marek Mazanec | Goalies | Johan Gustafsson | Referees: Daniel Rencz; Kristijan Nikolić; Linesmen: Daniel Hynek; Miroslav Lhotský |
| Jergl (Klíma) – 55:52 / 1–0 | | | Referees: Daniel Rencz; Kristijan Nikolić; Linesmen: Daniel Hynek; Miroslav Lhotský |
| 6 min | Penalties | 4 min | Referees: Daniel Rencz; Kristijan Nikolić; Linesmen: Daniel Hynek; Miroslav Lhotský |
| 28 | Shots | 23 | Referees: Daniel Rencz; Kristijan Nikolić; Linesmen: Daniel Hynek; Miroslav Lhotský |

==== Second Leg ====
| 19 November 2019; 18:00 CET | Frölunda HC (Sweden) | 8–2 (2–1, 2–1, 4–0) | (Sweden) Färjestad BK | Frölundaborg, Gothenburg; Attendance: 3,472 |

Game reference

Johan Mattsson
Goalies
Markus Svensson (pulled at 31:26) Arvid Holm
Referees:
Mikko Kaukokari
Aaro Brännare
Linesmen:
Henrik Pihlblad
Ludvig Lundgren

| Ekbom (Carlsson, Fagemo) – 3:13 | 1–0 |
| Hjalmarsson (Rakhshani, Lasch) (PP) – 5:29 | 2–0 |
| | 2–1 | 7:29 – Arnesson (Rydahl, Nilsson) |
| Lasch (Hjalmarsson, Rakhshani) (PP) – 29:11 | 3–1 |
| Mustonen (Gormley, Lundqvist) – 31:26 | 4–1 |
| | 4–2 | 34:06 – Rydahl (Lindqvist, Nilsson) |
| Lasu (Sundström, Fagemo) (PP) – 47:20 | 5–2 |
| Lasu (Carlsson, Lennström) (PP) – 48:31 | 6–2 |
| Lasu (Grönlund, Rakhshani) – 56:12 | 7–2 |
| Lennström (Mattson) (ENG) – 57:03 | 8–2 |

6 min
Penalties
18 min
41
Shots
16

Frölunda HC won 11–8 on Aggregate.

| 19 November 2019; 18:00 CET | Luleå HF (Sweden) | 4–2 (2–2, 1–0, 1–0) | (Switzerland) SC Bern | Coop Norrbotten Arena, Attendance: 2,225 |

Game reference

Joel Lassinantti
Goalies
Pascal Caminada
Referees:
Marian Rohatsch
Marc Iwert
Linesmen:
Emil Yletyinen
Jan Sandström

| | 0–1 | 5:45 – (SHG) Ebbett (Untersander) |
| Kovacs (Gustavsson) – 14:02 | 1–1 |
| Ilomäki (Gustavsson, Jalvanti) – 18:15 | 2–1 |
| | 2–2 | 19:03 – Burren (Untersander, Ebbett) |
| Ilomäki (Kovacs, Sellgren) (PP) – 29:03 | 3–2 |
| Ilomäki (Tyrväinen, Kovacs) (PP) 55:43 | 4–2 |

4 min
Penalties
10 min
28
Shots
15

Luleå HF won 7–2 on Aggregate.

| 19 November 2019; 18:00 CET | Djurgårdens IF (Sweden) | 4–1 (1–0, 1–0, 2–1) | (Sweden) Skellefteå AIK | Hovet, Stockholm; Attendance: 2,732 |

Game reference

Niklas Svedberg
Goalies
Gustaf Lindvall
Referees:
Robin Šír
Oldřich Hejduk
Linesmen:
Andreas Malmqvist
Daniel Persson

| Axelsson (Berglund) (PP, 5 ON 3) – 14:43 | 1–0 |
| Possler (Östman) – 38:33 | 2–0 |
| | 2–1 | 45:04 – (PP) Lindström (Möller, Pudas) |
| Bergfors (Alsing, Hultström) (PP) – 48:35 | 3–1 |
| Berglund (Guter, Holtz) (PP, 5 ON 3) – 52:25 | 4–1 |

12 min
Penalties
18 min
31
Shots
27

Djurgårdens IF won 7–4 on aggregate.

| 19 November 2019; 19:00 CET | Adler Mannheim (Germany) | 1–1 (0–0, 0–1, 1–0) | (Czech Republic) Mountfield HK | SAP Arena, Mannheim; Attendance: 3,611 |

Game reference
| Dennis Endras | Goalies | Marek Mazanec | Referees: Linus Öhlund; Tobias Björk; Linesmen: Christopher Hurtik; Joep Leermakers |
| / 0–1 / 39:07 – Chalupa (Jergl, Pilař); Hungerecker (Soramies, Lampl) – 49:13 / 1–1 | | | Referees: Linus Öhlund; Tobias Björk; Linesmen: Christopher Hurtik; Joep Leermakers |
| 10 min | Penalties | 14 min | Referees: Linus Öhlund; Tobias Björk; Linesmen: Christopher Hurtik; Joep Leermakers |
| 21 | Shots | 21 | Referees: Linus Öhlund; Tobias Björk; Linesmen: Christopher Hurtik; Joep Leermakers |

Mountfield HK won 2–1 on Aggregate.

| 19 November 2019; 19:45 CET | EV Zug (Switzerland) | 3–1 (1–0, 2–0, 0–1) | (Finland) Tappara | Bossard Arena, Zug; Attendance: 3,559 |

Game reference

Luca Hollenstein
Goalies
Michael Garteig
Referees:
Vladimír Pešina
Antonín Jeřábek
Linesmen:
Roman Kaderli
Eric Cattaneo

| Simion (Schlumpf, Leuenberger) – 10:40 | 1–0 |
| Hofmann (Kovář, McIntyre) (PP) – 27:58 | 2–0 |
| Hofmann (Diaz) (PP) – 34:27 | 3–0 |
| | 3–1 | 49:49 – Bertrand (Malinen) |

6 min
Penalties
8 min
26
Shots
19

EV Zug won 6–4 on Aggregate.

| 19 November 2019; 19:45 CET | Lausanne HC (Switzerland) | 4–4 (OT) (3–2, 0–0, 0–2) (OT 1–0) | (Czech Republic) HC Plzeň | Vaudoise Aréna, Lausanne; Attendance: 3,239 |

Game reference

Tobias Stephan
Goalies
Dominik Frodl
Referees:
Daniel Piechaczek
Manuel Nikolić
Linesmen:
Dominik Altmann
Thomas Wolf

| Jeffrey (Kenins, Heldner) – 5:41 | 1–0 |
| | 1–1 | 9:21 – Kracík (Pour) |
| | 1–2 | 11:40 – Kaňák (Vlach, Pour) |
| Lindbohm (Vermin) – 11:50 | 2–2 |
| Moy Nodari – 15:31 | 3–2 |
| | 3–3 | 46:30 – Kantner (Pour) |
| | 3–4 | 53:25 – Rob (Houdek, Malát) |
| Emmerton (Genazzi) – 60:58 | 4–4 |

4 min
Penalties
8 min
34
Shots
26

Lausanne HC won 6–5 on Aggregate in Overtime.

| 19 November 2019; 19:45 CET | EHC Biel (Switzerland) | 2–1 (OT) (0–0, 1–1, 0–0,) (OT 1–0) | (Germany) Augsburger Panther | Tissot Arena, Biel/Bienne; Attendance: 4,632 |

Game reference

Elien Paupe
Goalies
Olivier Roy
Referees:
Mikael Nord
Mikael Sjökvist
Linesmen:
Dario Fuchs
Dominik Schlegel

| Kessler (Fuchs) – 21:15 | 1–0 |
| | 1–1 | 37:55 – LeBlanc (Haase) |
| Rajala – 63:04 | 2–1 |

8 min
Penalties
6 min
35
Shots
26

EHC Biel won 4–3 on Aggregate in Overtime.

| 20 November 2019; 20:00 CET | Red Bull München (Germany) | 6–0 (0–0, 1–0, 5–0) | (Belarus) Yunost Minsk | Olympia Eishalle, Munich; Attendance: 4,120 |

Game reference

Kevin Reich
Goalies
Igor Brikun (pulled at 54:41) Yan Shelepnyov
Referees:
Marc Wiegand
Daniel Stricker
Linesmen:
Andreas Hofer
Tobias Schwenk

| Bodnarchuk (SHG) – 35:56 | 1–0 |
| Sanguinetti (Voakes) (PP) – 46:16 | 2–0 |
| Bourque (Parkes, Peterka) (PP) – 49:21 | 3–0 |
| Peterka (Bourque, Abeltshauser) – 54:01 | 4–0 |
| Schütz – 54:41 | 5–0 |
| Zitterbart (Voakes, Bodnarchuk) (PP) – 55:32 | 6–0 |

37 min
Penalties
82 min
34
Shots
19

Red Bull München won 9–2 on Aggregate.

=== Quarter-finals ===
==== First Leg ====
| 3 December 2019; 18:00 CET | Mountfield HK (Czech Republic) | 1–1 (0–1, 0–0, 1–0) | (Switzerland) EV Zug | ČPP Arena, Hradec Králové; Attendance: 2,503 |

Game reference
| Marek Mazanec | Goalies | Luca Hollenstein | Referees: Mikael Sjökvist; Linus Öhlund; Linesmen: Tomáš Brejcha; Jiří Svoboda |
| / 0–1 / 4:48 – Simion (Diaz); Vincour (Smoleňák, Pavlík) (PP) – 44:07 / 1–1 | | | Referees: Mikael Sjökvist; Linus Öhlund; Linesmen: Tomáš Brejcha; Jiří Svoboda |
| 6 min | Penalties | 6 min | Referees: Mikael Sjökvist; Linus Öhlund; Linesmen: Tomáš Brejcha; Jiří Svoboda |
| 31 | Shots | 27 | Referees: Mikael Sjökvist; Linus Öhlund; Linesmen: Tomáš Brejcha; Jiří Svoboda |

| 3 December 2019; 18:00 CET | Frölunda HC (Sweden) | 2–3 (0–0, 0–2, 2–1) | (Switzerland) EHC Biel | Frölundaborg, Gothenburg; Attendance: 3,182 |

Game reference

Johan Mattsson
Goalies
Jonas Hiller
Referees:
Robin Šír
Oldřich Hejduk
Linesmen:
Ludvig Lundgren
Anders Nyqvist

| | 0–1 | 24:03 – (PP) Fuchs (Salmela, Ullström) |
| | 0–2 | 33:49 – Brunner (Kreis) |
| | 0–3 | 40:52 – Pouliot (Rajala, Moser) |
| Lasu (Carlsson, Grönlund) – 50:52 | 1–3 |
| Mustonen (Moverare) | 2–3 |

4 min
Penalties
10 min
53
Shots
18

| 3 December 2019; 18:00 CET | Djurgårdens IF (Sweden) | 5–1 (2–1, 2–0, 1–0) | (Germany) Red Bull München | Hovet, Stockholm; Attendance: 1,796 |

Game reference

Karri Rämö
Goalies
Kevin Reich (Pulled at 40:00) Daniel Fießinger
Referees:
Mark Lemelin
Marc Wiegand
Linesmen:
Örjan Åhlen
Andreas Malmqvist

| Berglund (Johansson, Bergfors) – 6:45 | 1–0 |
| | 1–1 | 8:42 – Jaffray (Mauer) |
| Possler (Nilsson, Alsing) – 9:02 | 2–1 |
| Östman (Eriksson, Possler) – 30:05 | 3–1 |
| Nilsson (Hedman, Wandell) – 34:21 | 4–1 |
| Hedman (Strandberg, Högström) (PP) – 55:26 | 5–1 |

6 min
Penalties
8 min
29
Shots
21

| 3 December 2019; 20:15 CET | Lausanne HC (Switzerland) | 1–2 (0–0, 1–1, 0–1) | (Sweden) Luleå HF | Vaudoise Aréna, Lausanne; Attendance: 3,232 |

Game reference

Luca Boltshauser
Goalies
Joel Lassinantti
Referees:
Daniel Piechaczek
Aleksi Rantala
Linesmen:
Balazs Kovacs
Marc-Henri Progin

| | 0–1 | 31:53 – (PP) Kovacs (Sellgren, Ilomäki) |
| Jooris (Genazzi, Emmerton) (PP) – 39:35 | 1–1 |
| | 1–2 | 41:07 – Kovacs (Sellgren, Sondell) |

10 min
Penalties
4 min
26
Shots
21

==== Second Leg ====
| 10 December 2019; 18:00 CET | Luleå HF (Sweden) | 5–2 (2–1, 0–0, 3–1) | (Switzerland) Lausanne HC | Coop Norrbotten Arena, Luleå; Attendance: 2,895 |

Game reference

David Rautio
Goalies
Tobias Stephan
Referees:
Aaro Brännare
Mikko Kaukokari
Linesmen:
Emil Yletyinen
Jan Sandström

| | 0–1 | 3:15 – (SHG) Vermin (Jooris) |
| Brännström (Olausson, Gustavsson) (PP) – 3:58 | 1–1 |
| Gunler – 17:44 | 2–1 |
| Gunler (Lundkvist, Connolly) (PP) – 42:27 | 3–1 |
| Sondell (Berglund) (ENG) – 53:01 | 4–1 |
| | 4–2 | 57:38 – (PPEAG) Almond (Bertschy) |
| Farley (Berglund, Fabricius) – 59:43 | 5–2 |

8 min
Penalties
10 min
28
Shots
27

Luleå HF won 7–3 on Aggregate.

| 10 December 2019; 19:45 CET | EV Zug (Switzerland) | 0–4 (0–0, 0–3, 0–1) | (Czech Republic) Mountfield HK | Bossard Arena, Zug; Attendance: 4,450 |

Game reference

Leonardo Genoni
Goalies
Marek Mazanec
Referees:
Tobias Björk
Mikael Nord
Linesmen:
Roman Kaderli
Dominik Schlegel

| 0–1 | 22:16 – Koukal |
| 0–2 | 27:33 – Smoleňák |
| 0–3 | 29:57 – (PP) Pavlík (Zámorský, Koukal) |
| 0–4 | 58:33 – (ENG) Chalupa (Smoleňák) |

27 min
Penalties
33 min
29
Shots
24

Mountfield HK won 5–1 on Aggregate.

| 10 December 2019; 19:45 CET | EHC Biel (Switzerland) | 3–5 (OT) (0–2, 1–0, 2–2) (OT 0–1) | (Sweden) Frölunda HC | Tissot Arena, Biel/Bienne; Attendance: 5,592 |

Game reference

Jonas Hiller
Goalies
Johan Mattsson
Referees:
Vladimír Pešina
Antonín Jeřábek
Linesmen:
Balazs Kovacs
Marc-Henri Progin

| | 0–1 | 3:08 – (PP) Lasch (Gormley, Hjalmarsson) |
| | 0–2 | 15:36 – Lundqvist (Friberg, Moverare) |
| Ulmer (Gustafsson) – 30:34 | 1–2 |
| Pouliot (Rajala) – 52:08 | 2–2 |
| Schneider (Cunti (PP) – 56:02 | 3–2 |
| | 3–3 | 57:10 – (EAG) Carlsson (Lasch, Lundqvist) |
| | 3–4 | 57:29 – Lennström (Friberg, Lasu) |
| | 3–5 | 65:53 – (PP) Carlsson (Sundström) |

10 min
Penalties
6 min
27
Shots
42

Frölunda HC won 7–6 on Aggregate in Overtime.

| 10 December 2019; 20:00 CET | Red Bull München (Germany) | 0–3 (0–0, 0–1, 0–2) | (Sweden) Djurgårdens IF | Olympia Eishalle, Munich; Attendance: 3,450 |

Game reference

Daniel Fießinger
Goalies
Karri Rämö
Referees:
Daniel Stricker
Anssi Salonen
Linesmen:
Andreas Hofer
Tobias Schwenk

| 0–1 | 22:24 – Nilsson (Ågren, Alsing) |
| 0–2 | 43:48 – (ENG) Östman |
| 0–3 | 56:53 – (ENG) Eriksson (Alsing, Högström) |

8 min
Penalties
6 min
32
Shots
30

Djurgårdens IF won 8–1 on Aggregate.

=== Semi-Finals ===
==== First Leg ====
| 7 January 2020; 18:00 CET | Frölunda HC (Sweden) | 2–3 (0–2, 2–0, 0–1) | (Sweden) Luleå HF | Frölundaborg, Gothenburg; Attendance: 3,564 |

Game reference

Johan Mattsson
Goalies
Joel Lassinantti
Referees:
Robin Šír
Daniel Piechaczek
Linesmen:
Henrik Pihlblad
Andreas Malmqvist

| | 0–1 | 13:48 – Emanuelsson (Kovacs) |
| | 0–2 | 17:16 – (PP 5 ON 3) Sondell (Emanuelsson, Lundkvist) |
| Ekbom (Fagemo, Rosseli Olsen) – 23:27 | 1–2 |
| Stollery (Friberg, Printz) – 34:59 | 2–2 |
| | 2–3 | 53:35 – Connolly (Hållander, Emanuelsson) |

8 min
Penalties
8 min
20
Shots
27

| 7 January 2020; 19:00 CET | Djurgårdens IF (Sweden) | 1–3 (1–1, 0–1, 0–1) | (Czech Republic) Mountfield HK | Hovet, Stockholm; Attendance: 2,383 |

Game reference

Karri Rämö
Goalies
Marek Mazanec
Referees:
Viktor Birin
Stanislav Raming
Linesmen:
Örjan Åhlen
Daniel Persson

| Possler (Alsing) – 2:50 | 1–0 |
| | 1–1 | 4:29 – Nedomlel (Koukal) |
| | 1–2 | 22:15 – Chalupa (Nedomlel, Perret) |
| | 1–3 | 49:39 – Chalupa |

8 min
Penalties
4 min
22
Shots
26

==== Second Leg ====
| 14 January 2020; 18:00 CET | Luleå HF (Sweden) | 1–3 (1–0, 0–1, 0–2) | (Sweden) Frölunda HC | Coop Norrbotten Arena, Luleå; Attendance: 4,305 |

Game reference

Joel Lassinantti
Goalies
Johan Mattsson
Referees:
Kristian Vikman
Mark Lemelin
Linesmen:
Jan Sandström
Emil Yletyinen

| Tyrväinen (Gustavsson, Lundkvist) – 13:41 | 1–0 |
| | 1–1 | 30:59 – (PP) Rakhshani (Lundqvist, Fagemo) |
| | 1–2 | 43:19 – Lundqvist (Mustonen) |
| | 1–3 | 50:35 – Lasch (Carlsson, Rosseli Olsen) |

10 min
Penalties
8 min
23
Shots
29

Frölunda HC won 5–4 on Aggregate.

| 14 January 2020; 18:00 CET | Mountfield HK (Czech Republic) | 3–0 (0–0, 1–0, 2–0) | (Sweden) Djurgårdens IF | ČPP Arena, Hradec Králové; Attendance: 6,161 |

Game reference

Marek Mazanec
Goalies
Niklas Svedberg
Referees:
Manuel Nikolić
Peter Stano
Linesmen:
Jiří Ondráček
Daniel Hynek

| Lev (Chalupa) – 20:53 | 1–0 |
| Nedomlel – 42:07 | 2–0 |
| Jergl (ENG) – 51:34 | 3–0 |

4 min
Penalties
6 min
30
Shots
25

Mountfield HK won 6–1 on Aggregate.

=== Final ===
| 4 February 2020; 18:45 (UTC+1) | Mountfield HK (Czech Republic) | 1–3 (1–3, 0–0, 0–0) | (Sweden) Frölunda HC | ČPP Arena, Hradec Králové; Attendance: 6,890 |

Game reference

Marek Mazanec
Goalies
Johan Mattsson
Referees:
(Finland) Kristian Vikman
(Finland) Mikko Kaukokari
Linesmen:
(Germany) Andreas Hofer
(Netherlands) Joep Leermakers

| Koukal (Cibuļskis, Pavlík) (PP) – 06:53 | 1–0 |
| | 1–1 | 16:29 – Hjalmarsson (Lundqvist, Lasch) (PP) |
| | 1–2 | 18:21 – Friberg (Grönlund) |
| | 1–3 | 19:21 – Sundström (Ekbom, Fagemo) |

10 min
Penalties
8 min
18
Shots
29

== Statistics ==
=== Scoring leaders ===
The following players led the league in points.

| Player | Team | GP | G | A | PTS | PIM | +/– | GWG | PPG | SHG | SOG | S% |
|---|---|---|---|---|---|---|---|---|---|---|---|---|
| (United States) Ryan Lasch | (Sweden) Frölunda HC | 13 | 6 | 16 | 22 | 0 | +5 | 1 | 2 | 0 | 37 | 16.22% |
| (United States) Rhett Rakhshani | (Sweden) Frölunda HC | 12 | 3 | 13 | 16 | 6 | -5 | 0 | 3 | 0 | 24 | 12.50% |
| (Sweden) Olle Alsing | (Sweden) Djurgårdens IF | 12 | 3 | 12 | 15 | 14 | +3 | 1 | 2 | 0 | 23 | 13.04% |
| (Sweden) Samuel Fagemo | (Sweden) Frölunda HC | 11 | 7 | 6 | 13 | 4 | +10 | 1 | 0 | 0 | 41 | 17.07% |
| (Finland) Arttu Ilomäki | (Sweden) Luleå HF | 11 | 6 | 7 | 13 | 8 | +9 | 1 | 3 | 0 | 20 | 30.00% |
| (Czech Republic) Milan Gulaš | (Czech Republic) HC Plzeň | 6 | 8 | 4 | 12 | 2 | +4 | 3 | 3 | 0 | 20 | 40.00% |
| (Sweden) Joel Lundqvist | (Sweden) Frölunda HC | 12 | 7 | 5 | 12 | 8 | +6 | 2 | 4 | 0 | 31 | 22.58% |
| (Sweden) Robin Kovacs | (Sweden) Luleå HF | 12 | 6 | 6 | 12 | 2 | +5 | 2 | 1 | 0 | 25 | 24.00% |
| (Sweden) Simon Hjalmarsson | (Sweden) Frölunda HC | 12 | 6 | 5 | 11 | 4 | +4 | 0 | 6 | 0 | 38 | 15.79% |
| (Sweden) Nils Lundkvist | (Sweden) Luleå HF | 12 | 2 | 9 | 11 | 6 | +4 | 1 | 0 | 0 | 23 | 8.70% |

=== Leading goaltenders ===
The following goaltenders led the league in save percentage, provided that they have played at least 40% of their team's minutes.

| Player | Team | GP | W | L | SV | GA | SV% | GAA | SO | MIN |
|---|---|---|---|---|---|---|---|---|---|---|
| (Germany) Danny aus den Birken | (Germany) EHC Red Bull München | 4 | 4 | 0 | 121 | 5 | 96.03% | 1.22 | 1 | 256 |
| (Switzerland) Luca Hollenstein | (Switzerland) EV Zug | 5 | 3 | 1 | 102 | 5 | 95.33% | 0.98 | 1 | 305 |
| (Czech Republic) Dominik Hrachovina | (Switzerland) HC Ambrì-Piotta | 4 | 3 | 1 | 120 | 6 | 95.24% | 1.51 | 1 | 238 |
| (Switzerland) Jonas Hiller | (Switzerland) EHC Biel-Bienne | 4 | 2 | 2 | 153 | 8 | 95.03% | 1.96 | 1 | 245 |
| (Switzerland) Niklas Schlegel | (Switzerland) SC Bern | 5 | 2 | 3 | 146 | 8 | 94.81% | 1.73 | 0 | 278 |

=== Home Game and Overall ===
As of 4 February 2020

| Pos. | Team | Regular season | | Playoffs | | Overall | | | 2018–19 average |
| Pos. | Team | Matches | Attendance | Matches | Attendance | Matches | Total | Average | 2018–19 average |
|---|---|---|---|---|---|---|---|---|---|
| 1 | (Germany) Adler Mannheim | 3 | 24,567 | 1 | 3,611 | 4 | 28,178 | 7,045 | – |
| 2 | (Germany) Augsburger Panther | 3 | 16,038 | 1 | 5,580 | 4 | 21,618 | 5,405 | – |
| 3 | (Switzerland) SC Bern | 3 | 16,884 | 1 | 4,019 | 4 | 20,903 | 5,226 | 9,780 |
| 4 | (Czech Republic) HC Plzeň | 3 | 14,228 | 1 | 5,360 | 4 | 19,588 | 4,897 | 4,229 |
| 5 | (Finland) Kärpät | 3 | 13,409 | 0 | – | 3 | 13,409 | 4,470 | 3,338 |
| 6 | (Czech Republic) Bílí Tygři Liberec | 3 | 13,070 | 0 | – | 3 | 13,070 | 4,357 | – |
| 7 | (Switzerland) EV Zug | 3 | 13,304 | 2 | 8,009 | 5 | 21,313 | 4,263 | 4,140 |
| 8 | (Finland) Tappara | 3 | 11,210 | 1 | 5,275 | 4 | 16,485 | 4,121 | 3,575 |
| 9 | (Switzerland) EHC Biel-Bienne | 3 | 9,112 | 2 | 10,224 | 5 | 19,336 | 3,867 | – |
| 10 | (Czech Republic) Oceláři Třinec | 3 | 11,543 | 0 | – | 3 | 11,543 | 3,848 | 3,155 |
| 11 | (Sweden) Färjestad BK | 3 | 10,911 | 1 | 4,423 | 3 | 15,334 | 3,834 | – |
| 12 | (Northern Ireland) Belfast Giants | 3 | 11,449 | 0 | — | 3 | 11,449 | 3,816 | – |
| 13 | (Czech Republic) Mountfield HK | 3 | 8,074 | 4 | 18,201 | 7 | 26,275 | 3,754 | 2,271 |
| 14 | (Switzerland) HC Ambrì-Piotta | 3 | 10,845 | 0 | — | 3 | 10,845 | 3,615 | – |
| 15 | (Sweden) Frölunda HC | 3 | 10,743 | 3 | 10,218 | 6 | 20,961 | 3,494 | 3,902 |
| 16 | (Belarus) Yunost Minsk | 3 | 10,441 | 1 | 3,243 | 4 | 13,684 | 3,421 | 4,518 |
| 17 | (Finland) Pelicans | 3 | 10,137 | 0 | — | 3 | 10,137 | 3,379 | – |
| 18 | (Germany) Red Bull München | 3 | 9,200 | 2 | 7,570 | 5 | 16,770 | 3,354 | 3,159 |
| 19 | (Austria) EC KAC | 3 | 9,921 | 0 | – | 3 | 9,921 | 3,307 | – |
| 20 | (Sweden) Luleå HF | 3 | 9,580 | 3 | 9,425 | 6 | 19,005 | 3,168 | – |
| 21 | (Austria) Vienna Capitals | 3 | 9,400 | 0 | — | 3 | 9,400 | 3,133 | 2,667 |
| 22 | (Finland) HPK | 3 | 9,014 | 0 | – | 3 | 9,014 | 3,005 | – |
| 23 | (France) Brûleurs de Loups | 3 | 8,074 | 0 | – | 3 | 8,074 | 2,691 | – |
| 24 | (Switzerland) Lausanne HC | 3 | 6,876 | 2 | 6,471 | 5 | 13,347 | 2,669 | – |
| 25 | (Wales) Cardiff Devils | 3 | 8,006 | 0 | — | 3 | 8,006 | 2,669 | 2,441 |
| 26 | (Austria) Graz 99ers | 3 | 7,633 | 0 | – | 3 | 7,633 | 2,544 | – |
| 27 | (Sweden) Djurgårdens IF | 3 | 7,391 | 3 | 6,911 | 6 | 14,302 | 2,384 | 2,318 |
| 28 | (Poland) GKS Tychy | 3 | 6,902 | 0 | — | 3 | 6,902 | 2,301 | 2,165 |
| 29 | (Sweden) Skellefteå AIK | 3 | 6,394 | 1 | 1,904 | 4 | 8,298 | 2,075 | 1,769 |
| 30 | (Slovakia) HC '05 Banská Bystrica | 3 | 4,819 | 0 | — | 3 | 4,819 | 1,606 | 1,837 |
| 31 | (Norway) Frisk Asker | 3 | 4,097 | 0 | — | 3 | 4,097 | 1,366 | – |
| 32 | (Denmark) Rungsted Seier Capital | 3 | 3,070 | 0 | — | 3 | 3,070 | 1,023 | – |
| Tournament total | | 96 | 326,342 | 29 | 110,444 | 125 | 436,786 | 3,494 | 3,454 |

Source: Champions Hockey League.
