= Petr Koukal =

Petr Koukal may refer to:

- Petr Koukal (badminton) (born 1985), Czech badminton player
- Petr Koukal (ice hockey) (born 1982), Czech ice hockey player
