= Anders Grönlund =

Swedish ice hockey player

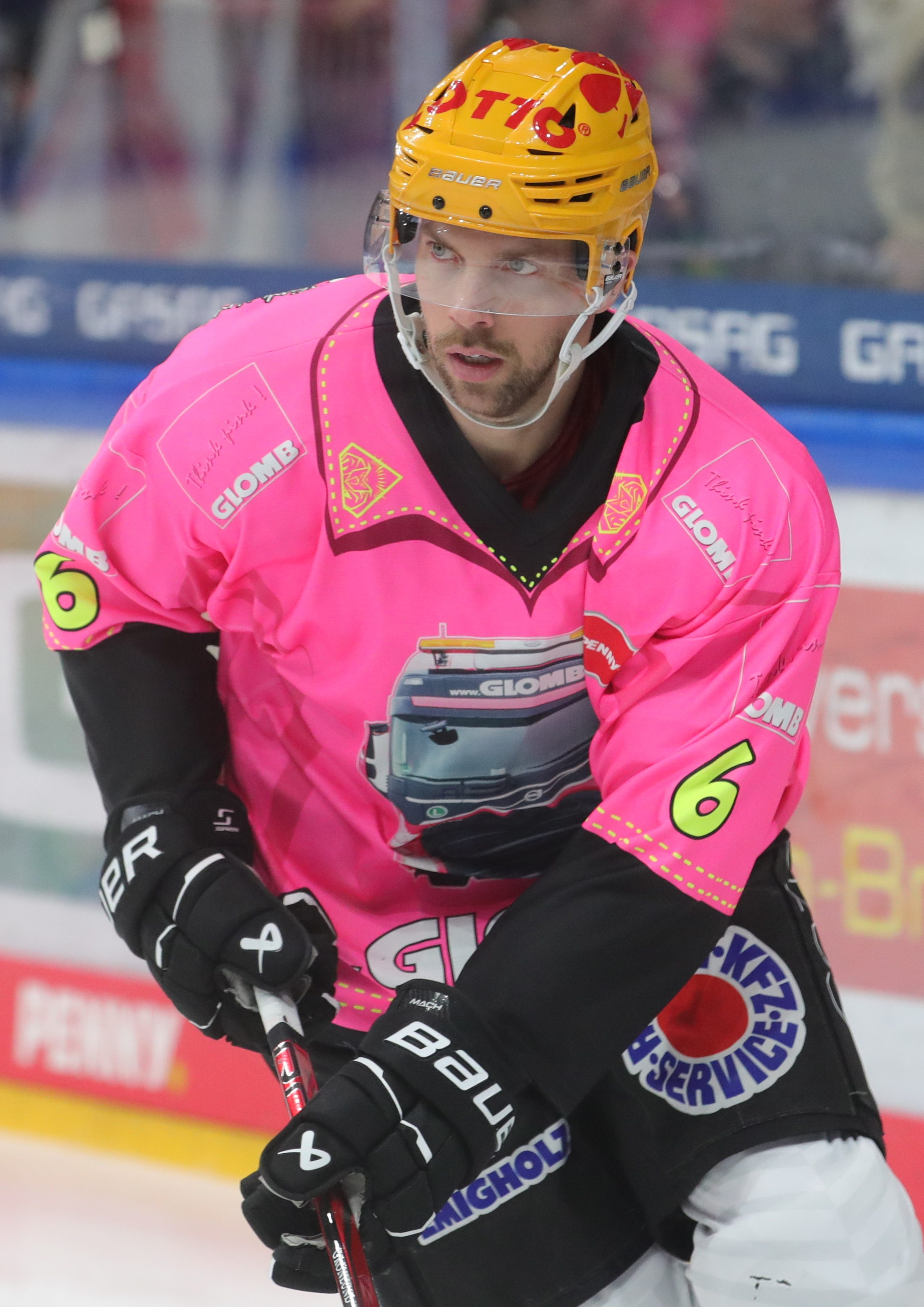
- Grönlund in 2023
- Born: 3 January 1989 (age 37) Piteå, Sweden
- Height: 6 ft 1 in (185 cm)
- Weight: 196 lb (89 kg; 14 st 0 lb)
- Position: Defense
- Shoots: Left
- DEL team Former teams: Fischtown Pinguins; Rungsted Seier Capital; Lillehammer IK; Frölunda HC
- Playing career: 2008–present

Anders Grönlund (born 3 January 1989) is a professional Swedish ice hockey player. He currently plays for Fischtown Pinguins in the Deutsche Eishockey Liga (DEL), having previously played with Frölunda HC in the Swedish Hockey League (SHL). His youth team was Öjeby IF.
