= Mats Rosseli Olsen =

Norwegian ice hockey player

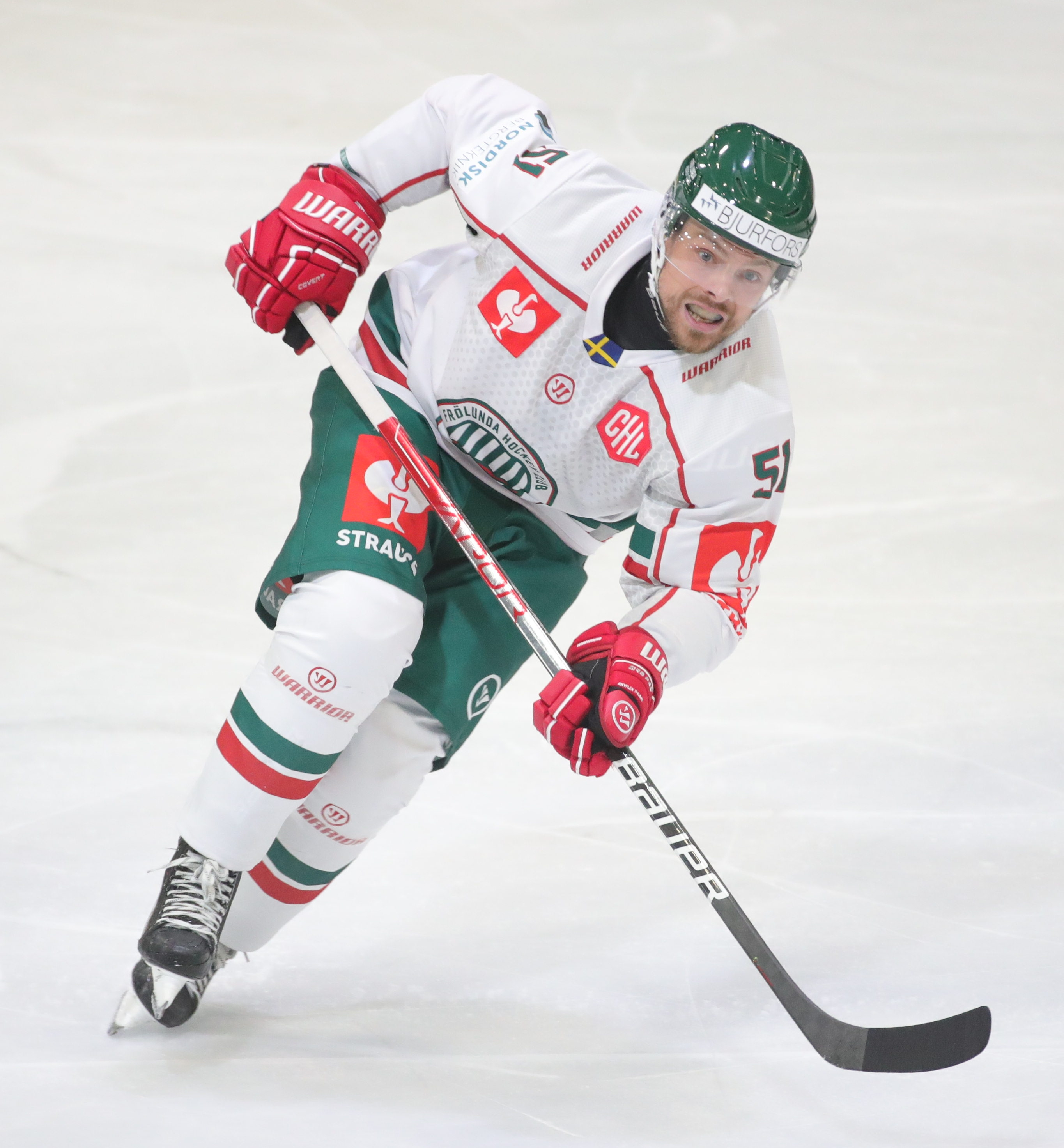
- Born: April 29, 1991 (age 34) Oslo, Norway
- Height: 5 ft 11 in (180 cm)
- Weight: 179 lb (81 kg; 12 st 11 lb)
- Position: Left wing
- Shoots: Left
- SHL team Former teams: Frölunda HC; Furuset Ishockey; Vålerenga
- National team: Norway
- Playing career: 2008–present

Mats Rosseli Olsen (born April 29, 1991) is a Norwegian professional ice hockey forward, currently playing for Frölunda HC in the Swedish Hockey League (SHL).

== Playing career ==
Mats Rosseli Olsen started his professional career in 2008 in the Norwegian GET-league, playing for Furuset, where he grew up. In the 2008–09 season, he noted 20 points in 44 games. In 2009, he joined Vålerenga. After two and a half seasons in Vålerenga, he signed a one-and-a-half-year deal with Frölunda HC of the Swedish Elitserien on January 28, 2012. Rosseli Olsen has also represented the Norwegian national team.

== Career statistics ==
=== Regular season and playoffs ===
			Regular season					Playoffs
Season	Team	League	GP	G	A	Pts	PIM	GP	G	A	Pts	PIM
2007–08	Furuset Ishockey II	NOR.2	12	1	3	4	12	—	—	—	—	—
2008–09	Furuset Ishockey	NOR	44	10	10	20	46	—	—	—	—	—
2008–09	Furuset Ishockey II	NOR.2	4	2	2	4	4	—	—	—	—	—
2009–10	Vålerenga	NOR	38	1	7	8	24	10	3	1	4	27
2009–10	Vålerenga II	NOR.2	1	1	1	2	12	—	—	—	—	—
2010–11	Vålerenga	NOR	32	8	15	23	55	5	1	1	2	4
2011–12	Vålerenga	NOR	35	17	30	47	52	—	—	—	—	—
2011–12	Frölunda HC	SEL	11	1	0	1	0	6	1	0	1	4
2012–13	Frölunda HC	SEL	54	3	6	9	8	6	0	0	0	6
2013–14	Frölunda HC	SHL	48	6	9	15	40	1	0	0	0	0
2014–15	Frölunda HC	SHL	40	7	8	15	35	13	1	4	5	2
2015–16	Frölunda HC	SHL	47	4	16	20	55	16	4	4	8	12
2016–17	Frölunda HC	SHL	50	7	7	14	30	14	1	2	3	4
2017–18	Frölunda HC	SHL	46	5	9	14	38	6	0	2	2	4
2018–19	Frölunda HC	SHL	47	6	9	15	24	16	2	5	7	8
2019–20	Frölunda HC	SHL	49	4	11	15	18	—	—	—	—	—
2020–21	Frölunda HC	SHL	48	7	9	16	45	6	2	0	2	4
2021–22	Frölunda HC	SHL	51	4	10	14	37	9	0	2	2	4
NOR totals			149	36	62	98	177	15	4	2	6	31
SHL totals			491	54	94	148	330	93	11	19	30	48

=== International ===
Year	Team	Event	GP	G	A	Pts	PIM
2008	Norway	WJC18 D1	5	0	1	1	14
2009	Norway	WJC D1	5	1	1	2	10
2009	Norway	WJC18	6	1	5	6	10
2010	Norway	WJC D1	5	0	2	2	2
2011	Norway	WJC	6	0	1	1	18
2012	Norway	WC	5	0	0	0	0
2013	Norway	WC	2	0	0	0	0
2014	Norway	OG	4	0	0	0	0
2015	Norway	WC	7	1	1	2	2
2016	Norway	WC	7	1	3	4	18
2016	Norway	OGQ	3	0	0	0	2
2017	Norway	WC	6	0	0	0	0
2018	Norway	OG	5	0	1	1	6
2019	Norway	WC	2	0	0	0	0
2021	Norway	WC	7	2	4	6	2
2021	Norway	OGQ	3	1	3	4	0
Junior totals			27	2	10	12	54
Senior totals			51	5	12	17	30

== Awards and honors ==
Award	Year
SHL
Le Mat Trophy (Frölunda HC)	2016, 2019
CHL
Champions (Frölunda HC)	2016, 2017, 2019, 2020
