= Daniel Sondell =

Swedish ice hockey player

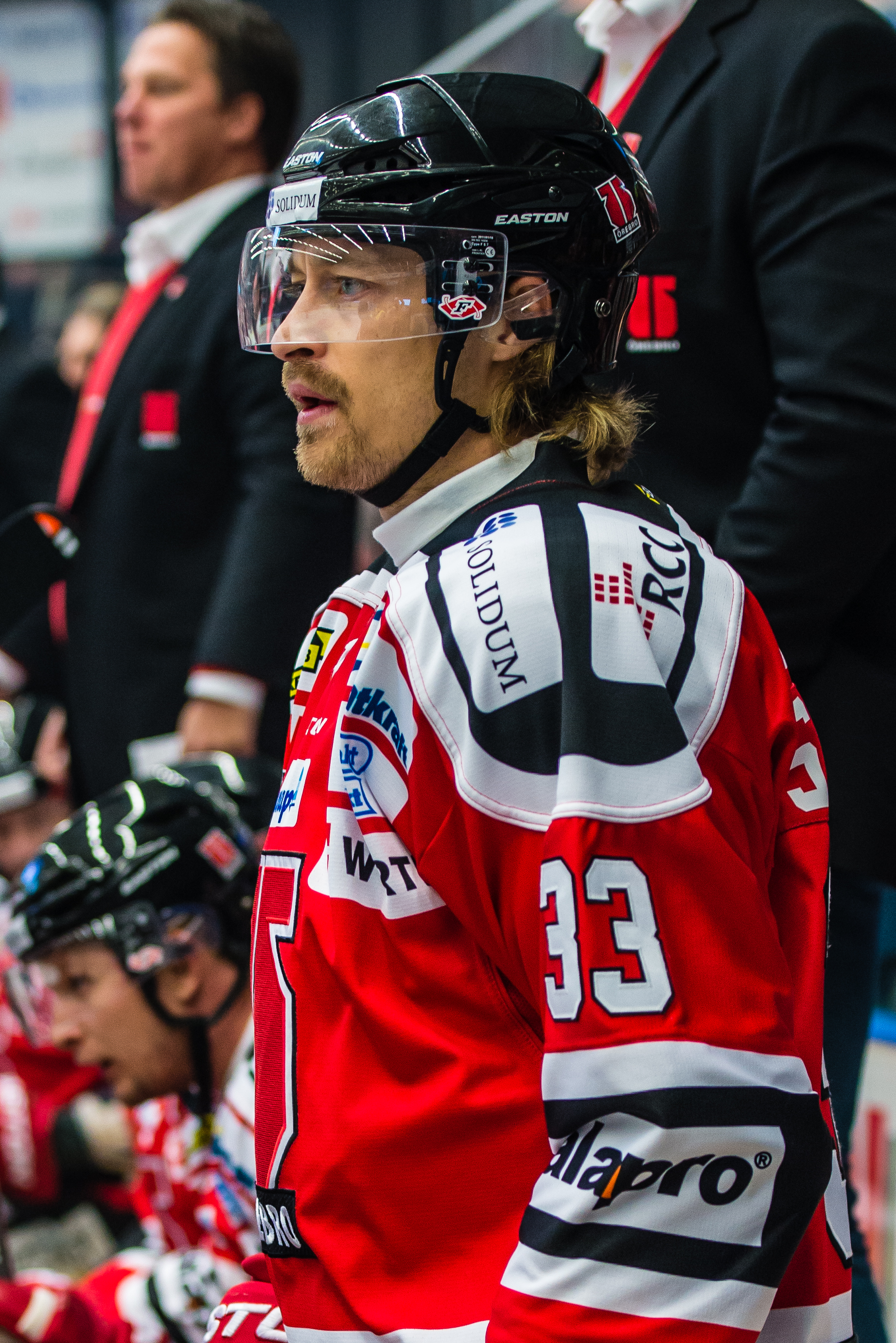
- Born: March 1, 1984 (age 41); Umeå, Sweden
- Height: 6 ft 0 in (183 cm)
- Weight: 183 lb (83 kg; 13 st 1 lb)
- Position: Defence
- Shot: Left
- Played for: Skellefteå AIK; Rögle BK; Modo Hockey; SaiPa; Örebro HK; EV Zug; HC Lugano; EC Red Bull Salzburg; Luleå HF
- Playing career: 2003–2022

Daniel Sondell (born March 1, 1984) is a Swedish former professional ice hockey defenceman who most notably played in the Swedish Hockey League (SHL).

== Playing career ==
A product of IF Björklöven, Sondell saw his first minutes in the Swedish second division HockeyAllsvenskan with the club's men's team during the 2003-04 campaign. In 2005, he joined Skellefteå AIK and helped the team win promotion to the top-flight Swedish Hockey League (SHL) in his first year. After two years with the club, he joined Rögle BK in 2007 and again moved up from HockeyAllsvenskan to the SHL in 2008. He left Rögle following a two-year stint.

After kicking off the 2009-10 campaign with the SHL team Modo Hockey, Sondell headed to Finnish Liiga club SaiPa midway through the season. He remained with the team until the end of the 2010-11 season and then signed with Rögle BK for a second stint. For a third time, Sondell helped a team earn promotion to the SHL, and it was the second time with Rögle. He transferred to Örebro HK before the 2013–14 season, where he spent a single season.

In 2014, Sondell took up an offer from Swiss National League A team EV Zug and found success there. In both years wearing a Zug uniform, he was named NLA Defenseman of the Year. He played a total of 101 NLA contests for Zug, scoring ten goals and dealing out 65 assists. In Champions Hockey League play, Sondell amassed two goals and five assists for EVZ in nine outings over two campaigns. In May 2016, he signed a deal with fellow NLA side HC Lugano. On December 20, 2016, he transferred to Austrian powerhouse EC Red Bull Salzburg.

== International play ==
Sondell presented Sweden's men's national team at three games of the 2009–10 Euro Hockey Tour.
