= Arttu Ilomäki =

Finnish ice hockey player

- Born: 12 June 1991 (age 33); Tampere, Finland
- Height: 6 ft 0 in (183 cm)
- Weight: 194 lb (88 kg; 13 st 12 lb)
- Position: Forward
- Shoots: Right
- Liiga team Former teams: HC TPS; Tappara; Lukko; KalPa [[Luleå HF]] HC TPS
- National team: Finland
- Playing career: 2010–present

Arttu Ilomäki (born 12 June 1991) is a Finnish professional ice hockey forward who currently plays for HC Kometa Brno.

== Playing career ==
Ilomäki began his youth and professional Liiga career with Tappara, although he has spent periods on loan with teams such as LeKi of Mestis. He has also played for KalPa and Lukko of Liiga.

Following the 2018–19 season, playing 9 years in the Liiga, Ilomäki left as a free agent to sign his first contract abroad, agreeing to a two-year contract with Swedish club, Luleå HF of the SHL on April 24, 2019.

== Career statistics ==
=== Regular season and playoffs ===
			Regular season					Playoffs
Season	Team	League	GP	G	A	Pts	PIM	GP	G	A	Pts	PIM
2009–10	Tappara	Jr. A	41	6	15	21	28	—	—	—	—	—
2010–11	Tappara	Jr. A	35	20	24	44	52	—	—	—	—	—
2010–11	Tappara	SM-l	2	0	1	1	0	—	—	—	—	—
2011–12	Tappara	Jr. A	41	21	34	55	36	—	—	—	—	—
2011–12	Tappara	SM-l	14	4	7	11	0	—	—	—	—	—
2011–12	LeKi	Mestis	4	0	2	2	0	—	—	—	—	—
2012–13	Lukko	SM-l	46	2	6	8	8	3	0	0	0	0
2013–14	Tappara	Liiga	18	1	1	2	2	—	—	—	—	—
2013–14	LeKi	Mestis	25	12	24	36	6	—	—	—	—	—
2013–14	KalPa	Liiga	21	4	7	11	4	—	—	—	—	—
2014–15	KalPa	Liiga	46	4	17	21	8	1	0	0	0	0
2015–16	Tappara	Liiga	50	15	18	33	10	14	0	2	2	0
2016–17	Tappara	Liiga	23	2	5	7	6	—	—	—	—	—
2016–17	KalPa	Liiga	31	6	15	21	6	18	2	6	8	2
2017–18	Lukko	Liiga	49	13	24	37	45	2	0	0	0	0
2018–19	Lukko	Liiga	60	13	32	45	28	7	3	3	6	4
2019–20	Luleå HF	SHL	45	6	17	23	22	—	—	—	—	—
2020–21	Luleå HF	SHL	35	6	11	17	18	—	—	—	—	—
2020–21	HV71	SHL	15	3	1	4	0	—	—	—	—	—
2021–22	Lukko	Liiga	54	12	31	43	14	7	0	2	2	2
2022–23	TPS	Liiga	49	17	27	44	49	3	0	1	1	2
2023–24	KooKoo	Liiga	58	11	18	29	18	—	—	—	—	—
2024–25	HC Energie Karlovy Vary	Extraliga	26	3	10	13	13	—	—	—	—	—
2024–25	HC Kometa Brno	Extraliga	12	2	5	7	4	18	7	3	10	6
Liiga totals			414	76	164	240	131	52	5	13	18	8
SHL totals			95	15	29	44	40	—	—	—	—	—

Medal record

Ice hockey

Representing Finland

World Championships
Gold medal – first place	2019 Slovakia	

=== International ===
Year	Team	Event	Result	GP	G	A	Pts	PIM
2019	Finland	WC	1st place, gold medalist(s)	5	1	1	2	0
Senior totals				5	1	1	2	0
