= Richard Nedomlel =

Czech ice hockey player (born 1993)

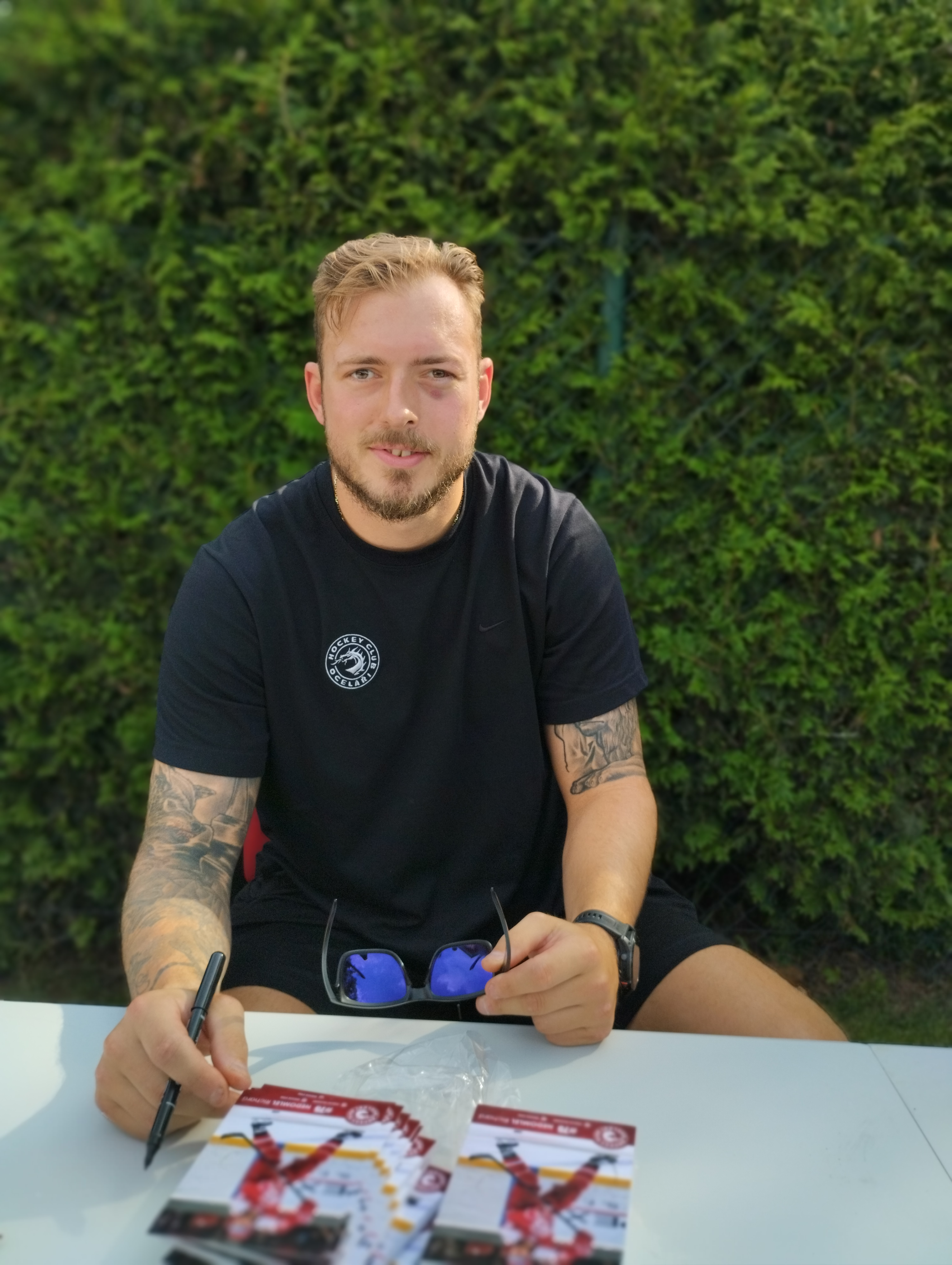
- Born: July 1, 1993 (age 33) Jablonec nad Nisou, Czech Republic
- Height: 6 ft 4 in (193 cm)
- Weight: 225 lb (102 kg; 16 st 1 lb)
- Position: Defense
- Shoots: Left
- ELH team Former teams: HC Oceláři Třinec; HC Sparta Praha; BK Mladá Boleslav; Mountfield HK; Bílí Tygři Liberec
- NHL draft: 175th overall, 2011; Detroit Red Wings
- Playing career: 2013–present

Richard Nedomlel (born July 1, 1993) is a Czech professional ice hockey defenceman for HC Oceláři Třinec of the Czech Extraliga. Nedomlel was drafted 175th overall by the Detroit Red Wings in the 2011 NHL entry draft.

== Playing career ==
=== Junior ===
Nedomlel was drafted 31st overall by the Swift Current Broncos in the 2010 CHL Import Draft. During the 2010–11 season, he recorded 10 assists in 66 games for the Broncos. During the 2011–12 season, he recorded 10 goals and 36 assists in 72 games. He was one of only two players to play in all 72 games. During the 2012–13 season, he was the second-leading scorer among Swift Current defenceman, recording seven goals and 21 assists in 72 games. During the playoffs he recorded one assist in five games.

=== Professional ===
On April 5, 2013, the Detroit Red Wings signed Nedomlel to a three-year, entry-level contract. During the 2013–14 season, in his first professional season, Nedomlel spent most of the season with the Toledo Walleye of the ECHL, where he recorded eight goals and 10 assists in 60 games. He also appeared in three games for the Grand Rapids Griffins of the American Hockey League (AHL).

During the 2014–15 season, Nedomlel recorded three goals and 11 assists in 49 games for the Walleye. The Walleye finished first in the Eastern Conference and won the Brabham Cup. During the 2015 Kelly Cup playoffs, he recorded two assists in 12 games, helping the Walleye reach the conference finals. Nedomlel began the 2015–16 season with the Griffins where he appeared in two games, accounting for a plus-one rating and 20 penalty minutes. He also appeared in 10 games for the Walleye, where he recorded two assists.

On January 15, 2016, the Red Wings traded Nedomlel to the St. Louis Blues in exchange for future considerations. He was reassigned to the Chicago Wolves, where he recorded two assists in 12 games. On March 16, 2016, he was assigned to the Quad City Mallards, where he played in nine games.

During the 2016–17 season, Nedomlel returned to his hometown of Prague and joined HC Sparta Praha of the Czech Extraliga (ELH), where he recorded four assists in 41 games.

== Career statistics ==
			Regular season					Playoffs
Season	Team	League	GP	G	A	Pts	PIM	GP	G	A	Pts	PIM
2010–11	Swift Current Broncos	WHL	66	0	10	10	107	—	—	—	—	—
2011–12	Swift Current Broncos	WHL	72	10	36	46	83	—	—	—	—	—
2012–13	Swift Current Broncos	WHL	72	7	21	28	105	5	0	1	1	2
2013–14	Toledo Walleye	ECHL	60	8	10	18	150	—	—	—	—	—
2013–14	Grand Rapids Griffins	AHL	65	10	21	31	31	—	—	—	—	—
2014–15	Toledo Walleye	ECHL	49	3	11	14	56	12	0	2	2	10
2015–16	Grand Rapids Griffins	AHL	2	0	0	0	20	—	—	—	—	—
2015–16	Toledo Walleye	ECHL	10	0	2	2	14	—	—	—	—	—
2015–16	Chicago Wolves	AHL	12	0	2	2	4	—	—	—	—	—
2015–16	Quad City Mallards	ECHL	9	0	0	0	8	3	0	0	0	4
2016–17	HC Sparta Praha	ELH	41	0	4	4	48	1	0	0	0	41
2017–18	HC Sparta Praha	ELH	34	0	2	2	30	—	—	—	—	—
2017–18	BK Mladá Boleslav	ELH	4	0	0	0	0	—	—	—	—	—
2018–19	Mountfield HK	ELH	41	0	4	4	22	4	1	0	1	0
2019–20	Mountfield HK	ELH	49	2	3	5	102	2	0	0	0	0
2020–21	Mountfield HK	ELH	49	3	4	7	56	7	0	3	3	10
2021–22	Mountfield HK	ELH	56	4	5	9	16	5	0	1	1	2
2022–23	Mountfield HK	ELH	16	0	0	0	4	—	—	—	—	—
2022–23	Bílí Tygři Liberec	ELH	35	4	2	6	14	10	0	0	0	4
2023–24	HC Oceláři Třinec	ELH	52	0	4	4	12	21	2	2	4	2
ELH totals			377	13	22	35	304	50	3	6	9	59
