= Öjeby IF =

Swedish sports club

- Full name: Öjeby idrottsförening
- Sport: soccer handball ice hockey skiing
- Founded: 2 November 1922
- Based in: Piteå, Sweden
- Arena: Björklunda IP

Öjeby IF is a sports club in Öjebyn in Piteå, Sweden, established on 2 November 1922. The women's soccer team played in the Swedish top division in 1978.
