= Kalle Östman =

Swedish ice hockey player

- Born: 20 May 1994 (age 32) Falun, Sweden
- Height: 5 ft 10 in (178 cm)
- Weight: 190 lb (86 kg; 13 st 8 lb)
- Position: Forward
- Shoots: Left
- SHL team Former teams: Leksands IF; Djurgårdens IF; Malmö Redhawks
- Playing career: 2014–present

Kalle Östman (born 20 May 1994) is a Swedish professional ice hockey player currently playing for Leksands IF of the Swedish Hockey League (SHL).

Östman first played in the SHL with Djurgårdens IF. Upon two season with Djurgårdens, Östman left as a free agent and signed a two-year contract with the Malmö Redhawks on 21 April 2021.
