= Viktor Ekbom =

Swedish ice hockey player

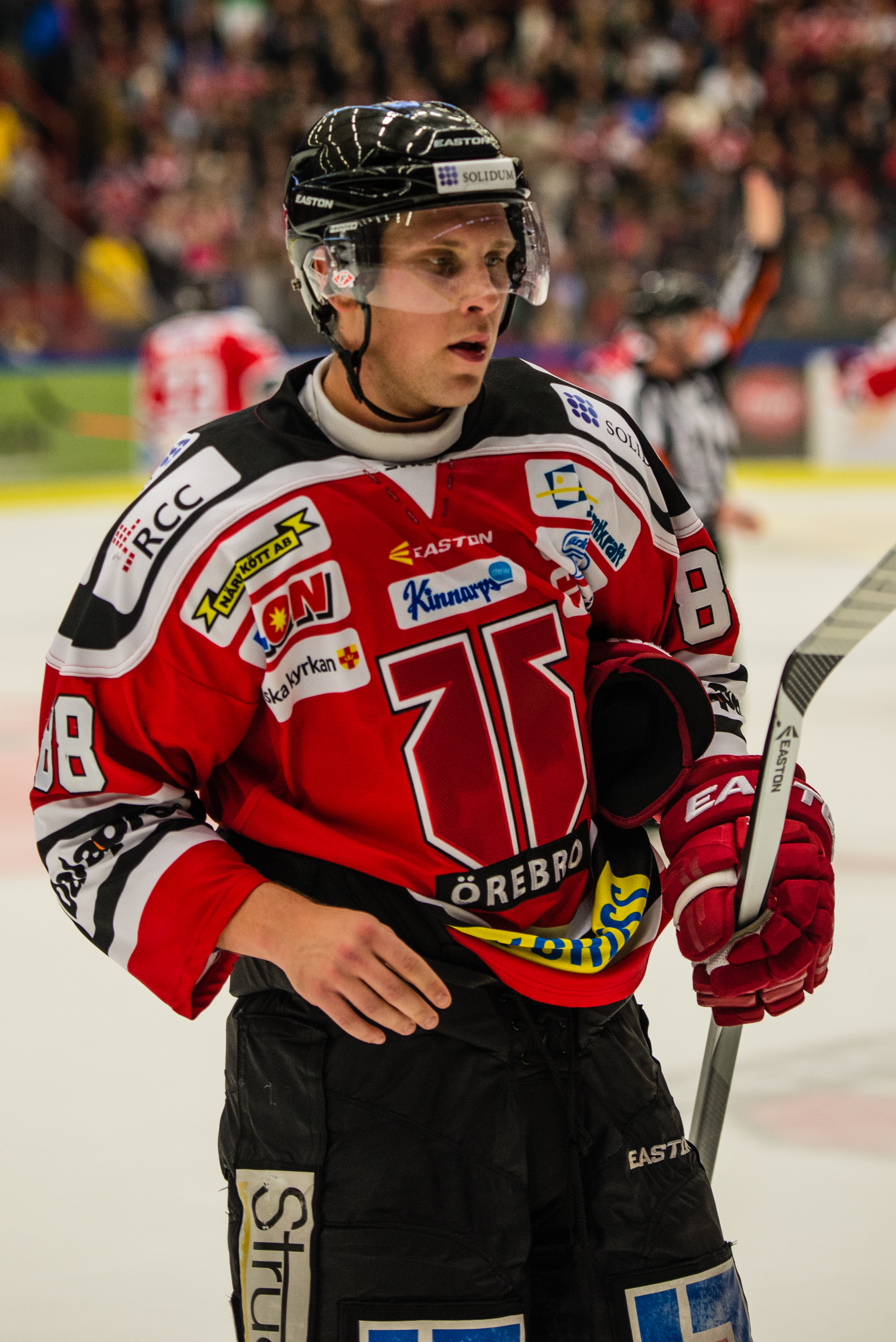
- Born: 1 June 1989 (age 37) Falköping, Sweden
- Height: 6 ft 3 in (191 cm)
- Weight: 212 lb (96 kg; 15 st 2 lb)
- Position: Defence
- Shot: Left
- Played for: Linköpings HC; WBS Penguins; Tappara; EHC München; Örebro HK; Frölunda HC
- NHL draft: 181st overall, 2009; Pittsburgh Penguins
- Playing career: 2008–2022

Viktor Ekbom (born 1 June 1989) is a Swedish former professional ice hockey defenseman who played in the Swedish Hockey League (SHL).

== Playing career ==
Ekbom was selected by the Pittsburgh Penguins in the 6th round (181st overall) of the 2009 NHL entry draft.

He started the 2010–11 season with Linköpings HC in the Elitserien, and finished the remainder of the season on an amateur try-out with the Wilkes-Barre/Scranton Penguins, the AHL affiliate of the Pittsburgh Penguins. Ekbom went scoreless in three games. Before signing a try-out in North America, Ekbom was signed to a two-year contract starting from the 2011–12 season with Finnish club Tappara of the SM-liiga on 25 March 2011.

His rights were relinquished by the Penguins on 31 May 2011, making him eligible to re-enter the 2011 NHL entry draft.

On 15 June 2012, Ekbom left Tappara to sign a one-year contract with EHC München of the German DEL. During the 2012–13 season, Ekbom contributed with 4 goals and 10 points in 38 games for Munchen.

On 1 May 2013, upon completion of his contract with EHC München Ekbom returned to his native Sweden and signed a one-year deal with Örebro HK of the SHL.

Following completion of the 2021–22 season, his fourth with Frölunda HC, Ekbom announced his retirement from professional hockey on 12 July 2022.

== Career statistics ==
=== Regular season and playoffs ===
			Regular season					Playoffs
Season	Team	League	GP	G	A	Pts	PIM	GP	G	A	Pts	PIM
2007–08	IK Oskarshamn	Allsv	9	0	0	0	2	—	—	—	—	—
2007–08	Linköpings HC	J20	25	3	7	10	10	5	0	2	2	6
2008–09	IK Oskarshamn	Allsv	29	2	4	6	22	—	—	—	—	—
2008–09	Linköpings HC	SEL	14	0	1	1	6	5	0	0	0	2
2009–10	Linköpings HC	SEL	47	0	2	2	16	12	0	0	0	8
2010–11	Linköpings HC	SEL	49	0	6	6	10	1	0	0	0	0
2010–11	Wilkes-Barre/Scranton Penguins	AHL	3	0	0	0	0	—	—	—	—	—
2011–12	Tappara	SM-l	44	1	3	4	44	—	—	—	—	—
2012–13	EHC München	DEL	38	4	6	10	8	—	—	—	—	—
2013–14	Örebro HK	SHL	53	2	4	6	22	—	—	—	—	—
2014–15	Örebro HK	SHL	55	1	12	13	30	6	0	1	1	0
2015–16	Örebro HK	SHL	48	1	8	9	16	2	0	0	0	0
2016–17	Örebro HK	SHL	34	1	4	5	20	—	—	—	—	—
2017–18	Örebro HK	SHL	48	4	6	10	53	—	—	—	—	—
2018–19	Frölunda HC	SHL	46	0	5	5	32	15	0	1	1	8
2019–20	Frölunda HC	SHL	49	5	7	12	63	—	—	—	—	—
2020–21	Frölunda HC	SHL	33	0	4	4	18	7	0	0	0	2
2021–22	Frölunda HC	SHL	26	0	4	4	4	9	0	0	0	2
SHL totals			502	14	63	77	290	57	0	2	2	22

=== International ===
Year	Team	Event	Result	GP	G	A	Pts	PIM
2009	Sweden	WJC	2nd place, silver medalist(s)	6	0	2	2	2
Junior totals				6	0	2	2	2

== Awards and honours ==
Award	Year
CHL
Champions (Frölunda HC)	2019
SHL
Le Mat Trophy (Frölunda HC)	2019
