= Marek Mazanec =

Czech ice hockey player

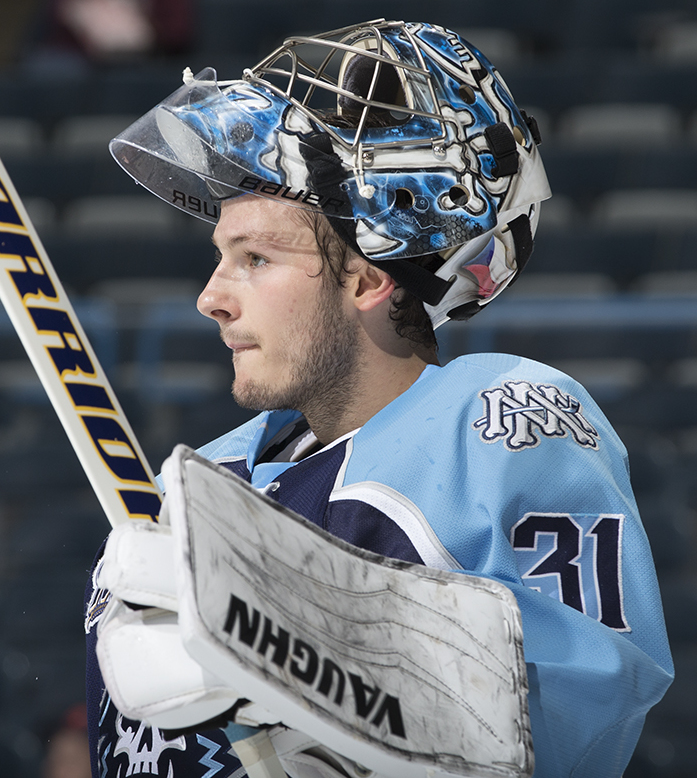
- Mazanec with the Milwaukee Admirals in 2015
- Born: 18 July 1991 (age 35) Písek, Czechoslovakia
- Height: 6 ft 4 in (193 cm)
- Weight: 187 lb (85 kg; 13 st 5 lb)
- Position: Goaltender
- Catches: Right
- ELH team Former teams: HC Oceláři Třinec; Mountfield HK; HC Plzeň; Nashville Predators; Slovan Bratislava
- NHL draft: 179th overall, 2012; Nashville Predators
- Playing career: 2010–present

Marek Mazanec (born 18 July 1991) is a Czech professional ice hockey goaltender currently playing for HC Oceláři Třinec of the Czech Extraliga (ELH). Mazanec has previously played for the Nashville Predators, who selected him in the sixth round, 179th overall, of the 2012 NHL entry draft.

== Playing career ==
Mazanec played at the junior level with IHC Písek, before at 14 moving to Plzeň, where he continued his junior career. Beginning in the 2009–10 season, he played at the senior level in the professional Czech Extraliga.

On 3 May 2013, the Nashville Predators of the NHL signed Mazanec to a two-year, entry-level contract. He began the 2013–14 season with the Predators' American Hockey League (AHL) affiliate, the Milwaukee Admirals.

On 8 November 2013, Mazanec made his NHL debut with Nashville, playing 51:37 and allowing two goals on 24 shots after replacing starter Carter Hutton in a game against the Winnipeg Jets. After 10 games with the Predators he posted a .932 save percentage and was named NHL Rookie of the month for November.

On 20 July 2017, Mazanec agreed to a one-year extension to remain with the Predators for his last restricted year under contract. After Mazaenc and multiple other members of the Predators contracted food poisoning after a game against the Detroit Red Wings, Mazanec was sent back to Milwaukee after coach Peter Laviolette was impressed by goaltender Juuse Saros, who had recorded his first career victory over the Pittsburgh Penguins in a 5–1 victory. However under a month later, the Predators and Mazanec agreed not to fulfil his contract, allowing him to leave North America and agree to a one-year contract with Slovak outfit, Slovan Bratislava of the Kontinental Hockey League (KHL), on 14 August 2017.

On 6 December 2017, the New York Rangers signed Mazanec and immediately assigned him to their AHL affiliate, the Hartford Wolf Pack.

In the following 2018–19 season, Mazanec appeared in 20 games for the Wolf Pack posting a record of 7–8–3 along with a .903 save percentage and 3.01 GAA. He was recalled to the Rangers on two occasions however did not feature in a game. On 12 February 2019, the Rangers traded Mazanec to the Vancouver Canucks in exchange for a seventh-round draft pick in 2020. As the Canucks backup, he did not feature in a game, before he was sent for the remainder of the season to AHL affiliate, the Utica Comets.

As an impending unrestricted free agent from the Canucks, Mazanec opted to return to his native Czech Republic, agreeing to a two-year contract with Mountfield HK of the ELH on 27 April 2019. At the 2019 NHL entry draft, the Canucks traded Mazanec's rights, 2019 third-round draft pick and a 2020 conditional first-round pick to the Tampa Bay Lightning in exchange for J. T. Miller on 22 June 2019.

== Career statistics ==
=== Regular season and playoffs ===
			Regular season									Playoffs
Season	Team	League	GP	W	L	T/OT	MIN	GA	SO	GAA	SV%	GP	W	L	MIN	GA	SO	GAA	SV%
2009–10	Plzeň	ELH	1	0	1	0	20	3	0	9.00	.769	—	—	—	—	—	—	—	—
2009–10	HC Klatovy	Czech.2	3	—	—	—	—	—	—	3.24	.889	—	—	—	—	—	—	—	—
2010–11	Plzeň	ELH	15	9	6	0	860	40	1	2.79	.911	—	—	—	—	—	—	—	—
2010–11	IHC Písek	Czech.1	3	2	1	0	180	3	1	1.00	.977	—	—	—	—	—	—	—	—
2011–12	Plzeň	ELH	19	12	7	0	973	48	1	2.96	.900	5	1	4	222	8	0	2.16	.919
2011–12	HC Klatovy	Czech.2	17	—	—	—	—	—	—	3.78	—	6	—	—	—	—	—	3.18	—
2012–13	Plzeň	ELH	21	9	12	0	1255	52	1	2.49	.912	20	12	8	1241	44	2	2.13	.932
2012–13	IHC Písek	Czech.1	12	—	—	—	—	—	—	4.25	.880	—	—	—	—	—	—	—	—
2013–14	Milwaukee Admirals	AHL	31	18	10	3	1866	76	0	2.44	.914	3	0	3	178	9	0	3.03	.898
2013–14	Nashville Predators	NHL	25	8	10	4	1370	64	2	2.80	.902	—	—	—	—	—	—	—	—
2014–15	Milwaukee Admirals	AHL	48	18	18	9	2628	121	4	2.76	.900	—	—	—	—	—	—	—	—
2014–15	Nashville Predators	NHL	2	0	1	0	106	4	0	2.26	.915	—	—	—	—	—	—	—	—
2015–16	Milwaukee Admirals	AHL	39	19	15	5	2349	96	4	2.45	.912	1	0	1	56	4	0	4.26	.846
2016–17	Nashville Predators	NHL	4	0	2	0	178	14	0	4.72	.839	—	—	—	—	—	—	—	—
2016–17	Milwaukee Admirals	AHL	47	27	17	3	2789	123	3	2.65	.912	3	0	3	198	10	0	3.03	.906
2017–18	HC Slovan Bratislava	KHL	23	4	15	2	1290	73	0	3.40	.899	—	—	—	—	—	—	—	—
2017–18	Hartford Wolf Pack	AHL	20	11	6	1	1153	57	0	2.97	.905	—	—	—	—	—	—	—	—
2018–19	Hartford Wolf Pack	AHL	20	7	8	3	1155	83	0	3.01	.903	—	—	—	—	—	—	—	—
2018–19	Utica Comets	AHL	10	3	5	0	502	25	1	2.99	.874	—	—	—	—	—	—	—	—
NHL totals			31	8	13	4	1653	82	2	2.98	.895	—	—	—	—	—	—	—	—

=== International ===
Year	Team	Event	Result	GP	W	L	T	MIN	GA	SO	GAA	SV%
2009	Czech Republic	WJC18	6th	3	1	2	0	116	7	0	3.62	.892
2011	Czech Republic	WJC	7th	3	1	2	0	112	10	1	5.37	.828
Junior totals				6	2	4	0	228	17	1	4.47	.860
