= Oskars Cibuļskis =

Latvian ice hockey player (born 1988)

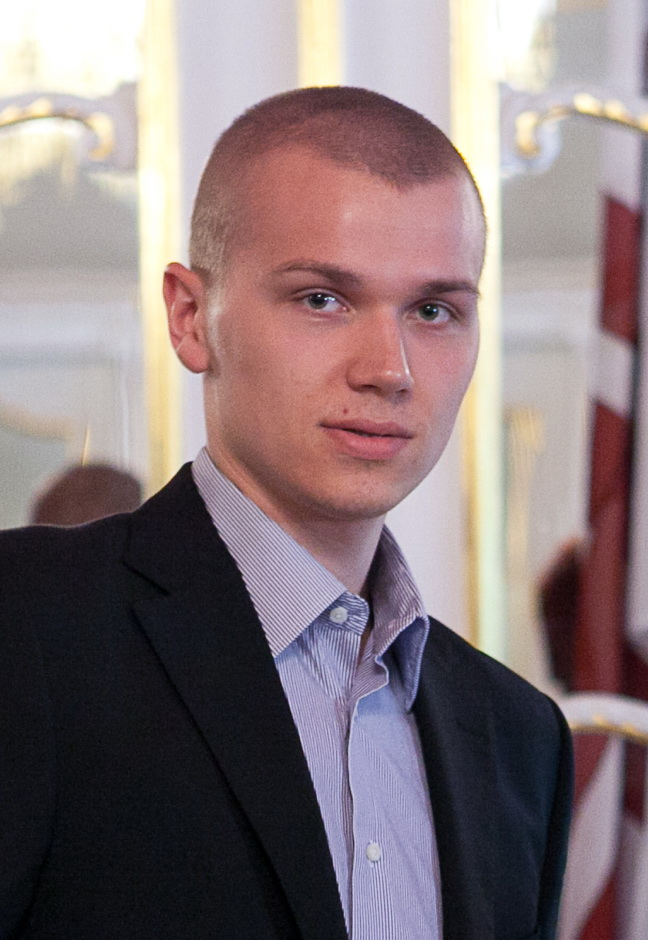
- Born: 9 April 1988 (age 38) Riga, Latvian SSR, Soviet Union
- Height: 6 ft 0 in (183 cm)
- Weight: 95 kg (209 lb; 14 st 13 lb)
- Position: Defence
- Shoots: Left
- Metal Ligaen team Former teams: Herning Blue Fox; EC Red Bull Salzburg; Dinamo Riga; Mountfield HK; HC Litvínov; Brynäs IF; Rytíři Kladno
- National team: Latvia
- Playing career: 2004–present

Oskars Cibuļskis (born 9 April 1988) is a Latvian professional ice hockey player who is a defenceman for the Herning Blue Fox of Metal Ligaen.

== Playing career ==
Cibuļskis began his professional career in 2004, when he played for the Latvian Hockey league club SK Rīga 18, which was the base club for the Latvia men's national under-18 ice hockey team. He spent the next three seasons in SK Rīga 20, which, respectively, was the base club for the Latvia men's national under-20 ice hockey team. In 2005–06, he also played two games with HK Rīga 2000 in the Belarusian Extraleague.

Following the 2007–08 season, Cibuļskis signed with Austrian league team, EC Red Bull Salzburg of the EBEL for 2008–09. After compiling 12 points in 52 games, Cibuļskis returned to his native land for the following 2009–10 season, when he signed with Dinamo Riga of the Kontinental Hockey League (KHL), on 21 August 2009.

On 18 May 2017, Cibuļskis left Riga, signing an initial one-year contract with Czech outfit Mountfield HK of the Czech Extraliga (ELH).

After four seasons in the Czech Extraliga, Cibuļskis returned as a free agent for a second stint with Dinamo Riga of the KHL on 1 May 2021.

== International play ==
Medal record

Representing Latvia

Ice hockey

World Championships
Bronze medal – third place	2023 Finland/Latvia	

Cibuļskis has played for Latvia in the 2005 and 2006 Division I World U18 Championships, getting promoted to the top U18 division in 2006. He also played in the 2007 and 2008 Division I IIHF World U20 Championships. The team earned a promotion to the top U20 division in 2008.

He represented Latvia at the 2023 IIHF World Championship, where he recorded one goal and two assists and won a bronze medal, Latvia's first ever IIHF World Championship medal.

== Career statistics ==
=== Regular season and playoffs ===
			Regular season					Playoffs
Season	Team	League	GP	G	A	Pts	PIM	GP	G	A	Pts	PIM
2004–05	Rīga/Saga/LB 18	LAT U18	—	10	12	22	18	—	—	—	—	—
2004–05	SK Rīga 20	LAT	24	5	10	15	18	3	2	0	2	4
2005–06	SK Rīga 20	LAT	—	0	3	3	44	—	—	—	—	—
2005–06	HK Rīga 2000	BLR	2	0	0	0	0	—	—	—	—	—
2006–07	SK Rīga 20	LAT	37	9	14	23	40	9	2	5	7	22
2007–08	SK LSPA/Rīga	LAT	40	7	24	31	60	3	1	0	1	6
2007–08	HK Rīga 2000	LAT	1	0	0	0	0	—	—	—	—	—
2008–09	EC Red Bull Salzburg	AUT	52	2	10	12	32	17	1	2	3	16
2009–10	HK Dinamo/Juniors	BLR	21	4	8	12	30	—	—	—	—	—
2009–10	Dinamo Rīga	KHL	12	0	0	0	10	3	0	0	0	2
2009–10	HK Dinamo/Juniors	LAT	—	—	—	—	—	7	4	4	8	4
2010–11	Dinamo Rīga	KHL	37	2	7	9	24	11	1	6	7	2
2011–12	Dinamo Rīga	KHL	42	1	2	3	10	6	0	0	0	0
2012–13	Dinamo Rīga	KHL	38	2	4	6	14	—	—	—	—	—
2013–14	Dinamo Rīga	KHL	12	1	0	1	4	—	—	—	—	—
2014–15	Dinamo Rīga	KHL	56	5	12	17	60	—	—	—	—	—
2015–16	Dinamo Rīga	KHL	39	1	2	3	20	—	—	—	—	—
2016–17	Dinamo Rīga	KHL	48	3	6	9	46	—	—	—	—	—
2017–18	Mountfield HK	ELH	49	7	10	17	24	11	1	4	5	16
2018–19	Mountfield HK	ELH	48	3	9	12	22	4	0	0	0	2
2019–20	Mountfield HK	ELH	39	1	10	11	42	2	0	0	0	0
2020–21	HC Verva Litvínov	ELH	45	4	4	8	47	3	0	1	1	0
2021–22	Dinamo Rīga	KHL	31	5	6	11	23	—	—	—	—	—
2021–22	Brynäs IF	SHL	11	0	2	2	0	2	0	1	1	0
KHL totals			315	20	39	59	211	20	1	6	7	6
ELH totals			181	15	33	48	135	20	1	5	6	18

=== International ===
Year	Team	Event	Result	GP	G	A	Pts	PIM
2005	Latvia	U18 D1	15th	5	1	1	2	6
2006	Latvia	U18 D1	11th	5	1	3	4	8
2007	Latvia	WJC D1	13th	5	1	3	4	6
2008	Latvia	WJC D1	12th	5	1	2	3	8
2011	Latvia	WC	13th	6	0	1	1	0
2012	Latvia	WC	10th	7	0	0	0	4
2015	Latvia	WC	13th	7	0	0	0	2
2016	Latvia	WC	13th	7	0	4	4	2
2017	Latvia	WC	10th	7	1	1	2	6
2018	Latvia	WC	8th	8	0	0	0	8
2019	Latvia	WC	10th	7	1	4	5	4
2021	Latvia	WC	11th	7	0	1	1	4
2021	Latvia	OGQ	Q	3	0	0	0	0
2022	Latvia	OG	11th	4	0	2	2	0
2023	Latvia	WC	3rd place, bronze medalist(s)	10	1	2	3	6
2024	Latvia	WC	9th	7	1	0	1	2
2024	Latvia	OGQ	Q	3	0	0	0	2
2025	Latvia	WC	10th	7	0	0	0	4
2026	Latvia	OG	10th	3	0	0	0	0
2026	Latvia	WC	6th	8	0	0	0	2
Junior totals				20	4	9	13	28
Senior totals				101	4	15	19	46
