= Robin Kovacs =

Swedish ice hockey player (born 1996)

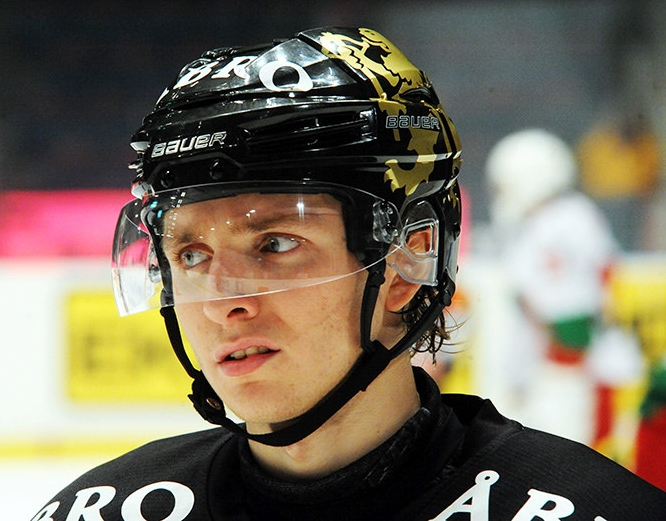
- Kovacs with AIK in 2016
- Born: 16 November 1996 (age 29) Stockholm, Sweden
- Height: 6 ft 0 in (183 cm)
- Weight: 186 lb (84 kg; 13 st 4 lb)
- Position: Right wing
- Shoots: Left
- SHL team Former teams: Linköping HC; AIK; Rögle BK; Luleå HF; Örebro HK; Lausanne HC
- NHL draft: 62nd overall, 2015; New York Rangers
- Playing career: 2013–present

Robin Kovacs (born 16 November 1996) is a Swedish professional ice hockey forward for Linköping HC of the Swedish Hockey League (SHL). He was drafted 62nd overall by the New York Rangers in the 2015 NHL entry draft.

== Playing career ==
He made his Elitserien debut playing with AIK during the 2012–13 Elitserien season. Kovacs, who is of Hungarian descent, was seen as one of the top twenty international skaters for the 2015 NHL entry draft according to the NHL Central Scouting Bureau.

Kovacs played in four games with Rögle BK in the Swedish Hockey League (SHL) during the 2015–16 season. After being loaned for the majority of the campaign back with AIK, Kovacs signed a three-year, entry-level contract with the New York Rangers on 18 July 2016.

In his first North American season in 2016–17, Kovacs struggled to adapt offensively in playing with the Rangers American Hockey League affiliate, the Hartford Wolf Pack. He appeared in 72 of 76 games with the Wolf Pack, totalling just 2 goals and 12 points. Having endured a troubling off-season in Sweden (see Personal life), and underperforming at the Rangers' 2017 training camp, Kovacs failed to play in a pre-season game as he was amongst the first roster cuts reassigned to Hartford on 19 September 2017. On 1 October 2017, Kovacs was placed on unconditional waivers in order to terminate the remainder of his contract with the Rangers and return to Sweden. On 7 October 2017, he signed a two-year deal with Luleå HF of the Swedish Hockey League (SHL). In April 2022 he signed a tree-year contract with Lausanne HC in Switzerland.

== Personal life ==
Kovacs has a neuropsychiatric disability, with ADHD and dyslexia. He has credited the conditions for helping progress his professional career.

Kovacs was found guilty and later fined for reckless driving in a fatal traffic accident involving a friend in June 2017.

He and his wife, retired Swedish national team goaltender Minatsu Murase, have three children – born in October 2018, September 2020, and November 2022.

== Career statistics ==
=== Regular season and playoffs ===
| | | | Regular season | | | | | Playoffs |
| Season | Team | League | GP | G | A | Pts | PIM | GP | G | A | Pts | PIM |
|---|---|---|---|---|---|---|---|---|---|---|---|---|
| 2010–11 | Flemingsbergs IK | J18 | 13 | 6 | 5 | 11 | 10 | — | — | — | — | — |
| 2011–12 | AIK | J18 | 17 | 7 | 7 | 14 | 20 | — | — | — | — | — |
| 2011–12 | AIK | J18 Allsv | 18 | 5 | 9 | 14 | 41 | — | — | — | — | — |
| 2012–13 | AIK | J18 | 18 | 18 | 16 | 34 | 59 | — | — | — | — | — |
| 2012–13 | AIK | J18 Allsv | 18 | 14 | 16 | 30 | 24 | 5 | 4 | 4 | 8 | 8 |
| 2012–13 | AIK | J20 | 6 | 2 | 2 | 4 | 4 | 1 | 0 | 0 | 0 | 0 |
| 2012–13 | AIK | SEL | 1 | 0 | 0 | 0 | 0 | — | — | — | — | — |
| 2013–14 | AIK | J18 | 1 | 0 | 0 | 0 | 12 | — | — | — | — | — |
| 2013–14 | AIK | J18 Allsv | 6 | 2 | 5 | 7 | 39 | — | — | — | — | — |
| 2013–14 | AIK | J20 | 40 | 15 | 13 | 28 | 62 | 2 | 1 | 1 | 2 | 6 |
| 2013–14 | AIK | SHL | 3 | 0 | 0 | 0 | 0 | — | — | — | — | — |
| 2014–15 | AIK | J20 | 9 | 5 | 5 | 10 | 8 | — | — | — | — | — |
| 2014–15 | AIK | Allsv | 52 | 17 | 11 | 28 | 63 | — | — | — | — | — |
| 2015–16 | AIK | Allsv | 44 | 21 | 13 | 34 | 54 | 7 | 1 | 3 | 4 | 29 |
| 2015–16 | Rögle BK | SHL | 4 | 0 | 1 | 1 | 0 | — | — | — | — | — |
| 2016–17 | Hartford Wolf Pack | AHL | 72 | 2 | 10 | 12 | 20 | — | — | — | — | — |
| 2017–18 | Luleå HF | SHL | 44 | 13 | 14 | 27 | 20 | 3 | 2 | 0 | 2 | 0 |
| 2018–19 | Luleå HF | SHL | 52 | 11 | 22 | 33 | 38 | 10 | 2 | 3 | 5 | 6 |
| 2019–20 | Luleå HF | SHL | 32 | 8 | 11 | 19 | 14 | — | — | — | — | — |
| 2019–20 | Örebro HK | SHL | 18 | 4 | 8 | 12 | 18 | — | — | — | — | — |
| 2020–21 | Örebro HK | SHL | 51 | 17 | 21 | 38 | 42 | 9 | 1 | 5 | 6 | 4 |
| 2021–22 | Örebro HK | SHL | 52 | 21 | 20 | 41 | 26 | 6 | 1 | 5 | 6 | 0 |
| 2022–23 | Lausanne HC | NL | 44 | 13 | 16 | 29 | 24 | — | — | — | — | — |
| 2023–24 | Lausanne HC | NL | 36 | 8 | 14 | 22 | 14 | 8 | 1 | 5 | 6 | 4 |
| 2024–25 | Linköping HC | SHL | 51 | 17 | 21 | 38 | 55 | — | — | — | — | — |
| SHL totals | | | 308 | 91 | 118 | 209 | 213 | 28 | 6 | 13 | 19 | 14 |

=== International ===
| Year | Team | Event | Result | GP | G | A | Pts | PIM |
|---|---|---|---|---|---|---|---|---|
| 2013 | Sweden | U17 | 1st place, gold medalist(s) | 6 | 1 | 0 | 1 | 4 |
| 2013 | Sweden | IH18 | 7th | 4 | 1 | 0 | 1 | 2 |
| Junior totals | | | | 10 | 2 | 0 | 2 | 6 |
