= Matteo Nodari =

Italian footballer (born 1991)

Personal information
- Date of birth: May 24, 1991 (age 35)
- Place of birth: Alzano Lombardo, Italy
- Height: 1.82 m (6 ft 0 in)
- Position: Goalkeeper

Team information
- Current team: Tritium

Senior career*
Years	Team	Apps	(Gls)
2008–2009	AlbinoLeffe	1	(0)
2009–2010	Mezzocorona	5	(0)
2010–2011	Lappo	28	(0)
2011–2012	Tritium	4	(0)
- * Club domestic league appearances and goals

Matteo Nodari (born May 24, 1991, in Alzano Lombardo) is an Italian professional footballer for Tritium Calcio 1908.
