= Igor Brikun =

Belarusian ice hockey player

- Born: September 6, 1986 (age 38); Navapolatsk, Belarusian SSR, USSR
- Height: 1.80 m (5 ft 11 in)
- Weight: 80 kg (176 lb; 12 st 8 lb)
- Position: Goaltender
- Catches: Left
- BXL team Former teams: Yunost Minsk; HK Gomel; Saryarka Karagandy; HK Neman Grodno
- National team: Belarus
- Playing career: 2005–present

Igor Sergeyevich Brikun (Russian: Игорь Сергеевич Брикун; born September 6, 1986) is a Belarusian ice hockey goaltender for Yunost Minsk. Internationally he has played for the Belarusian national team. He participated at the 2015 IIHF World Championship. His older brother, Kirill Brikun, is also a hockey player. Previously he played for HK Gomel, HK Neman Grodno, and Saryarka Karagandy, a Kazakh team that played in the Supreme Hockey League (VHL).
