= Jonas Berglund =

Swedish ice hockey player

- Born: December 4, 1990 (age 35) Älvsbyn, Sweden
- Height: 6 ft 2 in (188 cm)
- Weight: 183 lb (83 kg; 13 st 1 lb)
- Position: Forward
- Shoots: Left
- SHL team Former teams: Luleå HF; Frisk Asker; Manglerud Star
- Playing career: 2009–present

Jonas Berglund (born December 4, 1990) is a Swedish professional ice hockey player. He currently plays for Luleå HF in the Swedish Swedish Hockey League (SHL).

During the 2018–19 season, on 1 January 2018, Larsson extended his contract for an additional year with Luleå HF through to 2020.

== Awards and honours ==
Award	Year
SHL
Le Mat Trophy (Luleå HF)	2025
