= Petr Koukal (ice hockey) =

Czech ice hockey player

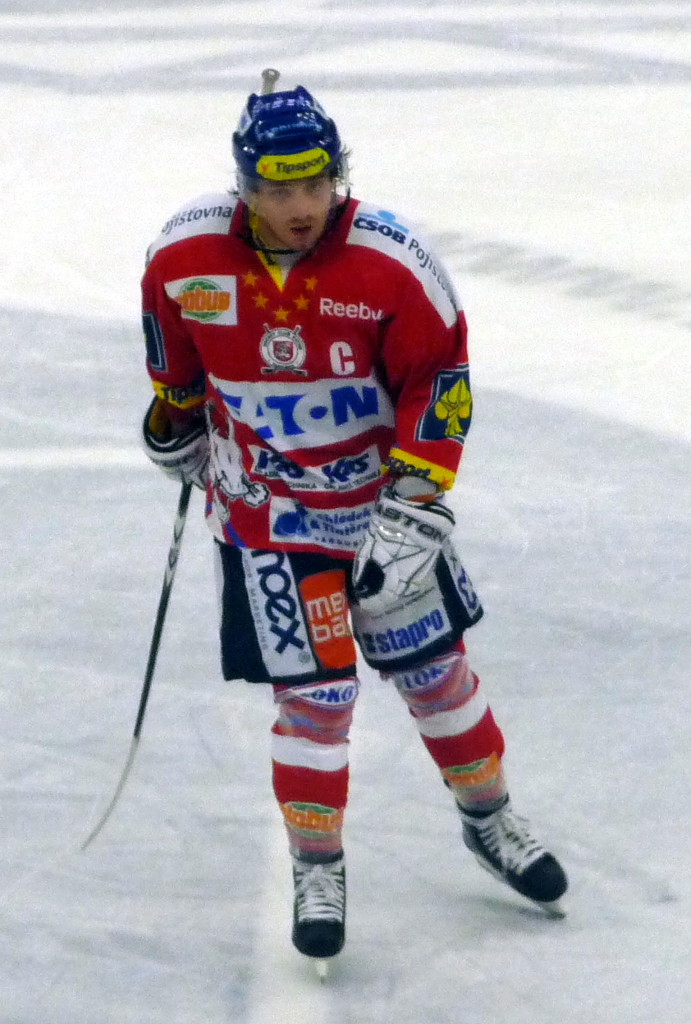
- Born: 16 August 1982 (age 44) Žďár nad Sázavou, Czechoslovakia
- Height: 5 ft 10 in (178 cm)
- Weight: 192 lb (87 kg; 13 st 10 lb)
- Position: Forward
- Shoots: Left
- ELH team Former teams: HK Hradec Kralove; HC Dynamo Pardubice; HC Plzeň; HC Neftekhimik Nizhnekamsk; Jokerit; Avtomobilist Yekaterinburg
- National team: Czech Republic
- Playing career: 2001–present
Medal record
World Championships
Bronze medal – third place	2012 Finland

Petr Koukal (Czech pronunciation: [ˈpɛtr̩ ˈkoukal]; born 16 August 1982) is a Czech professional ice hockey player who is currently playing for HK Hradec Kralove in the Czech Extraliga (ELH). He participated at the 2010 IIHF World Championship as a member of the Czech Republic National men's ice hockey team.

His older brother Martin is a cross-country skiing world champion.

== Career statistics ==
=== Regular season and playoffs ===
			Regular season					Playoffs
Season	Team	League	GP	G	A	Pts	PIM	GP	G	A	Pts	PIM
1999–2000	HC Žďár nad Sázavou	CZE.2 U20	8	4	9	13	28	—	—	—	—	—
1999–2000	HC IPB Pojišťovna Pardubice	CZE U20	40	4	5	9	4	6	1	0	1	0
2000–01	HC IPB Pojišťovna Pardubice	CZE U20	48	17	41	58	20	7	5	4	9	14
2001–02	HC IPB Pojišťovna Pardubice	CZE U20	39	26	45	71	30	5	5	8	13	0
2001–02	HC IPB Pojišťovna Pardubice	ELH	10	2	1	3	0	1	0	0	0	0
2001–02	HC Papíroví Draci Šumperk	CZE.2	10	3	7	10	14	—	—	—	—	—
2002–03	HC ČSOB Pojišťovna Pardubice	CZE U20	4	6	4	10	6	—	—	—	—	—
2002–03	HC ČSOB Pojišťovna Pardubice	ELH	50	5	6	11	14	17	4	3	7	0
2002–03	HC VČE Hradec Králové, a.s.	CZE.2	11	6	1	7	0	—	—	—	—	—
2003–04	HC Moeller Pardubice	ELH	46	2	12	14	20	5	1	0	1	2
2003–04	HC VČE Hradec Králové, a.s.	CZE.2	7	1	3	4	6	2	0	0	0	0
2004–05	HC Moeller Pardubice	ELH	49	4	6	10	30	16	2	5	7	6
2005–06	HC Moeller Pardubice	ELH	43	2	10	12	38	—	—	—	—	—
2005–06	HC Lasselsberger Plzeň	ELH	9	1	4	5	2	—	—	—	—	—
2006–07	HC Moeller Pardubice	ELH	52	7	10	17	48	17	3	0	3	14
2007–08	HC Moeller Pardubice	ELH	50	6	12	18	34	—	—	—	—	—
2008–09	HC Moeller Pardubice	ELH	51	15	23	38	48	7	1	4	5	2
2009–10	HC Eaton Pardubice	ELH	52	13	27	40	38	13	2	10	12	6
2010–11	HC Eaton Pardubice	ELH	50	13	16	29	38	9	5	3	8	18
2011–12	HC ČSOB Pojišťovna Pardubice	ELH	51	18	33	51	46	18	6	3	9	4
2012–13	Neftekhimik Nizhnekamsk	KHL	52	14	22	36	43	4	1	1	2	14
2013–14	Neftekhimik Nizhnekamsk	KHL	46	9	10	19	34	—	—	—	—	—
2014–15	Jokerit	KHL	56	12	18	30	36	10	2	4	6	8
2015–16	Avtomobilist Yekaterinburg	KHL	59	11	26	37	46	6	0	2	2	6
2016–17	Avtomobilist Yekaterinburg	KHL	56	12	12	24	77	—	—	—	—	—
2017–18	Mountfield HK	ELH	50	12	25	37	34	12	2	3	5	4
2018–19	Mountfield HK	ELH	43	10	14	24	59	2	0	0	0	0
2019–20	Mountfield HK	ELH	46	5	8	13	22	2	1	0	1	0
2020–21	Mountfield HK	ELH	52	3	13	16	26	7	2	0	2	6
2021–22	Mountfield HK	ELH	45	2	6	8	16	5	0	1	1	0
2021–22	SC Marimex Kolín	CZE.2	1	0	3	3	0	—	—	—	—	—
ELH totals			652	115	207	322	471	131	29	32	61	62
KHL totals			269	58	88	146	236	20	3	7	10	28

=== International ===
Year	Team	Event	GP	G	A	Pts	PIM
2010	Czech Republic	WC	9	0	2	2	2
2012	Czech Republic	WC	7	2	1	3	0
2013	Czech Republic	WC	5	2	0	2	4
2015	Czech Republic	WC	10	1	0	1	6
2016	Czech Republic	WC	7	0	0	0	2
2018	Czech Republic	OG	6	1	0	1	2
Senior totals			44	6	3	9	16
