= 1970–71 Porin Ässät season =

SM-sarja team season

1970–71 Porin Ässät
- SM-liiga champions
- League: 1st SM-sarja
- 1970–71 record: 22–4–6
- Goals for: 140
- Goals against: 88

Team information
- Coach: Lasse Heikkilä
- Captain: Raimo Kilpiö
- Arena: Isomäki artificial ice
- Average attendance: 4 253

Team leaders
- Goals: Veli-Pekka Ketola (25)
- Assists: Raimo Kilpiö (22)
- Points: Veli-Pekka Ketola (42)
- Penalty minutes: Kaj Matalamäki (32)

The 1970–71 Porin Ässät season was the club's fourth season in the SM-sarja, the top-tier of ice hockey in Finland. Ässät finished 3rd in the regular season, but finished first in the final series to become the Finnish champions for the very first time in the club's history.

== Season ==
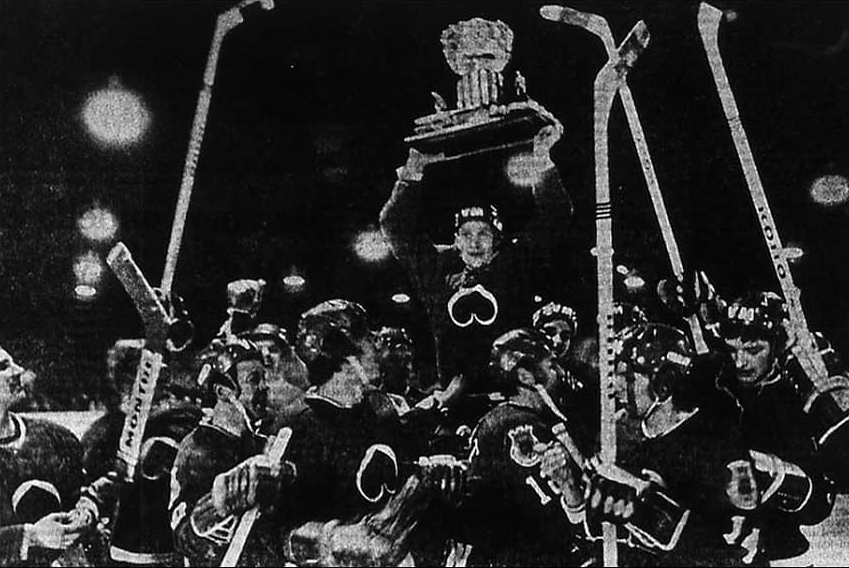
Porin Ässät players raising the Kanada-malja after winning the Finnish championship of ice hockey 1971

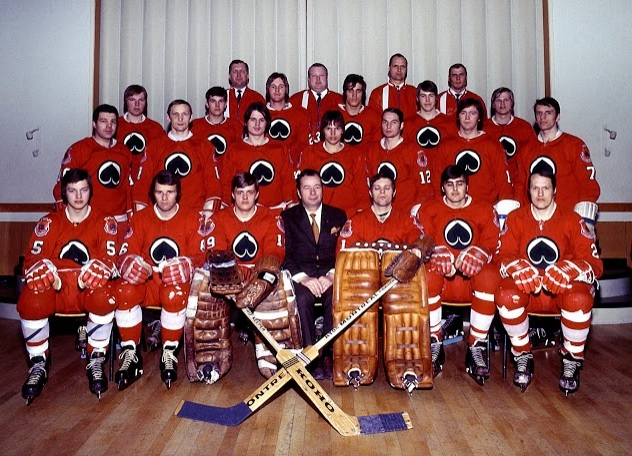
Porin Ässät team photo 1970–71

For the season 1970–71, Ässät got a high-class returnee from Helsinki when Veli-Pekka Ketola returned to Pori after playing for one season in the Jokerit. Alpo Suhonen also returned to Ässät. Ketola's return to his home club gave rise to a huge training enthusiasm in other players as well, and coach Lasse Heikkilä took the team on a training trip to Moscow before the start of the season. The trip to the Soviet Union started training very early, by the standards of the time, because there was no ice on Pori in early autumn. In the 1970–71 season Ässät finished third in the regular season after Jokerit and HIFK. In the final series, everything fell into place, Ässät lost only one of their ten matches and overtook the Helsinki clubs ahead. The gold medals were finally secured by a five-point difference to the Jokerit who came in second. The first championship came under the leadership of the forward trio Erkki Väkiparta - Veli-Pekka Ketola - Tapio Koskinen. Other lines behind first line were also able to provide to the team. There were also big names in the defense, such as Antti Heikkilä and Pekka Rautakallio. Veli-pekka Ketola was the highest point scorer in the SM-sarja during the 1970–71 season with 42 points, of which 25 were goals and 17 were assists. Ässät's captain during the season was Raimo Kilpiö. Ässät's number one goalie was Jorma Valtonen who played every game of the season. Valtonen finished the final series with a .922 save percentage.

== Standings ==
=== Regular season ===
Regular season top-5 teams

	Club	GP	W	T	L	GF–GA	Pts
1.	Jokerit Helsinki	22	17	2	3	118:65	36
2.	HIFK Helsinki	22	16	1	5	126:64	33
3.	Ässät Pori	22	14	3	5	100:64	31
4.	Tappara Tampere	22	14	2	6	121:64	30
5.	HJK Helsinki	22	11	4	7	112:82	26

=== Final series ===
Ässät finished 1st after the final series. Statistics from the regular season and the final series combined.

	Club	GP	W	T	L	GF–GA	Pts
1.	Ässät Pori	32	22	4	6	140:88	48
2.	Jokerit Helsinki	32	20	3	9	145:97	43
3.	HIFK Helsinki	32	19	2	11	145:97	40
4.	Tappara Tampere	32	17	5	10	157:94	39
5.	HJK Helsinki	32	16	4	12	147:119	36
6.	Ilves Tampere	32	15	6	11	135:114	36
