= 1989–90 Porin Ässät season =

I-Divisioona team season

1989–90 Porin Ässät
- I-Divisioona champions
- League: 1st I-Divisioona
- 1989–90 record: 37–3–4
- Goals for: 355
- Goals against: 144

Team information
- Coach: Matti Keinonen
- Captain: Tapio Levo
- Arena: Pori Ice Hall
- Average attendance: 4 412

Team leaders
- Goals: Arto Javanainen (59)
- Assists: Aleksei Frolikov (53)
- Points: Arto Heiskanen (110)
- Penalty minutes: Jari Levonen (86)
- Plus/minus: Arto Heiskanen (+90)

The 1989–90 Porin Ässät season was the club's first and only season in the I-Divisioona and the second highest league in Finland. Ässät was relegated after the previous SM-liiga season. Ässät crushed I-Divisioona records and was promoted back to the SM-liiga after just one season.

Relegation to the I-Divisioona for the 1989–1990 season, however, raised the hockey boom in Pori, as the townspeople stood behind their team. Audience numbers increased from previous SM-liiga seasons when Ässät's games were watched with interest. For the I-Divisioona season, Ässät got top reinforcements when Arto Javanainen returned from TPS and Arto Heiskanen from Lukko. Aleksei Frolikov and Vladimir Durdin came from Riga Dynamo. Matti "Mölli" Keinonen became the coach. The visit to the I-Divisioona only lasted a season. Ässät was superior in the regular season, breaking numerous I-Divisioona records and easily progressing to the series win and SM-liiga qualification. In the SM-liiga qualifiers, Ässät faced JoKP. Ässät won the series 3–0 and returned to the SM-liiga.

== Regular season and promotion ==
Ässät's regular season started with a 10–2 home victory against Kiekko-Espoo. Ässät won the next four games, before a 3–3 tie game with FoPS. Ässät's first loss came in January 1990 after a 27 game unbeaten streak. Ässät managed to only lose four games out of the 44 game season and tie three times. Some of the biggest victories for Ässät included 19–4 against Ketterä, 19–3 against Sport, 20–6 against Ketterä again and 13–0 against KooVee. Ässät's top point scorer was Arto Heiskanen with 110, a I-Divisioona record. Arto Heiskanen also recorded a +/- statistic of +90.

Ässät finished 1st in the regular season, winning the I-Divisioona championship. Ässät faced JoKP in the SM-liiga qualification series. Ässät won the series 3–0 and got promoted back to the SM-liiga.

== Player statistics ==
=== Skaters ===
Top-10 point scorers of the season. Sorted by points, then +/-.

#	Player	Position	GP	G	A	Pts	+/-	PIM
1.	Arto Heiskanen	Forward	44	58	52	110	+90	12
2.	Arto Javanainen	Forward	36	59	39	98	+79	30
3.	Kari Makkonen	Forward	44	31	52	83	+80	18
4.	Aleksei Frolikov	Forward	43	28	53	81	+86	12
5.	Tapio Levo	Defence	44	32	47	79	+87	33
6.	Jari Levonen	Forward	43	37	26	63	+54	86
7.	Rauli Raitanen	Forward	41	17	44	61	+56	20
8.	Vladimir Durdin	Defence	43	14	35	49	+83	18
9.	Janne Virtanen	Forward	42	9	40	49	+26	6
10.	Jokke Heinänen	Forward	40	27	13	40	+15	8
