= 1969–70 Porin Ässät season =

SM-sarja team season

1969–70 Porin Ässät
- League: 6th SM-sarja
- 1969–70 record: 9–5–8
- Goals for: 86
- Goals against: 59

Team information
- Coach: Lasse Heikkilä
- Captain: Raimo Kilpiö
- Arena: Isomäki artificial ice
- Average attendance: 3 669

The 1969–70 Porin Ässät season was the club's third season in the SM-sarja, the top-tier ice hockey league in Finland. Ässät finished 6th in the league.

== Season ==
Ässät suffered two heavy losses when Veli-Pekka Ketola and Alpo Suhonen left for Jokerit.

Ässät's season started on the 1st of November in a game against IFK Helsingfors, which ended in Ässät's 1–2 loss. Ässät's biggest victory came against Reipas, when Ässät beat them 12–2 at home ice. Ässät won nine games and tied five times in the 22 game season, which gave them the 6th spot with 23 points. Ässät's top point scorer was Jaakko Honkanen with 20 points. The top goal scorer was defenceman Ilkka Mesikämmen with 13. Ässät's captain was Raimo Kilpiö and the team was coached by Lasse Heikkilä.
