= Raimo =

Male given name and surname

Raimo is a masculine given name.

People named Raimo include:

- Raimo Aas (born 1953), Estonian humorist
- Raimo Grönberg (born 1953), Finnish actor
- Raimo Hämäläinen (born 1948), Finnish professor of applied mathematics and operations research
- Raimo Heino (1932–1995), Finnish designer of coins, relief figures and medallions
- Raimo Heinonen (born 1935), Finnish gymnast
- Raimo Helminen (born 1964), Finnish ice hockey player
- Raimo Hirvonen (born 1950), Finnish wrestler
- Raimo Honkanen (1938–2020), Finnish cyclist
- Raimo Ilaskivi (born 1928), Finnish politician
- Raimo Kangro (1949–2001), Estonian composer
- Raimo Karlsson (1948–2007), Finnish wrestler
- Raimo Kilpiö (born 1936), Finnish ice hockey player
- Raimo Lahti (born 1946), Finnish professor of criminal law
- Raimo Mähönen (born 1938), Finnish politician
- Raimo Manninen (alpine skier) (1940–2009), Finnish alpine skier
- Raimo Manninen (athlete) (born 1955), Finnish javelin thrower
- Raimo Pajusalu (born 1981), Estonian volleyball player
- Raimo Pärssinen (born 1956), Swedish politician
- Raimo Pullat (born 1935), Estonian historian
- Raimo Raag (born 1953), Swedish-Estonian linguist and cultural historian
- Raimo Sirkiä (born 1951), Finnish operatic tenor
- Raimo Suikkanen (1942–2021), Finnish cyclist
- Raimo Summanen (born 1962), Finnish ice hockey player and coach
- Raimo Epifanio Tesauro (1480–1511), Italian painter of the Renaissance period
- Raimo Tuomainen (born 1957), Finnish health sociologist
- Raimo Tuomela (1940–2020), Finnish philosopher
- Raimo Valle (born 1965), Norwegian civil servant and politician
- Raimo Vistbacka (born 1945), Finnish politician and former member of the Finnish Parliament
- Raimo de Vries (born 1969), Dutch footballer
- Raimo Ylipulli (born 1970), Finnish ski jumper

== See also ==
- Raimo (surname)
- Raimon
- Ramo
