= Rauli =

Rauli may refer to:

- Rauli, a village and railway station in Odisha, India.
- Nothofagus alpina (rauli), a species of plant in the family Fagaceae
- Rauli, a male given name, a Finnish version of the name Ralph. It may refer to:
  - Rauli Pudas, Finnish pole vaulter
  - Rauli Raitanen, Finnish ice hockey player
  - Rauli Somerjoki, Finnish rock singer
  - Rauli Tuomi (1919–1949), Finnish actor
  - Rauli Virtanen, Finnish freelance journalist and television producer
