= List of Finnish lawyers =

A list of notable Finnish lawyers:

== A ==
- Pauli Alankoja
- Ivar Aminoff
- Pentti Arajärvi

== B ==
- Christer Boucht

== H ==
- Tarja Halonen

== I ==
- Rieti Itkonen

== J ==
- Niilo Jääskinen

== K ==
- Martti Koskenniemi

== L ==
- Raimo Lahti

== M ==
- Jukka Mikkola

== N ==
- Sauli Niinistö

== P ==
- Hannele Pokka
- Yrjö Pulkkinen

== R ==
- Johan Wilhelm Rangell
- Juha Rantasila

== S ==
- Asser Salo
- Martin Scheinin
- Helvi Sipilä
- Eliel Soisalon-Soininen
- Kaarlo Ståhlberg

== T ==
- Kari S. Tikka

== W ==
- Matti Wuori
