= ELiiga =

Finnish esports league

eLiiga
- Game: CHEL
- First season: 2020
- Folded: 2022
- No. of teams: 15
- Country: Finland
- Last champion: HC TPS (2021–2022)
- Most titles: Tappara and HC TPS (1)
- Streaming partners: MTV3, Assembly, C More, Sub
- Sponsor: PlayStation (2021–2022)

eLiiga was a Finnish esports league that was played in the NHL video game series. The teams competing in the tournament were real ice hockey teams that play in the Liiga, the top-tier league of Finland. The league was hosted by Liiga and Telia. Only the top-eight teams could make it into the playoffs. The playoffs were played in a best-of-three series, but the final was played in a best-of-five series.

== Seasons ==
=== 2020 eLiiga ===
The first eLiiga season was played from November 4th to December 13th in 2020. Tappara won the regular season and the playoffs. Tappara beat Jukurit 3-2 in the final series on 13 November.

=== 2021–2022 eLiiga ===
The second eLiiga season was played from December 3rd 2021 to 25th February 2022. The championship was won by HC TPS. TPS beat Vaasan Sport 3-1 in the final series. HIFK Hockey won bronze. The 2021–2022 season was sponsored by PlayStation.

== Participating teams ==
Every Liiga team participated in the eLiiga. List of teams:

- hREDS (HIFK)
- HPK
- Ilves
- Jukurit
- JYP
- KalPa
- KooKoo
- Kärpät
- Lukko
- Pelicans
- SaiPa
- Sport
- Tappara
- TPS
- PATA (Porin Ässät)

== eLiiga winners ==
Season	Champion	Runner-up	3rd place
2020	Kärpät	Hifk	HPK
2021–22	TPS	Sport	HIFK

== eLiiga Late Night ==
eLiiga Late Night was a late night show that went over the eLiiga games and other ice hockey games. During the 2021–2022 season, the eLiiga Late Night was hosted by Joonas "Lärvinen" Järvinen and Ville Uusitalo, former captain of Porin Ässät.
