= Aleksei Frolikov =

Latvian ice hockey player (1957–2020)

Aleksejs Froļikovs
- Born: February 15, 1957 Moscow, Russian SFSR
- Died: 31 March 2020 (aged 63)
- Height: 180 cm (5 ft 11 in)
- Weight: 87 kg (192 lb; 13 st 10 lb)
- Position: Right wing
- Shot: Left
- Played for: HC Dynamo Moscow; Dinamo Riga; Porin Ässät; Centers
- National team: Latvia and Soviet Union
- Playing career: 1978–1995

Aleksei Viktorovich Frolikov (Russian: Алексей Викторович Фроликов, Latvian: Aleksejs Froļikovs; 15 February 1957 in Moscow, Russian SFSR – 31 March 2020) was a Soviet-born Latvian ice hockey player.

He played for HC Dynamo Moscow from 1975 to 1981, and then from 1981 to 1989 he played for Dinamo Riga. He then played for Porin Ässät up until the collapse of the Soviet Union, when he joined the Centers until he ended his career in 1995 at Pārdaugava Rīga (the renamed name for Dinamo Riga).

As part of the USSR national team, he was the top goalscorer for the team in the 1977 World Junior Ice Hockey Championships.
