= Pauli Alankoja =

Finnish lawyer

Pauli Kalervo Alankoja (born 1 August 1937 in Turku; till 1967 Laiho) is a Finnish lawyer. He was chairman of the Finnish Bar Association from 1992 to 1995. He is a graduate of the University of Turku Faculty of Law in 1965 and recipient of the Shanghai University Medal. He has authored several books including his self-published novel, Ratsumies ja torpantyttö, published in 2006.

== See also ==
- List of Finnish lawyers
