= Jaroslav Otevřel =

Czech ice hockey player

- Born: 16 September 1968 (age 58) Gottwaldov, Czechoslovakia
- Height: 6 ft 2 in (188 cm)
- Weight: 185 lb (84 kg; 13 st 3 lb)
- Position: Left wing
- Shot: Left
- Played for: HK Dukla Trenčín; Zlín; San Jose Sharks; Ässät
- National team: Czechoslovakia
- NHL draft: 133rd overall, 1991; San Jose Sharks
- Playing career: 1988–1996

Jaroslav Otevřel (born 16 September 1968) is a Czech former professional ice hockey left winger. Otevřel played 16 NHL games with the San Jose Sharks. In Europe, Otevřel played with his native club AC ZPS Zlín as well as the Slovak HK Dukla Trenčín. Otevřel retired from ice hockey in 1996 after getting paralyzed in a game while representing the Finnish hockey club Porin Ässät.

== Career ==
Otevřel started his ice hockey career at the youth section of HC Zlín.

Otevřel was drafted in the seventh round, 133rd overall, by the San Jose Sharks in the 1991 NHL entry draft. He played 16 games in the National Hockey League (NHL) with the Sharks over two seasons, scoring three goals and four assists.

After career in North America, Jaroslav "Jaro" Otevřel joined Ässät of SM-liiga. His career ended on 11 February 1996, when he was paralyzed in a game against JYP Jyväskylä. He hit the skates of another JYP player slightly, fell and was then accidentally hit in the head by Vitali Karamnov's knee. His cervical spine was damaged, which resulted in him being paralyzed from the neck down.

Otevřel's number 89 is retired by the Porin Ässät, but according to his wishes, the number isn't hanging from the rafters of the Isomäki Areena. Otevřel visited an Ässät game again in 1998. He visited the arena again in 2018, 22 years after the last visit, in an Ässät–HC TPS game.

== Personal life ==
Otevřel lives in his hometown Zlín, Czech Republic, with his wife and daughter.

== Career statistics ==
=== Regular season and playoffs ===
			Regular season					Playoffs
Season	Team	League	GP	G	A	Pts	PIM	GP	G	A	Pts	PIM
1986–87	Berani Zlín U20	CSSR U20	—	27	35	62	—	—	—	—	—	—
1987–88	TJ Gottwaldov	CSSR	32	4	7	11	18	—	—	—	—	—
1988–89	TJ Gottwaldov	CSSR	40	14	6	20	37	—	—	—	—	—
1989–90	HK Dukla Trenčín	CSSR	43	7	10	17	—	—	—	—	—	—
1990–91	AC ZPS Zlín	CSSR	49	24	24	48	105	—	—	—	—	—
1991–92	AC ZPS Zlín	CSSR	36	13	10	23	—	4	0	3	3	0
1992–93	San Jose Sharks	NHL	7	0	2	2	0	—	—	—	—	—
1992–93	Kansas City Blades	IHL	62	17	27	44	58	6	1	4	5	4
1993–94	San Jose Sharks	NHL	9	3	2	5	2	—	—	—	—	—
1993–94	Kansas City Blades	IHL	62	20	33	53	46	—	—	—	—	—
1994–95	Ässät	FIN	50	13	18	31	26	7	1	4	5	2
1995–96	Ässät	FIN	43	10	26	36	44	—	—	—	—	—
NHL totals			16	3	4	7	2	—	—	—	—	—
