= Raimo (surname) =

Raimo is an Italian surname. Notable people with the surname include:

- Alessandro Raimo (born 1999), Italian footballer
- Art Raimo (1916–2001), American football player, coach, and college athletics administrator
- Federico Raimo (born 1986), Italian snowboarder
- Veronica Raimo (born 1978), Italian writer, translator, and screenwriter
- Zigmārs Raimo (born 1997), Latvian basketball player

== See also ==
- Raimo
