= Isomäki Ice Hall =

Ice hockey arena in Pori, Finland

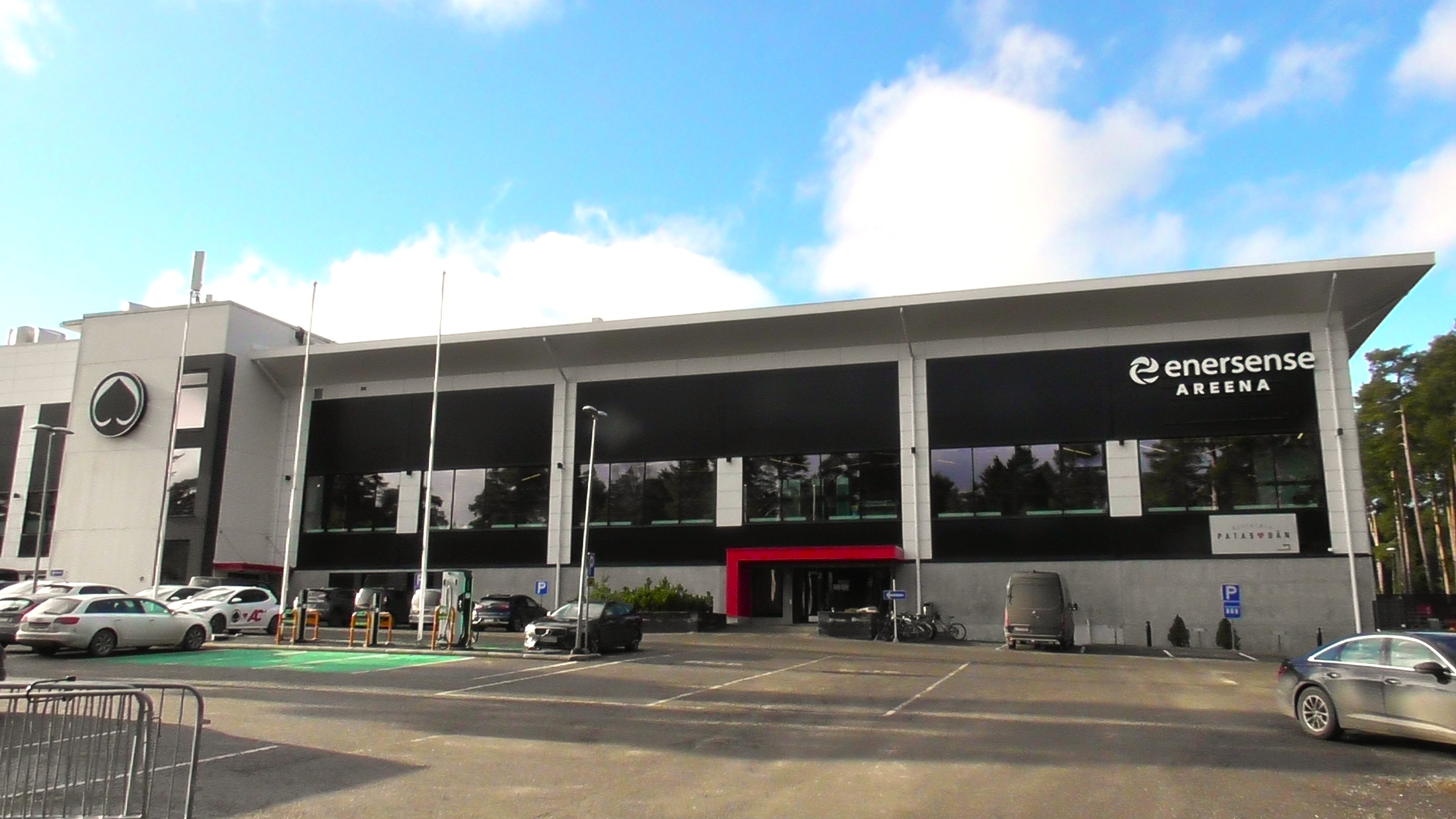
- Interactive map of Isomäki Ice Hall
- Former names: Porin jäähalli (1971–2015); Isomäki Areena (2015–2022); West Areena (2022–2023)
- Address: Metsämiehenkatu 21, 28500 Pori; Pori; Finland
- Coordinates: 61.4735162°N 21.7632684°E
- Owner: The city of Pori
- Capacity: Ice hockey: 6,150–6,400; Concerts: 4,000
- Scoreboard: Centre-hung media cube
- Record attendance: 13,000 (1978, Ässät-Tappara final game)

Construction
- Opened: 1971
- Renovated: 1986–87; 1993; 1996; 1998; 2014–16; 2023

Tenants
- Porin Ässät (SM-l) (1971–present); Porin Kiekko Weljet (2024–present); Karhu HT (S-s) (2000–2022); Porin Kärpät (KSM-s) (1990–2011)

Isomäen jäähalli, also known as Enersense Areena for sponsorship reasons, is a multi-purpose arena located in Pori, Finland. The arena is used by ice hockey clubs Porin Ässät and Porin Kiekko Weljet. The arena was opened in 1971 and the capacity for hockey games is 6 150 and for concerts 4 000.

== History ==
=== Artificial ice rink ===
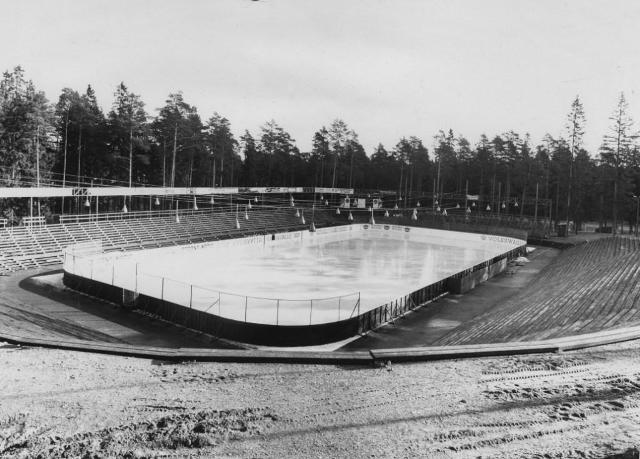
Isomäki artificial ice rink in 1964

The Isomäen tekojäärata (Isomäki artificial ice rink) was originally built as an artificial ice rink in 1964 and replaced the natural ice of Juhannuslehto in the Herralahti district. The following year, the B-series matches of the World Hockey Championships in Finland were played on this rink.

=== New arena ===
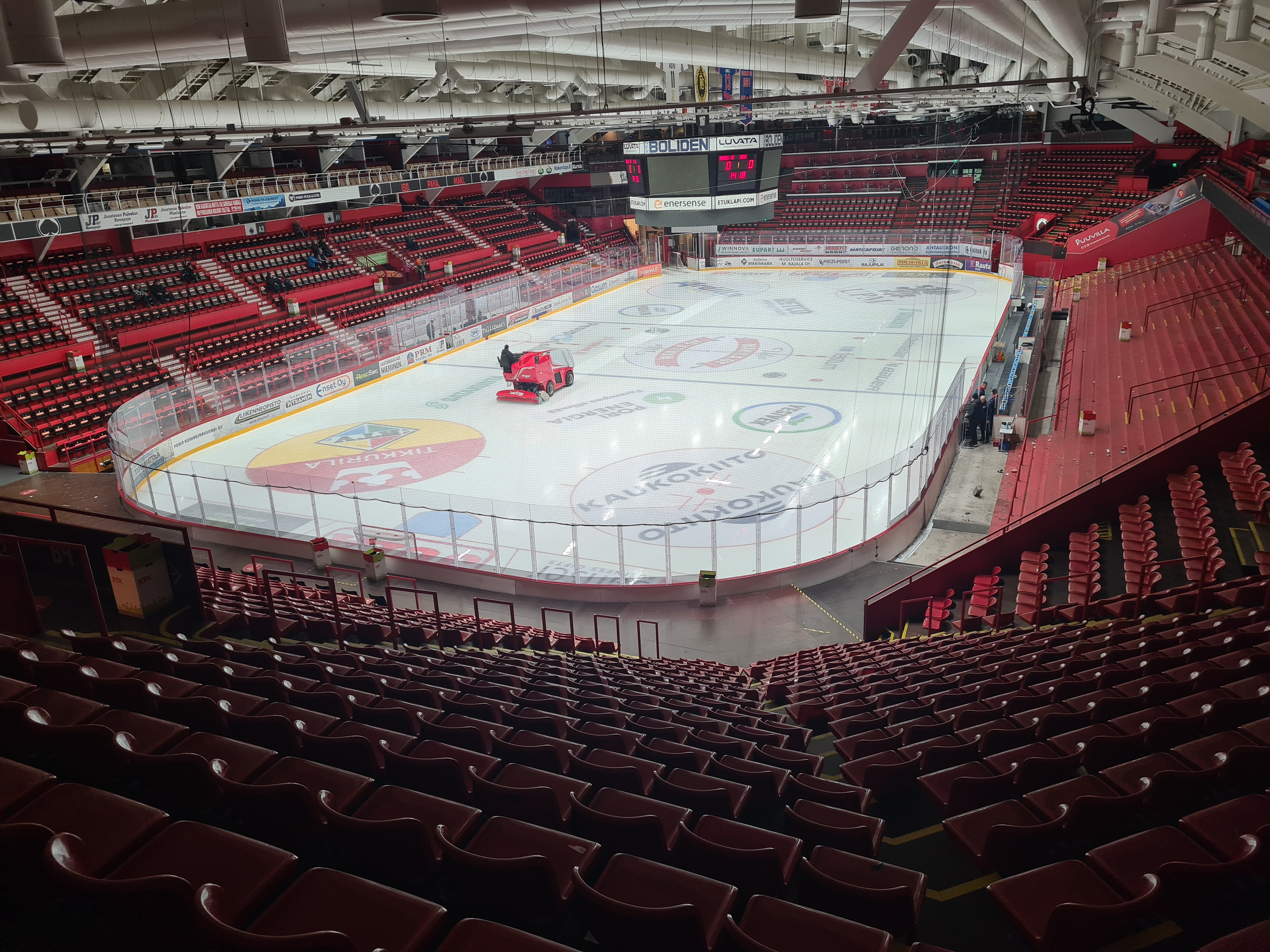
Isomäki Areena from the inside

The artificial ice was transformed into an arena in 1971 after the first Ässät won the championship for the first time. The arena had a capacity of about 8,000 spectators. There were no seats at all in the arena, and the ice was surrounded on three sides by a partly wooden standing auditorium. The arena was improved during the 1970s and, for example, the first seats were built for about 500 people at the end of the decade. At the same time, the arena got its first decent changing rooms. In the past, the teams had had to change their equipment in the Pori Stadium a couple of hundred meters away, and walk from there to the arena. The standing auditorium was also expanded on top of the changing rooms. In the spring of 1978, an all-time record was seen in Isomäki, when the decisive final match of the Finnish Championship League between Ässät and Tappara was crowded to be watched by an estimated 13,000 people. The official audience for the match was reported to be 9,364.

=== Renovations ===
The arena underwent its first major renovation in 1986–1987. thermal insulation and heating were installed into the arena, and the seating area was expanded. With the new east-facing seating area, the audience capacity of the Porin jäähalli was reduced to 7,500 spectators. A second renovation was made in 1993 when the seating area was expanded. The standing auditorium at the west end was replaced with seats in 1996. The arena underwent a third major renovation in 1998. Additional seats were built and the wooden standing auditorium was replaced with a new concrete structure. At the same time, a second floor was built in the arena, which included new restaurant, sales and sanitary facilities, as well as modern benches. Ticket sales were also transferred from the ticket offices outside to the interior. Capacity decreased in the 1990s by about a thousand spectators when standing auditoriums were replaced by seats, and for the first time in 1998-1999 there were more seats than standing auditoriums. The renovated hall had only 2,500 standing auditoriums. There were seats for 4,400 people. In 2010, a modern scoreboard showing a video was installed in the arena.

=== 2016 renovations and modern day ===
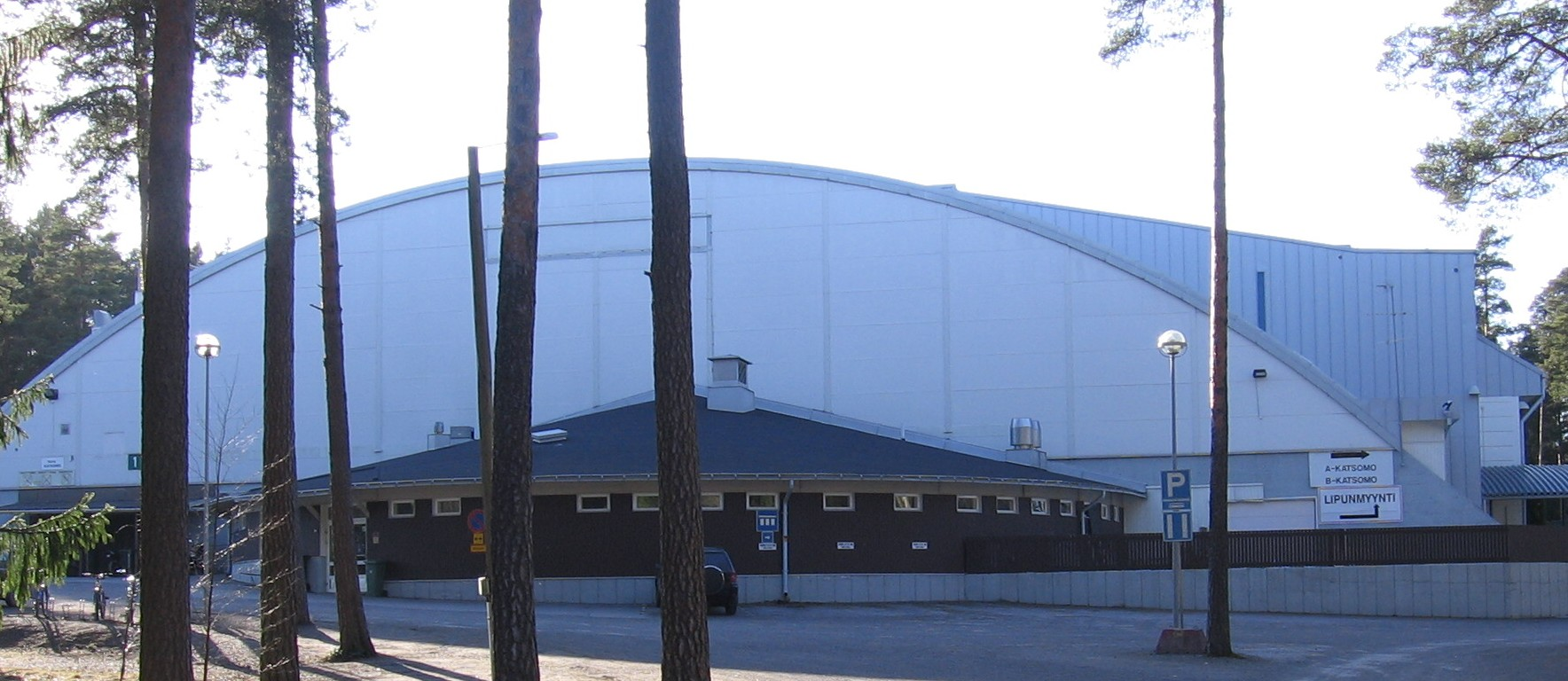
Isomäki Areena before the 2014–2016 renovations

The most recent major renovation took place in 2014–2016, when the locker room facilities in the arena were upgraded and a new three-storey extension was built at the end of the arena. Restaurant facilities were also improved and expanded. In connection with the renovation, the technologies of the entire arena were also renewed. At the same time, the capacity of the standing auditorium was reduced to about 2,200 spectators. In connection with the reform, Länsi-Suomen Osuuspankki became the main partner of Ässät. It renamed the Porin jäähalli "Isomäki Areena". The arena can accommodate 6,350 people after the latest renovation.

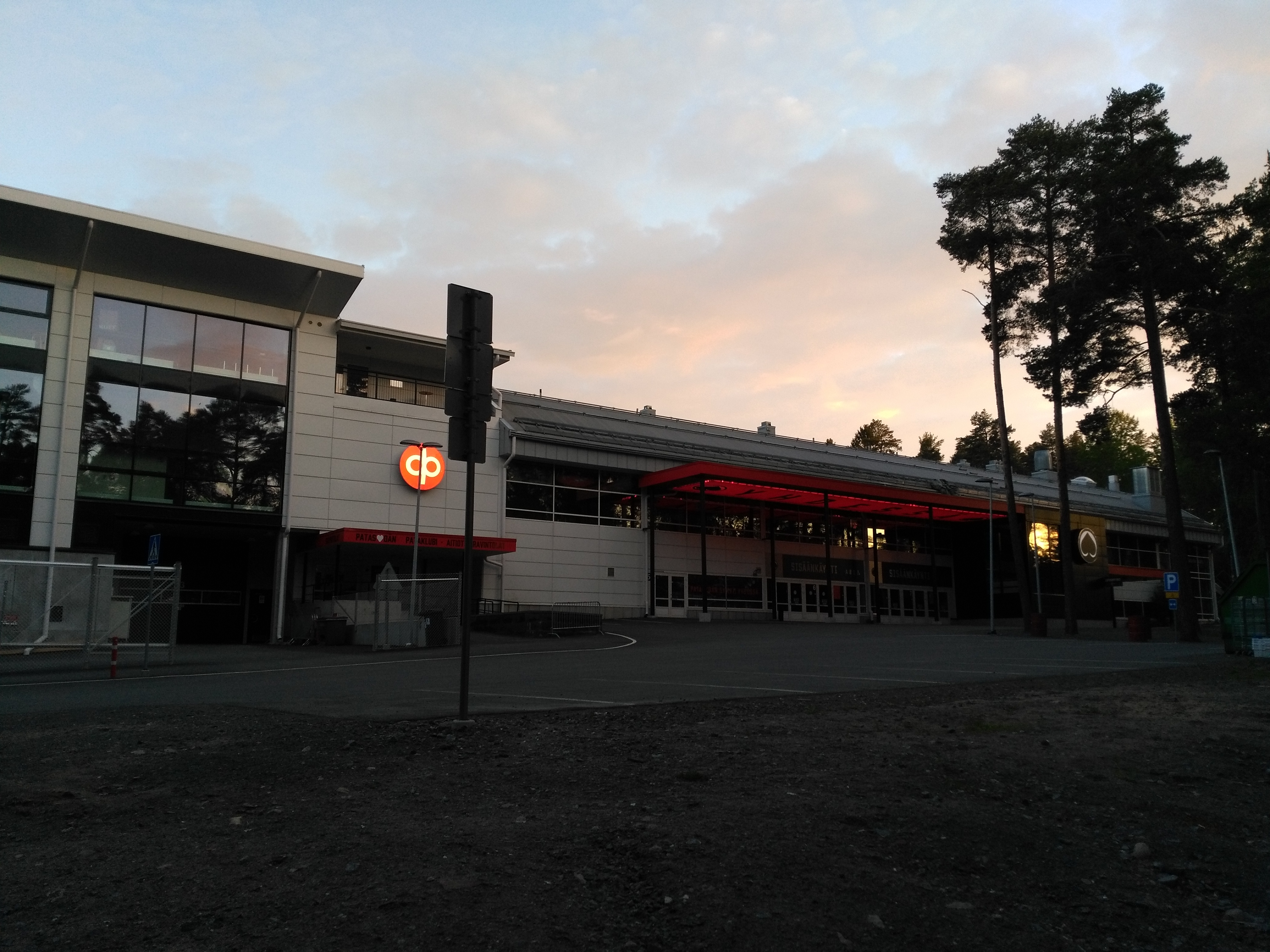
Isomäki Areena seen from the side of the entrance

In 2022, when the club ran into financial difficulties, the City of Pori bought the shares of Kiinteistö Oy Porin Jäähalli owned by HC Ässät Pori Oy, after which the city owns the arena alone. The name sponsor of the arena expired in 2022 and the naming rights were given to the advertising agency West Creative Oy. The arena will be known as "West Areena" during the 2022-23 season.

On christmas day in 2022 Porin Ässät players accidentally broke a pipe while drilling the ice which caused the ice to melt.

In 2023 after a successful season, the arena got a new jumbotron and new sound technology – increasing the amount of speakers from ten to 130. Isomäki also got more LED screens. The jumbotron was reported to have the best image quality in all of Finland. A standing section was added for away fans. Since 2023 the sponsor name of the arena has been Enersense Areena, after the naming rights were bought by Enersense International Oyj.

== Notable events ==
=== International ===
- 1976 World Junior Ice Hockey Championships
- 1965 Ice Hockey World Championships (Group B)
- Finland vs Denmark, April 21 2023

=== National ===
The 1978 SM-liiga finals were played in the Isomäki Areena and the Hakametsän jäähalli in Tampere.

The 1979 SM-liiga finals were played in the Isomäki Areena and the Hakametsän jäähalli in Tampere.

The 1980 SM-liiga finals were played in the Isomäki Areena and the Helsinki Ice Hall in Helsinki.

The 1984 SM-liiga finals were played in the Isomäki Areena and the Hakametsän jäähalli in Tampere.

The 2006 SM-liiga finals were played in the Isomäki Areena and the Ritari-areena in Hämeenlinna.

The 2009 SM-liiga relegation series was played in the Isomäki Areena and the Vaasa Arena in Vaasa.

The 2013 SM-liiga finals were played in the Isomäki Areena and the Hakametsän jäähalli in Tampere.

== Retired jerseys ==
=== Ässät ===
2: Antti Heikkilä

4: Arto Javanainen

5: Pekka Rautakallio

11: Raimo Kilpiö

12: Tapio Levo

13: Veli-Pekka ketola

22: Kari Makkonen

89: Jaroslav Otevrel (Note: Number is retired but isn't hanging from the rafters of the arena.)

=== Karhut ===
13: Lasse Heikkilä

=== RU-38 ===
11: Raimo Kilpiö (Note: Retired by RU-38 successor, Ässät, in 2019. 52 years after the team was merged with Karhut)

== See also ==
- List of indoor arenas in Finland
- List of indoor arenas in Nordic countries
