= Arto Javanainen =

Finnish ice hockey player (1959–2011)

- Born: 8 April 1959 Pori, Finland
- Died: 25 January 2011 (aged 51) Turku, Finland
- Height: 6 ft 0 in (183 cm)
- Weight: 189 lb (86 kg; 13 st 7 lb)
- Position: Right wing
- Shot: Right
- Played for: SM-liiga; Ässät; TPS; NHL; Pittsburgh Penguins
- National team: Finland
- NHL draft: 118th overall, 1983; Montreal Canadiens; 85th overall, 1984; Pittsburgh Penguins
- Playing career: 1975–1994

Arto Kalevi "Java" Javanainen (April 8, 1959 – January 25, 2011) was a Finnish professional ice hockey right wing. During his career, Javanainen represented Porin Ässät, his hometown team, as well as HC TPS in the SM-liiga. He was the first European draft pick in Pittsburgh Penguins history, but he only played 14 games with the team.

Javanainen has won two Finnish Championship and his jersey number, four, has been retired by the Porin Ässät. The Finnish Hockey Hall of Fame honored Javanainen as the Finnish Ice Hockey Lion number 121. Javanainen holds the goal record for the SM-liiga with 462 and the one season goals record with 47.

== Career ==
Javanainen started his career in 1975 in the ranks of the Porin Ässät. In his first season in the SM-liiga, he played 27 games without any points. He played 29 U20 matches with Ässät scoring 13 points. The following season, Javanainen would play 34 games with nine goals and five assists. Javanainen also represented Finland in the World Junior Championships playing seven games and scoring six points. In the 1977–78 season, Javanainen played 35 regular season games scoring eight goals and eight assist as well as nine playoff games with nine points, also winning the Finnish Championship with Ässät.

In 1983, Javanainen was drafted 118 overall by the Montreal Canadiens of the National Hockey League (NHL). The following draft in 1984, he became the first European player to be drafted by the Pittsburgh Penguins organization.

In the 1984–85 season, Javanainen played 14 games for the Penguins scoring five points. He spent most of his time in the AHL with the Baltimore Skipjacks where he played 59 games with 55 points.

During the 1987–88 season with HC TPS, Javanainen would break the one season scoring record with 47 goals.

In the 1992–93 season, Javanainen broke the all-time point record for the SM-liiga, but the record has then been broken by Janne Ojanen. Javanainen retired in 1994 after a season in Denmark.

Overall Javanainen played 668 SM-liiga games with 462 goals and 330 assists totalling 792 points. Javanainen was the top goal scorer of the league five times and was chosen to the all-star lineup four times.

== Personal life ==
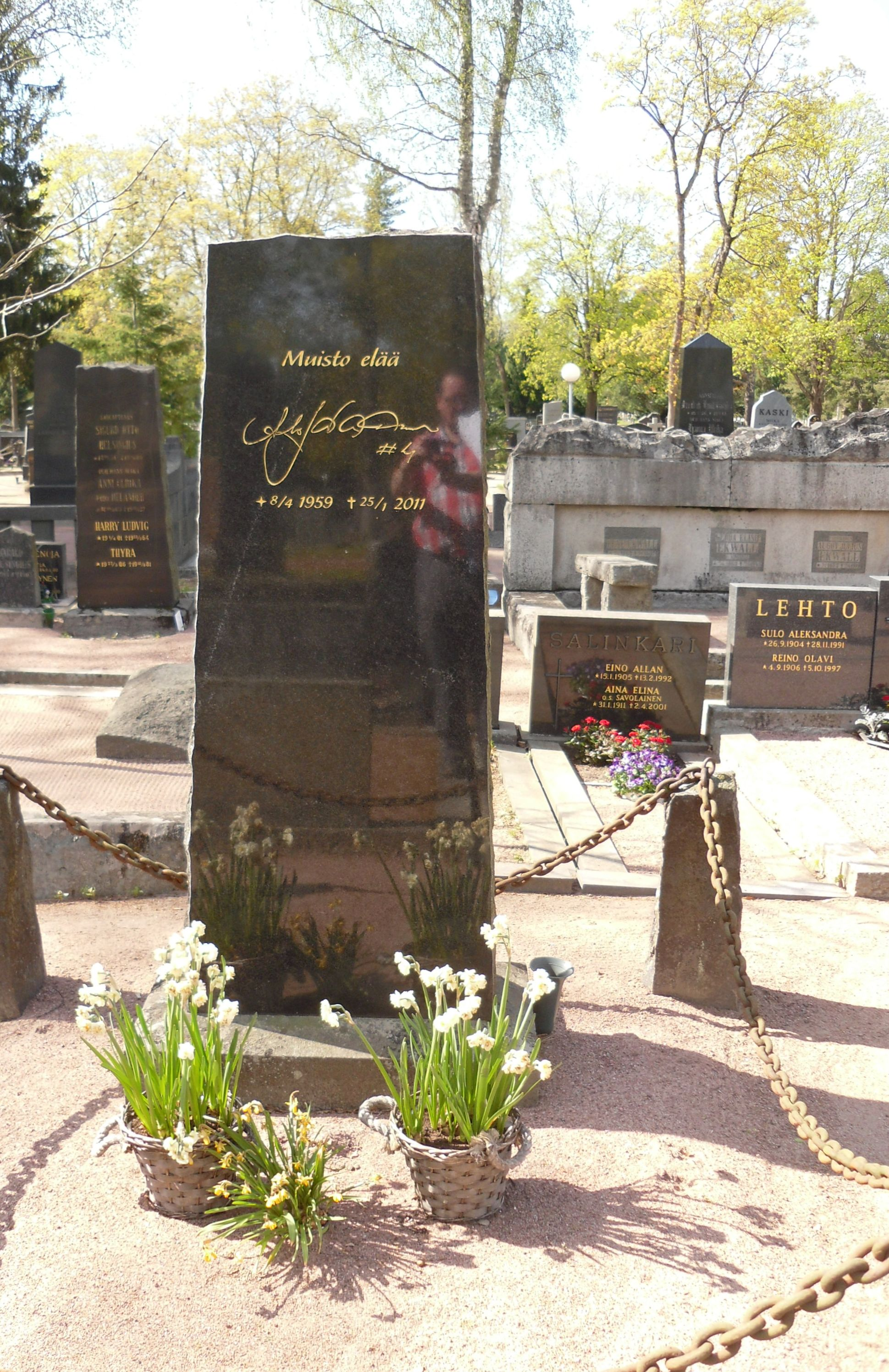
Arto Javanainen's tombstone at Käppärä graveyard in Pori

On January 26, 2011, Javanainen died in a Turku, Finland hospital after battling a long illness. He was 51 years old. He is survived by a wife and two children. Javanainen's son, Tomas, played ice hockey for FPS, HC Indians and Chiefs, but retired in 2020. He also used to play for Ässät's junior teams.

== Career statistics ==
=== Regular season and playoffs ===
			Regular season					Playoffs
Season	Team	League	GP	G	A	Pts	PIM	GP	G	A	Pts	PIM
1975–76	Ässät	FIN U20	29	10	3	13	41	—	—	—	—	—
1975–76	Ässät	SM-l	27	0	0	0	0	3	0	0	0	0
1976–77	Ässät	FIN U20	4	3	1	4	16	—	—	—	—	—
1976–77	Ässät	SM-l	34	9	5	14	8	—	—	—	—	—
1977–78	Ässät	FIN U20	13	13	7	20	12	—	—	—	—	—
1977–78	Ässät	SM-l	35	8	8	16	0	9	5	4	9	5
1978–79	Ässät	FIN U20	1	1	0	1	7	—	—	—	—	—
1978–79	Ässät	SM-l	36	31	18	49	36	8	7	4	11	7
1979–80	Ässät	FIN U20	1	1	1	2	6	—	—	—	—	—
1979–80	Ässät	SM-l	36	28	29	57	48	7	7	2	9	10
1980–81	Ässät	SM-l	36	37	27	64	40	2	1	0	1	2
1981–82	Ässät	SM-l	36	29	27	56	50	9	5	4	9	8
1982–83	Ässät	SM-l	36	28	23	51	56	—	—	—	—	—
1983–84	Ässät	SM-l	37	37	25	62	66	9	4	2	6	10
1984–85	Pittsburgh Penguins	NHL	14	4	1	5	2	—	—	—	—	—
1984–85	Baltimore Skipjacks	AHL	59	26	29	55	15	15	5	4	9	2
1985–86	Ässät	SM-l	36	44	27	71	26	—	—	—	—	—
1986–87	Ässät	SM-l	44	37	24	61	80	—	—	—	—	—
1987–88	TPS	SM-l	44	47	20	67	42	—	—	—	—	—
1988–89	TPS	SM-l	44	32	23	55	38	6	5	3	8	2
1989–90	Ässät	FIN.2	36	59	39	98	30	3	2	1	3	6
1990–91	Ässät	SM-l	44	35	18	53	38	—	—	—	—	—
1991–92	Ässät	SM-l	44	20	14	34	22	8	1	2	3	8
1992–93	Ässät	SM-l	45	17	17	34	26	8	2	3	5	8
1993–94	Ässät	SM-l	48	22	19	41	46	5	1	0	1	4
1994–95	Rungsted IK	DNK	23	33	18	51	6	6	3	1	4	0
SM-l totals			668	464	329	793	626	74	38	24	62	64

=== International ===
Year	Team	Event	GP	G	A	Pts	PIM
1977	Finland	WJC	7	4	2	6	4
1978	Finland	WJC	6	1	7	8	6
1979	Finland	WJC	6	2	3	5	0
1981	Finland	CC	5	1	0	1	2
1982	Finland	WC	5	2	1	3	4
1983	Finland	WC	10	1	2	3	8
1984	Finland	OLY	5	2	3	5	4
Junior totals			19	7	12	19	10
Senior totals			25	6	6	12	18

Preceded by Matti Hagman	Winner of the Aarne Honkavaara trophy 1980–81	Succeeded by Reijo Leppänen
Preceded by Raimo Summanen	Winner of the Aarne Honkavaara trophy 1983–84	Succeeded by Mikko Mäkelä
Preceded by Mikko Mäkelä	Winner of the Aarne Honkavaara trophy 1985–86	Succeeded by Risto Kurkinen
Preceded by Risto Kurkinen	Winner of the Aarne Honkavaara trophy 1987–88	Succeeded by Jukka Vilander
Preceded by Raimo Summanen	Winner of the Aarne Honkavaara trophy 1990–91	Succeeded by Teemu Selänne
Preceded by Matti Hagman	Winner of the Veli-Pekka Ketola trophy 1985–86	Succeeded by Kari Jalonen
Preceded by Harry Nikander	Captain of Ässät; 1982–83	Succeeded by Tapio Levo
