= Arto Heiskanen =

Finnish ice hockey player (1963–2023)

- Born: 23 November 1963 Savonlinna, Finland
- Died: 8 February 2023 (aged 59)
- Height: 6 ft 2 in (188 cm)
- Weight: 198 lb (90 kg; 14 st 2 lb)
- Position: Left wing
- Shot: Right
- Played for: Ässät; Lukko; Brest Albatros Hockey; Newcastle Cobras
- Playing career: 1981–1999

Arto Heiskanen (23 November 1963 – 8 February 2023) was a Finnish professional ice hockey left winger.

Heiskanen played a total of 487 games in the SM-liiga for Ässät and Lukko. He played in the French Élite Ligue for Brest Albatros Hockey, the British Ice Hockey Superleague for the Newcastle Cobras and the Polska Hokej Liga for the SMS Warszawa.

== Career statistics ==
			Regular season					Playoffs
Season	Team	League	GP	G	A	Pts	PIM	GP	G	A	Pts	PIM
1980–81	SaPKo	I-Divisioona	9	0	0	0	0	—	—	—	—	—
1981–82	SaPKo	I-Divisioona	36	19	12	31	23	—	—	—	—	—
1982–83	SaPKo	I-Divisioona	36	20	16	36	44	—	—	—	—	—
1983–84	Porin Ässät	SM-liiga	36	6	7	13	16	9	0	1	1	6
1984–85	Porin Ässät	SM-liiga	31	12	4	16	8	8	3	1	4	2
1985–86	Porin Ässät	SM-liiga	36	22	12	34	28	—	—	—	—	—
1986–87	Lukko	SM-liiga	44	17	16	33	28	—	—	—	—	—
1987–88	Lukko	SM-liiga	26	15	9	24	18	8	4	0	4	8
1988–89	Lukko	SM-liiga	43	27	17	44	14	—	—	—	—	—
1989–90	Porin Ässät	I-Divisioona	44	58	52	110	12	—	—	—	—	—
1990–91	Porin Ässät	SM-liiga	35	22	21	43	10	—	—	—	—	—
1991–92	Porin Ässät	SM-liiga	44	20	15	35	28	8	2	2	4	4
1992–93	Porin Ässät	SM-liiga	41	15	14	29	8	8	5	5	10	4
1993–94	Porin Ässät	SM-liiga	48	17	12	39	34	5	1	2	3	10
1994–95	Porin Ässät	SM-liiga	50	9	10	19	42	7	0	0	0	2
1995–96	Titaanit	I-Divisioona	22	15	16	31	20	—	—	—	—	—
1995–96	Brest Albatros Hockey	France	3	1	0	1	2	1	0	0	0	0
1996–97	Newcastle Cobras	BISL	15	4	4	8	6	6	0	1	1	2
1997–98	ERSC Amberg	Germany2	43	14	17	31	8	—	—	—	—	—
1998–99	SMS I Warszawa	Poland	—	4	0	4	0	—	—	—	—	—
SM-liiga totals			434	182	137	329	234	53	15	11	26	36
