= Patrik Raitanen =

Finnish footballer (born 2001)

Personal information
- Date of birth: 13 June 2001 (age 25)
- Place of birth: Ulvila, Finland
- Height: 1.89 m (6 ft 2 in)
- Position: Defender

Team information
- Current team: FC Jazz
- Number: 29

Youth career
- –2015: FC Ulvila
- 2015–2017: FC Jazz
- 2017–2019: Liverpool
- 2019–2020: Fortuna Sittard
- 2020–2021: SPAL

Senior career*
Years	Team	Apps	(Gls)
2016–2017	FC Jazz	0	(0)
2019–2020	Fortuna Sittard	2	(0)
2021	Klubi 04	16	(0)
2022–2023	→ IFK Mariehamn (loan)	13	(0)
2024–2025	IFK Mariehamn	16	(0)
2026–	FC Jazz	22	(0)

International career^{‡}
2017	Finland U16	3	(0)
2017–2018	Finland U17	7	(0)
2018–2019	Finland U18	7	(0)
2018–2019	Finland U19	7	(0)
2021	Finland U20	2	(0)
- * Club domestic league appearances and goals as of 7 November 2026 ‡ National team caps and goals as of 14 November 2021

Patrik Raitanen (born 13 June 2001) is a Finnish professional footballer who plays as a defender for FC Jazz. Raitanen was born in Ulvila, Finland. He made his debut on senior level in FC Jazz, before signing with Liverpool at age 15 in 2017.

== Club career ==
=== Fortuna Sittard ===
On 21 June 2019, Raitanen signed his first professional contract with Fortuna Sittard. Raitanen made his professional debut with Fortuna Sittard in a 0–0 Eredivisie tie with Sparta Rotterdam on 28 September 2019.

=== SPAL ===
In September 2020 it was announced that Raitanen had signed a deal with Serie B team SPAL and that he would join the U19 team.

=== HJK Helsinki ===
On 16 August 2021 HJK announced that Raitanen has signed a contract with the team. He played with the club's reserve team Klubi 04.

=== IFK Mariehamn ===
On 28 February 2022, Raitanen joined IFK Mariehamn on loan for the 2022 season. His loan was extended for the 2023 season, but early in the pre-season in a Finnish League Cup match against Inter Turku, Raitanen suffered a season-ending knee injury and was ruled out for the whole year.

On 27 January 2024, Raitanen terminated his contract with HJK, and signed a permanent deal with IFK Mariehamn.

Early in the pre-season in January 2025, a Finnish League Cup match against Inter Turku, Raitanen suffered a season-ending knee injury again and was ruled out for the whole year.

== International career ==
He made his debut on international level on 13 April 2016 playing for Finland national under-15 football team in a match against Poland U15.

== Outside football ==
Besides playing professional football, Raitanen has worked as a model.

Later after his time at Fortuna Sittard, Raitanen spoke to Finnish media about how he was openly discriminated in the club by his first team head coach Kevin Hofland, because of the way he looked and how he dressed.

== Career statistics ==
As of 27 January 2025

Appearances and goals by club, season and competition
Club	Season	League			Cup (Note: Includes Suomen Cup)		League cup (Note: Includes Finnish League Cup)		Europe		Total	
Club	Season	Division	Apps	Goals	Apps	Goals	Apps	Goals	Apps	Goals	Apps	Goals
Jazz	2017	Kakkonen	0	0	2	0	—		—		2	0
Fortuna Sittard	2019–20	Eredivisie	2	0	0	0	—		—		2	0
Klubi 04	2021	Ykkönen	10	0	0	0	—		—		10	0
IFK Mariehamn (loan)	2022	Veikkausliiga	13	0	3	0	0	0	—		16	0
IFK Mariehamn (loan)	2023	Veikkausliiga	0	0	0	0	3	0	—		3	0
IFK Mariehamn (loan)	Total		13	0	3	0	3	0	0	0	19	0
IFK Mariehamn	2024	Veikkausliiga	16	0	2	0	4	0	—		22	0
IFK Mariehamn	2025	Veikkausliiga	0	0	0	0	1	0	–		1	0
IFK Mariehamn	Total		16	0	2	0	5	0	0	0	23	0
Career total			41	0	7	0	8	0	0	0	56	0

== Personal life ==
Raitanen is the son of the Finnish former hockey player Rauli Raitanen.
