= Harry Nikander =

- Born: June 18, 1957 Seinäjoki, Finland
- Died: September 10, 2004 (aged 47) Huittinen, FInland
- Height: 184 cm (6 ft 0 in)
- Weight: 87 kg (192 lb; 13 st 10 lb)
- Position: Defence
- Shot: RIght
- Played for: HC Ässät Pori; Luleå HF
- National team: Finland
- Playing career: 1975–1993

Harry Nikander (18 June 1957 – 10 September 2004) was a Finnish professional ice hockey defenseman.

== Career ==
He played most of his career with the HC Ässät Pori, playing one season with Luleå HF.

Nikander played 616 games for Ässät, recording 162 points for the club. He played in the 1986 IIHF World Championship for Finland. He won the FInnish Championship with Ässät in 1978.

After his career Nikander became an alcoholic and he engaged in criminal activity. He died at 47 years old in 2004.
