= Antti Heikkilä =

Finnish ice hockey player (born 1943)

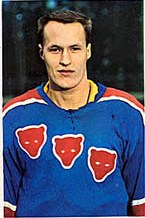
- Born: October 30, 1943 (age 81) Pori, Finland
- Height: 184 cm (6 ft 0 in)
- Weight: 87 kg (192 lb; 13 st 10 lb)
- Position: Defence
- Shot: Left
- Played for: Porin Karhut; Porin Ässät
- Coached for: Porin Ässät
- National team: Finland
- Playing career: 1961–1981
- Coaching career: 1981–1986

Antti Heikkilä (born October 30, 1943, in Pori, Finland) is a Finnish former hockey player and hockey influencer. During his active career, he played as a defender. Antti Heikkilä and his brother, Lasse, have been important influences in the development of ice hockey in the city of Pori.

Heikkilä played the 1966 World Ice Hockey Championships for Finland. He was inducted into the Finnish Hockey Hall of Fame in 1988.

== Career ==
Antti Heikkilä played in Pori Karhut and Ässät for a total of 20 seasons from 1961 to 1981 SM-sarja and SM-liiga. He won three Finnish championships and a total of 6 medals. Heikkilä accumulated 561 matches and 144 + 116 points in the regular season. In addition, he played 29 playoff matches with 15 points. Ässät have retired Antti Heikkilä's number 2. Antti Heikkilä got to play in the national team in 11 U20 national matches, scoring 1 + 2. He represented Finland once at the World Championships, in 1966.
