= Raimo Lahti =

Raimo Otto Kalervo Lahti was born 12 January 1946 in Jyväskylä rural commune, Finland. He has been professor of Criminal Law at the University of Helsinki since 1979, and has been involved with reform of the Finnish Medical Law and Criminal Law. He has also served as an expert for committees of the Finnish Parliament and the Finnish National Authority for Medicolegal Affairs (TEO). Between 2005 and 2009, he was an ad litem Judge to the International Criminal court for the former Yugoslavia (ICTY)
