= Rauli Raitanen =

Finnish ice hockey player

- Born: 14 January 1970 (age 56) Pori, FIN
- Height: 6 ft 2 in (188 cm)
- Weight: 208 lb (94 kg; 14 st 12 lb)
- Position: Right wing
- Shot: Left
- Played for: SM-liiga; Ässät (1987–1996, 1997–1998); Tappara (1998–1999); Elitserien; MoDo (1996–1997); Division 2 Växjö Lakers (2000–2001)
- National team: Finland
- NHL draft: 182nd overall, 1990; Winnipeg Jets
- Playing career: 1987–2001

Medal record

Men's ice hockey

Representing Finland

World Championships
| Silver medal – second place | 1992 Czechoslovakia | Ice hockey |

Rauli Raitanen (born 14 January 1970) is a retired Finnish ice hockey player. He was drafted by Winnipeg Jets (9th round, 182nd overall) in 1990 NHL entry draft.

== International career ==
Raitanen played a total 33 internationals for the Finland national ice hockey team. He was a member of the Finland squad in the 1992 World Ice Hockey Championships.

== Personal life ==
Rauli Raitanen is the father of the footballer Patrik Raitanen who played for Fortuna Sittard.

== Career statistics ==
| | | | Regular season | | | | | Playoffs |
| Season | Team | League | GP | G | A | Pts | PIM | GP | G | A | Pts | PIM |
|---|---|---|---|---|---|---|---|---|---|---|---|---|
| 1987–88 | Porin Ässät U20 | Jr. A SM-sarja | 29 | 10 | 13 | 23 | 18 | — | — | — | — | — |
| 1987–88 | Porin Ässät | SM-liiga | 18 | 1 | 5 | 6 | 2 | — | — | — | — | — |
| 1988–89 | Porin Ässät U20 | Jr. A SM-sarja | — | — | — | — | — | 3 | 0 | 1 | 1 | 0 |
| 1988–89 | Porin Ässät | SM-liiga | 40 | 21 | 17 | 38 | 18 | — | — | — | — | — |
| 1989–90 | Porin Ässät | I-Divisioona | 41 | 17 | 44 | 61 | 20 | — | — | — | — | — |
| 1990–91 | Porin Ässät U20 | Jr. A SM-sarja | 4 | 2 | 5 | 7 | 4 | 4 | 0 | 1 | 1 | 8 |
| 1990–91 | Porin Ässät | SM-liiga | 43 | 6 | 16 | 22 | 14 | — | — | — | — | — |
| 1991–92 | Porin Ässät | SM-liiga | 41 | 12 | 22 | 34 | 34 | 8 | 1 | 5 | 6 | 2 |
| 1992–93 | Porin Ässät | SM-liiga | 43 | 15 | 20 | 35 | 28 | 8 | 0 | 4 | 4 | 6 |
| 1993–94 | Porin Ässät | SM-liiga | 48 | 15 | 25 | 40 | 50 | 5 | 1 | 1 | 2 | 4 |
| 1994–95 | Porin Ässät | SM-liiga | 50 | 17 | 18 | 35 | 70 | 6 | 0 | 2 | 2 | 2 |
| 1995–96 | Porin Ässät | SM-liiga | 50 | 5 | 18 | 23 | 79 | 3 | 1 | 2 | 3 | 4 |
| 1996–97 | Modo Hockey | Elitserien | 44 | 10 | 9 | 19 | 16 | — | — | — | — | — |
| 1997–98 | Porin Ässät | SM-liiga | 43 | 12 | 9 | 21 | 46 | 3 | 1 | 2 | 3 | 0 |
| 1998–99 | Porin Ässät | SM-liiga | 7 | 0 | 0 | 0 | 0 | — | — | — | — | — |
| 1998–99 | Tappara | SM-liiga | 42 | 5 | 2 | 7 | 16 | — | — | — | — | — |
| 1999–00 | West Coast Titans | 2. Divisioona | 14 | 7 | 14 | 21 | 28 | — | — | — | — | — |
| 2000–01 | Växjö Lakers HC | Division 2 | — | 0 | 6 | 6 | — | — | — | — | — | — |
| SM-liiga totals | | | 425 | 109 | 152 | 261 | 357 | 38 | 5 | 16 | 21 | 24 |
