= HC Ässät Pori =

Ice hockey club in Pori, Finland

Porin Ässät
- City: Pori
- League: Liiga
- Founded: 1967
- Home arena: Isomäki Ice Hall (capacity: 6,150)
- Colors: Red, black, white
- Owner: HC Ässät Pori Oy
- CEO: Sami Hautamäki
- General manager: Jarno Kultanen
- Head coach: Jarno Pikkarainen
- Captain: Peter Tiivola
- Media: Satakunnan Kansa; Radio Pori
- Affiliates: Kuparikiekko (2 div.); LuKi −82 (2 div.)
- Website: assat.com

Championships
- Regular season titles: 1978–79
- Kanada-malja: 3 (1970–71, 1977–78, 2012–13)

Current uniform
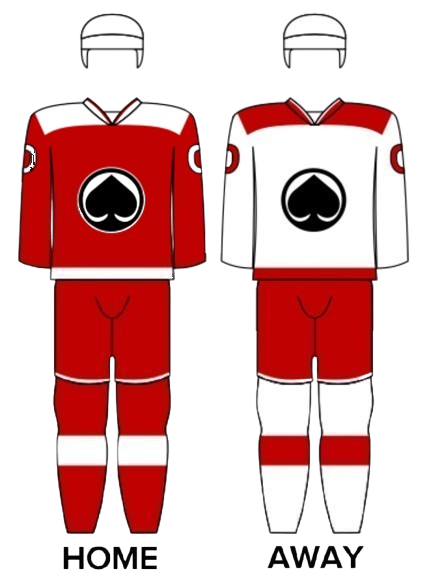

Porin Ässät (Finnish pronunciation: [ˈporin æsːæt]; Finnish for Pori Aces), officially named Hockey Club Ässät Pori and colloquially known as Pata, (Note: Other nicknames for the club include Punakone, Pubijoukkue, Patasydämet and Patapaidat) is a professional ice hockey club based in Pori, Finland. It competes in the Liiga, the highest-ranking league of ice hockey in Finland. Since 1971, Ässät has played its games in the Isomäki Ice Hall. (Note: Ässät played on the outdoor artificial ice rink of Isomäki from 1967 to 1971)

The team was founded in 1967 due to a merger of two local sports clubs, Rosenlewin Urheilijat-38 and Porin Karhut. Ässät originally competed in the SM-sarja, which was replaced by the SM-liiga in 1975, making Ässät one of the ten original SM-liiga teams. Ässät was relegated to the I-Divisioona for the 1989–90 season, but it was promoted back to the SM-liiga after just one season.

Ässät has won the Kanada-malja championship three times (in 1971, 1978 and 2013); it also won the Finnish Cup once in 1967. Ässät has a total of nine medals in the upper tier of Finnish ice hockey, with four of them being silver and two of them being bronze. Ässät has been awarded the Aaro Kivilinna Memorial Trophy once in the 1979–80 season. Ässät won a European Cup bronze medal in 1979.

== History ==
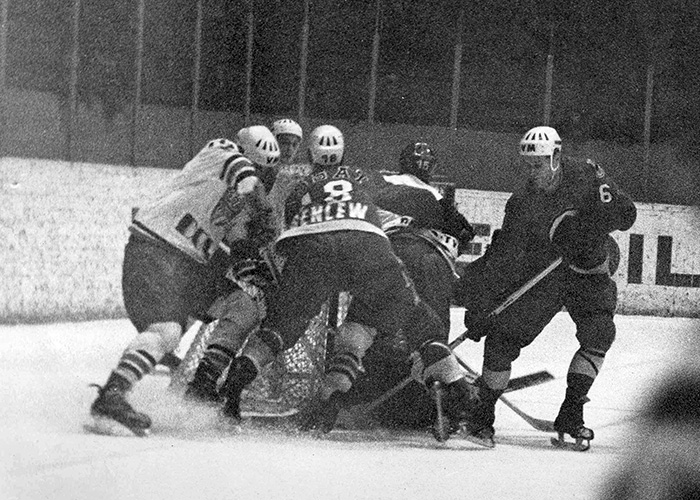
Ässät playing against Tappara Tampere in 1969.

The Porin Ässät was established in June 1967 when two local sports clubs, Rosenlewin Urheilijat-38 and Porin Karhut, merged their sports operations. Although the RU-38 won the SM-sarja championship in 1967, the Rosenlew company seriously considered giving up sports activities, since it felt that hockey did not bring enough positive publicity to the company. The leaders of Karhut and RU-38 negotiated the unification of the clubs during the spring and early summer so secretly that the insiders of the teams did not get to know about the merger negotiations. Karhut benefited less economically from the merger, since the club had invested in player acquisitions to the point where its income did not cover expenses, especially after the Rosenlew club gained sponsors at Karhut's expense. As Rosenlew was abandoning its sports club, it was suggested that the RU-38 was merged into Karhut. When an agreement was finally reached, Rosenlew took over a portion of Karhut's debts and promised to support the new team financially in its early years. The new club was named Porin Ässät. The birth of the club was announced at the end of June 1967. The name of the club was given by Vilho Santala, who acted as a negotiator in uniting the clubs and was elected the first chairman of Ässät. The club's logo was designed by Vesa Antikainen. The colors of the club were red, black and white.

The early days of Ässät did not go smoothly, with a heated atmosphere developing between the formerly Karhut and RU-38 players who were now on the same team. The merger of the two top clubs also raised hopes of a very strong team, but one line of national team-level players joined different teams, and the players who left were mainly RU-38 players from the previous season. The first team of Ässät thus consisted mainly of Karhut players.

The first games of Ässät went well, and even before the start of the 1967 SM-sarja season, Ässät won the Suomen Cup championship. In the final match played in Savonlinna, Ässät beat SaPKo 7–0. Thanks to inheriting the RU-38 championship, Ässät also played in the 1968 European Cup, where it won its first two rounds before being beaten by SC Dynamo Berlin in the quarter-finals.

In its first season in the 1967–68 SM-sarja, Ässät placed fourth with Rauli Virtanen's coaching. The new club did not receive unreserved support from the people of Pori, as the number of spectators decreased by 10,000 from the last season of Karhut. In the second season of Ässät attendance started to rise, with the numbers rising to the same level as Karhut had. Lasse Heikkilä, the former coach of Karhut, became the coach for the second season and served as the team's coach until 1974 and later in 1976–1981. In the 1968–69 season, Ässät were again fourth. For the following season, 1969–70, Ässät suffered two heavy losses when Veli-Pekka Ketola and Alpo Suhonen left for Jokerit for a year. Ässät finished sixth in the series.

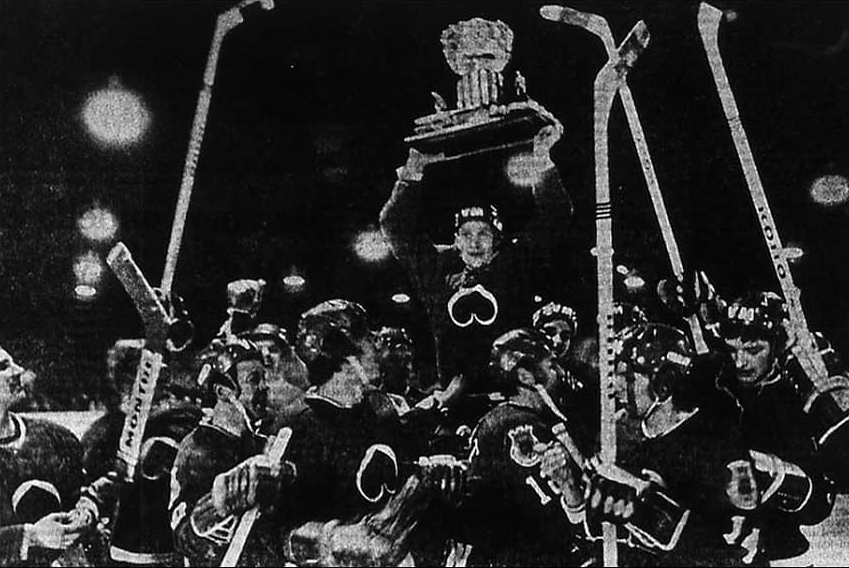
Porin Ässät celebrating their first ever Finnish Championship in 1971.

For the season 1970–71, Ässät got a high-class returnee from Helsinki when Veli-Pekka Ketola returned to Pori after playing for one season in Jokerit. Alpo Suhonen also returned to Ässät after Ketola. Ketola's return to his home club gave rise to a huge training enthusiasm in other players as well, and coach Lasse Heikkilä took the team on a training trip to Moscow before the start of the season. The trip to the Soviet Union started training very early, by the standards of the time, because there was no ice on Pori in early autumn. In the 1970–71 season Ässät finished third in the regular season after Jokerit and HIFK. In the final series, everything fell into place, Ässät lost only one of their ten matches and overtook the Helsinki clubs ahead. The gold medals were finally secured by a five-point difference to the Jokerit who came in second. The first championship came under the leadership of the forward trio Erkki Väkiparta – Veli-Pekka Ketola – Tapio Koskinen. Other lines behind No. 1 were also able to provide to the team. There were also big names in the defense, such as Antti Heikkilä and Pekka Rautakallio. Veli-pekka Ketola was the highest point scorer in the SM-sarja during the 1970–71 season with 42 points, of which 25 were goals and 17 were assists. Ässät's captain during the season was Raimo Kilpiö. Ässät's number one goalie was Jorma Valtonen who played every game of the season. Valtonen finished the season with a .922 save percentage.

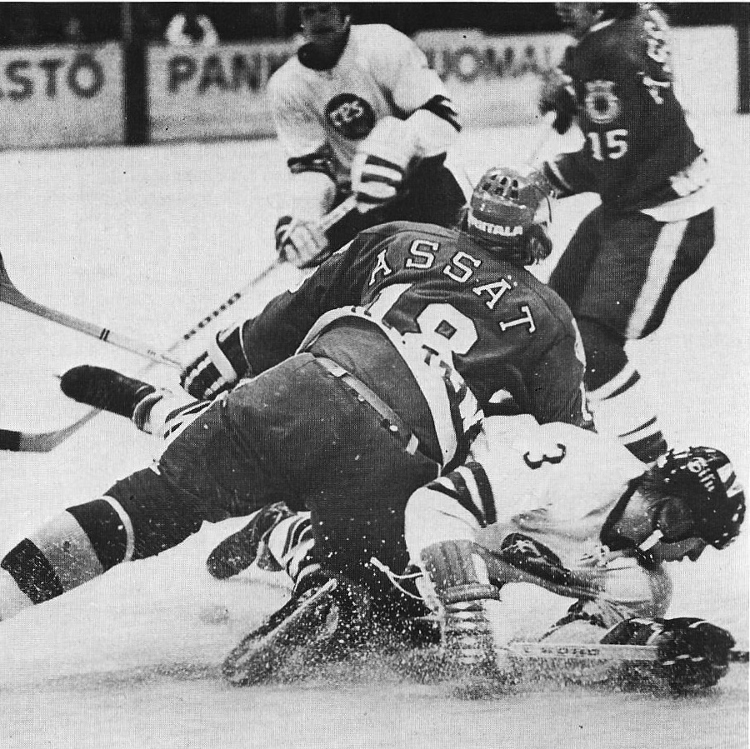
Jaakko Niemi (number 18) delivering a crushing hit to a HC TPS player in the 1970s.

For the 1975–76 season, Ässät joined the newly formed SM-liiga, making it one of the original ten clubs in the league. Not much was expected from the team. The worst loss was Pekka Rautakallio's departure to North America. However, promising young players joined Ässät; Tapio Levo filled the gap left by Rautakallio. The net was blocked by the young Antero Kivelä. The young Ässät team showed their potential in the series by beating the clubs that were predicted to be at top of the series. It was worst experienced by the future champion TPS, who Ässät beat 14–0. However, the access for Ässät to the top four in the playoffs was only decided in the final round against Lukko. In the semi-finals, Ässät challenged Tappara, who advanced to the finals 2–0. In the bronze matches against HIFK, Ässät's hunger for victory was greater and the team took the bronze winning the series 2–0.

The 1977–78 season again raised hopes of success when Pekka Rautakallio and Veli-Pekka Ketola returned to Ässät from North America. In addition, promising young people played in the club, such as Arto Javanainen, Kari Makkonen, Tapio Levo and Harry Nikander. Ässät finished second in the regular season after Tappara and defeated TPS 3–2 in the semi-finals. The final series against Tappara did not start promisingly, as Tappara won the first match in Tampere 8–0. However, Ässät won the rest of the games, and the club achieved its second Finnish Championship. The last match at the Porin jäähalli (now Isomäki Areena) was estimated to have been attended by more than 13,000 spectators, even though only 8,600 spectators should have been allowed into the arena at that time. There were more spectators in the arena than in any other previous hockey match played in Finland. In the early years of the SM-liiga in the second half of the 1970s, Ässät was one of the league's absolute top teams. The most important player on the team was the captain, center Veli-Pekka Ketola, who had returned from the North American WHA League. Ketola broke the point record in the playoffs at the time.

The season that followed the championship, 1978–79, went as expected for Ässät in the regular season. The team won it by five points to Tappara. In the semi-finals, Ässät knocked out HIFK with a win of 3-0 and advanced to the final against Tappara. Last year's finalists struggled again for the championship. The final series became a thrilling play. Tappara won the first two matches, Ässät the next two and the final series thus stretched to the fifth, decisive match. The match played in Pori ended with Tappara's 2–5 victory, so Ässät was left with silver. Ässät finished 3rd in the 1978–79 IIHF European Cup.

In the following season, 1979–80, Ässät were nowhere near the previous season in the regular season, finishing fourth. In the semi-finals, TPS was defeated by Ässät 3–1, winning the finals for the third time in a row. HIFK came up against Ässät. HIFK took the championship 3–0, so Ässät were silver medallists again.

After the silver seasons, Ässät suffered bad losses when Veli-Pekka Ketola went back to North America. Tapio Levo also joined the NHL. In addition, Risto Tuomi and Veli-Matti Ruisma went to the Swedish league and Erkki Väkiparta retired. In the following seasons, Ässät placed in the middle caste of the SM-Liiga. For the 1983–84 season, the team received well-known returnees when Tapio Levo returned from the NHL and Risto Tuomi and Harry Nikander from Sweden. The team was also strengthened by its own juniors, from whom more top players of the future were emerging; In addition to Javanainen and Levo, Kari Takko and Christian Ruuttu, among others. The team placed second in the regular season and beat Oulun Kärpät 3–2 in the semi-finals. In the finals, the opponent was again Tappara. The series was close. Ässät won the first match in overtime but Tappara took the next three. The overtime goal of the decisive match secured Tappara the championship with 3–1 victories.

Ässät was relegated to the I-Divisioona after the 1988–89 season. Ässät won 37 of their 44 games in the 1989–90 I-Divisioona season, and played against JoKP in the SM-liiga qualification series, beating them and being promoted back to the league. In the 1990s, one of Ässät's achievements was a bronze medal in 1995, beating rival team Rauman Lukko in the bronze game.

After the 1997–98 season, Ässät's playing success no longer carried the team into the playoffs, and the following years were quite a toddler at every level of the organization. Bankruptcy was not far off, and senior officials were arrested on suspicion of tax evasion, although charges were subsequently dropped. The base quotation was the season 2000–01, when Ässät were the last in the league.

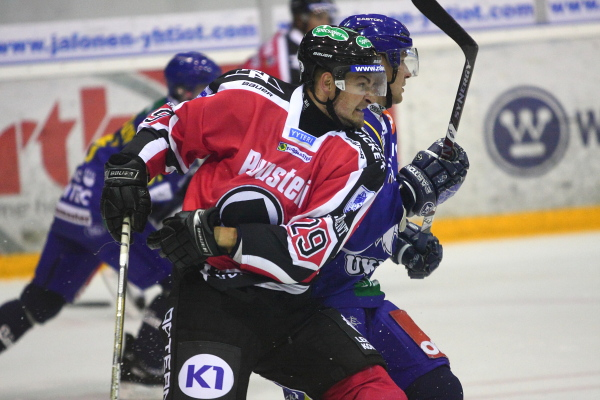
Ässät player Patrik Forsbacka, a player known for fighting and physical play, in a matchup between Ässät and Lukko.

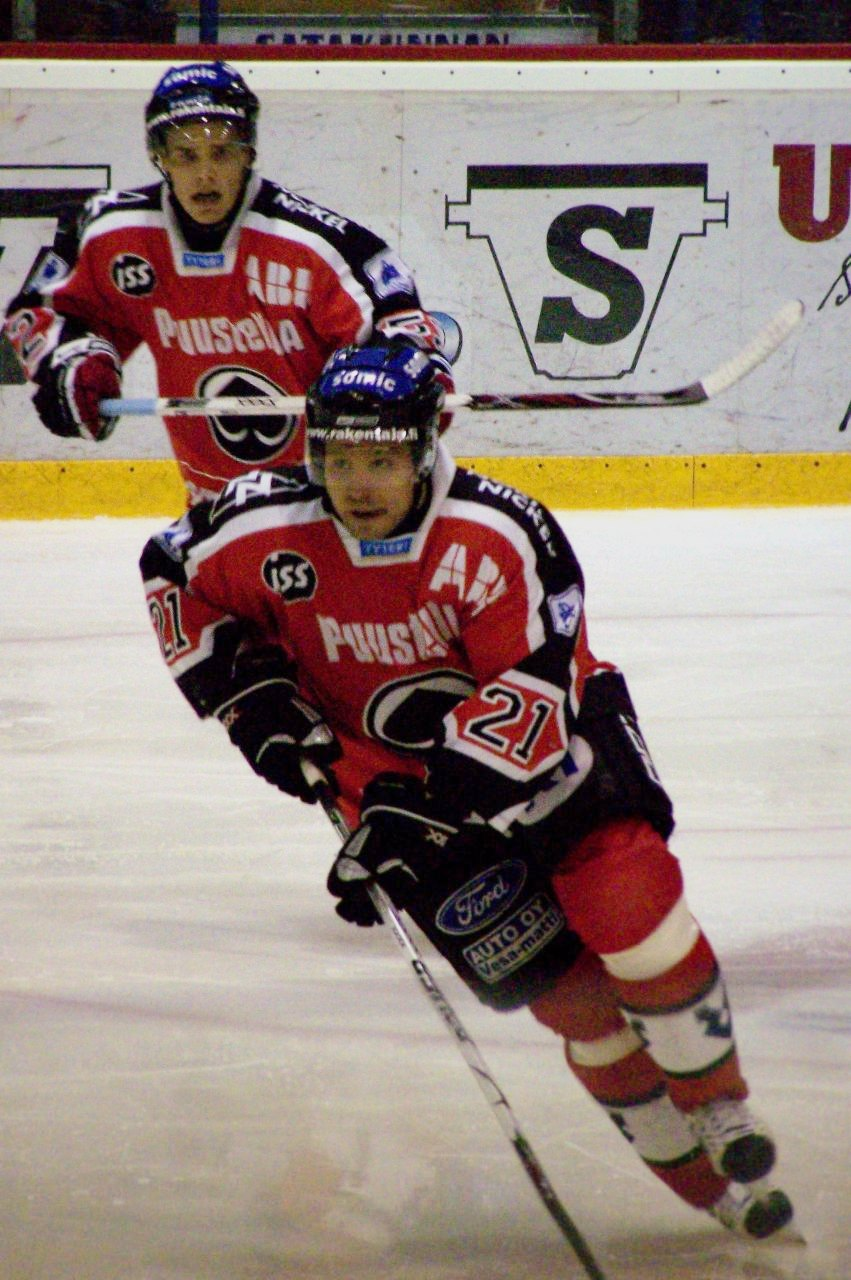
Marko Kivenmäki and Ville Uusitalo with Ässät in 2008

Ässät played in the 2006 SM-liiga finals, but got beaten by HPK Hämeenlinna. Ässät and Sport met in the 2009 SM-liiga qualifiers. Sport played in the second tier Mestis, and Ässät played in the SM-liiga. Ässät beat sport in seven games, winning the last game 3–0. After the series, Ässät fined Sport for €2,000 for broken benches in the arena. The biggest scandal happened when Sport's coach Juhani Tamminen commented on the series and the whole league system in a press conference. Tamminen blamed the league for Sport's loss in the series, calling it unfair. Tamminen had also threatened Ässät's assistant coach Pasi Kaukoranta by telling him that he will rip his head off after Kaukoranta had allegedly provoked him. Tamminen was fined €2,500 by the league.

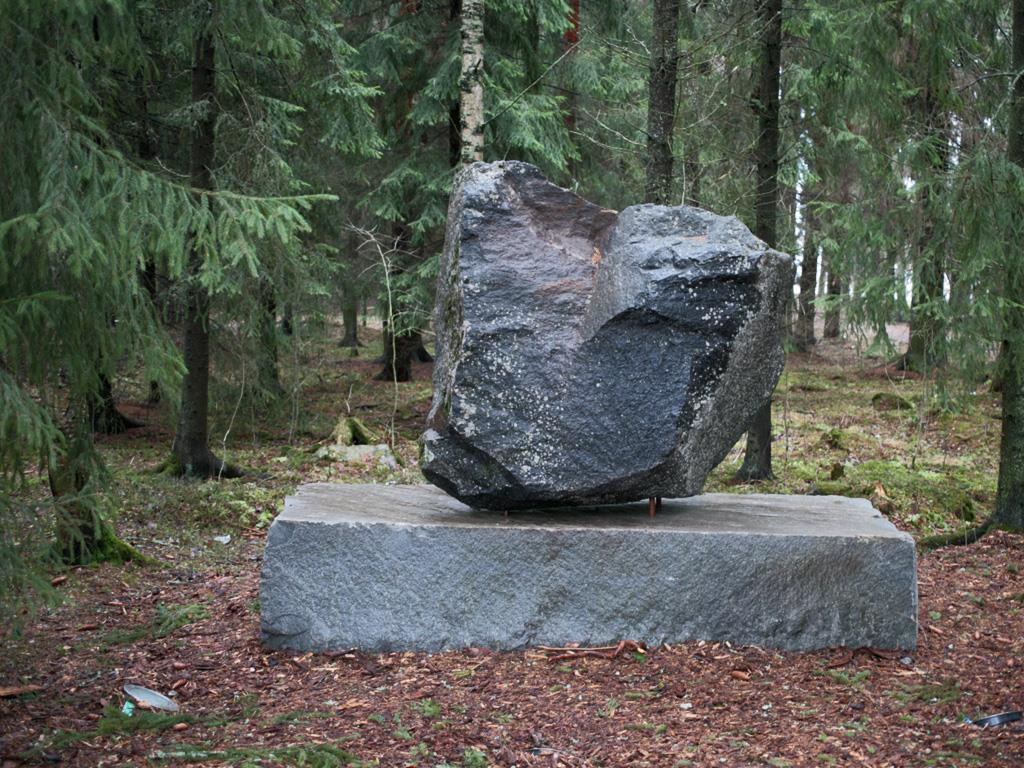
"The Stone of victory" is a stone that was moved to Pori next to the Isomäki Ice Hall to honor the 2013 Finnish Champions.

The 2012–13 season went differently for Ässät. It started the season strongly, but by the turn of the year had fallen below the playoff line. The team sold its No. 1 center, Stephen Dixon to a KHL team Lokomotiv Yaroslavl. At the end of January Ässät started the longest winning streak in their history, ending only in the last previous round of the regular season with an overtimetime loss against Oulu Kärpät. The standings rose to twelfth to fourth. In the quarterfinals, Ässät won KalPa 4–1. Semi-finals against JyP Ässät started with an overtime win when Michael Ryan scored the winning time in 92.51. Ässät won the second match in Pori 2–0 and the third in Jyväskylä 1–4. JyP narrowed the situation with their 1–2 away victory, but Ässät won the fifth match 0–1 and advanced to the finals. Tappara won the first final 2–1 after Jukka Peltola scored five seconds before the end of the regular time. The second final match in Pori was won by Ässät 5–1. In the third match, Tappara was better with 3–2 goals, and the winning goal was scored by Niclas Lucenius just one second before the end of the actual game time. Ässät won the fourth match 4–0 in their home arena. In the fifth final match, Ässät took the away victory with goals 1–2. Veli-Matti Savinainen finished the winning goal from Ville Uusitalo's pass in the third overtime in 108.59. The match was the longest final match in SM-liiga history and the third longest in all playoffs. Ässät won the Finnish Championship after winning Tappara in the sixth final 3–2 with Jyri Marttinen's goal, and at the same time the whole series was won by Ässät 4–2. The Pori team had won their previous championship in 1978. A real generational change was seen after the match, when the captain of the 1978 championship team, Veli-Pekka Ketola, came on the ice to hand over the Kanada malja to captain Ville Uusitalo.

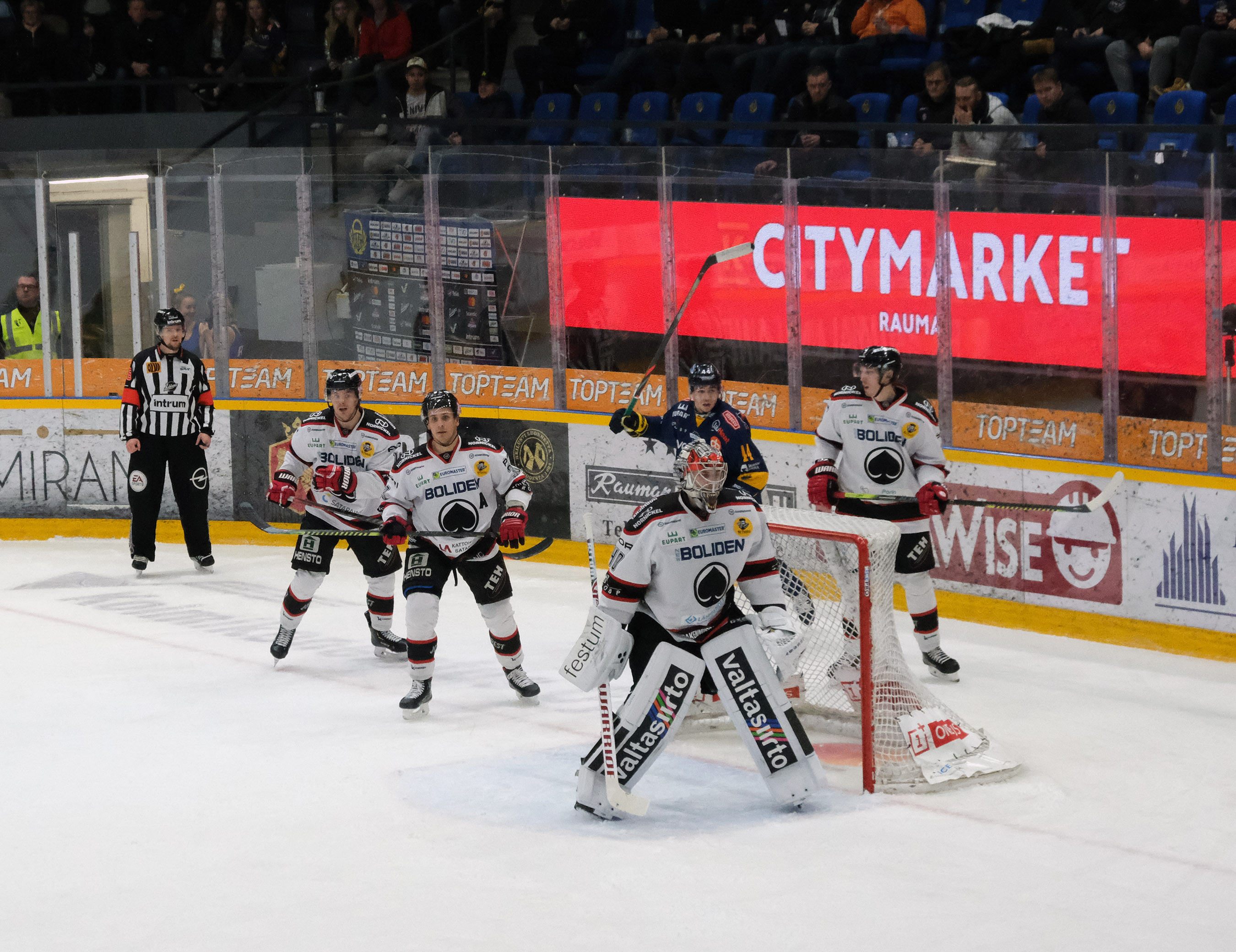
Ässät playing against Lukko in 2019

In the 2017–18 season, Ässät played strongly. Jesperi Kotkaniemi was promoted to the SM-liiga line-up from the U20 league. During the World Championship break in November, Ässät strengthened their team with high-class returnees when Jarno Kärki, who moved to Tappara at the end of the previous season, and Sakari Salminen, who had played abroad for many years, returned. In January, Tommi Taimi returned to Ässät. Ässät were among the top six in the regular season throughout the autumn season, returning to 4th place after the Christmas break. After this, though, Ässät's playing worsened and they fired head coach Jyrki Aho. The course of Ässät improved and the team started to win again, finishing in 8th place at the end of the regular season. Ässät sent Lukko directly to the summer holidays with a 2–0 series win and advanced to the semi-finals against Oulun Kärpät. In the series against Kärpät, Ässät were able to challenge them, but the Kärpät eventually won the series 4–1.

In 2024, Ässät won the U20 Finnish Championship, beating HC TPS in four games. Ässät's goaltender Topias Rovio was chosen as the playoffs MVP. The championship was the second in club history, as they also won it in 1980.

== Team identity ==
=== Crest and uniform design ===
Ässät's primary logo is a spade inside a black ring. Ässät has used variations of the logo, for example the logo from 1982 to 1994, which had a white "Ässät" text on top of the original logo. The logo was designed by Vesa Antikainen.

The club's home uniforms have always been red with another color, usually black or white. The original jersey of Ässät was completely red. Ässät's home uniform since the 2022–23 season has been red with a small white stripe on the bottom part of the jersey and with white on the shoulders; the team's players also wear red pants, red socks with a white stripe, and a white helmet. The away jersey is white with a red stripe on the bottom and with red on the shoulders, and is worn along with red pants, white socks with a red stripe, and a white helmet. In 2023, Ässät added a black-red alternate jersey with a bear logo.

From the early 2000s until 2023, Ässät had used a secondary logo, which was just the primary logo with a red "Ässät" text above it. In 2023 Ässät added red-black bear logo, which included elements from the predecessor clubs of Ässät, like the crown for Rosenlewin Urheilijat-38 and the bear for the Porin Karhut. The logo also had two "hidden" spades that are from the official Ässät logo. The secondary logo was used in the alternate jerseys and merchandise. The bear is a big part of the club's identity as it appears in the coat of arms of Pori as well as in the Swedish language name of Pori, "Björneborg". The bear logo was dropped in 2025 after the Chicago Bears claimed it looked too similar to their logo.

=== Mascot ===
Ässät's mascot has been Rysty Mesikämmen since 2017. Rysty Mesikämmen is a brown bear who wears an ice hockey helmet and Ässät's jersey with the number 67.

=== Rivalries and fans ===
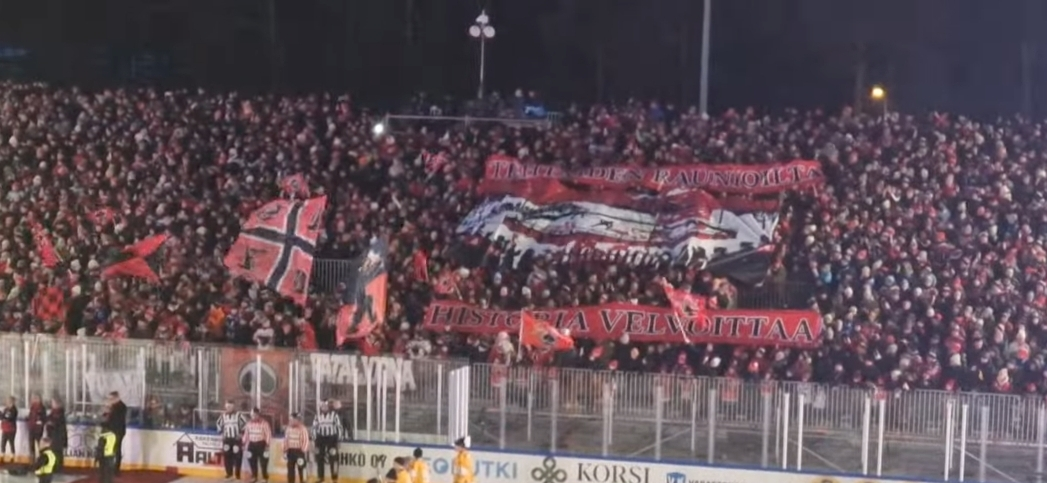
Ässät's official fan organization Pataljoona at the 2025 Satakunta Winter Classic against rivals Rauman Lukko.

Ässät's main rivals are considered to be Rauman Lukko and Vaasan Sport.

Ässät has an official supporter organization called Pataljoona (Finnish for "Battalion"). It is known for its chants, tifos, and flags in Ässät's home and away games.

==== Rauman Lukko ====
Ässät and Lukko are rivals mainly because of how their cities are located in the same region and how their arenas are about 50 kilometers from each other. Ässät's largest victory against the two teams came in 1978, when Ässät beat Lukko 17–3 on home ice. The rivalry has been nicknamed the "Satakunnan derby".

==== Vaasan Sport ====
Ässät's rivalry against Vaasan Sport grew during the 2009 SM-liiga qualifiers. Ässät beat Sport in the game with seven of the qualifiers and thus kept its spot in the SM-liiga. The games between the clubs are known as the "Kasitien derby".

==== IFK Helsingfors ====
Ässät has a rivalry with IFK Helsingfors. The games are known to be heated and have multiple instances of fighting. During the 2024–25 season two HIFK players were penalized for kicking Ässät players.

== Season-by-season record ==
This is a list of the last five seasons completed by Ässät.

Note: GP = Games played, W = Wins, OTW = Overtime Wins, OTL = Overtime Losses, L = Losses, Pts = Points, GF = Goals for, GA = Goals against

Season	GP	W	OTW	OTL	L	Pts	GF	GA	Finish	Playoffs
2019–20	59	20	4	8	27	76	141	170	9	Playoffs cancelled due to COVID-19
2020–21	58	15	6	9	28	66 (1.14) (Note: season standings were decided by points per game instead of points since COVID-19 regulations didn't allow all teams to play a full season of 60 games)	150	193	12	Did not qualify
2021–22	60	11	7	6	36	53 (.294) (Note: season standings were decided by point percentage instead of points since COVID-19 regulations didn't allow all teams to play a full season of 60 games)	127	181	15	Did not qualify
2022–23	60	25	5	6	24	91	129	150	8	Lost in quarterfinals, 1–4 (Ilves)
2023–24	60	19	7	10	24	81	136	144	11	Did not qualify

== Players and personnel ==
=== Current roster ===
Updated 27 October 2025.

No.	Nat	Player	Pos	S/G	Age	Acquired	Birthplace
92	(Finland)	Arttu Alasiurua	LW	L	21	2026	Kiiminki, Finland
30	(Czech Republic)	Jan Bednář	G	L	24	2025	Karlovy Vary, Czech Republic
35	(Finland)	Pyry Lammi	G	L	18	2022	Ikaalinen, Finland
39	(Finland)	Filip Lindberg	G	L	27	2025	Espoo, Finland
3	(Finland)	Aleksi Anttalainen	D	L	27	2024	Turku, Finland
25	(Finland)	Lasse Boelius	D	L	19	2021	Pori, Finland
38	(Finland)	Miro Karjalainen	D	R	30	2024	Vihti, Finland
37	(Finland)	Rami Määttä (A)	D	L	24	2018	Oulu, Finland
10	(Sweden)	Oskar Nilsson (A)	D	L	35	2025	Luleå, Sweden
80	(Finland)	Petteri Nurmi	D	L	24	2025	Helsinki, Finland
67	(Finland)	Kasper Puutio (A)	D	R	24	2024	Vaasa, Finland
55	(Finland)	Petteri Riihinen	D	R	25	2025	Mäntsälä, Finland
8	(Finland)	Valtteri Viljanen	D	R	32	2024	Pori, Finland
78	(France)	Dylan Fabre	W	L	26	2023	Grenoble, France
19	(Finland)	Patrik Juhola	C	L	23	2019	Ylöjärvi, Finland
44	(Finland)	Jan-Mikael Järvinen (C)	C	L	38	2022	Pirkkala, Finland
86	(Finland)	Feetu Knihti	C/LW	L	23	2017	Kiukainen, Finland
63	(Finland)	Sakari Kostilainen	F	L	20	2024	Helsinki, Finland
9	(Finland)	Valtteri Lipiäinen	RW	R	29	2024	Lappeenranta, Finland
26	(Kazakhstan)	Alexander Kim	LW/C	R	21	2025	Astana, Kazakhstan
16	(Finland)	Nestor Noiva	RW	R	22	2023	Helsinki, Finland
75	(Finland)	Linus Nyman	LW	L	27	2025	Helsinki, Finland
88	(Sweden)	Johan Olofsson	RW	R	32	2025	Arvika, Sweden
14	(Hungary)	Balázs Sebők	C/RW	L	32	2025	Budapest, Hungary
20	(Finland)	Roope Talaja	LW	L	38	2022	Kuopio, Finland
47	(Finland)	Jonne Tammela	W	L	29	2024	Ylivieska, Finland
74	(Finland)	Peter Tiivola (A)	C	L	33	2024	Helsinki, Finland
93	(Finland)	Lassi Vanhatalo	W	L	28	2023	Tampere, Finland
18	(Finland)	Otso Ylitalo	C/LW	L	21	2023	Oulu, Finland

=== Retired numbers ===
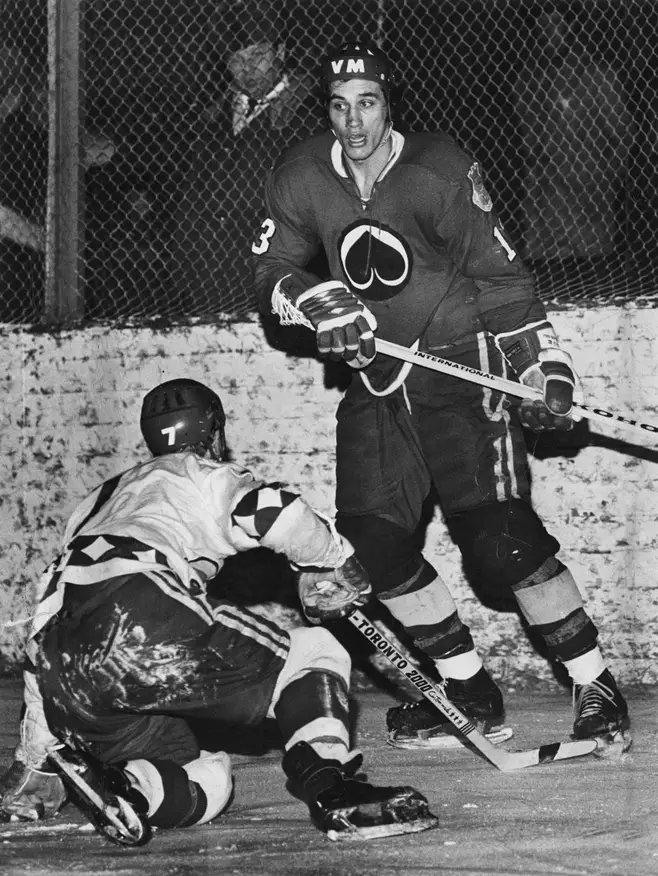
Veli-Pekka Ketola's number, 13, has been retired by Ässät

All of Ässät's retired numbers are hanging from the rafters of the arena except for Jaroslav Otevřel's number.

List of retired numbers:

Ässät retired numbers
No.	Player	Position	Career	Date of retirement
2	Antti Heikkilä	D	1967–1981	
4	Arto Javanainen	RW	1976–1984; 1985–1987; 1989–1994	
5	Pekka Rautakallio	D	1968–1975; 1977–1979	27 January 2024
11	Raimo Kilpiö	F	1967–1977	21 September 2019
12	Tapio Levo	D	1972–1981; 1983–1992	21 November 2007
13 (Note: The number 13 was also retired by Ässät in 2015 for Lasse Heikkilä in the honor of the Porin Karhut. It is considered that the player is retired in Karhut, not Ässät.)	Veli-Pekka Ketola	C	1967–1974; 1977–1981	22 November 2007 (Note: Originally retired in 2003, un-retired in 2004 but re-retired in 2007)
22	Kari Makkonen	LW	1974–1979; 1980–1991	2 February 2024
89	Jaroslav Otevřel	LW	1994–1996	11 February 1996

=== Captains ===
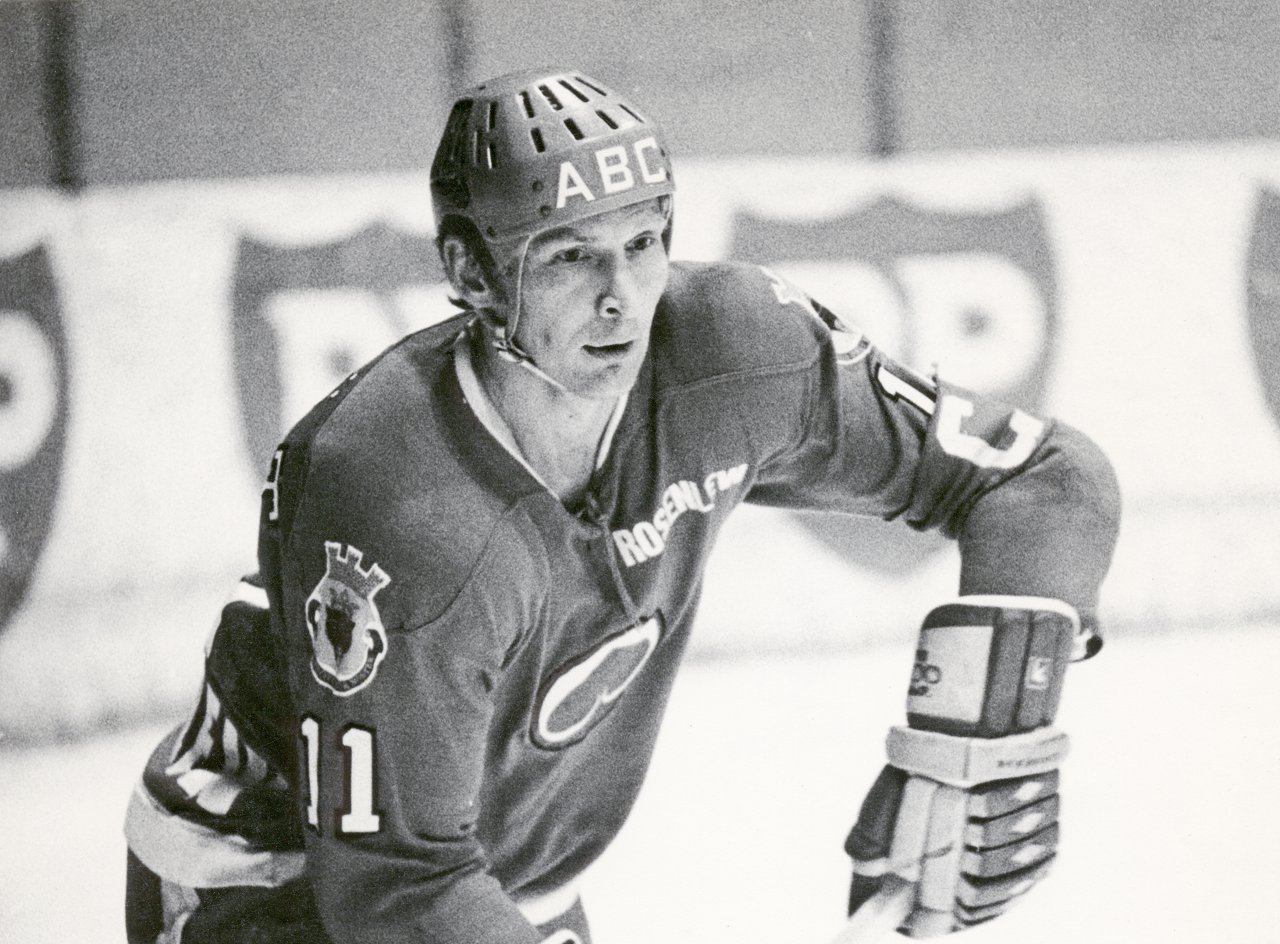
Raimo Kilpiö, HC Ässät's first captain, in 1967.

- Raimo Kilpiö, 1967–1977
- Veli-Pekka Ketola, 1977–1981
- Harry Nikander, 1981–1982
- Arto Javanainen, 1982–1983
- Tapio Levo, 1983–1989
- Risto Tuomi, 1989–1990
- Tapio Levo, 1990–1992
- Olli Kaski, 1992–1994
- Jokke Heinänen, 1994–1995
- Jari Korpisalo, 1995–1997
- Jari Levonen, 1997–1998
- Pasi Peltonen, 1998–2000
- Jari Korpisalo, 2000–2005
- Pasi Peltonen, 2005–2007
- Matti Kuparinen, 2007–2011
- Ville Uusitalo, 2011–2015
- Juha Kiilholma, 2015–2016
- Matti Kuparinen, 2016–2018
- Tommi Taimi, 2018–2019
- Niklas Appelgren, 2019–2021
- Jarno Kärki, 2021–2022
- Jesse Joensuu, 2022–2024
- Jan-Mikael Järvinen, 2024–

=== Coaches ===
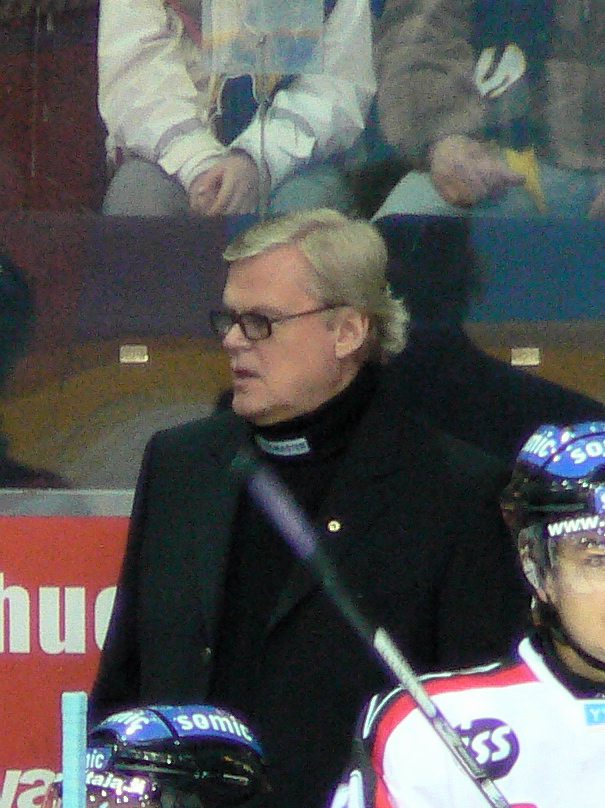
Alpo Suhonen, Ässät's coach from 2007 to 2009

- Rauli Virtanen, 1967–1968
- Lasse Heikkilä, 1968–1974
- Matti Jansson, 1974–1976
- Lasse Heikkilä, 1972–1981
- Antti Heikkilä, 1981–1986
- Tapio Flinck, 1986–1989
- Matti Keinonen, 1989–2 December 1990
- Vasily Tikhonov, 2 December 1990 – 1993
- Veli-Pekka Ketola, 1993–28 September 1996
- Kari Makkonen, 28 September 1996 – 3 October 1996
- Juhani Tamminen, 3 October 1996 – 1998
- Esko Nokelainen, 1998–1999
- Veli-Pekka Ketola, 1999–1999
- Vladimir Jurzinov Jr., 1999–2000
- Ismo Läntinen, 2000–29 September 2000
- Vladimir Jurzinov Jr., 29 September 2000 – 12 October 2001
- Kaj Matalamäki, 12 October 2001 – 2002
- Mika Toivola, 2002–2006
- Juha Pajuoja, 2006–19 November 2006
- Jari Härkälä, 19 November 2006 – 14 November 2007
- Alpo Suhonen, 14 November 2007 – 2009
- Pekka Rautakallio, 2009–2011
- Karri Kivi, 2011–2013
- Pekka Virta, 2013–2014
- Pekka Rautakallio, 2014–11 February 2016
- Mikael Kotkaniemi, 11 February 2016 – 2016
- Jyrki Aho, 2016–14 January 2018
- Mikael Kotkaniemi, 14 January 2018 – 9 November 2018
- Pasi Kaukoranta, 9 November 2018 – 2019
- Ari-Pekka Selin, 2019–23 November 2021
- Karri Kivi, 23 November 2021 – 2023
- Jere Härkälä, 2023–2024
- Jarno Pikkarainen, 2024–present

=== NHL drafted players ===
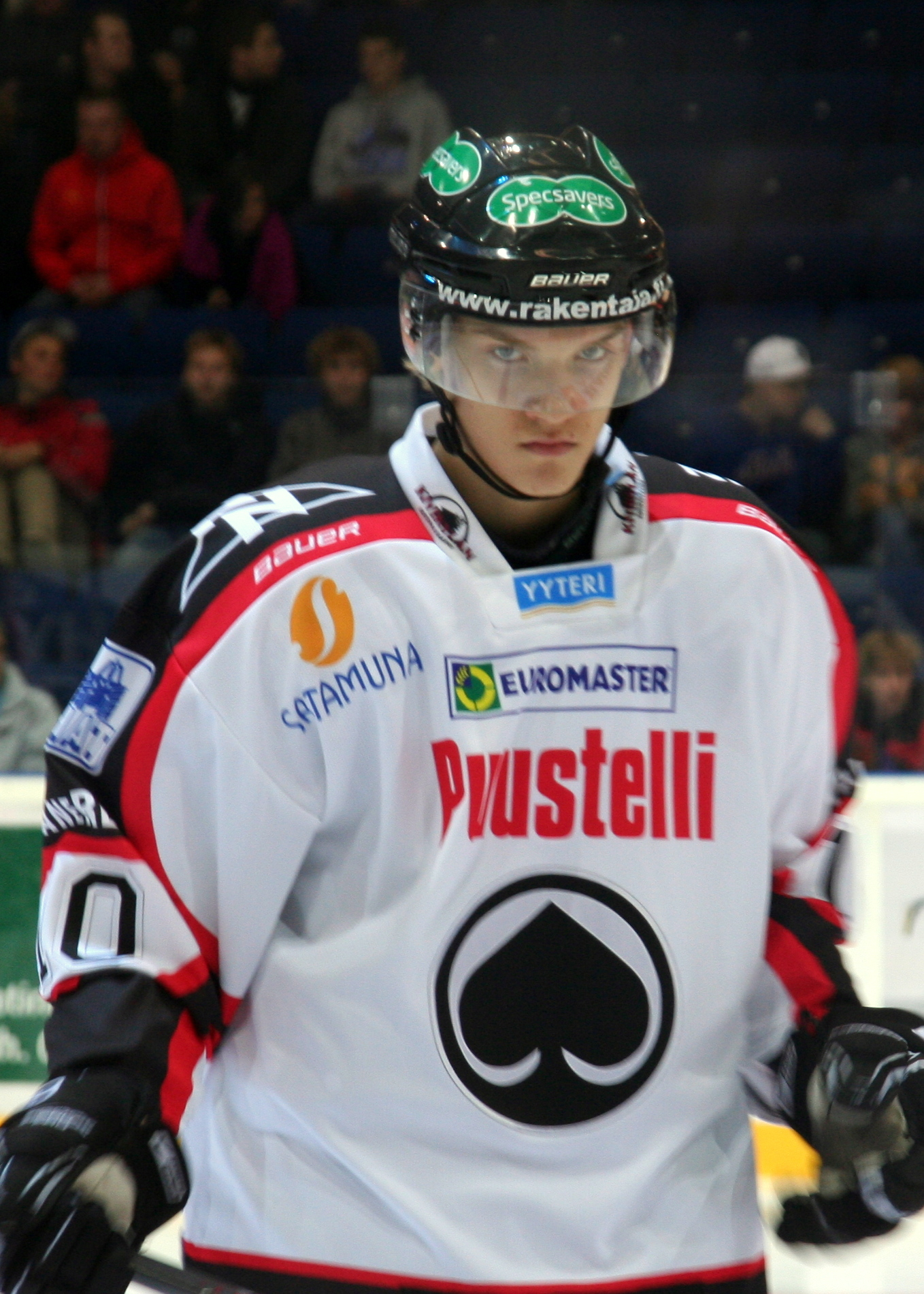
Joel Armia with Ässät in 2010. Armia was drafted 16th overall by the Buffalo Sabres in 2011.

- 1975: Tapio Levo, Kari Makkonen
- 1981: Kari Takko
- 1983: Arto Javanainen, Christian Ruuttu
- 1984: Arto Javanainen, Kari Takko
- 1988: Ari Matilainen
- 1990: Rauli Raitanen
- 1993: Petri Varis
- 1994: Tommi Rajamäki
- 1995: Timo Hakanen
- 1998: Mika Lehto
- 2002: Jarkko Immonen
- 2006: Jesse Joensuu, Leo Komarov
- 2011: Joel Armia
- 2014: Juho Lammikko
- 2015: Aleksi Saarela
- 2018: Jesperi Kotkaniemi, Otto Kivenmäki
- 2019: Antti Tuomisto
- 2020: Roni Hirvonen
- 2021: Aleksi Heimosalmi, Rasmus Korhonen
- 2023: Lenni Hämeenaho

== International campaigns ==
Table of Ässät's performances in major international tournaments, such as the IIHF European Cup.

Bold text indicates Ässät's victory.

Season	Competition	Opponent	Summary	Placement
1967–68	EC	Legia Warzaw	**6–3**	Third round exit
1967–68	EC	Legia Warzaw	**6–2**	Third round exit
1967–68	EC	Vålerenga	**7–2**	Third round exit
1967–68	EC	Vålerenga	**8–3**	Third round exit
1967–68	EC	Dynamo Berlin	0–5	Third round exit
1967–68	EC	Dynamo Berlin	**6–3**	Third round exit
1971–72	EC	Podhale Nowy Targ	0–5 (By forfeit)	—
1978–79	EC	Podhale Nowy Targ	**7–2**	3rd place
1978–79	EC	Poldi Kladno	3–8	3rd place
1978–79	EC	HC CSKA Moscow	3–12	3rd place
1978–79	EC	Skellefteå AIK	**3–2**	3rd place

== Franchise records ==
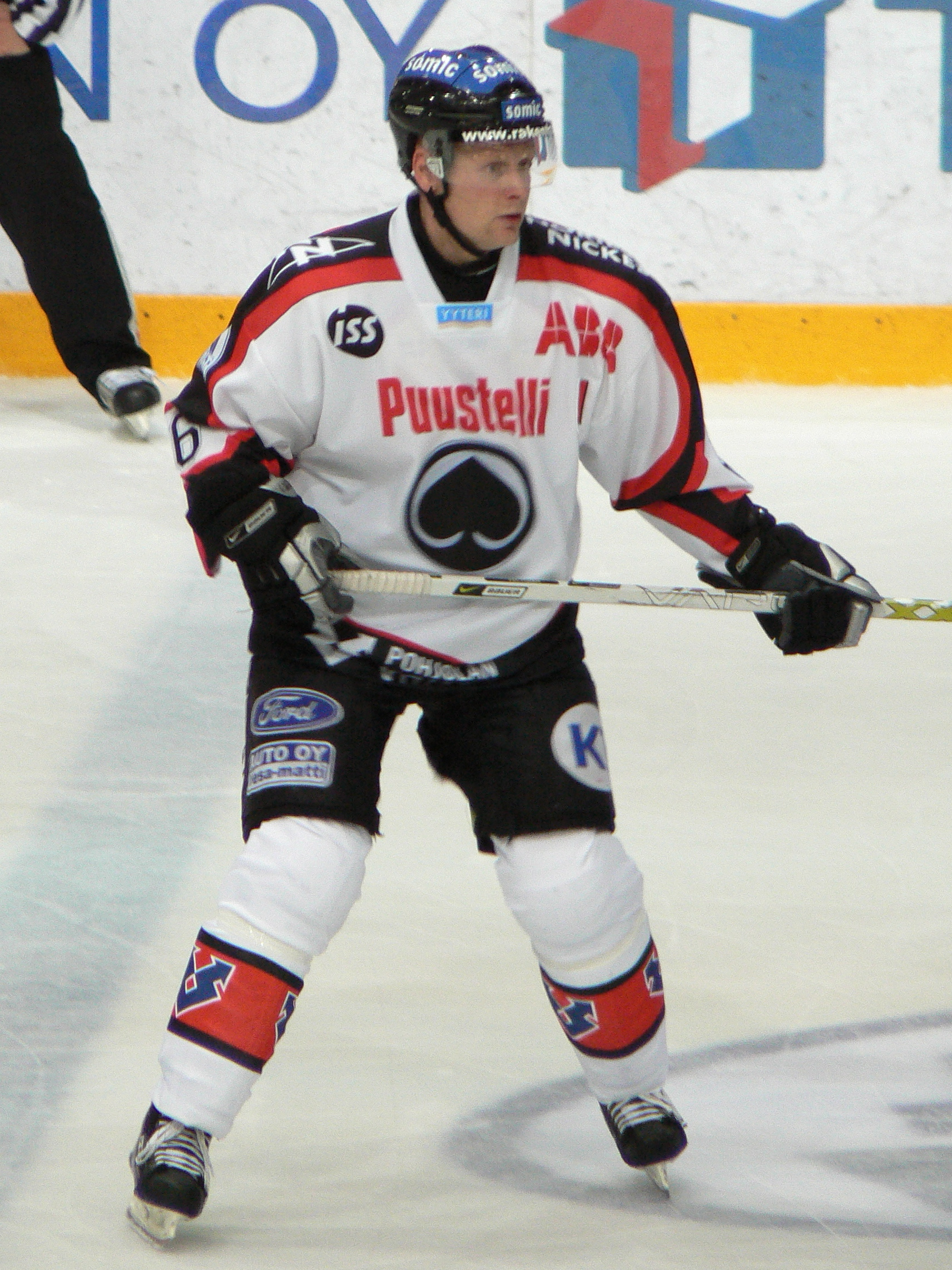
Pasi "Pele" Peltonen, the player with the most games with Ässät in October 2008.

The following list contains statistics about the five highest point-scorers in franchise history in events including playoffs. Figures are updated after each completed season.

- * – current Ässät player

Note: Pos = Position; GP = Games Played; G = Goals; A = Assists; Pts = Points

Points
Player	Pos	GP	G	A	Pts
Arto Javanainen	F	678	472	342	**814**
Kari Makkonen	F	655	336	365	**701**
Tapio Levo	D	680	256	279	**535**
Veli-Pekka Ketola	F	344	225	268	**493**
Jari Korpisalo	F	612	227	242	**469**

Goals
Player	Pos	GP	G
Arto Javanainen	F	678	**472**
Kari Makkonen	F	655	**336**
Tapio Levo	D	680	**256**
Jari Korpisalo	F	612	**227**
Veli-Pekka Ketola	F	344	**225**

Assists
Player	Pos	GP	A
Kari Makkonen	F	655	**365**
Arto Javanainen	F	678	**342**
Tapio Levo	D	680	**279**
Veli-Pekka Ketola	F	344	**268**
Marko Kivenmäki	F	479	**244**

Games played
Player	Pos	GP
Pasi Peltonen	D	876
Harry Nikander	D	688
Tapio Levo	D	680
Arto Javanainen	F	678
Kari Makkonen	F	655

Sources: "Elite Prospects – Ässät franchise records".

== Home arena ==
=== Home arena ===
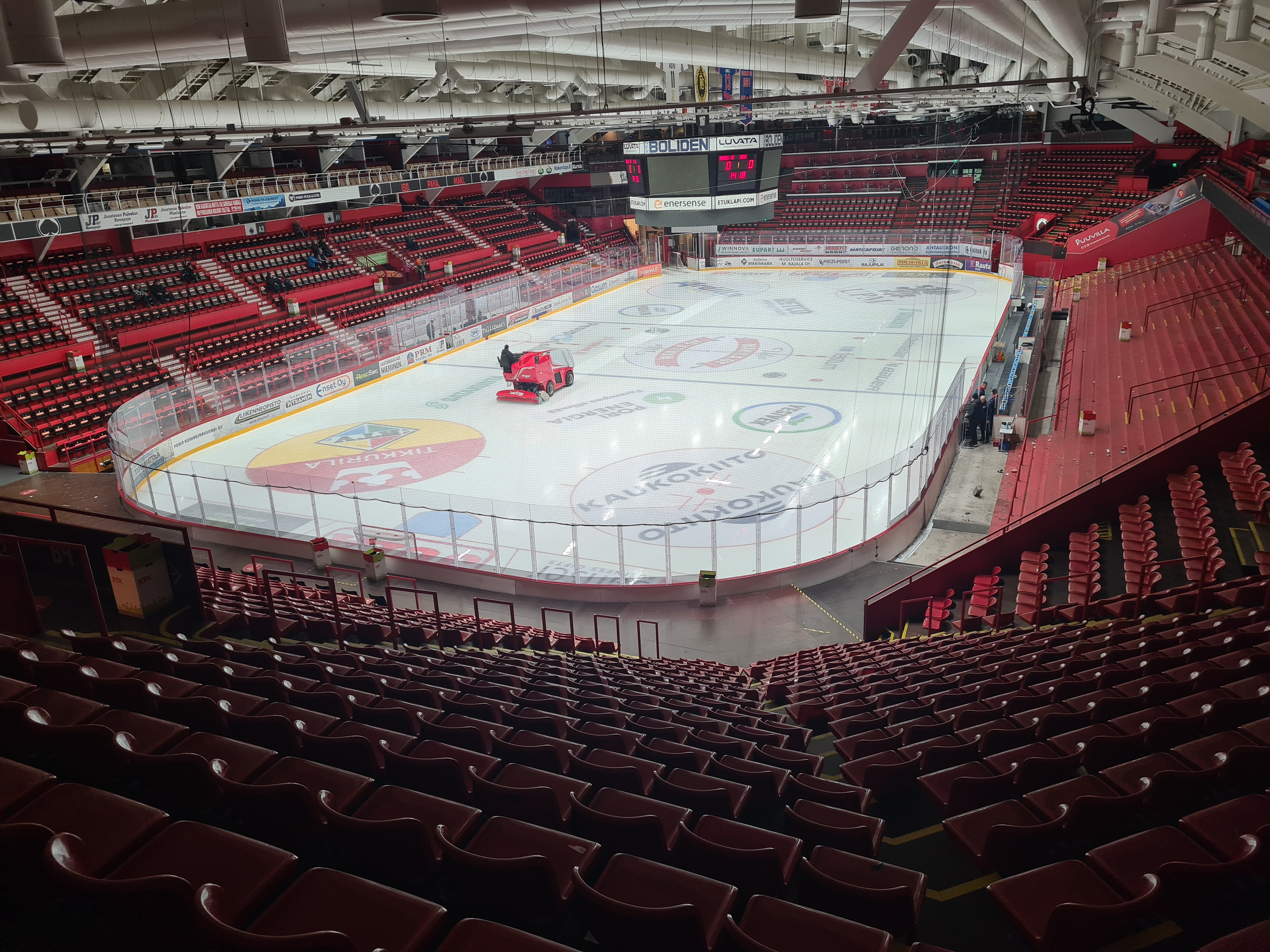
Isomäki Ice Hall's ice rink from the inside.

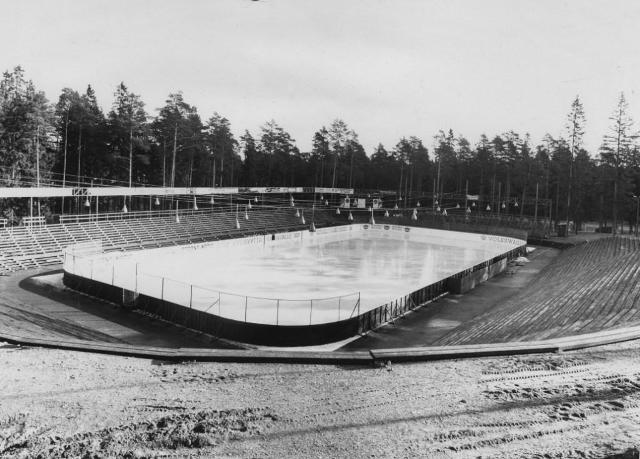
Isomäki ice rink in 1964

The Isomäki Ice Hall (Finnish: Isomäen jäähalli) was opened in 1964 as an outdoor artificial ice rink. The arena was finished in 1971 with a capacity of 8,000 spectators. As of 2023, the spectator capacity is 6,150.

Currently, the Isomäki Ice Hall is known for its closed atmosphere and reputation as a difficult arena for away teams. The arena is located in the Pori sporting center in the Isomäki district. It was last renovated between 2014 and 2016; during this time period, its name was officially changed to Isomäki Areena. The current audience capacity of the arena ranges from 6,150 to 6,500 spectators. As of 9 September 2023, the arena was known by sponsor name, Enersense Areena.

In 2023 after a successful season, the arena got a new jumbotron and new sound technology – increasing the amount of speakers from ten to 130. Isomäki also got more LED screens. The jumbotron was reported to have the best image quality in all of Finland.

=== Training facilities ===
Ässät mainly practises in the Isomäki Ice Hall, but also uses the Astora Areena, which was constructed in 2011. Astora Areena is owned by Porin Ässät ry and is used by all Ässät junior teams.

== Women's team ==
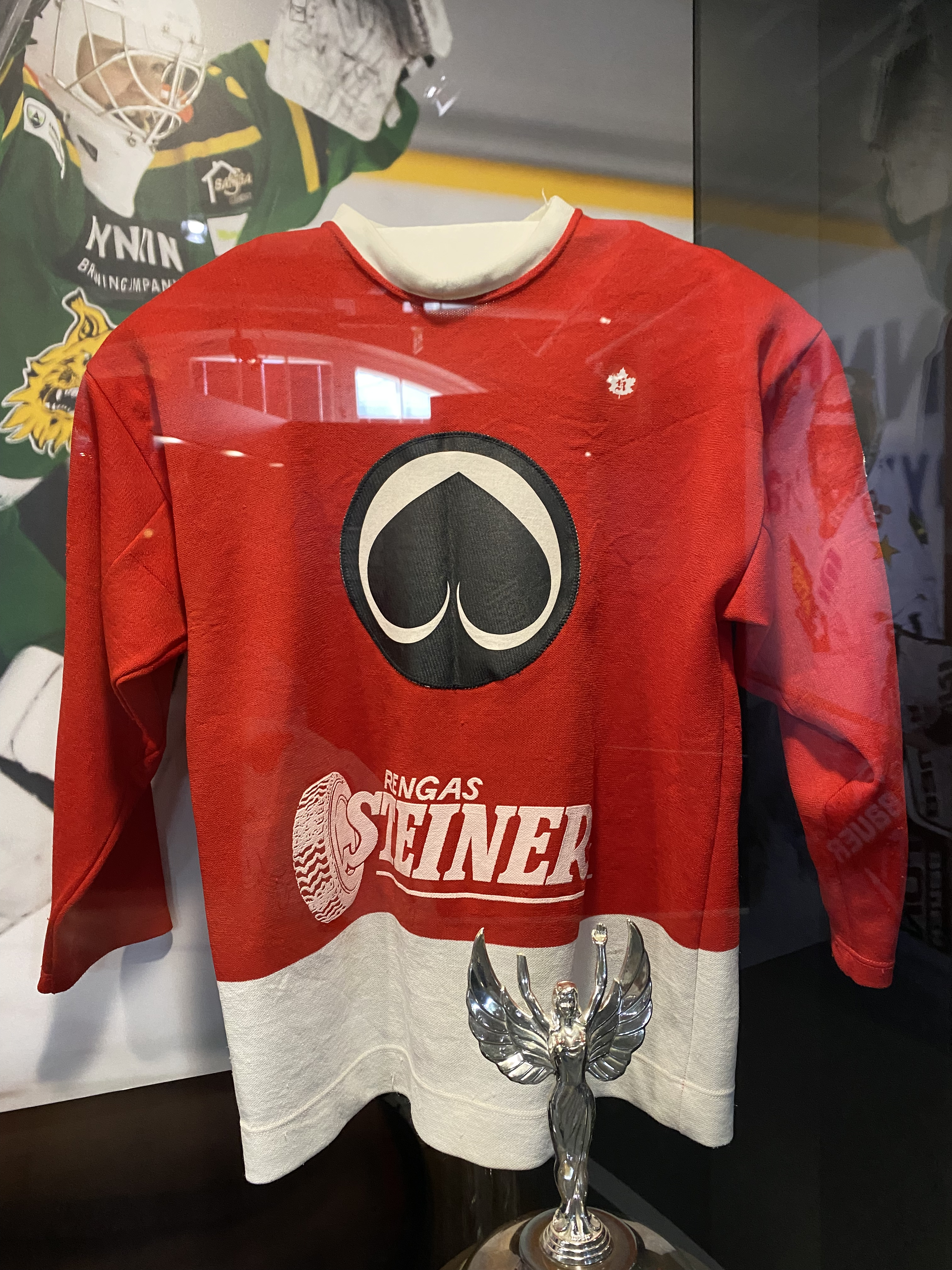
Ässät women's jersey used by Tiina Paasikunnas

Ässät has had a women's representative team in 1982–95 and 1999–2003. Ässät was one of the ten founders of the Naisten SM-sarja (now Naisten Liiga). Arguably the best female player to come out of the Ässät junior department after the collapse of the senior team is Sofianna Sundelin, Olympic and World Championship bronze medallist who currently plays for St. Cloud State Huskies in the NCAA Division I.

Notable Ässät alumni include Sari Fisk and Anne Haanpää. Former Ässät player Tatyana Tsaryova is also a World Championship bronze medallist.

=== Team records ===
These are the top-five-point-scorers in franchise history. Figures are updated after each completed season.

- * – current Ässät player

Note: Pos = Position; GP = Games Played; G = Goals; A = Assists; Pts = Points

Points
Player	Pos	GP	G	A	Pts
Sari Marjamäki	F	107	82	47	**121**
Katri Javanainen	F	100	71	38	**109**
Sanna Sainio	F	96	51	32	**83**
Sanna Kanerva	F	87	56	25	**81**
Anne Haanpää	D	21	52	21	**73**

== See also ==
- Porin Ässät
- Porin Ässät (men's football)
- Pata (esports)
- History of Porin Ässät (men's ice hockey)
