= Rauli Virtanen =

Finnish media professional (born 1948)

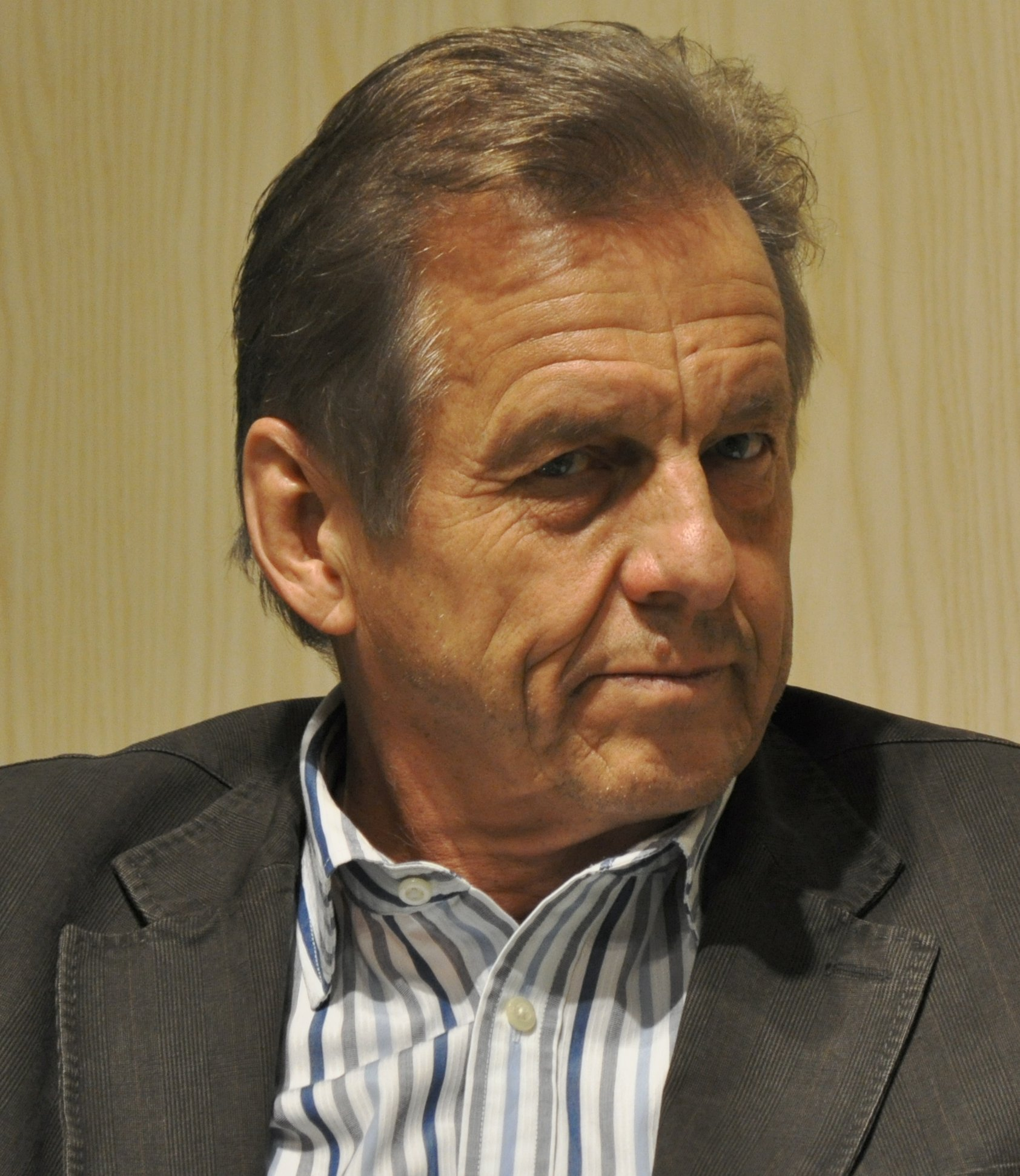
Rauli Virtanen in 2009

Rauli Virtanen (born 28 June 1948) is a Finnish writer, freelance journalist, lecturer and television producer. He has covered wars and conflicts since the days of Vietnam War, and may be the first person to have visited all the countries in the world (170 in 1988). He has been a foreign correspondent based in New York and London and a roving correspondent based in Finland.

Virtanen has worked for all the major Finnish print and electronic media, and his articles have also been published in the foreign media.

He has written eight non-fiction books.

From 2015 to 2016, Virtanen was the visiting professor of journalism at the University of Tampere.

Virtanen has been putting together various photo exhibitions in Finland and overseas (Thailand, United States, Abu Dhabi, Malaysia) from his travels.

== Awards ==
Virtanen is the recipient of many recognitions and top journalism awards in Finland:

- State Award for Public Information (Finnish: tiedonjulkistamisen valtionpalkinto) by the Finnish Ministry of Education and Culture
- Suomen Kuvalehden journalistipalkinto (lit. 'Suomen Kuvalehti's journalist award')
- Inhimillinen kädenojennus -tunnustus ('humane hand extension recognition') by the Finnish Red Cross
- Urho Kekkosen 70-vuotisjuhlasäätiön palkinto ('Urho Kekkonen's 70th anniversary foundation's award')
- Sotilasansiomitali ('military merit medal') by the Finnish Chief of Defence
- Alfred Kordelin -palkinto ('Alfred Kordelin award')
- Lifetime Achievement Golden Venla Award
- Suomen Kristillisen Rauhanliikkeen Rauhanpalkinto 2026.
