= Lasse Heikkilä =

Finnish ice hockey player and coach

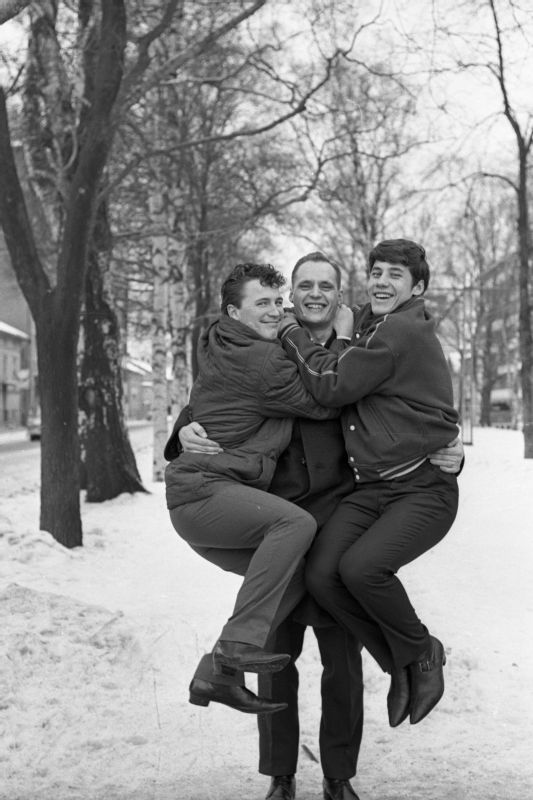
- Lasse Heikkilä (left), Esa Wesslin and Veli-Pekka Ketola
- Born: May 27, 1934 (age 91) Pori, Finland
- Position: Defence
- Played for: Porin Karhut
- Coached for: Porin Ässät
- Playing career: 1961–1965

Lasse Heikkilä (born May 27, 1934) is a retired professional ice hockey player and coach as well as football player. Heikkilä played for the Porin Karhut in the SM-sarja and coached the Porin Ässät in the SM-liiga. In football, Heikkilä represented the Porin Karhut and TPS Turku.

Heikkilä's number 13 is retired by the Porin Karhut and is a Finnish Hockey Hall of Fame inductee. Heikkilä's brother, Antti, also played for Ässät and the Karhut.

== Coaching career ==
After his playing career, Heikkilä started coaching the Karhut in 1965 and continued in the new club formed in 1967, the Porin Ässät. He served as the club's coach until 1981. After that he served as Ässät's general manager until 1994.

In February 2015, Ässät honored the 50th anniversary of the Karhut 1965 championship by playing a match against Ilves in Karhut jerseys and retiring Heikkilä's number 13 in Karhut colours.

Preceded by Seppo Liitsola	Finnish national ice hockey team coach 1976–1977	Succeeded by Kalevi Numminen
