= Raimo Kilpiö =

Finnish ice hockey player

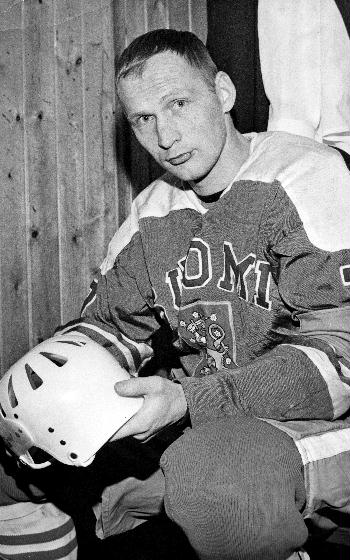
- Raimo Kilpiö circa 1960s
- Born: 2 February 1936 (age 89) Parikkala, Finland
- Height: 176 cm (5 ft 9 in)
- Weight: 74 kg (163 lb; 11 st 9 lb)
- Position: Centre
- Shot: Right
- Played for: Ilves; Rosenlewin Urheilijat-38; Porin Ässät
- National team: Finland
- Playing career: 1953–1977

Raimo Olavi Kilpiö (born 2 February 1936 in Parikkala, Finland) is a retired professional ice hockey player who played 459 games in the SM-liiga and its predecessor SM-sarja from 1953 to 1977. During his career, he scored 261 goals and 492 points. He played for Ilves, RU-38, and Ässät. He is a six-time Finnish Champion and once won the bronze medal. He competed at the 1960 Winter Olympics and the 1964 Winter Olympics.

He was inducted into the Finnish Hockey Hall of Fame in 1985.

== Career ==
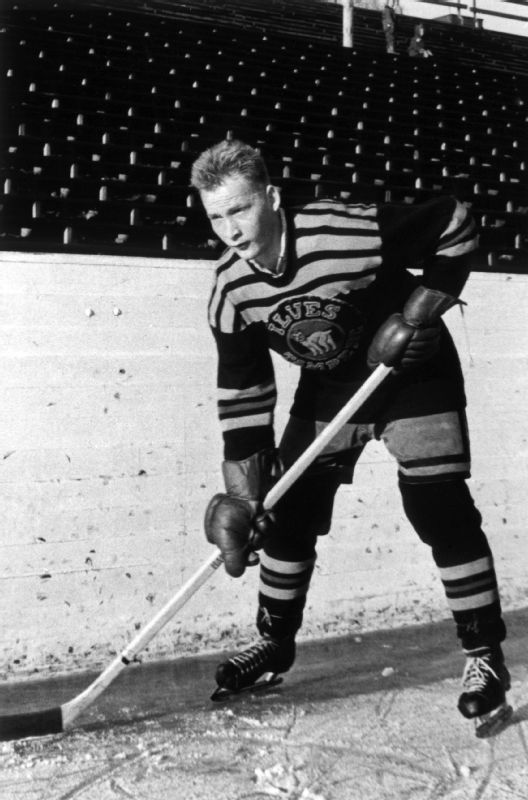
Raimo Kilpiö with Ilves

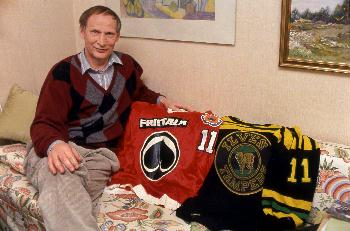
Raimo Kilpiö, Ässät's first captain, with an Ässät and Ilves jersey in 1990

Kilpiö made his SM-sarja debut with Ilves during the 1953–54 season.

Kilpiö was one of the best forward stars of his time. Among other things, he was chosen four times as the best forward in the SM-sarja. Kilpiö won the Finnish championship six times, the first four of which came with Ilves, one in RU-38 and one in Ässät. In SM-sarja and SM-liiga, Kilpiö scored 492 points in 459 matches.

In football, Kilpiö won the silver medal in the national championship with TaPa in 1962. In the same year, he also played one B national match. In 1956, Kilpiö won the A-junior district championship in TaPa's team, which also featured footballer Matti Mäkelä and Kilpiö's teammate from Ilves, Räshid Hakimsan.

Today, the SM-liiga annually awards the Raimo Kilpiö trophy, which is given to the league's gentleman player of the year.

Ässät have retired Kilpiö's number 11. The jersey has been raised to the rafters of the Isomäki Areena in the colors of RU-38.
