= Porin Ässät =

Finnish sports club

- Sport: Ice hockey, formerly association football and esports
- Founded: June 1967; 59 years ago
- League: SM-liiga
- Based in: Pori, Finland
- Arena: Isomäki Ice Hall
- Stadium: Pori Stadium (Football, 1967–1981)
- Colours: Red, black, white, gold
- Mascot: Rysty Mesikämmen
- Official fan club: Pataljoona, Karhunkämmen
- Local media: Satakunnan Kansa; Radio Pori
- Website: www.porinassat.fi

Porin Ässät ry is a sports club based in Pori, Finland. The club's only programs are ice hockey and esports, but it used to have an association football program. Porin Ässät ry operates an ice hockey team in the Finnish Elite League. Porin Ässät ry also has junior teams for all age groups from U7 to U20. Porin Ässät ry also operate a women's ice hockey school and the girl's junior ice hockey department while also operating a skating school.

== Sports ==
=== Men's ice hockey ===
Ässät's ice hockey department started in 1967 when two local clubs, RU-38 and Karhut, merged. Since 1967, Ässät has won three Finnish Championships (1971, 1978 and 2013) and one Finnish Cup (Suomen Cup in Finnish) For the 2023–24 season, Ässät plays in the Liiga, the top-tier of ice hockey in Finland.

Ässät women's ice hockey department was established in 1981 and it was one of the ten teams that formed the Naisten SM-sarja (now Naisten Liiga). The team was disestablished in 2003, but was re-established as an ice hockey school in 2020.

=== Men's football ===
Ässät men's football section was formed in 1967. Ässät inherited RU-38's place in the Mestaruussarja, where they played for two seasons before being relegated. The football club folded in 1981.

Ässät managed to win one A-junior championship in 1970.

=== Esports ===
The Pata Ässät esports team was founded in 2017, when Ässät picked up players of a team called REAKT. The team started with playing Overwatch and Counter Strike Global Offensive but dropped them and moved on to NHL video game series. PATA has not been active since 2022 when the eLiiga season ended in a 6th place.

PATA has played in the Finnish Esports League and the ESEA League.

The Liiga playoffs were played in the NHL 20 video game due to the COVID-19 pandemic. PATA's player was an ex-hockey player Iiro Vehmanen. PATA beat JYP in the first round, but lost on the second round to Kärpät. Ässät finished 10th in the eLiiga 2020 regular season, and thus did not make it to the playoffs. The games were played in NHL 21. In the 2021–22 eLiiga season, Ässät finished 4th in the regular season tied with Tappara with 51 points, so it made it into the playoffs. Ässät got eliminated by Tappara in the first round in two games. The games were played in NHL 22.

== Other operations ==
=== HC Ässät Pori Oy ===
HC Ässät Pori Oy
- Founded: 2000; 26 years ago
- Owner: Porin Ässät ry (75.6%)
- Subsidiaries: HC Ässät; HC Ässät U20
- Website: assat.com

HC Ässät Pori Oy was made into a separate organization from Porin Ässät ry in 2000. Porin Ässät ry owns 75.6% of HC Ässät Pori Oy. HC Ässät Pori Oy owns the Porin Ässät men's ice hockey team and the Porin Ässät U20 team. HC Ässät Pori Oy previously owned parts of the Isomäki Ice Hall, an ice hockey arena in Pori, but sold it to the City of Pori because of financial troubles.

=== Shots restaurant ===
The Porin Ässät operates a restaurant and café called Shots.

=== Patajunnuareena Oy ===
Patajunnuareena Oy is a company that Porin Ässät ry owns. Patajunnuareena Oy was founded in 2007 for the building and upkeeping of the Astora Areena, an ice hockey arena located next to the Isomäki Ice Hall.

=== Pata Production Oy ===
Pata Productions Oy is a company owned by Porin Ässät ry. Its purpose is to support Ässät's ice hockey junior teams. Pata Production Oy rents metal fence elements to event organizers of different sizes. In addition, the company rents metallic ladder elements. The money the company produces goes towards the junior teams. Pata Production Oy was founded in 2012.
