= 2023–24 Swiss League season =

- League: Swiss League
- Sport: Ice hockey
- Duration: September 15, 2023 – February 2, 2024
- Games: 225
- Teams: 10

Regular Season
- Season Champions: HC La Chaux-de-Fonds
- Top scorer: Jakob Stukel

Playoffs

Swiss League champion
- Champions: HC La Chaux-de-Fonds
- Runners-up: GCK Lions

Swiss League seasons
- ← 2022–23 2024–25 →

The 2023–24 Swiss League season was the 77th season of Switzerland's second tier hockey league.

== Teams ==
Swiss League teams for the 2023–24 season

Team	City	Arena	Capacity
EHC Basel	Basel	St. Jakob Arena	6,700
HC La Chaux-de-Fonds	La Chaux-de-Fonds	Patinoire des Mélèzes	5,800
GCK Lions	Küsnacht	Eishalle Küsnacht	2,200
HCV Martigny	Martigny	Forum d'Octodure	3,500
EHC Olten	Olten	Kleinholz Stadion	6,500
HC Sierre	Sierre	Patinoire de Graben	4,500
HC Thurgau	Weinfelden	Güttingersreuti	3,100
HCB Ticino Rockets	Bellinzona	Centro Sportivo	2,180
EHC Visp	Visp	Lonza Arena	5,500
EHC Winterthur	Winterthur	Zielbau Arena	3,000

== Regular season ==
The regular season started on 15 September 2023 and ended on 2 February 2024.

Pos	Team	Pld	W	OTW	OTL	L	GF	GA	GD	Pts	Qualification
1	HC La Chaux-de-Fonds	45	26	3	8	8	157	103	+54	92	Advance to Playoffs
2	EHC Basel	45	29	2	1	13	178	111	+67	92	Advance to Playoffs
3	EHC Olten	45	23	5	5	12	160	117	+43	84	Advance to Playoffs
4	GCK Lions	45	21	6	2	16	143	120	+23	77	Advance to Playoffs
5	HC Sierre	45	16	6	3	20	128	148	−20	63	Advance to Playoffs
6	Hockey Thurgau	45	16	4	7	18	120	115	+5	63	Advance to Playoffs
7	EHC Visp	45	17	3	4	21	103	113	−10	61	Advance to Playoffs
8	EHC Winterthur	45	13	8	5	19	119	135	−16	60	Advance to Playoffs
9	HCV Martigny	45	15	5	3	22	121	148	−27	58	
10	HCB Ticino Rockets	45	6	1	5	33	73	192	−119	25	

Source: Swiss League
Rules for classification: 1) points; 2) a higher number of wins in the regular time; 3) a higher number of wins in overtime and shootouts; 4) goal difference; 5) number of goals scored; 6) drawing of lots.

=== Statistics ===
==== Scoring leaders ====
The following shows the top ten players who led the league in points, at the conclusion of the regular season. If two or more skaters are tied (i.e. same number of points, goals and played games), all of the tied skaters are shown.

Player	Team	GP	G	A	Pts	+/–	PIM
(Canada) Jakob Stukel	EHC Basel	38	28	25	53	+31	14
(Switzerland) Léonardo Fuhrer	HCV Martigny	38	27	20	47	+8	26
(Latvia) Toms Andersons	HC La Chaux-de-Fonds	38	16	28	44	+11	8
(Canada) Éric Faille	EHC Olten	33	8	36	44	+19	14
(Canada) Josh Lawrence	EHC Winterthur	39	21	22	43	-8	20
(United States) Brett Supinski	EHC Basel	36	10	31	41	+33	12
(Canada) François Beauchemin	EHC Olten	38	26	14	40	+15	28
(France) Jordann Bougro	HC Sierre	37	18	21	39	+7	10
(Switzerland) Arnaud Montandon	HC Sierre	38	13	26	39	+2	24
(Sweden) David Lindquist	HCV Martigny	36	6	33	39	0	14

==== Leading goaltenders ====
The following shows the top five goaltenders who led the league in goals against average, provided that they have played at least 40% of their team's minutes, at the conclusion of the regular season.

Player	Team(s)	GP	TOI	GA	Sv%	GAA
(Switzerland) Luis Janett	HC Thurgau	23	1376:02	45	94.13	1.96
(Switzerland) Fabio Haller	EHC Basel	19	1104:02	37	93.01	2.01
(Sweden) Viktor Östlund	HC La Chaux-de-Fonds	30	1761:11	62	91.48	2.11
(Switzerland) Dominic Nyffeler	EHC Olten	22	1255:30	48	92.14	2.29
(Switzerland) Andri Henauer	EHC Basel	21	1176:17	45	91.94	2.30

== Playoffs ==
=== Bracket ===
Quarter-Finals
1	HC La Chaux-de-Fonds	4
8	EHC Winterthur	1
2	EHC Basel	2
7	EHC Visp	4
(Pairings are reseeded after the first round)
3	EHC Olten	4
6	Hockey Thurgau	2
4	GCK Lions	4
5	HC Sierre	2

Semi-Finals
1	HC La Chaux-de-Fonds	4
7	EHC Visp	0
3	EHC Olten	3
4	GCK Lions	4

Finals
1	HC La Chaux-de-Fonds	4
4	GCK Lions	1

=== Quarter-Finals ===
==== (1) HC La Chaux-de-Fonds vs. (8) EHC Winterthur ====
13 February	HC La Chaux-de-Fonds	4-1	EHC Winterthur	Patinoire des Mélèzes, La Chaux-de-Fonds	Recap
Vogel (McShane, Matewa) - 6:00; Privet (Andersons, Olden) (PP1) - 19:09		First period	7:15 - Hornecker (Lawrence)
No scoring		Second period	No scoring
Kohler (Stoffel, Macquat) - 49:18; McShane (Olden, Matewa) - 56:57		Third period	No scoring
Viktor Östlund ( 24 saves / 25 shots )		Goalie stats	Michal Chmel ( 31 saves / 35 shots )

16 February	EHC Winterthur	4-2	HC La Chaux-de-Fonds	Zielbau Arena, Winterthur	Recap
13:54 - Muller (Forget, Antenen); 18:28 - Lekic (Betschmann, Ugazzi)		First period	No scoring
24:01 - Antenen (Betschmann, Staiger) (PP1); 29:52 - Ogi (Ugazzi, Koster)		Second period	No scoring
No scoring		Third period	Privet (Rüegsegger, Nussbaumer) - 41:32; Macquat (Pouilly, Stoffel) - 46:39
Michal Chmel ( 36 saves / 38 shots )		Goalie stats	Viktor Östlund ( 21 saves / 25 shots ) Hugo Cerviño ( 0 saves / 0 shots )

18 February	HC La Chaux-de-Fonds	8-0	EHC Winterthur	Patinoire des Mélèzes, La Chaux-de-Fonds	Recap
Huguenin (Šmons, Reichle) - 3:23; Olden (Andersons, Östlund) - 8:08		First period	No scoring
Loosli - 20:31; McShane (Andersons, Huguenin) (PP2) - 32:09; Kohler (McShane, Macquat) (PP1) - 33:30		Second period	No scoring
Loosli (Jaquet, Huguenin) - 45:47; McShane (Huguenin, Jaquet) - 47:51; Huguenin (Kohler) - 56:52		Third period	No scoring
Viktor Östlund ( 15 saves / 15 shots )		Goalie stats	Michal Chmel ( 21 saves / 25 shots ) Damian Stettler ( 20 saves / 24 shots )

20 February	EHC Winterthur	0-5 (forfeit)	HC La Chaux-de-Fonds	Zielbau Arena, Winterthur	Recap

23 February	HC La Chaux-de-Fonds	3-2	OT	EHC Winterthur	Patinoire des Mélèzes, La Chaux-de-Fonds	Recap
No scoring		First period		No scoring
Loosli (Privet, Matewa) - 31:09		Second period		38:57 - Valenza (Antenen, Betschmann)
Andersons (Olden, Huguenin) - 49:22		Third period		42:33 - Kobel (Ogi, Ren)
Kohler (Macquat, Schweri) - 75:18		First overtime period		No scoring
Viktor Östlund ( 25 saves / 27 shots )		Goalie stats		Michal Chmel ( 71 saves / 74 shots )

HC La Chaux-de-Fonds won the series 4–1

==== (2) EHC Basel vs. (7) EHC Visp ====
13 February	EHC Basel	1-2	EHC Visp	St. Jakob Arena, Basel	Recap
No scoring		First period	5:50 - Burgener (Pinana, Ritz); 13:42 - Haussener (Nilsson, Grossniklaus)
Stukel (Bircher, Ryser) - 25:18		Second period	No scoring
No scoring		Third period	No scoring
Andri Henauer ( 14 saves / 16 shots )		Goalie stats	Stefan Müller ( 39 saves / 40 shots )

16 February	EHC Visp	4-3	EHC Basel	Lonza Arena, Visp	Recap
No scoring		First period	8:49 - Hüsler (Nater, Liniger)
Chiriaev (Gähler, Kuonen) - 28:02; Chiriaev (Pinana, Mäder) - 33:45; Gähler (Riatsch, Eigenmann) - 35:24		Second period	20:22 - Supinski; 27:35 - Bircher (Näf, Sturny)
Burgener (Riatsch, Brüschweiler) - 57:59		Third period	No scoring
Stefan Müller ( 31 saves / 34 shots )		Goalie stats	Andri Henauer ( 21 saves / 25 shots )

18 February	EHC Basel	2-3	EHC Visp	St. Jakob Arena, Basel	Recap
Supinski (Fuss, Stukel) - 11:05		First period	No scoring
No scoring		Second period	28:29 - Burgener (Riatsch, Ritz); 29:11 - Nunn (Brüschweiler, Nilsson)
Hüsler (Rouiller, Rexha) - 47:30		Third period	56:09 - Haussener (Canova, Wüest)
Fabio Haller ( 30 saves / 33 shots )		Goalie stats	Stefan Müller ( 43 saves / 45 shots )

20 February	EHC Visp	2-7	EHC Basel	Lonza Arena, Visp	Recap
5:30 - Riatsch (Chiriaev); 6:00 - Burgener (Nunn, Ritz)		First period	Aeschbach (Kummer, Bachofner) - 17:11; Nater (Ryser, Rexha) - 18:22; Aeschbach (Sturny, Fuss) - 19:27
No scoring		Second period	Stukel (Aeschbach, Kummer) (PP1) - 25:45; Stukel (Nater) - 33:01
No scoring		Third period	Supinski - 43:15; Hüsler (Bircher) (SH1) - 45:05
Stefan Müller ( 29 saves / 36 shots )		Goalie stats	Andri Henauer ( 0 saves / 2 shots ) Fabio Haller ( 23 saves / 23 shots )

23 February	EHC Basel	6-2	EHC Visp	St. Jakob Arena, Basel	Recap
Brügger (Huber, Füllemann) - 18:10		First period	No scoring
Supinski (Stukel) - 28:51; Kummer (Rouiller, Brügger) (PP1) - 36:42		Second period	31:50 - Chiriaev (Gähler, Eigenmann)
Kummer (Stukel, Aeschbach) (PP1) - 48:11; Aeschbach (Kummer) - 56:03; Huber - 59:38		Third period	56:46 - Chiriaev (Eigenmann, Gähler)
Fabio Haller ( 16 saves / 18 shots )		Goalie stats	Stefan Müller ( 33 saves / 39 shots )

25 February	EHC Visp	5-4	OT	EHC Basel	Lonza Arena, Visp	Recap
9:57 - Nunn (Lindquist, Burgener); 18:29 - Burgener (Eigenmann, Lindquist)		First period		Fuss (Stukel) - 16:24
32:12 - Eigenmann (Gähler, Canova); 38:12 - Mäder (Chiriaev, Eigenmann)		Second period		Stukel (PP1) - 26:21; Küng - 38:53
No scoring		Third period		Stukel (Aeschbach) (SH1) - 54:17
69:14 - Nunn (Eigenmann) (PP1)		First overtime period		No scoring
Stefan Müller ( 28 saves / 32 shots )		Goalie stats		Fabio Haller ( 29 saves / 34 shots )

EHC Visp won the series 4–2

==== (3) EHC Olten vs. (6) HC Thurgau ====
13 February	EHC Olten	6-1	HC Thurgau	Kleinholz Stadion, Olten	Recap
Spiller (Wyss, Ganz) - 16:24		First period	0:37 - Bengtsson (Hobi, Kellenberger)
Knellwolf (Melnalksnis, Burger) - 29:44; Spiller (Öjdemark) - 35:08		Second period	No scoring
Antonietti (Selin, Elsener) - 47:52; Sterchi (Spiller, Schmuckli) - 51:32; Knellwolf (De Nisco, Melnalksnis) - 58:32		Third period	No scoring
Dominic Nyffeler ( 23 saves / 24 shots )		Goalie stats	Luis Janett ( 30 saves / 36 shots )

16 February	HC Thurgau	3-2	EHC Olten	Güttingersreuti, Weinfelden	Recap
15:16 - Lehmann (Stehli, Garlent)		First period	Tufto (Selin, Horanský) - 1:15
32:22 - Bengtsson (Schnetzer, Villa)		Second period	Elsener (Burger, Ness) - 39:14
53:05 - Hobi (Bengtsson, Etter)		Third period	No scoring
Loic Galley ( 38 saves / 40 shots )		Goalie stats	Dominic Nyffeler ( 22 saves / 25 shots )

18 February	EHC Olten	4-3	OT	HC Thurgau	Kleinholz Stadion, Olten	Recap
No scoring		First period		13:15 - Lehmann (Garlent, Kühni); 15:30 - Stehli (Lehmann)
Tufto (Horanský) - 30:04		Second period		31:02 - Garlent (Lehmann)
Beauchemin (Horanský, Tufto) - 40:43; Antonietti (Horanský, Tufto) - 56:12		Third period		No scoring
Spiller (PP1, PS) - 67:39		First overtime period		No scoring
Dominic Nyffeler ( 17 saves / 20 shots )		Goalie stats		Loic Galley ( 41 saves / 45 shots )

20 February	HC Thurgau	2-1	EHC Olten	Güttingersreuti, Weinfelden	Recap
No scoring		First period	No scoring
No scoring		Second period	D. Weder (Hächler, Spiller) - 21:15
47:39 - Villa (Garlent, Stehli) (PP1); 57:14 - Hollenstein (Kühni, Kellenberger)		Third period	No scoring
Luis Janett ( 33 saves / 34 shots )		Goalie stats	Lucas Rötheli ( 22 saves / 24 shots )

23 February	EHC Olten	8-0	HC Thurgau	Kleinholz Stadion, Olten	Recap
Řehák (Hächler, Ness) (SH1) - 15:36; Horanský (Tufto, Antonietti) - 16:59		First period	No scoring
Sterchi (Beauchemin, Tufto) - 24:23; D. Weder (Spiller, Öjdemark) (PP1) - 26:03; Spiller (D. Weder, Jabola Prada) (PP1) - 30:31; Antonietti (Tufto, Horanský) - 35:51		Second period	No scoring
Spiller (Wyss, Öjdemark) (PP2) - 52:59; Sterchi (D. Weder, Spiller) (PP1) - 56:10		Third period	No scoring
Dominic Nyffeler ( 12 saves / 12 shots )		Goalie stats	Luis Janett ( 14 saves / 18 shots ) Loic Galley ( 12 saves / 16 shots )

25 February	HC Thurgau	0-3	EHC Olten	Güttingersreuti, Weinfelden	Recap
No scoring		First period	No scoring
No scoring		Second period	Beauchemin (Antonietti, Horanský) - 38:07
No scoring		Third period	Ganz (Řehák, Tufto) (PP1) - 43:55; De Nisco (Řehák, Ganz) (EN) - 58:53
Luis Janett ( 26 saves / 28 shots )		Goalie stats	Dominic Nyffeler ( 31 saves / 31 shots )

EHC Olten won the series 4–2

==== (4) GCK Lions vs. (5) HC Sierre ====
13 February	GCK Lions	7-5	HC Sierre	Eishalle Küsnacht, Küsnacht	Recap
No scoring		First period	No scoring
Kärki (Murer) - 29:50; Spring (Baechler, Böhler) - 35:09; Leone (Mettler, Blaser) - 36:29		Second period	24:34 - Maret (M. Montandon, Castonguay); 27:08 - Volejníček (Bougro, Emmerton)
Graf (Henry, Backman) - 44:05; Mettler (Kärki, Leone) - 48:19; Leone (Blaser) (EN) - 58:10; Baechler (Blaser, Ruppelt) (EN) - 59:33		Third period	43:22 - Castonguay (M. Montandon, A. Montandon) (PP1); 46:15 - Volejníček (Y. Berthoud, Lhoták) (PP1); 58:47 - Lhoták (Bougro, Emmerton)
Sascha Ruppelt ( 37 saves / 42 shots )		Goalie stats	Remo Giovannini ( 37 saves / 42 shots )

16 February	HC Sierre	6-3	GCK Lions	Patinoire de Graben, Sierre	Recap
No scoring		First period	No scoring
No scoring		Second period	No scoring
42:22 - Castonguay (Lhoták); 55:13 - Vouillamoz (Bougro, Emmerton); 55:32 - Lhoták (A. Montandon, Åhlström); 57:21 - A. Montandon (Emmerton, M. Montandon) (PP2); 58:23 - A. Montandon (Emmerton, Castonguay) (PP2); 59:41 - Lhoták (Volejníček, A. Montandon) (EN)		Third period	Graf (Backman) - 40:57; Mettler (Leone, Kärki) - 48:21; Backman (Kärki, Blaser) (PP1) - 50:29
Remo Giovannini ( 32 saves / 35 shots )		Goalie stats	Sascha Ruppelt ( 25 saves / 30 shots )

18 February	GCK Lions	2-4	HC Sierre	Eishalle Küsnacht, Küsnacht	Recap
No scoring		First period	No scoring
Henry (Truog, Mettler) (PP1) - 24:22; Henry (Backman, Graf) - 27:43		Second period	22:16 - M. Montandon (Castonguay, Emmerton) (PP2)
No scoring		Third period	41:52 - Vouillamoz (Krakauskas, Stockie); 56:09 - M. Montandon (Krakauskas, Vouillamoz); 59:04 - Lhoták (Emmerton, Castonguay)
Lorin Grüter ( 23 saves / 27 shots )		Goalie stats	Remo Giovannini ( 54 saves / 56 shots )

20 February	HC Sierre	5-6	OT	GCK Lions	Patinoire de Graben, Sierre	Recap
8:02 - A. Montandon (Volejníček, Meyrat)		First period		No scoring
29:54 - A. Montandon (Castonguay, M. Montandon) (PP1); 37:50 - Volejníček (Bougro, A. Montandon)		Second period		No scoring
59:16 - M. Montandon (Castonguay, Emmerton); 59:59 - Castonguay (Emmerton, A. Montandon) (PP1)		Third period		Kärki (Blaser, Hinterkircher) (PP1) - 49:06; Leone (Kärki, Backman) (PP1) - 53:07; Leone (Kärki, Blaser) - 54:45; Spring - 55:36; Spring (Baechler, Sējējs) - 57:15
No scoring		First overtime period		Hinterkircher (Blaser, Backman) (PP1) - 75:50
Remo Giovannini ( 29 saves / 35 shots )		Goalie stats		Lorin Grüter ( 34 saves / 39 shots )

23 February	GCK Lions	4-2	HC Sierre	Eishalle Küsnacht, Küsnacht	Recap
Leone (Ustinkov, Kärki) - 2:29; Truog (Henry, Schwendeler) - 6:53; Kärki (Leone, Backman) - 11:13		First period	No scoring
Leone (Backman, Büsser) - 27:28		Second period	32:48 - Bougro
No scoring		Third period	41:22 - Emmerton (Maret, Castonguay)
Lorin Grüter ( 27 saves / 29 shots )		Goalie stats	Remo Giovannini ( 27 saves / 31 shots )

25 February	HC Sierre	1-2	GCK Lions	Patinoire de Graben, Sierre	Recap
No scoring		First period	No scoring
30:21 - Bernazzi (M. Montandon, Vouillamoz)		Second period	Baechler (Hinterkircher) - 33:22; Henry (Sējējs, Graf) - 36:11
No scoring		Third period	No scoring
Remo Giovannini ( 24 saves / 26 shots )		Goalie stats	Lorin Grüter ( 34 saves / 35 shots )

GCK Lions won the series 4–2

=== Semi-Finals ===
==== (1) HC La Chaux-de-Fonds vs. (7) EHC Visp ====
1 March	HC La Chaux-de-Fonds	3-1	EHC Visp	Patinoire des Mélèzes, La Chaux-de-Fonds	Recap
No scoring		First period	No scoring
No scoring		Second period	32:58 - Haussener
Andersons (Olden, Matewa) - 51:45; Olden (Andersons, Matewa) - 54:45; Privet (EN) - 58:20		Third period	No scoring
Viktor Östlund ( 21 saves / 22 shots )		Goalie stats	Stefan Müller ( 36 saves / 38 shots )

3 March	EHC Visp	1-3	HC La Chaux-de-Fonds	Lonza Arena, Visp	Recap
No scoring		First period	3:36 - Loosli (Macquat, Stoffel)
No scoring		Second period	38:34 - Huguenin (Kohler, Schweri)
Chiriaev (Gähler) - 47:35		Third period	59:52 - Andersons (EN)
Stefan Müller ( 27 saves / 29 shots )		Goalie stats	Viktor Östlund ( 31 saves / 32 shots )

5 March	HC La Chaux-de-Fonds	3-1	EHC Visp	Patinoire des Mélèzes, La Chaux-de-Fonds	Recap
No scoring		First period	No scoring
No scoring		Second period	20:36 - Privet (Andersons, Huguenin); 26:54 - Olson (Olden, Andersons)
Kuonen (Eigenmann, Pinana) - 56:16 (PP1)		Third period	49:18 - Eugster (Olden, Huguenin)
Viktor Östlund ( 28 saves / 29 shots )		Goalie stats	Stefan Müller ( 24 saves / 27 shots )

8 March	EHC Visp	1-5	HC La Chaux-de-Fonds	Lonza Arena, Visp	Recap
No scoring		First period	2:06 - Eugster (Pouilly, Dufey); 2:49 - Olden (Andersons); 10:46 - Andersons (Jaquet, Huguenin)
Nilsson (Brüschweiler, Nunn) - 23:48		Second period	36:08 - Olson (Schweri)
No scoring		Third period	57:37 - Rüegsegger
Stefan Müller ( 29 saves / 34 shots )		Goalie stats	Viktor Östlund ( 37 saves / 38 shots )

HC La Chaux-de-Fonds won the series 4–0

==== (3) EHC Olten vs. (4) GCK Lions ====
1 March	EHC Olten	3-5	GCK Lions	Kleinholz Stadion, Olten	Recap
D. Weder (Antonietti, Wyss) - 0:52		First period	1:31 - Hinterkircher (Kärki, Backman) (PP1); 13:34 - Büsser (Baechler, Böhler)
Jabola Prada (Knellwolf, Elsener) - 23:39; Sterchi (D. Weder, Spiller) - 34:11		Second period	26:50 - Sējējs (Spring, Baechler); 27:47 - Kärki (Graf, Blaser) (PP1)
No scoring		Third period	59:55 - Mettler (Kärki) (EN)
Dominic Nyffeler ( 21 saves / 25 shots )		Goalie stats	Lorin Grüter ( 25 saves / 28 shots )

3 March	GCK Lions	2-3	OT	EHC Olten	Eishalle Küsnacht, Küsnacht	Recap
2:37 - Backman (Graf, Blaser) (PP2)		First period		No scoring
31:54 - Henry (Bünzli, Sējējs)		Second period		Ganz (De Nisco, Burger) - 23:01; D. Weder (Sterchi, Hächler) - 27:51
No scoring		Third period		No scoring
No scoring		First overtime period		Dal Pian (Wyss, Knellwolf) - 73:16
Lorin Grüter ( 44 saves / 47 shots )		Goalie stats		Dominic Nyffeler ( 18 saves / 20 shots )

5 March	EHC Olten	3-5	GCK Lions	Kleinholz Stadion, Olten	Recap
No scoring		First period	10:00 - Leone (Kärki, Blaser)
D. Weder (Spiller, Schmuckli) - 34:13		Second period	32:13 - Gruber (Böhler, Baechler)
Jabola Prada (Dal Pian, Ganz) - 41:03; Jabola Prada (Ganz, Wyss) - 47:29		Third period	43:40 - Mettler (Kärki, Leone); 50:15 - Neuenschwander (Blaser, Hinterkircher); 59:55 - Baechler (Kärki) (EN)
Dominic Nyffeler ( 15 saves / 19 shots )		Goalie stats	Lorin Grüter ( 35 saves / 38 shots )

8 March	GCK Lions	0-1	EHC Olten	Eishalle Küsnacht, Küsnacht	Recap
No scoring		First period	No scoring
No scoring		Second period	Dal Pian (Antonietti) - 27:55
No scoring		Third period	No scoring
Lorin Grüter ( 31 saves / 32 shots )		Goalie stats	Dominic Nyffeler ( 18 saves / 18 shots )

10 March	EHC Olten	5-2	GCK Lions	Kleinholz Stadion, Olten	Recap
Tufto (PS) - 1:22		First period	3:53 - Kärki (Leone, Blaser)
Horanský (Sterchi, D. Weder) - 28:36; Beauchemin (Wyss, Tufto) - 29:55		Second period	No scoring
Dal Pian (Horanský, Sterchi) (PP1) - 46:03; Horanský (Sterchi, D. Weder) - 57:33		Third period	46:50 - Mettler (Truog, Henry) (PP1)
Dominic Nyffeler ( 22 saves / 24 shots )		Goalie stats	Lorin Grüter ( 30 saves / 34 shots )

12 March	GCK Lions	3-1	EHC Olten	Eishalle Küsnacht, Küsnacht	Recap
No scoring		First period	Antonietti (Sterchi) - 8:46
27:40 - Böhler (Schwendeler); 34:13 - Kärki (Hinterkircher, Backman) (PP1)		Second period	No scoring
54:50 - Leone (Hinterkircher, Backman) (PP1)		Third period	No scoring
Lorin Grüter ( 31 saves / 32 shots )		Goalie stats	Dominic Nyffeler ( 30 saves / 33 shots )

16 March	EHC Olten	4-5	GCK Lions	Kleinholz Stadion, Olten	Recap
No scoring		First period	7:49 - Truog (Backman); 8:30 - Baechler (Graf, Böhler)
De Nisco (Melnalksnis, Öjdemark) - 32:01		Second period	No scoring
D. Weder (Sterchi) - 41:23; Spiller (Sterchi, Ganz) - 51:28; Dal Pian (Spiller, Ganz) - 59:34		Third period	43:07 - Henry (Leone, Büsser); 43:18 - Henry (Leone, Bünzli); 54:12 - Henry (Leone)
Dominic Nyffeler ( 14 saves / 19 shots ) Lucas Rötheli ( 0 saves / 0 shots )		Goalie stats	Lorin Grüter ( 29 saves / 33 shots )

GCK Lions won the series 4–3

=== Finals ===
17 March	HC La Chaux-de-Fonds	6-3	GCK Lions	Patinoire des Mélèzes, La Chaux-de-Fonds	Recap
Olden (Privet, Šmons ) - 10:22		First period	0:28 - Kärki (Henry, Landolt)
Privet (Andersons, Vogel) - 38:15		Second period	24:13 - Baechler (Böhler, Spring)
Loosli (Andersons, Olden) - 40:39; Andersons (Rüegsegger, Kohler) (PP1) - 56:44; Rüegsegger (Loosli, Pouilly) - 58:19; Privet (Rüegsegger) (EN) - 59:59		Third period	49:57 - Backman (Kärki, Blaser) (PP1)
Viktor Östlund ( 29 saves / 32 shots )		Goalie stats	Lorin Grüter ( 32 saves / 37 shots )

19 March	GCK Lions	5-4	2OT	HC La Chaux-de-Fonds	Eishalle Küsnacht, Küsnacht	Recap
4:45 - Buchli (Böhler, Baechler); 16:32 - Neuenschwander (Hinterkircher, Spring)		First period		Kohler (McShane, Huguenin) - 11:34
35:56 - Baechler (Büsser, Hinterkircher); 37:56 - Graf		Second period		Privet (Stoffel, Matewa) - 32:24
No scoring		Third period		Stoffel (Vogel, Reichle) - 45:49; Huguenin (Andersons, Privet) (PP1) - 57:31
98:23 - Graf (Böhler, Baechler)		Second overtime period		No scoring
Lorin Grüter ( 48 saves / 52 shots )		Goalie stats		Viktor Östlund ( 42 saves / 47 shots )

22 March	HC La Chaux-de-Fonds	3-2	OT	GCK Lions	Patinoire des Mélèzes, La Chaux-de-Fonds	Recap
No scoring		First period		2:45 - Henry (Leone, Kärki)
Eugster (Olden, Huguenin) (PP1) - 34:38; Olden (Andersons, Huguenin) (PP1) - 36:40		Second period		24:40 - Leone (Blaser, Kärki) (PP1)
No scoring		Third period		No scoring
Andersons (Olden, Privet) - 68:40		First overtime period		No scoring
Viktor Östlund ( 20 saves / 22 shots )		Goalie stats		Lorin Grüter ( 48 saves / 51 shots )

24 March	GCK Lions	1-4	HC La Chaux-de-Fonds	Eishalle Küsnacht, Küsnacht	Recap
4:02 - Graf (Kärki)		First period	Loosli (Pouilly, Barbei) - 10:31 Andersons (Olden, Privet) - 12:48
No scoring		Second period	No scoring
No scoring		Third period	Rüegsegger (Reichle, Pouilly) - 45:24 Olden (In-Albon) (EN) - 58:45
Lorin Grüter ( 30 saves / 33 shots )		Goalie stats	Viktor Östlund ( 28 saves / 29 shots )

26 March	HC La Chaux-de-Fonds	3-1	GCK Lions	Patinoire des Mélèzes, La Chaux-de-Fonds	Recap
No scoring		First period	No scoring
Andersons (Olden, Huguenin) - 22:54; In-Albon (Eugster, Kohler) - 33:03		Second period	No scoring
In-Albon (Andersons, Olden) - 43:39		Third period	55:23 - Schaller
Viktor Östlund ( 30 saves / 31 shots )		Goalie stats	Lorin Grüter ( 29 saves / 32 shots )

HC La Chaux-de-Fonds won the series 4–1
