= Mario Pouliot =

Canadian ice hockey coach (born 1963)

- Born: September 30, 1963 (age 62); Saint-Hyacinthe, Quebec, Canada
- Occupations: Ice hockey coach and general manager
- Family: Éric Castonguay (son-in-law)
- Awards: CHL Coach of the Year; Ron Lapointe Trophy; Maurice Filion Trophy; LHMAAAQ Hall of Fame
Ice hockey career
- Current OHL coach: Oshawa Generals
- Coached for: Baie-Comeau Drakkar; Acadie–Bathurst Titan; Rouyn-Noranda Huskies; Bonnyville Pontiacs; HC Sierre
- Coaching career: 1990–present

Mario Pouliot (born September 30, 1963) is a Canadian ice hockey coach who is the head coach of the Oshawa Generals. He began coaching in the Quebec Major Junior Hockey League (QMJHL) as an assistant coach with the Saint-Hyacinthe Laser. He later coached the Collège Antoine-Girouard Gaulois for eight seasons, and once held the Quebec AAA Midget Hockey League record for the most career wins by a head coach. He also led the Gaulois to the finals of the 2003 Air Canada Cup for the Canadian national Midget AAA championship. He later served two terms as an assistant coach for the Rouyn-Noranda Huskies around a head-coaching stint for the Baie-Comeau Drakkar. During this time, he was chosen as head coach of Team Quebec at the 2011 World U-17 Hockey Challenge.

Pouliot later coached the Acadie–Bathurst Titan for four seasons, and won the 2018 Memorial Cup championship, then served as the coach and general manager of the Rouyn-Noranda Huskies from 2018 to 2021. He was awarded both the Ron Lapointe Trophy as the QMJHL's coach of the year, and the Maurice Filion Trophy as the QMJHL's general manager of the year in the 2018–19 season. He was also named the Canadian Hockey League Coach of the Year, and led the Rouyn-Noranda Huskies to a 2019 Memorial Cup championship. In 2019, Pouliot became the only head coach to win consecutive Memorial Cup championships with different teams.

Retiring from the QMJHL after a heart attack in 2021, he later had brief coaching tenures with the Bonnyville Pontiacs of the Alberta Junior Hockey League, and professionally with HC Sierre of the Swiss League where he coached in son-in-law Éric Castonguay. He joined the Oshawa Generals in the Ontario Hockey League (OHL) as an associate coach in March 2025, and was named head coach for the 2025–26 OHL season.

== Early life ==
Mario Pouliot was born September 30, 1963, in Saint-Hyacinthe, Quebec. He played minor ice hockey as a defenceman. Attending training camp for the Granby Bisons in the Quebec Major Junior Hockey League (QMJHL) at age 17, he declined the team's offer and opted instead to play junior ice hockey in Saint-Hyacinthe. After graduating from junior hockey, he was offered a professional career in Germany, but turned it down also. He later regretted both choices, admitting they were mistakes.

== Coaching career ==
=== Early QMJHL coaching ===
Pouliot began coaching at age 20, as an assistant coach at the minor ice hockey level in Saint-Hyacinthe. He credit his friend and mentor Gaétan Pion for getting him started in coaching. Pouliot began his professional hockey career as a scout for the Saint-Hyacinthe Laser during the 1989–90 QMJHL season, and served as the team's assistant coach for the next four seasons until 1994. The team's general manager during this time was his mentor, Gaétan Pion. During his four seasons with the Laser, Saint-Hyacinthe earned a playoff berth in three seasons, but were eliminated in the first round each time. He worked under head coach Norman Flynn in the 1990–91 QMJHL season, head coach Pierre Petroni in the 1991–92 QMJHL season and 1992–93 QMJHL season, and head coach Richard Martel in the 1993–94 QMJHL season.

=== Collège Antoine-Girouard ===
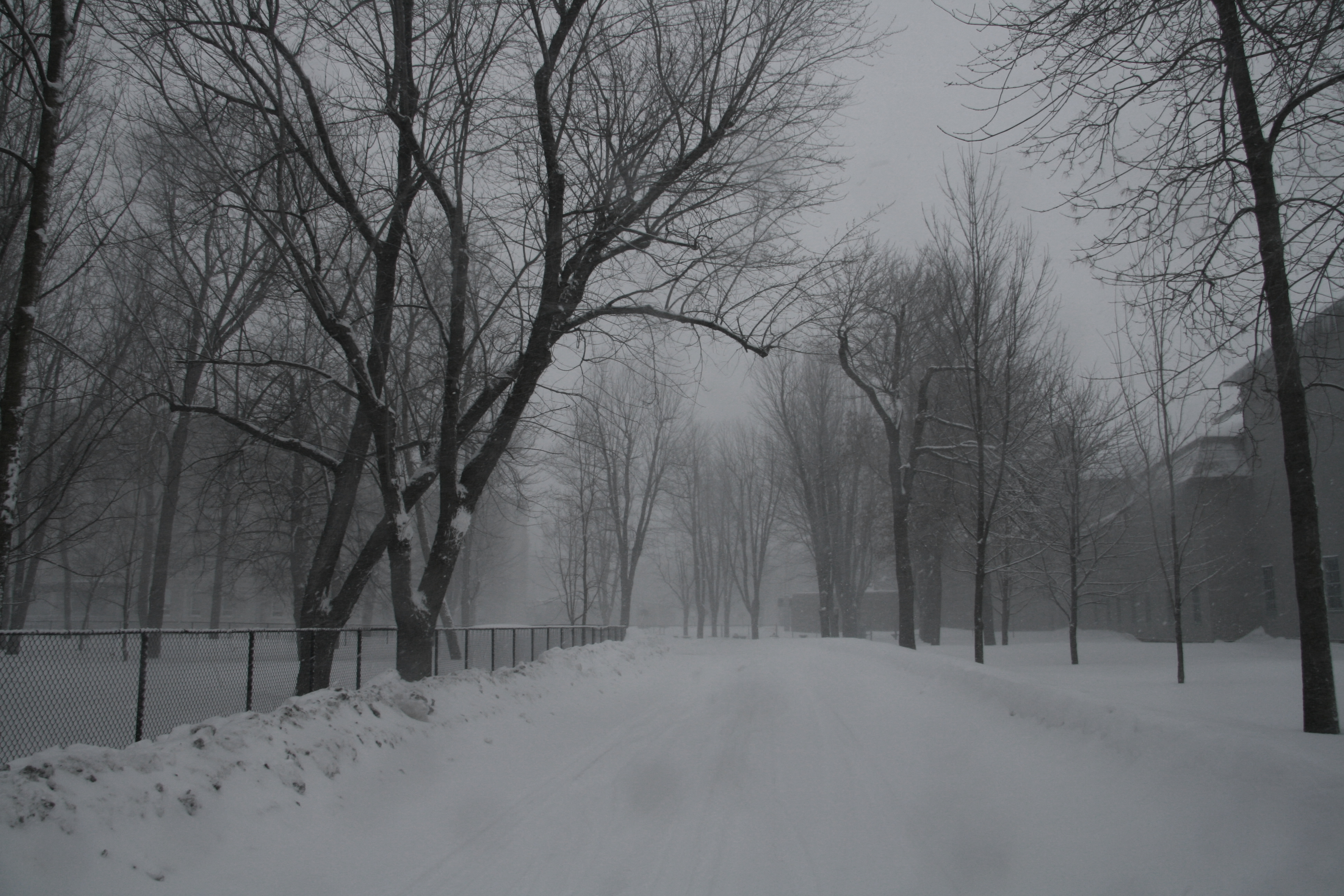
Collège Antoine-Girouard in winter

Pouliot served as an assistant coach for the Collège Antoine-Girouard Gaulois in the Quebec AAA Midget Hockey League (LHMAAAQ) from the 1997–98 season to the 2000–01 season, and as the team's head coach from the 2001–02 season to the 2008–09 season. He succeeded Simon Désautels who had been the team's only head coach to date, and was given the additional titles of general manager and team vice-president.

During his eight seasons as head coach of the Gaulois, Pouliot coached 346 games and set a league record of 250 coaching wins. (Note: Some sources indicate he achieved 251 career victories in the LHMAAAQ.) Under his guidance, the Gaulois won five regular season division titles, and won the 2002–03 season league playoffs championship. The Gaulois defeated Collège Charles-Lemoyne in five games for the LHMAAAQ championship. It was the first league title won by the Gaulois in the team's six-season existence. Pouliot stated that his team's strengths were its speed, puck movement, and transition game from offence to defence.

The Gaulois qualified for the 2003 Air Canada Cup, the Canadian national Midget AAA championship. He felt his team could win the national championship if they stayed focused and disciplined, but admitted he knew little about the opposing teams in the tournament. The national event was hosted at the Sault Memorial Gardens in Sault Ste. Marie, Ontario. Collège Antoine-Girouard represented the Quebec Region, and faced opponents from the Pacific, Western, Central, and Atlantic regions of Canada, and the local host team. The Gaulois finished the round-robin portion of the tournament undefeated, and won the semifinal game over the St. John's Maple Leafs midget team by a 3–2 score in overtime. In the gold medal game, Pouliot and the Gaulois lost the final 5–1 to Calgary, earning the silver medal at the Air Canada Cup.

=== Return to the QMJHL ===
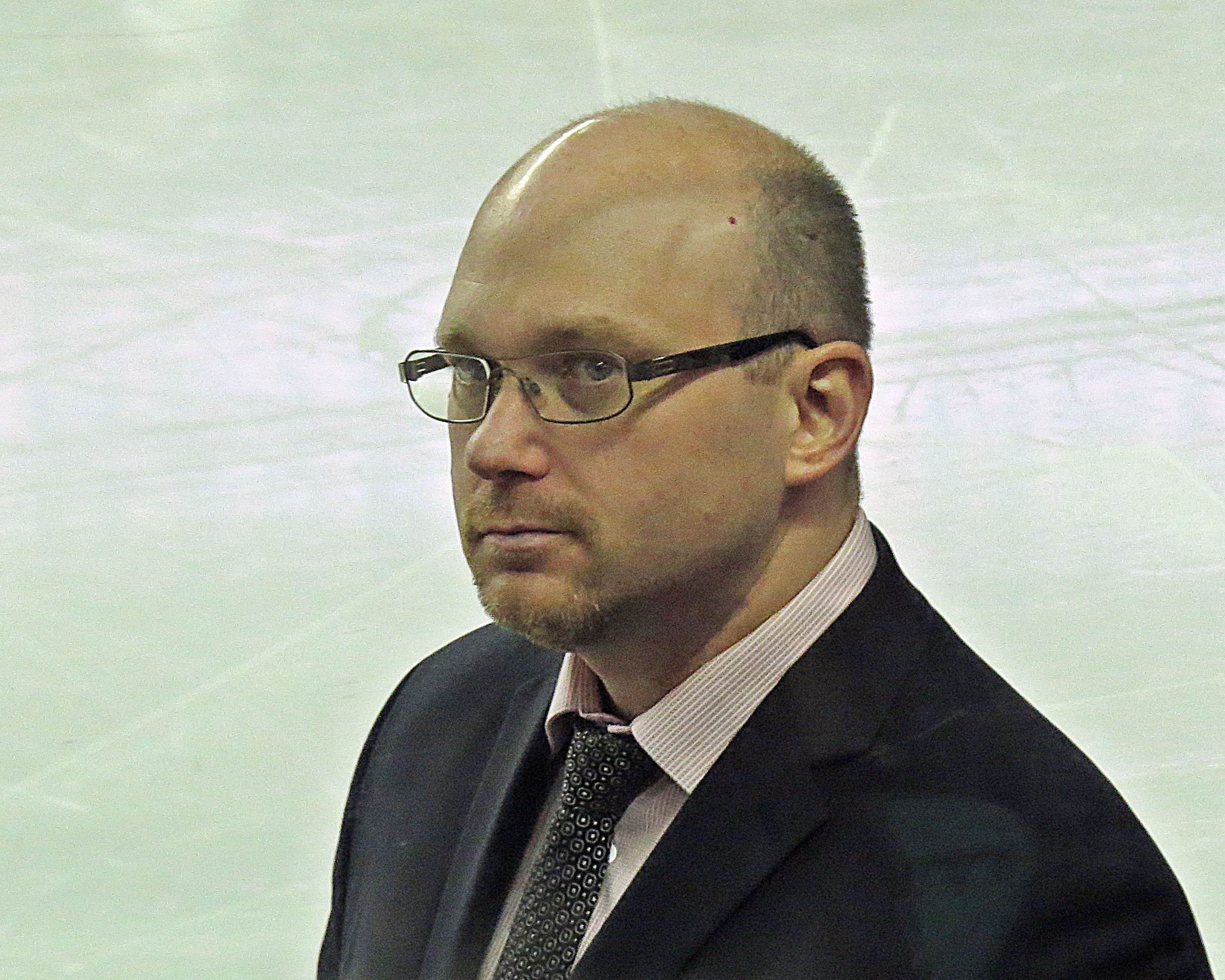
André Tourigny

In 2009, Pouliot quit his job in a laboratory in Saint-Hyacinthe, and accepted an assistant coaching position with the Rouyn-Noranda Huskies. He felt that returning to the QMJHL was an opportunity not to miss. He also looked forward to coaching with André Tourigny who had led both the Canada men's national under-18 ice hockey team and the Canada men's national junior ice hockey team. The Huskies finished the 2009–10 QMJHL season first place in the west division, and reached the second round of the playoffs. Pouliot began the next season with Rouyn-Noranda, but resigned in October when he was offered a head coaching position for another team in the QMJHL.

Pouliot was announced as the new head coach of the Baie-Comeau Drakkar on October 23, 2010. He took over a team in the process of rebuilding, and part-way through a 25-game winless streak which ended in a 4–3 win over Pouliot's former team, on November 26, 2010. His strategy was to implement an offensive style with speed, puck possessions, and better decision making. Despite his efforts, the Drakkar finished the 2010–11 QMJHL season sixth place in the east division, and did not qualify for the playoffs.

Pouliot was chosen to be head coach of Team Quebec at the 2011 World U-17 Hockey Challenge, with Dominique Ducharme as one of the assistant coaches. The event was hosted in Manitoba in December 2010, and January 2011. Pouliot felt that Team Quebec was solid defensively, would be able to play a fast and physical game, and maintain puck possession. The team was anchored on defence by Mike Matheson. Pouliot led Team Quebec to round-robin victories over Team Atlantic Canada, Finland and Germany, but lost to the United States. Quebec finished the preliminary round second place in Group B. Pouliot's squad faced Team Ontario in the semifinal game, but lost 2–1 in overtime to qualify for the bronze medal game. Team Quebec lost 5–4 in overtime to Team Pacific Canada in the bronze medal game, and finished the tournament in fourth place.

Pouliot remained with the Baie-Comeau Drakkar for the 2011–12 QMJHL season. On March 13, 2012, the Drakkar relieved Pouliot of his duties. The team had earned only five points in its last ten games, and dropped from ninth to fourteenth overall. The general manager Steve Ahern took over the team for the remaining three games and the playoffs.

Pouliot was reunited with the Rouyn-Noranda Huskies in the 2012–13 QMJHL season, returning to his role as an assistant coach to Tourigny. The Huskies finished the season second place in the west division, and reached the third round of the playoffs. Gilles Bouchard took over as the team's head coach for the 2013–14 QMJHL season, and Pouliot stayed as an assistant coach. The Huskies finished the season fifth place in the west division, and reached the second round of the playoffs.

=== Acadie–Bathurst Titan ===
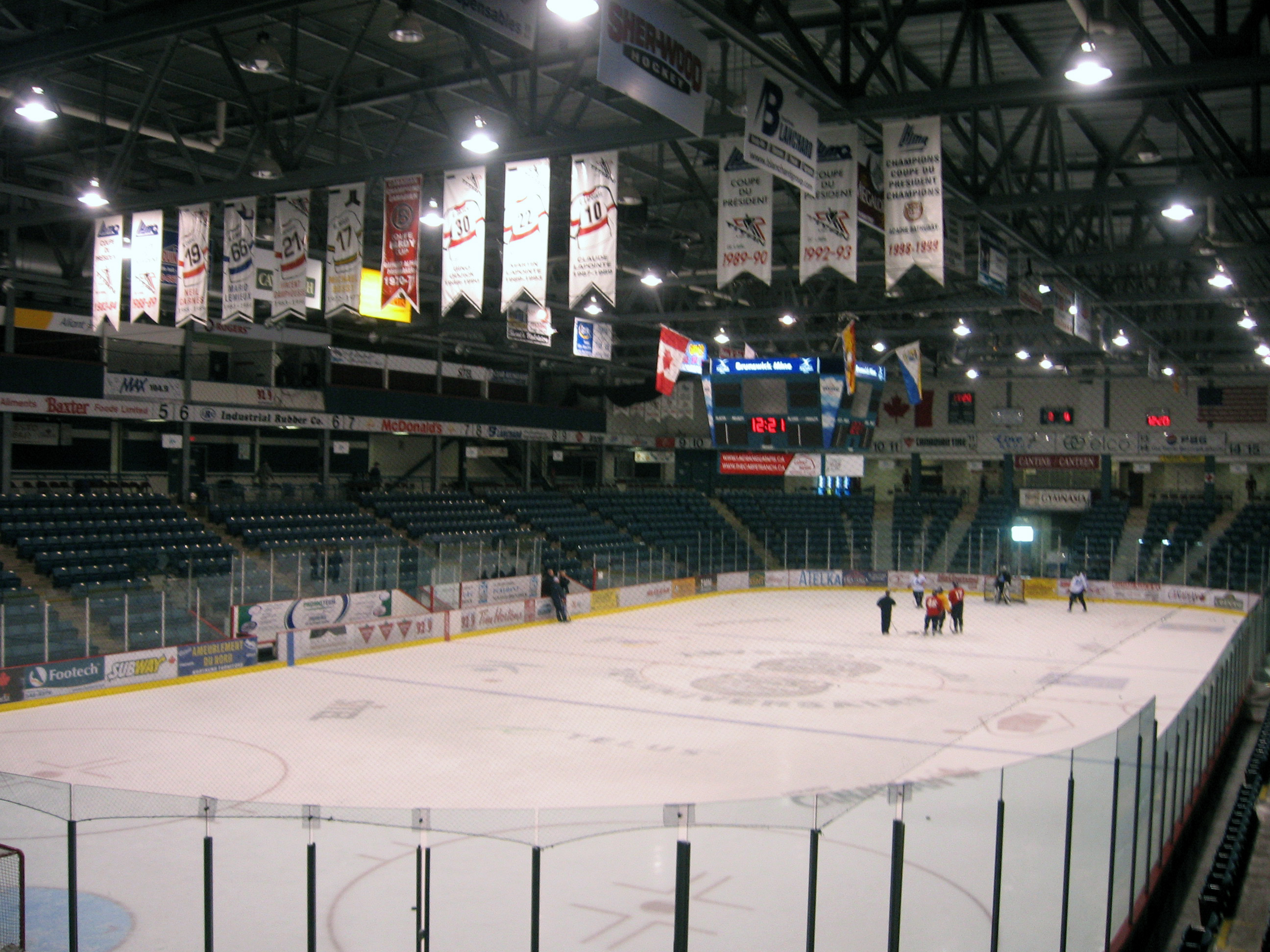
Interior of the K. C. Irving Regional Centre, home arena of the Titan

Pouliot became head coach of the Acadie–Bathurst Titan for the 2014–15 QMJHL season, succeeding Ron Choules. He was excited to return to a head coaching position, despite taking over a team at the bottom of the standings. He stated that "it had been a long time since I had so much fun leading a team", and that the people in Bathurst, New Brunswick were very welcoming. The Titan finished the season last place overall in the league with 42 points, and did not qualify for the playoffs.

In the 2015–16 QMJHL season, Pouliot improved the team record to 60 points and finished fifth in the Maritimes division, and 14th overall in the league. The Titan lost in the first round of the playoffs to the Saint John Sea Dogs in five games.

Pouliot led the Titan to 39 wins, and 84 points in the 2016–17 QMJHL season. Acadie–Bathurst placed third in the Maritimes division, and sixth overall in the QMJHL. In the playoffs, his team defeated the Quebec Remparts in round one, then lost in seven games to the Blainville-Boisbriand Armada in round two. His former colleague André Tourigny who was coaching the Halifax Mooseheads at the time, remarked that the Titan were a difficult team to beat, despite their young age. Pouliot had led the Titan to its first winning season in six years, and in March 2017, Acadie-Bathurst extended Pouliot's contract until the end of the 2018–19 season.

In the 2017–18 QMJHL season, Pouliot coached the Titan to an improved record for the fourth consecutive season. Acadie–Bathurst finished first in the Maritimes division, and second overall in the league with 43 wins and 96 points. In the playoffs, they defeated the Chicoutimi Saguenéens four games to two in round one, then defeated the Sherbrooke Phoenix four games to none in round two, and defeated the Victoriaville Tigres four games to none in the third round to reach the league's finals. Pouliot and the Titan won the President's Cup by defeating the first-overall Blainville-Boisbriand Armada in six games.

The Titan qualified for the 2018 Memorial Cup to determine the Canadian Hockey League (CHL) champion, hosted in Regina, Saskatchewan. The QMJHL champions faced the host Regina Pats, the Swift Current Broncos from the Western Hockey League, and the Hamilton Bulldogs from the Ontario Hockey League. Pouliot coached the Titan to 4–3 overtime victory over Swift Current in game one, then an 8–6 victory over Regina in game two. Prior to the Titan's third game, Pouliot and his general manager Sylvain Couturier planned for the possibility of a three-way tie for first place in the round-robin. They determined that if the situation arose, the team would defend a one-goal deficit to retain a tie-breaking advantage over Hamilton and Regina. In the final two minutes of the third period the Titan were trailing 3–2, but had a power play and a face-off in the attacking zone. Pouliot chose strategically not to pull his goaltender for an extra attacker, to prevent against conceding an empty net goal and losing by two goals. The Titan lost the game by one goal, but advanced directly to the final game based on the tie-breaker. Pouliot hated not going for the win, but called his decision "logical". Pouliot and the Titan went on to defeat the Regina Pats 3–0 in the championship game.

After the game, Pouliot was quoted as stating "it's special to have won the 100th Memorial Cup, it's forever etched in my memory. No one can ever take that away from me". The victory was the first Memorial Cup for Titan franchise, and the end of the road for Pouliot in Bathurst. He resigned his post in July, when the opportunity arose to coach another contending team in the upcoming season. In a 2025 interview, he stated "Bathurst will always hold an important place in my heart", and "I think the 2018 Memorial Cup is maybe the greatest accomplishment of my career".

=== Rouyn-Noranda Huskies ===
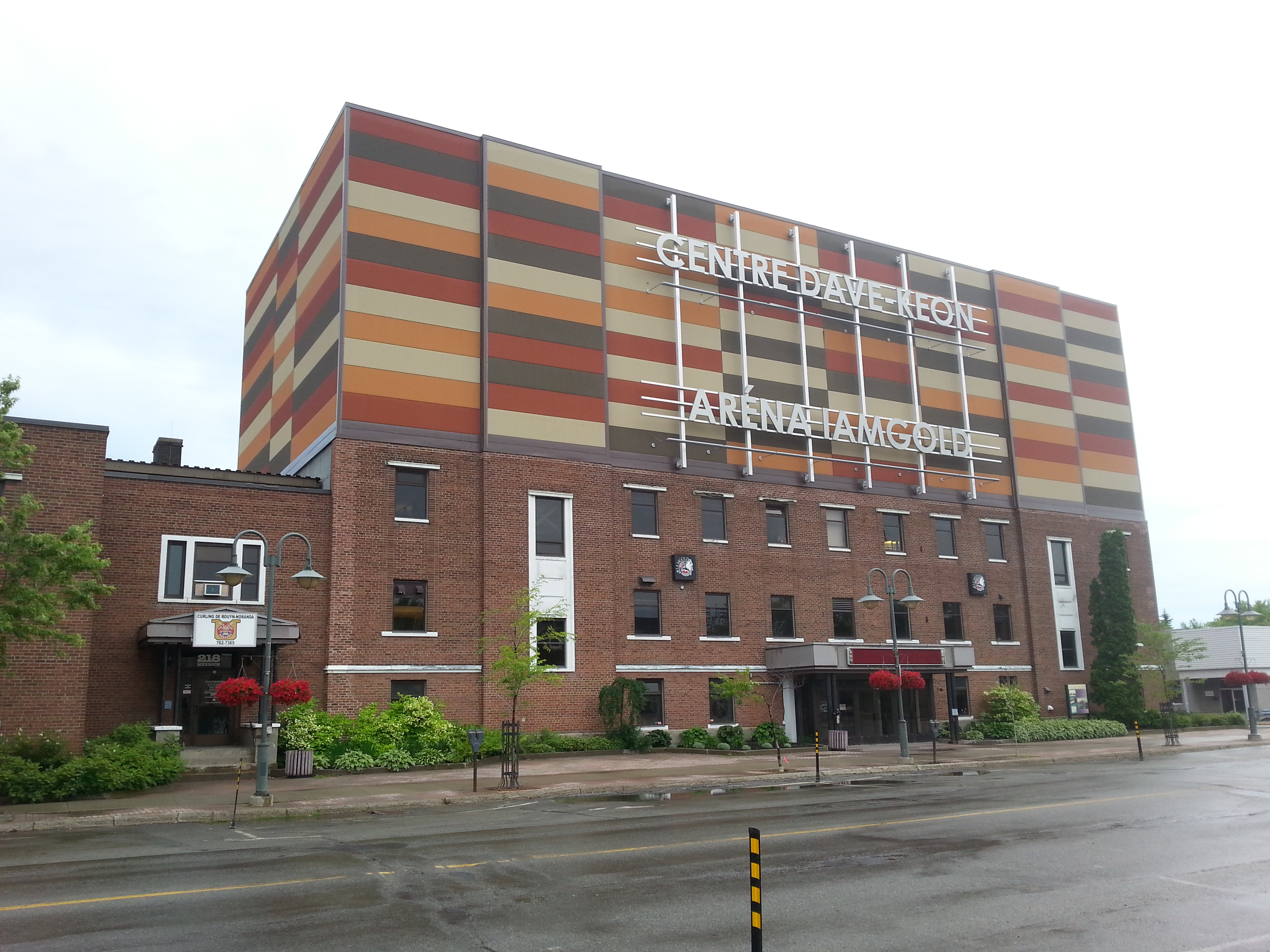
Aréna Iamgold, home of the Rouyn-Noranda Huskies

On July 5, 2018, Pouliot was announced the new head coach and general manager for the Rouyn-Noranda Huskies, and was signed to a four-year contract. He remarked that, "For me, it's like coming home. I had a special attachment to this team because it was my first stop if you want in the QMJHL and I have always had good relations with people here. It's an opportunity for advancement by occupying both positions, and I want to continue what André Tourigny and Gilles Bouchard have done". The Huskies were given special permission to talk with Pouliot, who was under contract to Acadie–Bathurst during negotiations.

Pouliot and the Huskies went into the 2018–19 QMJHL season with three returning players from the 2016 Memorial Cup team including, the league's top scorer Peter Abbandonato, Jacob Neveu and Samuel Harvey. Pouliot made three trades during the season to bring in National Hockey League prospects Noah Dobson, Joël Teasdale and Louis-Filip Côté. The Huskies won 59 games during the regular season to set a QMJHL record, tied a CHL record with 25 consecutive wins, and were ranked first overall in the CHL. Rouyn-Noranda finished the season with 119 points, to win the west division, the western conference, and were first overall in the QMJHL. In the playoffs, the Huskies defeated the Shawinigan Cataractes four games to two in round one, then defeated the Victoriaville Tigres four games to none in round two, and then the Rimouski Océanic four games to none in round three to reach the finals. Pouliot won his second consecutive President's Cup with a six-game victory over the Halifax Mooseheads.

The Memorial Cup

The Huskies and Pouliot qualified to play at the 2019 Memorial Cup. His team lost its first game to the Guelph Storm by a 5–2 score, then won its next two round-robin games 6–3 over the Prince Albert Raiders, and 4–3 over the Halifax Mooseheads who were hosting the event. Pouliot led his team to a 6–4 victory in the semifinals over the Guelph Storm, and won the championship game by a 4–2 score over Halifax. The victory was the first Memorial Cup title won by the Rouyn-Noranda Huskies, and after the game Pouliot said "all of our players grew up together and for me it's an amazing group. To win the President['s] Cup, to win the Memorial Cup you need a special group and they've done special things". As of 2019, Pouliot became the only head coach to win consecutive Memorial Cup championships with different teams, and joined Don Hay and Bryan Maxwell as the only head coaches to win the Memorial Cup with more than one team.

Pouliot led the Huskies to 29 wins in 63 games during the 2019–20 QMJHL season, and a second-place finish in the west division. The final five games of the regular season and the QMJHL playoffs were cancelled due to the COVID-19 pandemic in Canada.

During the 2020–21 QMJHL season, Pouliot had a heart attack on March 17, 2021. On the next day, he took an indefinite leave of absence from the Huskies. At the time he went on leave, he had led the Huskies to 15 wins and 34 points in the first 34 games of the schedule. (Note: Pouliot missed the final six games of the regular season after March 17. During this time, the team played six games with two wins, three losses and one overtime loss. The totals of 15 wins and 34 points were calculated by subtracting these six games from the team's season totals.) He did not return for the playoffs, and retired his positions for health reasons on May 25, 2021. In three seasons with the Huskies, he led the team to 113 victories combined in the regular seasons and playoffs.

In April 2021, Pouliot was the subject of an investigation by the QMJHL for "inappropriate behavior" with colleagues. According to Radio-Canada, he had a history of difficult relationships when his actions were perceived as "intimidation" and "bullying", that resolutions were handled internally by his team. Huskies' team owner Jacques Blais defended Pouliot, whom he described as "a great coach" and "an intense man"; and that "this commitment and attention to detail have enabled him to reach the highest peaks in Canadian junior hockey". As of 2023, no criminal charges were filed against him. In 2025, Le Soleil reported he departed the team after an investigation for "alleged inappropriate comments".

=== Bonnyville Pontiacs ===
Pouliot became head coach for the Bonnyville Pontiacs of the Alberta Junior Hockey League (AJHL), succeeding Brad Flynn who had been his assistant coach with the Titan. Pouliot became head coach on September 14, 2022, the week before the regular season began. Not originally interested in a return to coaching, he accepted the position as a favour to Flynn who resigned due to a family situation. Pouliot accepted since he was only the coach, without the burden of also being the general manager. He felt that "with a better work ethic and a new way of treating players", the Pontiacs could win their first AJHL championship.

With Pouliot as coach for the 2022–23 AJHL season, the Pontiacs led the North Division with 235 goals scored, and placed third in their division. He was surprised when nominated for AJHL coach of the year, since he did not know the other coaches and general managers in the league. In the playoffs, he led the Pontiacs to the North Division final for the second time in franchise history. The Pontiacs defeated the Lloydminster Bobcats four games to two in the first round, then defeated the Whitecourt Wolverines four games to one in the second round, then lost four games to one to the Spruce Grove Saints in the third round.

During the summer, Pouliot declined an offer to coach the upcoming hockey season in France. Instead, he signed a two-year contract extension to remain with the Pontiacs. On January 11, 2024, Pouliot departed the Pontiacs to coach in Switzerland and be closer to his family. At the time, the Pontiacs had 45 points in 42 games, and were eighth place in the 2023–24 AJHL season standings. In a 2025 interview, he stated that was proud to have coached in Bonnyville instead of retiring since "questions remained unanswered", and that he "wanted to see things through to the end".

=== HC Sierre ===
Pouliot was appointed head coach of HC Sierre in the Swiss League on January 11, 2024, with eight games remaining in the 2023–24 Swiss League season. It was his first opportunity to coach a professional hockey team. HC Sierre had lost five consecutive games and fired its coach, Yves Sarault. Pouliot's arrival resulted in a three-game winning streak. Pouliot signed a contract valid until the end of the season. Pouliot led HC Sierre to a fifth-place finish in the standings, but they lost four games to two versus the GCK Lions in the first round of playoffs.

HC Sierre signed Pouliot to a one-year contract for the 2024–25 Swiss League season. He was relieved of his duties on December 13, 2024, replaced by Dany Gelinas.

=== Oshawa Generals ===
Pouliot was hired by the Oshawa Generals in the Ontario Hockey League (OHL) in March 2025, as an associate coach for the remainder of the 2024–25 OHL season, working with interim head coach Brad Malone. Pouliot was aboard a train in Europe when offered the position. He accepted feeling that it "the facilities are first class" and "the guys are treated like it's a National Hockey League team". He also looked forward to "[discovering] the OHL from the inside". He helped the Generals win a second consecutive Bobby Orr Trophy as playoffs champions of the Eastern Conference, and was named head coach for the 2025–26 OHL season.

== Coaching philosophy ==
Pouliot was drawn to hockey due to the speed of the game, which he calls "the fastest sport in the world". He enjoys working on different systems of play, and the strategy of when to deploy different tactics. Pouliot considers it a privilege to be one the sixty head coaches in the CHL, and it is committed to working many hours during the long bus rides for games in the QMJHL. He watches many in-game videos on the busses, and talks at length with players to instill a hard work ethic and not having regrets. He states, "I demand that players have a good work ethic and I seek to develop a mentality of pride. I am a coach who believes in communication and I want to know my players to better help them". He wants his players to assess on-ice situations and react quickly. He also strives for the team's management to treat players as professionals and encourage individual progress. With respect to coaching in smaller market locations, Pouliot said "Even if you're a small market you have to think as a big market. For us it's really important to take care of the people we are drafting, making sure we give them the tools to develop and build a good team".

Pouliot considers Jacques Lemaire to be a role model due to Lemaire's attention to detail and preparedness. Pouliot stated he also learned a lot from both Clément Jodoin, and André Tourigny. Pouliot was praised by Tourigny who stated that "Mario is a hockey genius and a tireless worker. He works extremely hard. He's also a good person, a guy with a big heart".

== Coaching record ==
Season	Team	League	Games	Won	Lost	OTL/SL		Points	Win %	Standing	Playoffs
2001–02	Collège Antoine-Girouard Gaulois	LHMAAAQ	42	33	6	3		69	0.821	1st, league	
2002–03	Collège Antoine-Girouard Gaulois	LHMAAAQ	42	35	5	2		72	0.857	1st, league	Won LHMAAAQ championship Silver medal at 2003 Air Canada Cup
2003–04	Collège Antoine-Girouard Gaulois	LHMAAAQ	42	36	5	1		73	0.869	1st, league	
2004–05	Collège Antoine-Girouard Gaulois	LHMAAAQ	42	26	10	6		58	0.690	2nd, league	
2005–06	Collège Antoine-Girouard Gaulois	LHMAAAQ	44	27	8	9		63	0.716	3rd, league	
2006–07	Collège Antoine-Girouard Gaulois	LHMAAAQ	44	22	21	1		45	0.511	5th, league	
2007–08	Collège Antoine-Girouard Gaulois	LHMAAAQ	45	38	6	1		77	0.856	1st, league	
2008–09	Collège Antoine-Girouard Gaulois	LHMAAAQ	45	33	8	4		70	0.778	1st, league	
LHMAAAQ TOTALS			346	250	69	27		527	0.762	5 division titles	1 playoffs championship
Season	Team	League	Games	Won	Lost	OTL	SL	Points	Win %	Standing	Playoffs
2010–11	Baie-Comeau Drakkar	QMJHL	53	11	34	6	2	30	0.283	6th, East	Out of playoffs
2011–12	Baie-Comeau Drakkar	QMJHL	65	28	32	1	4	61	0.469	(6th, East)	Fired March 10, 2012
2014–15	Acadie–Bathurst Titan	QMJHL	68	17	43	6	2	42	0.309	6th, Maritimes	Out of playoffs
2015–16	Acadie–Bathurst Titan	QMJHL	68	27	35	3	3	60	0.441	5th, Maritimes	Lost in round 1
2016–17	Acadie–Bathurst Titan	QMJHL	68	39	23	4	2	84	0.618	3rd, Maritimes	Lost in round 2
2017–18	Acadie–Bathurst Titan	QMJHL	68	43	15	8	2	96	0.706	1st, Maritimes	Won President's Cup; Won 2018 Memorial Cup
2018–19	Rouyn-Noranda Huskies	QMJHL	68	59	8	0	1	119	0.875	1st, West	Won President's Cup; Won 2019 Memorial Cup
2019–20	Rouyn-Noranda Huskies	QMJHL	63	29	30	2	2	62	0.492	4th, West	No playoffs due to the COVID-19 pandemic
2020–21	Rouyn-Noranda Huskies	QMJHL	34	15	15	3	1	34	0.500	(5th, West)	On leave of absence
QMJHL TOTALS			555	268	235	33	19	588	0.530	2 division titles	2 President's Cups 2 Memorial Cups
2022–23	Bonnyville Pontiacs	AJHL	60	36	21	2	1	75	0.625	3rd, North	Lost in round 3
2023–24	Bonnyville Pontiacs	AJHL	42	21	18	3	0	45	0.536	(8th, league)	Resigned January 11, 2024
AJHL TOTALS			102	57	39	5	1	120	0.588		
2023–24	HC Sierre	Swiss	8	5	3	0	0	15	0.625	5th, league	Lost in round 1
2024–25	HC Sierre	Swiss	8	3	5	0	0	9	0.375	(8th, league)	Fired December 13, 2024
Swiss League TOTALS			16	8	8	0	0	24 (Note: The Swiss Leagues awards 3 points for a regulation win)	0.500		

Sources: (Note: Coaching record compiled from multiple sources: LHMAAAQ head coaching record; QMJHL head coaching record; 2022–23 AJHL season record; 2023–24 AJHL season record calculated by adding up all games prior to his resignation on January 11, 2024; 2023–24 Swiss League season calculated by adding up the last eight games of regular season (weeks 38 to 45); 2024–25 Swiss League season calculated by adding up all games prior to his release on December 13, 2024)

== Honours and awards ==
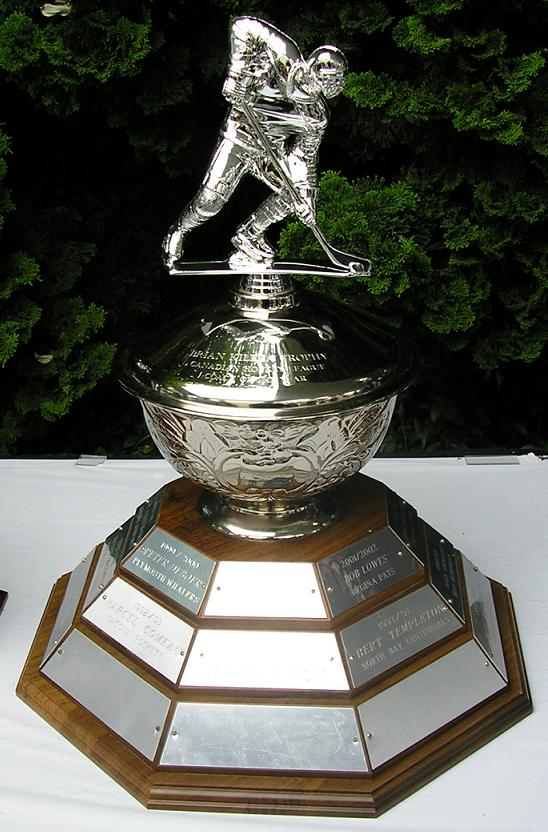
Brian Kilrea Coach of the Year Award

Pouliot was named coach of the year twice during his eight seasons coaching in the LHMAAAQ. He was inducted into the LHMAAAQ Hall of Fame in on May 1, 2011. He was the third coach to receive the honour, and one of the hall of fame's first twenty-nine inductees. In the 2018–19 QMJHL season, Pouliot was awarded the Ron Lapointe Trophy as the league's coach of the year, and the Maurice Filion Trophy as the league's general manager of the year. Pouliot was one of two nominees put forth by Hockey Québec, for the Sport Quebec coach of the year award in the 2018–19 season. He was ultimately named coach of the year for a team sport, by Sport Quebec on May 8, 2019. His daughters accepted the award on his behalf, stating that he was a tireless and passionate worked. On May 25, 2019, he was named the winner of the Brian Kilrea Coach of the Year Award as the CHL's coach of the year, and followed in the footsteps of his mentor Gilles Bouchard who won the award in 2016.

== Personal life ==
Pouliot has three children, including two daughters. He accepted the opportunity to coach in Switzerland to be closer to his grandchildren, and daughter who was married to HC Sierre player Éric Castonguay. Pouliot had coached his future son-in-law when Castonguay played for the Collège Antoine-Girouard Gaulois.

Pouliot's son Raphaël (born 1991), played on the Collège Antoine-Girouard Gaulois from 2006 to 2008 while his father coached. Raphaël later played in the QMJHL from 2009 to 2012 with the Shawinigan Cataractes, Montreal Juniors and Blainville-Boisbriand Armada; which coincided with his father's coaching tenures in Rouyn-Noranda and Baie-Comeau. Raphaël later served as the head scout for the Rouyn-Noranda Huskies from 2014 to 2016, and drafted many of the players which his father coached in the 2018–19 season. Prior to the 2019 Memorial Cup, Mario Pouliot said "my son drafted those kids because he believed in them. Having the opportunity to work with them [and] to end up with the President Cup['s], at the Mem[orial] Cup next week, is going to be special for me and my son and all the organization here".

Mario's older brother Robert Pouliot, served as the equipment manager for both the Collège Antoine-Girouard Gaulois and the Acadie–Bathurst Titan while Mario was the head coach.

Pouliot's mother died during the COVID-19 pandemic, then his father had a stroke soon after and died in 2023.
