= Vouillamoz =

Vouillamoz is a surname. Notable people with the surname include:

- Mathieu Vouillamoz (born 2000), Swiss ice hockey player
- Oxana Vouillamoz (born 2004), Swiss pair skater
- Yvan Vouillamoz (born 1969), Swiss ski jumper
