= Victor Backman (ice hockey) =

Swedish ice hockey player

- Born: June 16, 1991 (age 35) Öckerö, Sweden
- Height: 5 ft 11 in (180 cm)
- Weight: 192 lb (87 kg; 13 st 10 lb)
- Position: Forward
- Shoots: Left
- Swiss League team Former teams: HC Thurgau; Frölunda HC; Herning Blue Fox; Herlev Eagles; Stjernen Hockey; HPK; ZSC Lions; Malmö Redhawks
- Playing career: 2010–present

Victor Backman (born June 16, 1991) is a Swedish professional ice hockey forward who is currently playing for HC Thurgau of the Swiss League (SL).

== Playing career ==
In 2007 Backman represented Göteborg in TV-pucken, scoring two goals and six assist in eight games.

Backman scored his first Elitserien goal on December 26, 2011, against Joakim Lundström of Timrå IK. He scored his second goal on the game winning shot in the shootout of the same game which ended in a 2–1 win for Frölunda.

During the 2011–12 season, Backman was loaned to Borås HC in HockeyAllsvenskan, posting 10 goals and 16 assists in 44 regular season games, plus another nine points in 10 playoff contests. Over the following season he split time between VIK Västerås HK and IK Oskarshamn, before signing fully with Oskarshamn for the 2013–14 season, where he contributed 8 goals and 7 assists across 45 games.

In 2014–15, Backman moved abroad to Denmark's top tier the Metal Ligaen, playing for Herning Blue Fox and the following season for Herlev Eagles.

Backman's next major stint came in Norway with Stjernen Hockey for the 2016–17 season, where he delivered an impressive 54 points (26 G, 28 A) in 40 regular season games, helping propel his team into the playoffs.

Since 2018, Backman has played primarily in Switzerland with the GCK Lions in the second tier Swiss League (SL) and had stints with ZSC Lions in the top tier National League (NL). Notably, in 2018–19 he delivered 34 points in 23 SL games and added 11 points in 16 NL contests. The following season he recorded 42 points in 31 SL games

In 2020–21, Backman returned to Sweden with Malmö Redhawks in the SHL, appearing in 40 games and producing 4 points. He subsequently returned to GCK Lions, where he continued to be a consistent offensive presence: 32 points in 36 games in 2021–22, 42 points in 41 games in 2022–23, and 29 points in 28 games in 2023–24.

== Career statistics ==
=== Regular season and playoffs ===
			Regular season					Playoffs
Season	Team	League	GP	G	A	Pts	PIM	GP	G	A	Pts	PIM
2008–09	Frölunda HC	J20	5	0	0	0	0	—	—	—	—	—
2009–10	Frölunda HC	J20	39	17	15	32	80	5	2	4	6	6
2010–11	Frölunda HC	J20	39	36	35	71	28	7	7	1	8	4
2010–11	Kungälvs IK	Div. 1	2	0	4	4	2	—	—	—	—	—
2010–11	Frölunda HC	SEL	17	0	0	0	2	—	—	—	—	—
2011–12	Frölunda HC	SEL	8	2	1	3	0	—	—	—	—	—
2011–12	Borås HC	Allsv	44	10	16	26	16	10	0	9	9	6
2012–13	VIK Västerås HK	Allsv	37	5	10	15	10	—	—	—	—	—
2012–13	IK Oskarshamn	Allsv	11	4	5	9	12	6	1	5	6	8
2013–14	IK Oskarshamn	Allsv	45	8	7	15	16	—	—	—	—	—
2014–15	IK Oskarshamn	Allsv	18	3	3	6	4	—	—	—	—	—
2014–15	Herning Blue Fox	DEN	26	10	7	17	14	15	6	5	11	12
2015–16	Herlev Eagles	DEN	30	11	13	24	55	15	6	5	11	12
2015–16	Mora IK	Allsv	13	0	0	0	4	5	1	0	1	0
2016–17	Stjernen Hockey	NOR	40	26	28	54	36	2	1	1	2	2
2017–18	HPK	Liiga	9	1	0	1	0	—	—	—	—	—
2017–18	BIK Karlskoga	Allsv	15	1	2	3	10	—	—	—	—	—
2018–19	GCK Lions	SL	23	13	21	34	20	—	—	—	—	—
2018–19	ZSC Lions	NL	16	4	7	11	4	—	—	—	—	—
2019–20	GCK Lions	SL	31	16	26	42	22	5	0	2	2	0
2019–20	ZSC Lions	NL	2	0	1	1	2	—	—	—	—	—
2020–21	Malmö Redhawks	SHL	40	2	2	4	8	—	—	—	—	—
2021–22	GCK Lions	SL	36	13	19	32	39	6	1	6	7	4
2021–22	ZSC Lions	NL	12	1	4	5	6	—	—	—	—	—
2022–23	GCK Lions	SL	41	13	29	42	18	11	3	13	16	8
2023–24	GCK Lions	SL	28	8	21	29	16	18	3	11	14	8
2024–25	GCK Lions	SL	41	9	29	38	34	5	4	1	5	4
J20 totals			83	53	50	103	108	12	9	5	14	10
