= Cory Emmerton =

Canadian ice hockey coach (born 1988)

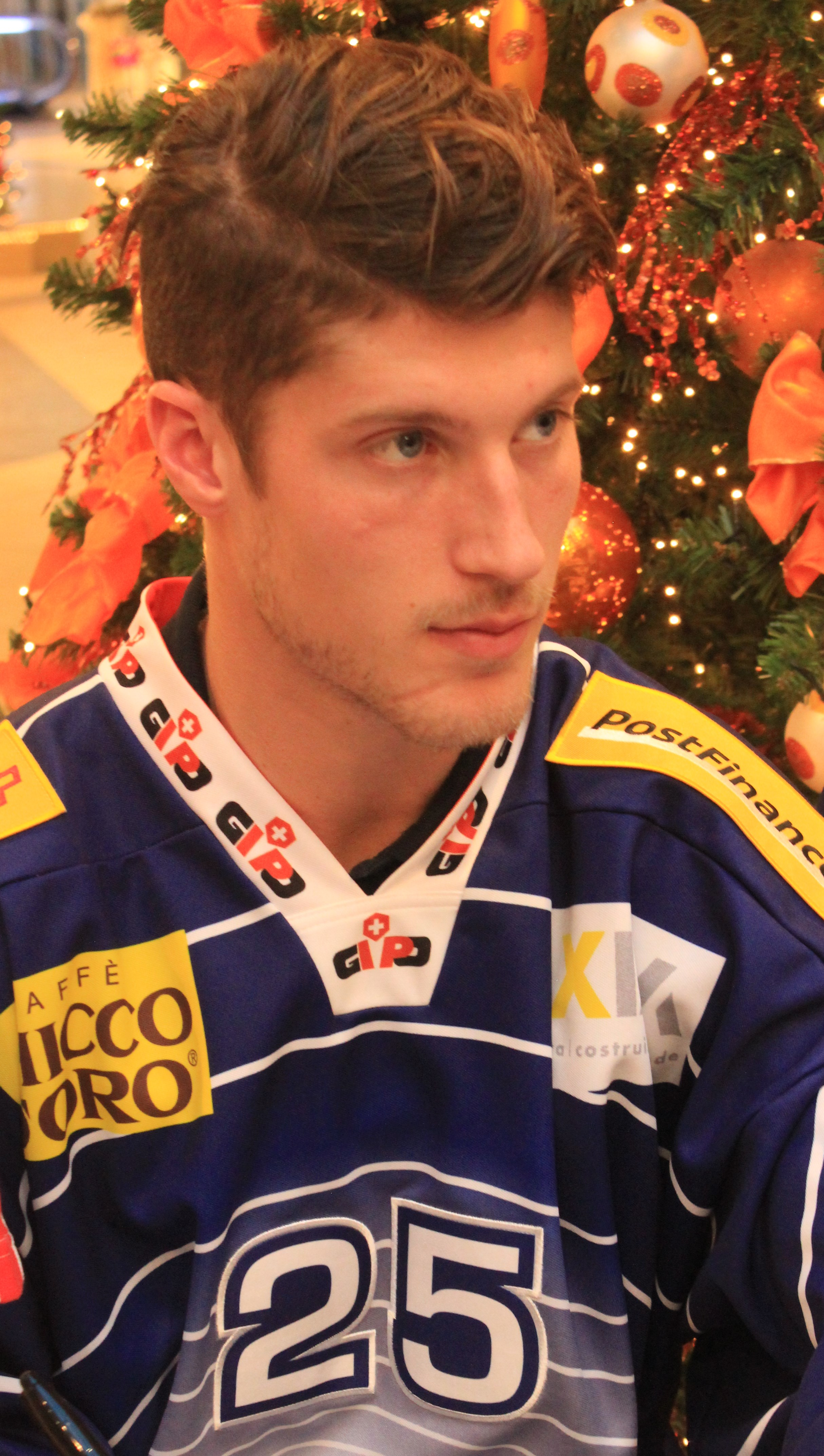
- Born: June 1, 1988 (age 38) St. Thomas, Ontario, Canada
- Height: 6 ft 0 in (183 cm)
- Weight: 191 lb (87 kg; 13 st 9 lb)
- Position: Centre
- Shot: Left
- Played for: Detroit Red Wings; SaiPa; HC Sochi; HC Ambrì-Piotta; Sibir Novosibirsk; Lausanne HC; HC Fribourg-Gottéron; HC Sierre
- Current NL coach: Lausanne HC
- NHL draft: 41st overall, 2006; Detroit Red Wings
- Playing career: 2007–2024
- Coaching career: 2025–present

Cory Emmerton (born June 1, 1988) is a Canadian professional ice hockey coach for the Lausanne HC. He previously played as a centre in the National Hockey League (NHL) with the Detroit Red Wings. Emmerton was drafted 41st overall by the Red Wings in the 2006 NHL entry draft.

== Playing career ==
Emmerton grew up playing minor hockey for his hometown St. Thomas Travellers of the OMHA and the Elgin-Middlesex Chiefs of the Pavilion AAA league in Ontario.

=== Junior ===
==== Kingston Frontenacs (2004–2007) ====
The Kingston Frontenacs selected Emmerton with their 5th round, 89th overall pick in the 2004 OHL Priority Selection from the Elgin-Middlesex Chiefs. He made the team out of training camp, and in his rookie season, scored 17 goals and added 21 assists in 58 games, finishing 6th in team scoring.

In 2005–06, Emmerton led the Frontenacs in scoring with 90 points in 66 games, helping the team make the playoff for the first time since he joined the club. In the playoffs, Kingston was eliminated in the opening round in 6 games, with Emmerton held to two points, both goals. In the 2006 NHL entry draft, the Detroit Red Wings selected him in the 2nd round, 41st overall selection.

During the 2006–07 season, missing some time to injuries, he appeared in only 40 regular season games. He finished fourth in team scoring with 66 points, as the team once again made the playoffs. Emmerton lead Kingston with five goals and seven points in five games, as Kingston was eliminated in the first round.

He returned to Kingston in 2007–08, and was named team captain, but the Frontenacs soon fell out of playoff contention, and in early December, Emmerton was traded to the Brampton Battalion for Justin Levac, Thomas Middup, 2nd and 3rd round picks in 2008, 2nd and 3rd round picks in 2009, and a 6th round pick in 2010. At the time of the trade, Emmerton was leading the Frontenacs with 31 points in 24 games.

==== Brampton Battalion (2007–2008) ====
In his first game for Brampton Battalion, Emmerton scored a goal and add two assists to help the Battalion defeat the top team in the league, the Kitchener Rangers. Shortly after his trade to Brampton, Emmerton competed for a spot on the Canadian National Junior Team, but was sent home after being diagnosed with infectious mononucleosis. Emmerton came back from his illness, and recorded 30 points in 30 games with Brampton, followed by two assists in five playoff games with the team.

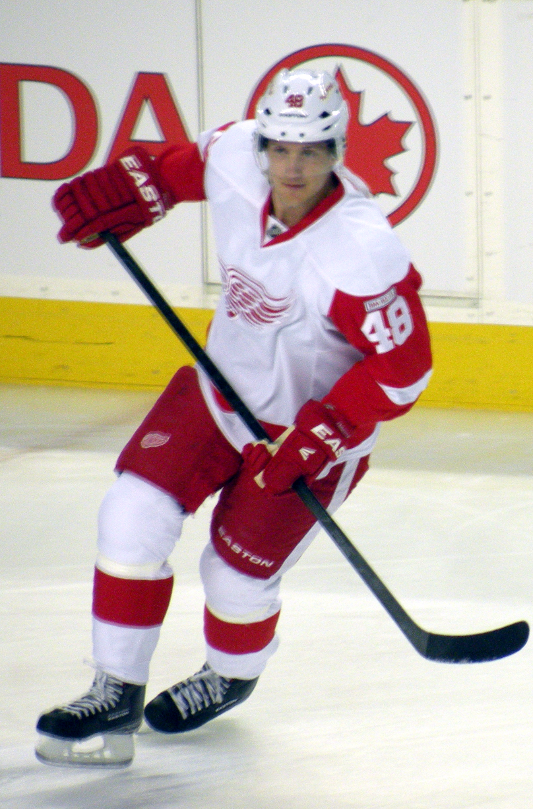
Emmerton with the Detroit Red Wings in 2012.

=== Professional ===
==== Detroit Red Wings (2006–2014) ====
Emmerton played a couple of games with the Grand Rapids Griffins in the 2007 playoffs after the Frontenacs were eliminated from the OHL playoffs, going pointless in two games. He was signed to a three-year entry-level contract with the Detroit Red Wings on June 4, 2007. After the Battalion were eliminated in the first round of the 2008 OHL playoffs, the Red Wings would once again bring Emmerton up to the Griffins, as he recorded an assist in seven regular season games with the club.

In his first full season with the Griffins in the 2008-09 season, Emmerton scored 10 goals and 35 points in 69 games. In nine playoff games, Emmerton registered one goal.

Emmerton returned to Grand Rapids for the 2009-10. He played in 76 games, scoring 12 goals and 37 points, and finishing sixth in team scoring. Grand Rapids failed to qualify for the Calder Cup playoffs.

In 2010-11, Emmerton appeared in 65 games with the Griffins, scoring 12 goals and 38 points, good for fifth in team scoring, however, the club failed to reach the post-season for the second straight season.

Emmerton played two games in the 2010–11 season for Detroit and finished the season with their farm team, the Grand Rapids Griffins. He played his first NHL game on Saturday, January 22, 2011, and scored his first NHL goal against Corey Crawford of the Chicago Blackhawks.

Emmerton was able to secure a steady NHL spot commencing with the 2011–12 NHL season. In 71 games, Emmerton had six goals and 10 points, and followed that up with a goal in five playoff games. He was named 2011-12 Detroit Red Wings Rookie of the Year by the Detroit Sports Broadcasters Association on June 6, 2012.

In 2012-13 NHL season, Emmerton appeared in all 48 games for the Red Wings in the lockout shortened season, scoring five goals and eight points. In 13 playoff games, Emmerton was held to an assist.

Emmerton spent the majority of the 2013-14 with the Grand Rapids Griffins, scoring 16 goals and 46 points in 53 games. In 10 playoff games, Emmerton had two goals and nine assists. He also appeared in 18 games with the Red Wings in 2013-14, earning two assists.

==== Europe (2014–2024) ====
On May 23, 2014, as an impending free agent with the Red Wings, Emmerton opted to sign his first European contract, agreeing to a one-year contract for the HC Sochi inaugural season in the KHL.

Emmerton appeared in all 60 games with HC Sochi of the KHL in the 2014–15 season, scoring 17 goals and 29 points. In four playoff games, Emmerton was held pointless.

On June 8, 2015, Emmerton signed a two-year contract with HC Ambrì-Piotta of the Swiss National League (NL). He finished his first season fourth in scoring for Ambri-Piotta, tallying 15 goals and 21 assists in 49 regular season games. He suited up for three of Ambri's six relegation games, scoring twice while missing the three games as a healthy scratch.

On June 21, 2017, Emmerton was signed to a one-year contract extension by HC Ambri-Piotta.

In October 2018, Emmerton left the KHL to join Lausanne HC on a one-year deal. In April 2019, Emmerton signed a two-year contract extension with Lausanne through the 2020–21 season. Emmerton fractured his elbow after being hit by a puck in a game against HC Fribourg-Gottéron on January 25, 2020. This required surgery, forcing him to sit out the remainder of the 2019–20 season. On February 22, 2021, Emmerton was signed to an early two-year contract extension by Lausanne through to the end of the 2022/23 season.

For the 2023–24 season, Emmerton signed with the HC Sierre. At the end of the season, Emmerton did not sign a new contract, retiring from play.

== Coaching career ==
In June 2025, Emmerton signed a two-year contract as an assistant coach for the Lausanne HC

== Career statistics ==
=== Regular season and playoffs ===
			Regular season					Playoffs
Season	Team	League	GP	G	A	Pts	PIM	GP	G	A	Pts	PIM
2003–04	Elgin Middlesex Canucks U16 AAA	AH	32	33	24	57	26	—	—	—	—	—
2003–04	St. Thomas Stars	WOHL	4	0	0	0	0	3	0	0	0	0
2004–05	Kingston Frontenacs	OHL	58	17	21	38	8	—	—	—	—	—
2005–06	Kingston Frontenacs	OHL	66	26	64	90	32	6	2	0	2	6
2006–07	Kingston Frontenacs	OHL	40	29	37	66	22	5	5	2	7	6
2006–07	Grand Rapids Griffins	AHL	—	—	—	—	—	2	0	0	0	0
2007–08	Kingston Frontenacs	OHL	24	13	18	31	6	—	—	—	—	—
2007–08	Brampton Battalion	OHL	30	12	18	30	10	5	0	2	2	2
2007–08	Grand Rapids Griffins	AHL	7	0	1	1	0	—	—	—	—	—
2008–09	Grand Rapids Griffins	AHL	69	10	25	35	18	9	1	0	1	2
2009–10	Grand Rapids Griffins	AHL	76	12	25	37	22	—	—	—	—	—
2010–11	Detroit Red Wings	NHL	2	1	0	1	0	—	—	—	—	—
2010–11	Grand Rapids Griffins	AHL	65	12	26	38	26	—	—	—	—	—
2011–12	Detroit Red Wings	NHL	71	6	4	10	14	5	1	0	1	2
2012–13	SaiPa	SM-liiga	1	0	0	0	0	—	—	—	—	—
2012–13	Detroit Red Wings	NHL	48	5	3	8	4	13	0	1	1	4
2013–14	Detroit Red Wings	NHL	18	0	2	2	4	—	—	—	—	—
2013–14	Grand Rapids Griffins	AHL	53	16	30	46	14	10	2	7	9	2
2014–15	HC Sochi	KHL	60	17	12	29	16	4	0	0	0	2
2015–16	HC Ambrì–Piotta	NLA	49	15	21	36	10	—	—	—	—	—
2016–17	HC Ambrì–Piotta	NLA	50	11	23	34	8	—	—	—	—	—
2017–18	HC Ambrì–Piotta	NLA	40	12	16	28	10	—	—	—	—	—
2018–19	Sibir Novosibirsk	KHL	11	0	0	0	6	—	—	—	—	—
2018–19	Lausanne HC	NL	36	12	12	24	2	12	4	2	6	4
2019–20	Lausanne HC	NL	33	7	10	17	6	—	—	—	—	—
2020–21	Lausanne HC	NL	43	10	15	25	6	6	1	3	4	2
2021–22	Lausanne HC	NL	34	5	5	10	6	1	0	0	0	2
2022–23	Lausanne HC	NL	31	6	11	17	0	—	—	—	—	—
2023–24	HC Sierre	SL	42	15	27	42	16	6	1	9	10	0
2023–24	HC Fribourg-Gottéron	NL	1	0	0	0	0	1	0	0	0	0
AHL totals			270	50	107	157	80	21	3	7	10	4
NHL totals			139	12	9	21	22	18	1	1	2	6
NLA / NL totals			317	78	113	191	48	20	5	5	10	8

Medal record

Ice hockey

Representing Canada

Spengler Cup
Gold medal – first place	2015 Davos	
Gold medal – first place	2016 Davos	

=== International ===
Year	Team	Event	Result	GP	G	A	Pts	PIM
2005	Canada Ontario	U17	4th	6	3	3	6	2
2005	Canada	U18	1st place, gold medalist(s)	5	1	0	1	2
2006	Canada	WJC18	4th	7	1	1	2	2
Junior totals				18	5	4	9	6
