= Benjamin Antonietti =

Swiss professional ice hockey player

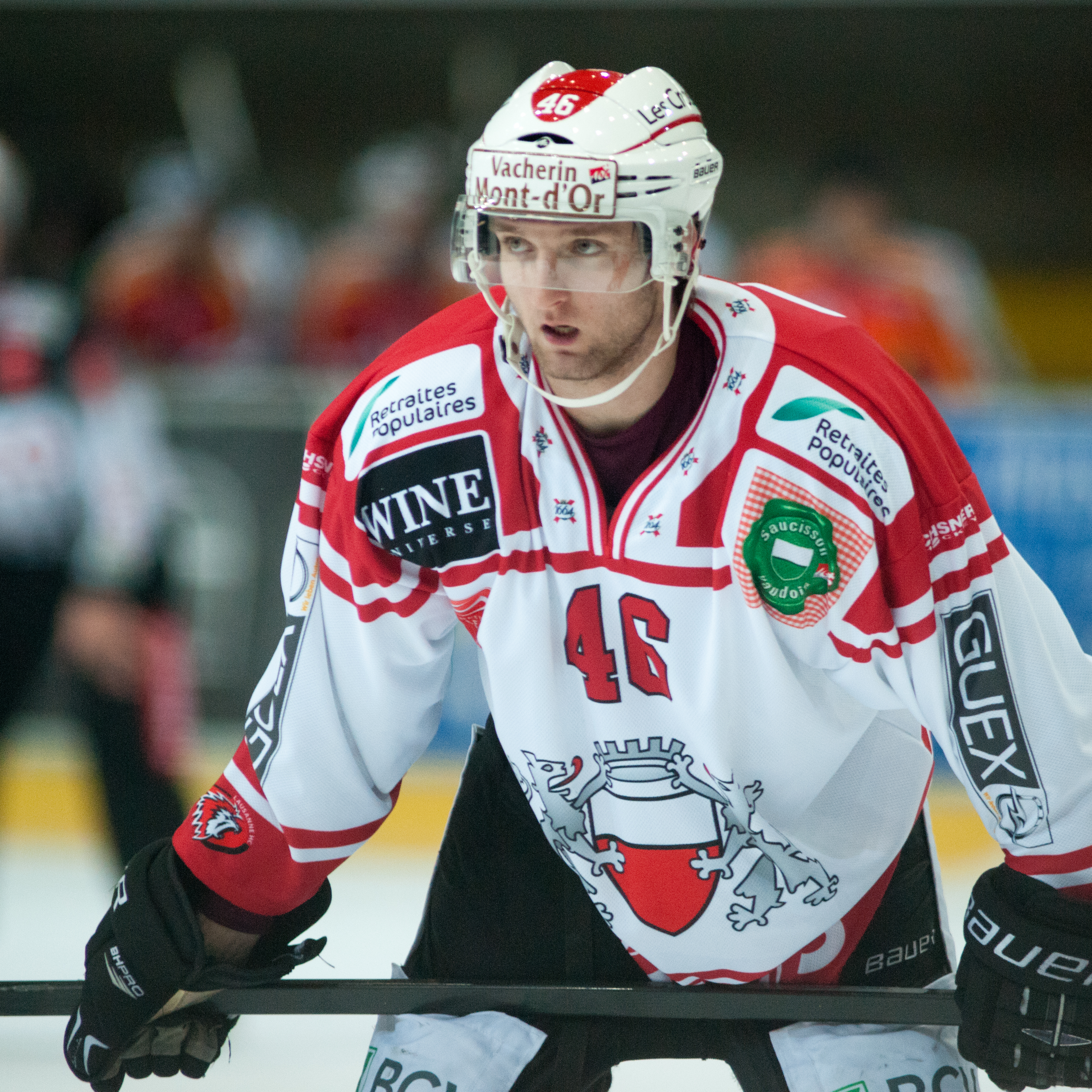
- Born: 7 July 1991 (age 34); Orbe, Switzerland
- Height: 5 ft 11 in (180 cm)
- Weight: 176 lb (80 kg; 12 st 8 lb)
- Position: Left wing
- Shot: Right
- Played for: Dragons de Rouen; Lausanne HC; Genève-Servette HC
- Playing career: 2008–2023

Benjamin Antonietti (born 7 July 1991) is a Swiss former professional ice hockey player. He spent most of his career with Genève-Servette HC and Lausanne HC of the National League (NL). He also briefly played with the Dragons de Rouen of the French league.

== Playing career ==
Antonietti made his National League A debut playing with Genève-Servette HC during the 2009–10 NLA season.

After a rather unsuccessful 2016–17 season with Lausanne where he tallied only 8 points in 42 games, he was a healthy scratch for most of the 2017 playoffs. At the end of the season, Lausanne decided not to offer him any contract extension, allowing him to agree to a one-year deal with the Dragons de Rouen of the French Ligue Magnus. On 5 January 2018 Antonietti decided to leave the rather weak Ligue Magnus after having tallied 35 points (12 goals) in 31 games, a career-high for him in a single season, even though he did not play a full season in Rouen. This allowed him to join back Lausanne HC and played his first game of the season on 6 January 2018 against EHC Kloten, failing to score a single point.

On 19 April 2018 Antonietti agreed to a two-year contract extension with Lausanne HC worth CHF 900,000. On 18 April 2020 Antonietti was signed to a one-year contract extension by Lausanne HC.

On 3 February 2021 it was announced that Antonietti would return to Genève-Servette for the 2021–22 season, joining the team on a two-year deal.

== Personal life ==
He is the older brother of EHC Olten defenseman, Eliot Antonietti.

== Career statistics ==
			Regular season					Playoffs
Season	Team	League	GP	G	A	Pts	PIM	GP	G	A	Pts	PIM
2003–04	Genève-Servette HC U15	Mini Top	—	—	—	—	—	—	—	—	—	—
2004–05	Genève-Servette HC U17	Elite Novizen	—	—	—	—	—	—	—	—	—	—
2006–07	Genève-Servette HC U17	Elite Novizen	32	15	14	29	72	5	3	2	5	26
2006–07	Genève-Servette HC U20	Elite Jr. A	5	2	0	2	2	—	—	—	—	—
2007–08	Genève-Servette HC U17	Elite Novizen	20	15	11	26	58	—	—	—	—	—
2007–08	Genève-Servette HC U20	Elite Jr. A	33	1	16	17	58	—	—	—	—	—
2008–09	Genève-Servette HC U20	Elite Jr. A	30	13	14	27	110	7	7	10	17	8
2008–09	CP de Meyrin U20	Top Junioren	1	1	0	1	0	—	—	—	—	—
2008–09	EHC Basel	NLB	17	5	1	6	4	—	—	—	—	—
2009–10	Genève-Servette HC U20	Elite Jr. A	16	8	10	18	16	3	0	1	1	4
2009–10	Genève-Servette HC	NLA	10	0	0	0	0	5	0	0	0	0
2009–10	EHC Basel Sharks	NLB	15	1	2	3	2	—	—	—	—	—
2010–11	Genève-Servette HC U20	Elite Jr. A	3	2	2	4	0	—	—	—	—	—
2003–04	Genève-Servette HC	NLA	5	0	0	0	2	—	—	—	—	—
2010–11	Lausanne HC	NLB	31	9	7	16	12	17	4	2	6	4
2011–12	Lausanne HC	NLB	42	9	7	16	16	15	0	3	3	2
2011–12	Genève-Servette HC	NLA	5	0	0	0	2	—	—	—	—	—
2012–13	Lausanne HC	NLB	48	13	10	23	26	15	6	5	11	10
2013–14	Lausanne HC	NLA	50	4	3	7	22	6	3	1	4	4
2014–15	Lausanne HC	NLA	39	3	3	6	8	7	0	1	1	4
2015–16	Lausanne HC	NLA	38	1	4	5	8	—	—	—	—	—
2016–17	Lausanne HC	NLA	42	3	5	8	12	2	0	0	0	0
2017–18	Dragons de Rouen	Ligue Magnus	31	12	22	34	20	—	—	—	—	—
2017–18	Lausanne HC	NL	15	3	5	8	8	—	—	—	—	—
2018–19	Lausanne HC	NL	50	3	4	7	8	12	2	0	2	12
2019–20	Lausanne HC	NL	36	3	0	3	2	—	—	—	—	—
2020–21	Lausanne HC	NL	24	0	0	0	18	6	0	0	0	0
2021–22	Genève-Servette HC	NL	37	3	2	5	8	2	0	0	0	0
2022–23	Genève-Servette HC	NL	49	3	5	8	14	17	0	0	0	2
NL (NLA) totals			400	26	31	57	112	68	6	3	9	24
