= Odeen Tufto =

American ice hockey player

- Tufto in 2026
- Born: January 9, 1997 (age 29) Chaska, Minnesota, US
- Height: 5 ft 7 in (170 cm)
- Weight: 174 lb (79 kg; 12 st 6 lb)
- Position: Center
- Shoots: Left
- DEL2 team Former teams: Ravensburg Towerstars; Syracuse Crunch; Krefeld Pinguine; EHC Olten
- NHL draft: Undrafted
- Playing career: 2021–present

Odeen Peter Tufto (born January 9, 1997) is an American professional ice hockey center who is currently playing with Ravensburg Towerstars of the DEL2. After spending four seasons with the Quinnipiac Bobcats men's ice hockey team, he signed an entry-level contract with the Tampa Bay Lightning for the 2021–22 season.

Growing up in Minnesota, Tufto attended Saint Thomas Academy where he was in the running for the Minnesota Mr. Hockey Award after recording 27 goals and 63 points in 27 games. Upon graduating, Tufto joined the Vernon Vipers of the British Columbia Hockey League and three United States Hockey League teams. While playing with the Vipers, Tufto committed to play collegiate ice hockey with the Quinnipiac Bobcats men's ice hockey team for the 2017–18 season.

Tufto played four seasons with the Bobcats, including one as team captain. He finished his collegiate career with the most assists in program history and third overall in Division I program history. He also accumulated 168 points ranking seventh of all-time. Once the Bobcats were eliminated from the playoffs in 2021, Tufto concluded his collegiate career by signing an entry-level contract with the Tampa Bay Lightning for the 2021–22 season.

== Early life ==
Tufto was born on January 9, 1997, in Chaska, Minnesota, to parents Kris and Nancy Tufto. His older brother Andy also played hockey and his father built them a backyard rink. As a result, Andy's friends would skate on the rink so Tufto would often play against older players. He originally figure skated but switched to hockey. Growing up, Tufto was a fan of the Minnesota Golden Gophers men's ice hockey team and attended three of their model camps. His favorite hockey player was Martin St. Louis.

== Playing career ==
Growing up in Minnesota, Tufto attended Saint Thomas Academy outside of Minneapolis where he was in the running for the Minnesota Mr. Hockey Award. He has recorded 27 goals and 63 points in 27 games as a senior, but lost the contest to Jake Jaremko. Following high school, Tufto joined the Vernon Vipers of the British Columbia Hockey League (BCHL).

During his only season with the Vipers, Tufto committed to play collegiate ice hockey with the Quinnipiac Bobcats men's ice hockey team for the 2017–18 season. While playing with the Vipers, he went by his middle name Peter before changing to Odeen in honor of his late grandfather. Tufto finished his season with the Vipers with 65 points in 57 games and was selected for the BCHL All-Rookie Team.

Following the 2016–17 season, he joined the Fargo Force of the United States Hockey League (USHL). Tufto played 30 games with the Force before being traded to the Tri-City Storm alongside Charlie Dovorany in exchange for Paul Washe and Philip Alftberg. Tufto joined the Sioux City Musketeers midway through the 2016–17 season after recording 20 points in 21 games to help Sioux City win the Anderson Cup. Throughout his tenure in the USHL, Tufto was moved from wing to center where he flourished offensively.

=== College ===
In September 2017, Tufto started his NCAA hockey career with the Quinnipiac Bobcats while majoring in finance. He entered college standing at 5 feet 7 inches (1.70 m) but was praised by Rand Pecknold for his high offensive IQ. Tufto began the season tallying a point in his first three games, making him the first player to achieve this feat since Chase Priskie in 2015–16. Later in October, he also became the first rookie since Ben Nelson in 2005 to score an overtime game-winner. He received praise from teammates as a possible replacement for Travis St. Denis and Sam Anas who had left the team two years prior. By February 2018, Tufto was one of 31 players in the country to reach 30 points and led all NCAA Division I freshmen in multiple-point games. As a result of his success, he was announced as one of 16 semifinalists for the Walter Brown Award as the best American-born NCAA Division I hockey player in New England. The following month, Tufto was named one of three finalists for the ECAC Hockey Rookie of the Year Award and selected for the Third-team All-ECAC.

Tufto returned to the Bobcats for his sophomore season and began playing center instead of his original position of left winger. Upon returning to the lineup, he recorded his first collegiate hat-trick in a 7–2 win over the Maine Black Bears. He had recorded all three of his goals during the first period and added two assists for a five-point game. As the season continued, Tufto became the first Quinnipiac player to record back-to-back 40-point seasons since 2007. He was tied for sixth in the league with 15 goals and third with 27 assists. Due to his sophomore success, Tufto was again named a semi-finalist for the Walter Brown Award and was named to the ECAC Hockey Second team. Tufto was also honored with a selection to the New England Hockey Writers' Association All-New England Division I All-Star Team and ECAC Hockey All-Academic Team for a second straight season.

During the offseason prior to his junior season, Tufto was invited to attend the National Hockey League's (NHL) Detroit Red Wings 2019 Development Camp. Upon returning to the Bobcats, Tufto accepted the position of assistant captain and named to the ECAC Hockey Second Team for a second straight season.

As a senior, Tufto finished his collegiate career with the most assists in program history, third in Division I program history, and seventh all-time with 168 points. While serving as team captain, Tufto recorded an eight-game point streak from October 19 to November 16 with nine points. At the conclusion of the season, Tufto was named the ECAC Hockey Player of the Year and AHCA First-Team All-American. He was later named to the All-College Hockey News Second Team, All-USCHO First Team, Senior CLASS Award Second Team All-American, and ECAC Hockey First Team.

=== Professional ===
Once the Bobcats were eliminated from the playoffs by Minnesota State on March 27, Tufto concluded his collegiate career by signing an entry-level contract with the Tampa Bay Lightning for the 2021–22 season, saying that "[w]e felt Tampa does a really good job of developing players." Following the signing, he was immediately assigned to their American Hockey League (AHL) affiliate, the Syracuse Crunch, on an amateur try-out contract. He made his professional debut with the Crunch on April 7 during an overtime win over the Rochester Americans. Tufto played three more games with the team, recording no goals or assists.

As a free agent from the Lightning, Tufto continued his career in the AHL after agreeing to a one-year contract with the Tucson Roadrunners, the primary affiliate to the Arizona Coyotes, on August 31, 2022. Tufto missed the beginning of the 2022–23 season through injury, and was re-assigned to the Atlanta Gladiators of the ECHL upon his return. Tufto made 12 appearances in the ECHL before he was recalled by the Roadrunners and later released without featuring for the club on January 21, 2023. For the remainder of the season, Tufto signed and appeared with second tier German club, Krefeld Pinguine in the DEL2.

Returning to North America in the off-season, Tufto was signed to a ECHL contract in joining the Iowa Heartlanders on July 14, 2023.

== Career statistics ==
			Regular season					Playoffs
Season	Team	League	GP	G	A	Pts	PIM	GP	G	A	Pts	PIM
2012–13	St. Thomas Academy	USHS	22	4	10	14	0	5	1	7	8	0
2013–14	St. Thomas Academy	USHS	24	16	27	43	21	3	1	1	2	0
2014–15	St. Thomas Academy	USHS	25	27	36	63	4	6	7	11	18	0
2015–16	Vernon Vipers	BCHL	57	25	40	65	22	5	3	0	3	4
2016–17	Fargo Force	USHL	30	5	16	21	4	—	—	—	—	—
2016–17	Tri-City Storm	USHL	8	3	4	7	2	—	—	—	—	—
2016–17	Sioux City Musketeers	USHL	21	8	12	20	0	13	6	5	11	2
2017–18	Quinnipiac University	ECAC	38	9	32	41	10	—	—	—	—	—
2018–19	Quinnipiac University	ECAC	38	15	27	42	16	—	—	—	—	—
2019–20	Quinnipiac University	ECAC	34	7	31	38	10	—	—	—	—	—
2020–21	Quinnipiac University	ECAC	29	8	39	47	22	—	—	—	—	—
2020–21	Syracuse Crunch	AHL	4	0	0	0	4	—	—	—	—	—
2021–22	Syracuse Crunch	AHL	4	0	0	0	0	—	—	—	—	—
2021–22	Orlando Solar Bears	ECHL	36	7	24	31	24	—	—	—	—	—
2022–23	Atlanta Gladiators	ECHL	12	3	4	7	12	—	—	—	—	—
2022–23	Krefeld Pinguine	DEL2	12	5	10	15	6	12	6	5	11	12
2023–24	Iowa Heartlanders	ECHL	29	3	19	22	22	—	—	—	—	—
2023–24	EHC Olten	SL	10	2	5	7	10	12	3	7	10	14
2024–25	Fort Wayne Komets	ECHL	36	12	26	38	18	5	1	2	3	4
2025–26	Fort Wayne Komets	ECHL	5	2	3	5	0	—	—	—	—	—
2025–26	Ravensburg Towerstars	DEL2	27	9	17	26	14	7	2	2	4	2
AHL totals			8	0	0	0	4	—	—	—	—	—

== Awards and honors ==
Award	Year	Ref
BCHL
BCHL All-Rookie Team	2016	
College
ECAC Hockey First Team	2021	
ECAC Hockey Player of the Year	2021	
Senior CLASS Award Second Team All-American	2021	
AHCA First-Team All-American	2021	
All-College Hockey News Second Team	2021	
All-USCHO First Team	2021	
Hobey Baker Award finalist	2021	
New England Division I All-Star	2019	
ECAC Hockey Third Team	2018	
ECAC Hockey Second team	2019	
ECAC Hockey Rookie of the Year Award Finalist	2018	

Awards and achievements
Preceded by Morgan Barron	ECAC Hockey Player of the Year; 2020–21	Succeeded by Yaniv Perets
