= Niklas Appelgren =

Finnish ice hockey defenceman

- Born: June 24, 1990 (age 35) Kouvola, Finland
- Height: 6 ft 2 in (188 cm)
- Weight: 201 lb (91 kg; 14 st 5 lb)
- Position: Winger
- Shoots: Left
- Liiga team Former teams: SaiPa; Sport; KooKoo; Porin Ässät
- Playing career: 2011–present

Niklas Appelgren (born June 24, 1990) is a Finnish professional ice hockey winger who currently represents Saimaan Pallo of the Liiga.

Appelgren previously played in Mestis for KooKoo and Hermes before making his Liiga debut for Sport during the 2016–17 season, playing two games during a loan spell from Hermes.

On April 13, 2017, Appelgren signed for Ässät. Appelgren played with Ässät for six years. Appelgren stopped playing for Ässät and became a free agent after the 2022–23 season. Appelgren signed a two-year deal with Saimaan Pallo.

Sporting positions
| Preceded by Tommi Taimi | Porin Ässät captain 2019–21 | Succeeded by Jarno Kärki |
