= Morgan Barron =

Canadian ice hockey player (born 1998)

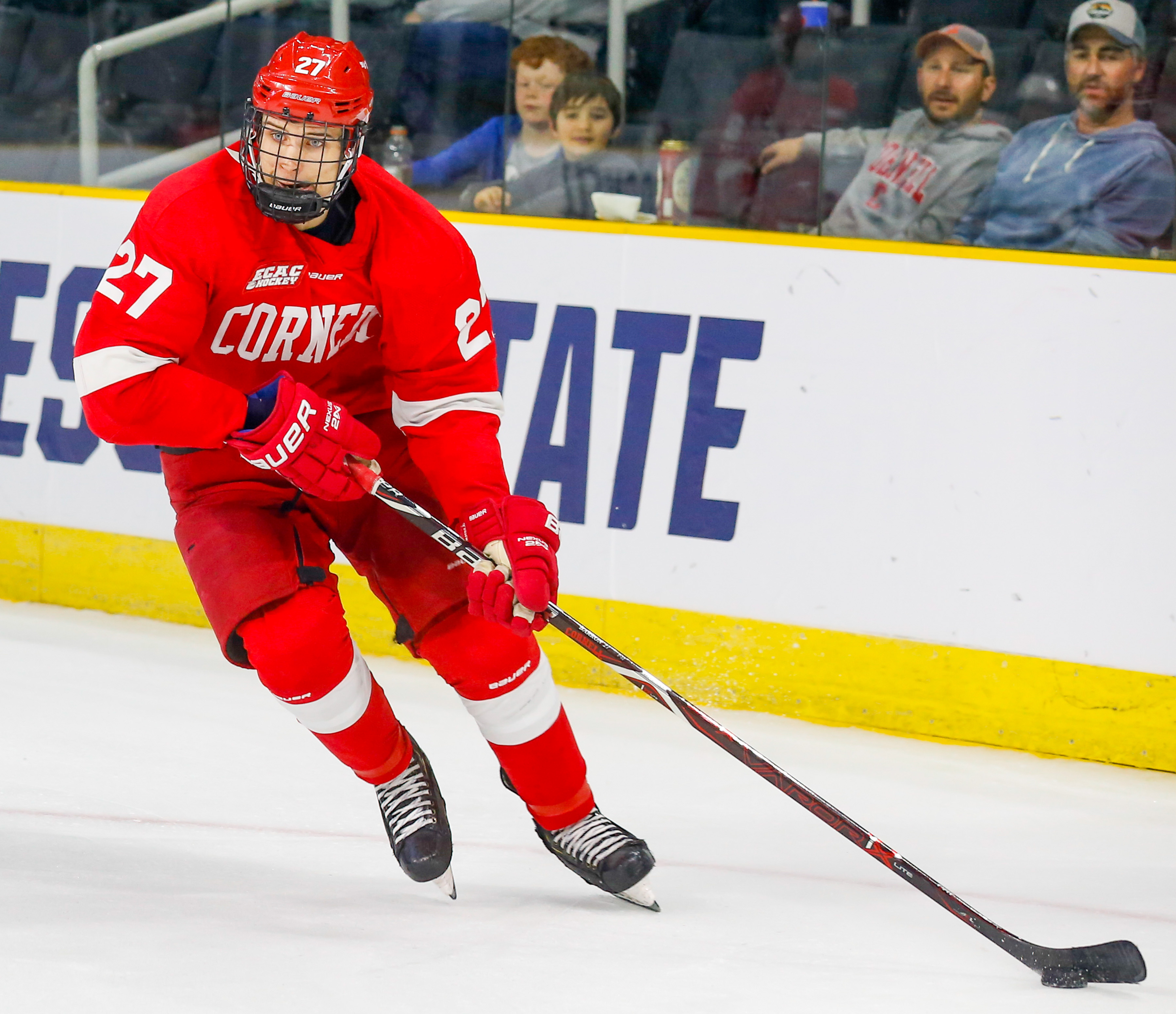
- Barron with Cornell in 2019
- Born: December 2, 1998 (age 27) Halifax, Nova Scotia, Canada
- Height: 6 ft 4 in (193 cm)
- Weight: 220 lb (100 kg; 15 st 10 lb)
- Position: Forward
- Shoots: Left
- NHL team Former teams: Winnipeg Jets; New York Rangers
- NHL draft: 174th overall, 2017; New York Rangers
- Playing career: 2021–present

Morgan Barron (born December 2, 1998) is a Canadian professional ice hockey player who is a forward for the Winnipeg Jets of the National Hockey League (NHL).

Born and raised in Nova Scotia, Barron played two seasons of minor ice hockey with the Newbridge Academy Gladiators of the Nova Scotia Major Midget Hockey League (NSMMHL) before enrolling at St. Andrew's College in Ontario. Upon graduating, he enrolled at Cornell University to play college ice hockey and was selected in the sixth round (174th overall) by the New York Rangers in the 2017 NHL entry draft.

Barron played three seasons with the Cornell Big Red before beginning his professional career with the Rangers. He received numerous accolades during his National Collegiate Athletic Association (NCAA) tenure, including an AHCA All-America, All-Ivy League, and All-ECAC Hockey First Team selection and was named ECAC Hockey Player of the Year for 2020.

== Early life ==
Barron was born on December 2, 1998, in Halifax, Nova Scotia to parents Gerard and Jenny Barron. His father works for Nova Scotia Power and his mother is a nurse. His younger brother Justin, also plays professional hockey whereas the duo often played street hockey with neighbourhood kids growing up. Barron grew up as a fan of all Toronto and New York sports teams.

== Playing career ==
=== Youth ===
Growing up in Nova Scotia, Barron played two seasons of minor ice hockey with the Newbridge Academy Gladiators of the Nova Scotia Major Midget Hockey League before enrolling at St. Andrew's College in Ontario. While with the Gladiators, Barron helped lead them to the Telus Cup by recording 42 points in 34 regular season games and 24 points in 16 playoff games. He was subsequently drafted by the Saint John Sea Dogs in the 2014 Quebec Major Junior Hockey League (QMJHL) draft. He had gone undrafted in his first year of eligibility but experienced a growth spurt during the summer and earned more attention from teams. Opting to return to the NSMMHL for the 2014–15 season, Barron helped the team defeat the Moncton Flyers 4–3 to win the 2015 Major Midget Atlantic Championships. He was invited to participate in the Sea Dogs' training camp but was cut from their roster on August 12, 2015.

Barron played three seasons of hockey and soccer for the St. Andrew's College Saints, serving as the team captain for their hockey team in his last two years. In 2016, as a Grade 11 student, Barron committed to playing NCAA Division 1 collegiate ice hockey at Cornell University. At the time of his commitment, he had recorded 28 goals, 18 assists, and 46 points over 40 games and maintained a 90% average in school. He had not been given an athletic scholarship to enroll at Cornell; head coach Mike Schafer explained that Barron came to Cornell anyway because "he wanted to combine that excellence in academics with a team where he felt he could get to the NHL and further his career." Standing at 6-foot-2, 200 pounds, Barron was often one of the bigger players on the ice as he recorded 34 goals and 60 points in 57 games. The following year, Barron was drafted 174th overall by the New York Rangers in the 2017 NHL entry draft after ranking 98th among North American skaters by the NHL Central Scouting Bureau. Barron described his style of play as a power forward who tries to "bring pucks to the net and protect pucks." While captaining the Saints hockey team, Barron also played soccer where he was named Most Valuable Player (MVP) at the CAIS National Soccer Championship. Barron also played five games in the United States Hockey League (USHL) with the Sioux City Musketeers.

=== Collegiate ===
Barron played for the Cornell Big Red men's ice hockey at Cornell University from 2017 until 2020 where he was enrolled in their College of Arts and Sciences program. He made his collegiate debut with the team on October 27, 2017, against the Alabama-Huntsville Chargers, recording one goal in 5–1 win. Barron continued his point streak in the next seven consecutive games, setting a new program record and ranking third in team scoring. Barron ended the season leading all Big Red players who were playing their first seasons in the league with 18 points and received the Greg Ratushny Award as the team's most promising rookie.

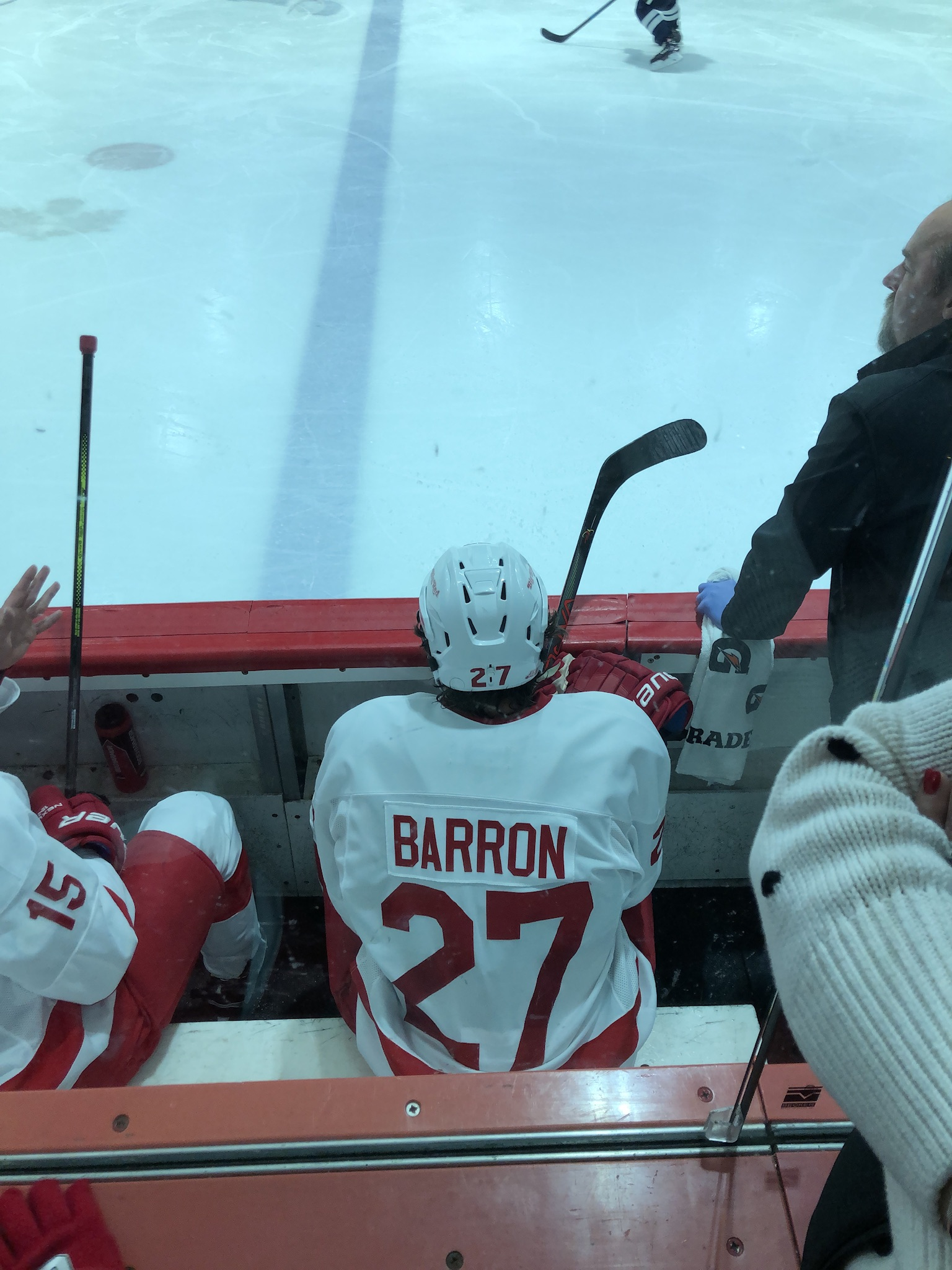
Barron during a game against Yale in November 2019

Prior to the start of his sophomore campaign, Barron attended the New York Rangers' development camp. He returned to the Red for the 2018–19 season where he was entrusted with more responsibility from coach Mike Schafer. He took face-offs with a 58.1 percent success rate and played on their penalty-killing unit. He ended the season leading the team with both 15 goals and 34 points. His point total was the highest in team history since the 2009–10 season. Barron was named ECAC Hockey Player of the Month for January after leading the league in scoring with 13 points in eight games. At the conclusion of the season, Barron was named to the All-ECAC Hockey first-team and All-Ivy League first team. His dominating season also earned him a finalist position for ECAC Hockey Best Defensive Forward and the team's Nicky Bawlf Award as MVP. During the offseason, he returned home to Halifax where he trained with fellow Nova Scotians Sidney Crosby, Nathan MacKinnon, and Brad Marchand.

As a result of his sophomore season, Barron was voted by ECAC Hockey coaches to the preseason all-league team prior to the 2019–20 season. In September, he was named one of three captains for the Red alongside seniors Yanni Kaldis and Jeff Malott. Barron started his first season as captain by recording his first collegiate hat trick in the opening frame of a 6–2 win over the Yale Bulldogs, earning him Player of the Week accolades. Although the 2019–20 season was cut short due to the COVID-19 pandemic, he recorded 32 points in 29 games as the team finished with a 23-2-4 record and first place in the Eastern College Athletic Conference. He thus set a new program record by becoming the first player to average more than a point per game in the shortened season. At the time of the pause, the Red were gearing up to play in their first Frozen Four since 2003 after winning nine straight games. Barron was subsequently named ECAC Hockey Player of the Year for 2020 and to the All-ECAC Hockey and All-Ivy League, and AHCA First-Team All-American first teams. When reflecting on his junior season, Barron admitted that he felt more confident in his ability to compete at the NHL level. He was also named one of 10 finalists for the Hobey Baker Memorial Award, given annually to the nation's top overall college hockey player, and selected for the 2019-2020 CoSIDA Academic All-America Division I Men's At-Large team.

=== Professional ===
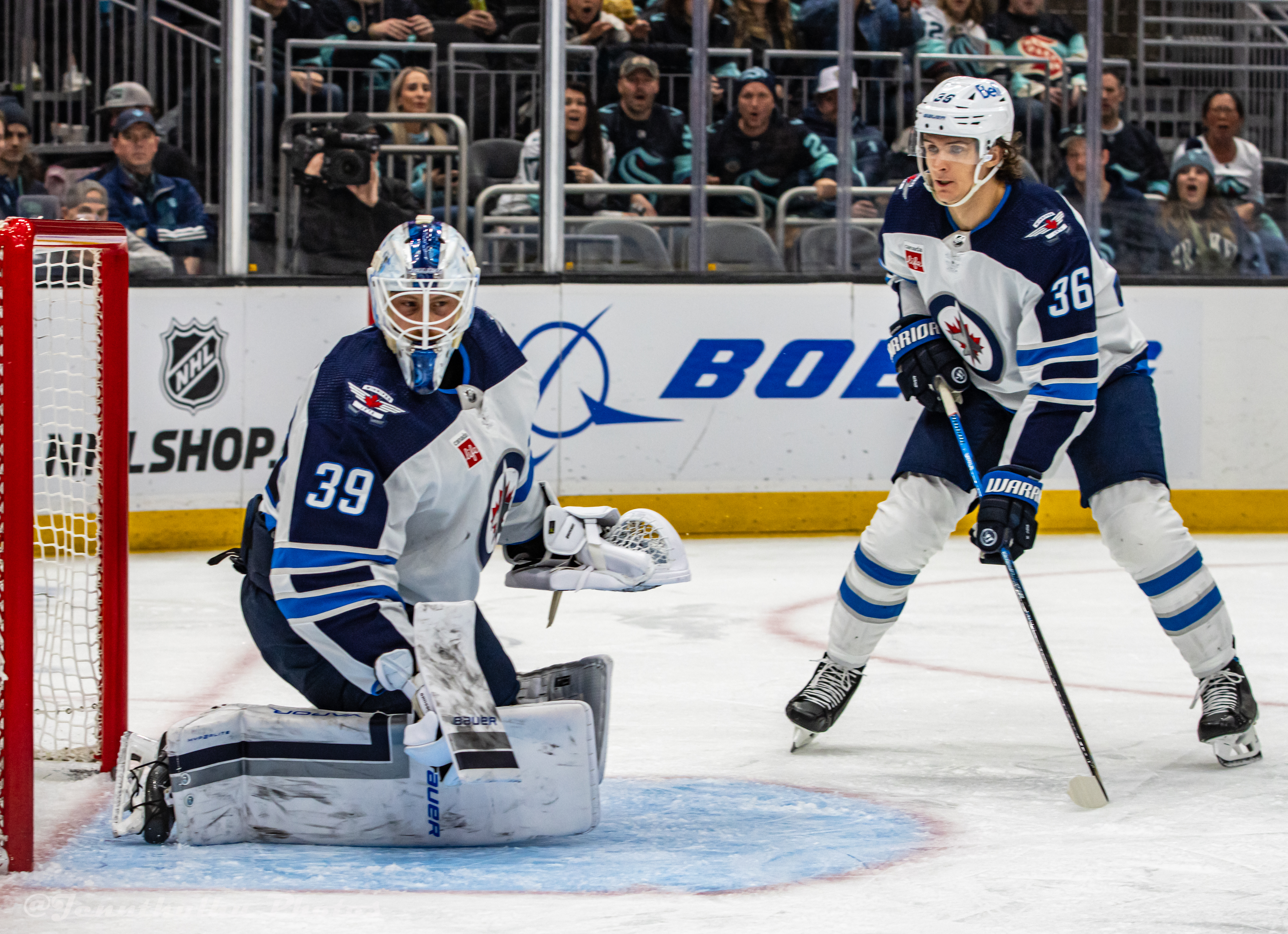
Barron (right) in action with the Winnipeg Jets in 2024.

Barron concluded his collegiate career by signing a three-year entry-level contract with the New York Rangers on July 31, 2020. He was unable to join the Rangers during their post-season competition as his contract began during the 2020–21 season but was expected to join the team for their 2020 training camp. After spending most of the 2020–21 with the Hartford Wolf Pack, Barron made his NHL debut for the Rangers on May 1, 2021, in a game against the New York Islanders. He scored his first career NHL goal four days later against the Washington Capitals.

Morgan was traded to the Winnipeg Jets at the trade deadline on March 21, 2022 along with a fifth round draft pick and 2 conditional second round draft picks in exchange for Andrew Copp and a sixth round draft pick.

During the first period of the Jets first game of the 2023 Stanley Cup playoffs, Barron fell onto Golden Knights goalie Laurent Brossoit's skate during a scrum in the crease, which led to 75 stitches above and to the side of his right eye. Barron returned to continue playing in the second period with a full cage on his helmet.

== Career statistics ==
			Regular season					Playoffs
Season	Team	League	GP	G	A	Pts	PIM	GP	G	A	Pts	PIM
2016–17	Sioux City Musketeers	USHL	5	0	0	0	0	—	—	—	—	—
2017–18	Cornell University	ECAC	33	5	13	18	31	—	—	—	—	—
2018–19	Cornell University	ECAC	36	15	19	34	26	—	—	—	—	—
2019–20	Cornell University	ECAC	29	14	18	32	24	—	—	—	—	—
2020–21	Hartford Wolf Pack	AHL	21	10	11	21	20	—	—	—	—	—
2020–21	New York Rangers	NHL	5	1	0	1	2	—	—	—	—	—
2021–22	Hartford Wolf Pack	AHL	25	9	6	15	10	—	—	—	—	—
2021–22	New York Rangers	NHL	13	0	1	1	4	—	—	—	—	—
2021–22	Manitoba Moose	AHL	5	1	1	2	0	5	4	2	6	2
2021–22	Winnipeg Jets	NHL	14	2	2	4	4	—	—	—	—	—
2022–23	Winnipeg Jets	NHL	70	8	13	21	31	5	0	0	0	2
2023–24	Winnipeg Jets	NHL	80	11	7	18	23	—	—	—	—	—
2024–25	Winnipeg Jets	NHL	74	8	7	15	16	13	0	2	2	2
2025–26	Winnipeg Jets	NHL	65	11	12	23	31	—	—	—	—	—
NHL totals			321	41	42	83	111	18	0	2	2	4

Awards and achievements
Preceded by Adam Fox	ECAC Hockey Player of the Year; 2019–20	Succeeded by Odeen Tufto
