= 2024–25 Swiss League season =

- League: Swiss League
- Sport: Ice hockey
- Number of games: 225
- Number of teams: 10

Regular Season
- Season Champions: EHC Basel
- Top scorer: Jakob Stukel

Playoffs

Swiss League champion
- Champions: EHC Visp
- Runners-up: EHC Basel

Swiss League seasons
- ← 2023–24 2025–26 →

The 2024–25 Swiss League season was the 78th season of Switzerland's second tier hockey league.

== Teams ==
Swiss League teams for the 2023–24 season

The teams changed form the 2023-24 season with the promotion of EHC Chur, while HCV Martigny was voluntarily relegated for financial reasons.

| Team | City | Arena | Capacity |
|---|---|---|---|
| EHC Basel | Basel | St. Jakob Arena | 6,700 |
| HC La Chaux-de-Fonds | La Chaux-de-Fonds | Patinoire des Mélèzes | 5,800 |
| GCK Lions | Küsnacht | Eishalle Küsnacht | 2,200 |
| EHC Chur | Chur | Thomas Domenig Stadion | 6,545 |
| EHC Olten | Olten | Kleinholz Stadion | 6,500 |
| HC Sierre | Sierre | Patinoire de Graben | 4,500 |
| HC Thurgau | Weinfelden | Güttingersreuti | 3,100 |
| HCB Ticino Rockets | Bellinzona | Centro Sportivo | 2,180 |
| EHC Visp | Visp | Lonza Arena | 5,500 |
| EHC Winterthur | Winterthur | Zielbau Arena | 3,000 |

== Regular season ==
| Pos | Team | Pld | W | OTW | OTL | L | GF | GA | GD | Pts | Qualification |
|---|---|---|---|---|---|---|---|---|---|---|---|
| 1 | EHC Basel | 45 | 30 | 3 | 1 | 11 | 151 | 93 | +58 | 97 | Advance to Playoffs |
| 2 | HC La Chaux-de-Fonds | 45 | 29 | 4 | 0 | 12 | 163 | 102 | +61 | 95 | Advance to Playoffs |
| 3 | Hockey Thurgau | 45 | 23 | 4 | 3 | 15 | 144 | 110 | +34 | 80 | Advance to Playoffs |
| 4 | EHC Visp | 45 | 19 | 4 | 9 | 13 | 121 | 107 | +14 | 74 | Advance to Playoffs |
| 5 | HC Sierre | 45 | 20 | 4 | 4 | 17 | 157 | 141 | +16 | 72 | Advance to Playoffs |
| 6 | EHC Chur | 45 | 15 | 6 | 7 | 17 | 123 | 143 | −20 | 64 | Advance to Playoffs |
| 7 | EHC Olten | 45 | 17 | 4 | 4 | 20 | 128 | 138 | −10 | 63 | Advance to Playoffs |
| 8 | GCK Lions | 45 | 18 | 0 | 2 | 25 | 104 | 127 | −23 | 56 | Advance to Playoffs |
| 9 | EHC Winterthur | 45 | 13 | 5 | 3 | 24 | 101 | 132 | −31 | 52 | |
| 10 | HCB Ticino Rockets | 45 | 6 | 1 | 2 | 36 | 80 | 179 | −99 | 22 | |

Rules for classification: 1) points; 2) a higher number of wins in the regular time; 3) a higher number of wins in overtime and shootouts; 4) goal difference; 5) number of goals scored; 6) drawing of lots.

== Playoffs ==
=== Bracket ===
Quarter-Finals
1 | EHC Basel | 4
8 | GCK Lions | 1
2 | HC La Chaux-de-Fonds | 2
7 | EHC Olten | 4
(Pairings are reseeded after the first round)
3 | HC Thurgau | 4
6 | EHC Chur | 0
4 | EHC Visp | 4
5 | HC Sierre | 1

Semi-Finals
1 | EHC Basel | 4
7 | EHC Olten | 3
3 | HC Thurgau | 0
4 | EHC Visp | 4

Finals
1 | EHC Basel | 1
4 | EHC Visp | 4

By winning the Swiss League, EHC Visp qualified to play for promotion to the National League. They faced HC Ajoie, the losers of the 2024-25 National League season in the Playouts. HC Ajoie won the series 4-1, remaining in the NL.
