= Sebastian Selin =

Swedish ice hockey player

- Born: February 9, 1992 (age 33) Skellefteå, Sweden
- Height: 6 ft 2 in (188 cm)
- Weight: 190 lb (86 kg; 13 st 8 lb)
- Position: Right wing
- Shoots: Right
- Eliteserien team Former teams: Sparta Warriors; Skellefteå AIK
- Playing career: 2012–present

Sebastian Selin (born February 9, 1992) is a Swedish professional ice hockey forward. He is currently playing under contract with Sparta Warriors of the Eliteserien.

Selin made his Elitserien debut playing with Skellefteå AIK during the 2012–13 Elitserien season.
