= Éric Castonguay =

Canadian ice hockey player (born 1987)

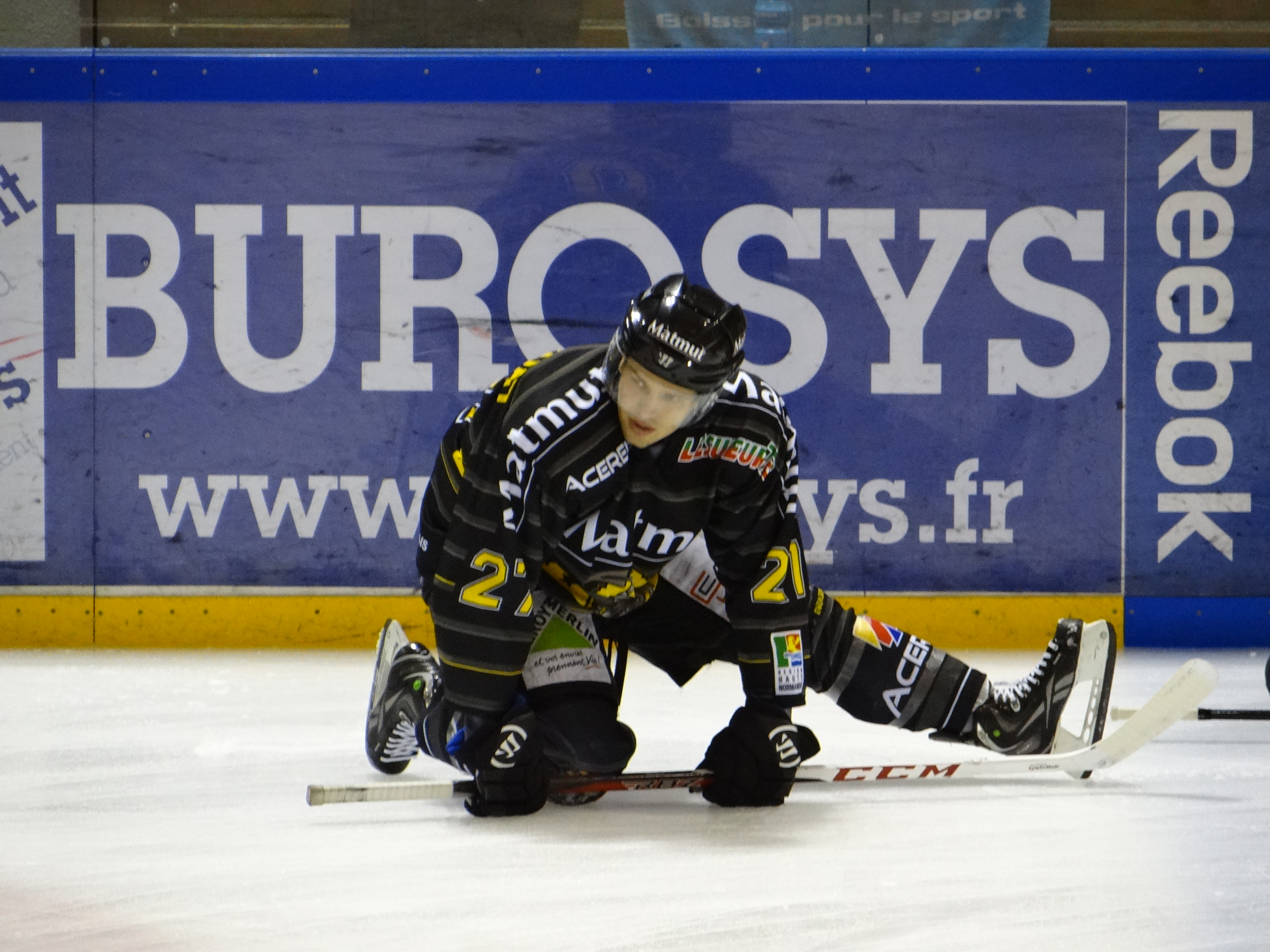
- Castonguay with Dragons de Rouen in 2012
- Born: September 18, 1987 (age 37); Granby, Quebec, Canada
- Height: 5 ft 11 in (180 cm)
- Weight: 174 lb (79 kg; 12 st 6 lb)
- Position: Forward
- Shot: Left
- Played for: Lowell Devils; Bridgeport Sound Tigers; Diables Rouges de Briançon; Dragons de Rouen; Chicago Wolves; Frisk Asker; Leksands IF; HC Sierre
- NHL draft: Undrafted
- Playing career: 2007–2024

Éric Castonguay (born September 18, 1987) is a Canadian ice hockey coach and former professional player. He is currently an assistant coach for HC Sierre in the Swiss League (SL).

== Playing career ==
Castonguay's Midget AAA career included time with Collège Antoine-Girouard, followed by 3 seasons with the Lewiston Maineiacs of the Quebec Major Junior Hockey League for his Major Junior Ice Hockey career.

After completing his Midget AAA and Major Junior Ice Hockey careers, he began his professional Ice Hockey career starting with the 2007-08 season. He has played professionally for the Trenton Devils and Reading Royals of the ECHL. On June 2, 2011, the Reading Royals of the ECHL announced that they had included Castonguay on their protected list. He has also played professionally for the Lowell Devils and Bridgeport Sound Tigers of the American Hockey League and Dragons de Rouen and Diables Rouges de Briançon, both of the French Ligue Magnus.

On September 21, 2013, Castonguay signed with the Missouri Mavericks of the Central Hockey League for the 2013–14 season. During that season, in a game against the Quad City Mallards on March 23, 2014, Castonguay set a Mavericks single-season franchise record of 31 Goals, which itself would ultimately be broken later that same season by Andrew Courtney, who ended the season with 34 Goals. That same season, in the Central Hockey League 2013-14 Season "Best of The Best" Poll, he came in 2nd place in the poll for Most Gentlemanly Player. On April 18, 2014, Castonguay was loaned to the Chicago Wolves of the American Hockey League.

On May 17, 2014, Castonguay signed with Frisk Asker Ishockey of the Norwegian GET-ligaen. In 2017, Castonguay signed a contract with AIK IF in HockeyAllsvenskan. After having a productive season where he ranked third in the league for scoring, Castonguay signed an extension with the team.

== Coaching career ==
Castonguay retired from playing after the 2023–24 season, then was named an assistant coach for HC Sierre for the 2024–25 season, and as a coach for the club's junior teams. He worked alongside his father-in-law Mario Pouliot as the head coach, who had coached him in the previous season, and as a 16-year-old with the Collège Antoine-Girouard Gaulois.
