= Jarno Kärki =

Finnish ice hockey player

- Kärki in 2026
- Born: October 13, 1994 (age 31) Pori, Finland
- Height: 6 ft 4 in (193 cm)
- Weight: 203 lb (92 kg; 14 st 7 lb)
- Position: Forward
- Shoots: Left
- NL team Former teams: ZSC Lions; Ässät; Tappara; EHC Biel; Färjestad BK; Linköping HC
- Playing career: 2014–present

Jarno Henrik Kärki (born October 13, 1994) is a Finnish professional ice hockey forward currently under contract with ZSC Lions of the National League (NL).

Kärki made his Liiga debut playing with Ässät during the 2014–15 Liiga season.

Sporting positions
Preceded by Niklas Appelgren	Porin Ässät captain 2021–22	Succeeded by Jesse Joensuu
