= EHC Visp =

- Nickname: Löwen (The Lions)
- City: Visp, Switzerland
- League: Swiss League
- Founded: 1939
- Home arena: Lonza Arena
- Colors
- General manager: Sébastien Pico
- Head coach: Heinz Ehlers
- Affiliates: SC Bern
- Website: ehc-visp.ch

Franchise history
- 1939–present: EHC Visp

EHC Visp is a Swiss professional ice hockey team based in Visp and competing in the Swiss League (SL). The club was founded in 1939 and became Swiss champion in 1962. Visp has also won the league title in NLB three times; 1960, 2011 and 2014.

Their home arena is the 5,150-seat Lonza Arena.

== History ==
EHC Visp was founded in 1939 and rose up the professional ranks to the National League A in the 1959–60 season. Visp would establish itself there for more than 10 years with the highlight capturing the Swiss championship title in the 1961–62 season on 3 February 1962, winning 3–0 against HC Davos. In 1964 EHC Visp won the Swiss Cup. 3-0 - but this championship title was not repeated. In 1964, EHC Visp also won the Swiss Cup. Bibi Torriani was the head coach of EHC Visp from 1960 until 1965.

After placing 4th in the regular season, EHC Visp went on to win the 2024-25 Swiss League. They lost the promotion series to qualify to the National League against HC Ajoie.

== Honors ==
Swiss Championships: (1) 1962
National League B Championships: (4) 1960, 2011, 2014, 2025
Swiss Cup: (1) 1964
