= Mathieu Vouillamoz =

Swiss ice hockey player

- Born: 3 April 2000 (age 24); Isérables, Switzerland
- Height: 6 ft 1 in (185 cm)
- Weight: 185 lb (84 kg; 13 st 3 lb)
- Position: Left Wing
- Shoots: Left
- NL team: Genève-Servette HC
- Playing career: 2019–present

Mathieu Vouillamoz (born 3 April 2000) is a Swiss professional ice hockey left winger who is currently playing with Genève-Servette HC of the National League (NL).

== Playing career ==
Vouillamoz, a Valais native, moved to Geneva at 15 to join Genève-Servette HC junior teams, playing with their U17 team for a season and then with their U20 team for 2 seasons. He won 2 Elite Junior A championship titles back-to-back with Geneva in 2017-18 and 2018-19.

Vouillamoz began the 2019-20 season on the U20 team before signing his first professional contract with Genève-Servette HC on 26 November 2019, agreeing to a 2-year deal. On 6 December 2019 Vouillamoz made his National League debut with Genève-Servette HC in a home game against EHC Biel, his only NL game of the season. He spent the majority of this season on loan with HC Sierre of the Swiss League, dressing up in 41 regular season games (8 points) and 4 additional games in the relegation round before the season was cut short due to the Coronavirus pandemic.

Vouillamoz scored his first NL goal on 20 March 2021 against Ivars Punnenovs of the SCL Tigers in a 4-3 OT win.

On 9 August 2021 Vouillamoz agreed to an early two-year contract extension with Servette through the end of the 2023-24 season.

== International play ==
Vouillamoz represented Switzerland at the 2018 IIHF World U18 Championships.
