= Yvan Vouillamoz =

Swiss ski jumper (born 1969)

Personal information
- Full name: Yvan Vouillamoz
- Born: 18 June 1969 (age 57) Le Brassus, Switzerland

Sport
- Sport: Skiing

World Cup career
- Seasons: 1989–1993
- Indiv. podiums: 1 Team
- Updated on 30 Mar 2015

Yvan Vouillamoz (born 18 June 1969) is a Swiss former ski jumper.
