= Eliot Antonietti =

Swiss professional ice hockey defenceman

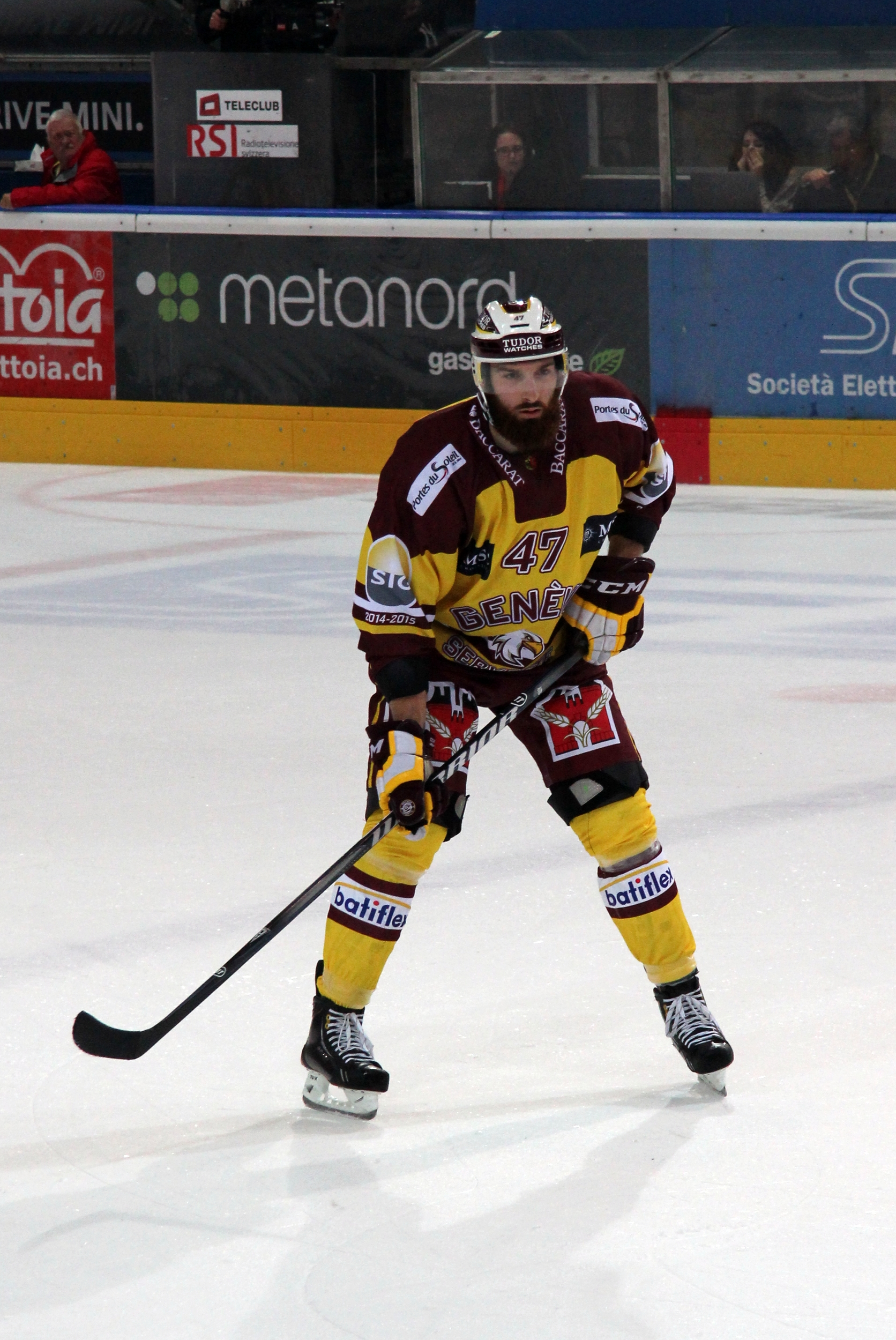
- Born: January 27, 1993 (age 33) Orbe, Switzerland
- Height: 6 ft 6 in (198 cm)
- Weight: 240 lb (109 kg; 17 st 2 lb)
- Position: Defense
- Shoots: Right
- SL team Former teams: EHC Olten; Genève-Servette HC; HC Lugano
- Playing career: 2011–present

Eliot Antonietti (born January 27, 1993) is a Swiss professional ice hockey defenseman who is currently playing with EHC Olten of the Swiss League (SL). He previously played with HC Lugano and Genève-Servette HC of the NL and on loan with the SC Rapperswil-Jona Lakers and HC Ajoie.

== Playing career ==
Antonietti made his National League debut playing with Genève-Servette HC during the 2010–11 NLA season.

Antonietti began the 2017–18 season with HC Ajoie of the Swiss League (SL), as he failed to make the National League team, he scored 1 goal in 10 games before joining Geneva for 2 games. He sustained a lower-body injury in November 2017 and was put on the trade block by Geneva to get rid of his remaining CHF 650K salary. Antonietti unexpectedly agreed to a two-year contract extension with Geneva on 27 July 2018. He appeared in only 23 NL games the following season, putting up 1 assist.

Antonietti began the 2019–20 season as a healthy scratch with Geneva before being loaned to the SC Rapperswil-Jona Lakers on October 9, 2019. On November 13, 2019, the Lakers released Antonietti after he played 5 games (0 points) with the team. He subsequently returned to Geneva as a healthy scratch. Antonietti left Geneva after the shortened 2019–20 season.

On June 15, 2020, Antonietti was offered a professional try-out contract by HC Lugano to attend training camp in August 2020. He was immediately loaned to Lugano's affiliate, the Ticino Rockets, to play preseason games. On September 16, 2020, Antonietti was signed to a one-year two-way contract by HC Lugano.

On June 10, 2021, Antonietti agreed to a two-year deal with EHC Olten of the SL.

== Personal life ==
He is the younger brother of Genève-Servette HC forward Benjamin Antonietti.
