= HC Sierre =

- City: Sierre, Switzerland
- League: Swiss League
- Founded: 1933
- Home arena: Patinoire de Graben
- Colours
- General manager: Alain Bonnet
- Head coach: Chris McSorley
- Affiliates: Genève-Servette HC
- Website: hcsierre.ch

Franchise history
- 1933–2003: HC Sierre
- 2003–2011: HC Sierre-Anniviers
- 2011–present: HC Sierre

HC Sierre is a professional ice hockey team, in Switzerland currently playing in the Swiss League (SL). Sierre has played in each of the top Swiss hockey leagues the National League (NL) and Swiss League (SL). It has also played several years in the lower tiers of the ice hockey leagues system in Switzerland. Sierre the affiliate to National League club Genève-Servette HC, agreeing to a four-year partnership through 2022.

After claiming the MySports League (MSL) Championship, formerly the Regio league, with a victory over HC Valais-Chablais in the 2018–19 season, HC Sierre was promoted to return to the Swiss League on 30 March 2019.

== Honors ==
Swiss League Championships: (2) 1967, 1968, 2026
MySports League Championship:(1) 2019

== Notable players ==
- Éric Castonguay

== Notable coaches ==
- Yves Sarault
- Mario Pouliot, (2023–24 and 2024–25 seasons)
