= History of Porin Ässät (men's ice hockey) =

Finish hockey club history

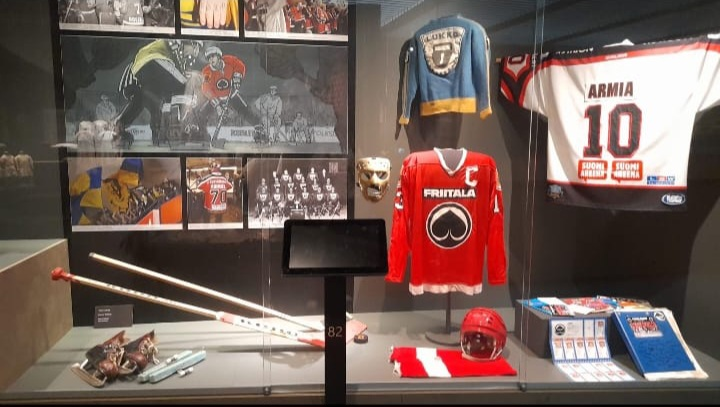
A display of Porin Ässät and Rauman Lukko gear at the Satakunta Museum in Pori.

The history of the Porin Ässät starts in 1925, when Porin Palloilijat was established, even though PoPa is often considered as a separate club from Ässät.

In 1932, Porin Kärpät was established and six years later RU-38 started operations in sports. PoPa and Kärpät merged in 1960 to become the Porin Karhut. Only seven years after the establishment of Karhut, it merged with RU-38 to become Ässät.

Karhut won the Finnish Championship of ice hockey in 1965. RU-38 won it two years later in 1967. Ässät claims neither of said championships.

Ässät themselves have won three championships in ice hockey and one Finnish Cup.

== 1925–1967: Before the establishment ==
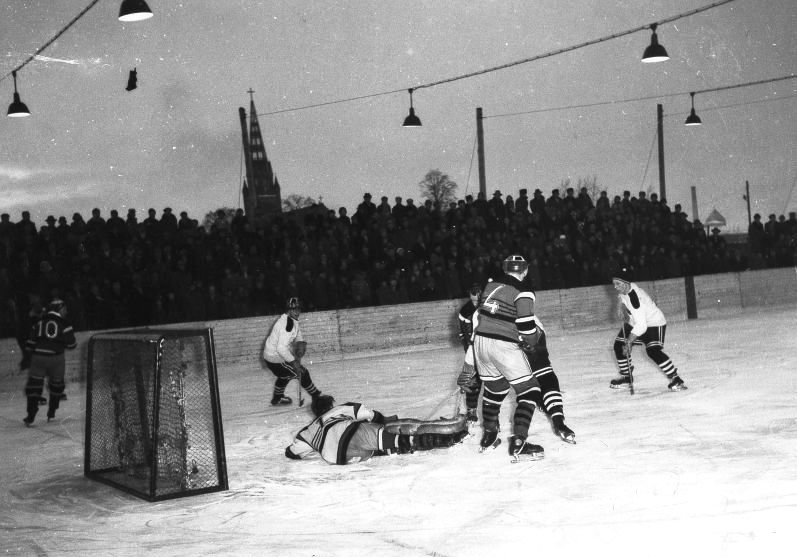
Porin Kärpät (dark jerseys) playing against HC TPS (white jerseys) circa 1950s–60s

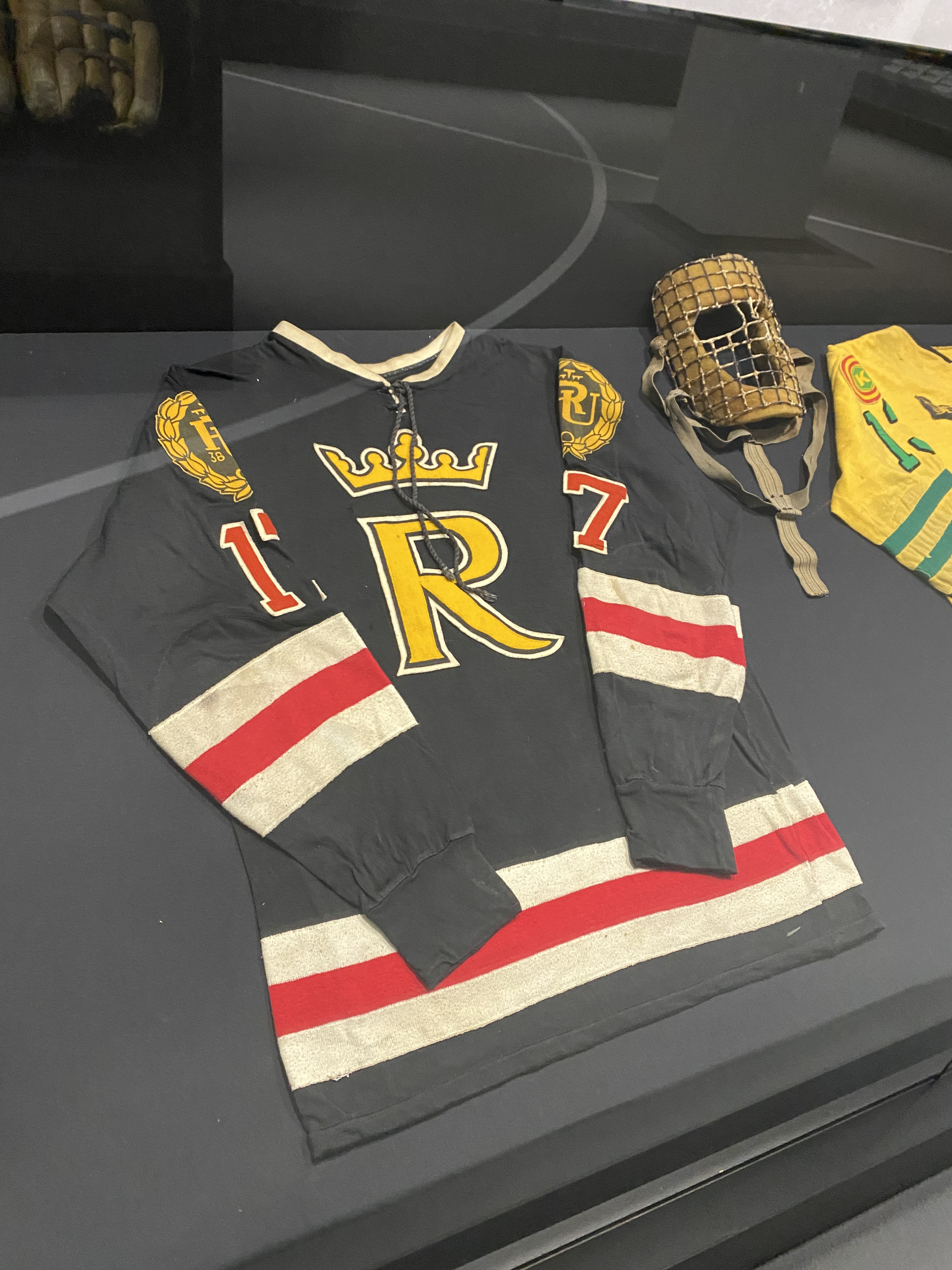
RU-38 jersey at display in the Finnish Hockey Museum.

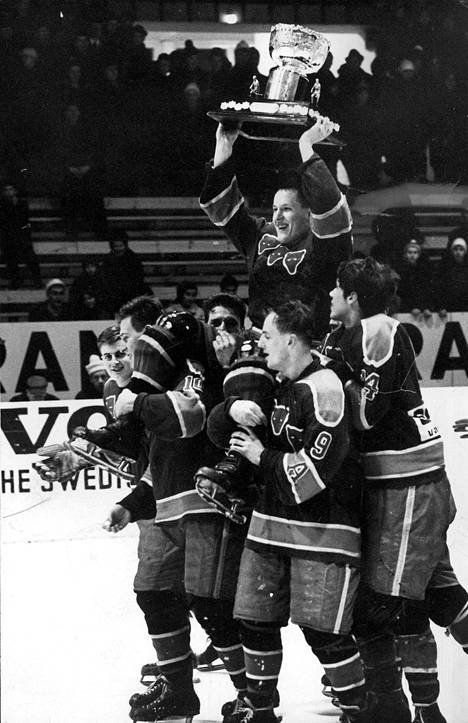
Karhut celebrating their 1965 championship

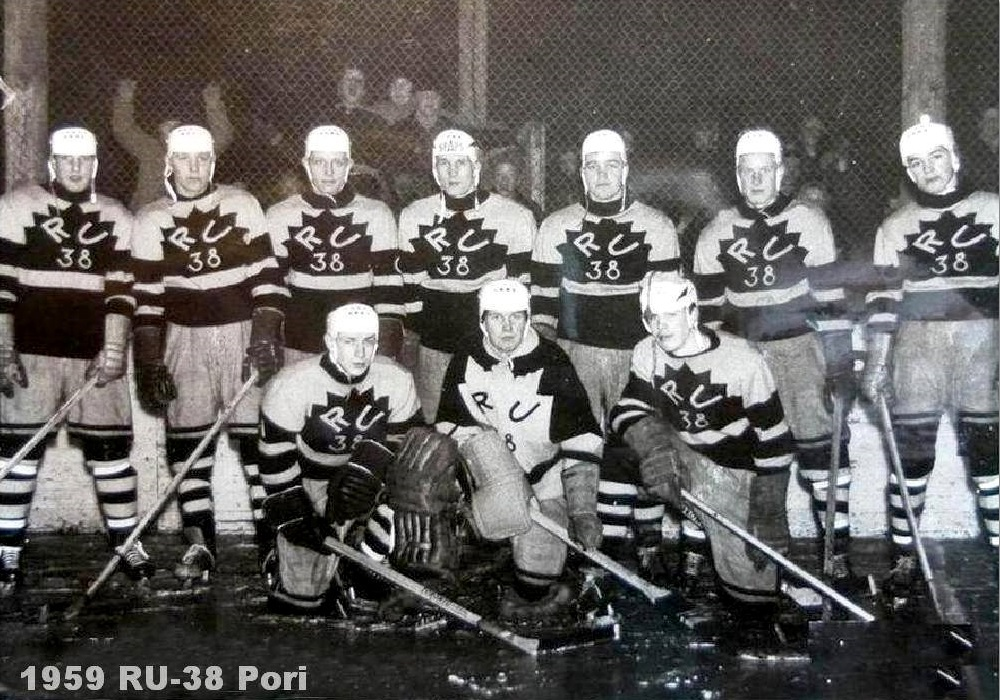
RU-38 players in 1959

Ässät's history in ice hockey can be traced back to the 1950s, when Porin Kärpät played their first official match in the Maakuntasarja. Ässät's history in other sports can be traced back to 1925, when PoPa was established.

RU-38 was established in 1938 by Oy W. Rosenlew Ab.

In 1960, PoPa and Kärpät merged to form Porin Karhut. Both Kärpät and PoPa were re-established as independent clubs years after the merger. PoPa did not have any ice hockey programs and only played football and basketball. Kärpät also had bandy in its programme.

In the early 1960s, two clubs from Pori joined the SM-sarja: Karhut and RU-38. Both quickly rose to the top of the league and achieved success in the SM-sarja. Karhut won the Finnish championship in 1965, followed by RU-38 two years later in 1967. There was fierce competition between the two clubs both on and off the ice. The town was divided into the Karhut and RU-38 fan clubs; the Karhut were more popular because the majority of the people considered it the city's own club. The RU-38, on the other hand, was considered a Rosenlew factories-funded team, but it still had its own supporters. The relations between the clubs were not very good.

== Establishment of Ässät (1967) ==
Although the RU-38 won the Finnish championship in 1967, the Rosenlew company seriously considered giving up sports activities, as Rosenlew felt that hockey did not bring enough positive publicity to the company. The leaders of Karhut and RU-38 negotiated the unification of the clubs during the spring and early summer so secretly that even the insiders of the teams did not get to know about the merger negotiations. The problem for the Karhut was the economic downturn, as the club had heavily invested in player acquisitions. The income was not enough to cover the expenses, especially after some supporters had moved to the Rosenlew club.

As Rosenlew was abandoning the sports club, it was suggested that the RU-38 was simply "melted" into Karhut. When an agreement was finally reached, Rosenlew took over a large portion of Karhut's debts and promised to support the new team financially in the early years. The new club was named Porin Ässät. The birth of the club was announced at the end of June 1967. The name of the club was given by Vilho Santala, who acted as a negotiator in uniting the clubs and was elected the first chairman of Ässät. The club's logo was designed by Vesa Antikainen. The colors of the club were chosen as red, black and white.

In addition to hockey, the Ässät football team inherited RU-38's place in the Mestaruussarja, while Karhut continued to play as Ässät's secondary team until 1968. Ässät's football club was later disestablished in 1981.

== 1967–1970: First seasons ==
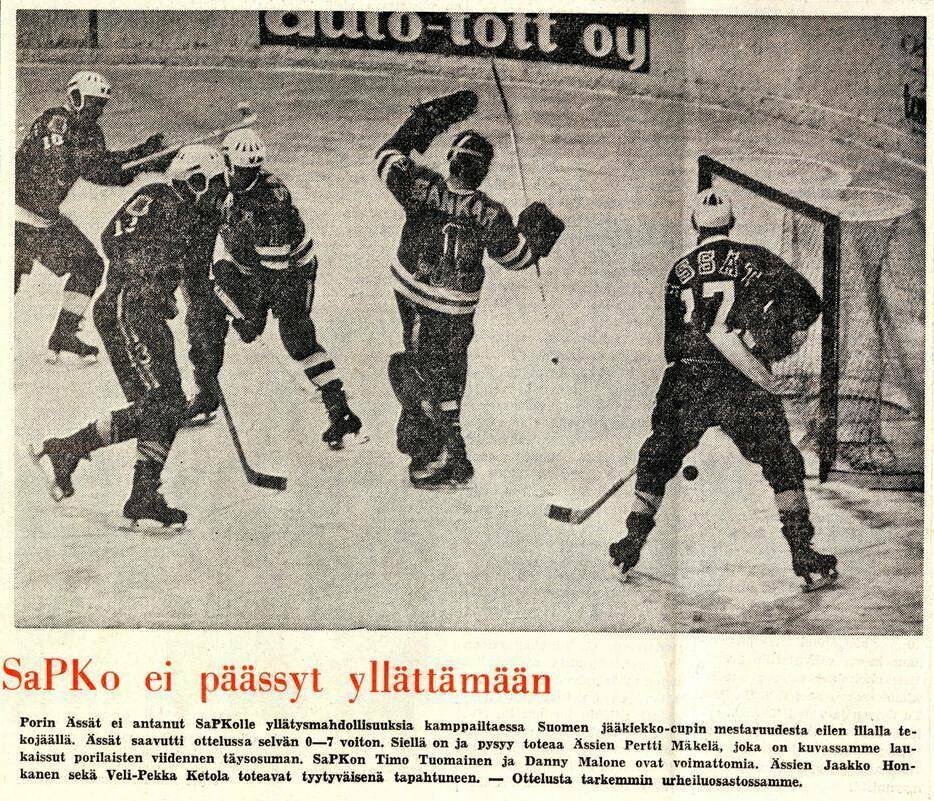
Ässät vs SaPKo in the Finnish Cup 1967. Ässät beat SaPKo 7–0

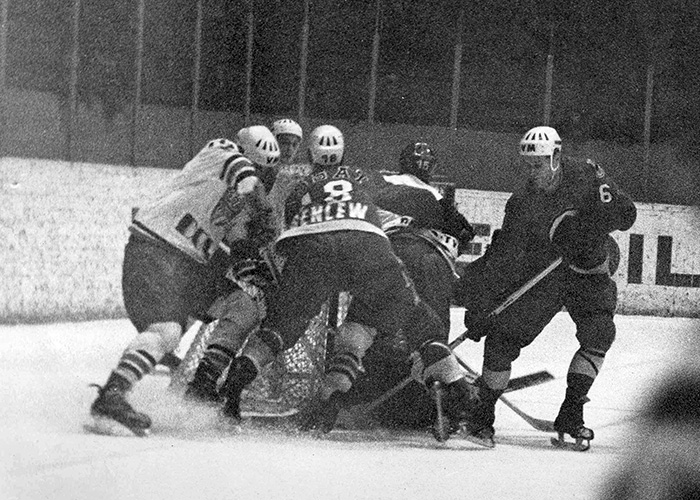
Ässät and Tappara players fighting for the puck next to the net

The early days of Ässät did not go smoothly, with Karhut and RU-38 players on the same team creating a heated atmosphere. The merger of the two top clubs also raised hopes of a very strong team, but one line of national team-level players joined different teams, and the players who left were mainly RU-38 players from the previous season. The first team of Ässät thus consisted mainly of Karhut players.

The first games of Ässät went well, and even before the start of the 1967 SM-sarja season, Ässät won the Suomen Cup championship. In the final match played in Savonlinna, SaPKo collapsed. Thanks to inheriting the RU-38 championship, Ässät also played in the 1968 European Cup, where it won its first two rounds before being beaten by SC Dynamo Berlin in the quarter-finals.

In its first season in the 1967–68 SM-sarja, Ässät placed fourth with Rauli Virtanen's coaching. The new club did not receive unreserved support from the people of Pori, as the number of spectators decreased by 10,000 from the last season of Karhut. In the second season of Ässät attendance started to rise, with the numbers rising to the same level as Karhut had. Lasse Heikkilä, the former coach of Karhut, became the coach for the second season and served as the team's coach until 1974 and later in 1976–1981. In the 1968–69 season, Ässät were again fourth. For the following season, 1969–70, Ässät suffered two heavy losses when Veli-Pekka Ketola and Alpo Suhonen left for Jokerit for a year. Ässät finished sixth in the series.

== 1970–1971: First national championship ==
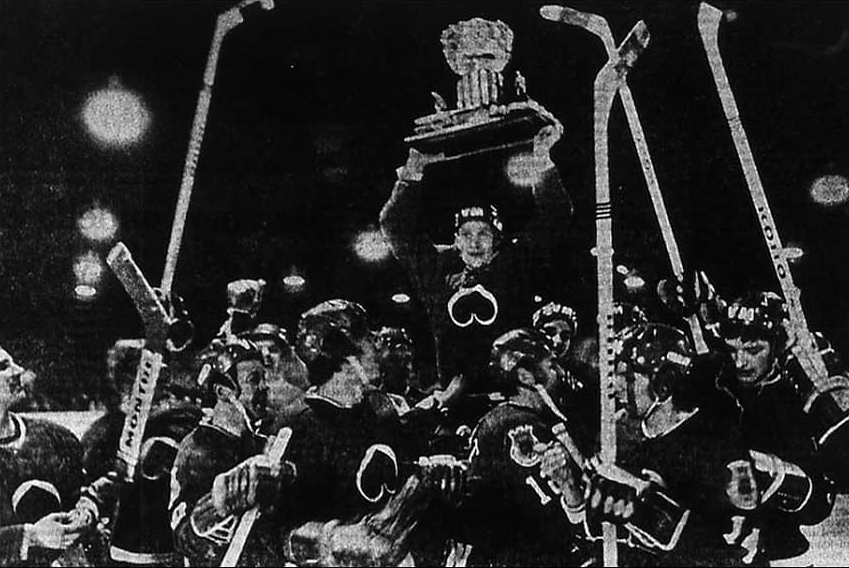
Ässät celebrating the 1971 championship

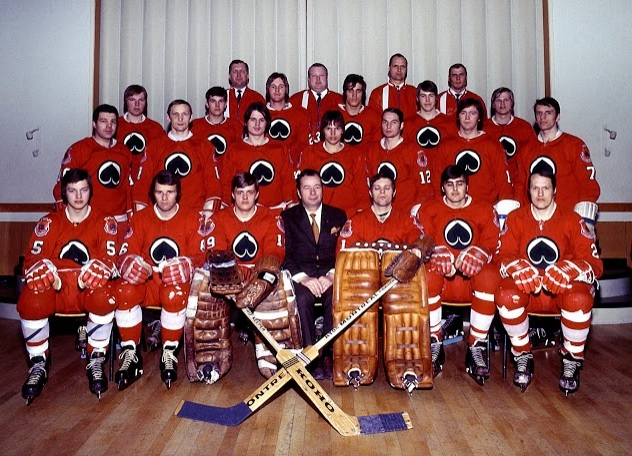
Ässät group photo from the 1970–71 SM-sarja season.

For the season 1970–71, Ässät got a high-class returnee from Helsinki when Veli-Pekka Ketola returned to Pori after playing for one season in Jokerit. Alpo Suhonen also returned to Ässät after Ketola. Ketola's return to his home club gave rise to a huge training enthusiasm in other players as well, and coach Lasse Heikkilä took the team on a training trip to Moscow before the start of the season. The trip to the Soviet Union started training very early, by the standards of the time, because there was no ice on Pori in early autumn. In the 1970–71 season Ässät finished third in the regular season after Jokerit and HIFK. In the final series, everything fell into place, Ässät lost only one of their ten matches and overtook the Helsinki clubs ahead. The gold medals were finally secured by a five-point difference to the Jokerit who came in second. The first championship came under the leadership of the forward trio Erkki Väkiparta - Veli-Pekka Ketola - Tapio Koskinen. Other lines behind No. 1 were also able to provide to the team. There were also big names in the defense, such as Antti Heikkilä and Pekka Rautakallio. Veli-pekka Ketola was the highest point scorer in the SM-sarja during the 1970–71 season with 42 points, of which 25 were goals and 17 were assists. Ässät's captain during the season was Raimo Kilpiö. Ässät's number one goalie was Jorma Valtonen who played every game of the season. Valtonen finished the season with a .922 save percentage. (Note: This includes only games from the final series, because the regular season games were not counted.)

== 1971–1977 ==
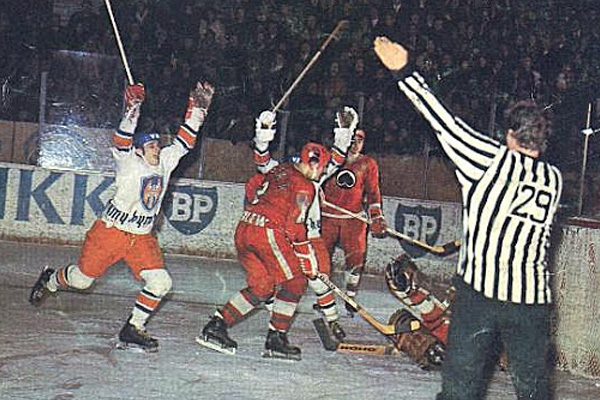
A Tappara player scoring on Ässät's net

Not much was expected from Ässät in the following seasons. Ässät remained the same after the championship season and an arena was built in Pori, but no lasting success was achieved. In the four seasons following the championship season, the club placed in the middle caste of the series and did not seek medals, but there was no threat of relegation either.

Not was much expected for the 1975–76 season. The worst loss was Pekka Rautakallio's departure to North America. However, promising young people came to Ässät; Tapio Levo filled the gap left by Rautakallio. The net was blocked by the young Antero Kivelä. The young team of Ässät showed their potential in the series by beating the clubs that were predicted to be at top of the series. It was worst experienced by the future champion TPS, who Ässät beat 14–0. However, the access for Ässät to the top four in the playoffs was only decided in the final round against Lukko. In the semi-finals, Ässät challenged Tappara, who advanced to the finals 2–0. In the bronze matches against HIFK, Ässät's hunger for victory was greater and the team took the bronze winning the series 2–0.

At least as good a performance was expected for the following season, 1976–77, but Ässät remained fifth in the series and thus did not make the playoffs.

== 1977–1987: Medal streak and the downfall ==
=== Championship 1977–78 ===
The 1977–78 season again raised hopes of success when Pekka Rautakallio and Veli-Pekka Ketola returned to Ässät from North America. In addition, promising young people played in the club, such as Arto Javanainen, Kari Makkonen, Tapio Levo and Harry Nikander. Ässät finished second in the regular season after Tappara and defeated TPS 3–2 in the semi-finals. The final series against Tappara did not start promisingly, as Tappara won the first match in Tampere 8–0. However, Ässät won the rest of the games, and the club achieved its second Finnish Championship. The last match at the Porin jäähalli (now Isomäki Areena) was estimated to have been attended by more than 13,000 spectators, even though only 8,600 spectators should have been allowed into the arena at that time. There were more spectators in the auditorium than in any other previous hockey match played in Finland. In the early years of the SM-liiga (Note: SM-sarja was replaced by SM-liiga in 1975) in the second half of the 1970s, Ässät was one of the league's absolute top teams. The most important player on the team was the captain, center Veli-Pekka Ketola, who had returned from the North American WHA League. Ketola broke the point record in the playoffs at the time.

=== Silver 1978–79 ===
The season that followed the championship, 1978–79, went as expected for Ässät in the regular season. The team won it by five points to Tappara. In the semifinals, Ässät knocked out HIFK with a win of 3-0 and advanced to the final against Tappara. Last year's finalists struggled again for the championship. The final series became a thrilling play. Tappara won the first two matches, Ässät the next two and the final series thus stretched to the fifth, decisive match. The match played in Pori ended with Tappara's 2–5 victory, so Ässät was left with silver.

=== Silver 1979–80 ===
In the following season, 1979–80, Ässät were nowhere near the previous season in the regular season, finishing fourth. In the semi-finals, TPS was defeated by Ässät 3–1, winning the finals for the third time in a row. HIFK came up against Ässät. HIFK took the championship 3–0, so Ässät were silver medallists again.

=== Silver 1983–84 ===
After the silver seasons, Ässät suffered bad losses when Veli-Pekka Ketola went back to North America. Tapio Levo also joined the NHL. In addition, Risto Tuomi and Veli-Matti Ruisma went to the Swedish league and Erkki Väkiparta retired. In the following seasons, Ässät placed in the middle caste of the SM-Liiga. For the 1983–84 season, the team received well-known returnees when Tapio Levo returned from the NHL and Risto Tuomi and Harry Nikander from Sweden. The team was also strengthened by its own juniors, from whom more top players of the future were emerging; In addition to Javanainen and Levo, Kari Takko and Christian Ruuttu, among others. The team placed second in the regular season and beat Oulun Kärpät 3–2 in the semi-finals. In the finals, the opponent was again Tappara. The series was close. Ässät won the first match in overtime but Tappara took the next three. The overtime goal of the decisive match secured Tappara the championship with 3–1 victories.

=== 1984–1987 ===
In the following season, 1984–85, Ässät survived to the medal games, but still finished fourth. In the next three seasons, 1985–88, the team's success slowed down and Ässät were placed in the middle caste of the SM-liiga. However, access to the top four playoffs was only a few points away each time, so there was no threat of relegation. Ässät also saw the first foreigner in the 1986–87 season, when a Canadian Mark Jooris played in Pori for two seasons.

== 1988–1990: New momentum from Division 1 ==
For the 1988–89 season, Ässät prepared without major goals. A handful of regular players left the team, and no new high-class players were acquired due to the tight economic situation, but playing time was given to young promises. Sean Toomey, Rejean Boivin and later Risto Tuomi were acquired from abroad to replace Brad Beck, who was acquired to replace this injury. The season started well, but as the series progressed, Ässät sank to the tail end of the league. In the final round, Ässät met Oulun Kärpät in the "jumbo final". The set-up was that with the win, Ässät would rise to tenth above the qualifying line and retain their place without qualifying. In any case, Kärpät had to play the qualification games. Kärpät won the match 2–1 and Ässät were the last in the series, having to qualify for their league place against JoKP. The qualifiers became a thrilling play. The first qualifying match in Joensuu ended bitterly for Ässät, JoKP won with an overtime goal. Ässät won the next match in Pori, but in Joensuu JoKP won again. Ässät won the fourth match at home again. In the decisive match, the club's veterans Levo, Makkonen and Nikander and a few others gave their all in front of their team, but the Yankee reinforcements acquired unnecessary coolers, and the spirit of the game was not entirely clear to everyone else from outside Pori. JoKP won the game 5–3 and Ässät fell to the I Division.

However, relegation to Division I for the period 1989–90 raised the hockey boom in Pori as the townspeople stood behind their team. Audience numbers increased from previous league seasons as Ässät's excerpts were followed with interest. For the I Division season, Ässät received top confirmations when Arto Javanainen returned from TPS and Arto Heiskanen from Lukko. Alexei Frolikov and Vladimir Durdin from Riga Dynamo. Matti "Mölli" Keinonen became the coach. The division visit was only for the duration of the season. The aces were superior in the regular season, breaking numerous Division I records and progressing effortlessly to victory and league qualifiers in the series. In the qualifiers, JoKP was met. Ässät won the series 3-0 and returned to the SM-liiga.

== 1990–1995: A new start with Vasily Tikhonov ==
Ässät did not celebrate their return to the SM-liiga for a long time, and the club immediately began preparing for the next season, 1990–91. Ässät had a Liiga-level team already during the I-divisioona times and the team body remained the same. A contract extension was signed with foreign players Alexei Frolikov and Vladimir Durdin, who proved to be strong players, but luck wasn't on Ässät's side as Durdin died in a car accident while on his way to his hometown Riga. Andrei Pyatanov from the Riga Dynamo was a replacement for Durdin. The most significant acquisition for the coming years was Jari Korpisalo from Karhu-Kissat. Matti Keinonen continued as coach. Re-learning to play Liiga-level hockey took the early part of the season. At times, the team played steadily against the top teams in the series but on the other hand often collapsed against the weaker ones. The club management decided to hire Vasily Tikhonov, the son of Viktor Tikhonov, the long-time coach of the Soviet hockey national team, as the coach to replace Keinonen. The rise of Ässät began immediately. It defeated the reigning champion TPS in the next match and eventually battled all the way for sixth place and the final playoffs, but was still two points behind.

The meager loss of the playoff spot lowered the morale of the team, and the target for the following season, 1991-92, was already set higher. There was potential, as the team's body consisted of experienced players: Arto Javanainen, Arto Heiskanen, Tapio Levo, Harry Nikander, Juha Jyrkkiö and Aleksei Frolikov. The team also had good young players, such as Jokke Heinänen, Rauli Raitanen, Janne Virtanen, Olli Kaski and Jari Levonen. A new Latvian player was acquired again when Pyatanov was replaced by Andrei Matitsin. Promising young people were acquired from Division I when Petri Varis came from KooKoo and Jouni Vento from FoPS. Ässät also got a high class player when goalie Kari Takko returned from the NHL to his home club. In the second Liiga season after the promotion, Tikhonov's coaching was on the rise, with the Ässät finishing fifth in the regular season and taking out Lukko in the playoffs. Ässät advanced to the semi-finals against Jokerit. Ässät had to fight fiercely against Jokerit, whose brightest star was the young Teemu Selänne. Ässät won both of their home games and thus stretched to the fifth game of the series, but in the decisive battle, Jokerit was the better in the final with a 5–0 win. In the bronze medal game, HIFK took the medals with a 2–0 win, so Ässät finished fourth in the second post-division season.

For the 1993–94 season Ässät lost coach Vasily Tikhonov to the San Jose Sharks. The new coach was former Ässät player Veli-Pekka Ketola. Ketola's merits as a player were great, but his coaching skills were highly questioned. Doubts were dampened when Ässät finished second in the regular season. The performance was quite good, as the team had weakened a bit with the departure of Petri Varis. In the semi-finals, äsät and Tappara met. Tappara wom Ässät in the first two games. Ässät managed to level the wins to 2–2, but Tappara won the last match 1–4 and, to the disappointment of the Pori crowd, advanced to the semi-finals.

Ässät suffered significant losses just before the 1994–95 season, when Olli Kaski left for Sweden, Vjačeslavs Fanduļs went to TPS and Arto Javanainen moved to Denmark to end his successful career. Ässät does not remain idle. Veli-Pekka Ketola's job description was expanded from coaching to the role of general manager. Ässät replaced the lost players with Timo Nykopp, Harri Laurila and Teppo Kivelä, as well as Czech players Jaroslav Otevřel and Jiri Veber. Pasi Peltonen, who later had a long career in Ässät, was also raised from the juniors. Ässät finished sixth in the regular season and dropped HIFK 3.0 from the playoffs. In the semi-finals against Jokerit, Ässät only lost their home game in overtime, but in the Helsinki games the Jokerit was overwhelmingly superior and progressed deservedly to the final. Ässät played for the bronze medal against Satakunta's local opponent Lukko. The winners of the match played in Rauma were Ässät with 3 goals, so the bronze medals ended up in Ässät.

== 1995–2001 ==
After the bronze season in 1995–96, Ässät was considered to be the number one challenger to TPS and Jokerit, who already dominated the SM-liiga. New reinforcements were Pekka Virta and Tomáš Kapusta. Ässät's effective number one line, consisting of Jari Korpisalo, Tomáš Kapusta and Jaroslav Otevřel, was unbeatable, but the line broke down after Kapusta was injured in the middle of the season. Ässät started the season with a winning streak and everything looked good. However, Jokerit and TPS were far ahead of other teams, but Ässät were firmly in third place until the final meters. However, the situation changed in February 1996, when the match against JyP HT in Pori was the most serious accident in the history of the SM-liiga, when Ässät's Otevřel was seriously injured. There were only seven rounds left in the regular season, but Ässät's players who were shocked by the incident had lost their desire to play and Ässät won two more matches during the season. In the semi-finals, TPS defeated Ässät straight, winning 3–0.

After the 1997–98 season, Ässät's playing success no longer carried the team into the playoffs, and the following years were quite a toddler at every level of the organization. Bankruptcy was not far off, and senior officials were arrested on suspicion of tax evasion, although charges were subsequently dropped. The base quotation was the season 2000–01, when Ässät were the last in the league.

== 2005–06: Back to the finals ==
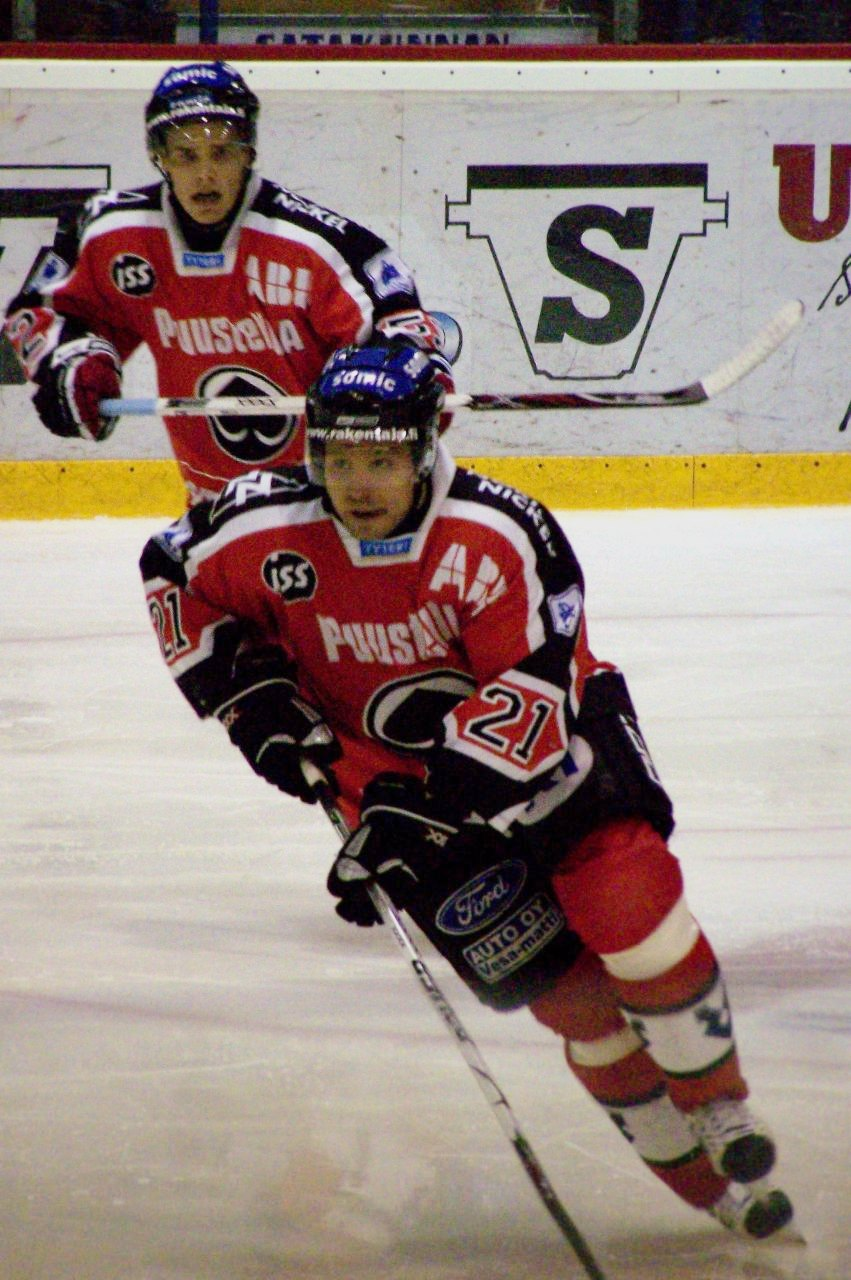
Marko Kivenmäki (lower) and Ville Uusitalo (upper)

With the club's toddler, the fanatical audience in Pori had time to level off due to the team's weak performances, until the hockey boom was revived in the 2005–06 season with the success of Ässät. The team survived fifth in the regular season, with Marko Kivenmäki and Kristian Kuusela as their brightest stars. The team also included enterprising promising young people such as Jesse Joensuu and Leo Komarov. Ässät first surprised Tappara, who was the favorite in the quarterfinals, with a 4–2 match win. In the semi-finals, the champion favorite Oulun Kärpät met. Ässät won the series 3-1 and advanced to the final after a 22-year break. In the final series against HPK, Ässät's efforts were no longer enough, and HPK won the championship 3–1. Winged by surprising success, the Pori hockey boom helped the club rise from years of financial distress.

== 2009–2010 ==
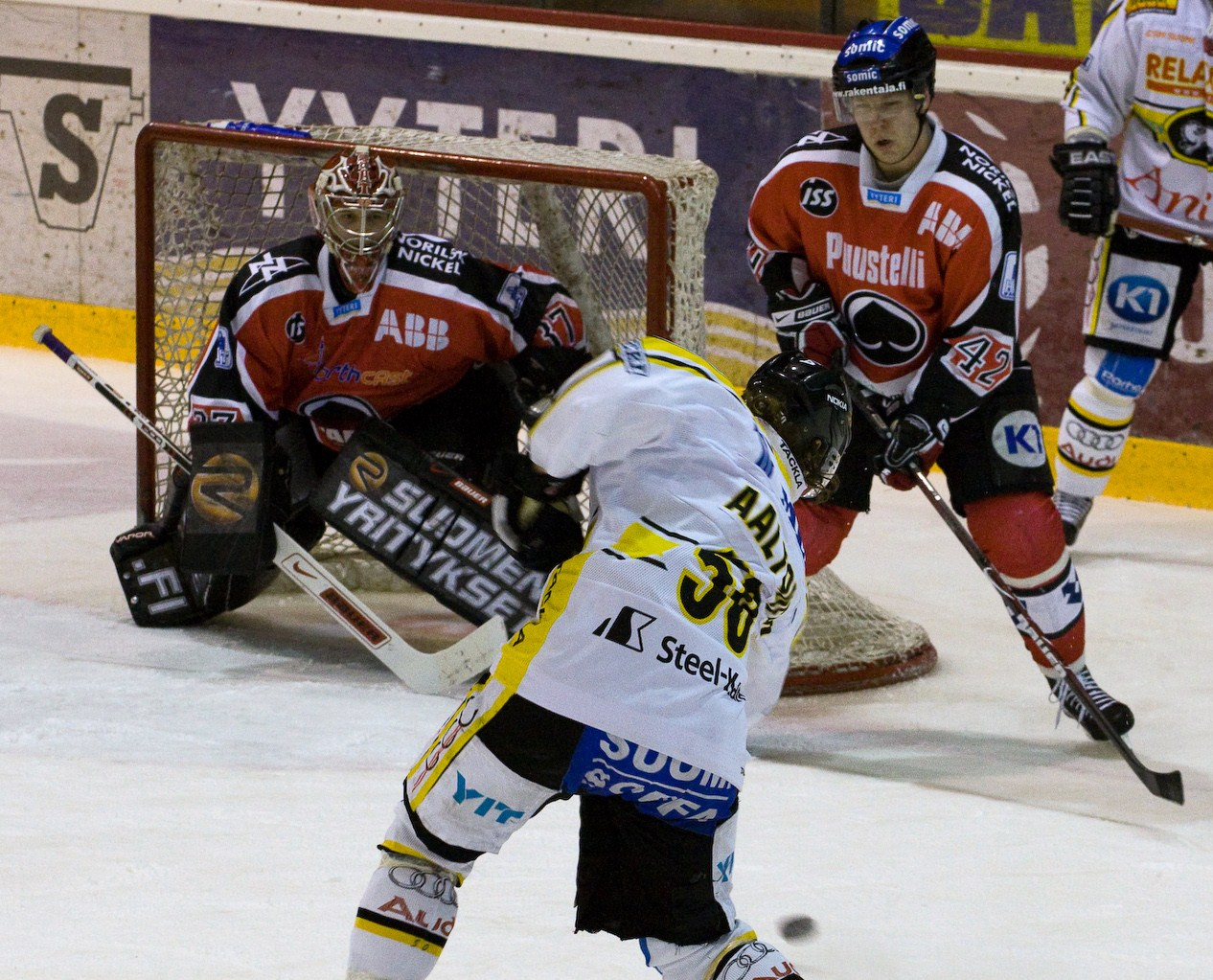
Ässät - Kärpät game in 2009

Ässät started the 2009–10 season under the coaching of a new head coach, Pekka Rautakallio, a former Ässät player and former NHL player. Until the end of January, the team was very much involved in the battle for a direct playoff spot in the top six, but the season ended in 13th place. On the junior side, all age groups made it to the playoff games and the B-juniors achieved bronze medals.

== 2012–2013: Surprise championship ==
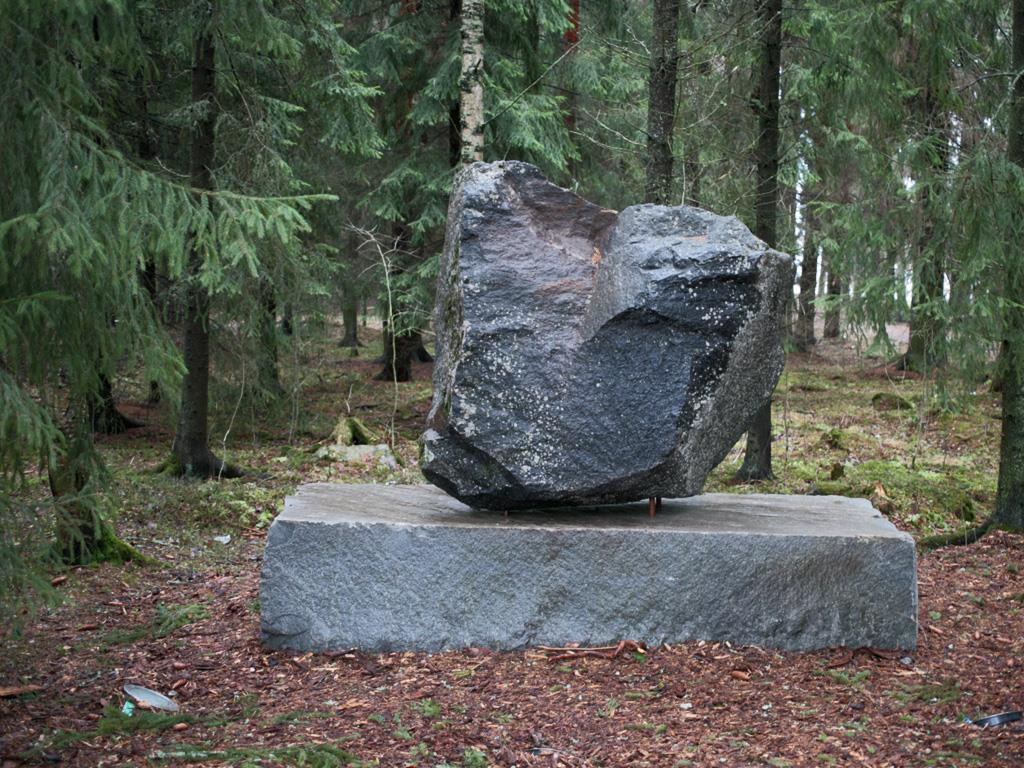
"The Stone of victory" is a stone that was moved to Pori next to the Isomäki Ice Hall to honor the 2013 Finnish Champions.

The 2012–13 season went differently for Ässät. It started the season strongly, but by the turn of the year had fallen below the playoff line. The team sold its No. 1 center, Stephen Dixon to a KHL team Lokomotiv Yaroslavl. At the end of January Ässät started the longest winning streak in their history, ending only in the last previous round of the regular season with an overtimetime loss against Oulu Kärpät. The standings rose to twelfth to fourth. In the quarterfinals, Ässät won KalPa 4–1. Semifinals against JyP Ässät started with an overtime win when Michael Ryan scored the winning time in 92.51. Ässät won the second match in Pori 2–0 and the third in Jyväskylä 1–4. JyP narrowed the situation with their 1–2 away victory, but Ässät won the fifth match 0-1 and advanced to the finals. Tappara won the first final 2–1 after Jukka Peltola scored five seconds before the end of the regular time. The second final match in Pori was won by Ässät 5–1. In the third match, Tappara was better with 3-2 goals, and the winning goal was scored by Niclas Lucenius just one second before the end of the actual game time. Ässät won the fourth match 4–0 in their home arena. In the fifth final match, Ässät took the away victory with goals 1–2. Veli-Matti Savinainen finished the winning goal from Ville Uusitalo's pass in the third overtime in 108.59. The match was the longest final match in SM-liiga history and the third longest in all playoffs. Ässät won the Finnish Championship after winning Tappara in the sixth final 3–2 with Jyri Marttinen's goal, and at the same time the whole series was won by Ässät 4–2. The Pori team had won their previous championship in 1978. A real generational change was seen after the match, when the captain of the 1978 championship team, Veli-Pekka Ketola, came on the ice to hand over the Kanada malja to captain Ville Uusitalo.

== 2013–2019: After the championship ==
=== 2013–14 ===
In the season following the championship, Ässät was coached by Pekka Virta. Ässät signed a former NHL forward Niklas Hagman. The team played variedly, being well involved in the competition for a playoff spot until the November World Championships break. After that, however, a downturn began, from which the team no longer recovered and they ended the season in 12th place in the regular season.

=== 2014–15 ===
In the 2014–15 season, Pekka Rautakallio returned to the Ässät. The team started the season with a young team and played in the regular season variably except for the losing streak in October and February. During autumn, Ässät lost the lead several times in the third period, losing in regular time or overtime. Ässät finished 9th in the regular season and faced SaiPa in the 1st round of the playoffs. SaiPa sent Ässät directly to the summer holidays in two games.

=== 2015–16 ===
In the beginning of the 2015–16 season, Ässät had to start with a long guest tour. The team clearly picked up after the start of the home games and was well involved in the playoff competition until the end of January, when it started to lag behind. Mikael Kotkaniemi replaced Pekka Rautakallio as the coach of Ässät in mid-February. In the following season, Jyrki Aho took over the lead responsibility for the team.

=== 2016–17 ===
In the 2016–17 season, Ässät signed many new players. The team did well, ranking directly to the playoffs for most of the season. At the end of the regular season, however, Ässät were unable to secure a direct playoff spot. In the first round of the playoffs, Tampereen Ilves settled, who sent Ässät to the summer holidays with a win of 1–3.

=== 2017–18 ===
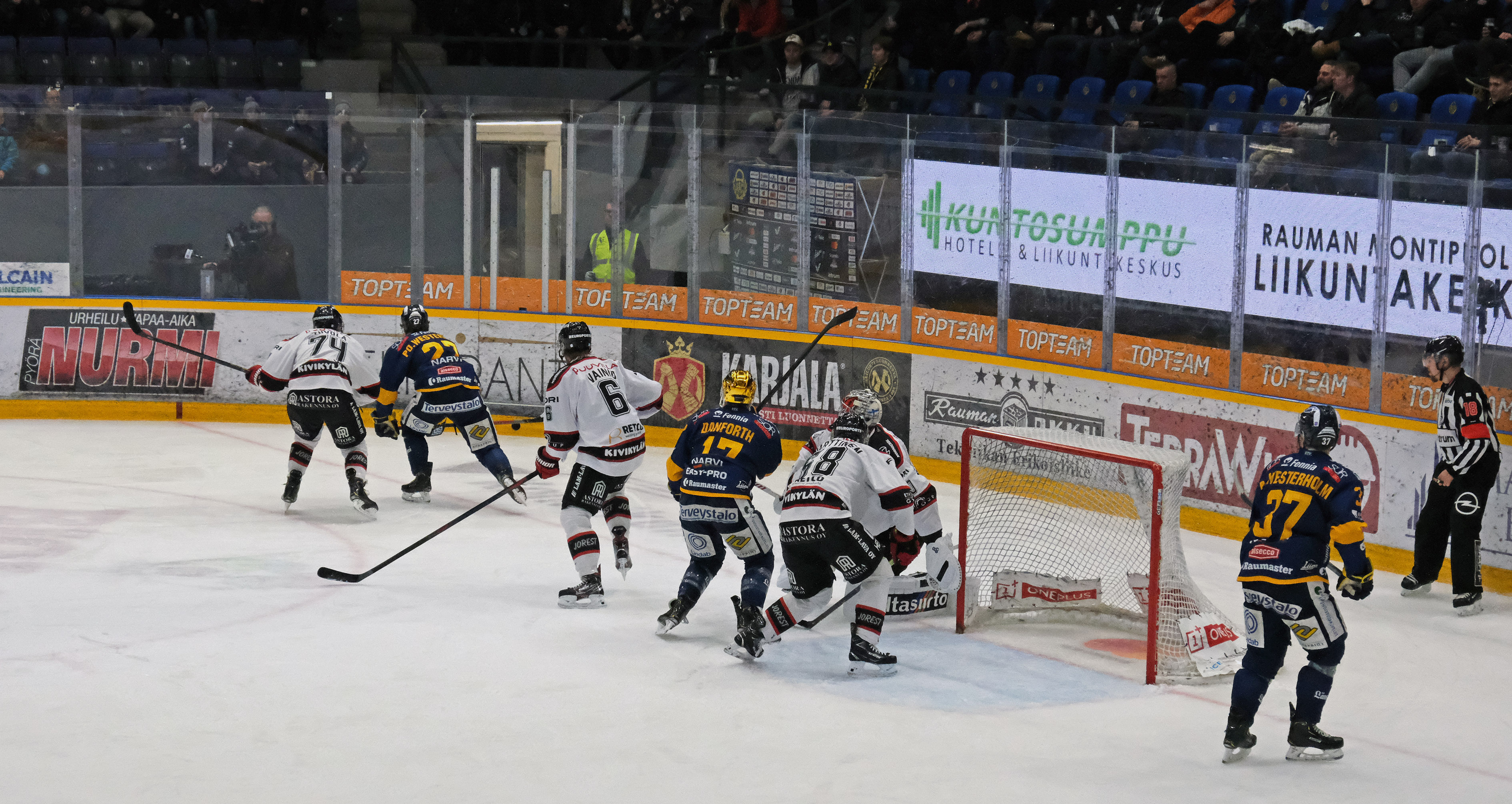
Ässät playing against Lukko in November 2019

In the 2017–18 season, Ässät were renewed more. Jesperi Kotkaniemi was put in the Liiga line-up from the U20 league. During the World Championship break in November, Ässät strengthened their team with high-class returnees when Jarno Kärki, who moved to Tappara at the end of the previous season, and Sakari Salminen, who had played abroad for many years, returned. In January, Tommi Taimi returned to Ässät. Ässät were among the top six in the regular season throughout the autumn season, returning to 4th place after the Christmas break. The course of Ässät improved and the team started to win again, finishing in 8th place at the end of the regular season. Ässät sent Lukko directly to the summer holidays with a win of 2–0 and advanced to the semi-finals against Oulun Kärpät. In the series against Kärpät, Ässät were able to challenge them, but the Kärpät eventually won the series 4–1.

=== 2018–19 ===
After the 2017–19 season, Ässät lost four defencemen and eight forwards. Ässät replaced the lost players with four forwards and two defenceman and additionally signed two junior players, Juuso Ketola and Otto Kivenmäki to professional contracts. In September 2018, Ässät took Severi Sillanpää and Tuomas Huhtanen on one month long try-out contracts. In October, Ässät signed a two-year contract with defenceman Jyri Marttinen, after he had terminated his contract with the Rauman Lukko. Ässät finished last place in the series with 47 points. Ässät's leader in points was Sakari Salminen with 31.

== 2022–present: Rebuild ==
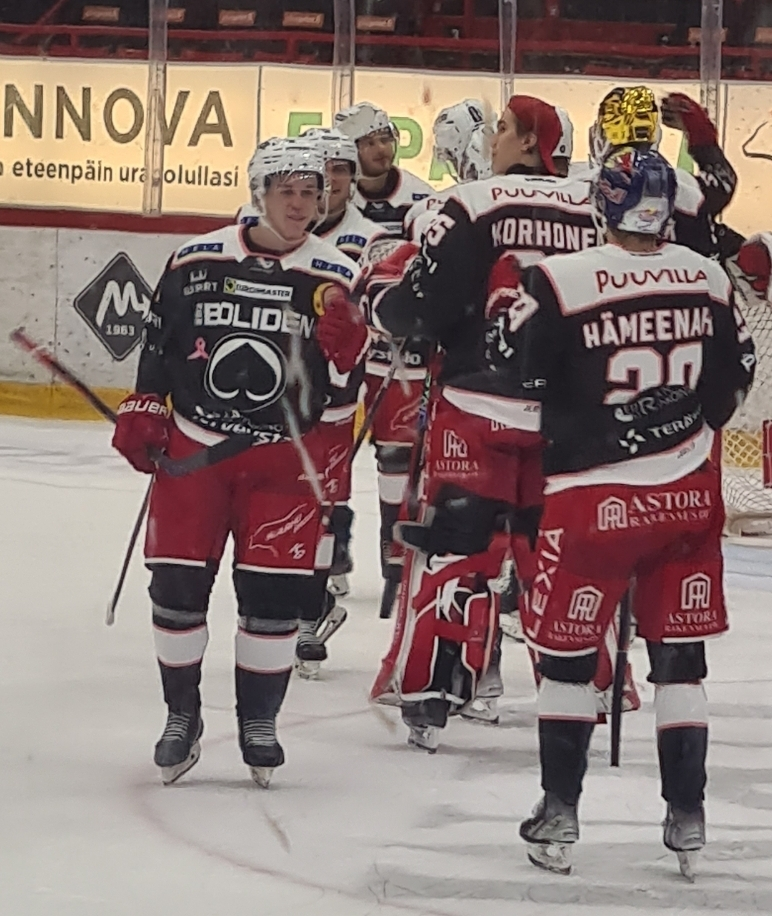
Ässät celebrating a victory against Jukurit on 15.10 2022. Ässät wore special black-white-pink jerseys and donated to a cancer research charity.

After Ässät finished 15th (last) place in the 2021-22 season, Ässät started a rebuild by firing their coach, Ari-pekka Selin and hiring Karri Kivi and Jere Härkälä.

=== Back to the playoffs: 2022–2023 ===
Ässät signed players considered as top tier players like Jesse Joensuu, Roope Talaja, Jan-Mikael Järvinen, Ian McCoshen, Dominic Turgeon, Niklas Rubin and Joachim Rohdin. Ässät also picked up some of their own junior players from the U20 league. Ässät also published their future plans like the player budgets for example. Ässät named Jesse Joensuu as captain. Alexander Ruuttu, Niklas Appelgren and Jan-Mikael Järvinen were named as assistant captains. Ässät hired a new sports manager, Janne Vuorinen, to replace Tommi Kerttula.

Ässät started the 2022–23 season by winning the Pitsiturnaus tournament for the first time since 2004. Ässät's first regular season game was against Ilves, Ässät lost 3–0. Ässät's first victory came at a home in a game against JYP HT, Ässät won 5–0. The first Satakunnan derby game was played in the West Areena on 21 October 2022, the game ended in Lukko's 2–6 victory.

On February 13, Ässät announced that it had signed goaltender Cody Porter to a contract covering the rest of the season due to Niklas Rubin's injury on 8 February. Porter was later sent back to RoKi on a loan.

On 4 March 2023, Ässät secured a playoff spot with a 2–1 win against Lukko in the last Satakunta derby of the regular season. Ässät and Lukko played 6 regular season games against each other with 3–3 wins and 9–9 points.

Ässät finished 8th in the regular season with 91 points and faces HC TPS in the first round of the playoffs in a best-of-three series. Ässät beat TPS in the first game 2–1. TPS beat Ässät in the 2nd game 2–1. TPS scored their winning goal in the last minutes of the third period after a rather questionable penalty when TPS player Taneli Ronkainen pushed Ässät player Emil Erholtz on TPS goaltender Lassi Lehtinen, which got Erholtz a 2 minute penalty, during which TPS scored their goal. The linesman director of Liiga, Jyri Rönn, admitted the mistake and apologized to Ässät after the incident. Ässät beat TPS in the last game 2–1 and will face Ilves in the 2nd round.

Ässät's first game against Ilves ended in a 5–1 loss. The second game ended in Ässät's 5–2 victory. Ilves beat Ässät 4–1 in the third and the fourth game. Ässät's season came to an end after a 3–2 loss against Ilves.

=== Current season (2023–24) ===
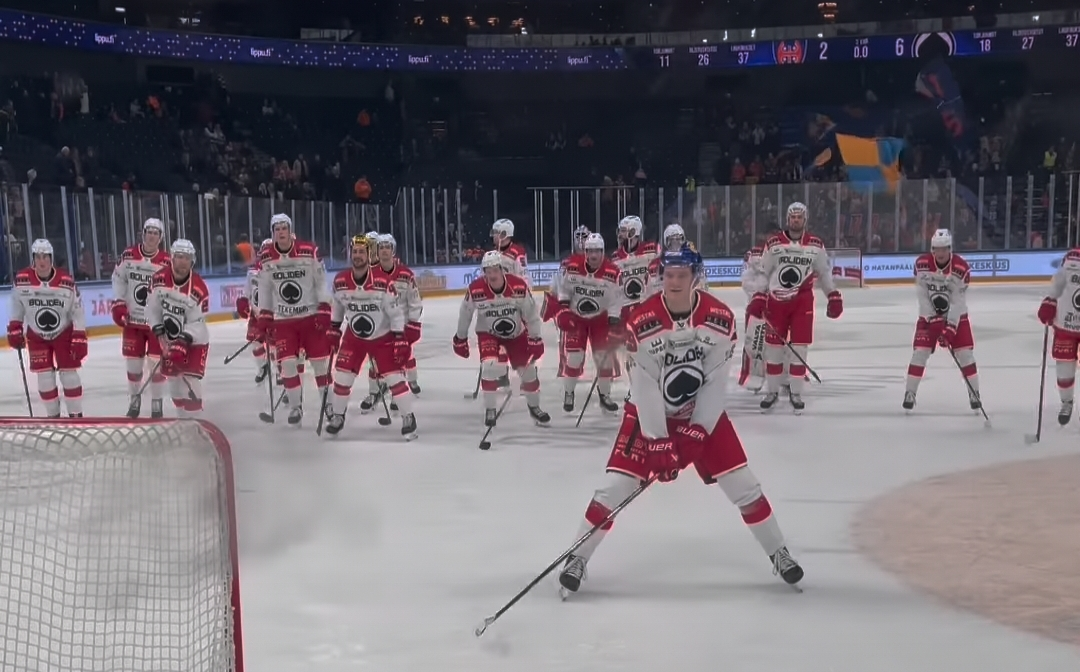
Ässät celebrating a 2–6 victory over Tappara Tampere on 25 October 2023

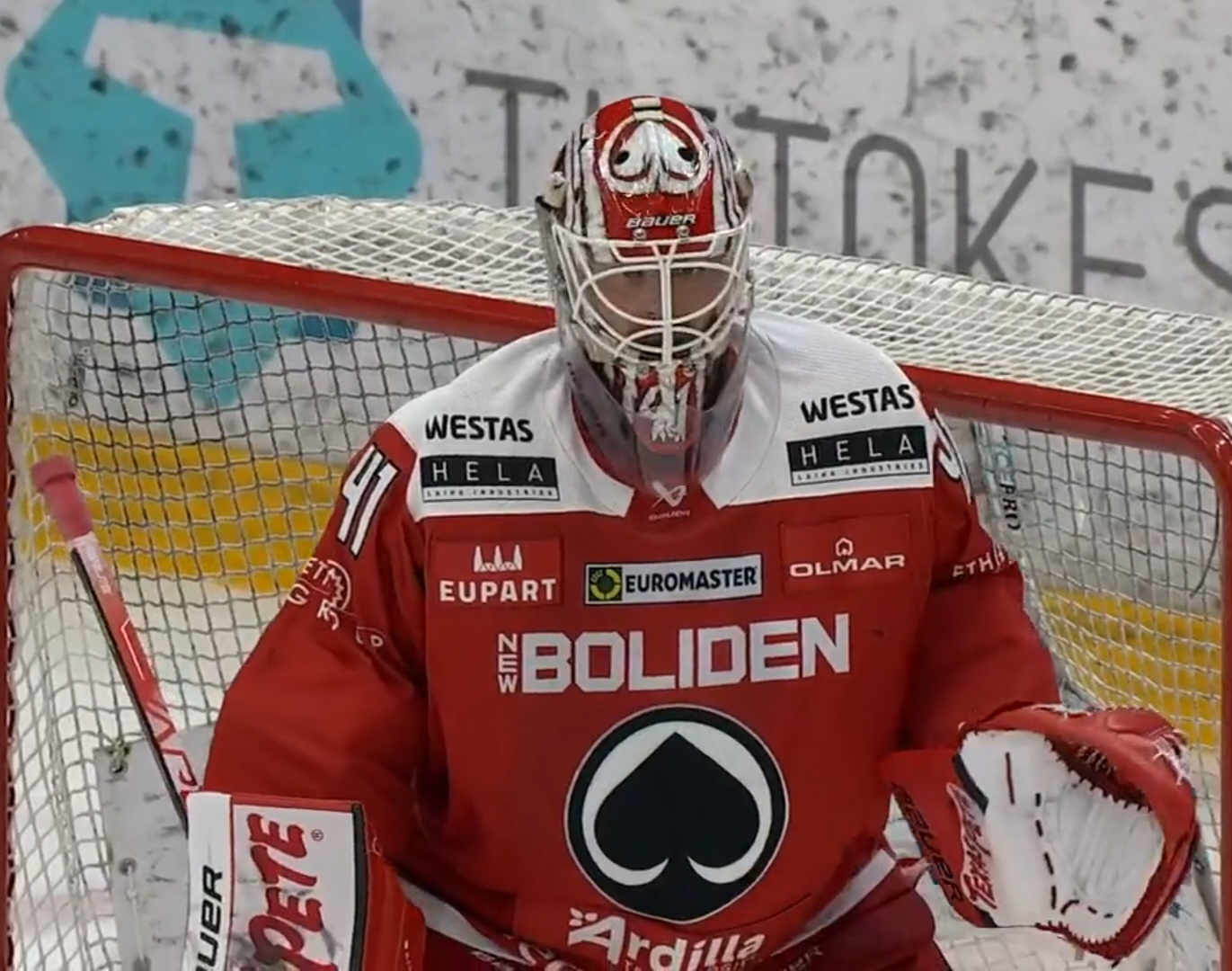
Ässät's starting goalie, Niklas Rubin, in 2024

Ässät started the work on the 2023–24 season by promoting Jere Härkälä to head coach. On 4 April 2023, Ässät's sporting manager announced that it did not use the additional year on Eemeli Virtanen' and Samuli Aaltonen's 2+1 style contracts, but it did use Will Graber's additional year on his 1+1 contract. On the same article it was told that Ässät's training would start on 2 May 2023 and all contracts would be published throughout April. Ässät's elite goaltender, Niklas Rubin, had already signed a one-year extension to his contract during the 2022–23 season. Defenceman Nikolas Matinpalo extended his contract by two years, but he signed a one-year deal with the Ottawa Senators. Jami Virtanen also signed a two-year extension. Ässät signed junior players from Jokerit, Jukurit and Kärpät to compete for a spot in the Liiga roster. These juniors were Nestor Noiva, Topi Vuori, Topias Rovio and Otso Ylitalo. Ässät signed the player of the year award winner of the Fjordkraftligaen, Martin Lefebvre, to a one-year deal. Ässät signed two Swedish brothers, Marcus and Jonathan Davidsson to a one-year deal and a Finnish defenceman who played his junior career in Sweden, Tuomas Salmela to a one-year deal. Ässät signed French forward and the Jean-Pierre Graff Trophy winner Dylan Fabre to a two-year contract.

Ässät's season started with the traditional preseason tournament, the Pitsiturnaus. Ässät made the finals for a second time in a row but lost in the final to rival team Lukko 2–1. Ässät also took part in the Tampere Cup where they first played against Timrå IK from Sweden and then proceed to play Tappara in the bronze game, which Ässät lost.

The regular season started with a home game against Ilves on 13 September 2023. Ässät lost the game 4–3. Ässät's first victory came in a game against KalPa on 16 September, which Ässät won 6–0. On 26 September, Ässät announced that Jonathan Davidsson has a long injury, and that they have signed Juuso Ikonen to a contract for the rest of the season.

Ässät finished the season on 11th place, just missing the playoffs.

== Retired numbers ==
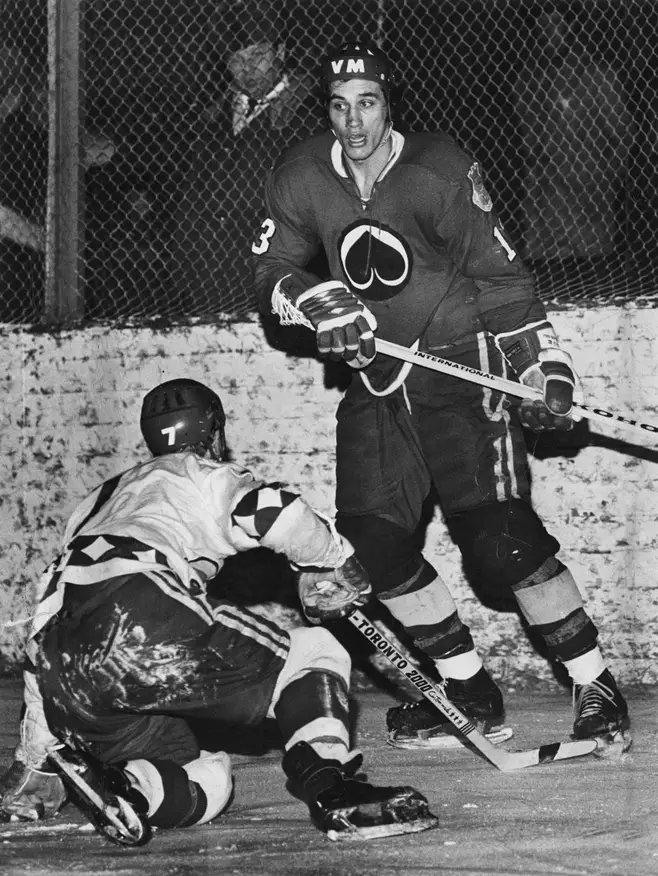
Veli-Pekka Ketola's number, 13, has been retired by Ässät

All of Ässät's retired numbers are hanging from the rafters of the arena except for Jaroslav Otevřel's number.

List of retired numbers:

Ässät retired numbers
| No. | Player | Position | Career | Date of retirement |
|---|---|---|---|---|
| 2 | Antti Heikkilä | D | 1967–1981 | |
| 4 | Arto Javanainen | RW | 1976–1984 1985–1987 1989–1994 | |
| 5 | Pekka Rautakallio | D | 1968–1975 1977–1979 | 27 January 2024 |
| 11 | Raimo Kilpiö | F | 1967–1977 | 21 September 2019 |
| 12 | Tapio Levo | D | 1972–1981 1983–1992 | 21 November 2007 |
| 13 (Note: The number 13 was also retired by Ässät in 2015 for Lasse Heikkilä in the honor of the Porin Karhut. It is considered that the player is retired in Karhut, not Ässät.) | Veli-Pekka Ketola | C | 1967–1974 1977–1981 | 22 November 2007 (Note: Originally retired in 2003, un-retired in 2004 but re-retired in 2007) |
| 22 | Kari Makkonen | LW | 1974–1979 1980–1991 | 2 February 2024 |
| 89 | Jaroslav Otevřel | LW | 1994–1996 | 11 February 1996 |
