= Pataljoona =

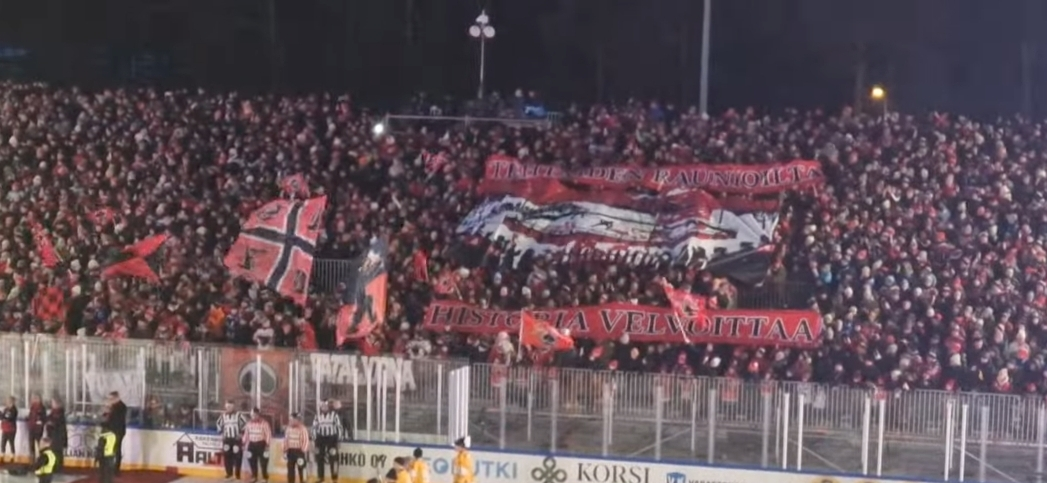
- Pataljoona at the Winter Classic in 2025
- Established: 2007
- Type: Ice hockey supporter group
- Club: HC Ässät Pori
- Arena: Isomäki Ice Hall
- Stand: Seisomakatsomo
- Membership: ~200
- Colours

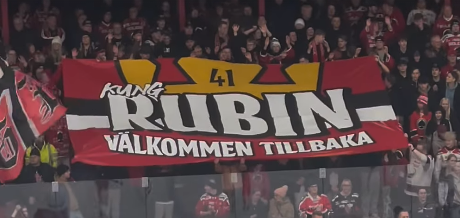
Pataljoona's tifo for Niklas Rubin in 2024

Ässät Fan Club/Pataljoona ry, otherwise known as Pataljoona (Finnish for Battalion), is the official supporters' organization of Porin Ässät. Pataljoona is present at Ässät's home and away games, especially Lukko–Ässät derby games. Pataljoona has chants supported by a drum, a megaphone, flags, signs and tifos. In Ässät's home games, Pataljoona is located in the standing section of the Isomäki Areena.

Ässät's fans are known for being loud in the fan section called Seisomakatsomo (standing section). During the 2008–09 season, Pataljoona was the third largest fan organization by members in Finland.

Pataljoona also works with the Karhunkämmen. Karhunkämmen is a fan club that works with multiple teams from Pori (e.g. Pesäkarhut, FC Jazz and Ässät).

== History ==
In the 2008–09 SM-liiga season, Pataljoona was the third largest fan organization by members in Finland, if only registered organizations are counted.

In a game against Ilves on October 16 2021, Pataljoona left the stands and watched the game from the hallway as protest for Ässät's poor playing. Ässät finished last in the regular season.

In 2022, Pataljoona started to work with Karhunkämmen. In 2024 while Ässät's captain Jesse Joensuu was suspended from playing, he joined the Ässät fans in the fan section.

== Supporting style ==
In an article in 2017, Yleisradio, the Finnish national public broadcasting company, described the standing section of the Isomäki Areena as the best fan section in Finland.

Several news outlets have had Ässät fans described as "brutal". After a scored goal by Ässät, the fans might call their opponent's goalie a sieve (seula in Finnish). Ässät fans are also known for being hard on their own players, especially if the team is playing poorly.

== Rivalries ==
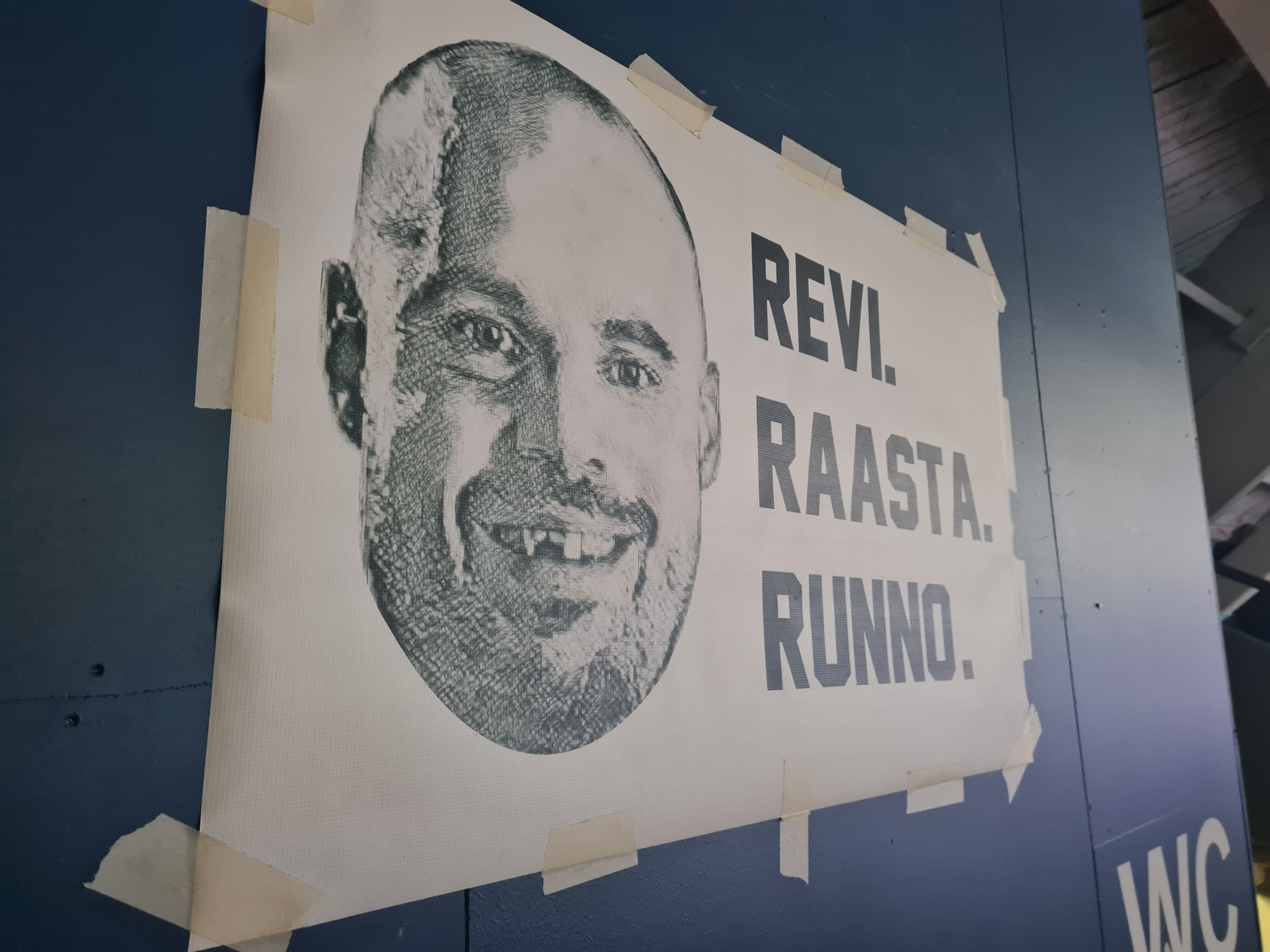
Pataljoona's banner in a Satakunnan derby away game in 2023.

Pataljoona's main rival is considered to be Raumam Boja, the fan organization of Rauman Lukko. In 2015, Pataljoona had left their flags and a banderole on a bus that later carried the Raumam Boja group in it. Reportedly RB had stolen the equipment. The rivalry between Ässät and Lukko is known as the Satakunnan derby.

Ässät also has a rivalry with Vaasan Sport and their fan groups Red Army and Ultras 06. Sport fans are known for destroying and vandalizing Ässät's arena. The rivalry between Ässät and Sport is known as the Kasitien derby.
