= Satakunnan derby =

Ice hockey matchups

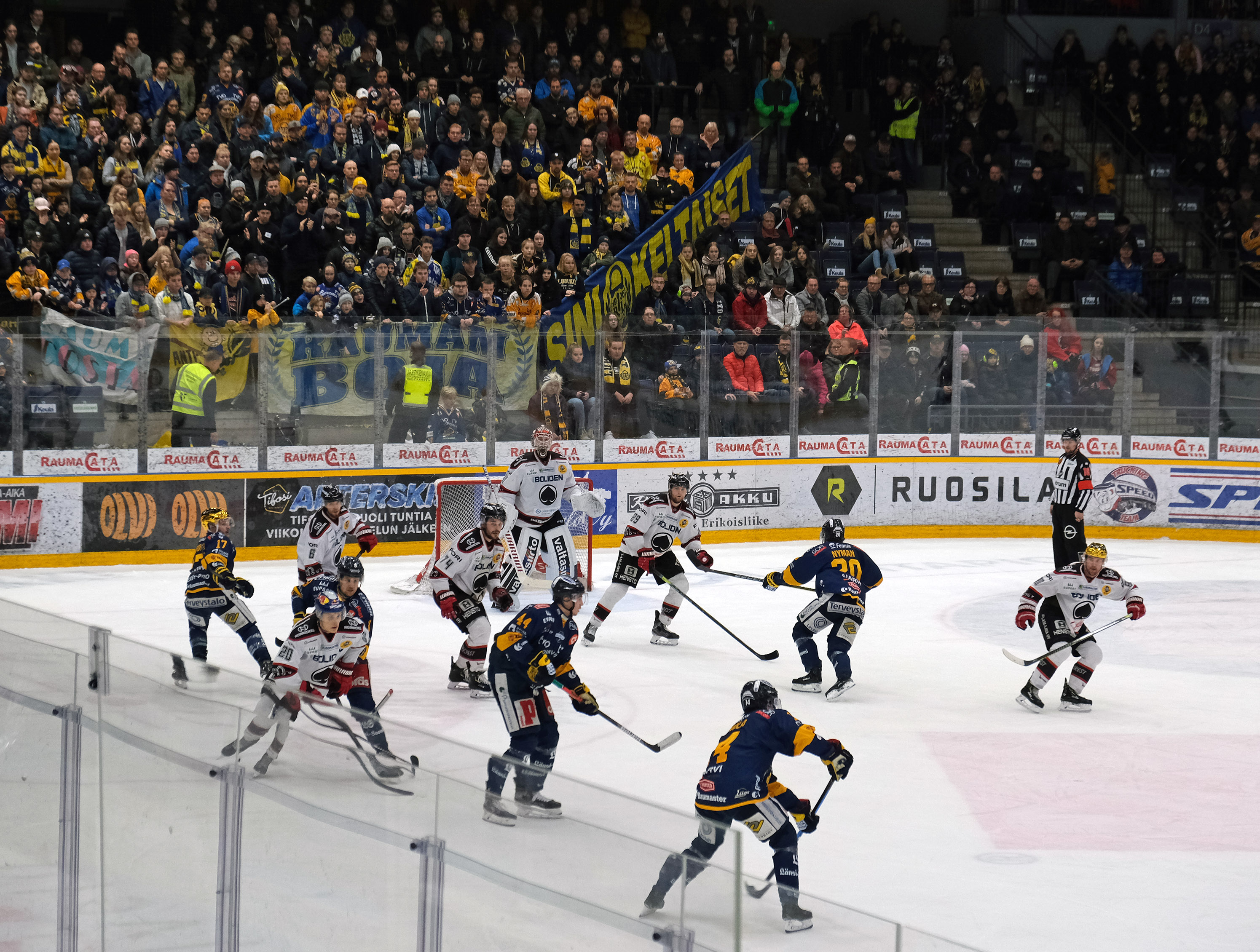
- Lukko–Ässät game in Rauma in 2019
- Other names: Satakunnan paikallinen ("Satakunta's local")
- Sport: Ice hockey
- Teams: HC Ässät Pori; Rauman Lukko
- First meeting: 15 December 1968
- Latest meeting: 24 January 2026
- Next meeting: TBD
- Stadiums: Isomäki Areena; Kivikylän Areena

Statistics
- Largest victory: Ässät 17–3 Lukko; 12 January 1978
- Longest win streak: Ässät W10; Lukko W10
- Longest unbeaten streak: Ässät W10
- Current win streak: Ässät W2

Satakunnan derby is a name used for ice hockey matchups between Porin Ässät and Rauman Lukko of the Liiga. Lukko and Ässät are placed into the same block, which means that they play six games against each other in one Liiga regular season. Both teams also participate in the annual Pitsiturnaus preseason tournament hosted by Lukko. Ässät and Lukko have met in the playoffs three times (1992, 1995 and 2018), playing a total of five games. Ässät has won all five of them.

== Background ==
The cities of Pori and Rauma have been rivals for generations due them being close to each other and being the two biggest cities in their province. The rivalry has been reflected onto sports competitions. The people of the two cities have a history of making fun of each other, and some describe the relationship between the cities as hate. Both cities are located in the western coast of Finland.

== History ==
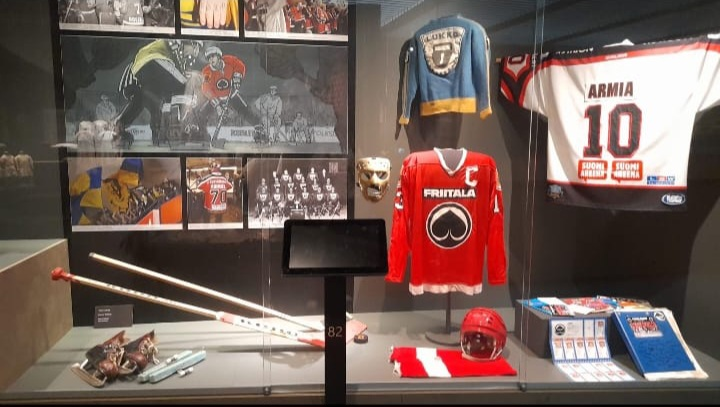
Lukko and Ässät gear in a museum

The first ever Satakunnan derby game was played on 15 December 1968, in Rauma. The game ended in a 3–3 draw. The first ever derby victory was accomplished by Ässät on 23 February 1969, when they beat Lukko at home 3–2.

On 12 January 1978, Ässät beat Lukko 17–3. Ässät won the championship during that season while Lukko was second last. Three Ässät players completed a hat-trick that game.

In the 1992 SM-liiga playoffs, Ässät and Lukko met in the playoffs in the quarterfinals. It was reported that Lukko refused to sell tickets to Ässät fans. In response, Ässät did not sell tickets to Lukko fans. After the second game, Lukko's head coach, Matti Keinonen, was allegedly punched in the back of the head by an Ässät fan. Ässät won the playoff series 2–0. Other violence against Lukko fans has also been reported.

Ässät and Lukko met in the bronze medal game on 1 April 1995, in Rauma ice hall. Ässät beat Lukko 3–0.

On 20 February 2007, a game had three fights in a row right after a faceoff. A total of 233 penalty minutes were given during the game, including seven game misconducts.

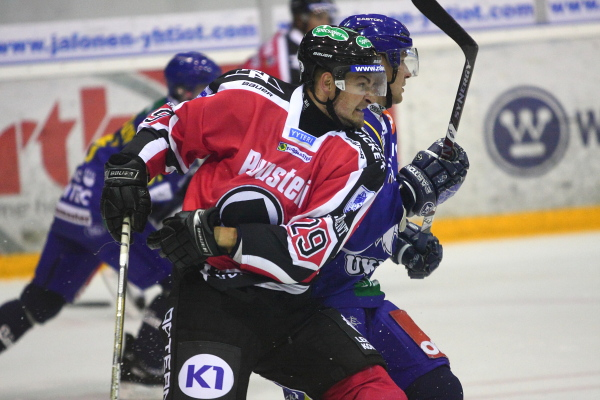
Ässät player Patrik Forsbacka, a player known for fighting and physical play, in a matchup between Ässät and Lukko.

According to the renewed series system in 2009, the 11th-placed Lukko and the 12th-placed Ässät met in the playout matches after the regular season in the second round, where the loser of the best-of-five series continued their season in the SM-liiga qualifiers, and the season of the winner ended. Lukko won the series 3–1 and Ässät went to the SM-liiga qualifiers against Mestis champion Vaasan Sport. Ässät only barely managed to keep their SM-liiga spot after the game seven.

In 2013, Lukko fans had caused a scene at the Pori central marketplace by disturbing people by shouting and making noise. Later that day, Lukko fans showed respect to Ässät during their Finnish Championship ceremony.

In 2015, Lukko's fan group, Raumam Boja, claimed that Ässät had asked them to move elsewhere when playing in Pori because they were disrupting the Ässät goaltender too much. Ässät claimed that the group was lying and the real reason for the move was safety. Later that year, Ässät's fan organization, Pataljoona, had left their flags and a banderole on a bus that later carried the Raumam Boja group in it. Reportedly RB had stolen the equipment after they found them on the bus.

Ässät and Lukko met in the first round of the 2018 SM-liiga playoffs. Ässät won the first game 2–1 and the second game 3–2 in overtime, and thus Ässät advanced to the next round.

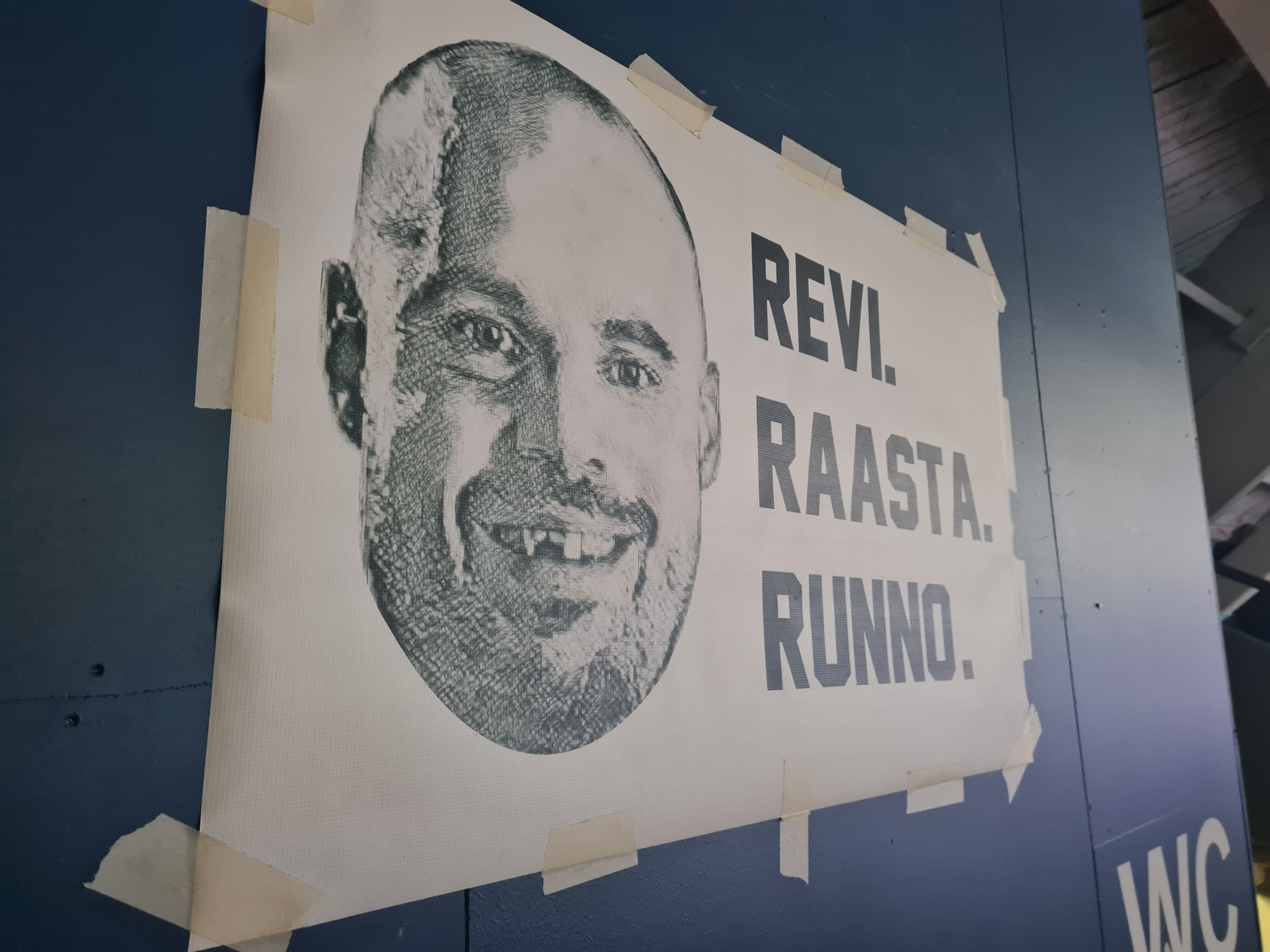
Ässät fan group Pataljoona's banner during an away game against Lukko in Rauma in 2023.

In a Satakunnan derby in 2020, Otto Kivenmäki was seriously injured when Lukko's David Němeček hit him in the head. Němeček got a seven-game suspension.

Swedish television company C More produced a four part documentary about the rivalry and the two clubs called Satakunnan kiekkoheimot (Finnish for Satakunta's hockey tribes) in 2022.

Lukko announced that it will stop playing the Satakunta regional anthem at games starting from the 2024–25 season due to Ässät fans singing the ending too loud, which was seen by Lukko's officials as an unfair advantage to Ässät players. According to Lukko's director of development, Sasu Eronen, the lyrics of the song refer more to Pori than Rauma.

== Satakunta Winter Classic 2025 ==
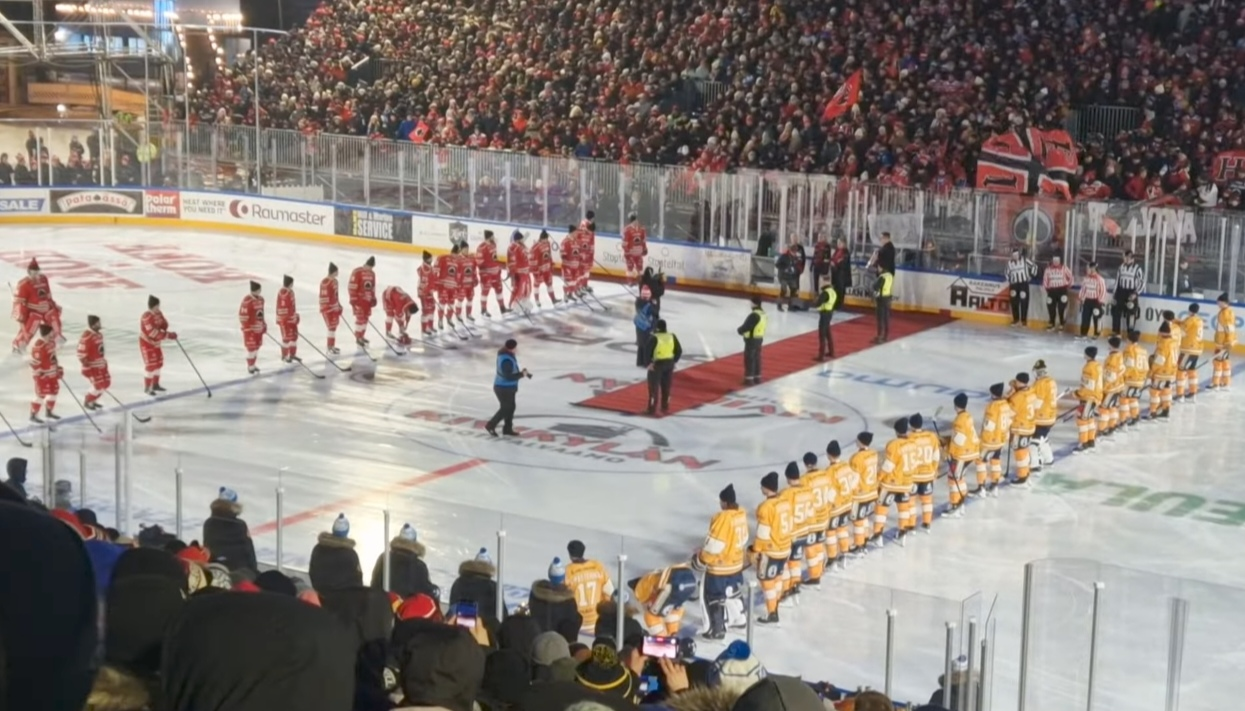
Ässät and Lukko at the Winter Classic during the Satakunta regional anthem.

Two outdoor games were played in Pori between Ässät and Lukko in January 2025. The games went by the name Satakunnan Talviklassikko or The Satakunta Winter Classic. The games were counted as normal regular season games. They were played in the Amiko-areena, which is normally used by the bandy club Narukerä. Temporary stands with a capacity of 9,000 spectators were built for the two games. A VIP area with a capacity of 2,000 people was built in the Karhuhalli sports arena next to the hockey rink. The budget for the event was reported to be over one million euros and it's going to be the first outdoor game between the two teams in 54 years.

== See also ==
- Ässät–Sport rivalry
- List of sports rivalries
- Pitsiturnaus
