= Ässät–Sport rivalry =

Ice hockey rivalry in Finland

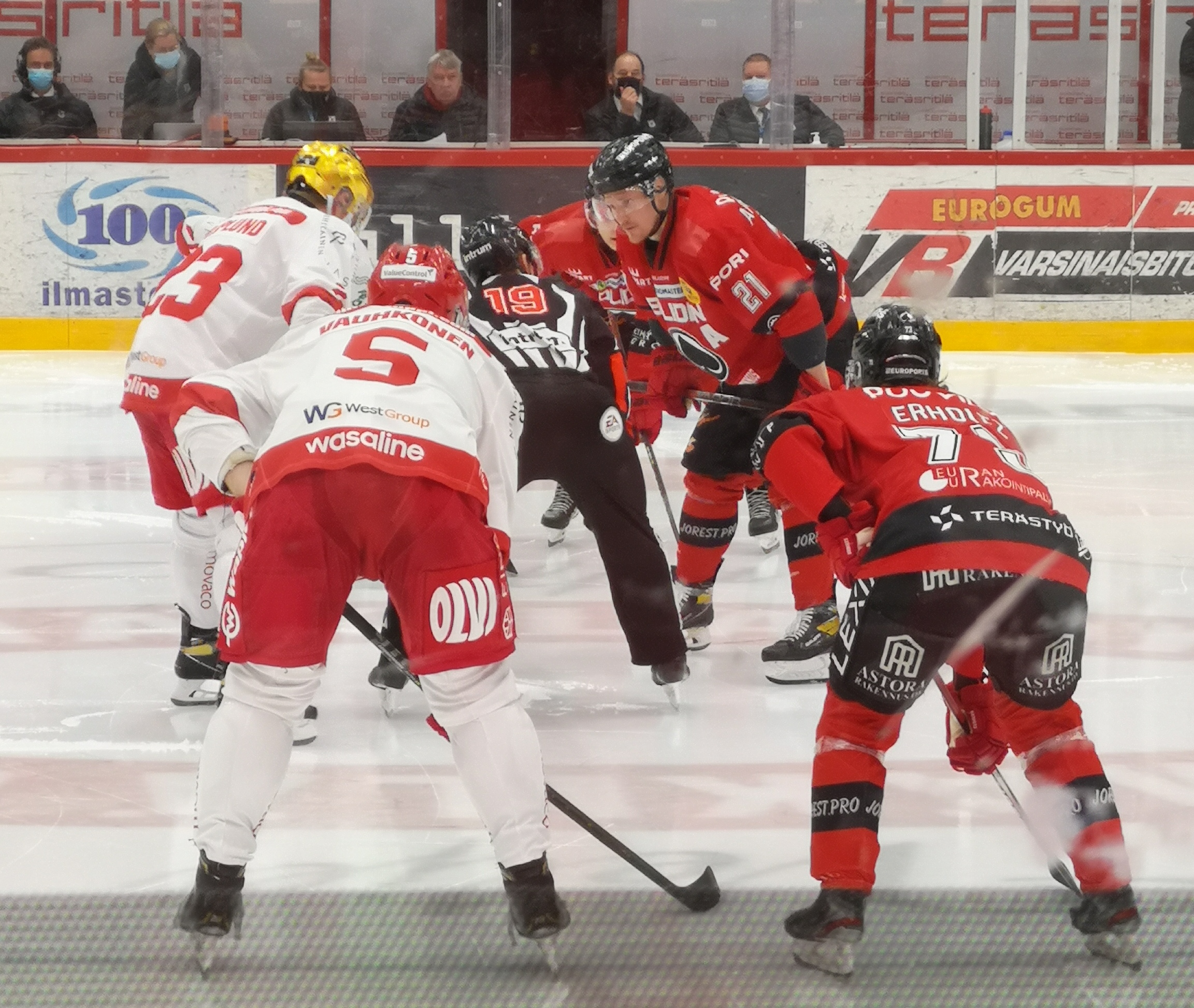
- Ässät and Sport about to take a faceoff in 2022
- Other names: Kasitien derby (Highway 8 derby)
- Sport: Ice hockey
- Teams: HC Ässät Pori; Vaasan Sport
- First meeting: October 12, 1975
- Latest meeting: February 23, 2025
- Next meeting: TBA

Statistics
- Total meetings: 54
- Postseason results: 4–3 (ÄSS)
- Largest victory: ÄSS 10–4 SPO; December 11, 1975
- Current win streak: SPO W1

The Ässät–Sport rivalry, also known as the Kasitien derby, is an ice hockey rivalry between the HC Ässät Pori and Vaasan Sport, two professional ice hockey clubs in Finland. The rivalry has its roots in the 2009 SM-liiga qualifiers, where Ässät beat Sport in seven games to keep their SM-liiga spot. Sport was later promoted to the SM-liiga in 2014.

== History ==
The first game between Ässät and Sport was played in the 1975–76 SM-liiga season, but it wasn't considered a rivalry yet. The first game between the clubs ended in Ässät's 10–5 victory. The clubs faced each other a total of four times in the season, Ässät winning all four of the games. Sport was relegated after the season.

Ässät and Sport met in the 2009 SM-liiga qualifiers. Sport played in the second tier Mestis, and Ässät played in the SM-liiga. Ässät beat Sport in seven games, winning the last game 3–0. After the series, Ässät fined Sport for €2,000 for broken benches in the arena. The biggest scandal happened when Sport's coach Juhani Tamminen commented on the series and the whole league system in a press conference. Tamminen blamed the league for Sport's loss in the series, calling it unfair. Tamminen had also threatened Ässät's assistant coach Pasi Kaukoranta by telling him that he will rip his head off after Kaukoranta had allegedly provoked him. Tamminen was fined €2,500 by the league.

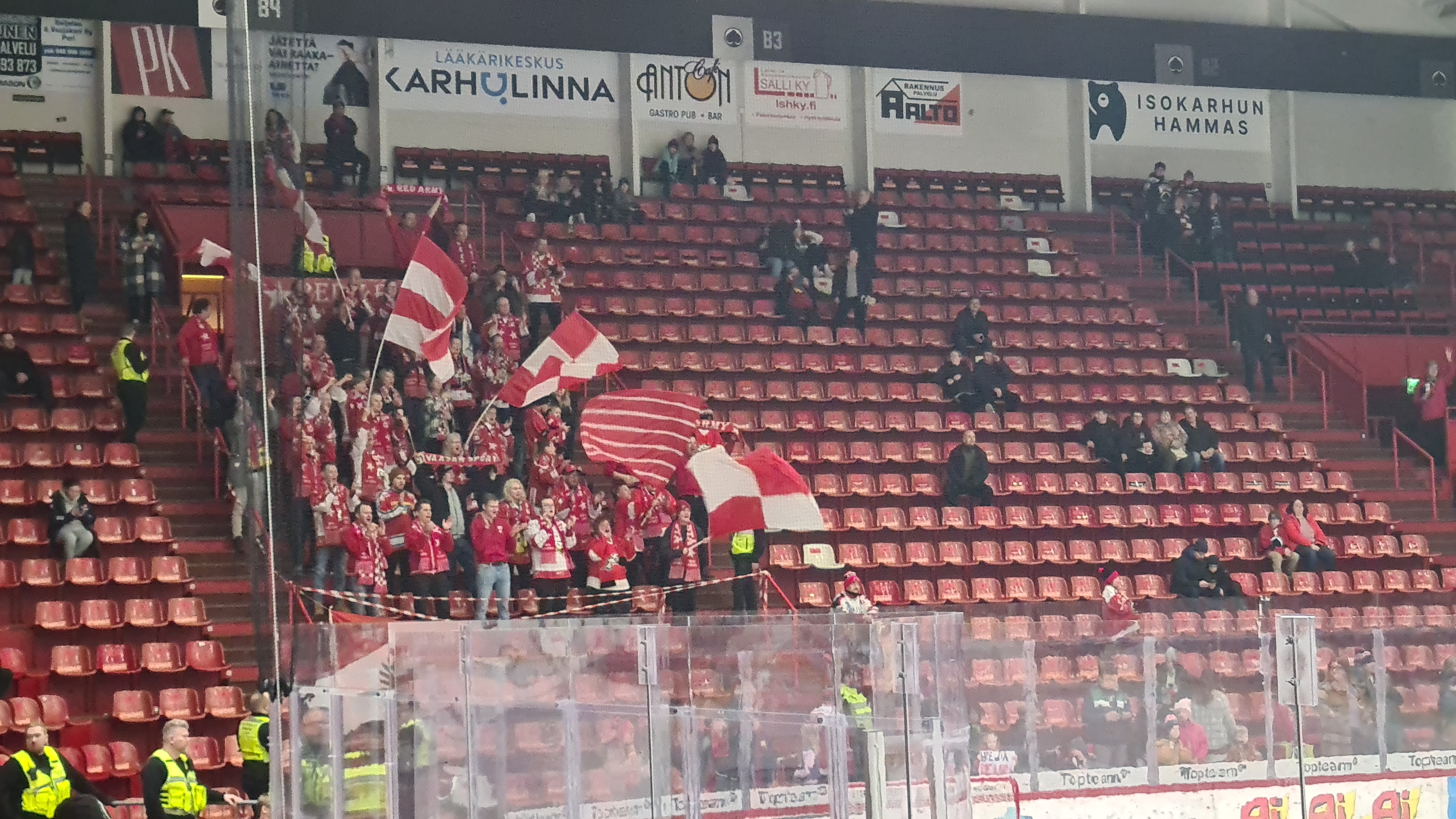
Vaasan Sport fans in Pori after a Kasitien derby game

In 2024, Sport played Ässät at home to decide the last spot in the playoffs. The winning team would go to the playoffs and the loser would just miss them. Sport won the game 3–2 and Ässät missed the playoffs by two points.

In the 2024-2025 season 500 Sport supporters came to Pori for the second Kasitien Derby of the season. The match ended with Ässät winning in overtime. The Sport supporters had broken the benches and stolen one of the flags of the Ässät supporters during the match.

== See also ==
- Satakunnan derby
