= Tommi Kerttula =

- Born: April 14, 1975 (age 49); Hämeenlinna, Finland
- Position: Defence
- Played for: KooKoo U20; HPK U20

Tommi Kerttula (born 17 April 1975) is a Finnish former ice hockey player. Now he works as the sports manager of Porin Ässät in Liiga.
