= Toni Häppölä =

Finnish ice hockey player

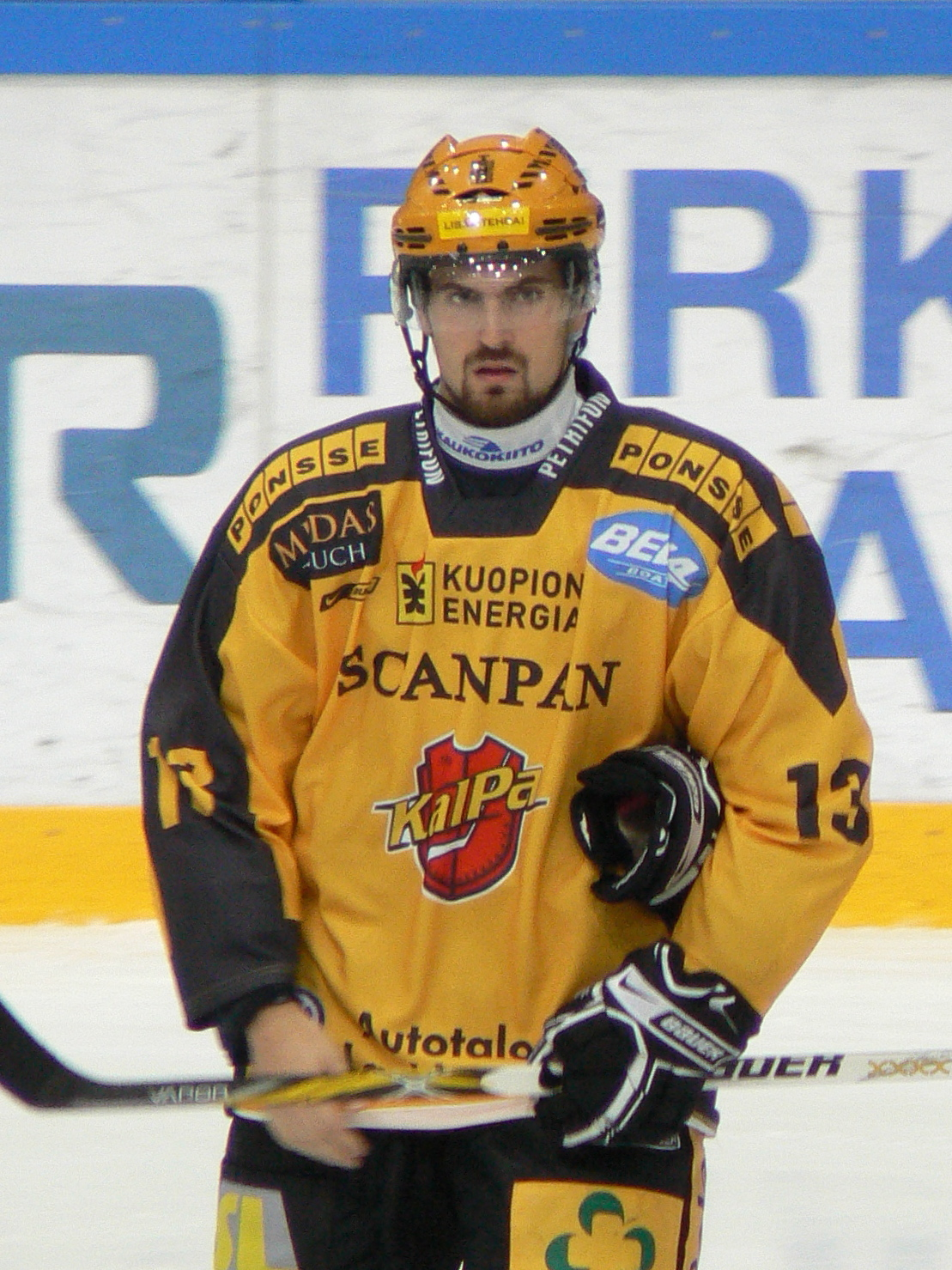
- Born: April 9, 1981 (age 44) Helsinki, Finland
- Height: 6 ft 2 in (188 cm)
- Weight: 203 lb (92 kg; 14 st 7 lb)
- Position: Forward
- Shoots: Left
- SM-liiga team: HPK
- Playing career: 2001–present

Toni Häppölä (born April 9, 1981) is a Finnish professional ice hockey forward who most recently played for HPK of the SM-liiga during the 2010–11 season.
