= Pitsiturnaus =

Ice hockey tournament in Finland

- Sport: Ice hockey
- Founded: 1993
- Founder: Lukko
- First season: 1993
- No. of teams: 6
- Country: Finland
- Venue: Kivikylän Areena
- Most recent champion: SaiPa (3) (2025)
- Most titles: Lukko (11)

Notes
- Foreign teams may participate, the participating teams can change every year

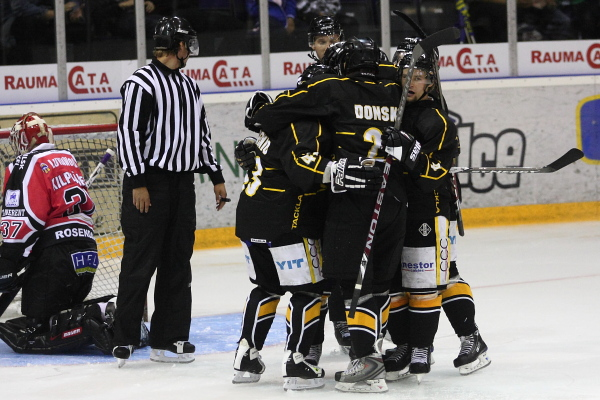
Oulun Kärpät players celebrating a goal in the 2009 tournament

The Pitsiturnaus is an ice hockey tournament held in Rauma, Finland. It is held around the time of the Pitsiviikko. The tournament has been played since 1993. The tournament is held in the Kivikylän Areena, home arena of Lukko of the Liiga.

== History ==
The participants of the tournament have traditionally been Rauma Lukko, Porin Ässät and TPS. Rauman Lukko has the most titles in the tournament, having won it ten times. The first foreign team in the tournament was the Russian CSK VVS Samara in 1999. The only foreign winner is from 2002, when the Russian HC CSKA Moscow won the tournament. The same team also took part in the tournament in 2003, when Lukko defeated them in the final. In both years, the Moscow team was coached by Vasily Tikhonov, the former coach of Ässät and Lukko.

In 2006, the tournament was not played due to renovations at the arena, but at that time the opening tournament of Äijänsuo was played, where HC Pardubice won over Ässät in the final 7–3. Lukko came in third after defeating the Blues 5–4.

Since 2010, the tournament has been held after Pitsiviikko, as the rules of the Finnish Elite League prohibit practice games in July, at the end of which Pitsiviikko is. Today, the Pitsiturnaus is played on the first Friday in August.

== Format ==
Six teams take part in the tournament. Teams are drawn into divisions of three, where they play once against each other. The top two from both divisions will advance to the semi-finals, with the winners going to the finals. The playing time in the first round and semi-finals is 2x15 min and in the final 2x20 min.

Ässät and Lukko are always placed into the same division and they traditionally play against each other at 10 am every year.

== Champions ==
List of champions:

Team	No. wins	Years
Lukko	11	1997, 1998, 2003, 2008, 2010, 2012, 2013, 2014, 2015, 2020, 2023
HC TPS	6	1993, 2001, 2005, 2009, 2016, 2017
Ässät	5	1994, 1995, 1999, 2004, 2022
Pelicans	3	2011, 2018, 2019
SaiPa	3	2021, 2024, 2025
Tappara	1	2007
HC CSKA Moscow	1	2002
Ilves	1	1996
Kärpät	1	2000
