= Jesse Joensuu =

Finnish ice hockey player (born 1987)

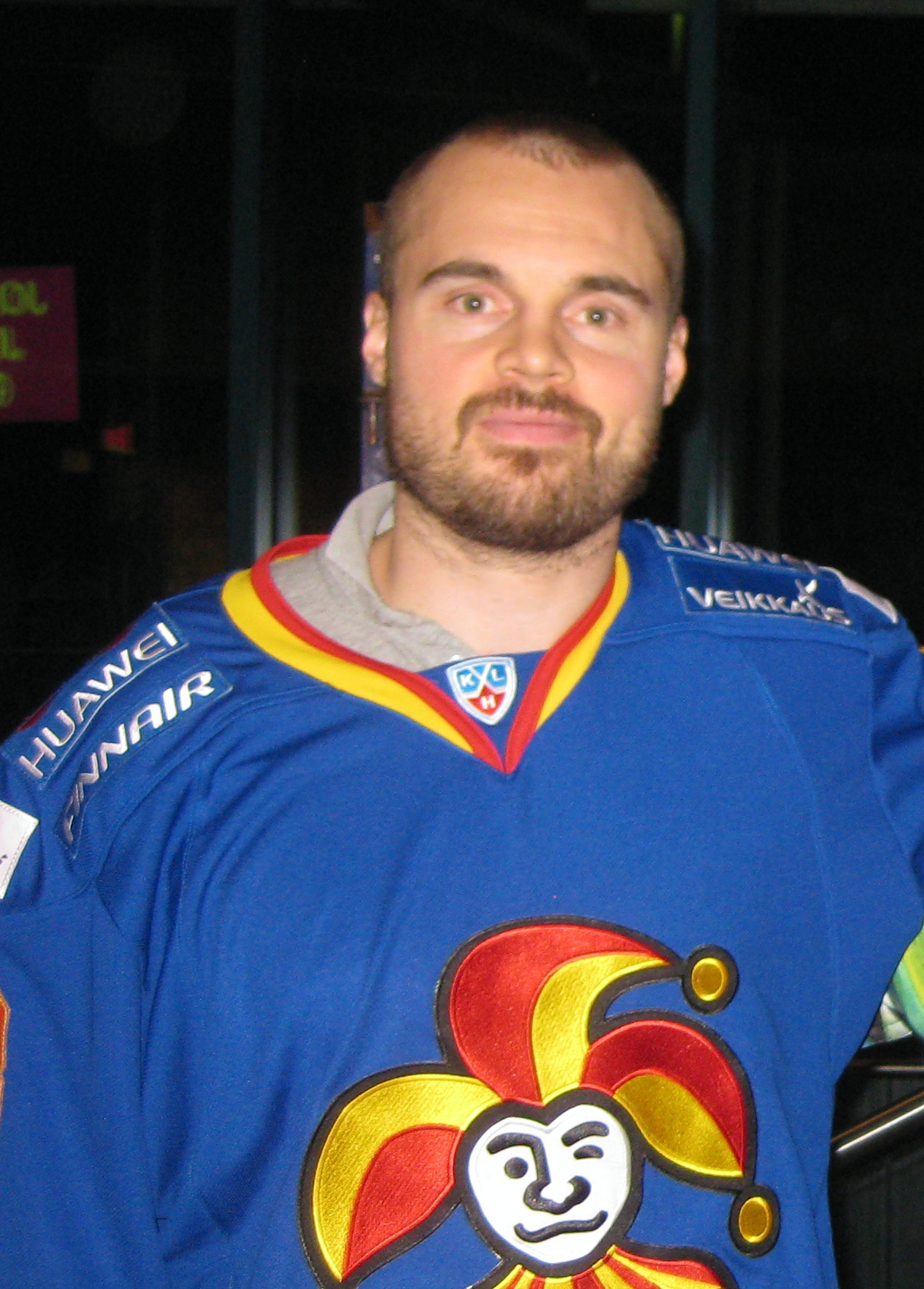
- Joensuu in December 2015
- Born: 5 October 1987 (age 38) Pori, Finland
- Height: 6 ft 4 in (193 cm)
- Weight: 210 lb (95 kg; 15 st 0 lb)
- Position: Left wing
- Shot: Left
- Played for: New York Islanders; HV71; Edmonton Oilers; SC Bern; Jokerit; Ässät
- National team: Finland
- NHL draft: 60th overall, 2006; New York Islanders
- Playing career: 2004–2024

Jesse Matias Joensuu (born 5 October 1987) is a Finnish former professional ice hockey winger who finished his career with Porin Ässät of the SM-liiga. Joensuu served as the team's captain for the 2023–24 season.

Joensuu has previously played for the New York Islanders and the Edmonton Oilers in the National Hockey League (NHL)

== Playing career ==
=== Porin Ässät (2003–2008) ===
Joensuu, who previously played in Ässät's junior teams, played his professional SM-liiga debut with Ässät against SaiPa in September 2003 when he was only 15 years old. In his debut season, Joensuu played in six games with the representative team. In the following season, Joensuu had an almost constant spot as a winger in the fourth line and he played 39 matches, in which he scored one goal and assisted one. Although the expected quick breakthrough did not come, Joensuu's role in the Ässät team grew year by year.

The NHL club New York Islanders drafted Joensuu in the second round of the 2006 draft at number 60. In 2007, the Islanders sent a coach to Pori to refine Joensuu's skating technique with private lessons.

In his last SM-liiga season (2007–08), the now 20-year-old Joensuu lived up to expectations and scored plenty of points despite the Ässät's placement at the bottom of the league. Joensuu was also chosen once as the best young player in the SM-liiga. After selling the team's number one center, Toni Häppölä, Joensuu became Ässät's best scorer.

After his season with Ässät, Joensuu played one game with the Bridgeport Sound Tigers, the Islanders' American Hockey League (AHL) affiliate.

=== New York Islanders (2008–2011) ===
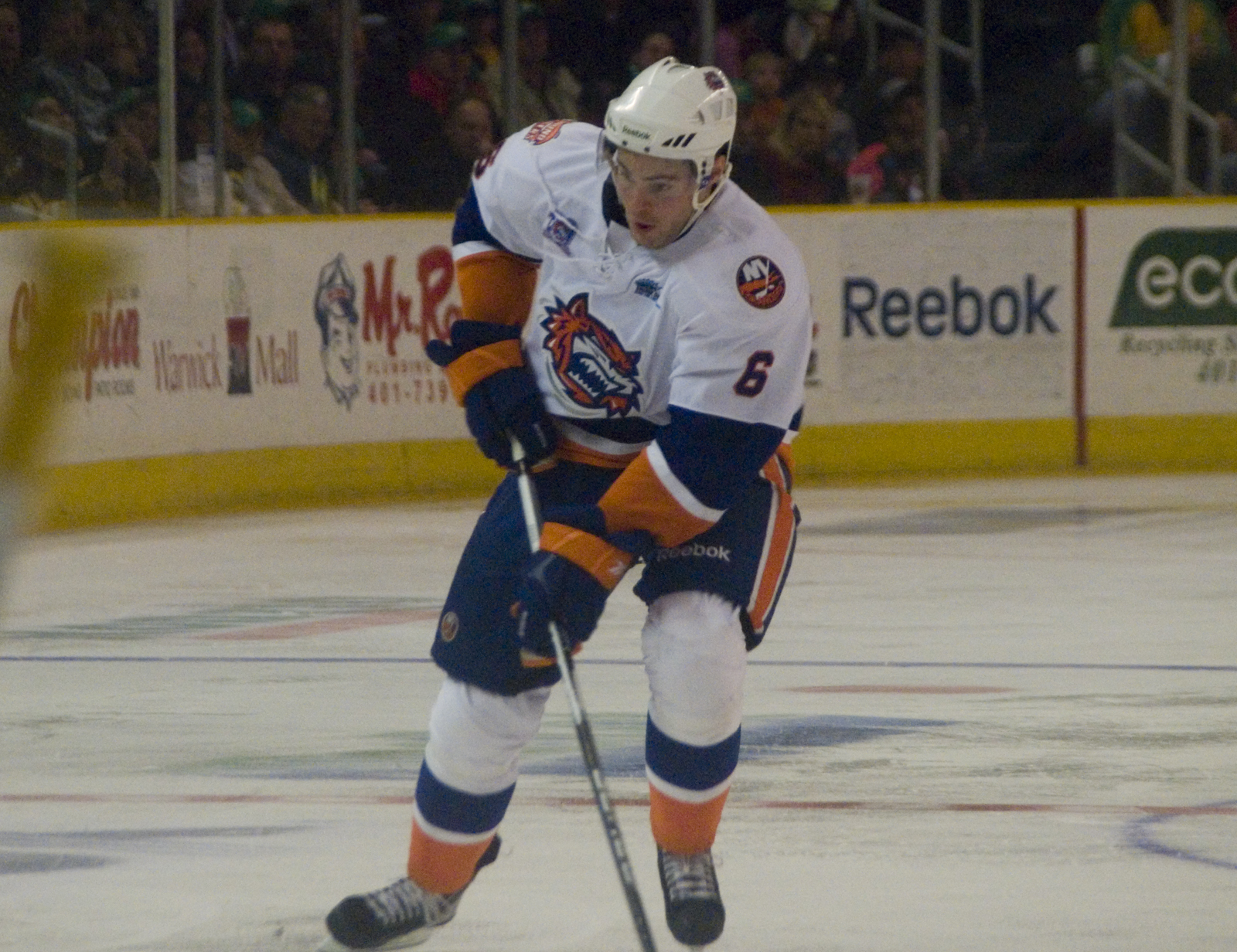
Joensuu with the Bridgeport Sound Tigers in 2011

In the spring of 2008, Joensuu signed a three-year contract with the Islanders. Joensuu started the 2008–09 season on the affiliate team in Bridgeport in the AHL, although he managed to appear in a few training games in the Islanders' jersey. Joensuu was placed into the Islanders lineup on 2 March 2009 for a match against the Colorado Avalanche in which scored a goal in his first NHL game.

In the 2010–2011 season, Joensuu finally played more games in the NHL than in the AHL, despite his two-way contract. He made his season debut with the Islanders on 20 November in a home game in a losing cause against the Florida Panthers. He received a two-way contract offer from the Islanders in order for the Islanders to retain his player rights.

=== Return to Europe, HV71 and Ässät (2011–2013) ===
On 1 July 2011, Joensuu left the Islanders organization as a restricted free agent and signed a two-year deal with Swedish club HV71 of the Elitserien. With the intention of developing his offense as a power forward Joensuu scored 29 points in 50 games during the 2011–12 season.

Joensuu, with a clause for release from HV71 to the NHL, opted a return to the Islanders on a one-year deal on 15 June 2012. With the impending 2012–13 NHL lockout taking affect, Joensuu signed a contract for the duration of the dispute with hometown team Ässät on 18 September 2012. At the end of the SM-liiga season, Ässät won the Kanada-malja championship.

=== Edmonton Oilers (2013–2015) ===
On 5 July 2013, Joensuu signed as a free agent to a two-year contract to return to the NHL with the Edmonton Oilers. During the final season of his contract in 2014–15 season, and unable to secure a position on the checking lines of the struggling Oilers, Joensuu was loaned to Swiss club, SC Bern on 12 December 2014, for the remainder of the campaign.

=== Second return to Europe (2015–present) ===
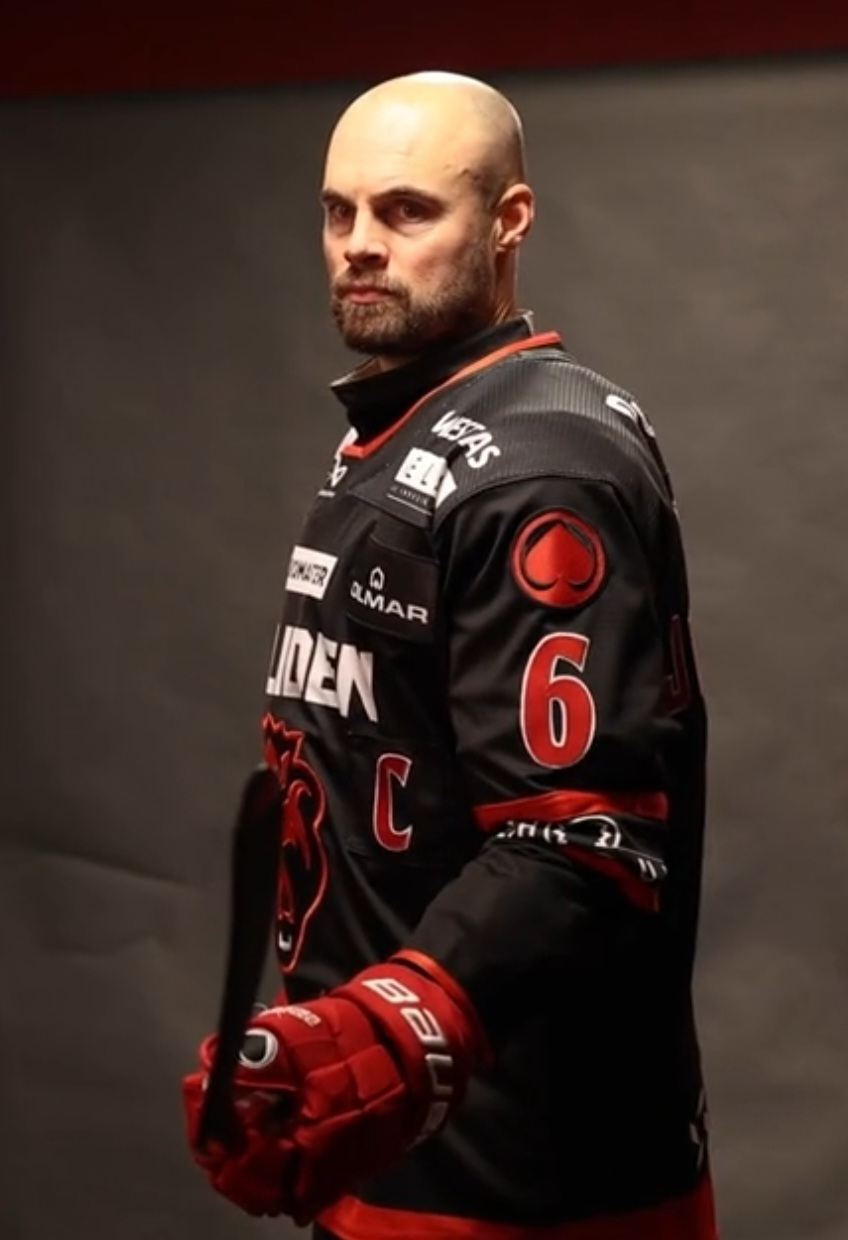
Jesse Joensuu with the Porin Ässät in 2023

For the 2015–2016 season, Joensuu signed a two-year contract with the KHL team Jokerit. In November 2016, Joensuu signed a three-year contract extension with the club that lasted until spring 2020. In April 2020, Joensuu signed a two-year contract extension with the team.

In April 2022, Jesse Joensuu's hometown club Porin Ässät announced that they had signed a two-year contract with Joensuu. He became the Ässät captain. Joensuu played a full season of 60 games and scored 19 points.

Joensuu continued as the captain of Ässät for the 2023–24 SM-liiga season. After the team's season ended, Joensuu announced his retirement.

== Personal life ==
Joensuu played football for Musan Salama as a junior. He is the son of Finnish association football manager Jouni Joensuu.

== Career statistics ==
=== Regular season and playoffs ===
			Regular season					Playoffs
Season	Team	League	GP	G	A	Pts	PIM	GP	G	A	Pts	PIM
2002–03	Porin Ässät	FIN U18	26	8	10	18	53	3	1	2	3	0
2002–03	Porin Ässät	FIN U20	3	0	1	1	2	—	—	—	—	—
2003–04	Porin Ässät	FIN U18	2	2	0	2	2	—	—	—	—	—
2003–04	Porin Ässät	FIN U20	28	7	9	16	18	3	0	1	1	2
2003–04	Porin Ässät	SM-liiga	6	0	0	0	0	—	—	—	—	—
2004–05	Porin Ässät	FIN U20	13	7	8	15	14	—	—	—	—	—
2004–05	Porin Ässät	SM-liiga	39	1	1	2	4	—	—	—	—	—
2005–06	Porin Ässät	SM-liiga	51	4	8	12	57	14	0	2	2	12
2005–06	FInland U20	Mestis	2	1	0	1	12	—	—	—	—	—
2006–07	Porin Ässät	FIN U20	5	2	1	3	6	—	—	—	—	—
2006–07	Porin Ässät	SM-liiga	52	9	17	26	74	—	—	—	—	—
2006–07	Suomi U20	Mestis	2	0	2	2	6	—	—	—	—	—
2007–08	Porin Ässät	SM-liiga	56	17	18	35	89	—	—	—	—	—
2007–08	Bridgeport Sound Tigers	AHL	1	0	0	0	0	—	—	—	—	—
2008–09	Bridgeport Sound Tigers	AHL	70	20	19	39	58	5	2	1	3	4
2008–09	New York Islanders	NHL	7	1	2	3	4	—	—	—	—	—
2009–10	Bridgeport Sound Tigers	AHL	70	14	34	48	66	5	0	2	2	6
2009–10	New York Islanders	NHL	11	1	0	1	4	—	—	—	—	—
2010–11	Bridgeport Sound Tigers	AHL	35	8	16	24	31	—	—	—	—	—
2010–11	New York Islanders	NHL	42	6	3	9	33	—	—	—	—	—
2011–12	HV71	SEL	50	13	16	29	58	6	2	1	3	37
2012–13	Porin Ässät	SM-liiga	24	11	14	25	83	—	—	—	—	—
2012–13	New York Islanders	NHL	7	0	2	2	6	1	0	0	0	0
2013–14	Edmonton Oilers	NHL	42	3	2	5	16	—	—	—	—	—
2014–15	Edmonton Oilers	NHL	20	2	2	4	14	—	—	—	—	—
2014–15	SC Bern	NLA	15	2	5	7	30	8	2	1	3	8
2015–16	Jokerit	KHL	54	9	16	25	70	6	2	3	5	54
2016–17	Jokerit	KHL	50	15	13	28	90	4	0	0	0	10
2017–18	Jokerit	KHL	49	7	9	16	64	11	2	2	4	10
2018–19	Jokerit	KHL	60	19	18	37	83	6	1	0	1	6
2019–20	Jokerit	KHL	60	15	16	31	96	6	1	1	2	6
2020–21	Jokerit	KHL	44	11	9	20	36	4	0	1	1	4
2021–22	Jokerit	KHL	32	2	4	6	24	—	—	—	—	—
2022–23	Porin Ässät	SM-liiga	60	9	10	19	48	8	3	0	3	4
SM-liiga totals			288	51	68	119	355	22	3	2	5	16
NHL totals			129	13	11	24	77	1	0	0	0	0
KHL totals			349	78	85	163	463	37	6	7	13	90

=== International ===
Medal record

Representing Finland

Ice hockey

World Championships
Gold medal – first place	2011 Slovakia	

World Junior Championships
Bronze medal – third place	2006 Vancouver	

Year	Team	Event	Result	GP	G	A	Pts	PIM
2004	Finland	WJC18	7th	4	0	0	0	6
2005	Finland	WJC	5th	6	1	0	1	2
2005	Finland	WJC18	7th	6	2	1	3	0
2006	Finland	WJC	3rd place, bronze medalist(s)	7	2	2	4	8
2007	Finland	WJC	6th	6	1	1	2	14
2012	Finland	WC	4th	9	2	3	5	24
Junior totals				29	6	4	10	30
Senior totals				9	2	3	5	24

Sporting positions
Preceded by Jarno Kärki	Porin Ässät captain 2022–2024	Succeeded by TBD
