= Vasily Tikhonov (ice hockey) =

Russian ice hockey coach (1958–2013)

Vasili Viktorovich Tikhonov (13 May 1958 – 7 August 2013) was a Russian ice hockey coach.

== Biography ==
Tikhonov was born and died in Moscow and was the son of legendary Soviet ice hockey coach Viktor Tikhonov. He started his career in the 1980s by coaching the youth teams of Dinamo Riga. In 1990 he became the head coach of Finnish SM-liiga side Ässät Pori.

After the 1992–1993 season Tikhonov moved to North America and worked as an assistant coach with the San Jose Sharks in the National Hockey League and later as a head coach with the Kansas City Blades and Kentucky Thoroughblades of the American Hockey League.

In 1998 he returned to Europe and coached several teams in Finland, Switzerland and Russia.

His son Viktor Tikhonov is a former NHL player with the Arizona Coyotes and Chicago Blackhawks who currently plays for Ak Bars Kazan in the KHL.

Vasily Tikhonov died on 7 August 2013 in Moscow as he fell from his fourth-floor apartment window. Tikhonov was cutting a hole to a plastic screen that covered his building's facade because of repairs. He is survived by his wife Tatjana, his daughter Tatjana, also a hockey coach, and his son Viktor.

== Teams managed ==
- (Finland) Ässät Pori 1990–1993
- (United States) San Jose Sharks (assistant) 1993–1996
- (United States) Kansas City Blades 1995–1996
- (United States) Kentucky Thoroughblades 1996–1998
- (Finland) Lukko Rauma 1998–2001
- (Switzerland) HC Langnau 2001–2002
- (Russia) CSKA Moscow 2002–2004
- (Russia) Avangard Omsk (assistant) 2010–2011
- (Russia) Ak Bars Kazan (assistant) 2011–2012
