= 2021–22 Swiss League season =

- League: Swiss League
- Sport: Ice hockey
- Duration: September 9, 2021 – March 3, 2022
- Games: 275
- Teams: 11

Regular Season
- Season Champions: EHC Kloten

Playoffs

Swiss League champion
- Champions: EHC Kloten (1st title)
- Runners-up: EHC Olten

Swiss League seasons
- ← 2020–21 2022–23 →

The 2021–22 Swiss League season was the 75th season of Switzerland's second tier hockey league.

== Teams ==
Swiss League teams for the 2021–22 season

Team	City	Arena	Capacity
EHC Kloten	Kloten	Stimo Arena	7,624
HC La Chaux-de-Fonds	La Chaux-de-Fonds	Patinoire des Mélèzes	7,200
GCK Lions	Küsnacht	Eishalle Küsnacht	2,800
SC Langenthal	Langenthal	Schoren Halle	4,320
EHC Olten	Olten	Kleinholz Stadion	6,500
HC Sierre	Sierre	Patinoire de Graben	4,500
Hockey Thurgau	Weinfelden	Güttingersreuti	3,100
HCB Ticino Rockets	Biasca	Pista Ghiaccio Biasca	3,800
EHC Visp	Visp	Lonza Arena	5,150
EHC Winterthur	Winterthur	Zielbau Arena	3,000
EVZ Academy	Zug	Bossard Arena	1,500

== Regular season ==
The regular season started on 9 September 2021 and ended on 5 March 2022.

Pos	Team	Pld	W	OTW	OTL	L	GF	GA	GD	Pts	Qualification
1	EHC Kloten	50	40	1	4	5	217	93	+124	126	Advance to Playoffs
2	EHC Olten	50	35	1	5	9	196	94	+102	112	Advance to Playoffs
3	HC La Chaux-de-Fonds	50	30	4	4	12	195	119	+76	102	Advance to Playoffs
4	Hockey Thurgau	50	23	7	3	17	140	121	+19	86	Advance to Playoffs
5	SC Langenthal	50	21	10	3	16	169	151	+18	86	Advance to Playoffs
6	EHC Visp	50	23	3	4	20	158	134	+24	79	Advance to Playoffs
7	HC Sierre	50	19	5	3	23	144	151	−7	70	Advance to Pre-Playoffs
8	GCK Lions	50	18	3	1	28	142	175	−33	61	Advance to Pre-Playoffs
9	EVZ Academy	50	9	2	5	34	85	186	−101	36	Advance to Pre-Playoffs
10	EHC Winterthur	50	8	2	6	34	95	206	−111	34	Advance to Pre-Playoffs
11	HCB Ticino Rockets	50	7	4	4	35	117	228	−111	33	

Source: Swiss League
Rules for classification: 1) points; 2) a higher number of wins in the regular time; 3) a higher number of wins in overtime and shootouts; 4) goal difference; 5) number of goals scored; 6) drawing of lots.

=== Statistics ===
==== Scoring leaders ====
The following shows the top ten players who led the league in points, at the conclusion of the regular season. If two or more skaters are tied (i.e. same number of points, goals and played games), all of the tied skaters are shown.

Player	Team	GP	G	A	Pts	+/–	PIM
(Canada) Éric Faille	EHC Kloten	48	24	49	73	+43	18
(Canada) Garry Nunn	EHC Olten	45	32	37	69	+52	10
(Canada) Jonathan Ang	Hockey Thurgau	50	27	37	64	+28	44
(Norway) Sondre Olden	HC La Chaux-de-Fonds	44	22	42	64	+33	13
(Switzerland) Marc Marchon	EHC Kloten	45	26	36	62	+38	86
(Czech Republic) Dion Knelsen	EHC Olten	41	17	45	62	+36	8
(Sweden) Robin Figren	EHC Kloten	47	26	34	60	+36	18
(United States) Tim Coffman	SC Langenthal	50	19	39	58	+10	44
(Switzerland) Ian Derungs	Hockey Thurgau	50	37	20	57	+24	12
(Slovakia) Stanislav Horanský	EHC Olten	47	21	36	57	+42	12

==== Leading goaltenders ====
The following shows the top five goaltenders who led the league in goals against average, provided that they have played at least 40% of their team's minutes, at the conclusion of the regular season.

Player	Team(s)	GP	TOI	GA	Sv%	GAA
(Switzerland) Silas Matthys	EHC Olten	22	1230:29	34	93.06	1.66
(Switzerland) Simon Rytz	EHC Olten	31	1779:40	53	93.29	1.79
(Switzerland) Sandro Zurkirchen	EHC Kloten	31	1851:59	58	92.35	1.88
(Switzerland) Bryan Rüegger	Hockey Thurgau	25	1383:46	48	91.24	2.08
(Switzerland) Nicola Aeberhard	HC La Chaux-de-Fonds	27	1411:54	52	91.73	2.21

== Playoffs ==
=== Bracket ===
Pre-playoffs (best-of-3)
7	HC Sierre	2
10	EHC Winterthur	0
8	GCK Lions	2
9	EVZ Academy	0

Quarter-finals (best-of-7)
1	EHC Kloten	4
8	GCK Lions	0
2	EHC Olten	4
7	HC Sierre	1
3	HC La Chaux-de-Fonds	4
6	EHC Visp	1
4	Hockey Thurgau	4
5	SC Langenthal	1

Semi-finals (best-of-7)
1	EHC Kloten	4
4	Hockey Thurgau	2
(Pairings are re-seeded after the first and second round)
2	EHC Olten	4
3	HC La Chaux-de-Fonds	2

Finals (best-of-7)
1	EHC Kloten	4
2	EHC Olten	1

=== Pre-playoffs ===
==== (7) HC Sierre vs. (10) EHC Winterthur ====
7 March	HC Sierre	4-3	EHC Winterthur	Patinoire de Graben, Sierre	Recap
Bezina (Puide, Bonvin) - 10:43		First period	No scoring
No scoring		Second period	5:17 - Zwissler (Haldimann, Pozzorini); 13:06 - Wilkins (Gerber, Pompei) (PP1)
Berthoud (Bernazzi, Puide) - 6:21; A. Montandon (M. Montandon, Castonguay) - 7:08 (PP1); Castonguay (Bezina) - 7:41		Third period	13:43 - Hunziker (Staiger, Lekic) (PP1)
Remo Giovannini ( 33 saves / 37 shots )		Goalie stats	Andri Henauer ( 26 saves / 29 shots )

9 March	EHC Winterthur	2-3	OT	HC Sierre	Zielbau Arena, Winterthur	Recap
19:05 - A. Montandon		First period		Zwissler (Thévoz) - 15:45
No scoring		Second period		No scoring
18:10 - A. Montandon (Castonguay, M. Montandon) (PP1)		Third period		Zwissler - 6:13
2:03 - Rimann (A. Montandon, Maillard)		First overtime period		No scoring
Andri Henauer ( 29 saves / 32 shots )		Goalie stats		Remo Giovannini ( 25 saves / 27 shots )

HC Sierre won the series 2–0

==== (8) GCK Lions vs. (9) EVZ Academy ====
7 March	GCK Lions	5-2	EVZ Academy	Eishalle Küsnacht, Küsnacht	Recap
Schlagenhauf (Küng, Capaul) - 9:11; Graf (Burger, Capaul) - 15:46		First period	No scoring
Casutt (Büsser, Mettler) - 10:37; Hayes (Büsser, Casutt) - 16:24		Second period	11:37 - Gradin 11:44 - Halberstadt
Guebey (EN) - 16:48		Third period	No scoring
Robin Zumbühl ( 29 saves / 31 shots )		Goalie stats	Lucas Rötheli ( 48 saves / 52 shots )

9 March	EVZ Academy	1-2	2OT	GCK Lions	Bossard Arena, Zug	Recap
Wüest (Stehli, Hofer) - 18:43		First period		No scoring
No scoring		Second period		No scoring
17:12 - Mettler		Third period		No scoring
28:09 - Hayes (Büsser, Henry) (PP1)		Second overtime period		No scoring
Robin Meyer ( 37 saves / 39 shots )		Goalie stats		Robin Zumbühl( 35 saves / 36 shots )

GCK Lions won the series 2–0

=== Quarter-Finals ===
==== (1) EHC Kloten vs. (8) GCK Lions ====
13 March	EHC Kloten	6-3	GCK Lions	Stimo Arena, Kloten	Recap
No scoring		First period	No scoring
Ganz (Figren, Faille) - 4:09		Second period	10:58 - Aeschlimann (Baechler, Schlagenhauf)
Altorfer (Spiller, Kellenberger) (PP1) - 9:38; Ganz (Marchon) - 10:12; Faille - 11:41; Spiller (Kellenberger, Altorfer) - 14:41; Spiller (Faille) (EN) - 19:48		Third period	3:32 - Berri (Backman, Küng) (PP1); 19:42 - Berri (Capaul, Backman)
Sandro Zurkirchen ( 20 saves / 23 shots )		Goalie stats	Robin Zumbühl ( 52 saves / 57 shots )

15 March	GCK Lions	1-6	EHC Kloten	Eishalle Küsnacht, Küsnacht	Recap
4:30 - Marchon (Spiller, Figren); 6:48 - Spiller (Faille, Figren); 19:49 - Meyer (Altorfer, Nodari)		First period	No scoring
No scoring		Second period	Berri (Meier, Backman) (PP1) - 4:30
10:21 - Faille (Nodari, Seiler); 10:48 - Figren (Marchon, Faille) (PP1); 13:48 - Meyer (Knellwolf, Faille) (PP1)		Third period	No scoring
Sandro Zurkirchen ( 22 saves / 23 shots )		Goalie stats	Robin Zumbühl ( 14 saves / 17 shots ) Jeffrey Meier ( 19 saves / 22 shots )

17 March	EHC Kloten	5-4	GCK Lions	Stimo Arena, Kloten	Recap
Altorfer (Marchon, Ganz) - 7:47; Kindschi (Figren, Faille) (PP1) - 13:43		First period	2:06 - Graf (Küng, Backman) (PP1); 9:18 - Capaul (Truog, Burger)
Obrist (Figren, Ness) (PP1) - 14:39		Second period	No scoring
Altorfer (Marchon, Meyer) - 6:28; Altorfer (Marchon, Seiler) - 19:06		Third period	13:49 - Braun (Meier, Suter); 18:32 - Backman (Aeschlimann)
Sandro Zurkirchen ( 22 saves / 26 shots )		Goalie stats	Jeffrey Meier ( 29 saves / 34 shots )

19 March	GCK Lions	2-3	EHC Kloten	Eishalle Küsnacht, Küsnacht	Recap
No scoring		First period	No scoring
2:51 - Küng (Aeschlimann, Backman)		Second period	Ganz (Faille, Figren) - 14:45
9:10 - Burger (Backman, Aeschlimann)		Third period	Seiler (Meyer, Zurkirchen) - 6:00; Nodari (Figren, Kellenberger) - 11:40
Robin Zumbühl ( 40 saves / 43 shots )		Goalie stats	Sandro Zurkirchen ( 28 saves / 30 shots )

EHC Kloten won the series 4–0

==== (2) EHC Olten vs. (7) HC Sierre ====
13 March	EHC Olten	8-2	HC Sierre	Kleinholz Stadion, Olten	Recap
Hüsler (Mosimann, Fuhrer) - 6:17; Langenegger (Sterchi, Leeger) (PP1) - 13:00		First period	No scoring
Nunn (Horanský, Knelsen) (PP1) - 7:48		Second period	1:30 - Castonguay (Beauregard, M. Montandon) (PP1); 10:45 - Volejnicek (Beauregard, Castonguay)
Lhoták (Horanský, Nunn) (PP1) - 3:24; Nunn (Knelsen, Horanský) - 6:45; Nunn (Horanský, Scheidegger) - 11:58; Weder (Langenegger, Forget) (PP1) - 14:20; Forget (Sterchi, Leeger) (PP1) - 56:18		Third period	No scoring
Simon Rytz ( 18 saves / 20 shots )		Goalie stats	Remo Giovannini ( 60 saves / 68 shots )

15 March	HC Sierre	2-4	EHC Olten	Patinoire de Graben, Sierre	Recap
4:51 - Puide (Bernazzi)		First period	Forget (Sterchi, Scheidegger) - 19:19
No scoring		Second period	11:48 - Knelsen (Scheidegger, Nunn) (PP1); 17:59 - Nunn (Lhoták, Knelsen)
M. Montandon (Castonguay, A. Montandon) - 14:32		Third period	5:50 - Wyss (Hüsler, Scheidegger) (PP1)
Remo Giovannini ( 34 saves / 38 shots )		Goalie stats	Simon Rytz ( 23 saves / 25 shots )

17 March	EHC Olten	8-2	HC Sierre	Kleinholz Stadion, Olten	Recap
Forget (Sterchi, Lhoták) - 4:32 Joggi (Langenegger, Elsener) - 8:49; Scheidegger (Sterchi, Nunn) (PP2) - 15:15		First period	No scoring
Weder (Lüthi, Joggi) - 1:23 Nunn (Horanský, Eigenmann) - 5:31; Nunn (Hüsler, Lüthi) - 18:43		Second period	16:31 - Volejnicek (Dolana, Castonguay)
Wyss - 6:57 Langenegger (Forget, Elsener) (PP1) - 19:59		Third period	11:01 - Bernazzi (Bonvin)
Simon Rytz ( 31 saves / 33 shots )		Goalie stats	Remo Giovannini ( 14 saves / 19 shots ) Noah In-Albon ( 13 saves / 16 shots )

19 March	HC Sierre	4-1	EHC Olten	Patinoire de Graben, Sierre	Recap
17:57 - Castonguay (Beauregard, Rimann)		First period	No scoring
2:02 - Bonvin		Second period	No scoring
1:12 - A. Montandon (Wyniger, Volejnicek); 17:55 - Dolana (Wyniger, A. Montandon) (EN)		Third period	2:45 - Sterchi (Forget, Leeger)
Remo Giovannini ( 42 saves / 43 shots )		Goalie stats	Simon Rytz ( 33 saves / 36 shots )

21 March	EHC Olten	6-2	HC Sierre	Kleinholz Stadion, Olten	Recap
Eigenmann (Nunn, Leeger) - 9:08		First period	No scoring
Weder (Antonietti, Langenegger) - 2:13; Lhoták (Hasani, Forget) - 19:37		Second period	1:01 - Beauregard (Castonguay, M. Montandon) (PP1)
Knelsen (Nunn, Sterchi) - 0:26; Lhoták (Knelsen, Scheidegger) (PP1) - 6:59; Nunn (Sterchi, Knelsen) - 11:51		Third period	4:48 - A. Montandon (Castonguay, Meyrat
Simon Rytz ( 16 saves / 18 shots )		Goalie stats	Remo Giovannini ( 26 saves / 32 shots )

EHC Olten won the series 4–1

==== (3) HC La Chaux-de-Fonds vs. (6) EHC Visp ====
13 March	HC La Chaux-de-Fonds	2-1	EHC Visp	Patinoire des Mélèzes, La Chaux-de-Fonds	Recap
No scoring		First period	No scoring
Trettenes (Carbis, Döpfner) - 0:18; Privet (Dubois, Jaquet) - 1:49		Second period	10:51 - Klasen (Furrer, Pilet)
No scoring		Third period	No scoring
Nicola Aeberhard ( 22 saves / 23 shots )		Goalie stats	Reto Lory ( 30 saves / 32 shots )

15 March	EHC Visp	3-4	2OT	HC La Chaux-de-Fonds	Lonza Arena, Visp	Recap
8:21 - El Assaoui (Olausson, Chiriaev); 11:17 - Ritz (Riatsch, Haberstich)		First period		No scoring
17:27 - Brügger (Klasen)		Second period		Eugster (Privet, Augsburger) - 11:59; T. Andersons (Trettenes, Huntebrinker) (PP2) - 18:51
No scoring		Third period		In-Albon (Huntebrinker) - 12:25
No scoring		Second overtime period		Privet (Sējējs, Eugster) - 37:58
Reto Lory ( 59 saves / 63 shots )		Goalie stats		Nicola Aeberhard ( 44 saves / 47 shots )

17 March	HC La Chaux-de-Fonds	3-4	OT	EHC Visp	Patinoire des Mélèzes, La Chaux-de-Fonds	Recap
No scoring		First period		No scoring
Carbis (, ) - 3:05; Huntebrinker (In-Albon, Petrini) - 7:53		Second period		1:23 - Chiriaev (Furrer, Olausson)
T. Andersons - 0:49		Third period		14:07 - Ritz (Furrer, Pilet); 18:46 - Klasen (Olausson, Chiriaev) (PP1)
No scoring		First overtime period		6:27 - Chiriaev (Haberstich)
Nicola Aeberhard ( 24 saves / 28 shots )		Goalie stats		Reto Lory ( 33 saves / 36 shots )

19 March	EHC Visp	3-4	HC La Chaux-de-Fonds	Lonza Arena, Visp	Recap
14:10 - Haberstich (Pilet, Brügger) (PP1)		First period	Huntebrinker (In-Albon, Jaquet) - 18:42
0:50 - Olausson (Kuonen, Kienzle); 17:12 - Kuonen (SH1, PS)		Second period	Huntebrinker (Petrini) - 10:31
No scoring		Third period	Carbis (Achermann, Petrini) (PP1) - 15:27; Huntebrinker (Iglesias) - 16:26
Reto Lory ( 35 saves / 39 shots )		Goalie stats	Hugo Cerviño ( 36 saves / 39 shots )

21 March	HC La Chaux-de-Fonds	0-3	EHC Visp	Patinoire des Mélèzes, La Chaux-de-Fonds	Recap
No scoring		First period	14:06 - Bogdanoff (Klasen, Eggenberger)
No scoring		Second period	11:12 - Spinell (Mäder, Furrer) (SH1)
No scoring		Third period	18:05 - Olausson (Riatsch) (EN)
Nicola Aeberhard ( 24 saves / 26 shots )		Goalie stats	Reto Lory ( 23 saves / 23 shots )

24 March	EHC Visp	3-4	OT	HC La Chaux-de-Fonds	Lonza Arena, Visp	Recap
6:15 - Burgener (Mäder) 6:38 - Klasen (Pilet, Bogdanoff)		First period		Huntebrinker (T. Andersons, In-Albon) - 12:54
18:00 - Klasen (El Assaoui, Brügger)		Second period		Voirol (A. Andersson, Achermann) - 6:42 Carbis (Petrini, Achermann) (PP1) - 14:03
No scoring		Third period		No scoring
No scoring		First overtime period		Petrini (Jaquet, Trettenes) - 0:21
Reto Lory ( 30 saves / 34 shots )		Goalie stats		Viktor Östlund ( 36 saves / 39 shots )

HC La Chaux-de-Fonds won the series 4–2

==== (4) Hockey Thurgau vs. (5) SC Langenthal ====
13 March	Hockey Thurgau	4-1	SC Langenthal	Güttingersreuti, Weinfelden	Recap
Kühni (Ang, Derungs) - 9:31; Petrig (Hobi, Kühni) - 18:07		First period	No scoring
No scoring		Second period	No scoring
Ang (Derungs, Kühni) (PP1) - 12:40; Derungs (Ang, Rundqvist) (PP1) - 18:51		Third period	7:09 - Rüegsegger (Higgins, Coffman)
Luis Janett ( 17 saves / 18 shots )		Goalie stats	Pascal Caminada ( 33 saves / 37 shots )

15 March	SC Langenthal	1-4	Hockey Thurgau	Schoren Halle, Langenthal	Recap
2:15 - Törmänen (Spannring); 19:00 - Hollenstein (Baumann, Woger)		First period	No scoring
11:10 - Binias (Törmänen, Spannring)		Second period	No scoring
16:55 - Derungs (Pelletier, Ang)		Third period	Kummer (Bärtschi) - 9:49
Pascal Caminada ( 25 saves / 29 shots )		Goalie stats	Luis Janett ( 30 saves / 31 shots )

17 March	Hockey Thurgau	4-3	OT	SC Langenthal	Güttingersreuti, Weinfelden	Recap
Derungs (Binias, Pelletier) - 8:09		First period		No scoring
Derungs (Pelletier, Binias) - 7:42		Second period		1:42 - Kläy (Elo, Christen) (PP1); 9:49 - Kämpf (Elo, Coffman) (PP1)
Hobi (Derungs, Pelletier) (PP1) - 8:14		Third period		0:15 - Elo (Coffman, Tschannen) (PP2)
Woger (Kühni, Schmutz) - 16:56		First overtime period		No scoring
Luis Janett ( 39 saves / 42 shots )		Goalie stats		Pascal Caminada ( 22 saves / 26 shots )

19 March	SC Langenthal	2-1	OT	Hockey Thurgau	Schoren Halle, Langenthal	Recap
No scoring		First period		No scoring
No scoring		Second period		No scoring
2:46 - Kühni (Pelletier, Derungs) (PP1)		Third period		Elo (Coffman, Kummer) (PP1) - 16:10
No scoring		First overtime period		Elo (Kummer, Coffman) (PP1) - 13:35
Pascal Caminada ( 28 saves / 29 shots )		Goalie stats		Luis Janett ( 39 saves / 41 shots )

21 March	Hockey Thurgau	2-1	OT	SC Langenthal	Güttingersreuti, Weinfelden	Recap
No scoring		First period		14:49 - Kummer
No scoring		Second period		No scoring
Jolliet - 15:05		Third period		No scoring
Derungs (Parati) - 7:34		First overtime period		No scoring
Luis Janett ( 24 saves / 25 shots )		Goalie stats		Pascal Caminada ( 30 saves / 32 shots )

Hockey Thurgau won the series 4–1

=== Semi-Finals ===
==== (1) EHC Kloten vs. (4) Hockey Thurgau ====
28 March	EHC Kloten	2-3	OT	Hockey Thurgau	Stimo Arena, Kloten	Recap
Faille (Nodari, Melnalksnis) - 6:22		First period		14:35 - Ang (Pelletier, Rundqvist) (PP1); 19:48 - Petrig (Pelletier, Forrer) (PP1)
No scoring		Second period		No scoring
Ness (Obrist, Ganz) - 9:53		Third period		No scoring
No scoring		First overtime period		9:28 - Rundqvist (Ang) (SH1)
Sandro Zurkirchen ( 26 saves / 29 shots )		Goalie stats		Luis Janett ( 52 saves / 54 shots )

30 March	Hockey Thurgau	1-2	EHC Kloten	Güttingersreuti, Weinfelden	Recap
No scoring		First period	1:50 - Loosli (Faille, Figren) (PP1)
No scoring		Second period	10:52 - Obrist (Ness, Melnalksnis)
Hobi (Pelletier, Derungs) (PP1) - 4:40		Third period	No scoring
Luis Janett ( 28 saves / 30 shots )		Goalie stats	Tim Wolf ( 30 saves / 31 shots )

1 April	EHC Kloten	6-2	Hockey Thurgau	Stimo Arena, Kloten	Recap
Altorfer (Spiller, Meyer) - 7:02; Marchon (Faille, Loosli) (PP1) - 12:09; Figren (Steiner, Faille) - 14:34		First period	17:10 - Ang
Ganz (Figren, Marchon) - 2:49; Nodari (Meyer, Altorfer) - 4:06; Figren (Faille) - 9:16		Second period	No scoring
No scoring		Third period	1:00 - Ang (Pelletier, Jolliet) (PP1)
Tim Wolf ( 21 saves / 23 shots )		Goalie stats	Luis Janett ( 9 saves / 13 shots ) Bryan Rüegger ( 15 saves / 17 shots )

3 April	Hockey Thurgau	2-3	EHC Kloten	Güttingersreuti, Weinfelden	Recap
0:16 - Faille (Figren, Marchon)		First period	Woger (Kühni, Hollenstein) - 4:25
No scoring		Second period	Kellenberger (Ganz, Altorfer) - 13:32 Stämpfli - 17:24
17:47 - Spannring (Pelletier, Ang)		Third period	No scoring
Luis Janett ( 22 saves / 25 shots )		Goalie stats	Sandro Zurkirchen ( 24 saves / 26 shots )

5 April	EHC Kloten	2-3	OT	Hockey Thurgau	Stimo Arena, Kloten	Recap
Figren (Marchon) - 14:41		First period		No scoring
No scoring		Second period		7:19 - Spannring (Hobi, Kühni)
Marchon (Faille, Ganz) - 6:13		Third period		5:27 - Ang (Derungs, Rundqvist)
No scoring		First overtime period		14:43 - Hobi (Ang, Rundqvist) (PP1)
Sandro Zurkirchen ( 37 saves / 40 shots )		Goalie stats		Luis Janett ( 39 saves / 41 shots )

7 April	Hockey Thurgau	2-3	EHC Kloten	Güttingersreuti, Weinfelden	Recap
9:55 - Derungs (Rundqvist, Ang) (PP1)		First period	Marchon (Loosli, Faille) (PP1) - 2:46 Nodari (Altorfer) - 12:13; Marchon (Figren, Faille) - 18:14
11:14 - Ang (Pelletier, Derungs) (PP1)		Second period	No scoring
No scoring		Third period	No scoring
Luis Janett ( 26 saves / 29 shots )		Goalie stats	Tim Wolf ( 27 saves / 29 shots )

EHC Kloten won the series 4–2

==== (2) EHC Olten vs. (3) HC La Chaux-de-Fonds ====
28 March	EHC Olten	3-1	HC La Chaux-de-Fonds	Kleinholz Stadion, Olten	Recap
Knelsen (Nunn, Antonietti) - 19:51		First period	No scoring
Horanský (Langenegger, Eigenmann) - 16:10		Second period	10:11 - Dubois (Eugster, Privet) (PP1)
Horanský (Antonietti) (EN) - 17:36		Third period	No scoring
Simon Rytz ( 16 saves / 17 shots )		Goalie stats	Viktor Östlund ( 22 saves / 24 shots )

30 March	HC La Chaux-de-Fonds	2-5	EHC Olten	Patinoire des Mélèzes, La Chaux-de-Fonds	Recap
1:53 - Schnegg (Jaquet, Voirol)		First period	Sterchi - 4:07
No scoring		Second period	Fuhrer (Sterchi, Lhoták) - 4:30; Horanský (Lüthi, Hüsler) - 13:06
17:56 - Eugster (Privet, Dubois)		Third period	Wyss (Joggi, Eigenmann) - 5:21; Sterchi (Leeger) - 19:20 (EN)
Viktor Östlund ( 23 saves / 27 shots )		Goalie stats	Simon Rytz ( 29 saves / 31 shots )

1 April	EHC Olten	4-1	HC La Chaux-de-Fonds	Kleinholz Stadion, Olten	Recap
No scoring		First period	No scoring
Joggi (Sterchi, Eigenmann) (PP1) - 4:44		Second period	14:24 - Achermann (T. Andersons) (SH1)
Eigenmann (Hasani, Langenegger) - 8:30 Hüsler (Wyss, Joggi) - 17:39; Weder (EN) - 19:06		Third period	No scoring
Simon Rytz ( 24 saves / 25 shots )		Goalie stats	Viktor Östlund ( 37 saves / 40 shots )

3 April	HC La Chaux-de-Fonds	5-4	EHC Olten	Patinoire des Mélèzes, La Chaux-de-Fonds	Recap
6:59 - Dubois (Šmons, Petrini); 17:20 - Achermann (Suleski, Šmons)		First period	No scoring
5:28 - Döpfner (Šmons, Trettenes); 12:56 - Petrini; 18:15 - T. Andersons (Trettenes, Carbis) (PP1)		Second period	Schmuckli (Nunn) - 8:26
No scoring		Third period	Nunn (Knelsen, Horanský) (PP1) - 5:20; Nunn (SH1) - 11:00; Fuhrer (Scheidegger, Eigenmann) - 18:13
Viktor Östlund ( 45 saves / 49 shots )		Goalie stats	Simon Rytz ( 26 saves / 31 shots )

5 April	EHC Olten	1-3	HC La Chaux-de-Fonds	Kleinholz Stadion, Olten	Recap
Horanský (Scheidegger, Knelsen) (PP1) - 9:38		First period	2:25 - Achermann (Šmons, T. Andersons) (PP1)
No scoring		Second period	5:30 - Muller (In-Albon, Petrini) 18:28 - Carbis (Döpfner)
No scoring		Third period	No scoring
Simon Rytz ( 14 saves / 17 shots )		Goalie stats	Viktor Östlund ( 35 saves / 36 shots )

7 April	HC La Chaux-de-Fonds	3-4	EHC Olten	Patinoire des Mélèzes, La Chaux-de-Fonds	Recap
14:12 - Trettenes (Šmons, T. Andersons) (PP1)		First period	Sterchi (Scheidegger, Rytz) - 14:39
2:59 - Carbis (Trettenes, Jaquet)		Second period	No scoring
13:40 - Petrini (In-Albon, Huntebrinker) (PP1)		Third period	Nunn (Eigenmann, Horanský) - 10:09 Schmuckli (Mosimann, Wyss) - 11:27; Nunn (Smith, Horanský) - 12:02
Viktor Östlund ( 42 saves / 46 shots )		Goalie stats	Simon Rytz ( 25 saves / 28 shots )

EHC Olten won the series 4–2

=== Finals ===
11 April 2022; 19:45 (CEST)	EHC Kloten	2–1 OT2 (1–1, 0–0, 0–0) (OT: 0–0, 1–0) score in the series: 1–0	EHC Olten	Stimo Arena, Kloten; Attendance: 6,527

Game reference

Tim Wolf
Goalies
Simon Rytz
Referees:
Cedric Borga
Phillip Ströbel
Linesmen:
Nathy Burgy
Michael Stalder

Spiller (Meyer, Marchon) - 09:39	1–0
	1–1	14:45 - Nunn (Scheidegger, Horansky) (PP1)
Meyer (Spiller, Altorfer) - 80:48	2–1

10 min
Penalties
12 min
50
Shots
33

13 April 2022; 19:45 (CEST)	EHC Olten	1–0 OT (0-0, 0-0, 0-0) (OT: 1–0) score in the series: 1–1	EHC Kloten	Kleinholz Stadion, Olten; Attendance: 5,384

Game reference
Simon Rytz	Goalies	Tim Wolf	Referees: Daniel Piechaczek; Alex Dipietro; Linesmen: Steve Wermeille; Sandro Gurtner
Lhotak (Nunn) (PP1) - 66:02 / 1–0			Referees: Daniel Piechaczek; Alex Dipietro; Linesmen: Steve Wermeille; Sandro Gurtner
9 min	Penalties	12 min	Referees: Daniel Piechaczek; Alex Dipietro; Linesmen: Steve Wermeille; Sandro Gurtner
25	Shots	32	Referees: Daniel Piechaczek; Alex Dipietro; Linesmen: Steve Wermeille; Sandro Gurtner

16 April 2022; 17:00 (CEST)	EHC Kloten	4–1 (1–1, 2–0, 1–0) score in the series: 2–1	EHC Olten	Stimo Arena, Kloten; Attendance: 7,600

Game reference

Tim Wolf
Goalies
Simon Rytz
Referees:
Daniel Piechaczek
Alex Dipietro
Linesmen:
Steve Wermeille
Sandro Gurtner

Figren (Marchon, Faille) (PP1) - 05:40	1–0
	1–1	09:03 - Forget (Nunn, Scheidegger) (PP2)
Figren (Randegger) (SH1) - 21:43	2–1
Spiller - 38:26	3–1
Faille (Figren) - 50:12	4–1

33 min
Penalties
18 min
41
Shots
21

18 April 2022; 17:00 (CEST)	EHC Olten	1–4 (0–3, 1–1, 0–0) score in the series: 1–3	EHC Kloten	Kleinholz Stadion, Olten; Attendance: 5,384

Game reference

Simon Rytz
Goalies
Tim Wolf
Referees:
Cedric Borga
Phillip Ströbel
Linesmen:
Nathy Burgy
Michael Stalder

	0–1	05:37 - Knellwolf (Figren) (PP1)
	0–2	17:33 - Figren (Randegger, Faille)
	0–3	18:28 - Marchon (Faille, Figren) (PP1)
	0–4	30:29 - Meyer (Marchon)
Elsener (Smith, Leeger) - 33:48	1–4

10 min
Penalties
10 min
39
Shots
22

20 April 2022; 19:00 (CEST)	EHC Kloten	1–0 (0–0, 1–0, 0–0) score in the series: 4–1	EHC Olten	Stimo Arena, Kloten; Attendance: 7,600

Game reference
Tim Wolf	Goalies	Simon Rytz	Referees: Daniel Stricker; Michael Tscherrig; Linesmen: Nathy Burgy; Michael Stalder
Altorfer (PP1) - 28:07 / 1–0			Referees: Daniel Stricker; Michael Tscherrig; Linesmen: Nathy Burgy; Michael Stalder
2 min	Penalties	12 min	Referees: Daniel Stricker; Michael Tscherrig; Linesmen: Nathy Burgy; Michael Stalder
42	Shots	25	Referees: Daniel Stricker; Michael Tscherrig; Linesmen: Nathy Burgy; Michael Stalder

EHC Kloten won the series 4–1.
