= 2012 Kajotbet Hockey Games =

Tournament details
- Host countries: Czechia; Russia
- Cities: Brno; Saint Petersburg
- Venues: 2 (in 2 host cities)
- Dates: 26–29 April 2012
- Teams: 4

Final positions
- Champions: Finland (5th title)
- Runners-up: Czech Republic
- Third place: Russia
- Fourth place: Sweden

Tournament statistics
- Games played: 6
- Goals scored: 29 (4.83 per game)
- Attendance: 38,082 (6,347 per game)
- Scoring leader(s): (Sweden) Niklas Olausson (Czech Republic) Jiří Novotný (4 points)

The 2012 Kajotbet Hockey Games was played between 26 and 29 April 2012. The Czech Republic, Finland, Sweden and Russia played a round-robin for a total of three games per team and six games in total. Five of the matches were played in Kajot Arena in Brno, Czech Republic, and one match in Yubileyny Sports Palace in Saint Petersburg, Russia. The tournament was part of 2011–12 Euro Hockey Tour.

Finland won the tournament for the fifth time, winning all three games. It was also their first Czech/Kajotbet Hockey Games win since 2003. From this year's tournament, it's called Kajotbet Hockey Games due to sponsoring by Kajotbet.

== Standings ==
Pos	Team	Pld	W	OTW	OTL	L	GF	GA	GD	Pts
1	Finland	3	2	1	0	0	9	3	+6	8
2	Czech Republic	3	2	0	1	0	9	7	+2	7
3	Russia	3	1	0	0	2	5	6	−1	3
4	Sweden	3	0	0	0	3	6	13	−7	0

Source: eurohockey

== Games ==
All times are local (UTC+2 for the games in the Czech Republic, and UTC+4 for the game in Russia).

26 April 2012; 18:30	Sweden	3–5 (1–1, 2–2, 0–2)	Czech Republic	Kajot Arena, Brno; Attendance: 7,068

Game reference

Jhonas Enroth Viktor Fasth
Goalies
Jakub Štěpánek
Referees:
(Russia) Alexei Anisimov
(Russia) Konstantin Olenin

05:39 – Calle Järnkrok (Mattias Karlsson) (PP)	1–0
	1–1	19:33 – Ondrej Nemec (Tomas Zizka, Jiri Novotny) (PP)
	1–2	23:05 – Jiri Novotny (Ales Hemsky) (PP)
	1–3	23:53 – Jiri Tlusty (Miroslav Blatak, Tomáš Plekanec) (PP)
33:18 – Staffan Kronwall (Niklas Olausson, Patrik Zackrisson)	2–3
33:40 – Johan Harju (Joel Lundqvist)	3–3
	3–4	40:08 – Tomáš Plekanec
	3–5	59:52 - Petr Prucha (EN)

18 min
Penalties
16 min
39
Shots
29

26 April 2012; 20:00	Russia	0–2 (0–0, 0–1, 0–1)	Finland	Yubileyny Sports Palace, Saint Petersburg; Attendance: 5,620

Game reference
Semen Varlamov	Goalies	Kari Lehtonen	Referees: (Sweden) Christer Lärking (Russia) Alexandr Sadovnikov
0–1 / 32:30 – Mikko Mäenpää (Harri Pesonen, Juuso Hietanen) (PP); 0–2 / 59:44 – Antti Pihlström (Matti Kuparinen, Kari Lehtonen)			Referees: (Sweden) Christer Lärking (Russia) Alexandr Sadovnikov
10 min	Penalties	12 min	Referees: (Sweden) Christer Lärking (Russia) Alexandr Sadovnikov
31	Shots	18	Referees: (Sweden) Christer Lärking (Russia) Alexandr Sadovnikov

28 April 2012; 14:00	Czech Republic	2–3 OT (2–0, 0–2, 0–0) (OT: 0–1)	Finland	Kajot Arena, Brno; Attendance: 6,905

Game reference

Jakub Štěpánek
Goalies
Petri Vehanen
Referees:
(Russia) Konstantin Olenin
(Russia) Alexei Anisimov

13:28 – Ondrej Nemec (Petr Nedvěd, Ales Hemsky) (PP)	1–0
16:51 – Lukas Kaspar (Jiří Novotný) (PP)	2–0
	2–1	26:43 – Lennart Petrell (Topi Jaakola, Tuomas Kiiskinen)
	2–2	31:03 – Mikko Mäenpää (Juuso Hietanen, Jussi Jokinen) (PP)
	2–3	62:27 – Tuomas Kiiskinen

39 min
Penalties
41 min
29
Shots
28

28 April 2012; 18:30	Russia	4–2 (0–0, 3–1, 1–1)	Sweden	Kajot Arena, Brno; Attendance: 5,655

Game reference

Semen Varlamov
Goalies
Viktor Fasth
Referees:
(Czech Republic) Vladimir Sindler
(Czech Republic) Martin Frano

34:44 – Evgeny Kuznetsov (Alexei Tereshchenko) (PP)	1–0
37:29 – Nikolai Kulyomin (Konstantin Korneyev, Ilya Nikulin)	2–0
38:19 – Nikolai Zherdev (Alexei Tereshchenko)	3–0
	3–1	38:55 – Niklas Olausson (Jonas Andersson, Staffan Kronwall)
	3–2	55:48 – Mattias Karlsson (Niklas Olausson, Jesper Fast) (PP)
58:25 – Nikolai Zherdev (Alexei Tereshchenko, Danis Zaripov)	4–2

18 min
Penalties
20 min
37
Shots
24

29 April 2012; 14:00	Finland	4–1 (1–0, 1–0, 2–1)	Sweden	Kajot Arena, Brno; Attendance: 5,634

Game reference

Kari Lehtonen
Goalies
Jhonas Enroth
Referees:
(Czech Republic) Vladimir Sindler
(Czech Republic) Jan Hribik

01:28 – Jussi Jokinen (Juuso Hietanen, Mikko Mäenpää) (PP)	1–0
28:27 – Ville Peltonen (Ossi Väänänen, Joonas Järvinen)	2–0
	2–1	44:42 – atrik Zackrisson (Niklas Olausson, Jonas Andersson)
49:06 – Tuomas Kiiskinen (Jussi Jokinen, [[]])	3–1
59:07 – Janne Pesonen (Mikael Granlund) (EN)	4–1

10 min
Penalties
4 min
33
Shots
23

29 April 2012; 18:00	Czech Republic	2–1 (0–0, 2–1, 0–0)	Russia	Kajot Arena, Brno; Attendance: 7,200

Game reference

Jakub Kovář
Goalies
Konstantin Barulin
Referees:
(Finland) Tom Laaksonen
(Finland) Jari Leppäalho

	0–1	23:11 – Yevgeny Ketov (Danis Zaripov)
37:37 – Jakub Petružálek (Jiří Novotný, Lukáš Kašpar)	1–1
38:54 – Petr Nedvěd (Tomáš Plekanec)	2–1

12 min
Penalties
16 min
27
Shots
23

== Scoring leaders ==
Pos	Player	Country	GP	G	A	Pts	+/−	PIM	POS
1	Jiří Novotný	Czech Republic	3	1	3	4	2	+1	CE
1	Niklas Olausson	Sweden	3	1	3	4	2	-1	F
3	Tuomas Kiiskinen	Finland	3	2	1	3	0	+3	RW
4	Mikko Mäenpää	Finland	3	2	1	3	0	+2	LD
5	Jussi Jokinen	Finland	3	1	2	3	0	+1	LW

GP = Games played; G = Goals; A = Assists; Pts = Points; +/− = Plus/minus; PIM = Penalties in minutes; POS = Position
Source: swehockey

== Goaltending leaders ==
Pos	Player	Country	TOI	GA	GAA	Sv%	SO
1	Kari Lehtonen	Finland	120:00	1	0.50	98.28	1
2	Semyon Varlamov	Russia	119:00	3	1.51	93.02	0
3	Jakub Štěpánek	Czech Republic	122:27	6	2.94	90.00	0
4	Jhonas Enroth	Sweden	118:27	7	3.55	84.09	0

TOI = Time on ice (minutes:seconds); SA = Shots against; GA = Goals against; GAA = Goals Against Average; Sv% = Save percentage; SO = Shutouts
Source: swehockey

== Tournament awards ==
The tournament directorate named the following players in the tournament 2012:

- Best goalkeeper: (Finland) Kari Lehtonen
- Best defenceman: (Russia) Dmitri Kalinin
- Best forward: (Czech Republic) Tomáš Plekanec
