= Colin Smith (ice hockey) =

Canadian ice hockey player (born 1993)

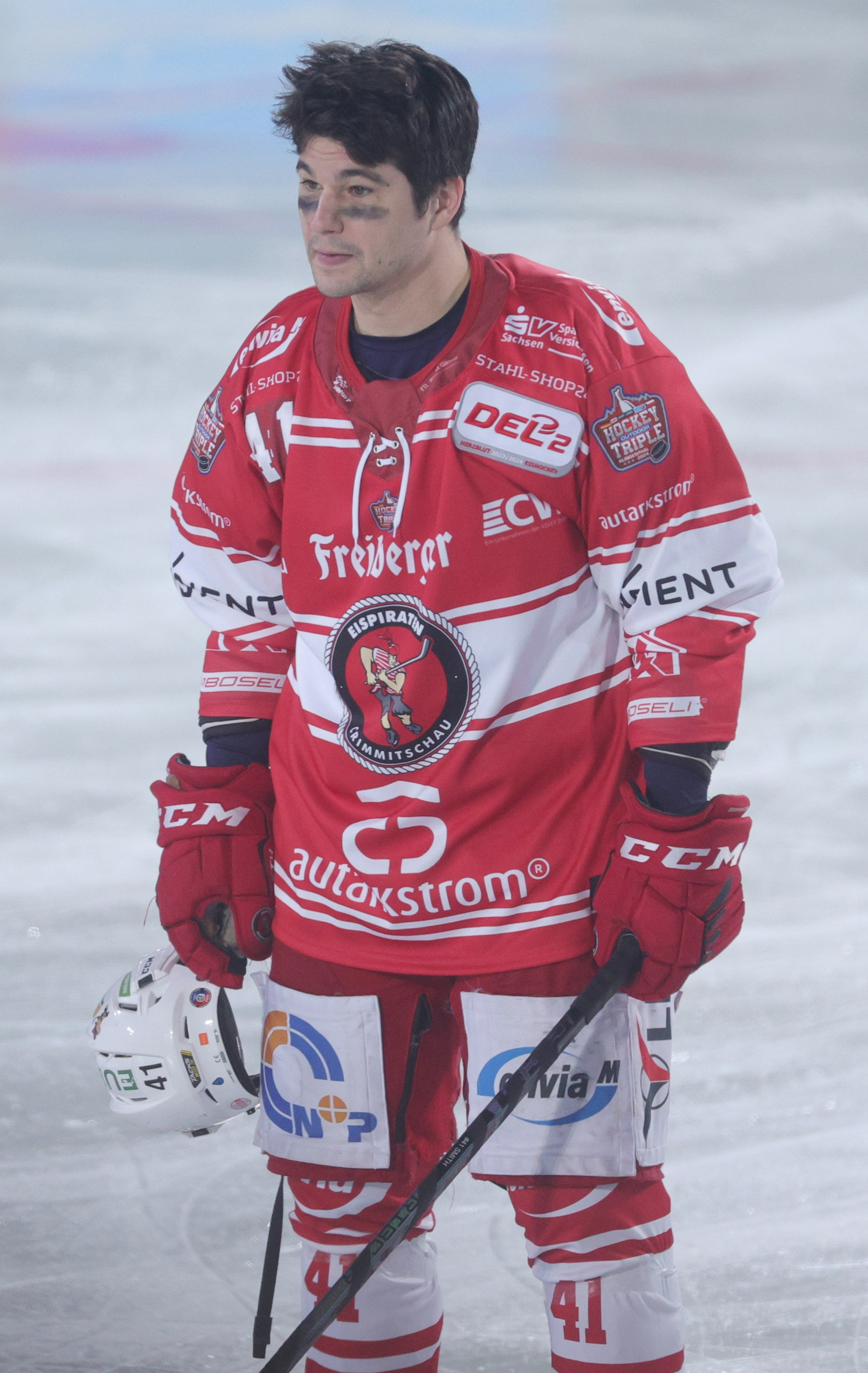
- Smith with the ETC Crimmitschau in 2024
- Born: June 20, 1993 (age 33) Edmonton, Alberta, Canada
- Height: 5 ft 10 in (178 cm)
- Weight: 172 lb (78 kg; 12 st 4 lb)
- Position: Centre
- Shoots: Right
- Ger.3 team Former teams: Hannover Scorpions; Colorado Avalanche; Eisbären Berlin; ERC Ingolstadt; Kölner Haie; Väsby IK; Södertälje SK; Black Wings Linz; EHC Olten
- NHL draft: 192nd overall, 2012; Colorado Avalanche
- Playing career: 2013–2022, 2023–present

Colin Smith (born June 20, 1993) is a Canadian professional ice hockey player currently under contract with the Hannover Scorpions of the Oberliga. Smith played in the National Hockey League (NHL) and was selected by the Colorado Avalanche in the 7th round (192nd overall) of the 2012 NHL entry draft.

== Playing career ==
As a youth, Smith played in the 2006 Quebec International Pee-Wee Hockey Tournament with the Edmonton Oilers minor ice hockey team.

=== Junior ===
Smith, played midget originally with CAC Edmonton Canadians of the Alberta Midget Hockey League. In the 2008–09 season Smith joined the Western Hockey League after he was drafted 7th overall in the WHL Bantam draft in 2008 by the Kamloops Blazers.

As a centre with average size, Smith developed a high hockey sense in his four-year outstanding career. He was awarded the Doc Seaman Memorial Trophy when he was only 17 years old, a coveted trophy given to the Western Hockey League's Scholastic Player of the Year. In 2011, he played in the Under-18 World Championship in Germany representing Canada. "The entire Kamloops Blazers organization is very proud of Colin Smith for earning this award," remarked Craig Bonner, vice-president and General Manager to Kamloops Blazers. Smith happens to be the third player to win this award for the Blazers.

Smith added another feather to his cap, when he was selected by the Colorado Avalanche, becoming the fifth Blazer drafted by the Avalanche, and the first since Ray Macias in 2005.

In his final year with the Blazers in the 2012–13 season, Smith was a contender throughout the season to be the WHL's leading scorer. Alongside linemate J.C. Lipon, Smith helped the Blazers set a franchise record in consecutive wins whilst earning consideration for the Canadian World Junior Squad. Smith finished fourth overall in league scoring with 106 points in 72 games and was rewarded for his outstanding performance with a selection to the 2013 WHL West First All-Star Team.

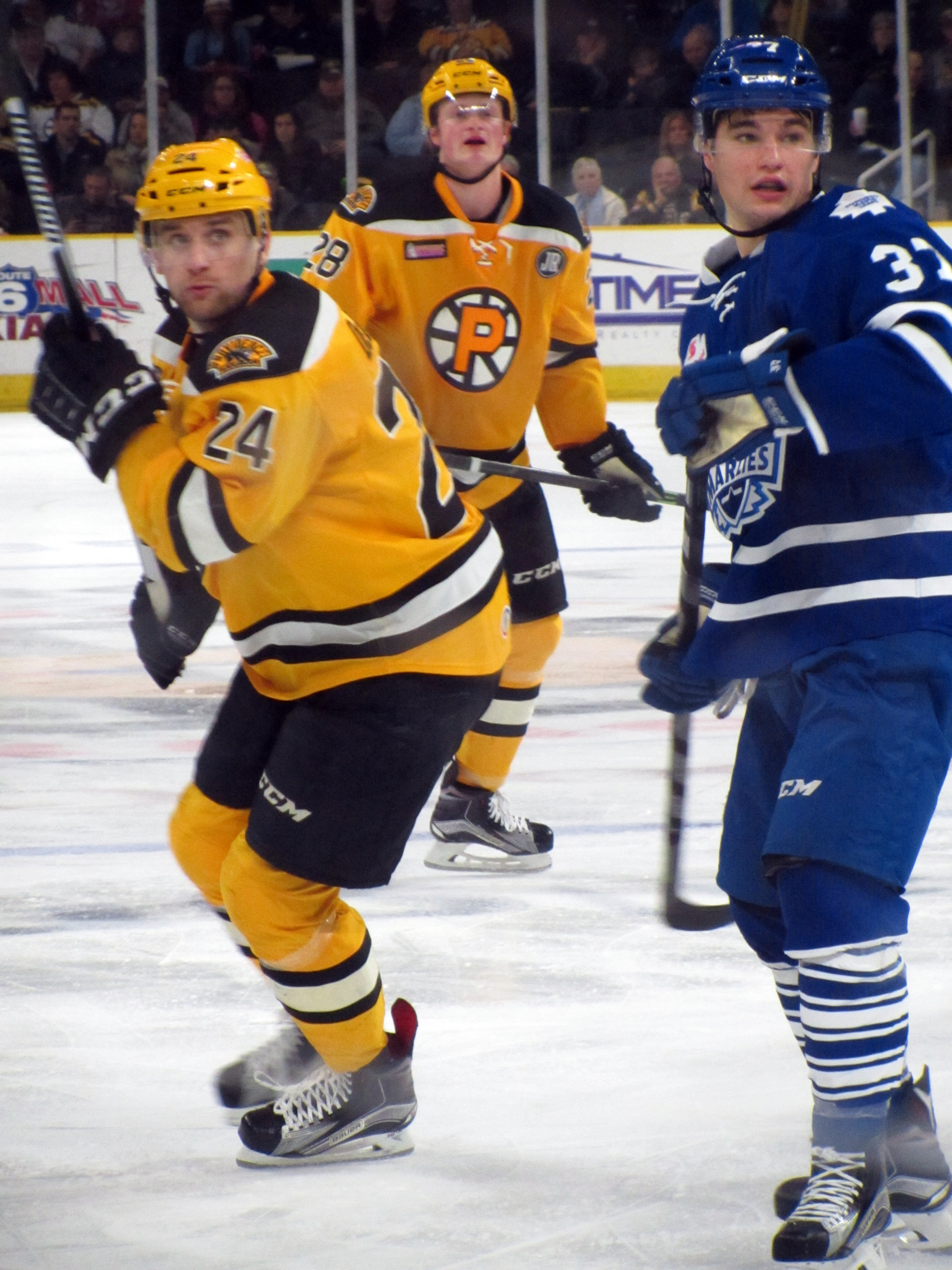
Smith during his tenure with the Marlies in 2016.

=== Professional ===
On July 5, 2013, it was officially announced that Smith had signed a three-year entry-level contract with the Colorado Avalanche. After attending the Avalanche's training camp and taking part in his first pre-season, Smith was assigned to AHL affiliate, the Lake Erie Monsters for the 2013–14 season. He made his professional debut against the Abbotsford Heat in the season opener before Smith enjoying a successful rookie campaign in finishing as the only Monster to play in each game, and led the team amongst rookies with 34 points in 76 games.

During his second season with the Monsters in 2014–15, Smith received his first NHL recall by the injury stricken Avalanche on November 30, 2014. On December 1, 2014, he made his NHL debut, as a centre on the fourth line, in a 4–3 defeat to the Montreal Canadiens before he was reassigned to the Monsters the following day for the remainder of the year.

In the last year of his entry-level contract, Smith was reassigned to begin the 2015–16 season with new AHL affiliate, the San Antonio Rampage. Smith emerged amongst the top scorers with the Rampage and placed third with 34 points in 54 contests before he was traded by the Avalanche, along with a fourth round pick in the 2016 draft, to the Toronto Maple Leafs in exchange for Shawn Matthias on February 21, 2016. Smith was immediately assigned to Toronto's AHL affiliate, the Toronto Marlies.

Despite not being tendered a qualifying offer in the off-season by the Maple Leafs, Smith opted to remain in the organization in agreeing to a one-year AHL contract with the Marlies on July 3, 2016. In the 2016–17 season, Smith was unable to retain his initial scoring rate from the last season with the Marlies. Collecting 28 points in 52 games, Smith was returned to the San Antonio Rampage in a trade in which the Marlies secured Mike Sislo on loan on March 1, 2017. In his second stint with the Rampage, Smith was entrenched on the top 2 scoring lines to finish with 19 points in 21 games.

As a free agent in the off-season, Smith continued his career in the AHL by securing a one-year contract with the Wilkes-Barre/Scranton Penguins on July 6, 2017. In the 2017–18 season, Smith suffered an early injury however returned to play in 35 games with the Penguins, recording 18 points. On February 14, 2018, Smith was traded by Wilkes-Barre/Scranton in exchange for Joseph Cramarossa to the Stockton Heat, affiliate to the Calgary Flames. In 24 games to end the regular season, Smith continued his offensive output in compiling 17 points.

At the conclusion of the season, Smith opted to leave North America as a free agent, agreeing to a one-year contract with German outfit, Eisbären Berlin of the DEL on June 28, 2018. Smith had difficulty adjusting in his first European season with Berlin in 2018–19, posting just 4 goals and 23 points in 52 games.

Smith opted to continue in the DEL with a point to prove, signing a one-year deal with ERC Ingolstadt on July 19, 2019. He opened the 2019–20 season, collecting 3 goals and 8 points in 17 games with Ingolstadt before leaving the club to join Kölner Haie for the remainder of the season on November 21, 2019.

After a lone season with Väsby IK of the Allsvenskan, Smith continued in the second tier Swedish league by agreeing to a one-year contract with Södertälje SK on May 29, 2021. Smith endured a whirlwind 2021–22 season, registering 10 points through 15 games in the Allsvenskan, before leaving to play in two short stints with Black Wings Linz in the ICE Hockey League and EHC Olten of the Swiss League.

Smith initially agreed to return to former club, Iserlohn Roosters of the DEL for the 2022–23 season, before opting to end his nine-year professional playing career and return to North America on August 24, 2022.

Smith was lured out of retirement after just one season, returning to Germany and signing with second tier club, Eispiraten Crimmitschau of the DEL2 on May 28, 2023.

== Career statistics ==
=== Regular season and playoffs ===
			Regular season					Playoffs
Season	Team	League	GP	G	A	Pts	PIM	GP	G	A	Pts	PIM
2008–09	CAC Edmonton Canadians	AMHL	34	23	32	55	10	—	—	—	—	—
2008–09	Kamloops Blazers	WHL	8	0	4	4	4	4	1	0	1	0
2009–10	Kamloops Blazers	WHL	48	5	21	26	46	4	2	2	4	2
2010–11	Kamloops Blazers	WHL	72	21	29	50	61	—	—	—	—	—
2011–12	Kamloops Blazers	WHL	72	35	50	85	51	11	3	7	10	12
2012–13	Kamloops Blazers	WHL	72	41	65	106	72	12	2	12	14	2
2013–14	Lake Erie Monsters	AHL	76	8	26	34	66	—	—	—	—	—
2014–15	Lake Erie Monsters	AHL	53	12	19	31	22	—	—	—	—	—
2014–15	Colorado Avalanche	NHL	1	0	0	0	0	—	—	—	—	—
2015–16	San Antonio Rampage	AHL	54	13	21	34	33	—	—	—	—	—
2015–16	Toronto Marlies	AHL	23	7	15	22	4	9	1	4	5	2
2016–17	Toronto Marlies	AHL	52	8	20	28	22	—	—	—	—	—
2016–17	San Antonio Rampage	AHL	21	6	13	19	10	—	—	—	—	—
2017–18	Wilkes-Barre/Scranton Penguins	AHL	35	5	13	18	12	—	—	—	—	—
2017–18	Stockton Heat	AHL	24	4	13	17	16	—	—	—	—	—
2018–19	Eisbären Berlin	DEL	52	4	19	23	40	8	0	1	1	8
2019–20	ERC Ingolstadt	DEL	17	3	5	8	6	—	—	—	—	—
2019–20	Kölner Haie	DEL	33	1	6	7	20	—	—	—	—	—
2020–21	Väsby IK	Allsv	28	8	27	35	65	—	—	—	—	—
2021–22	Södertälje SK	Allsv	15	5	5	10	11	—	—	—	—	—
2021–22	Black Wings Linz	ICEHL	16	5	9	14	10	—	—	—	—	—
2021–22	EHC Olten	SL	8	2	5	7	8	3	0	2	2	0
2023–24	Eispiraten Crimmitschau	DEL2	34	8	36	44	30	13	3	14	17	12
2024–25	Eispiraten Crimmitschau	DEL2	30	10	33	43	63	—	—	—	—	—
2025–26	Düsseldorfer EG	DEL2	4	0	4	4	2	—	—	—	—	—
2025–26	Kassel Huskies	DEL2	2	0	1	1	0	—	—	—	—	—
2025–26	HC Vita Hästen	Div.1	20	4	18	22	35	3	1	2	3	0
NHL totals			1	0	0	0	0	—	—	—	—	—

=== International ===
Year	Team	Event	Result	GP	G	A	Pts	PIM
2010	Canada Pacific	U17	5th	5	1	3	4	4
2011	Canada	U18	4th	7	2	1	3	14
Junior totals				12	3	4	7	18

== Awards and honours ==
Award	Year
WHL
Daryl K. (Doc) Seaman Trophy	2011
First All-Star Team	2013
