= Robin Figren =

Swedish ice hockey player

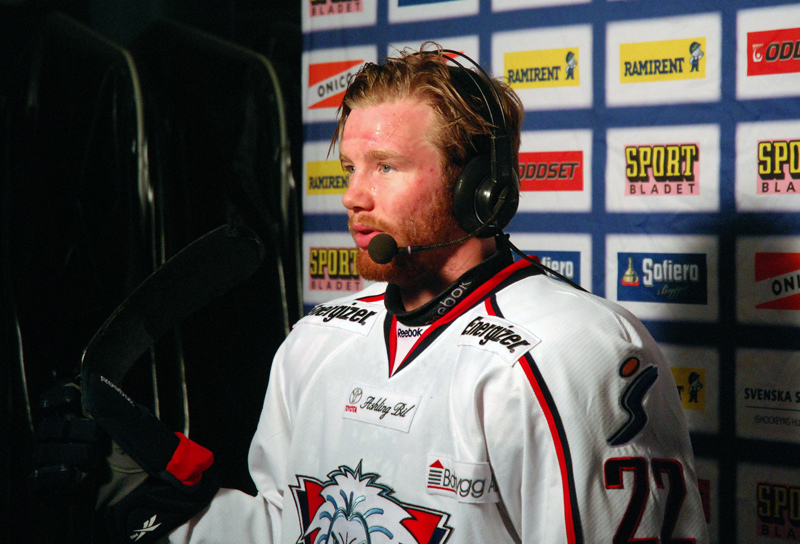
- Born: March 7, 1988 (age 38) Stockholm, Sweden
- Height: 5 ft 11 in (180 cm)
- Weight: 176 lb (80 kg; 12 st 8 lb)
- Position: Right wing
- Shot: Right
- Played for: Djurgårdens IF; Bridgeport Sound Tigers; Linköpings HC; Frölunda HC; HV71
- NHL draft: 70th overall, 2006; New York Islanders
- Playing career: 2008–2022

Robin Figren (born March 7, 1988) is a Swedish former professional ice hockey player. Figren was selected 70th overall in the third round of the 2006 NHL entry draft by the New York Islanders.

== Playing career ==
Figren played junior hockey with the Swedish team Frölunda HC. After impressive performances in the J20 SuperElit, Robin played 2 games as a 17-year-old in the Elitserien. After the draft, Figren played in the Western Hockey League for the Calgary Hitmen and Edmonton Oil Kings.

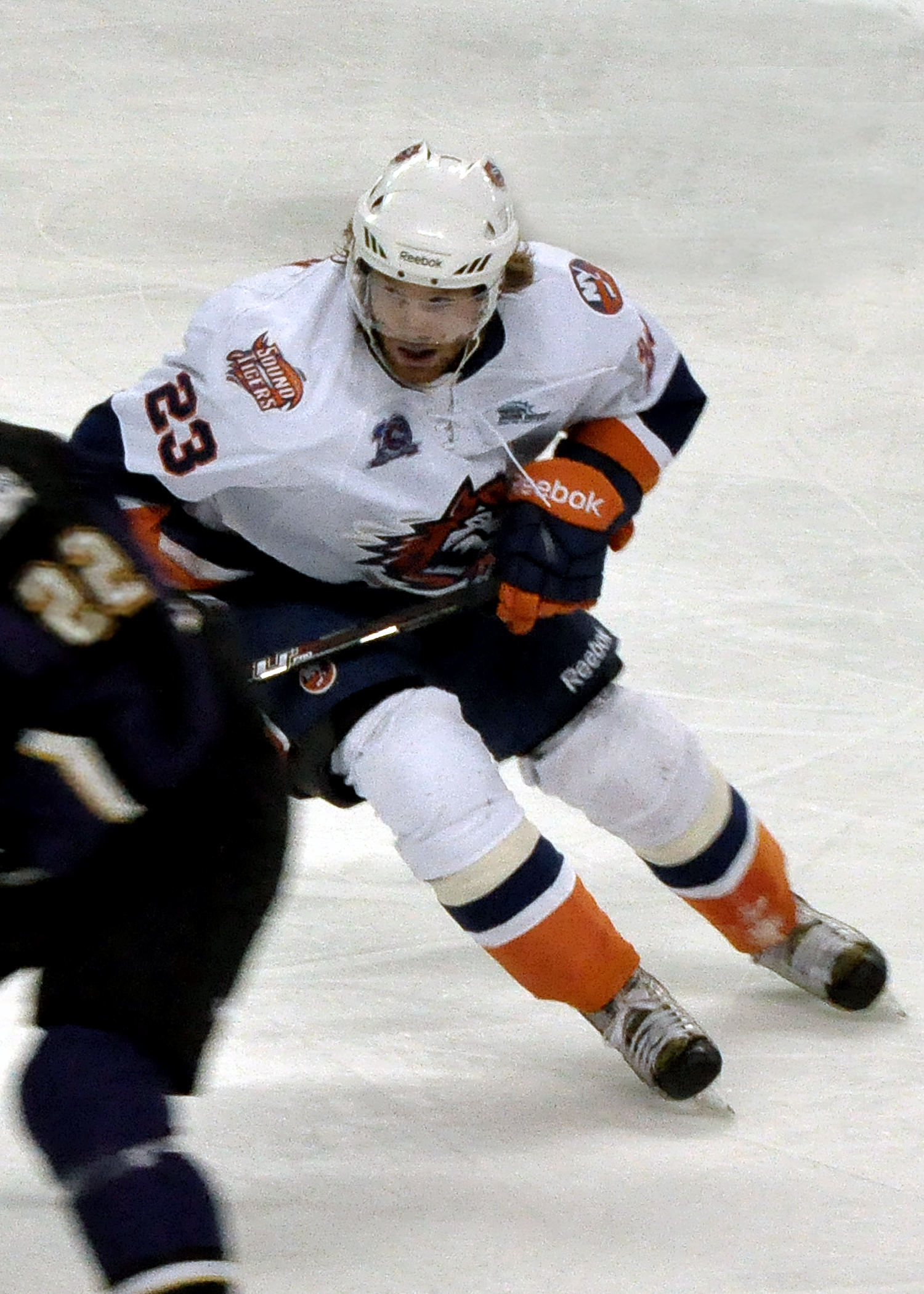
Figren with the Sound Tigers.

In the 2008–09 season, Figren played his first professional season, returning to the Elitserien with Djurgårdens IF. Upon the completion of the Djurgården season, he was assigned to the Islanders' AHL affiliate, the Bridgeport Sound Tigers, to finish the year.

On April 20, 2011, Figren left the Islanders organization and returned to Sweden, signing a one-year with Linköpings HC of the Elitserien. After four seasons with Frölunda HC, including capturing the Le Mat trophy in the 2015–16 season, Figren left the club as a free agent following the 2016–17 season, agreeing to a two-year contract with current champions, HV71, on May 10, 2017.

On June 24, 2019, Figren joined EHC Kloten of the Swiss League (SL) on a one-year deal. Figren remained with Kloten for three seasons, establishing himself as an offensive leader on the club and helping the team gain promotion and return to the National League in the 2021–22 season before announcing his retirement from professional hockey on 18 August 2022.

Figren was well known for his "zorro" goal for Sweden in the 2008 WJC tournament.

== Career statistics ==
=== Regular season and playoffs ===
			Regular season					Playoffs
Season	Team	League	GP	G	A	Pts	PIM	GP	G	A	Pts	PIM
2003–04	Hammarby IF	J18 Allsv	11	5	5	10	22	—	—	—	—	—
2004–05	Frölunda HC	J18 Allsv	12	13	8	21	94	7	4	4	8	10
2004–05	Frölunda HC	J20	4	1	2	3	0	—	—	—	—	—
2005–06	Frölunda HC	J18 Allsv	1	1	0	1	2	2	2	0	2	0
2005–06	Frölunda HC	J20	38	10	18	28	72	7	4	2	6	6
2005–06	Frölunda HC	SEL	2	0	0	0	0	—	—	—	—	—
2006–07	Calgary Hitmen	WHL	62	10	17	27	54	18	4	4	8	18
2007–08	Edmonton Oil Kings	WHL	35	18	13	31	46	—	—	—	—	—
2008–09	Frölunda HC	J20	1	1	2	3	2	—	—	—	—	—
2008–09	Djurgårdens IF	SEL	49	3	6	9	28	—	—	—	—	—
2008–09	Bridgeport Sound Tigers	AHL	3	0	1	1	2	—	—	—	—	—
2009–10	Bridgeport Sound Tigers	AHL	62	3	4	7	24	4	1	1	2	6
2010–11	Bridgeport Sound Tigers	AHL	76	14	16	30	39	—	—	—	—	—
2011–12	Linköpings HC	SEL	51	9	10	19	57	—	—	—	—	—
2012–13	Linköpings HC	SEL	55	9	4	13	28	10	4	3	7	10
2013–14	Frölunda HC	SHL	43	9	14	23	54	7	0	1	1	6
2014–15	Frölunda HC	SHL	49	16	15	31	26	9	0	1	1	4
2015–16	Frölunda HC	SHL	52	9	13	22	24	16	1	1	2	4
2016–17	Frölunda HC	SHL	48	11	10	21	33	14	0	1	1	4
2017–18	HV71	SHL	49	5	15	20	14	2	0	0	0	0
2018–19	HV71	SHL	50	15	15	30	26	9	1	0	1	6
2019–20	EHC Kloten	SUI.2	36	19	29	48	20	5	2	4	6	2
2020–21	EHC Kloten	SUI.2	46	29	31	60	30	17	8	9	17	12
2021–22	EHC Kloten	SUI.2	47	26	34	60	18	15	7	14	21	2
SHL totals			448	86	102	188	290	67	6	7	13	34
AHL totals			141	17	21	38	65	4	1	1	2	6

=== International ===
Year	Team	Event	Result	GP	G	A	Pts	PIM
2005	Sweden	U18	7th	5	3	0	3	6
2006	Sweden	WJC18	6th	6	3	2	5	16
2008	Sweden	WJC	2nd place, silver medalist(s)	6	5	2	7	2
Junior totals				17	11	4	15	24

== Awards and honors ==
Award	Year
SHL
Le Mat trophy (Frölunda HC)	2016
