= Mike Huntebrinker =

American ice hockey winger

- Born: July 2, 1992 (age 33) Chesterfield, Missouri, U.S.
- Height: 5 ft 11 in (180 cm)
- Weight: 194 lb (88 kg; 13 st 12 lb)
- Position: Centre
- Shot: Left
- Played for: Reading Royals; Lehigh Valley Phantoms; Florida Everblades; HC TWK Innsbruck; HC La Chaux-de-Fonds; HKM Zvolen
- Playing career: 2015–2023

Michael Huntebrinker (born July 2, 1992) is an American retired professional ice hockey centre. He last played for the Slovak Extraliga outfit HKM Zvolen in the 2022–23 session.

== Biography ==
Huntebrinker was born in Chesterfield, Missouri on July 2, 1992. He started his hockey career with ECHL team Reading Royals in 2016. In 2019 he transferred to Florida Everblades. In 2021–22 he joined the Austrian team HC TWK Innsbruck. In 2022–23 he joined HKM Zvolen, where he became the most productive player. Following the session, he decided to end his active career.

== Career statistics ==
=== Regular season and playoffs ===
			Regular season					Playoffs
Season	Team	League	GP	G	A	Pts	PIM	GP	G	A	Pts	PIM
2016–17	Reading Royals	ECHL	8	0	3	3	5	2	0	0	0	0
2017–18	Reading Royals	ECHL	65	20	21	41	23	4	0	0	0	0
2018–19	Lehigh Valley Phantoms	AHL	22	2	0	2	8	—	—	—	—	—
2018–19	Reading Royals	ECHL	36	18	26	44	15	—	—	—	—	—
2019–20	Florida Everblades	ECHL	43	20	24	44	8	—	—	—	—	—
2020–21	Florida Everblades	ECHL	63	24	22	46	23	5	1	2	3	4
2021–22	HC TWK Innsbruck	ICEHL	45	13	34	47	8	17	3	4	7	4
2021–22	HC La Chaux-de-Fonds	Swiss League	3	0	4	4	0	10	5	3	8	0
2022–23	HKM Zvolen	Slovak	50	13	37	50	43	17	3	4	7	4
ECHL totals			215	82	96	178	63	11	1	2	3	2
Slovak totals			50	13	37	50	43	17	3	4	7	4
