= Mikko Mäenpää =

Finnish ice hockey player

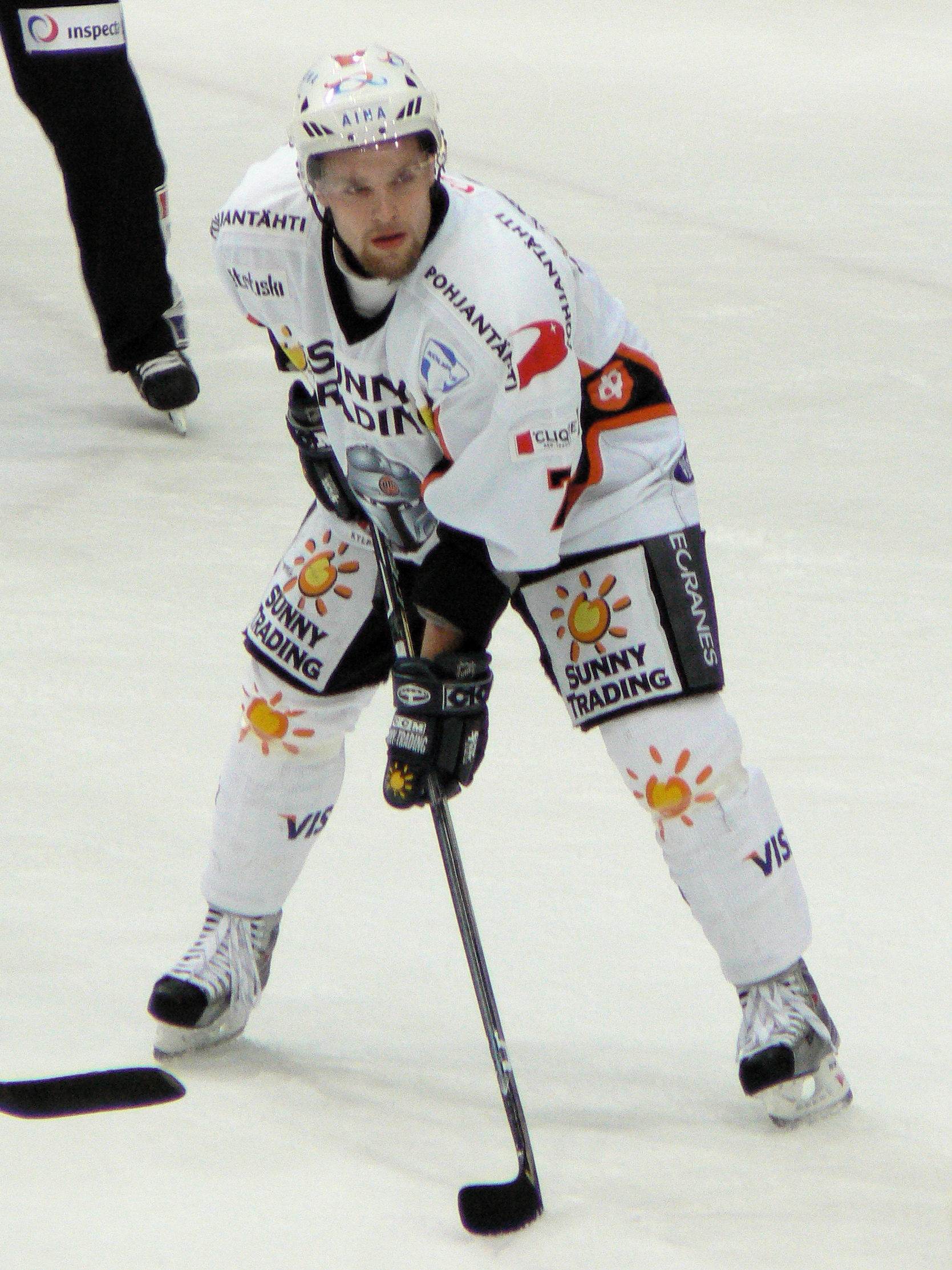
- Born: April 19, 1983 (age 43) Tampere, Finland
- Height: 5 ft 10 in (178 cm)
- Weight: 183 lb (83 kg; 13 st 1 lb)
- Position: Defence
- Shoots: Left
- Liiga team Former teams: JYP Jyväskylä; Pelicans; HPK; Syracuse Crunch; Skellefteå AIK; Frölunda HC; Amur Khabarovsk; CSKA Moscow; HC Lev Praha; HC Ambrì-Piotta
- National team: Finland
- NHL draft: Undrafted
- Playing career: 2002–present

Mikko Mäenpää (born April 19, 1983) is a Finnish professional ice hockey defenceman, currently playing for JYP Jyväskylä in the Liiga.

== Playing career ==
He could not break through into Tappara roster at young age, so he moved to JYP in 2002. He also made brief visits to Pelicans and Mestis teams Jukurit and Sport. After a full season in Jukurit in 2005-06 when the team won Mestis title, he moved to HPK and made a breakthrough season in SM-liiga, having 40 points. After the 2006–2007 season, Mäenpää was chosen to the SM-liiga All-Star Team.

He signed a contract with Columbus Blue Jackets of the National Hockey League (NHL) in the summer, but ended up playing for their American Hockey League (AHL) affiliate the Syracuse Crunch. He returned to HPK mid-season, only to continue to Skellefteå AIK in the Swedish Elitserien later in the season. He played two more seasons in HPK until 2010 and had seasons of 47 and 30 points. He was then selected to the national team for the 2010 IIHF World Championship for the first time in his career.

He then returned to Elitserien and signed for Frölunda HC for the 2010–11 season before signing for Amur Khabarovsk of the Kontinental Hockey League in Russia for 2011–12. In 2012–13 he played 25 matches for HC CSKA Moscow and moved to Lev Prague after that. On July 2, 2015, he signed a one-year deal to continue his professional career with HC Ambrì-Piotta, a Swiss team competing in the National League A.

== Career statistics ==
=== Regular season and playoffs ===
			Regular season					Playoffs
Season	Team	League	GP	G	A	Pts	PIM	GP	G	A	Pts	PIM
2000–01	Tappara	Jr. A	35	10	8	18	30	5	1	0	1	4
2001–02	Tappara	Jr. A	39	13	12	25	201	—	—	—	—	—
2002–03	JYP	Jr. A	4	1	3	4	0	—	—	—	—	—
2002–03	JYP	SM-l	9	0	0	0	4	—	—	—	—	—
2003–04	Sport	Mestis	2	1	0	1	0	—	—	—	—	—
2003–04	JYP	SM-l	40	0	2	2	44	2	0	0	0	2
2004–05	Jukurit	Mestis	4	0	2	2	4	—	—	—	—	—
2004–05	JYP	SM-l	9	0	1	1	0	—	—	—	—	—
2004–05	Pelicans	SM-l	32	0	2	2	0	—	—	—	—	—
2005–06	Jukurit	Mestis	40	6	10	16	75	6	2	1	3	2
2006–07	HPK	SM-l	52	14	26	40	48	9	3	2	5	10
2007–08	Syracuse Crunch	AHL	7	0	2	2	6	—	—	—	—	—
2007–08	HPK	SM-l	13	3	2	5	18	—	—	—	—	—
2007–08	Skellefteå AIK	SEL	11	3	4	7	12	5	0	1	1	25
2008–09	HPK	SM-l	58	11	36	47	40	6	1	1	2	6
2009–10	HPK	SM-l	43	12	18	30	72	17	5	4	9	26
2010–11	Frölunda HC	SEL	46	8	10	18	46	—	—	—	—	—
2011–12	Amur Khabarovsk	KHL	51	14	23	37	58	4	0	3	3	4
2012–13	CSKA Moscow	KHL	29	2	2	4	8	—	—	—	—	—
2012–13	HC Lev Praha	KHL	3	1	1	2	0	4	1	1	2	2
2013–14	HC Lev Praha	KHL	31	0	12	12	10	22	2	9	11	6
2014–15	JYP	Liiga	19	3	12	15	26	12	2	6	8	6
2015–16	HC Ambrì-Piotta	NLA	46	6	31	37	16	—	—	—	—	—
2016–17	HC Ambrì-Piotta	NLA	34	4	20	24	24	—	—	—	—	—
2017–18	JYP	Liiga	45	4	23	27	32	6	2	1	3	4
2018–19	JYP	Liiga	23	5	3	8	16	3	0	1	1	0
Liiga totals			348	52	125	177	316	55	13	15	28	54

=== International ===
Year	Team	Event	Result	GP	G	A	Pts	PIM
2000	Finland	U17	9th	3	0	0	0	2
2001	Finland	WJC18	3rd place, bronze medalist(s)	6	0	1	1	4
2010	Finland	WC	6th	7	0	1	1	2
2012	Finland	WC	4th	10	1	4	5	6
Junior totals				9	0	1	1	6
Senior totals				17	1	5	6	8
