= Sandro Zurkirchen =

Swiss ice hockey player (born 1990)

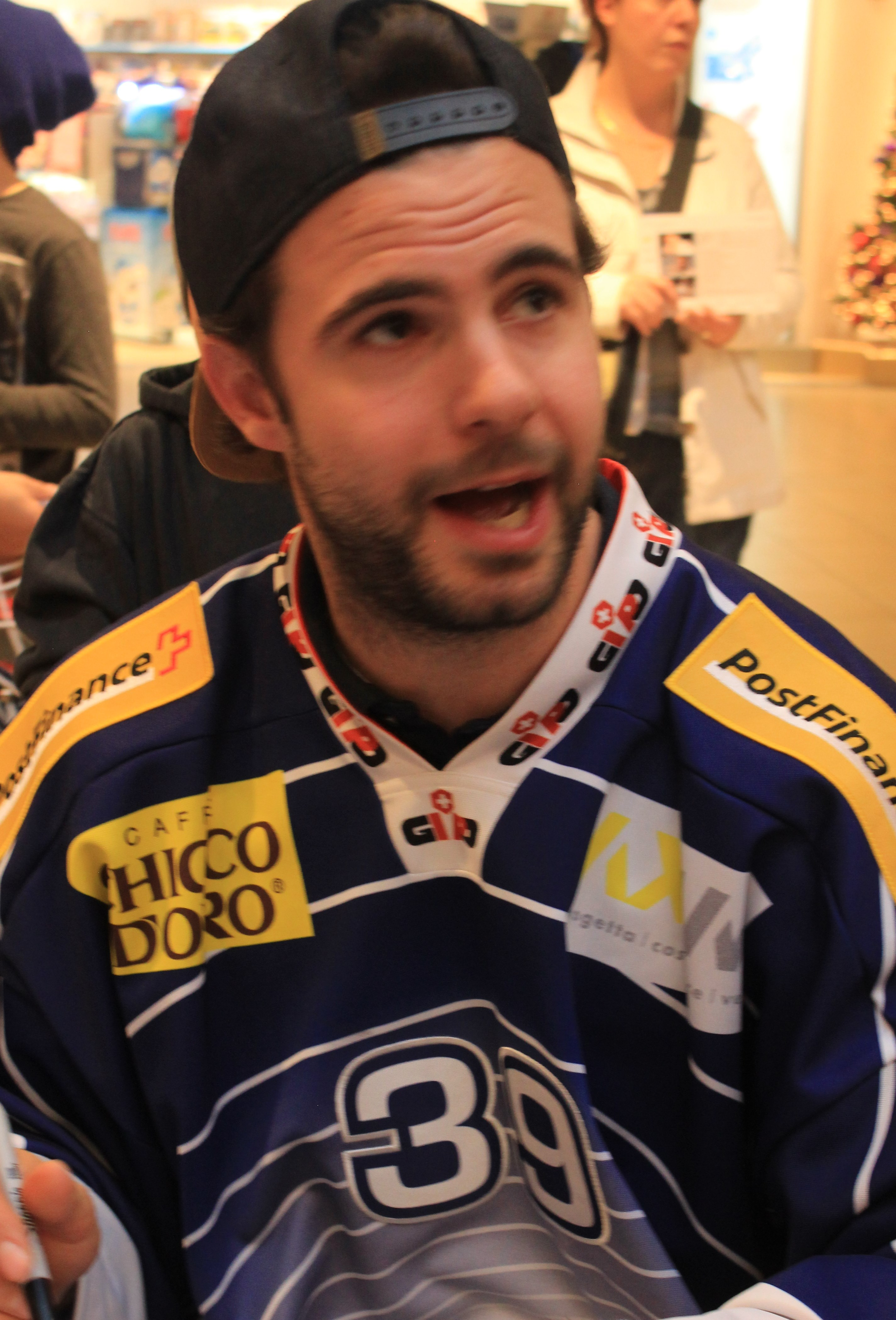
- Born: 25 February 1990 (age 35) Schwyz, Switzerland
- Height: 5 ft 11 in (180 cm)
- Weight: 172 lb (78 kg; 12 st 4 lb)
- Position: Goaltender
- Catches: Left
- NL team Former teams: EHC Kloten; EV Zug; HC Ambrì-Piotta; Lausanne HC; HC Lugano; Genève-Servette HC
- National team: Switzerland
- Playing career: 2009–present

Sandro Zurkirchen (born 25 February 1990) is a Swiss professional ice hockey goaltender who is currently playing for EHC Kloten of the National League (NL).
