= Noah Meier =

Swiss ice hockey player

- Born: September 24, 2002 (age 22); Zürich, Switzerland
- Height: 5 ft 11 in (180 cm)
- Weight: 170 lb (77 kg; 12 st 2 lb)
- Position: Defence
- Shoots: Left
- NL team Former teams: SCL Tigers; ZSC Lions
- Playing career: 2019–present

Noah Meier (born September 24, 2002) is a Swiss professional ice hockey defenceman for the SCL Tigers of the National League (NL).

== Playing career ==
Meier made his professional debut during the 2019–20 season with the GCK Lions of the Swiss League (SL). He also made his National League (NL) debut that same season with the ZSC Lions, appearing in three games. On April 3, 2020, Meier signed his first professional contract, agreeing to a three-year deal with the ZSC Lions.

Meier was assigned to the GCK Lions for the start of the 2020–21 season.

== International play ==
Meier was named to Switzerland's U20 national team for the 2021 World Junior Championships in Edmonton, Canada. He scored one goal and picked up one assist in four games as Switzerland failed to reach the quarterfinals for the first time in five years.

== Career statistics ==
=== International ===
Year	Team	Event	Result	GP	G	A	Pts	PIM
2021	Switzerland	WJC	9th	4	1	1	2	0
Junior totals				4	1	1	2	0
