= Niklas Olausson =

Swedish ice hockey player

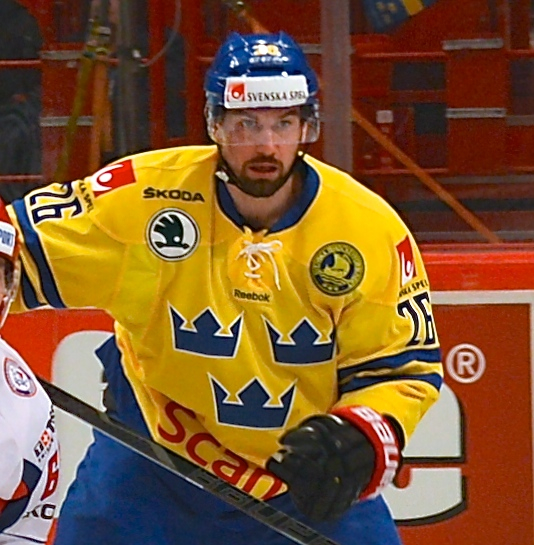
- Born: May 12, 1986 (age 39) Väckelsång, Sweden
- Height: 6 ft 0 in (183 cm)
- Weight: 194 lb (88 kg; 13 st 12 lb)
- Position: Center
- Shot: Left
- Played for: Linköping HC; EHC Biel; Oulun Kärpät; Graz99ers; Luleå HF
- Playing career: 2002–2024

Niklas Olausson (born May 12, 1986) is a Swedish former professional ice hockey forward. He last played with Luleå HF in the Swedish Hockey League (SHL).

Olausson played three seasons abroad in the Swiss National League and Finnish Liiga, before returning to the SHL for a second stint with Luleå HF on 24 March 2017.

== Career statistics ==
			Regular season					Playoffs
Season	Team	League	GP	G	A	Pts	PIM	GP	G	A	Pts	PIM
2000–01	Tingsryds AIF U16	U16 SM	3	4	0	4	2	—	—	—	—	—
2001–02	Tingsryds AIF U16		—	—	—	—	—	—	—	—	—	—
2001–02	Tingsryds AIF J18	J18 Elit	18	11	16	27	14	—	—	—	—	—
2001–02	Tingsryds AIF J20	J20 Elit	—	—	—	—	—	—	—	—	—	—
2002–03	Tingsryds AIF J20	J20 Elit	18	19	26	45	14	—	—	—	—	—
2002–03	Tingsryds AIF	Division 1	40	5	5	10	—	—	—	—	—	—
2003–04	Tingsryds AIF	Division 1	32	11	23	34	12	—	—	—	—	—
2004–05	Tingsryds AIF J18	J18 Elit	1	2	1	3	0	—	—	—	—	—
2004–05	Tingsryds AIF J20	J20 Elit	4	5	5	10	22	—	—	—	—	—
2004–05	Tingsryds AIF	Division 1	35	21	26	47	22	—	—	—	—	—
2005–06	IK Nyköping Hockey 90 J20	J20 Elit	3	5	6	11	—	—	—	—	—	—
2005–06	IK Nyköping Hockey 90	HockeyAllsvenskan	40	7	21	28	50	—	—	—	—	—
2006–07	Linköping HC	Elitserien	38	3	6	9	12	14	0	0	0	0
2006–07	Nyköpings HK	HockeyAllsvenskan	15	6	12	18	37	—	—	—	—	—
2007–08	Linköping HC	Elitserien	12	1	1	2	0	—	—	—	—	—
2007–08	Nyköpings HK	HockeyAllsvenskan	33	14	21	35	40	—	—	—	—	—
2008–09	VIK Västerås HK	HockeyAllsvenskan	44	15	56	71	44	9	3	5	8	32
2009–10	Luleå HF	Elitserien	46	11	19	30	18	—	—	—	—	—
2010–11	Luleå HF	Elitserien	43	10	16	26	12	10	0	6	6	4
2011–12	Luleå HF	Elitserien	53	8	33	41	18	5	1	3	4	0
2012–13	Luleå HF	Elitserien	48	11	25	36	14	15	1	10	11	4
2013–14	Luleå HF	SHL	49	11	22	33	60	6	1	3	4	4
2014–15	EHC Biel-Bienne	NLA	37	8	23	31	12	7	0	5	5	4
2015–16	EHC Biel-Bienne	NLA	29	4	16	20	22	—	—	—	—	—
2016–17	Oulun Kärpät	Liiga	26	3	15	18	18	—	—	—	—	—
2017–18	Luleå HF	SHL	45	7	26	33	16	2	0	1	1	0
2018–19	Luleå HF	SHL	43	16	18	34	24	8	3	5	8	6
2019–20	Luleå HF	SHL	36	8	12	20	16	—	—	—	—	—
2020–21	Luleå HF	SHL	48	10	18	28	12	7	1	2	3	0
2021–22	EHC Visp	SL	39	10	34	44	20	6	2	3	5	2
2022–23	EHC Basel	SL	4	2	2	4	0	—	—	—	—	—
2022–23	Graz 99ers	ICEHL	20	5	18	23	8	—	—	—	—	—
2022–23	Luleå HF	SHL	6	1	3	4	0	10	1	2	3	4
2023–24	Luleå HF	SHL	15	1	0	1	0	4	0	0	0	2
SHL (Elitserien) totals			482	98	199	297	202	81	8	32	40	24
Liiga totals			26	3	15	18	18	—	—	—	—	—
NLA totals			66	12	39	51	34	7	0	5	5	4
HockeyAllsvenskan totals			132	42	110	152	171	9	3	5	8	32
