= Larri Leeger =

Swiss-Finnish ice hockey player

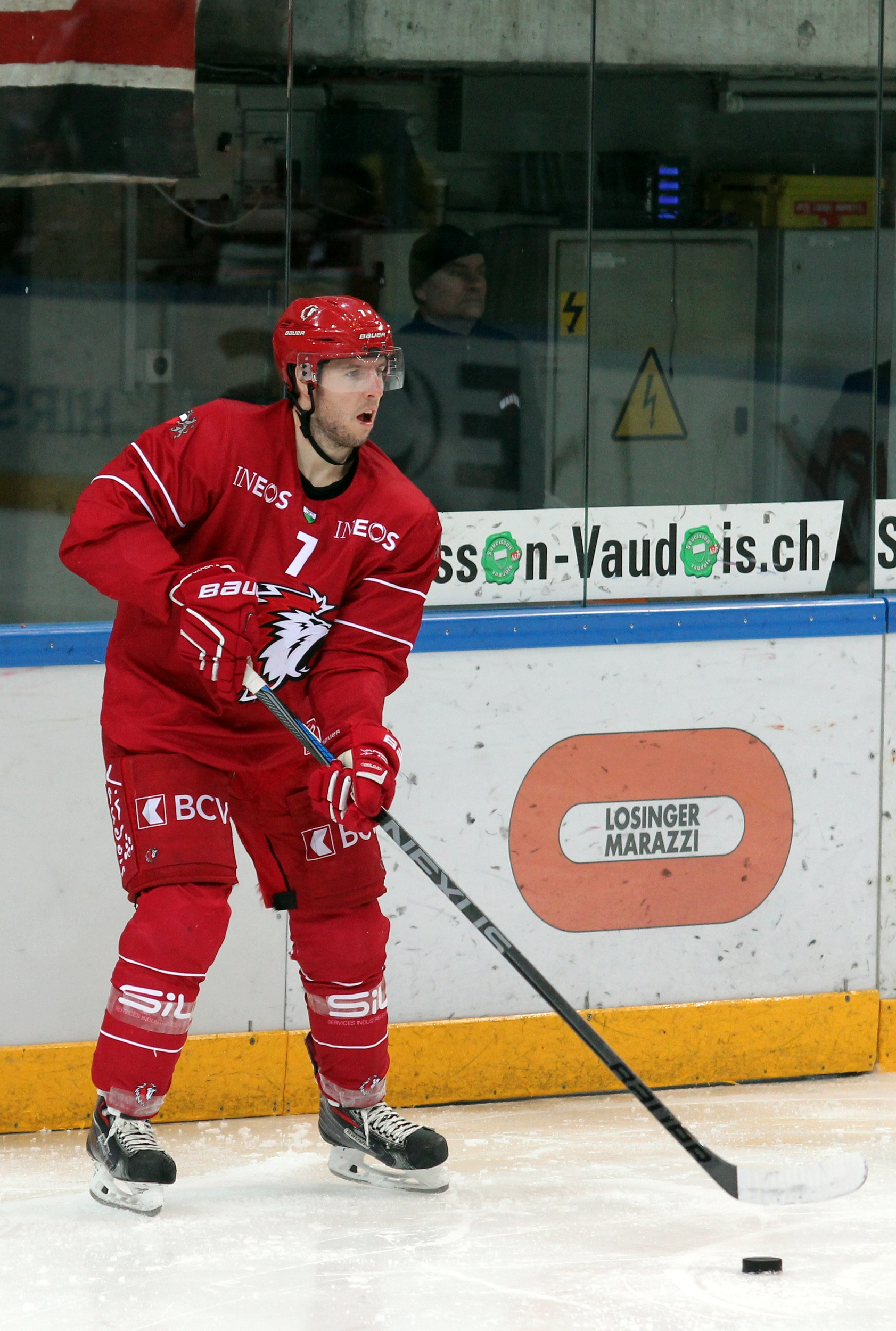
- Born: October 30, 1986 (age 38); Bülach, Switzerland
- Height: 6 ft 0 in (183 cm)
- Weight: 209 lb (95 kg; 14 st 13 lb)
- Position: Defence
- Shoots: Left
- NL team (P) Cur. team Former teams: SCL Tigers; EHC Olten (SL); ZSC Lions; Lausanne HC; Genève-Servette HC; HC Fribourg-Gottéron; EV Zug
- Playing career: 2005–present

Larri Leeger (born October 30, 1986) is a Swiss-Finnish professional ice hockey defenceman. He is currently playing with EHC Olten in the Swiss League (SL) on loan from the SCL Tigers of the National League (NL).

Leeger made his National League A debut playing with ZSC Lions during the 2006–07 NLA season.

== Early life ==
Leeger was born in Switzerland to a Finnish mother and a Swiss father. He holds dual citizenship of Finland and Switzerland.
