= Daniel Woger =

Austrian ice hockey player

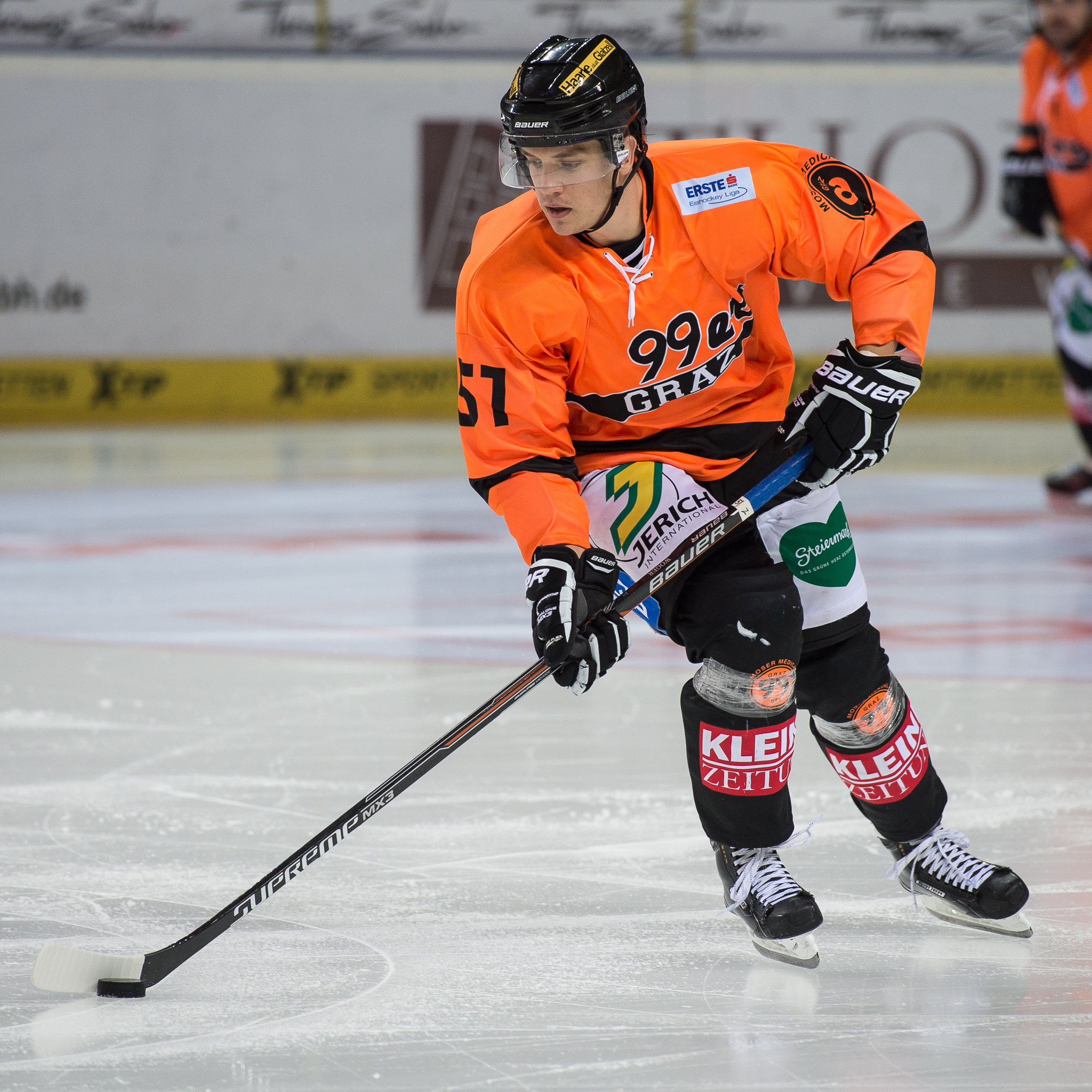
- Born: February 25, 1988 (age 38) Bregenz, Austria
- Height: 6 ft 1 in (185 cm)
- Weight: 181 lb (82 kg; 12 st 13 lb)
- Position: Forward
- Shot: Right
- Played for: HC TWK Innsbruck; Moser Medical Graz 99ers UPC Vienna Capitals; EHC LIWEST Black Wings Linz; Dornbirn Bulldogs; Pioneers Vorarlberg
- National team: Austria
- NHL draft: Undrafted
- Playing career: 2004–2026

Daniel Woger (born February 25, 1988) is an Austrian former professional ice hockey forward. He participated with the Austrian national team at the 2015 IIHF World Championship.

On 28 August 2020, Woger returned to his original youth club and team where he made his professional debut with Dornbirn Bulldogs, agreeing to a one-year contract.
