= Kleinholz Stadion =

Ice hockey stadium in Olten, Switzerland

Coordinates: 47.3430906°N 7.8925233°E

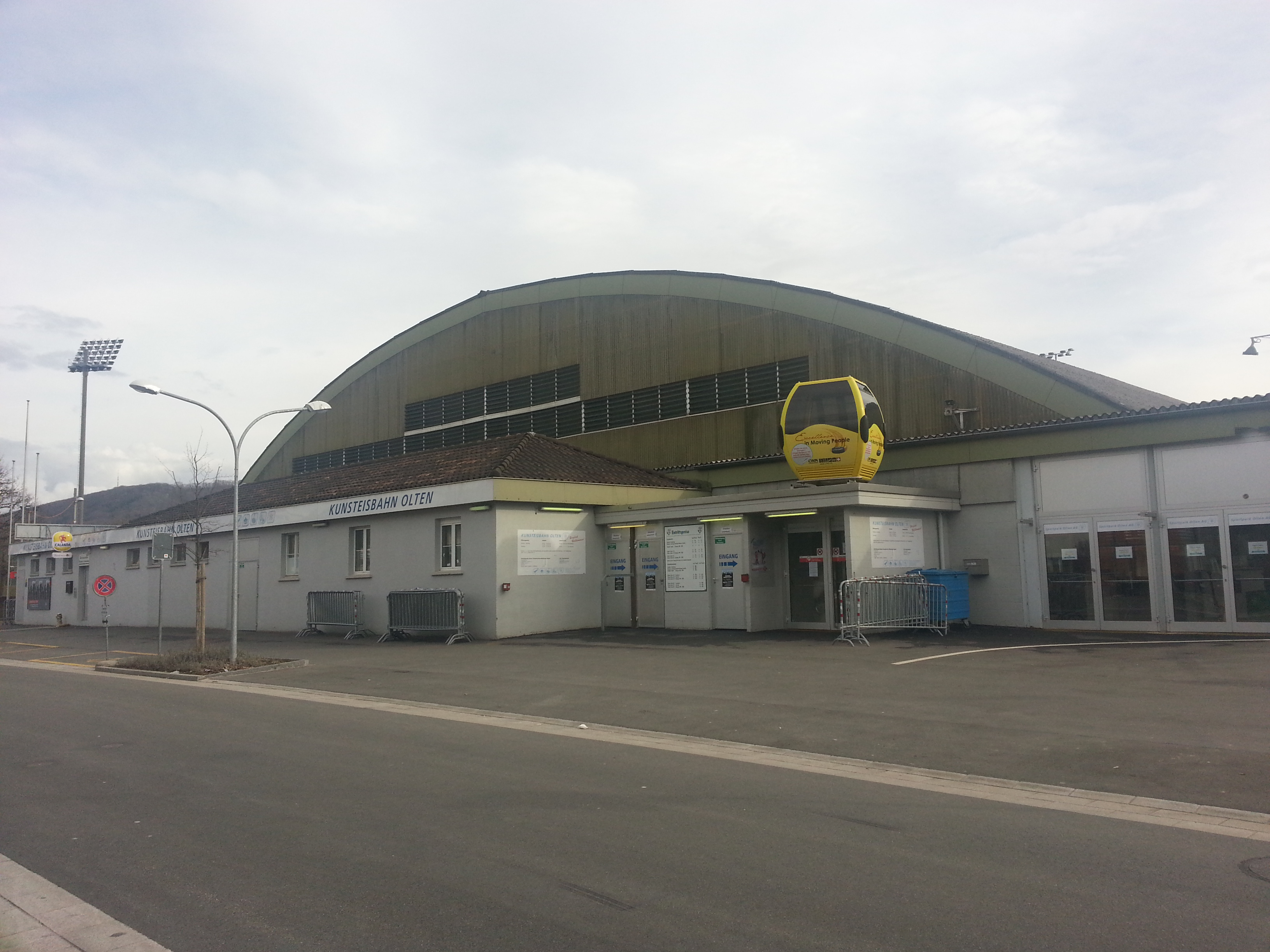
Stadion Kleinholz
Built	1961
Home Team	EHC Olten
Location	Olten, Switzerland
Capacity	6,500

The Kleinholz Stadion is an ice hockey stadium located in Olten, Switzerland. It is mainly used by EHC Olten, an ice hockey club that currently plays in the Swiss National League B. It was built in 1961 and renovated in 2014.
