= EHC Olten =

- City: Olten, Switzerland
- League: Swiss League
- Founded: 1934
- Home arena: Kleinholz Stadion capacity 5,384 (1,844 of which are seats)
- Colors
- General manager: Patrick Reber
- Head coach: Lars Leuenberger
- Captain: Larri Leeger
- Website: ehco.ch

Franchise history
- 1934–present: EHC Olten

EHC Olten is a Swiss professional ice hockey team based in Olten, Switzerland. It plays in the Swiss League, the second tier ice hockey league in Switzerland. It has claimed two Swiss League Championships, gaining promotion to the National League in 1985, 1988 and 1993.

== Honors ==
National League B Championships: (2) 1981, 1988
