= 2022–23 Champions Hockey League =

European ice hockey tournament

Tournament details
- Dates: 1 September 2022 – 18 February 2023
- Teams: 32

Final positions
- Champions: (Finland) Tappara (1st title)
- Runners-up: (Sweden) Luleå HF

Tournament statistics
- Games played: 125
- Attendance: 355,144 (2,841 per game)
- Scoring leader: (United States) Ryan Lasch (22 points)

Awards
- MVP: (Finland) Christian Heljanko

The 2022–23 Champions Hockey League was the eighth season of the Champions Hockey League, a European ice hockey tournament. The tournament is competed by 32 teams, with qualification being on sporting merits only. The six founding leagues will be represented by between three and five teams (based on a four-year league ranking), while seven "challenge leagues" will be to be represented by one team each.

Finnish team Tappara won their first Champions Hockey League title, defeating Swedish team Luleå HF 3–2 in the final. This made Tappara the second Finnish side to win the title. The title holders Rögle BK were defeated by Tappara in the quarterfinals with the total score 7–4.

American right winger Ryan Lasch from Swedish team Frölunda HC became the top scorer for the fifth time, scoring 22 points.

== Team allocation ==
A total of 32 teams from different European first-tier leagues will participate in the 2022–23 Champions Hockey League. Besides the Continental Cup champions and wild card invitee Olimpija Ljubljana, 24 teams from the six founding leagues, as well as the national champions from Denmark, France, the United Kingdom, Norway, Poland, Slovakia and Slovenia will participate. Belarusian teams were not invited to participate due to the current political situation in Belarus while a Ukrainian team HC Donbass was forced to withdraw from the competition due to the ongoing Russian invasion of Ukraine and was replaced with the Slovenian champions Olimpija Ljubljana.

The qualification criteria for national leagues is based on the following rules:

1. CHL champions
2. National league champions (play-off winners)
3. Regular season winners
4. Regular season runners-up
5. Regular season third-placed team
6. Regular season fourth-placed team
7. Regular season fifth-placed team

Note: the national league champions of the United Kingdom are determined following the regular season.

=== Teams ===
On 12 January 2022 it was decided that the 2021–22 season would not be accounted for in the league ranking and the status at the end of the 2019–20 season was taken into consideration to allocate places for the season.

Team	City/Area	League	Qualification	Participation	Previous best
(Sweden) Rögle BK	Ängelholm	Swedish Hockey League	2022 CHL winners	2nd	Champion
(Sweden) Färjestad BK	Karlstad	Swedish Hockey League	Play-off winners	5th	Round of 16
(Sweden) Luleå HF	Luleå	Swedish Hockey League	Regular season runners-up	5th	Champion
(Sweden) Skellefteå AIK	Skellefteå	Swedish Hockey League	Regular season third	7th	Semi-finals
(Sweden) Frölunda HC	Gothenburg	Swedish Hockey League	Regular season fourth	8th	Champion
(Switzerland) EV Zug	Zug	National League	Play-off winners	8th	Quarter-finals
(Switzerland) HC Fribourg-Gottéron	Fribourg	National League	Regular season runners-up	5th	Semi-finals
(Switzerland) ZSC Lions	Zürich	National League	Regular season third	7th	Quarter-finals
(Switzerland) SC Rapperswil-Jona Lakers	Rapperswil	National League	Regular season fourth	1st	First appearance
(Switzerland) HC Davos	Davos	National League	Regular season fifth	4th	Semi-finals
(Germany) Eisbären Berlin	Berlin	Deutsche Eishockey Liga	Play-off winners	6th	Round of 16
(Germany) Red Bull München	Munich	Deutsche Eishockey Liga	Regular season runners-up	7th	Final
(Germany) Grizzlys Wolfsburg	Wolfsburg	Deutsche Eishockey Liga	Regular season third	3rd	Round of 32
(Germany) Straubing Tigers	Straubing	Deutsche Eishockey Liga	Regular season fourth	1st	First appearance
(Finland) Tappara	Tampere	Liiga	Play-off winners	8th	Final
(Finland) Jukurit	Mikkeli	Liiga	Regular season runners-up	1st	First appearance
(Finland) Ilves	Tampere	Liiga	Regular season third	1st	First appearance
(Finland) TPS	Turku	Liiga	Regular season fourth	7th	Quarter-finals
(Czech Republic) Oceláři Třinec	Třinec	Czech Extraliga	Play-off winners	7th	Semi-finals
(Czech Republic) Mountfield HK	Hradec Králové	Czech Extraliga	Regular season winners	4th	Final
(Czech Republic) Sparta Praha	Prague	Czech Extraliga	Regular season third	5th	Final
(Austria) Red Bull Salzburg	Salzburg	ICE Hockey League	Play-off winners	7th	Semi-finals
(Austria) Villach SV	Villach	ICE Hockey League	Regular season runners-up	2nd	Group stage
(Hungary) Fehérvár AV19	Székesfehérvár	ICE Hockey League	Regular season third	1st	First appearance
(United Kingdom) Belfast Giants	Belfast	Elite Ice Hockey League	Regular season champions	2nd	Group stage
(France) Brûleurs de Loups	Grenoble	Ligue Magnus	Play-off winners	3rd	Group stage
(Slovakia) Slovan Bratislava	Bratislava	Tipos Extraliga	Play-off winners	2nd	Group stage
(Norway) Stavanger Oilers	Stavanger	Fjordkraftligaen	Play-off winners	5th	Round of 32
(Poland) GKS Katowice	Katowice	Polska Hokej Liga	Play-off winners	1st	First appearance
(Denmark) Aalborg Pirates	Aalborg	Metal Ligaen	Play-off winners	2nd	Group stage
(Poland) MKS Cracovia	Kraków	Polska Hokej Liga	Continental Cup winner	3rd	Group stage
(Slovenia) Olimpija Ljubljana	Ljubljana	Slovenian Ice Hockey League	Wild card	1st	First appearance

== Round and draw dates ==
The schedule of the competition is as follows.

Phase	Round	Draw date	First leg	Second leg
Group stage	Matchday 1	25 May 2022	1–2 September 2022	
Group stage	Matchday 2	25 May 2022	3–4 September 2022	
Group stage	Matchday 3	25 May 2022	8–9 September 2022	
Group stage	Matchday 4	25 May 2022	10–11 September 2022	
Group stage	Matchday 5	25 May 2022	4–5 October 2022	
Group stage	Matchday 6	25 May 2022	11–12 October 2022	
Playoff	Round of 16	13 October 2022	15–16 November 2022	22–23 November 2022
Playoff	Quarter-finals	13 October 2022	6–7 December 2022	13 December 2022
Playoff	Semi-finals	13 October 2022	10–11 January 2023	17–18 January 2023
Playoff	Final	13 October 2022	18 February 2023	

== Group stage ==
Teams in the 2022–23 Champions Hockey League
Black: Group A; Purple: Group B; Blue: Group C; Red: Group D; Orange: Group E; Green: Group F; White: Group G; Yellow: Group H.

For the group stage, the teams were drawn into 8 groups of 4 teams. Each team will play home and away against every other team for a total of six games. The best two teams will qualify to the round of 16.

The draw of the group stage took place on 25 May 2022 in Tampere, Finland.

=== Pots ===
The participating teams were seeded into Pots 1 to 4 according to their achievements in their national leagues and their respective league’s standing in the CHL league ranking. The reigning CHL champions Rögle BK were the top seeded team and therefore given a place in pot 1. In the top pot there were also the reigning champions of the six founding leagues and the regular season winner of SHL. The 16 remaining teams from the founding leagues were placed to pots 2 and 3. The fourth pot included the playoff champions from the seven challenge leagues and MKS Cracovia, winners of 2021–22 IIHF Continental Cup.

Pot 1	Pot 2	Pot 3	Pot 4
(Sweden) Rögle BK (Sweden) Färjestad BK (Switzerland) EV Zug (Germany) Eisbären Berlin (Finland) Tappara (Czech Republic) Oceláři Třinec (Austria) Red Bull Salzburg (Sweden) Luleå HF	(Switzerland) HC Fribourg-Gottéron (Germany) Red Bull München (Finland) Jukurit (Czech Republic) Mountfield HK (Austria) Villach SV (Sweden) Skellefteå AIK (Switzerland) ZSC Lions (Germany) Grizzlys Wolfsburg	(Finland) Ilves (Czech Republic) Sparta Praha (Hungary) Fehérvár AV19 (Sweden) Frölunda HC (Switzerland) SC Rapperswil-Jona Lakers (Germany) Straubing Tigers (Finland) TPS (Switzerland) HC Davos	(United Kingdom) Belfast Giants (France) Brûleurs de Loups (Slovakia) Slovan Bratislava (Norway) Stavanger Oilers (Poland) GKS Katowice (Denmark) Aalborg Pirates (Slovenia) Olimpija Ljubljana (Poland) MKS Cracovia

=== Group A ===
Pos	Team	Pld	W	OTW	OTL	L	GF	GA	GD	Pts	Qualification	LHF	JUK	AAL	SPA
1	(Sweden) Luleå HF	6	5	1	0	0	22	11	+11	17	Advance to Playoffs	—	4–3	2–1 (OT)	5–2
2	(Finland) Jukurit	6	4	0	0	2	22	15	+7	12	Advance to Playoffs	2–5	—	5–3	3–0
3	(Denmark) Aalborg Pirates	6	1	0	1	4	10	21	−11	4		1–3	0–3	—	2–6
4	(Czech Republic) Sparta Praha	6	1	0	0	5	15	22	−7	3		2–3	3–6	2–3	—

Source: Champions Hockey League

=== Group B ===
Pos	Team	Pld	W	OTW	OTL	L	GF	GA	GD	Pts	Qualification	EVZ	WOB	TPS	OLI
1	(Switzerland) EV Zug	6	5	1	0	0	27	9	+18	17	Advance to Playoffs	—	4–3 (OT)	6–1	5–2
2	(Germany) Grizzlys Wolfsburg	6	4	0	1	1	25	16	+9	13	Advance to Playoffs	2–5	—	5–4	7–2
3	(Finland) TPS	6	2	0	0	4	13	23	−10	6		0–4	1–4	—	3–2
4	(Slovenia) Olimpija Ljubljana	6	0	0	0	6	9	26	−17	0		1–3	0–4	2–4	—

Source: Champions Hockey League

=== Group C ===
Pos	Team	Pld	W	OTW	OTL	L	GF	GA	GD	Pts	Qualification	TAP	RBM	RAP	SLV
1	(Finland) Tappara	6	4	1	1	0	20	9	+11	15	Advance to Playoffs	—	4–0	2–3 (OT)	2–0
2	(Germany) Red Bull München	6	3	1	1	1	21	15	+6	12	Advance to Playoffs	3–4 (SO)	—	5–4 (OT)	5–1
3	(Switzerland) SC Rapperswil-Jona Lakers	6	2	1	1	2	19	19	0	9		1–3	1–4	—	4–1
4	(Slovakia) Slovan Bratislava	6	0	0	0	6	9	26	−17	0		2–5	1–4	4–6	—

Source: Champions Hockey League

=== Group D ===
Pos	Team	Pld	W	OTW	OTL	L	GF	GA	GD	Pts	Qualification	RBK	ZSC	FEH	KAT
1	(Sweden) Rögle BK	6	5	1	0	0	26	12	+14	17	Advance to Playoffs	—	3–2 (OT)	7–1	5–1
2	(Switzerland) ZSC Lions	6	3	0	2	1	23	12	+11	11	Advance to Playoffs	3–4	—	5–1	5–1
3	(Hungary) Fehérvár AV19	6	2	0	0	4	9	23	−14	6		1–2	1–7	—	1–0
4	(Poland) GKS Katowice	6	0	1	0	5	10	21	−11	2		4–5	2–1 (OT)	2–4	—

Source: Champions Hockey League

=== Group E ===
Pos	Team	Pld	W	OTW	OTL	L	GF	GA	GD	Pts	Qualification	FRI	RBS	OIL	ILV
1	(Switzerland) HC Fribourg-Gottéron	6	4	1	0	1	12	5	+7	14	Advance to Playoffs	—	3–2 (SO)	0–1	3–2
2	(Austria) Red Bull Salzburg	6	0	3	2	1	12	12	0	8 (Note: Head-to-head points: Red Bull Salzburg 4, Stavanger Oilers 2)	Advance to Playoffs	0–1	—	3–2 (OT)	2–3 (OT)
3	(Norway) Stavanger Oilers	6	2	0	2	2	10	15	−5	8		0–3	2–3 (SO)	—	4–2
4	(Finland) Ilves	6	1	1	1	3	12	14	−2	6		0–2	1–2 (OT)	4–1	—

Source: Champions Hockey League

=== Group F ===
Pos	Team	Pld	W	OTW	OTL	L	GF	GA	GD	Pts	Qualification	STR	FBK	CRA	VSV
1	(Germany) Straubing Tigers	6	5	0	0	1	24	11	+13	15	Advance to Playoffs	—	5–2	3–2	8–0
2	(Sweden) Färjestad BK	6	4	0	0	2	25	12	+13	12	Advance to Playoffs	6–1	—	5–1	7–0
3	(Poland) MKS Cracovia	6	2	0	0	4	13	23	−10	6		0–4	4–3	—	4–2
4	(Austria) Villach SV	6	1	0	0	5	10	26	−16	3		1–3	1–2	6–2	—

Source: Champions Hockey League

=== Group G ===
Pos	Team	Pld	W	OTW	OTL	L	GF	GA	GD	Pts	Qualification	MHK	FHC	BER	GRE
1	(Czech Republic) Mountfield HK	6	5	0	0	1	29	17	+12	15 (Note: The higher number of goals in one of the head-to-head matches: Mountfield HK 5, Frölunda HC 4)	Advance to Playoffs	—	5–3	8–2	3–2
2	(Sweden) Frölunda HC	6	5	0	0	1	34	16	+18	15	Advance to Playoffs	4–2	—	7–1	7–4
3	(Germany) Eisbären Berlin	6	2	0	0	4	21	29	−8	6		3–7	2–3	—	5–2
4	(France) Brûleurs de Loups	6	0	0	0	6	15	37	−22	0		3–4	2–10	2–8	—

Source: Champions Hockey League
Rules for classification: Group stage tiebreakers

=== Group H ===
Pos	Team	Pld	W	OTW	OTL	L	GF	GA	GD	Pts	Qualification	SKE	HCD	TRI	BEL
1	(Sweden) Skellefteå AIK	6	4	1	0	1	23	14	+9	14	Advance to Playoffs	—	2–3	3–2 (OT)	4–1
2	(Switzerland) HC Davos	6	4	0	0	2	23	15	+8	12	Advance to Playoffs	2–5	—	4–0	5–1
3	(Czech Republic) Oceláři Třinec	6	2	0	2	2	16	18	−2	8		4–5	4–3	—	4–0
4	(United Kingdom) Belfast Giants	6	0	1	0	5	10	25	−15	2		2–4	3–6	3–2 (OT)	—

Source: Champions Hockey League

=== Group stage tie-breaking criteria ===
Teams were ranked according to points (3 points for a win in regulation time, 2 points for a win in overtime, 1 point for a loss in overtime, 0 points for a loss in regulation time). If two or more teams were tied on points, the following tiebreaking criteria were applied, in the order given, to determine the rankings (see 8.4.4. Tie breaking formula group stage standings):

1. Points in head-to-head matches among the tied teams;
2. Goal difference in head-to-head matches among the tied teams;
3. Goals scored in head-to-head matches among the tied teams;
4. The higher number of goals in one of the matches among the tied teams;
5. The most goals in the two game winning shot series;
6. If more than two teams are tied, head-to-head criteria 1, 2 and 3 are reapplied exclusively to this subset of teams;
7. If more than two teams are tied, and after applying head-to-head criteria 1, 2 and 3, a subset of teams are still tied, goal difference and goals scored then the results between each of the three teams and the closest best-ranked team outside the subset was applied; best-ranked team outside the sub-group was applied;
8. The higher position in the 2021–22 Champions Hockey League club ranking;
9. Goal difference in all group matches;
10. Goals scored in all group matches;
11. Regulation time wins in all group matches;
12. Overtime wins in all group matches;
13. Overtime losses in all group matches.

== Playoffs ==
=== Qualified teams ===
The knockout phase involves the 16 teams which qualify as winners and runners-up of each of the eight groups in the group stage.

Group	Winners (seeded in round of 16 draw)	Runners-up (unseeded in round of 16 draw)
A	(Sweden) Luleå HF	(Finland) Jukurit
B	(Switzerland) EV Zug	(Germany) Grizzlys Wolfsburg
C	(Finland) Tappara	(Germany) Red Bull München
D	(Sweden) Rögle BK	(Switzerland) ZSC Lions
E	(Switzerland) HC Fribourg-Gottéron	(Austria) Red Bull Salzburg
F	(Germany) Straubing Tigers	(Sweden) Färjestad BK
G	(Czech Republic) Mountfield HK	(Sweden) Frölunda HC
H	(Sweden) Skellefteå AIK	(Switzerland) HC Davos

=== Format ===
In each round except the final, the teams play two games and the aggregate score decides which team advances. As a rule, the first leg is hosted by the team who has the inferior record in the tournament with the second leg being played on the home ice of the other team. If aggregate score is tied, a sudden death overtime follows. If the overtime is scoreless, the team who wins the shoot out competition advances.

The final will be played on the home ice of the team who has the better record in the tournament.

=== Bracket ===
The eight group winners and the eight second-placed teams advanced to the round of 16. The teams were divided into two seeding groups and group winners were randomly drawn against runners-up. Teams who had faced each other in the group stage could not be drawn against each other in the round of 16.

Round of 16
(Sweden) Färjestad BK	4	2	6
(Czech Republic) Mountfield HK (OT)	3	4	7
(Germany) Red Bull München	1	1	2
(Switzerland) EV Zug	5	5	10
(Austria) Red Bull Salzburg	3	1	4
(Sweden) Rögle BK	1	5	6
(Switzerland) HC Davos	0	2	2
(Finland) Tappara	1	2	3
(Finland) Jukurit (OT)	1	2	3
(Switzerland) HC Fribourg-Gottéron	1	1	2
(Germany) Grizzlys Wolfsburg	2	1	3
(Sweden) Luleå HF	3	2	5
(Sweden) Skellefteå AIK	5	4	9
(Switzerland) ZSC Lions	4	1	5
(Sweden) Frölunda HC	4	3	7
(Germany) Straubing Tigers	0	2	2

Quarter-finals
(Czech Republic) Mountfield HK	2	1	3
(Switzerland) EV Zug (OT)	2	2	4
(Sweden) Rögle BK	3	1	4
(Finland) Tappara	2	5	7
(Finland) Jukurit	1	1	2
(Sweden) Luleå HF	5	3	8
(Sweden) Skellefteå AIK	1	2	3
(Sweden) Frölunda HC (SO)	0	4	4

Semi-finals
(Switzerland) EV Zug	0	2	2
(Finland) Tappara	2	3	5
(Sweden) Luleå HF (SO)	2	4	6
(Sweden) Frölunda HC	2	3	5

Final
(Finland) Tappara	3
(Sweden) Luleå HF	2

=== Round of 16 ===
The draw for the entire playoff was held on 13 October 2022 in Zürich. The first legs were played on 15 and 16 November with return legs played on 22 and 23 November 2022.

Team 1	Agg.	Team 2	1st leg	2nd leg
Färjestad BK (Sweden)	6–7 (OT)	(Czech Republic) Mountfield HK	4–3	2–4
Red Bull München (Germany)	2–10	(Switzerland) EV Zug	1–5	1–5
Red Bull Salzburg (Austria)	4–6	(Sweden) Rögle BK	3–1	1–5
HC Davos (Switzerland)	2–3	(Finland) Tappara	0–1	2–2
Jukurit (Finland)	3–2 (OT)	(Switzerland) HC Fribourg-Gottéron	1–1	2–1
Grizzlys Wolfsburg (Germany)	3–5	(Sweden) Luleå HF	2–3	1–2
Skellefteå AIK (Sweden)	9–5	(Switzerland) ZSC Lions	5–4	4–1
Frölunda HC (Sweden)	7–2	(Germany) Straubing Tigers	4–0	3–2

Order of legs reversed after original draw.

==== First Leg ====
15 November 2022; 18:00 CET	Grizzlys Wolfsburg (Germany)	2–3 (1–2, 0–0, 1–1)	(Sweden) Luleå HF	Eis Arena Wolfsburg, Wolfsburg; Attendance: 1,812

Game reference

Dustin Strahlmeier
Goalies
Matteus Ward
Referees:
Jan Hribik
Michał Baca
Linesmen:
Kai Jürgens
Wayne Gerth

	0–1	3:38 – (PP) Shinnimin (Connolly, Tyrväinen)
	0–2	7:46 – Komarek (Fröberg, Engsund)
Archibald (Schinko, Pfohl) – 17:18	1–2
	1–3	47:23 – Honka (Komarov, Connolly)
Beaudin (Mingoia, Murray) – 52:55	2–3

12 min
Penalties
4 min
21
Shots
36

15 November 2022; 18:00 CET	Jukurit (Finland)	1–1 (1–0, 0–1, 0–0)	(Switzerland) HC Fribourg-Gottéron	Ikioma Arena, Mikkeli; Attendance: 2,331

Game reference
Frans Tuohimaa	Goalies	Connor Hughes	Referees: Mikael Nord; Christian Bo Persson; Linesmen: Onni Hautamaki; Lauri Nikulainen
Aaltonen – 11:38 / 1–0; / 1–1 / 23:16 – Gunderson (Kuokkanen, Sprunger)			Referees: Mikael Nord; Christian Bo Persson; Linesmen: Onni Hautamaki; Lauri Nikulainen
4 min	Penalties	6 min	Referees: Mikael Nord; Christian Bo Persson; Linesmen: Onni Hautamaki; Lauri Nikulainen
13	Shots	26	Referees: Mikael Nord; Christian Bo Persson; Linesmen: Onni Hautamaki; Lauri Nikulainen

15 November 2022; 18:05 CET	Frölunda HC (Sweden)	4–0 (0–0, 3–0, 1–0)	(Germany) Straubing Tigers	Frölundaborg, Gothenburg; Attendance: 1,781

Game reference

Lars Johansson
Goalies
Florian Manuel Bugl
Referees:
Lassi Heikkinen
Roy Stian Hansen
Linesmen:
Anders Nyqvist
Ludvig Lundgren

Lundqvist (Carlsson, Johansson) – 26:39	1–0
Rosseli Olsen – 31:41	2–0
Lundqvist (Lasch, Friberg) (PP) – 39:55	3–0
Nilsson (Lindbohm, Lasu) – 56:57	4–0

6 min
Penalties
18 min
42
Shots
22

15 November 2022; 18:05 CET	Färjestad BK (Sweden)	4–3 (1–1, 2–2, 1–0)	(Czech Republic) Mountfield HK	Löfbergs Arena, Karlstad; Attendance: 1,637

Game reference

Matthew Tomkins
Goalies
Jan Růžička
Referees:
Daniel Stricker
Martin Christensen
Linesmen:
Peter Almerstedt
Gustav Jonsson

Nygård (Åslund, Elie) – 2:29	1–0
	1–1	3:43 – McCormack
	1–2	24:44 – Štohanzl (Doležal, Pilař)
	1–3	30:15 – Doležal (Smoleňák)
Nilsson, (Ejdsell, Lindqvist) – 30:36	2–3
Elie (Åslund, Berglund) – 33:11	3–3
Nyström (Lindqvist, Johansson) (PP) – 44:17	4–3

8 min
Penalties
6 min
28
Shots
34

15 November 2022; 19:30 CET	Red Bull München (Germany)	1–5 (0–3, 0–2, 1–0)	(Switzerland) EV Zug	Olympia Eishalle, Munich; Attendance: 4,283

Game reference

Danny aus den Birken (pulled at 27:24) Daniel Allavena
Goalies
Leonardo Genoni
Referees:
Jakub Šindel
Andrew Dalton
Linesmen:
Joshua Römer
Tobias Schwenk

	0–1	6:45 – (PP) Senteler (O'Neill, Martschini)
	0–2	7:10 – Simion (Kreis, Kovář)
	0–3	13:06 – Cehlárik (O'Neill)
	0–4	22:16 – Senteler (Zehnder, Herzog)
	0–5	27:24 – Cehlárik (O'Neill, Djoos)
Varejcka (Boyle, Schütz) – 44:33	1–5

6 min
Penalties
6 min
22
Shots
29

15 November 2022; 19:45 CET	HC Davos (Switzerland)	0–1 (0–0, 0–1, 0–0)	(Finland) Tappara	Eisstadion Davos, Davos; Attendance: 1,389

Game reference
Gilles Senn	Goalies	Christian Heljanko	Referees: Marcus Linde; Andrea Moschen; Linesmen: David Obwegeser; Dario Fuchs
0–1 / 32:15 – (SH) Puhakka (Rauhala)			Referees: Marcus Linde; Andrea Moschen; Linesmen: David Obwegeser; Dario Fuchs
2 min	Penalties	4 min	Referees: Marcus Linde; Andrea Moschen; Linesmen: David Obwegeser; Dario Fuchs
23	Shots	25	Referees: Marcus Linde; Andrea Moschen; Linesmen: David Obwegeser; Dario Fuchs

15 November 2022; 20:20 CET	Red Bull Salzburg (Austria)	3–1 (0–0, 1–1, 2–0)	(Sweden) Rögle BK	Eisarena Salzburg, Salzburg; Attendance: 2,745

Game reference

Atte Tolvanen
Goalies
Calle Clang
Referees:
Marian Rohatsch
Gregor Rezek
Linesmen:
David Nothegger
Elias Seewald

Robertson (Meyer, Wukovits) – 28:57	1–0
	1–1	38:42 – (PP) Larsson (Lyrenäs, Rosdahl)
Huber ( Meyer, Genoway) (PP) – 44:55	2–1
Nissner (Schneider) – 58:18	3–1

8 min
Penalties
6 min
28
Shots
26

16 November 2022; 19:05 CET	Skellefteå AIK (Sweden)	5–4 (2–2, 1–2, 2–0)	(Switzerland) ZSC Lions	Skellefteå Kraft Arena, Skellefteå; Attendance: 2,712

Game reference

Linus Söderström
Goalies
Šimon Hrubec
Referees:
Mikko Kaukokari
Tomáš Hronský
Linesmen:
Emil Yletyinen
Tobias Nordlander

	0–1	5:49 – (SH) Schappi
Lindström (Nilsson, Lindholm) (PP) – 6:13	1–1
Sandberg (Pudas, Hugg) (PP) – 12:07	2–1
	2–2	13:53 (PP) – Riedi (Hollenstein, Andrighetto)
	2–3	29:43 – (SH) Texier
Sandberg (Lindström, Olsson) – 32:49	3–3
	3–4	36:40 – (PP) Hollenstein (Andrighetto, Azevedo)
Lindholm (Lindholm, Lindström) (PP) – 44:42	4–4
Lindström (Sandberg, Lindholm) – 48:03	5–4

14 min
Penalties
41 min
28
Shots
29

==== Second Leg ====
22 November 2022; 17:30 CET	Mountfield HK (Czech Republic)	4–2 (OT) (2–0, 1–1, 0–1) (OT 1–0)	(Sweden) Färjestad BK	ČPP Arena, Hradec Králové; Attendance: 3,111

Game reference

Henri Kiviaho
Goalies
Matthew Tomkins
Referees:
Ladislav Smetana
Marek Žák
Linesmen:
Josef Špůr
Daniel Hynek

Klíma (Piegl) – 4:13	1–0
Cingel (Lev, Okuliar) (PP) – 7:43	2–0
Pilař (Klíma, Jank) – 28:06	3–0
	3–1	36:23 – Lawner (Lindqvist)
	3–2	53:37 – (PP) Lindqvist (Nilsson)
Cingel (Blain, Jergl) – 67:06	4–2

6 min
Penalties
6 min
48
Shots
32

Mountfield HK won 7–6 on aggregate in Overtime.

22 November 2022; 18:00 CET	Tappara (Finland)	2–2 (0–0, 0–1, 2–1)	(Switzerland) HC Davos	Nokia Arena, Tampere; Attendance: 5,117

Game reference

Christian Heljanko
Goalies
Sandro Aeschlimann
Referees:
Gordon Schukies
Trpimir Piragić
Linesmen:
Tommi Niittylä
Joni Pekkala

	0–1	38:27 – Corvi (Stránský, Nordström)
Kemiläinen (Matushkin, Lehterä) – 44:25	1–1
Luoto (Rönni, Seppälä), – 44:49	2–1
	2–2	48:47 – (SH) Corvi

6 min
Penalties
10 min
23
Shots
38

Tappara won 3–2 on aggregate.

22 November 2022; 18:05 CET	Luleå HF (Sweden)	2–1 (0–0, 0–1, 2–0)	(Germany) Grizzlys Wolfsburg	Coop Norrbotten Arena, Luleå; Attendance: 2,780

Game reference

Matteus Ward
Goalies
Dustin Strahlmeier
Referees:
Joonas Kova
Lukas Kohlmüller
Linesmen:
Emil Yletyinen
Daniel Persson

	0–1	30:56 – Morley (Rakhshani, Zajac)
Komarek (Gustafsson, Tyrväinen) (PP) – 47:07	1–1
Engsund (SHENG) – 59:59	2–1

8 min
Penalties
6 min
34
Shots
21

Luleå HF won 5–3 on aggregate.

22 November 2022; 18:05 CET	Rögle BK (Sweden)	5–1 (1–0, 3–1, 1–0)	(Austria) Red Bull Salzburg	Catena Arena, Ängelholm; Attendance: 3,443

Game reference

Christoffer Rifalk
Goalies
Atte Tolvanen
Referees:
Kristian Vikman
Mark Lemelin
Linesmen:
Rickard Nilsson
Andréas Svensson

Larsson (Lyrenäs, Kasper) – 2:27	1–0
Tambellini (Engström) (PP) – 20:19	2–0
Tärnström (Sjödin, Lesund) – 24:34	3–0
Kasper (Zaar, Larsson) (PP) – 28:57	4–0
	4–1	38:43 – (PP) Raffl Schneider, Heinrich)
Larsson (Lyrenäs, Kapla) (PP) – 43:12	5–1

8 min
Penalties
12 min
33
Shots
25

Rögle BK won 6–4 on aggregate.

22 November 2022; 19:30 CET	Straubing Tigers (Germany)	2–3 (1–1, 1–1, 0–1)	(Sweden) Frölunda HC	Eisstadion am Pulverturm, Straubing; Attendance: 4,480

Game reference

Hunter Miska
Goalies
Frederik Dichow
Referees:
Daniel Pražák
Jakub Šindel
Linesmen:
Andreas Hofer
Marius Wölzmüller

	0–1	13:34 – Lasch (Lasu, Lindbohm)
Manning (Akeson, Scheid) – 15:33	1–1
Brandt (Leier, Connolly) (PP 5 on 3) – 28:02	2–1
	2–2	37:12 – Carlsson (Grönlund, Lasch)
	2–3	56:22 – (ENG) Dichow

33 min
Penalties
33 min
19
Shots
26

Frölunda HC won 7–2 on aggregate.

22 November 2022; 19:45 CET	HC Fribourg-Gottéron (Switzerland)	1–2 (OT) (0–0, 1–1, 0–0) (OT 0–1)	(Finland) Jukurit	BCF Arena, Fribourg; Attendance: 4,321

Game reference

Referees:
Linus Öhlund
Milan Zrnić
Linesmen:
Thomas Wolf
David Obwegeser

	0–1	23:42 – Puistola (Mäkinen)
Marchon (Walser, Jecker) – 27:59	1–1
	1–2	61:59 – Immonen (Puistola, Tuohimaa)

2 min
Penalties
8 min
34
Shots
22

Jukurit won 3–2 on aggregate in Overtime.

22 November 2022; 19:45 CET	ZSC Lions (Switzerland)	1–4 (0–0, 1–3, 0–1)	(Sweden) Skellefteå AIK	Swiss Life Arena, Zurich; Attendance: 4,015

Game reference

Šimon Hrubec
Goalies
Linus Söderström
Referees:
Robin Šír
Antonín Jeřábek
Linesmen:
Eric Cattaneo
Dominik Altmann

	0–1	23:47 – (PP) Sandberg (Lindholm, Lindström)
	0–2	25:48 – Wingerli (Lindholm, Lindholm)
Baltisberger (Wallmark, Texier) (PP) – 30:28	1–2
	1–3	37:12 – (PP) Lindholm Lindholm, Lindström)
	1–4	58:43 – (ENG) Hugg (Lundberg)

10 min
Penalties
8 min
27
Shots
16

Skellefteå AIK won 9–5 on aggregate.

23 November 2022; 19:45 CET	EV Zug (Switzerland)	5–1 (1–1, 3–0, 1–0)	(Germany) Red Bull München	Bossard Arena, Zug; Attendance: 4,497

Game reference

Leonardo Genoni
Goalies
Mathias Niederberger
Referees:
Tobias Björk
Peter Stano
Linesmen:
David Obwegeser
Dario Fuchs

Hofmann (Kovář, Kreis) – 0:49	1–0
	1–1	11:56 – Smith (Eder
Allenspach – 23:50	2–1
Herzog (Djoos, Genoni) – 29:54	3–1
Kreis (Cehlárik, O'Neill (PP) – 33:05	4–1
Zehnder (Herzog, Leuenberger) (PP) – 46:02	5–1

8 min
Penalties
35 min
32
Shots
19

EV Zug won 10–2 on aggregate.

=== Quarter-finals ===
First legs were played on 6 and 7 December with return legs played on 13 December 2022.

Team 1	Agg.	Team 2	1st leg	2nd leg
Mountfield HK (Czech Republic)	3–4 (OT)	(Switzerland) EV Zug	2–2	1–2
Rögle BK (Sweden)	4–7	(Finland) Tappara	3–2	1–5
Luleå HF (Sweden)	8–2	(Finland) Jukurit	5–1	3–1
Skellefteå AIK (Sweden)	3–4 (SO)	(Sweden) Frölunda HC	1–0	2–4

==== First Leg ====
6 December 2022; 18:05 CET	Rögle BK (Sweden)	3–2 (2–0, 1–0, 0–2)	(Finland) Tappara	Catena Arena, Ängelholm; Attendance: 3,268

Game reference

Calle Clang
Goalies
Christian Heljanko
Referees:
Lasse Kopitz
Sean MacFarlane
Linesmen:
Andréas Svensson
Anders Nyqvist

Pettersson (Sjödin, Tärnström) – 2:27	1–0
Sandin (SH) – 7:41	2–0
Lyrenäs (Tambellini) – 29:19	3–0
	3–1	48:22 – Ojamäki
	3–2	52:39 – Kemiläinen (Matushkin, Ojamäki)

10 min
Penalties
12 min
21
Shots
31

6 December 2022; 19:05 CET	Luleå HF (Sweden)	5–1 (1–0, 1–0, 3–1)	(Finland) Jukurit	Coop Norrbotten Arena, Luleå; Attendance: 1,404

Game reference

Matteus Ward
Goalies
Frans Tuohimaa
Referees:
Cedric Borga
Ladislav Smetana
Linesmen:
Rasmus Strömberg
Daniel Persson

Shinnimin (Andersson, Sellgren) – 2:08	1–0
Shinnimin (Mattsson, Pyrochta) – 22:47	2–0
Berglund (Emanuelsson) – 45:46	3–0
Brännström (Kempe) – 51:05	4–0
Andersson (Honka, Komarov) (PP 5 On 3) – 56:36	5–0
	5–1	58:38 – Jurmo (Immonen)

4 min
Penalties
56 min
33
Shots
15

6 December 2022; 19:05 CET	Skellefteå AIK (Sweden)	1–0 ( 1-0, 0-0, 0-0)	(Sweden) Frölunda HC	Skellefteå Kraft Arena, Skellefteå; Attendance: 2,108

Game reference
Linus Söderström	Goalies	Lars Johansson	Referees: Lassi Heikkinen; Joonas Kova; Linesmen: Tobias Nordlander; Emil Yletyinen
Wingerli (SH) - 17:21 / 1-0			Referees: Lassi Heikkinen; Joonas Kova; Linesmen: Tobias Nordlander; Emil Yletyinen
4 min	Penalties	6 min	Referees: Lassi Heikkinen; Joonas Kova; Linesmen: Tobias Nordlander; Emil Yletyinen
24	Shots	20	Referees: Lassi Heikkinen; Joonas Kova; Linesmen: Tobias Nordlander; Emil Yletyinen

7 December 2022; 17:30 CET	Mountfield HK (Czech Republic)	2–2 (0-1, 0-0, 2-1)	(Switzerland) EV Zug	ČPP Arena, Hradec Králové; Attendance: 3,012

Game reference

Henri Kiviaho
Goalies
Leonardo Genoni
Referees:
Sirko Hunnius
Manuel Nikolić
Linesmen:
Jiří Ondráček
Jiří Svoboda

	0–1	10:39 - Martschini (Cehlárik, Geisser)
Cingel (Lev, Jank) - 55:08	1–1
Zachar (Okuliar, Pavlík) - 56:55	2–1
	2–2	58:41 - Djoos (Leuenberger)

4 min
Penalties
6 min
22
Shots
16

==== Second Leg ====
13 December 2022; 17:35 CET	Tappara (Finland)	5–1 (0–0, 2–1, 3–0)	(Sweden) Rögle BK	Nokia Arena, Tampere; Attendance: 4,584

Game reference

Christian Heljanko
Goalies
Christoffer Rifalk
Referees:
Michael Tscherrig
Marian Rohatsch
Linesmen:
Tommi Niittylä
Lauri Nikulainen

Lehterä (Tanus, Ojamäki) – 21:51	1–0
Savinainen (Tanus, Matushkin) – 37:15	2–0
	2–1	38:20 – Edström (Sandin, Ferguson)
Ojamäki (Savinainen, Tanus) (PP) – 53:19	3–1
Ojamäki (Tuulola, Virta) (ENG) – 58:55	4–1
Savinainen (Kuusela, Kemiläinen) (ENG) – 59:33	5–1

4 min
Penalties
4 min
33
Shots
28

Tappara won 7–4 on Aggregate.

13 December 2022; 18:05 CET	Jukurit (Finland)	1–3 (0–2, 1–0, 0–1)	(Sweden) Luleå HF	Ikioma Arena, Mikkeli; Attendance: 1,223

Game reference

Markus Ruusu
Goalies
Matteus Ward
Referees:
André Schrader
Miroslav Stolc
Linesmen:
Onni Hautamaki
Hannu Sormunen

	0–1	4:00 – Komarek (Emanuelsson, Tyrväinen)
	0–2	17:43 – Shinnimin (Nikupeteri)
Piitulainen (Puistola, Häkkilä) (PP) – 30:09	1–2
	1–3	48:52 – Tyrväinen (Engsund, Emanuelsson)

4 min
Penalties
6 min
16
Shots
35

Luleå won 8–2 on Aggregate.

13 December 2022; 19:05 CET	Frölunda HC (Sweden)	4–2 (2–0 SO) (0–0, 2–1, 1–1) (0–0) (SO 1–0)	(Sweden) Skellefteå AIK	Frölundaborg, Gothenburg; Attendance: 2,953

Game reference

Lars Johansson
Goalies
Linus Söderström
Referees:
Mark Lemelin
Anssi Salonen
Linesmen:
Gustav Jonsson
Rickard Nilsson

Borgman (Lasch, Friberg) (PP) – 27:07	1–0
	1–1	28:59 – (PP) Wingerli (Lindholm, Lindström)
Nilsson (Borgman, Lasch) (PP) – 30:57	2–1
	2–2	41:04 – Forsfjäll (Jonsson, Hugg)
Johansson (Eriksson, Greco) – 48:20	3–2
Lasch (SOG) – 70:00	4–2

Nilsson (miss)
Lasch
Friberg
Carlsson (miss)
Shootout
(miss) Robertsson
(miss) Sandin-Pellika
(miss) Lindström
(miss) Möller
8 min
Penalties
12 min
37
Shots
31

Frölunda HC won 4–3 on Aggregate after winning 2–0 in the shootout.

13 December 2022; 19:45 CET	EV Zug (Switzerland)	2–1 (OT) (0-0, 1-1, 0-0) (OT 1–0)	Mountfield HK (Czech Republic)	Bossard Arena, Zug; Attendance: 3,953

Game reference

Leonardo Genoni
Goalies
Henri Kiviaho
Referees:
Mikael Nord
Mikael Sjöqvist
Linesmen:
Eric Cattaneo
Dario Fuchs

Abdelkader (Suri, Schlumpf) - 23:42	1-0
	1-1	27:46 - Jergl (Perret, Rosandić)
O'Neill (Simion, Kreis) - 63:49	2-1

10 min
Penalties
8 min
32
Shots
29

EV Zug won 4–3 in Overtime on Aggregate.

=== Semi-finals ===
First legs were played on 10 January with return legs played on 17 January 2023.

Team 1	Agg.	Team 2	1st leg	2nd leg
Tappara (Finland)	5–2	(Switzerland) EV Zug	2–0	3–2
Frölunda HC (Sweden)	5–6 (SO)	(Sweden) Luleå HF	2–2	3–4

==== First Leg ====
10 January 2023; 17:30 CET	Tappara (Finland)	2–0 (1–0, 1–0, 0–0)	(Switzerland) EV Zug	Nokia Arena, Tampere; Attendance: 5,516

Game reference
Christian Heljanko	Goalies	Leonardo Genoni	Referees: Mikael Holm; Linus Öhlund; Linesmen: Niko Jusi; Tommi Niittylä
Seppälä (Davidsson, Puhakka) – 1:12 / 1–0; Ojamäki (Lehterä, Kemiläinen) (PP) – 32:20 / 2–0			Referees: Mikael Holm; Linus Öhlund; Linesmen: Niko Jusi; Tommi Niittylä
6 min	Penalties	12 min	Referees: Mikael Holm; Linus Öhlund; Linesmen: Niko Jusi; Tommi Niittylä
26	Shots	21	Referees: Mikael Holm; Linus Öhlund; Linesmen: Niko Jusi; Tommi Niittylä

10 January 2023; 18:05 CET	Frölunda HC (Sweden)	2–2 (1–0, 0–2, 1–0)	(Sweden) Luleå HF	Frölundaborg, Gothenburg; Attendance: 4,162

Game reference

Lars Johansson
Goalies
Matteus Ward
Referees:
Andre Schrader
Marian Rohatsch
Linesmen:
Ludvig Lundgren
Anders Nyqvist

Borgman (Mursak) – 7:49	1–0
	1–1	26:22 – (PP) Shinnimin (Tyrväinen, Connolly)
	1–2	35:16 – Rask (Nikupeteri, Berglund)
Friberg (Borgman, Grönlund) – 57:16	2–2

8 min
Penalties
12 min
26
Shots
21

==== Second Leg ====
17 January 2023; 18:05 CET	Luleå HF (Sweden)	4–3 (3–2 SO) (0–0, 3–2, 0–1) (0–0) (SO 1–0)	(Sweden) Frölunda HC	Coop Norrbotten Arena, Luleå; Attendance: 4,045

Game reference

Matteus Ward
Goalies
Lars Johansson
Referees:
Miroslav Stolc
Mark Lemelin
Linesmen:
Gustav Jonsson
Rickard Nilsson

Gustafsson (Tyrväinen (PP) – 20:30	1–0
	1–1	27:33 – Johansson (Lasu, Hasa)
	1–2	30:10 Lundqvist (Carlsson, Nilsson)
Sellgren (Fröberg) – 32:21	2–2
Brännström (Honka, Tyrväinen) – 39:19	3–2
	3–3	42:52 – Lindbohm
Shinnimin (SOG) – 70:00	4–3

Tyrväinen (miss)
Connolly
Komarek (miss)
Brännström
Kempe (miss)
Connolly (miss)
Brännström (miss)
Shinnimin
Shootout
Friberg
Lasch
(miss) Nilsson
(miss) Carlsson
(miss) Innala
(miss) Friberg
(miss) Lasch
(miss) Greco
31 min
Penalties
37 min
8
Shots
4

Luleå HF won 6–5 on aggregate after winning 3–2 in the shootout.

17 January 2023; 20:15 CET	EV Zug (Switzerland)	2–3 (1–0, 0–1, 1–2)	(Finland) Tappara	Bossard Arena, Zug; Attendance: 5,531

Game reference

Christian Heljanko
Goalies
Leonardo Genoni
Referees:
Tobias Björk
Mikael Nord
Linesmen:
Dominik Altmann
David Obwegeser

Suri (Abdelkader) – 15:23	1–0
	1–1	35:18 – Virta (Ojamäki, Matushkin)
Herzog (Kovář, Simion) (PP) – 40:38	2–1
	2–2	57:50 – (ENG) Puhakka (Lehterä
	2–3	58:39 – (ENG) Lehterä (Puhakka)

0 min
Penalties
8 min
40
Shots
21

Tappara won 5–2 on aggregate.

=== Final ===
18 February 2023; 16:20 (UTC+1)	Luleå HF (Sweden)	2–3 (0–2, 0–0, 2–1)	(Finland) Tappara	Coop Norrbotten Arena, Luleå; Attendance: 6,150

Game reference

Matteus Ward
Goalies
Christian Heljanko
Referees:
(Slovakia) Miroslav Štolc
(Germany) André Schrader
Linesmen:
(Switzerland) Eric Cattaneo
(Germany) Marius Wölzmüller

	0–1	01:42 – Tanus (Matushkin, Levtchi) (PP)
	0–2	07:06 – Ojamäki (Thomas, Ikonen)
	0–3	41:00 – Lehterä (Tanus, Savinainen)
Gustafsson (Fröberg, Connolly) (PP) – 52:04	1–3
Tyrväinen (Shinnimin, Connolly) – 57:50	2–3

10 min
Penalties
20 min
36
Shots
20

== Statistics ==
=== Scoring leaders ===
The following players are leading the league in points.

Player	Team	GP	G	A	PTS	PIM	+/–	GWG	PPG	SHG	SOG	S%
(United States) Ryan Lasch	(Sweden) Frölunda HC	11	7	15	22	4	+8	1	0	0	27	25.93%
(United States) Brian O'Neill	(Switzerland) EV Zug	12	6	11	17	8	+12	3	1	0	23	26.09%
(Finland) Juhani Tyrväinen	(Sweden) Luleå HF	11	5	9	14	+4	9	1	1	0	20	25.00%
(Finland) Niko Ojamäki	(Finland) Tappara	13	8	5	13	2	+10	2	3	0	35	22.86%
(Sweden) Rickard Hugg	(Sweden) Skellefteå AIK	9	7	5	12	2	+7	0	0	0	17	41.18%
(Sweden) Max Friberg	(Sweden) Frölunda HC	12	5	7	12	2	+3	1	3	1	30	16.67%
(Finland) Jori Lehterä	(Finland) Tappara	13	3	9	12	6	+5	2	0	1	20	15.00%
(Canada) Zach Boychuk	(Germany) Eisbären Berlin	6	8	3	11	6	+4	0	1	0	17	47.06%
(Switzerland) Enzo Corvi	(Switzerland) HC Davos	8	5	6	11	6	+5	1	0	1	14	35.71%
(Sweden) Max Lindholm	(Sweden) Skellefteå AIK	10	2	9	11	4	+1	0	1	0	17	11.76%

=== Leading goaltenders ===
The following goaltenders are leading the league in save percentage, provided that they have played at least 40% of their team's minutes.

Player	Team	GP	W	L	SV	GA	SV%	GAA	SO	MIN
(Canada) Connor Hughes	(Switzerland) HC Fribourg-Gottéron	6	2	2	115	4	96.64%	0.80	2	300
(Finland) Christian Heljanko	(Finland) Tappara	12	9	2	312	16	95.12%	1.33	4	724
(Germany) Dustin Strahlmeier	(Germany) Grizzlys Wolfsburg	5	2	3	165	11	93.75%	2.22	0	297
(Norway) Henrik Holm	(Norway) Stavanger Oilers	6	2	4	189	13	93.56%	2.14	1	364
(Sweden) Linus Söderström	(Sweden) Skellefteå AIK	4	3	1	105	8	92.92%	1.92	1	250

=== Home Game and Overall ===
As of 18 February 2023

Pos.	Team	Regular season		Playoffs		Overall			2021–22 average
Pos.	Team	Matches	Attendance	Matches	Attendance	Matches	Total	Average	2021–22 average
1	(Switzerland) HC Fribourg-Gottéron	3	14,842	1	4,321	4	19,163	4,791	3,458
2	(Finland) Tappara	3	13,266	3	15,217	6	24,483	4,747	1,297
3	(Finland) Ilves	3	13,802	0	–	3	13,802	4,601	–
4	(Switzerland) EV Zug	3	9,628	3	13,981	6	23,609	3,935	2,569
5	(Czech Republic) HC Sparta Praha	3	11,283	0	–	3	11,283	3,761	2,846
6	(Slovakia) Slovan Bratislava	3	11,169	0	—	3	11,169	3,723	1,932
7	(Switzerland) SC Rapperswil-Jona Lakers	3	11,049	0	–	3	11,049	3,683	–
8	(Germany) Straubing Tigers	3	9,965	1	4,480	4	14,445	3,611	–
9	(France) Brûleurs de Loups	3	10,680	0	–	3	10,680	3,560	–
10	(Sweden) Luleå HF	3	8,778	4	14,379	7	23,157	3,308	–
11	(Sweden) Rögle BK	3	9,378	2	6,711	5	16,089	3,218	2,483
12	(Northern Ireland) Belfast Giants	3	9,055	0	—	3	9,055	3,018	–
13	(Switzerland) HC Davos	3	10,576	1	1,389	4	11,965	2,991	–
14	(Czech Republic) Mountfield HK	3	7,894	2	6,123	5	14,017	2,803	–
15	(Sweden) Frölunda HC	3	7,019	3	8,896	6	15,915	2,653	1,715
16	(Hungary) Fehérvár AV19	3	7,920	0	–	3	7,920	2,640	–
17	(Germany) Eisbären Berlin	3	7,892	0	–	3	7,892	2,631	1,806
18	(Germany) Red Bull München	3	6,215	1	4,283	4	10,498	2,625	968
19	(Sweden) Skellefteå AIK	3	7,618	2	4,820	5	12,438	2,488	1,641
20	(Norway) Stavanger Oilers	3	7,199	0	—	3	7,199	2,400	–
21	(Finland) TPS	3	7,058	0	–	3	7,058	2,353	954
22	(Czech Republic) Oceláři Třinec	3	6,700	0	–	3	6,700	2,233	1,653
23	(Switzerland) ZSC Lions	3	4,140	1	4,015	4	8,155	2,039	2,282
24	(Sweden) Färjestad BK	3	6,104	1	1,637	4	7,741	1,935	–
25	(Austria) Villach SV	3	5,667	0	–	3	5,667	1,889	–
26	(Germany) Grizzlys Wolfsburg	3	5,356	1	1,812	4	7,168	1,792	–
27	(Slovenia) Olimpija Ljubljana	3	5,331	0	–	3	5,331	1,777	–
28	(Denmark) Aalborg Pirates	3	5,290	0	—	3	5,290	1,763	–
29	(Austria) Red Bull Salzburg	3	4,250	1	2,745	4	6,995	1,749	707
30	(Finland) Jukurit	3*	3,924	2	3,554	5	7,478	1,496	–
31	(Poland) GKS Katowice	3	3,933	0	—	3	3,933	1,311	–
32	(Poland) MKS Cracovia	3	3,800	0	—	3	3,800	1,267	–
Tournament total		96	256,781	29	98,363	125	355,144	2,841	1,879

Source: Champions Hockey League.

== Awards ==
=== MVP ===
The winner of the LGT MVP Award was announced on 18 February 2023.

Player	Team
(Finland) Christian Heljanko	(Finland) Tappara

=== Team of the Season ===
The Team of the Season was announced on 23 February 2023.

Position	Player	Team
Goaltender	(Finland) Christian Heljanko	(Finland) Tappara
Defenceman	(Finland) Julius Honka	(Sweden) Luleå HF
Defenceman	(Finland) Valtteri Kemiläinen	(Finland) Tappara
Forward	(United States) Brian O'Neill	(Switzerland) EV Zug
Forward	(Finland) Juhani Tyrväinen	(Finland) Tappara
Forward	(United States) Ryan Lasch	(Sweden) Frölunda HC
