= 2022–23 Liiga season =

Ice hockey season

2022–23 Liiga
- League: Liiga
- Sport: Ice hockey
- Defending champions: Tappara (2021–22)
- Duration: September 2022 – April 2023
- Number of games: 60
- Number of teams: 15
- TV partner(s): Telia; C More

Regular season
- Best record: Tappara
- Runners-up: Ilves
- Season MVP: Michael Joly (HPK)
- Top scorer: Michael Joly (HPK)

Playoffs
- Playoffs MVP: Veli-Matti Savinainen (Tappara)
- Finals champions: Tappara
- Runners-up: Pelicans

Liiga seasons
- ← 2021–22 2023–24 →

The 2022–23 Liiga season was the 48th season of the Liiga, the top level of ice hockey in Finland, since the league's formation in 1975.

== Teams ==
Location of teams in 2022–23 SM-liiga

| Team | City | Head coach | Arena | Capacity | Captain |
|---|---|---|---|---|---|
| HIFK | Helsinki | Ville Peltonen | Helsingin jäähalli | 8,200 | Teemu Tallberg |
| HPK | Hämeenlinna | Jarno Pikkarainen | Pohjantähti Areena | 5,360 | Juuso Hietanen |
| Ilves | Tampere | ~~Jouko Myrrä~~ 5 Oct 2022; Antti Pennanen | Nokia Arena | 13,000 | Eemeli Suomi |
| Jukurit | Mikkeli | Olli Jokinen | Ikioma Areena | 4,200 | Juhamatti Aaltonen |
| JYP | Jyväskylä | Jukka Rautakorpi | LähiTapiola Areena | 4,437 | Robert Rooba |
| KalPa | Kuopio | Tommi Miettinen | Olvi Areena | 5,300 | Tuomas Kiiskinen |
| KooKoo | Kouvola | Olli Salo | Lumon Areena | 5,950 | Heikki Liedes |
| Kärpät | Oulu | Lauri Marjamäki | Oulun Energia Areena | 6,400 | Atte Ohtamaa |
| Lukko | Rauma | Marko Virtanen | Kivikylän Areena | 4,700 | Anrei Hakulinen |
| Pelicans | Lahti | Tommi Niemelä | Isku Areena | 5,371 | Miika Roine |
| SaiPa | Lappeenranta | ~~Pekka Virta~~ 14 Oct 2022; Ville Hämäläinen | Lappeenrannan jäähalli | 4,820 | Jarno Koskiranta |
| Sport | Vaasa | Risto Dufva | Vaasan Sähkö Areena | 5,185 | Sebastian Stålberg |
| Tappara | Tampere | Jussi Tapola | Nokia Arena | 13,000 | Otto Rauhala |
| TPS | Turku | Jussi Ahokas | Gatorade Center | 11,820 | Juhani Jasu |
| Ässät | Pori | Karri Kivi | West Areena | 6,150 | Jesse Joensuu |

== Regular season ==
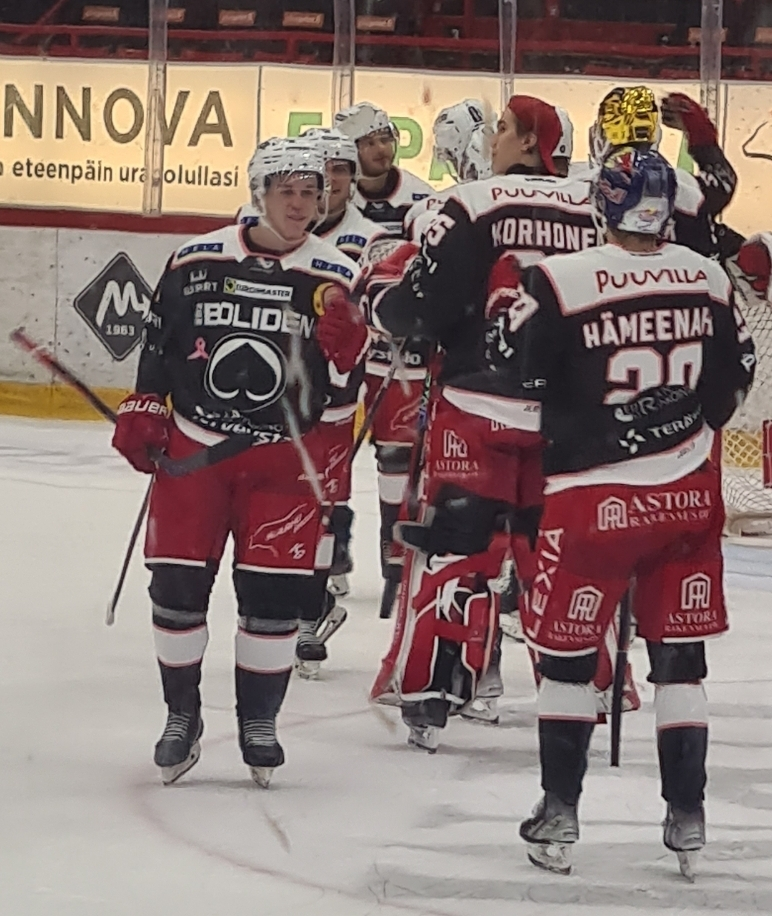
Ässät celebrating a regular season victory against Jukurit on 15 October 2022

Top six advanced straight to the quarter-finals, while teams between 7th and 10th positions played a wild card round for the final two spots. The SM-liiga is a closed series and thus there is no relegation.

| Pos | Team | Pld | W | OTW | OTL | L | GF | GA | GD | Pts | Final Result |
|---|---|---|---|---|---|---|---|---|---|---|---|
| 1 | Tappara | 60 | 33 | 6 | 5 | 16 | 187 | 140 | +47 | 116 | Advance to Quarterfinals |
| 2 | Ilves | 60 | 32 | 7 | 4 | 17 | 185 | 126 | +59 | 114 | Advance to Quarterfinals |
| 3 | Lukko | 60 | 28 | 8 | 5 | 19 | 155 | 122 | +33 | 105 | Advance to Quarterfinals |
| 4 | Pelicans | 60 | 30 | 4 | 5 | 21 | 166 | 136 | +30 | 103 | Advance to Quarterfinals |
| 5 | KalPa | 60 | 28 | 5 | 8 | 19 | 169 | 145 | +24 | 102 | Advance to Quarterfinals |
| 6 | HIFK | 60 | 24 | 8 | 9 | 19 | 155 | 150 | +5 | 97 | Advance to Quarterfinals |
| 7 | Kärpät | 60 | 24 | 7 | 10 | 19 | 158 | 143 | +15 | 96 | Advance to Wild-card round |
| 8 | Ässät | 60 | 25 | 5 | 6 | 24 | 129 | 150 | −21 | 91 | Advance to Wild-card round |
| 9 | TPS | 60 | 21 | 10 | 8 | 21 | 141 | 140 | +1 | 91 | Advance to Wild-card round |
| 10 | KooKoo | 60 | 19 | 11 | 5 | 25 | 155 | 167 | −12 | 84 | Advance to Wild-card round |
| 11 | Jukurit | 60 | 24 | 5 | 1 | 30 | 155 | 165 | −10 | 83 | |
| 12 | HPK | 60 | 17 | 9 | 14 | 20 | 153 | 162 | −9 | 83 | |
| 13 | JYP | 60 | 17 | 9 | 5 | 29 | 159 | 172 | −13 | 74 | |
| 14 | Sport | 60 | 16 | 3 | 9 | 32 | 126 | 177 | −51 | 63 | |
| 15 | SaiPa | 60 | 8 | 7 | 10 | 35 | 124 | 222 | −98 | 48 | |

Source: Liiga

=== Scoring leaders ===
The following players led the league in regular season points.

| Player | Team | GP | G | A | Pts | +/– | PIM |
|---|---|---|---|---|---|---|---|
| Michael Joly | HPK | 60 | 25 | 39 | 64 | +9 | 18 |
| Jori Lehterä | Tappara | 57 | 11 | 46 | 57 | +5 | 45 |
| Jerry Turkulainen | JYP | 60 | 12 | 42 | 54 | –3 | 20 |
| Petri Kontiola | Ilves | 58 | 12 | 39 | 51 | 0 | 40 |
| Jaakko Rissanen | KalPa | 57 | 16 | 34 | 50 | +17 | 26 |
| Henrik Haapala | Ilves | 47 | 15 | 32 | 47 | +9 | 20 |
| Les Lancaster | Ilves | 60 | 13 | 34 | 47 | +20 | 22 |
| Joona Ikonen | Ilves | 54 | 23 | 22 | 45 | +9 | 16 |
| Veli-Matti Savinainen | Tappara | 54 | 17 | 27 | 44 | +6 | 30 |
| Thomas Gregoire | Lukko | 57 | 13 | 31 | 44 | +23 | 41 |

== Playoffs ==
=== Bracket ===
Wild-card round (best-of-3)
7 | Kärpät | 1
10 | KooKoo | 2
8 | Ässät | 2
9 | TPS | 1

Quarter-finals (best-of-7)
1 | Tappara | 4
10 | KooKoo | 0
2 | Ilves | 4
8 | Ässät | 1
3 | Lukko | 2
6 | HIFK | 4
4 | Pelicans | 4
5 | KalPa | 3

Semi-finals (best-of-7)
1 | Tappara | 4
6 | HIFK | 1
(Pairings are re-seeded after the first and second round)
2 | Ilves | 2
4 | Pelicans | 4

Finals (best-of-7)
1 | Tappara | 4
4 | Pelicans | 1
Bronze medal game
2 | Ilves | 1
6 | HIFK | 0

=== Wild-card round ===
Kärpät – KooKoo 1-2
| 13.3.2023 | Kärpät | KooKoo | 4-2 ref |
| 14.3.2023 | KooKoo | Kärpät | 4-1 ref |
| 16.3.2023 | Kärpät | KooKoo | 0-5 ref |
KooKoo wins the series 2-1.

Ässät – TPS 2-1
| 13.3.2023 | Ässät | TPS | 2-1 ref |
| 14.3.2023 | TPS | Ässät | 2-1 ref |
| 16.3.2023 | Ässät | TPS | 2-1 ref |
Ässät wins the series 2-1.

=== Quarter-finals ===
Tappara – KooKoo 4-0
| 17.3.2023 | Tappara | KooKoo | 4-0 ref |
| 20.3.2023 | KooKoo | Tappara | 1-6 ref |
| 21.3.2023 | Tappara | KooKoo | 2-1 OT1 ref |
| 24.3.2023 | KooKoo | Tappara | 0-3 ref |
Tappara wins the series 4-0.

Lukko – HIFK 2-4
| 18.3.2023 | Lukko | HIFK | 1-4 ref |
| 20.3.2023 | HIFK | Lukko | 1-0 OT1 ref |
| 22.3.2023 | Lukko | HIFK | 3-5 ref |
| 24.3.2023 | HIFK | Lukko | 1-2 OT1 ref |
| 25.3.2023 | Lukko | HIFK | 2-1 ref |
| 27.3.2023 | HIFK | Lukko | 3-2 OT1 ref |
HIFK wins the series 4-2.

Ilves – Ässät 4-1
| 18.3.2023 | Ilves | Ässät | 5-1 ref |
| 20.3.2023 | Ässät | Ilves | 5-2 ref |
| 22.3.2023 | Ilves | Ässät | 4-1 ref |
| 24.3.2023 | Ässät | Ilves | 1-4 ref |
| 26.3.2023 | Ilves | Ässät | 3-2 ref |
Ilves wins the series 4-1.

Pelicans – KalPa 4-3
| 17.3.2023 | Pelicans | KalPa | 2-1 ref |
| 18.3.2023 | KalPa | Pelicans | 3-0 ref |
| 20.3.2023 | Pelicans | KalPa | 2-1 ref |
| 22.3.2023 | KalPa | Pelicans | 3-2 ref |
| 24.3.2023 | Pelicans | KalPa | 3-1 ref |
| 25.3.2023 | KalPa | Pelicans | 5-1 ref |
| 28.3.2023 | Pelicans | KalPa | 4-2 ref |
Pelicans wins the series 4-3.

=== Semi-finals ===
Tappara – HIFK 4-1
| 31.3.2023 | HIFK | Tappara | 2-3 OT2 ref |
| 1.4.2023 | HIFK | Tappara | 4-2 ref |
| 5.4.2023 | Tappara | HIFK | 5-2 ref |
| 7.4.2023 | Tappara | HIFK | 5-2 ref |
| 10.4.2023 | Tappara | HIFK | 2-1 ref |
Tappara wins the series 4-1.

Ilves – Pelicans 2-4
| 31.3.2023 | Pelicans | Ilves | 2-3 OT1 ref |
| 1.4.2023 | Pelicans | Ilves | 3-2 ref |
| 6.4.2023 | Ilves | Pelicans | 2-3 ref |
| 8.4.2023 | Ilves | Pelicans | 3-2 ref |
| 11.4.2023 | Ilves | Pelicans | 0-2 ref |
| 13.4.2023 | Pelicans | Ilves | 3-1 ref |
Pelicans wins the series 4-2.

=== Bronze medal game ===
| 20 April 2023; 18:30 | Ilves | 3–2 (1–1, 1–0, 1–1) | HIFK | Nokia Arena, Tampere; Attendance: 8,044 |

Game reference

Marek Langhamer
Goalies
Roope Taponen
Referees:
Jukka-Pekka Koistinen
Mikko Kaukokari
Linesmen:
Jussi Thomann
Juho-Pekka Inkinen

| | 0–1 | 06:05 – Pakarinen (Jääskä, Luhanka) |
| Mäntykivi (Tikka) – 12:07 | 1–1 |
| Tikka (Mäntykivi, Nyman) – 26:39 | 2–1 |
| | 2–2 | 41:26 – Teissala (Melart, Rantakari) |
| Virtanen (Koskiranta) – 48:23 | 3–2 |

14 min
Penalties
10 min
24
Shots
25

=== Finals ===
| 19 April 2023; 18:30 | Tappara | 5–1 (1–0, 3–1, 1–0) | Pelicans | Nokia Arena, Tampere; Attendance: 11,904 |

Game reference

Christian Heljanko
Goalies
Patrik Bartošák
Jasper Patrikainen
Referees:
Mikko Kaukokari
Lassi Heikkinen
Linesmen:
Hannu Sormunen
Onni Hautamäki

| Tanus (Savinainen, Seppälä) – 07:29 | 1–0 |
| | 1–1 | 21:46 – Vilén (Killinen, Kangasniemi) |
| Savinainen (Kemiläinen) (PP) – 36:55 | 2–1 |
| Vittasmäki (Levtchi, Tuulola) – 39:14 | 3–1 |
| M. Davidsson (Jürgens, Ojamäki) – 39:45 | 4–1 |
| Rauhala (Puhakka, Merelä) – 40:55 | 5–1 |

4 min
Penalties
6 min
24
Shots
19

| 21 April 2023; 18:30 | Pelicans | 0–2 (0–1, 0–0, 0–1) | Tappara | Isku Areena, Lahti; Attendance: 4,403 |

Game reference
| Patrik Bartošák | Goalies | Christian Heljanko | Referees: Antti Boman; Joonas Kova; Linesmen: Tommi Niittylä; Joni Pekkala |
| 0–1 / 01:04 – Rauhala (Matushkin, Seppälä); 0–2 / 59:04 – Merelä (Lehterä, Savinainen) (EN) | | | Referees: Antti Boman; Joonas Kova; Linesmen: Tommi Niittylä; Joni Pekkala |
| 2 min | Penalties | 31 min | Referees: Antti Boman; Joonas Kova; Linesmen: Tommi Niittylä; Joni Pekkala |
| 47 | Shots | 48 | Referees: Antti Boman; Joonas Kova; Linesmen: Tommi Niittylä; Joni Pekkala |

| 22 April 2023; 17:00 | Tappara | 1–4 (0–1, 0–1, 1–2) | Pelicans | Nokia Arena, Tampere; Attendance: 12,354 |

Game reference

Christian Heljanko
Goalies
Patrik Bartošák
Referees:
Joonas Kova
Mikko Kaukokari
Linesmen:
Hannu Sormunen
Onni Hautamäki

| | 0–1 | 19:36 – Utunen (Kangasniemi, Ikonen) |
| | 0–2 | 33:08 – Hirvonen (Jämsen, Utunen) |
| Savinainen (Tanus) – 47:22 | 1–2 |
| | 1–3 | 58:24 – Kangasniemi (Killinen) |
| | 1–4 | 59:27 – Jasek (Bryggman) (EN) |

10 min
Penalties
6 min
51
Shots
37

| 25 April 2023; 18:30 | Pelicans | 1–3 (0–1, 0–1, 1–1) | Tappara | Isku Areena, Lahti; Attendance: 4,403 |

Game reference

Patrik Bartošák
Goalies
Christian Heljanko
Referees:
Antti Boman
Jukka-Pekka Koistinen
Linesmen:
Tommi Niittylä
Joni Pekkala

| | 0–1 | 05:04 – Thomas (Tuulola, Granath) |
| Kelleher (Vilén, Mylläri) – 58:43 | 1–1 |
| | 1–2 | 29:29 – Savinainen (Lehterä, Ojamäki) (PP) |
| | 1–3 | 44:29 – Merelä (Puhakka, Matushkin) |

4 min
Penalties
6 min
39
Shots
43

| 27 April 2023; 18:30 | Tappara | 5–4 OT1 (3–2, 0–1, 1–1, 1–0) | Pelicans | Nokia Arena, Tampere; Attendance: 12,700 |

Game reference

Christian Heljanko
Goalies
Patrik Bartošák
Jasper Patrikainen
Referees:
Mikko Kaukokari
Lassi Heikkinen
Linesmen:
Hannu Sormunen
Onni Hautamäki

| Levtchi (Merelä, Matushkin) – 01:11 | 1–0 |
| Tanus (Lehterä, Matushkin) – 07:03 | 2–0 |
| Jurgens (Merelä, Levtchi) – 07:29 | 3–0 |
| | 3–1 | 12:04 – Vilen (Ikonen, Vilen) (PP1) |
| | 3–2 | 14:41 – Blood (Vilen) |
| | 3–3 | 39:01 – Kangasniemi (Roine, Jašek) (PP1) |
| | 3–4 | 44:14 – Jämsen (Hirvonen, Vilen) |
| Savinainen (Kemiläinen, Merelä) – 59:59 | 4–4 |
| Davidsson (Jurgens, Puhakka) – 68:57 | 5–4 |

8 min
Penalties
10 min
43
Shots
21

Tappara wins the finals 4-1.

== Final rankings ==
| Gold medal | Tappara |
| Silver medal | Pelicans |
| Bronze medal | Ilves |
| 4 | HIFK |
| 5 | Lukko |
| 6 | KalPa |
| 7 | Ässät |
| 8 | KooKoo |
| 9 | Kärpät |
| 10 | TPS |
| 11 | Jukurit |
| 12 | HPK |
| 13 | JYP |
| 14 | Sport |
| 15 | SaiPa |

== See also ==
- 2022–23 Naisten Liiga season
