= Max Friberg =

Swedish ice hockey player (born 1992)

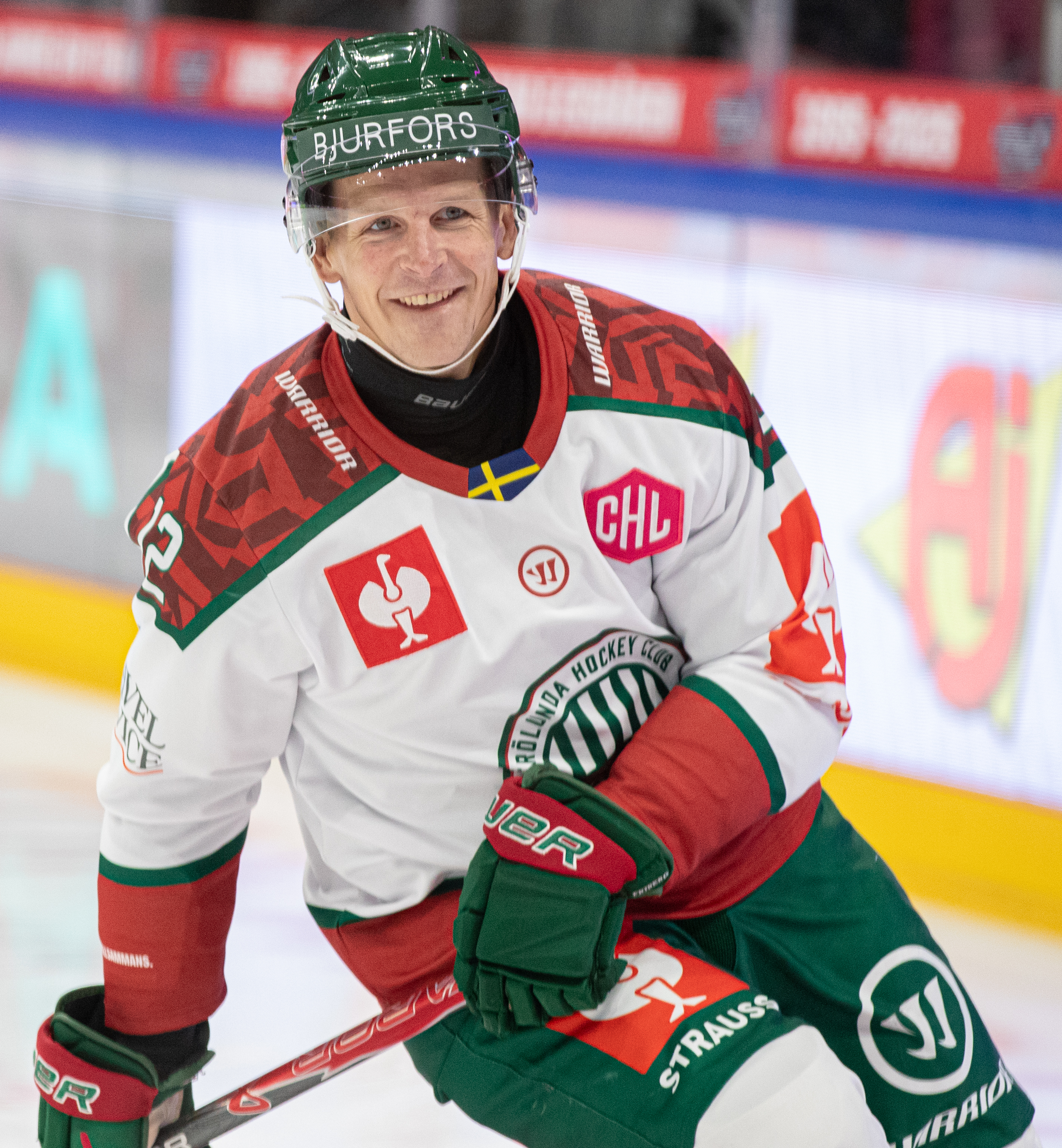
- Friberg in 2025
- Born: 20 November 1992 (age 33) Skövde, Sweden
- Height: 180 cm (5 ft 11 in)
- Weight: 89 kg (196 lb; 14 st 0 lb)
- Position: Left wing
- Shoots: Right
- SHL team Former teams: Frölunda HC; Timrå IK; Anaheim Ducks
- National team: Sweden
- NHL draft: 143rd overall, 2011; Anaheim Ducks
- Playing career: 2009–present

Max Friberg (born 20 November 1992) is a Swedish professional ice hockey winger who is currently playing—and serving as captain—for Frölunda HC of the Swedish Hockey League (SHL). He won a gold medal at the 2012 World Junior Ice Hockey Championships for team Sweden, the Swedish Championship in 2019 with Frölunda, and the Champions Hockey League twice; in 2019 and 2020 with Frölunda.

He was selected in the fifth round, 143rd overall, by the Anaheim Ducks of the National Hockey League (NHL) in the 2011 NHL entry draft.

== Playing career ==
=== Skövde ===
Friberg grew up playing for his hometown team Skövde IK. During the 2007–08 season he played 24 games in the J18 Elit, scoring six goals and three assists. He also played 12 games in the J20 Elit, scoring one goal and two assists. The following season Skövde were relegated to the J18 Div.1, Sweden's third tier under 18 league, Friberg played ten games with the under 18 team, scoring 14 goals and 18 assist for a total of 32 points. He played 17 games with the under 20 team in the J20 Elit, scoring 13 goals and seven assists. During the season he made his senior debut with Skövde's men's team in Division 1, Sweden's third tier men's league, playing 24 games he scored one goal and three assists.

For the 2009–10 Friberg had had a breakout season with the men's team, in 36 games he scored 12 goals and 18 assists for a total of 30 points, which was the highest point total of any under 18 player in the league. Skövde's under 18 team were promoted back to the J18 Elit where Friberg played five games, scoring five goals and six assists. He only played one game with the under 20 team in the J20 Elit, recording three assists.

During the 2010–11 season Friberg played 34 games with the men's team in Division 1, scoring 13 goals and 27 assists for a total of 40 points, which was the highest point total for any 18 year old player in the league. He also played two games with the under 20 team in the J20 Elit, scoring one goal and three assists. His stellar point production in Division 1 had not gone unnoticed—despite it not being the usual path for prospects in Sweden to go, instead most opting to play with bigger clubs in the top tier J20 SuperElit at the time—Friberg was selected 143rd overall by the Anaheim Ducks in the 2011 NHL entry draft, as only the second player ever drafted from Skövde IK after Anton Strålman who was selected at the 2005 NHL entry draft.

=== Timrå ===
After having graduated gymnasium and to continue his development and play at a higher level, Friberg signed a two-year contract with Timrå IK of the Elitserien, Sweden's top tier men's league, for the 2011–12 season. He scored his first goal in the league on 19 November 2011, against Fredrik Norrena of Linköpings HC as Timrå won 4–1. In total he played 48 games, scoring five goals and five assists, which ranked as the sixth highest point total for players under the age of 20 in the league. Timrå finished 12th, dead last in the league with only 52 points, and had to play in the 2012 Kvalserien—a promotion and relegation series to defend their spot in Elitserien. Friberg played an instrumental role for Timrå in Kvalserien, scoring the overtime game winning goal in game one against BIK Karlskoga which ended 5–4, and both goals in a 2–1 overtime win against Rögle BK in game seven which basically secured their Elitserien status for the next season. Timrå won the series, in the ten games Friberg scored three goals and four assists, which ranked fourth overall in points for Timrå. During the season he also played two games with Timrå's under 20 team in the J20 SuperElit, scoring two goals and two assists, as well as being loaned to IF Sundsvall Hockey in the second tier HockeyAllsvenskan for one game, without registering any points.

On 15 June 2012, Friberg agreed to a three-year, entry-level contract with the Anaheim Ducks. He was loaned back to Timrå for the 2012–13 season, he played 55 games, scoring eight goals and eight assists as Timrå finished 11th in the league with 57 points, and had to play in the 2013 Kvalserien. Friberg scored four goals and two assist in ten games as Timrå finished third in Kvalserien and were thus relegated to HockeyAllsvenskan for the following season.

=== North America ===
After finishing the season with Timrå Friberg was assigned by the Ducks to their American Hockey League (AHL) affiliate the Norfolk Admirals for the end of the 2012–13 AHL season. He scored his first goal in his third AHL game on 14 April, the only goal for Norfolk in a 1–4 loss against the Providence Bruins. The following day after the game against Providence he and some of his teammates were sightseeing in Boston and had just gotten out off the train station as they heard the explosions of the Boston Marathon bombing. In total he played six games, scoring one goal, as Norfolk finished ninth in the eastern conference and missed the playoffs by two points.

For the 2013–14 season Friberg played 74 games, scoring 17 goals and 23 assists for a total of 40 points. Norfolk finished eight in the eastern conference and clinched the last playoff spot in the 2014 Calder Cup playoffs. Norfolk won the best of five conference quarterfinals against the Manchester Monarchs three games to one, but lost the conference semifinals two games to four against the St. John's IceCaps. In ten games of the playoffs Friberg scored three goals and two assists.

After having played two pre-season games with the Ducks, and being the last forward cut from the Ducks' NHL roster Friberg had a rough start with Norfolk to the 2014–15 season, injuring his elbow 45 seconds into the first game on 19 October. He made his NHL debut on 28 December 2014, in a 2–1 overtime win against the Vancouver Canucks. Which was his only appearance with the Ducks for the season, spending the rest of it in Norfolk totaling 58 games, scoring 15 goals and 25 assist for a total of 40 points.

Friberg signed a two-year contract extension with Anaheim prior to the 2015–16 season, their AHL affiliate the Norfolk Admirals had moved to San Diego, California to become the newest version of the San Diego Gulls, as part of the AHL's efforts to create a Pacific Division. Friberg once again did not meet the cut for the Ducks' NHL roster to start the season and was placed on waivers to be assigned to San Diego, where Friberg was named alternate captain of the Gulls. During the autumn Friberg was called up to Anaheim for five games, but he spent the majority of time with San Diego in the AHL wher he scored five goals and twelve assists for a total of 17 points before being traded on 7 January 2016, by the Ducks to the Montreal Canadiens in exchange for Dustin Tokarski. Friberg was assigned directly to conclude the remainder of the season with Montreal's AHL affiliate, the St. John's IceCaps. Where he played 42 games, scoring seven goals and twelve assist.

In the 2016–17 season, Friberg was assigned to continue with the IceCaps for the entirety of the campaign. As the IceCaps captain in their announced last season in the AHL, Friberg contributed 11 goals and 31 points in 71 games.

=== Frölunda ===
As an impending restricted free agent from the Canadiens, having never made his NHL debut with the club, Friberg opted to return home to Sweden in agreeing to a three-year contract with Frölunda HC of the SHL on 4 May 2017. Scoring four goals and 13 assists in 52 games regular season games, and two goals in six playoff games as Frölunda were eliminated two games to four against Malmö Redhawks in the quarterfinals. During the season Friberg also appeared for Frölunda in eight games of the 2017–18 Champions Hockey League, recording four assists, Frölunda failed to advanced past the round of 16 after having lost the best of two playoff round against HC Bílí Tygři Liberec 7–8 on aggregate score.

Early in the 2018–19 SHL season Friberg had to leave a game after being cut in the face by Luleå HF's defenceman Oscar Engsund's skate blade. The cut caused significant bleeding but required only seven stitches, Friberg was back in practice the following day. Frölunda competed in the 2018–19 Champions Hockey League and Friberg scored four goals and four assists in 13 games, as Frölunda won the championship by defeating EHC Red Bull München 3–1 in the final. Friberg played all 52 regular season games in the SHL, scoring seven goals and 15 assists. In the playoffs Frölunda again faced Malmö Redhawks in the quarterfinals but this time defeated them 4–1 in the best of seven series, in the semifinals Frölunda faced Luleå HF who they also won against 4–1 in games. In the finals Frölunda faced Djurgårdens IF, winning the best of seven series 4–2 and thus becoming Swedish Champions. Friberg played in all 16 games was a crucial part in the team’s success in the playoffs, scoring the championship clinching goal and becoming the total leader in goals with eight, and with eight assists for a total of 16 points the third overall in points of all players. Friberg signed a three-year contract extension with Frölunda following his strong postseason performance.

The following season Frölunda successfully defended their Champions Hockey League title, defeating Czech team Mountfield HK 3–1 in the final. Friberg scored three goals and six assists in twelve games of the tournament. In the SHL Friberg scored eight goals and twelve assist in 50 regular season games as Frölunda finished seventh in the league standings, and were thus qualified for the eighth-finals in the playoffs. The SHL playoffs were initially postponed due to the COVID-19 pandemic, but were eventually canceled altogether.

The SHL resumed play for the 2020–21 season, but the Champions Hockey League was canceled due to the pandemic. In SHL play, Friberg scored 13 goals and 16 assists for 29 points in 52 regular season games, being tied first in the league with four of his 13 goals having been scored short-handed. In the playoffs Frölunda beat Djurgårdens IF 2–1 in games of the best of three eight-finals, but lost in four straight games to Rögle BK in the best of seven quarterfinals. In the seven playoff games Friberg scored no goals but recorded five assists.

As still reigning champion of the Champions Hockey League Frölunda were qualified for the 2021–22 season. Friberg scored one goal and six assists in ten games of the tournament as Frölunda were eliminated in the semifinals against Rögle BK whom went on to become new champions of the tournament. In the 2021–22 SHL season, during a game against Malmö Redhawks on 4 November 2021, late in the first period Friberg got cut by Malmö's Markus Lauridsen's skate blade in his right leg quadriceps and suffered massive hemorrhage on the ice. Malmö's defensive pairing of brothers Markus and Oliver Lauridsen quickly realised the seriousness of the situation and rushed to help Friberg of the ice. The period was cut short due to the injury and the game wasn't resumed until the medical team reported that they managed to stop the bleeding and he was taken by ambulance to Sahlgrenska University Hospital, where he was operated during the night. Despite the severity of the injury, Friberg made a remarkably quick recovery and returned to play less than a month later, making his comeback on 2 December in a game against Luleå HF. He scored in the shootout, though Frölunda lost the game 2–3. In total he appeared in 41 regular season games, scoring twelve goals and ten assist for a total of 22 points as Frölunda finished fourth in the league standings. In the playoffs Friberg had no goals but contributed six assists, as the team swept Växjö Lakers 4–0 in the quarterfinals, but lost one game to four against Luleå HF in the semifinals.

During the 2022–23 Champions Hockey League Friberg scored five goals and seven assist for a total of twelve points in twelve games, as Frölunda reached the semifinals where they were eliminated against Luleå HF. In the SHL Friberg scored twelve goals and ten assist for a total of 22 points in 35 games before suffering an injury to his hand in which he broke his finger on 20 January 2023, which resulted in a surgery which kept him out for the remainder of the regular season. He returned for the playoffs, in total Friberg appeared in 13 playoff games, scoring one goal and two assist as Frölunda were eliminated against Växjö two games to four in the best of seven semifinal series. After the season ended longtime Frölunda captain Joel Lundqvist announced his retirement and despite Friberg not having been and alternate captain during his tenure with Frölunda he was announced on 22 June 2023 as their new captain starting the 2023–24 season. Friberg had his most productive season to date in his new role, scoring 16 goals and 27 assist for a total of 43 points in 51 games. He was named to the Sweden All-Star Team SHL for his performance during the season. In the playoffs he scored four goals and four assist for a total of eight points in 14 games, as Frölunda were eliminated in the decisive game seven of the semifinal series against Skellefteå AIK. During the season Frölunda also appeared in the 2023 Spengler Cup, where Friberg scored one goal in four games as Frölunda were eliminated in overtime of the semifinal against HC Davos who went on the win tournament.

During the 2024–25 season, Friberg appeared in 51 regular season games, recording 13 goals and 21 assists for 34 points. In the playoffs, he played twelve games and scored four goals and six assists for ten points, as Frölunda advanced to the semifinals but were eliminated 2–4 in a best-of-seven series against Luleå HF.

== International play ==
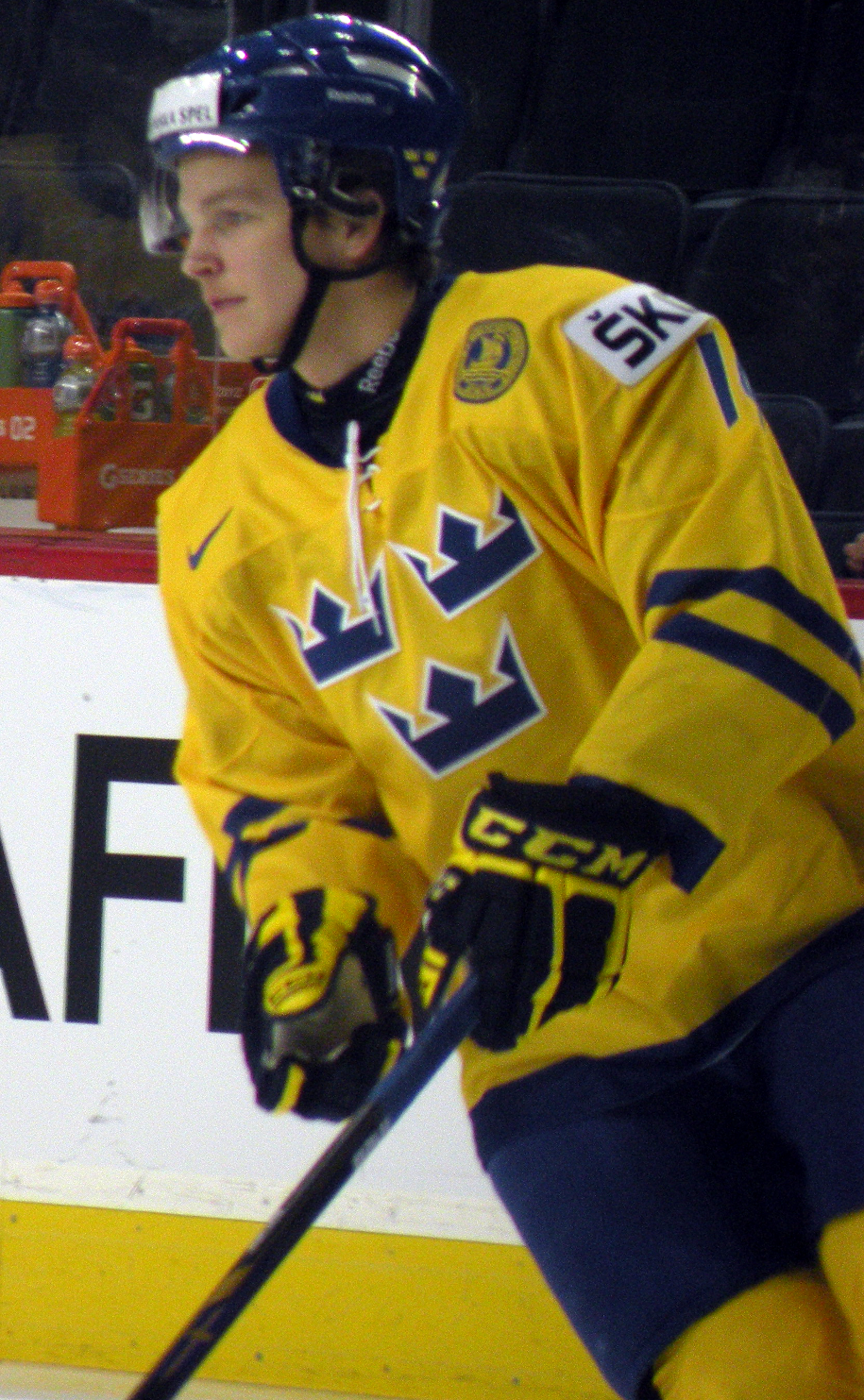

Medal record

Representing Sweden

Ice hockey

World Championships
Bronze medal – third place	2024 Czech Republic	
Bronze medal – third place	2025 Sweden/Denmark	

World Junior Championships
Gold medal – first place	2012 Canada	

World U18 Championships
Silver medal – second place	2010 Belarus	

Friberg made his international debut with the Swedish national under-18 team during the 2009–10 season, scoring four goals and one assist in nine exhibition games. His performance earned him a spot on the roster for the 2010 IIHF World U18 Championships, where he recorded two goals and three assists in six games. Sweden advanced to the final but lost 1–3 to the United States, earning the silver medal.

The following season, Friberg continued to represent Sweden at the junior level, playing for the Swedish national under-19 team, where he tallied three goals and seven assists for ten points in seven games. He joined the Swedish national under-20 team, participating in several international junior tournaments. At the 2011 World Junior Ice Hockey Championships, Friberg recorded two goals in six games, as Sweden finished fourth after a 2–4 loss to the United States in the bronze medal game. In total with the under-20 team, Friberg appeared in 14 games, registering four goals and three assists for seven points.

At the 2012 World Junior Ice Hockey Championships, Friberg scored a tournament-high four goals in Sweden's opening game, a 9–4 victory over Latvia. On 31 December, in a group stage matchup against Russia, he tied the game with just 40 seconds remaining in the third period and assisted on the overtime winner. In the semifinal against Finland, Friberg scored the deciding goal in the shootout, sending Sweden to the final with a 2–1 win. Sweden went on to win the gold medal with a 1–0 overtime victory over Russia, securing their first World Junior Championship title in 31 years and their second overall. Friberg finished the tournament as Sweden’s top scorer with nine goals and two assists in six games. His nine goals were the most by any player in the tournament, and his eleven points ranked second overall behind Russia’s Evgeny Kuznetsov, who had 13. He was named to the tournament All-Star Team and was selected as one of Sweden’s top three players of the tournament by the coaching staff. Across all international games with the U20 team that season, Friberg recorded 15 goals and eleven assists for a total of 26 points in 16 games.

Friberg made his senior debut internationally with Sweden men's national ice hockey team during the Karjala Tournament of the 2019–20 Euro Hockey Tour, he registered one assist in three games. The following he season, he became a regular in the national team lineup, scoring five goals and three assists in 13 games of the Euro Hockey Tour. His strong performance earned him a spot on Sweden's roster for the 2021 IIHF World Championship, where he played in seven games and registered two assists. Sweden finished fifth in their group and, for the first time since 1985, failed to advance to the quarterfinals.

The following season, Friberg represented Sweden at the 2022 Winter Olympics in Beijing. Sweden lost a tight semifinal match against the Russian Olympic Committee in a shootout and were then defeated 0–4 by Slovakia in the bronze medal game, finishing fourth overall. Friberg recorded one goal and one assist in six games during the tournament. He also took part in the 2022 IIHF World Championship later that spring, scoring two goals during the group stage and adding one goal in the quarterfinal matchup against Canada. Sweden were eliminated after a 3–4 overtime loss in that game.

Friberg represented Sweden at the 2024 IIHF World Championship, where the team won the bronze medal. He appeared in three games without recording any points. The following year, he again represented Sweden as they capture bronze at the 2025 IIHF World Championship, appearing in two games without registering a point.

== Career statistics ==
=== Regular season and playoffs ===
			Regular season					Playoffs
Season	Team	League	GP	G	A	Pts	PIM	GP	G	A	Pts	PIM
2007–08	Skövde IK	J18	24	6	3	9	44	—	—	—	—	—
2007–08	Skövde IK	SWE.2 U20	12	1	2	3	0	—	—	—	—	—
2008–09	Skövde IK	SWE.2 U18	10	14	18	32	4	—	—	—	—	—
2008–09	Skövde IK	SWE.2 U20	17	13	7	20	18	—	—	—	—	—
2008–09	Skövde IK	Div.1	24	1	3	4	2	—	—	—	—	—
2009–10	Skövde IK	J18	5	5	6	11	2	—	—	—	—	—
2009–10	Skövde IK	SWE.2 U20	1	0	3	3	0	—	—	—	—	—
2009–10	Skövde IK	Div.1	36	12	18	30	22	—	—	—	—	—
2010–11	Skövde IK	SWE.2 U20	2	1	3	4	2	—	—	—	—	—
2010–11	Skövde IK	Div.1	34	13	27	40	6	—	—	—	—	—
2011–12	Timrå IK	J20	2	2	2	4	0	—	—	—	—	—
2011–12	Timrå IK	SEL	48	5	5	10	8	10	3	4	7	4
2011–12	IF Sundsvall Hockey	Allsv	1	0	0	0	0	—	—	—	—	—
2012–13	Timrå IK	SEL	55	8	8	16	12	10	4	2	6	0
2012–13	Norfolk Admirals	AHL	6	1	0	1	0	—	—	—	—	—
2013–14	Norfolk Admirals	AHL	74	17	23	40	55	10	3	2	5	2
2014–15	Norfolk Admirals	AHL	58	15	25	40	46	—	—	—	—	—
2014–15	Anaheim Ducks	NHL	1	0	0	0	0	—	—	—	—	—
2015–16	San Diego Gulls	AHL	25	5	12	17	2	—	—	—	—	—
2015–16	Anaheim Ducks	NHL	5	0	0	0	2	—	—	—	—	—
2015–16	St. John's IceCaps	AHL	42	7	12	19	12	—	—	—	—	—
2016–17	St. John's IceCaps	AHL	71	11	20	31	18	4	0	3	3	2
2017–18	Frölunda HC	SHL	52	4	13	17	20	6	2	0	2	0
2018–19	Frölunda HC	SHL	52	7	15	22	14	16	8	8	16	8
2019–20	Frölunda HC	SHL	50	8	12	20	20	—	—	—	—	—
2020–21	Frölunda HC	SHL	52	13	16	29	18	7	0	5	5	0
2021–22	Frölunda HC	SHL	41	12	10	22	10	9	0	6	6	0
2022–23	Frölunda HC	SHL	35	12	10	22	10	13	1	2	3	2
2023–24	Frölunda HC	SHL	51	16	27	43	4	14	4	4	8	4
2024–25	Frölunda HC	SHL	51	13	21	34	32	12	4	6	10	4
2025–26	Frölunda HC	SHL	52	5	14	19	10	6	2	1	3	2
SHL totals			539	103	151	254	158	103	28	38	66	24
NHL totals			6	0	0	0	2	—	—	—	—	—

=== International ===
Year	Team	Event	Result	GP	G	A	Pts	PIM
2010	Sweden	U18	2nd place, silver medalist(s)	6	2	3	5	14
2011	Sweden	WJC	4th	6	2	0	2	4
2012	Sweden	WJC	1st place, gold medalist(s)	6	9	2	11	22
2021	Sweden	WC	9th	7	0	2	2	0
2022	Sweden	OG	4th	6	1	1	2	0
2022	Sweden	WC	6th	8	3	0	3	0
2024	Sweden	WC	3rd place, bronze medalist(s)	3	0	0	0	0
2025	Sweden	WC	3rd place, bronze medalist(s)	2	0	0	0	0
Junior totals				18	13	5	18	40
Senior totals				26	4	3	7	0

== Awards and honours ==
Award	Year
CHL
Champions (Frölunda HC)	2019, 2020, 2026
SHL
Le Mat Trophy (Frölunda HC)	2019
International
WJC First Team All-Star	2012

Preceded by Joel Lundqvist	Frölunda HC captain 2023–	Succeeded by TBD
