= Veli-Matti Savinainen =

Finnish ice hockey player (born 1986)

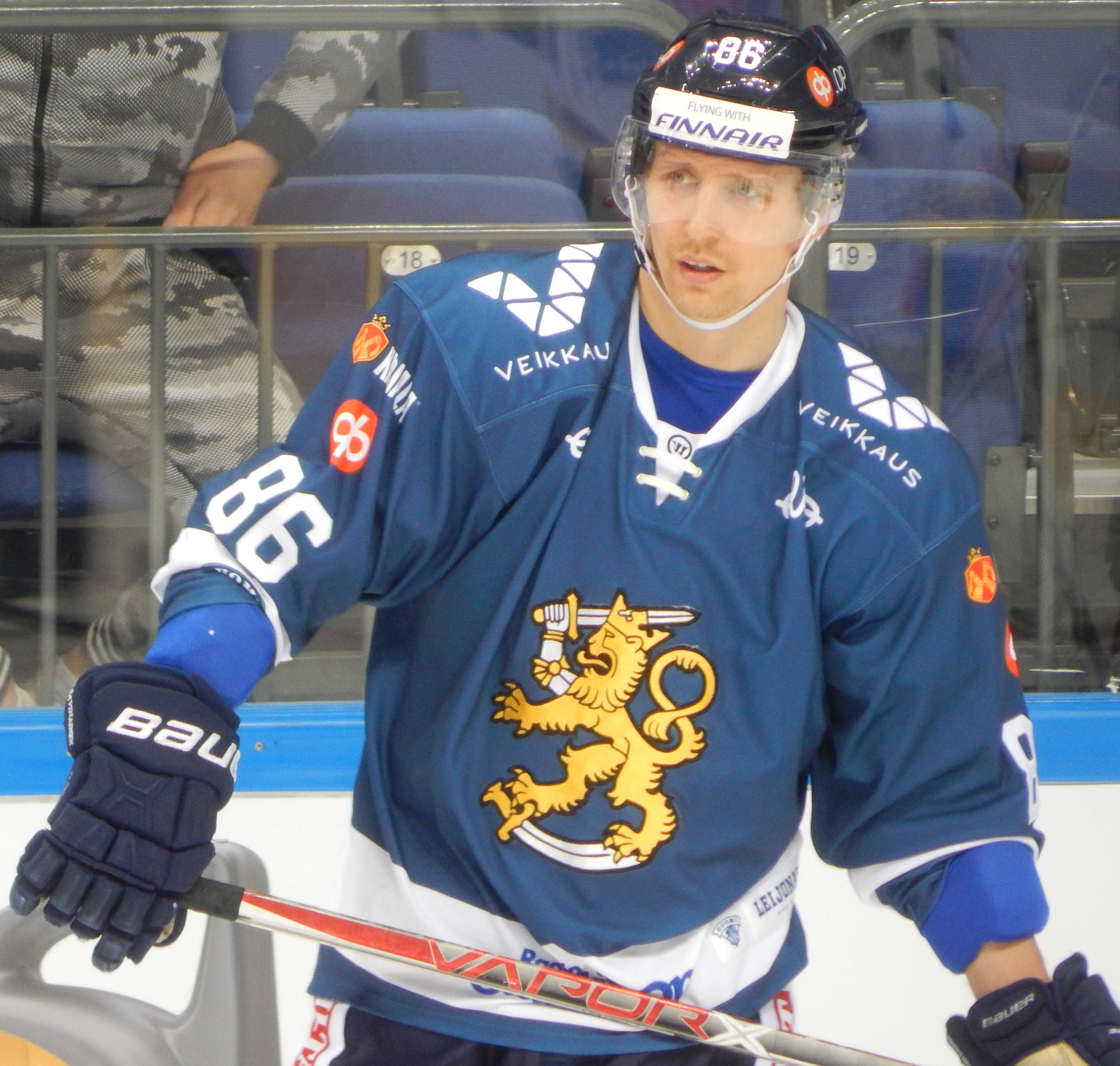
- Savinainen with Finland in 2017
- Born: 5 January 1986 (age 40) Espoo, Finland
- Height: 6 ft 0 in (183 cm)
- Weight: 181 lb (82 kg; 12 st 13 lb)
- Position: Forward
- Shoots: Left
- Liiga team Former teams: HC TPS; Ässät; HC Yugra; Leksands IF; Torpedo Nizhny Novgorod; Kunlun Red Star; Jokerit
- National team: Finland
- Playing career: 2005–present

Veli-Matti Savinainen (born 5 January 1986) is a Finnish ice hockey player who plays for HC TPS in the Finnish Elite League]. A versatile player, Savinainen plays as a left winger and centre. Savinainen has won world championship gold in 2019 and silver in 2014, playing for Finland. He has also won six Finnish Championships, with HC Ässät in 2013 and with Tappara in 2016, 2017, 2022, 2023, and 2024. Savinainen also won the Champions Hockey League championship with Tappara in 2023, and represented Finland at the 2018 Winter Olympics.

== Playing career ==
=== Forssan Palloseura and HC Ässät (2003–2013) ===
Savinainen started playing hockey at the age of three at Espoon Kiekkoseura. He moved to Espoo Blues' U16 team for the 2001–02 season. Savinainen did not play at all during the 2002–2003 season, as in his own words he was not interested in ice hockey. Savinainen said in an interview with C More in January 2023 that he worked as a janitor in Helsinki and that other interests during his teenage years had taken him away from the game. According to Savinainen, however, his father urged him to try playing hockey again. After Savinainen's family moved to Karkkila, he moved to Forssan Palloseura for the 2003–04 season. During the 2005–06 season, he was promoted to Forssan Palloseura's Mestis team, where in his rookie season he scored six points in 35 regular season games. His season was cut short due to military service. In May 2006, Savinainen signed a one-year contract extension with the club.

In the 2006–07 season, Savinainen made his breakthrough in Mestis as he led Forssan Palloseura with 33 points. However, the team was relegated to the Suomi-sarja at the end of the season and Savinainen was already ending his career, but Karri Kivi, who was the former head coach of Forssan Palloseura, convinced him to join the Finnish Elite League team HC Ässät, where he received a try-out contract in May 2007. Savinainen earned a contract with the team for the rest of the 2007–08 season in October. He made his professional debut in HC Ässät's second game of the season on 15 September 2007, away against Tampereen Ilves. Savinainen scored his first career goal in the top league on 6 October 2007 against KalPa. He also scored two assists. He scored six points in his first 14 games. Overall, Savinainen's rookie season in the Finnish Elite League was quite uneven. In total, he scored 11 points in 48 regular season matches. Savinainen also played two games on loan at Mestis team KooKoo in October 2007.

In the 2008–09 season, Savinainen took on a larger role in HC Ässät, scoring 25 points in 51 regular season games. His plus-minus rating of +10 was the best on the team. At the end of the regular season, on 21 February 21 2009, HPK player Janne Kolehmainen checked Savinainen to the head on open ice. Savinainen suffered a concussion and multiple facial fractures. The injury ended Savinainen's season and he missed the relegation games. Kolehmainen received a 2+2+10-minute suspension for slashing, roughing, and a conduct penalty in the game. Despite Savinainen's injury, Kolehmainen was only suspended for one game. Before his injury, Savinainen signed a two-year contract extension with HC Ässät that same month.

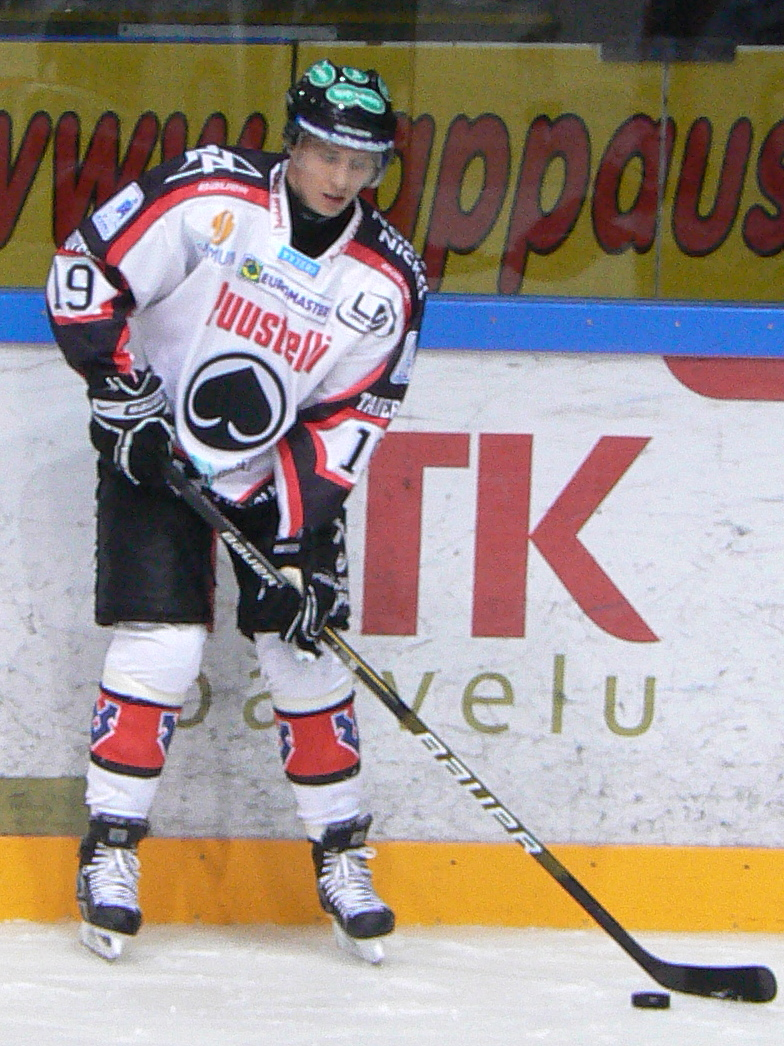
Savinainen with HC Ässät in September 2009

Savinainen's performance was slightly lower in the 2009–10 season, as he only scored 13 points in 50 regular season games. He was also disturbed by a hand injury in fall 2009. In December of that year, Savinainen extended his contract by two years. His ineffectiveness continued into the early part of the 2010–11 season, but in spring, Savinainen rose to the HC Ässät first line alongside Matti Kuparinen and Tommi Huhtala. On 1 March 2011, he scored a hat-trick away against Turun Palloseura.

In the 2011–12 season, Savinainen established himself as one of the HC Ässät top scorers. He was the team's third-highest scorer with 17 goals. Savinainen scored a total of 31 points in the regular season. In November 2011, he extended his contract until spring 2014. In the 2012–13 season, Savinainen rose to the elite of the Finnish Elite League. His regular season was limited to just 46 games due to an upper body injury he suffered. However, Savinainen was the HC Ässät top goal scorer with 20 goals and shared the team's internal points record with Michael Ryan with 36 points after Stephen Dixon left. He made Finnish Elite League history on 22 April 2013 in the fifth final match away against Tappara, when he decided the longest final match of all time, scoring the 1–2 winning goal for HC Ässät in the third overtime period at 108.59. He won the Finnish Championship at the end of the final series.

=== Move to the KHL and stint in Sweden (2013–2015) ===
Savinainen did not play until the end of his HC Ässät contract, as he signed a two-year deal with Kontinental Hockey League (KHL) club Yugra Khanty-Mansiysk in the summer of 2013. He also received media attention after attracting two of his friends who worked as warehouse workers, to join him in Khanty-Mansiysk. He promised to pay them the equivalent of their monthly salaries for house chores. Savinainen scored 19 points in 49 regular season games in the 2013–14 season. Savinainen scored 13 goals, which was enough for to lead his team. In July 2014, the team terminated Savinainen's contract. In August, he signed a contract with Leksands IF of the Swedish Hockey League (SHL), which covered the 2014–15 season. However, Savinainen did not enjoy his time at Leksand and left the team in November 2014 and moved to KHL club Torpedo Nizhny Novgorod on a contract that covered the rest of the season.

=== Move to Tappara, two Finnish Championships (2015–2017) ===
For the 2015–16 season, Savinainen returned to Finland and signed a two-year contract with Tappara. The team featured Stephen Dixon, a former teammate he knew from HC Ässät. Savinainen's season included an absence of a month due to a skate cut in December 2015. He ultimately scored 22 points in 44 games in the regular season and four points in 18 games in the playoffs. He won his second Finnish Championship at the end of the season.

Savinainen was named Tappara's alternate captain for the 2016–17 season. He improved his performance considerably from the previous season and set his personal single-season Finnish Elite League point record with 56 points. Savinainen led the league in goals and finished second in points behind only teammate Henrik Haapala. Savinainen was awarded the Aarne Honkavaara trophy at the end of the season for scoring the most goals. Savinainen won his third and second consecutive Finnish Championship at the end of the season and was voted into the Finnish Elite League All-Star Team.

=== Return to the KHL (2017–2022) ===
For the 2017–18 season, Savinainen returned to the KHL team Yugra Khanty-Mansiysk on a one-year contract. His season proved to be a disappointment on both a personal and team level. However, Savinainen's performance with 17 points was enough to place third in Yugra's internal points tally.

Savinainen joined the Chinese KHL club Kunlun Red Star on a one-year contract for the 2018–19 season. The team was coached by Jussi Tapola, whom he knew from Tappara. Savinainen joined the Finnish KHL club Jokerit on a two-year contract for the 2019–20 season. He set his career best KHL record with 24 points. In the quarterfinals, Savinainen was the team's top scorer with three goals, along with Nicklas Jensen and Antti Pihlström. In the 2020–2021 season, he was the Jokerit's third-highest scorer with 14 goals. In August 2021, Savinainen signed a one-year contract extension with the club. In the 2021–22 season, Savinainen scored five goals and 12 points in 45 games, until in February 2022, Jokerit terminated the contracts of Savinainen and other players after their season ended prematurely due to the Russian invasion of Ukraine.

=== Return to Tappara, triple championships (2022–present) ===
Savinainen returned to the Finnish Elite League team Tappara immediately after his Jokerit contract expired, signing a contract that would last until the end of the 2021–2022 season. Savinainen joined the team for the Champions Hockey League final against Rögle, which ended in a 2–1 loss for Tappara. In the Finnish Elite League play-offs, he shared the overall lead with his teammate Joona Luoto and HC TPS player Mikael Pyyhtiä with eight goals. Of Savinainen's goals, three were winning goals, which he scored the most in the entire league. In the fifth semi-final match on 14 April 2022 against his former team KooKoo, Savinainen's shorthanded goal was the winning goal in a 4–1 win for Tappara, which sealed a place in the finals for the team. He won the Finnish Championship again at the end of the season. In May 2022, Savinainen signed a one-year contract extension with Tappara.

In the 2022–23 season, Savinainen was Tappara's second-best scorer after Jori Lehterä with 44 points and shared second place in the team's goal statistic with Petteri Puhakka, behind Niko Ojamäki. In the Champions Hockey League final on 18 February 2023, away against Swedish Luleå HF, he received the second assist on Jori Lehterä's 0–3 lead goal, which decided the CHL championship for the team. In the fifth Finnish Elite League final on 27 April 2023, Savinainen scored a 4–4 equalizer for Tappara just one second before the end of regular time, when Tappara sought a tie without a goalie. His goal was upheld after a video review. Tappara eventually won the Finnish Championship, when Marcus Davidsson scored the 5–4 winner in the first overtime period at 68:57. The championship was his fifth in the Finnish Elite League. He was awarded the Jari Kurri Trophy as the most valuable player of the playoffs and was voted into the Finnish Elite League All-Star Team. In May 2023, Savinainen signed a one-year contract extension with the club.

The 2023–2024 season was a broken one for Savinainen, as he played only 23 games in the regular season, in which he scored eight goals and a total of 19 points. In November 2023, Savinainen was sidelined for eight weeks when TPS's Sisu-Petteri Lehtonen hit him in the knee. Savinainen returned to the ice in January 2024, until he injured the same knee again in a faceoff. Savinainen was sidelined for over a month and returned to the ice in March. In the playoffs, he scored four goals and a total of 11 points in 15 games. Savinainen managed to score in the first two final games. When the final games of the previous season are included, he became the first player in Finnish Elite League history to score in five consecutive final games. Savinainen surpassed Matti Hagman (HIFK 1983), Petri Varis (Jokerit 1997) and Vladimír Machulda (Kärpät 2004), who had scored in four consecutive matches. At the end of the season, he won his sixth Finnish Championship, and his third consecutive with Tappara. In April 2024, Savinainen signed a one-year extension with Tappara.

== International play ==
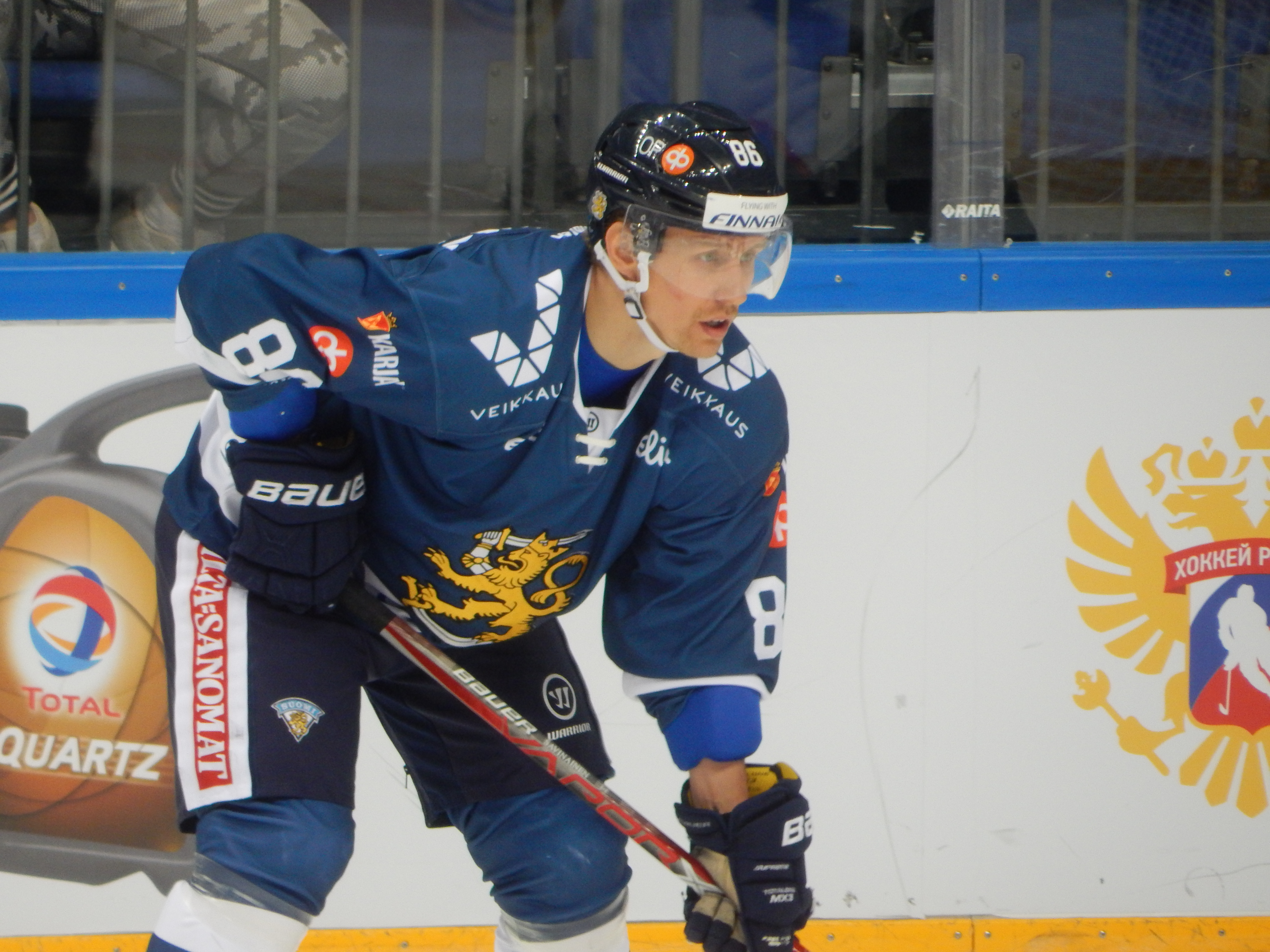
- Savinainen with Finland in 2017

Medal record

Ice hockey

Representing Finland

World Championships
Gold medal – first place	2019 Slovakia	
Silver medal – second place	2014 Belarus	

Savinainen represented Finland at the 2018 Olympic Games. He was also named as a reserve player for the team at the 2022 Beijing Olympics. Savinainen also played at the 2013, 2014, 2017, 2018, and 2019 World Championships, winning the 2019 tournament and the finishing the 2014 tournament with a silver medal. In the 2017 tournament, he was the second-highest scorer and third-highest points scorer on his team with seven points. Savinainen was selected by the coaching staff as one of the three best players of the Finnish team. He was also selected as his team's best player at the end of the preliminary round match against Slovenia. Savinainen served as Finland's alternate captain in the 2019 tournament.

Savinainen has played a total of 105 senior level national games with 47 points. Savinainen made his senior national team debut on 4 April 2012 in a Euro Hockey Challenge match against Switzerland in Rapperswil. He was immediately assigned to the left wing of Finland's first line-up alongside Mika Pyörälä and Jesse Joensuu. Savinainen's first international goal came in the second match against Switzerland in Arosa on 6 April 2012. Savinainen was ultimately eliminated from Finland's final World Championship squad among the last players. He was also left out of the 2021 team at the last minute when Savinainen did not recover as expected from surgery after the KHL season.

== Personal life ==
Savinainen has played in the Finnish roller hockey league for the team Pahalampi. Savinainen played football until he was 15. According to his own words, he also tried to make rap music when he was 14–15, at which time Savinainen unofficially used the stage name MC Waterdoctor. Savinainen was fined in 2013 for an assault that occurred in March 2012.

In June 2018, it was announced that Savinainen would start as a shareholder in the Kiekko-Espoo organization, which was playing in the Suomi-sarja at the time.

In March 2026, Savinainen sparked controversy, as he refused to wear a specific pride jersey in an equality themed match organized by his employer TPS, stating that he does not consider pride ideology something which he wishes to personally support.

== Career statistics ==
=== Regular season and playoffs ===
			Regular season					Playoffs
Season	Team	League	GP	G	A	Pts	PIM	GP	G	A	Pts	PIM
2001–02	Blues	FIN U16	12	11	4	15	18	2	0	0	0	0
2003–04	FoPS	FIN.2 U20	28	9	8	17	45	—	—	—	—	—
2004–05	FoPS	FIN.2 U20	12	2	6	8	20	—	—	—	—	—
2004–05	FoPS	FIN.3 U20	13	6	7	13	24	2	0	3	3	32
2005–06	FoPS	FIN.3 U20	1	0	2	2	2	—	—	—	—	—
2005–06	FPS	Mestis	35	3	3	6	20	—	—	—	—	—
2006–07	FPS	Mestis	44	14	19	33	60	—	—	—	—	—
2007–08	Ässät	SM-l	48	4	7	11	52	—	—	—	—	—
2007–08	KooKoo	Mestis	2	1	1	2	2	—	—	—	—	—
2008–09	Ässät	SM-l	51	6	19	25	18	—	—	—	—	—
2009–10	Ässät	SM-l	50	6	7	13	48	—	—	—	—	—
2010–11	Ässät	SM-l	55	9	13	22	34	6	0	3	3	0
2011–12	Ässät	SM-l	60	17	14	31	67	4	1	1	2	2
2012–13	Ässät	SM-l	46	20	16	36	43	16	4	5	9	10
2013–14	HC Yugra	KHL	49	13	6	19	54	—	—	—	—	—
2014–15	Leksands IF	SHL	24	5	5	10	12	—	—	—	—	—
2014–15	Torpedo Nizhny Novgorod	KHL	25	2	3	5	4	4	0	0	0	10
2015–16	Tappara	Liiga	44	7	15	22	18	18	2	2	4	28
2016–17	Tappara	Liiga	55	30	26	56	36	17	5	6	11	30
2017–18	HC Yugra	KHL	50	9	8	17	10	—	—	—	—	—
2018–19	Kunlun Red Star	KHL	37	9	9	18	45	—	—	—	—	—
2019–20	Jokerit	KHL	44	11	13	24	27	6	3	0	3	6
2020–21	Jokerit	KHL	52	14	10	24	58	4	0	0	0	2
2021–22	Jokerit	KHL	45	5	7	12	23	—	—	—	—	—
Liiga totals			409	99	117	216	316	61	12	17	29	70
KHL totals			302	63	56	119	225	14	3	0	3	18
SHL totals			24	5	5	10	12	—	—	—	—	—

=== International ===
Year	Team	Event	Result	GP	G	A	Pts	PIM
2013	Finland	WC	4th	10	3	1	4	4
2014	Finland	WC	2nd place, silver medalist(s)	7	0	0	0	2
2017	Finland	WC	4th	10	3	4	7	4
2018	Finland	OG	6th	5	1	1	2	2
2018	Finland	WC	5th	8	4	4	8	6
2019	Finland	WC	1st place, gold medalist(s)	10	0	5	5	0
Senior totals				50	11	15	26	18
