= Jori Lehterä =

Finnish ice hockey player (born 1987)

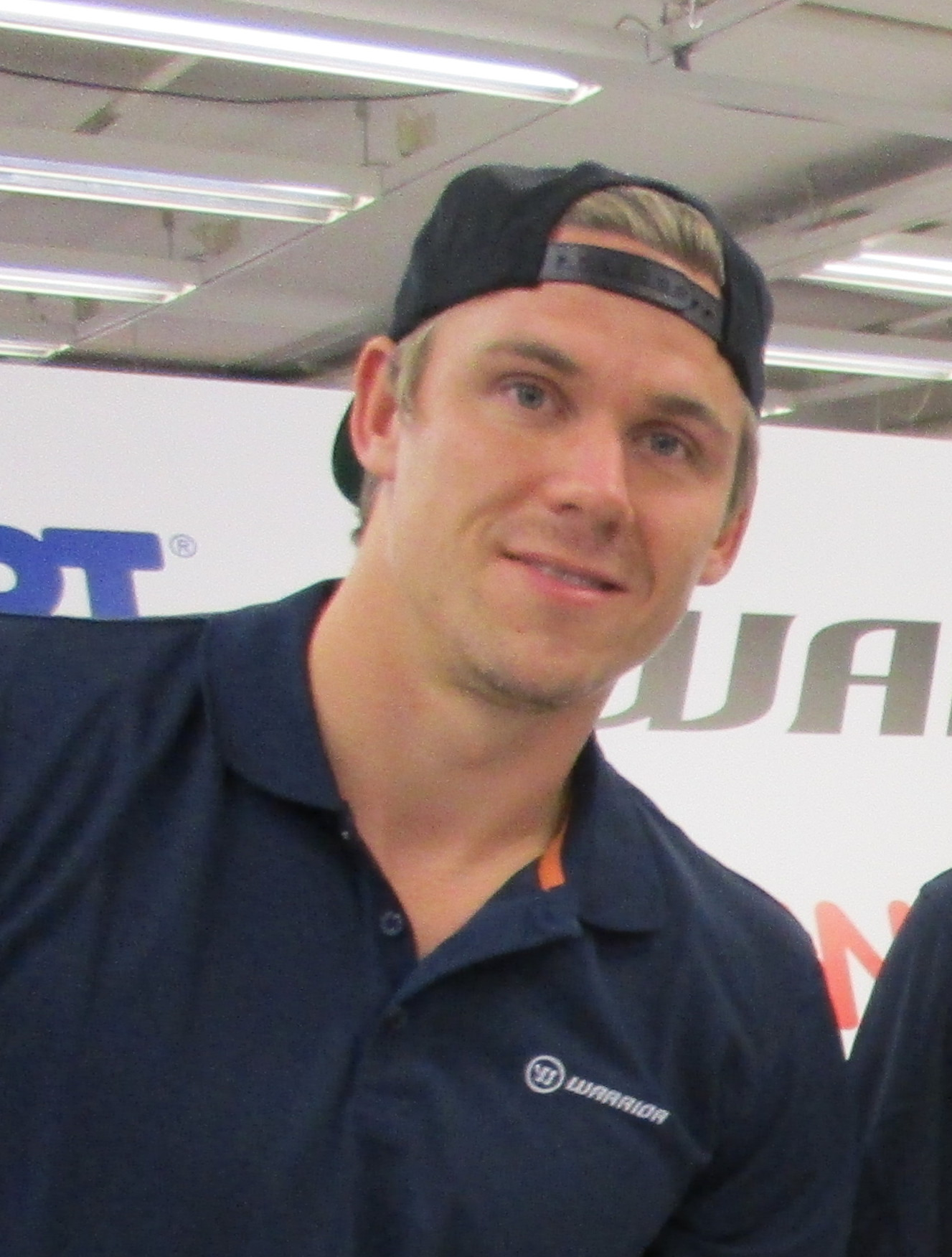
- Lehterä in 2016
- Born: 23 December 1987 (age 38) Lempäälä, Finland
- Height: 6 ft 2 in (188 cm)
- Weight: 212 lb (96 kg; 15 st 2 lb)
- Position: Centre
- Shoots: Left
- Liiga team Former teams: HIFK; Jokerit; Tappara; Lokomotiv Yaroslavl; Sibir Novosibirsk; St. Louis Blues; Philadelphia Flyers; SKA Saint Petersburg; Spartak Moscow
- National team: Finland
- NHL draft: 65th overall, 2008; St. Louis Blues
- Playing career: 2006–present

Jori Jonatan Lehterä (born 23 December 1987) is a Finnish professional ice hockey player who is a centre for HIFK of the Liiga. He was selected by the St. Louis Blues in the third round, 65th overall, of the 2008 NHL entry draft. He won a bronze medal with Finland at the 2014 Winter Olympics.

== Playing career ==
Lehterä dominated the Jokerit junior team in scoring, and earned himself a place on the team's SM-liiga roster in the fall of 2006. He was selected to represent Finland at the 2006 World Junior Championships, but could not play due to an injury. In April 2007, he signed a three-year contract with Tappara.

Lehterä was drafted by the St. Louis Blues at the 2008 NHL entry draft in the third round, 65th overall. He made the move to North America for the 2008–09 season to play for the Peoria Rivermen, the American Hockey League (AHL) affiliate of the Blues. However, he played just seven games for Peoria, recording just one assist, before returning to Tappara in Finland to close out the season, where he was ultimately named the SM-liiga's most valuable player (MVP) after scoring 19 goals and 50 assists for 69 points.

After playing one season with Lokomotiv Yaroslavl of the Kontinental Hockey League (KHL), Lehterä moved to KHL rivals Sibir Novosibirsk from 2011–12 to 2013–14, the latter of which he scored 12 goals and 32 assists to lead the team in points, with 44. After yearly consistent performances for Novosibirsk, he played for Finland at the 2014 Winter Olympics, where he recorded one goal and three assists in four games for the bronze medal-winning Finland team.

On 1 July 2014, Lehterä signed a two-year, $5.5 million contract with the St. Louis Blues, the organization still retaining his NHL rights after initially drafting him in 2008. He was named the NHL's First Star of the Week for 10–17 November after posting four goals and two assists in three games for St. Louis.

He was traded by the Blues along with a 2017 first-round pick and a conditional 2018 first-round pick to the Philadelphia Flyers in exchange for Brayden Schenn, at the 2017 draft on June 23, 2017.

Lehterä signed a one-year contract with the KHL's SKA Saint Petersburg on 6 June 2019. In the 2019–20 season, he posted 15 goals and 30 points in his return to the KHL before the season was abruptly ended due to the ongoing COVID-19 pandemic.

As a free agent at the conclusion of his contract, Lehterä opted to continue in the KHL, agreeing to a one-year deal with Spartak Moscow on 12 May 2020.

On 16 June 2022, Lehterä returned to play in Finnish Liiga for the first time in 12 years, agreeing to a one-year contract with former club and reigning champions, Tappara.

== Personal life ==
Lehterä's uncle, Tero Lehterä, was a member of Finland's team what won gold medals in the 1995 World Championships.

In September 2018, Finland's police announced that they had conducted a raid on Lehterä's home, resulting in several arrests and the seizure of cocaine. Lehterä was not home at the time, but police believed that he was involved in a distribution ring with about 20 other people. On 1 January 2019, it was reported that Lehterä was not involved in the distribution part of the ring; just purchasing and possessing.

== Career statistics ==
Medal record

Men's ice hockey

Representing Finland

Winter Olympics
Bronze medal – third place	2014 Sochi	

World Championships
Silver medal – second place	2014 Belarus	

=== Regular season and playoffs ===
			Regular season					Playoffs
Season	Team	League	GP	G	A	Pts	PIM	GP	G	A	Pts	PIM
2003–04	Jokerit	FIN U18	19	0	6	6	2	5	3	1	4	0
2004–05	Jokerit	FIN U18	30	13	37	50	24	7	6	5	11	2
2005–06	Jokerit	FIN U20	39	14	33	47	16	4	1	4	5	0
2006–07	Jokerit	FIN U20	24	18	48	66	20	5	1	7	8	2
2006–07	Jokerit	SM-l	28	6	6	12	14	—	—	—	—	—
2007–08	Tappara	SM-l	54	13	29	42	32	11	4	2	6	8
2008–09	Tappara	SM-l	58	9	38	47	34	—	—	—	—	—
2008–09	Peoria Rivermen	AHL	7	0	1	1	2	7	1	1	2	10
2009–10	Tappara	SM-l	57	19	50	69	58	9	1	9	10	8
2010–11	Lokomotiv Yaroslavl	KHL	53	16	21	37	38	18	0	3	3	14
2011–12	Sibir Novosibirsk	KHL	25	10	16	26	10	—	—	—	—	—
2012–13	Sibir Novosibirsk	KHL	52	17	29	46	46	3	0	2	2	0
2013–14	Sibir Novosibirsk	KHL	48	12	32	44	22	10	0	6	6	2
2014–15	St. Louis Blues	NHL	75	14	30	44	48	5	0	2	2	0
2015–16	St. Louis Blues	NHL	79	9	25	34	38	20	3	6	9	10
2016–17	St. Louis Blues	NHL	64	7	15	22	34	8	1	3	4	4
2017–18	Philadelphia Flyers	NHL	62	3	5	8	14	6	0	2	2	0
2018–19	Philadelphia Flyers	NHL	27	1	2	3	33	—	—	—	—	—
2018–19	Lehigh Valley Phantoms	AHL	5	1	2	3	4	—	—	—	—	—
2019–20	SKA Saint Petersburg	KHL	51	15	15	30	26	—	—	—	—	—
2020–21	Spartak Moscow	KHL	41	9	35	44	17	4	0	2	2	6
2021–22	Spartak Moscow	KHL	45	10	29	39	21	5	1	1	2	0
2022–23	Tappara	Liiga	57	11	46	57	45	13	5	11	16	6
2023–24	HIFK	Liiga	57	6	50	56	36	7	1	3	4	4
2024–25	HIFK	Liiga	51	7	52	59	14	4	0	0	0	2
Liiga totals			362	71	271	342	233	48	15	31	46	32
KHL totals			315	89	177	266	180	40	1	14	15	22
NHL totals			307	34	77	111	167	39	4	13	17	14

=== International ===
Year	Team	Event	Result	GP	G	A	Pts	PIM
2010	Finland	WC	6th	5	0	0	0	0
2014	Finland	OG	3rd place, bronze medalist(s)	6	1	3	4	0
2014	Finland	WC	2nd place, silver medalist(s)	10	3	9	12	10
2016	Finland	WCH	8th	3	0	0	0	2
Senior totals				24	4	12	16	12

== Awards and honours ==
Award	Year	Ref
Champions Hockey League
Champion	2022–23	
Liiga
Kanada-malja champion	2022–23	
Kultainen kypärä	2010	
Lasse Oksanen trophy	2010	
Veli-Pekka Ketola trophy	2010	
KHL
All-Star Game	2013, 2014	
