= Henri Kiviaho =

Finnish ice hockey player (born 1994)

- Born: February 26, 1994 (age 32) Lappeenranta, Finland
- Height: 6 ft 4 in (193 cm)
- Weight: 192 lb (87 kg; 13 st 10 lb)
- Position: Goaltender
- Catches: Left
- Slovak Extraliga team Former teams: HC Slovan Bratislava; KalPa; Idaho Steelheads; Ilves; Ässät; IPK; HC Nové Zámky
- NHL draft: 144th overall, 2012; Dallas Stars
- Playing career: 2012–present

Henri Kiviaho (born February 26, 1994) is a Finnish ice hockey goaltender currently playing with HC Slovan Bratislava in the Slovak Extraliga. While playing with KalPa in the Liiga, Kiviaho was selected by the Dallas Stars in the 5th round (144th overall) of the 2012 NHL entry draft.

== Playing career ==
On July 7, 2014, Kiviaho was signed to a three-year entry-level contract with the Stars. In his first North American season in 2014–15, Kiviaho was assigned to ECHL affiliate, the Idaho Steelheads. Kiviaho recorded 10 wins in 21 games, however was unable to earn a recall to the American Hockey League.

On July 31, 2015, Kiviaho was returned to Finland on loan by the Stars, to compete for the starting position in the Liiga with Ilves Tampere.

After a second stint in North America with the Idaho Steelheads, Kiviaho concluded his contract with the Stars unable to make progression in their depth chart. On April 18, 2017, Kiviaho agreed to an optional two-year deal to return to Finland with Ässät of the Liiga.
