= Valtteri Kemiläinen =

Finnish ice hockey player

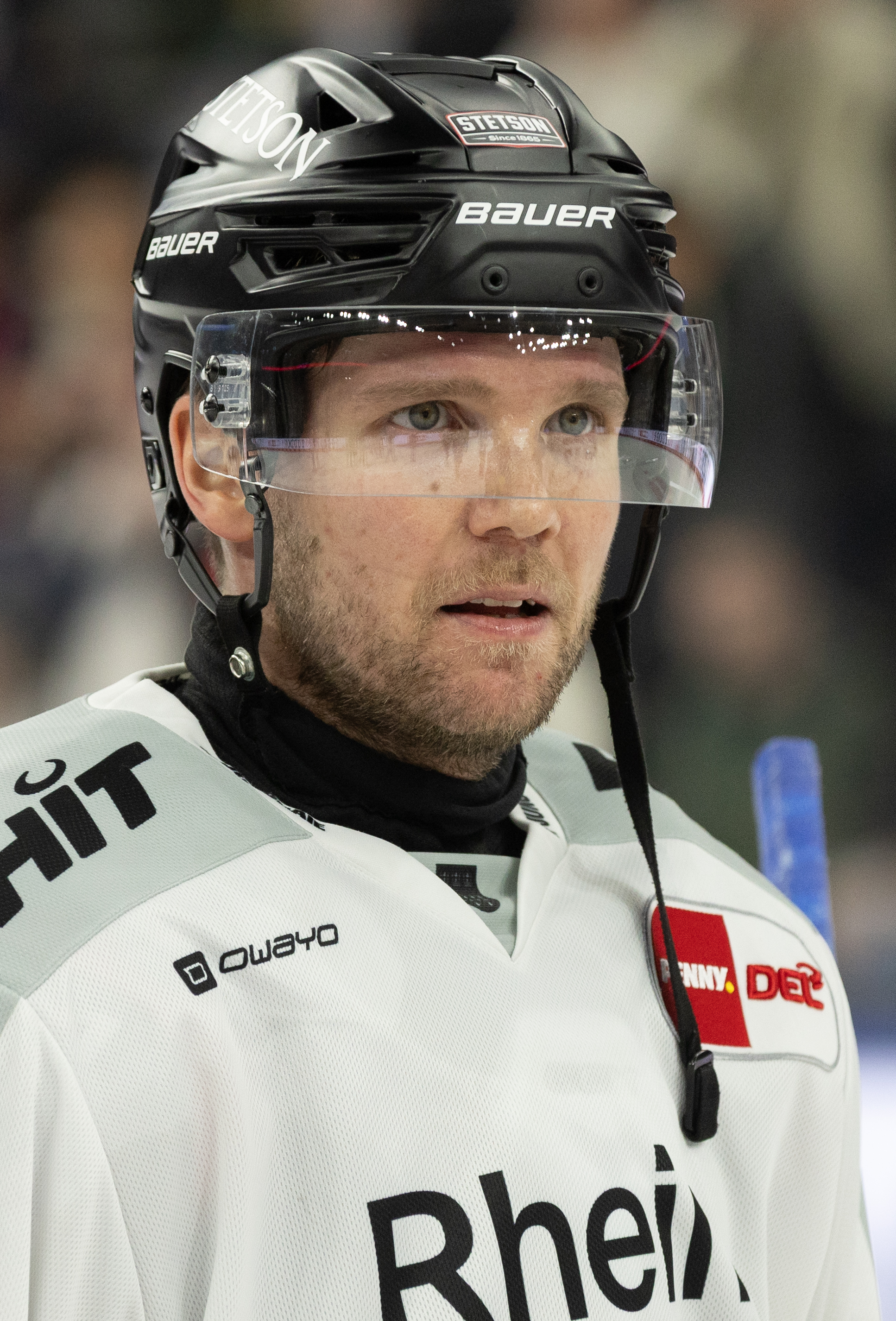
- Kemiläinen in 2025
- Born: 16 December 1991 (age 34) Jyväskylä, Finland
- Height: 6 ft 0 in (183 cm)
- Weight: 196 lb (89 kg; 14 st 0 lb)
- Position: Defense
- Shoots: Right
- DEL team Former teams: Kölner Haie; JYP Jyväskylä; Tappara; HC Vityaz; Rögle BK; HC Sparta Praha
- National team: Finland
- Playing career: 2012–present

Valtteri Kemiläinen (born 16 December 1991) is a Finnish professional ice hockey player for Kölner Haie of the Deutsche Eishockey Liga (DEL).

== Playing career ==
Kemiläinen made his Liiga debut playing with JYP Jyväskylä during the 2013–14 Liiga season. He later joined Tappara, in which he played 5 professional seasons with before leaving as a free agent following the 2020–21 season.

On May 21, 2021, Kemiläinen left the Liiga and signed his first contract abroad in agreeing to a one-year deal with Russian club, HC Vityaz of the Kontinental Hockey League (KHL).

== Career statistics ==
=== Regular season and playoffs ===
			Regular season					Playoffs
Season	Team	League	GP	G	A	Pts	PIM	GP	G	A	Pts	PIM
2006–07	Diskos	FIN.2 U16 Q	8	2	0	2	20	—	—	—	—	—
2006–07	Diskos	FIN.3 U16	11	2	6	8	16	—	—	—	—	—
2008–09	Diskos	FIN.2 U18	24	4	10	14	18	—	—	—	—	—
2019–10	Diskos	FIN.2 U18	25	4	20	24	36	—	—	—	—	—
2010–11	Diskos	FIN.3 U20	1	0	0	0	2	—	—	—	—	—
2010–11	JYP	FIN U20	18	0	6	6	20	—	—	—	—	—
2011–12	JYP	FIN U20	42	14	19	33	52	3	0	1	1	22
2012–13	JYP–Akatemia	Mestis	45	5	9	14	52	—	—	—	—	—
2013–14	JYP–Akatemia	Mestis	43	3	18	21	44	—	—	—	—	—
2014–15	JYP	Liiga	36	2	12	14	22	4	0	0	0	0
2014–15	JYP–Akatemia	Mestis	11	1	9	10	12	—	—	—	—	—
2015–16	JYP	Liiga	43	8	17	25	24	10	1	3	4	14
2016–17	Tappara	Liiga	34	4	16	20	22	18	3	8	11	10
2017–18	Tappara	Liiga	60	4	11	15	38	16	1	0	1	12
2018–19	Tappara	Liiga	57	10	21	31	53	11	1	3	4	4
2019–20	Tappara	Liiga	42	4	31	35	40	—	—	—	—	—
2020–21	Tappara	Liiga	31	11	14	25	32	9	1	2	3	2
2021–22	HC Vityaz	KHL	37	5	21	26	30	—	—	—	—	—
2021–22	Rögle BK	SHL	8	2	3	5	2	—	—	—	—	—
2022–23	Tappara	Liiga	43	8	34	42	22	14	0	10	10	4
2023–24	Tappara	Liiga	50	9	27	36	32	16	0	7	7	10
2024–25	HC Sparta Praha	ELH	45	6	14	20	32	9	3	3	6	0
2025–26	Kölner Haie	DEL	51	14	29	43	34	10	1	4	5	6
Liiga totals			396	60	183	243	285	98	7	33	40	56

Medal record

Ice hockey

Representing Finland

Olympic Games
Gold medal – first place	2022 Beijing	

=== International ===
Year	Team	Event	Result	GP	G	A	Pts	PIM
2022	Finland	OG	1st place, gold medalist(s)	6	1	0	1	2
Senior totals				6	1	0	1	2
