= Juhani Tyrväinen =

Finnish ice hockey player (born 1990)

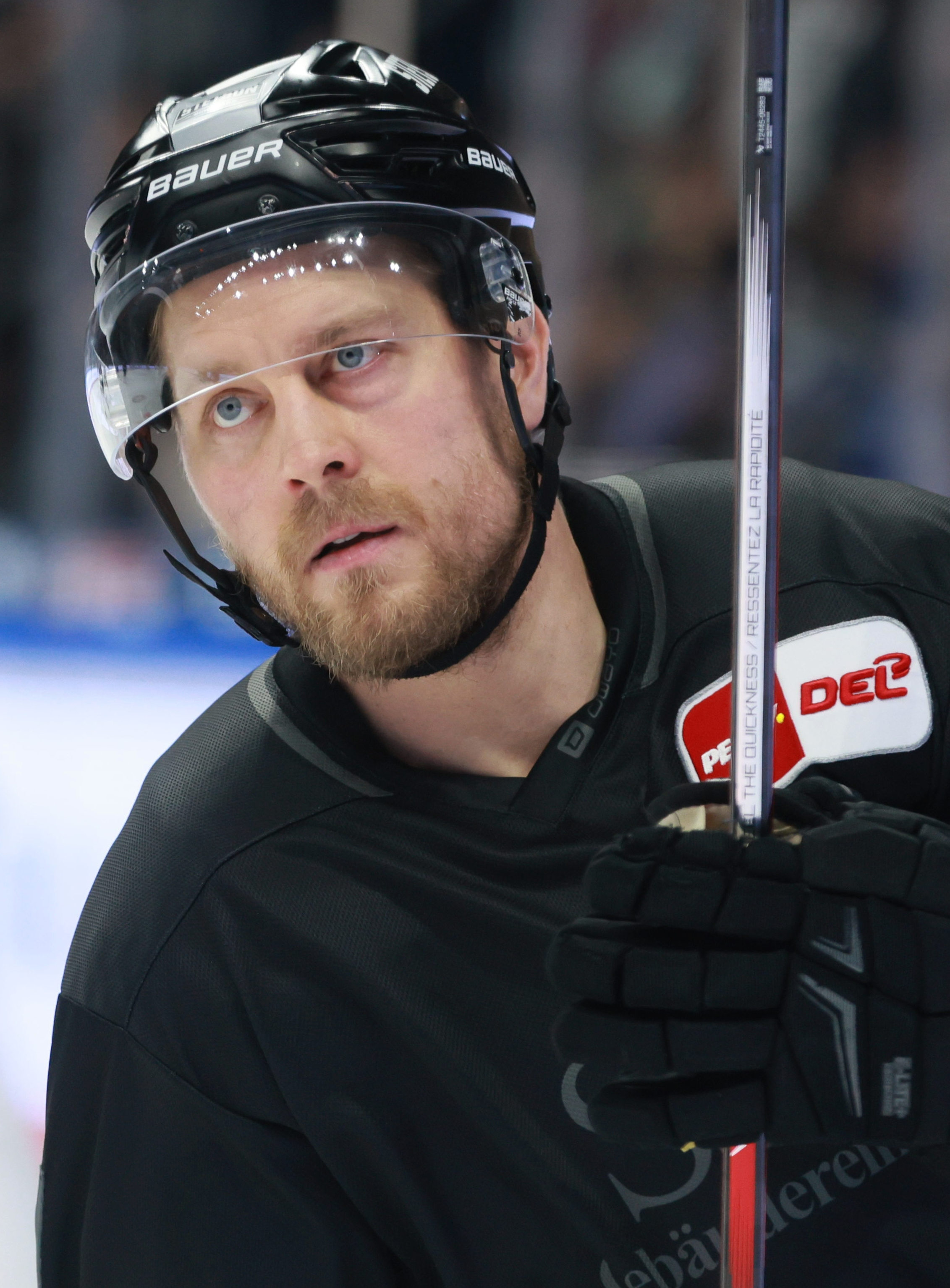
- Born: 11 September 1990 (age 36) Seinäjoki, Finland
- Height: 5 ft 11 in (180 cm)
- Weight: 192 lb (87 kg; 13 st 10 lb)
- Position: Forward
- Shoots: Left
- SHL team Former teams: Luleå HF; Lahti Pelicans; Jokerit; HIFK
- National team: Finland
- Playing career: 2011–present

Medal record

Ice hockey

Representing Finland

World Championships
| Gold medal – first place | 2019 Slovakia | |

Juhani Tyrväinen (born 11 September 1990) is a Finnish professional ice hockey forward who currently plays for the German hockey team Kölner Haie in the German Hockey League (DEL).

== Playing career ==
Tyrväinen played at the junior level with the Lahti Pelicans, he made his professional debut with the Pelicans in the SM-liiga during the 2010–11 season.

Following his ninth season in the Liiga in 2018–19, Tyrväinen left HIFK and opted to move to the SHL as a free agent, signing a two-year contract with Luleå HF on 23 April 2019.

Juhani's brother Antti Tyrväinen also plays professionally with the Lahti Pelicans.
