= Oscar Engsund =

Swedish ice hockey defenceman

- Born: August 3, 1993 (age 32) Gothenburg, Sweden
- Height: 6 ft 2 in (188 cm)
- Weight: 212 lb (96 kg; 15 st 2 lb)
- Position: Defence
- Shoots: Left
- SHL team Former teams: Luleå HF; IK Oskarshamn; Frölunda HC; HV71
- Playing career: 2011–present

Oscar Engsund (born August 3, 1993) is a Swedish ice hockey defenceman currently playing with Luleå HF in the Swedish Hockey League (SHL).

He made his Elitserien debut playing with the club during the 2012–13 Elitserien season.
