= Jussi Tapola =

Finnish ice hockey coach (born 1974)

- Born: June 13, 1974 (age 51); Kerava, Finland
- Occupations: Head Coach, Hockey Club Ambrì-Piotta

Jussi Tapola (born June 13, 1974) is a Finnish ice hockey coach. Since January 27th 2026 he is the head coach of Hockey Club Ambrì-Piotta in the Swiss National League.

== Career ==
Tapola spent his playing days in Finnish lower leagues, mostly turning out for Ahmat Hyvinkää. From 2004 to 2009, he worked as a youth coach at HPK and was promoted to assistant of the club’s Liiga squad prior to the 2009-10 season. He then served as head coach of Finland’s junior-national teams until 2012.

He joined the coaching staff of Liiga side Tappara as an assistant ahead of the 2012-13 campaign and was handed head coaching duties in 2014. As a first-year head coach, he guided the team to the 2015 Liiga finals, where they lost. The following year, Tapola was named the Liiga Coach of the Year after claiming the title with Tappara. After his time in Tappara, Tapola headed to China's team Kunlun who plays in KHL.

== Achievements ==
- 2016, 2017, 2022, 2023: Finnish national champion, Kanada-malja (as head coach)
- 2023, CHL champion (as head coach)
- 2016: Kalevi Numminen Trophy (Liiga Coach of the Year)
