= Otto Rauhala =

Finnish ice hockey player

- Born: 12 April 1995 (age 30); Ylöjärvi, Finland
- Height: 5 ft 10 in (178 cm)
- Weight: 198 lb (90 kg; 14 st 2 lb)
- Position: Forward
- Shoots: Left
- Liiga team: Tappara
- NHL draft: Undrafted
- Playing career: 2013–present

Otto Rauhala (born 12 April 1995) is a Finnish professional ice hockey player. He is currently playing for Tappara of the Finnish Liiga. Rauhala's role is mostly being the stocky Harri Kirvesniemi-like bulldog.

Rauhala made his Liiga debut playing with Tappara during the 2013–14 Liiga season.
