= Niko Ojamäki =

Finnish ice hockey player

- Born: 17 June 1995 (age 31) Pori, Finland
- Height: 5 ft 11 in (180 cm)
- Weight: 183 lb (83 kg; 13 st 1 lb)
- Position: Right wing
- Shoots: Right
- NL team Former teams: EHC Kloten; Ässät; Linköping HC; HC Vityaz; Tappara
- National team: Finland
- Playing career: 2013–present

Niko Ojamäki (born 17 June 1995) is a Finnish professional ice hockey player for EHC Kloten of the National League.

== Playing career ==
Ojamäki made his Liiga debut playing with Ässät during the 2013–14 Liiga season.

After establishing himself in the Liiga through four seasons with Ässät, Ojamäki left following the 2016–17 season, to sign an initial two-year contract with Tappara on May 29, 2017.

Ojamäki played the 2020–21 season with Linköping HC of the Swedish Hockey League (SHL), collecting 5 goals and 16 points in 48 regular season games. Leaving Sweden as a free agent, Ojamäki moved to the KHL, agreeing to a one-year deal with Russian-based, HC Vityaz, on 21 May 2021.

On 23 June 2022, Ojamäki returned to the Liiga signing a one-year contract with former club, Tappara.

== Career statistics ==
=== Regular season and playoffs ===
			Regular season					Playoffs
Season	Team	League	GP	G	A	Pts	PIM	GP	G	A	Pts	PIM
2011–12	Ässät	FIN U18 Q	3	5	1	6	0	—	—	—	—	—
2011–12	Ässät	FIN U18	7	6	3	9	2	—	—	—	—	—
2011–12	Ässät	Jr. A	40	7	15	22	8	5	0	1	1	0
2012–13	Ässät	FIN U18	4	5	4	9	0	8	3	2	5	25
2012–13	Ässät	Jr. A	47	10	16	26	16	—	—	—	—	—
2013–14	Ässät	Jr. A	48	20	23	43	6	11	5	2	7	0
2013–14	Ässät	Liiga	5	0	0	0	0	—	—	—	—	—
2014–15	Ässät	Jr. A	5	4	0	4	0	—	—	—	—	—
2014–15	Ässät	Liiga	54	8	6	14	4	2	0	0	0	2
2015–16	Ässät	Liiga	60	16	17	33	6	—	—	—	—	—
2015–16	Ässät	Jr. A	2	4	1	5	0	3	0	2	2	2
2016–17	Ässät	Liiga	54	14	12	26	4	3	1	0	1	2
2017–18	Tappara	Liiga	60	8	9	17	10	16	3	1	4	0
2018–19	Tappara	Liiga	58	23	14	37	4	11	1	3	4	2
2019–20	Tappara	Liiga	60	19	16	35	6	—	—	—	—	—
2020–21	Linköping HC	SHL	48	5	11	16	6	—	—	—	—	—
2021–22	HC Vityaz	KHL	48	29	14	43	6	—	—	—	—	—
2022–23	Tappara	Liiga	55	20	21	41	8	14	4	9	13	0
2023–24	EHC Kloten	NL	50	5	14	19	4	—	—	—	—	—
2024–25	EHC Kloten	NL	50	16	17	33	8	9	1	2	3	4
2025–26	Rytíři Kladno	ELH	50	13	16	29	6	5	3	0	3	2
Liiga totals			406	108	95	203	42	46	9	13	22	6
KHL totals			48	29	14	43	6	—	—	—	—	—

Medal record

Ice hockey

Representing Finland

Olympic Games
Gold medal – first place	2022 Beijing	

World Championships
Gold medal – first place	2019 Slovakia	
Silver medal – second place	2021 Latvia	

=== International ===
Year	Team	Event	Result	GP	G	A	Pts	PIM
2012	Finland	IH18	2nd place, silver medalist(s)	5	0	1	1	0
2013	Finland	WJC18	3rd place, bronze medalist(s)	7	0	0	0	2
2015	Finland	WJC	7th	5	0	0	0	2
2019	Finland	WC	1st place, gold medalist(s)	10	1	3	4	2
2021	Finland	WC	2nd place, silver medalist(s)	8	0	2	2	0
2022	Finland	OG	1st place, gold medalist(s)	1	0	1	1	0
Junior totals				17	0	1	1	4
Senior totals				19	1	6	7	2
