= 2023 Spengler Cup =

Ice hockey tournament in Switzerland

Tournament details
- Host country: Switzerland
- Venue(s): Eisstadion Davos
- Dates: 26–31 December
- Teams: 6

Final positions
- Champions: (Switzerland) HC Davos (16th title)
- Runner-up: (Czech Republic) HC Dynamo Pardubice

Tournament statistics
- Games played: 11
- Goals scored: 68 (6.18 per game)
- Scoring leader(s): (Sweden) Dennis Rasmussen (HC Davos) (7 points)

Official website
- Spengler Cup

The 2023 Spengler Cup was held from 26 to 31 December 2023 at Eisstadion Davos, Davos.

== Teams participating ==
- Team Canada
- (Czech Republic) HC Dynamo Pardubice
- (Finland) KalPa
- (Sweden) Frölunda HC
- (Switzerland) HC Ambrì-Piotta
- (Switzerland) HC Davos (host)

== Group stage ==
All times are local (UTC+1).

=== Group Torriani ===
Pos	Team	Pld	W	OTW	OTL	L	GF	GA	GD	Pts	Qualification
1	(Czech Republic) HC Dynamo Pardubice	2	1	1	0	0	5	3	+2	5	Semifinals
2	(Switzerland) HC Ambrì-Piotta	2	1	0	1	0	7	6	+1	4	Quarterfinals
3	(Finland) KalPa	2	0	0	0	2	4	7	−3	0	Quarterfinals

Source: spenglercup.ch

26 December 2023; 14:10	HC Ambrì-Piotta (Switzerland)	2–3 OT (2–0, 0–1, 0–1) (OT: 0–1)	(Czech Republic) HC Dynamo Pardubice	Eisstadion Davos

Game reference

Janne Juvonen
Goalies
Roman Will

Formenton (Dauphin) – 01:02	1–0
Formenton (Virtanen, Dauphin) (PP) – 08:10	2–0
	2–1	29:18 – Paulovič (Poulíček)
	2–2	47:35 – Zohorna (Kousal, Hájek)
	2–3	61:15 – Sedlák

6 min
Penalties
4 min

27 December 2023; 15:10	KalPa (Finland)	3–5 (0–1, 2–1, 1–3)	(Switzerland) HC Ambrì-Piotta	Eisstadion Davos

Game reference

Stefanos Lekkas
Goalies
Benjamin Conz

	0–1	18:28 – Formenton (Heed, Zwerger)
Korhonen (Lantta) (SH) – 22:01	1–1
	1–2	23:20 – Lilja (Heed, Špaček) (PP)
Kantner (Klemetti, Rissanen) – 36:36	2–2
	2–3	41:25 – Heed (PS)
	2–4	44:15 – Mueller (Formenton, Virtanen) (PP)
Korhonen (Sissons, Mäenpää) (PP) – 52:08	3–4
	3–5	58:23 – Dauphin (Formenton, Heed) (ENG)

6 min
Penalties
6 min

28 December 2023; 15:10	HC Dynamo Pardubice (Czech Republic)	2–1 (0–0, 0–0, 2–1)	(Finland) KalPa	Eisstadion Davos

Game reference

Milan Klouček
Goalies
Juha Jatkola

Kousal (Radil, Zohorna) – 41:09	1–0
	1–1	48:30 – Klemetti (Sissons, Pitkänen) (PP)
Zohorna (Klouček) – 57:06	2–1

45 min
Penalties
10 min

=== Group Cattini ===
Pos	Team	Pld	W	OTW	OTL	L	GF	GA	GD	Pts	Qualification
1	(Switzerland) HC Davos (H)	2	2	0	0	0	8	4	+4	6	Semifinals
2	Team Canada	2	1	0	0	1	7	4	+3	3	Quarterfinals
3	(Sweden) Frölunda HC	2	0	0	0	2	1	8	−7	0	Quarterfinals

Source: spenglercup.ch
(H) Host

26 December 2023; 20:15	Frölunda HC (Sweden)	0–4 (0–2, 0–2, 0–0)	Team Canada	Eisstadion Davos

Game reference

Frans Tuohimaa
Goalies
Aaron Dell

0–1	16:58 – Smith (Quenneville, Rizzo)
0–2	18:09 – Hazen (Heatherington, Smith)
0–3	32:45 – Knight (Hazen, Smith) (PP)
0–4	34:57 – Hazen (Leslie, DiDomenico)

31 min
Penalties
12 min

27 December 2023; 20:15	HC Davos (Switzerland)	4–1 (1–0, 1–0, 2–1)	(Sweden) Frölunda HC	Eisstadion Davos

Game reference

Sandro Aeschlimann
Goalies
Lars Johansson

Rasmussen (Dahlbeck, Stránský) – 15:56	1–0
Rasmussen (Andersson, Haapala) (PP) – 36:54	2–0
	2–1	46:27 – Borg (F. Hasa, Innala)
Dahlbeck (Corvi, Olofsson) – 48:45	3–1
Knak (ENG) – 58:43	4–1

2 min
Penalties
4 min

28 December 2023; 20:15	Team Canada	3–4 (1–0, 2–1, 0–3)	(Switzerland) HC Davos	Eisstadion Davos

Game reference

Thomas Milic (00:00 – 47:46)
Aaron Dell (47:46 – 57:59)
Goalies
Gilles Senn

Jooris (Sceviour, Asselin) – 04:48	1–0
	1–1	30:54 – Haapala (Rasmussen, Dahlbeck)
Joly (Leslie, Quenneville) – 37:23	2–1
Quenneville (Rizzo, Ang) – 39:02	3–1
	3–2	41:25 – Fora (Olofsson, Wieser)
	3–3	50:02 – Ambühl (Haapala, Rasmussen)
	3–4	56:16 – Andersson (Wieser, Corvi)

12 min
Penalties
12 min

== Knockout stage ==
=== Bracket ===
Quarterfinals
29 December
T2 (Switzerland) HC Ambrì-Piotta	0
C3 (Sweden) Frölunda HC	5
29 December
C2 Team Canada	6
T3 (Finland) KalPa	3

Semifinals
30 December
C1 (Switzerland) HC Davos (OT)	4
C3 (Sweden) Frölunda HC	3
30 December
T1 (Czech Republic) HC Dynamo Pardubice	4
C2 Team Canada	3

Final
31 December
C1 (Switzerland) HC Davos	5
T1 (Czech Republic) HC Dynamo Pardubice	3

=== Quarterfinals ===
29 December 2023; 15:10	HC Ambrì-Piotta (Switzerland)	0–5 (0–0, 0–2, 0–3)	(Sweden) Frölunda HC	Eisstadion Davos

Game reference

Janne Juvonen
Goalies
Lars Johansson

0–1	31:17 – Öberg (Künzle)
0–2	39:18 – Friberg (Strömwall, Tömmernes) (PP)
0–3	44:11 – F. Hasa (Innala, Borg)
0–4	45:23 – Innala (Tömmernes, Strömwall) (PP)
0–5	51:11 – Dower Nilsson (Folin, Lasu)

12 min
Penalties
8 min

29 December 2023; 20:15	Team Canada	6–3 (2–0, 1–0, 3–3)	(Finland) KalPa	Eisstadion Davos

Game reference

Aaron Dell
Tyler Beskorowany
Goalies
Juha Jatkola
Stefanos Lekkas

Ang (Grant, Morley) (PP) – 03:48	1–0
Quenneville (LaLeggia) – 05:08	2–0
DiDomenico (Leslie, Audette) (PP) – 38:44	3–0
Hazen (Knight, DiDomenico) – 41:36	4–0
Asselin (Smith, Quenneville) – 42:04	5–0
	5–1	46:09 – Sissons (Räsänen)
	5–2	52:53 – Rissanen (Klemetti, Kapanen)
	5–3	57:34 – Simontaival (Rissanen, Räsänen) (EA)
DiDomenico (Knight) (EN) – 59:18	6–3

4 min
Penalties
8 min

=== Semifinals ===
30 December 2023; 15:10	HC Davos (Switzerland)	4–3 OT (1–1, 2–1, 0–1) (OT: 1–0)	(Sweden) Frölunda HC	Eisstadion Davos

Game reference

Sandro Aeschlimann
Goalies
Lars Johansson

Andersson (Bristedt, Nordström) – 04:14	1–0
	1–1	14:55 – Borg (Halbgewachs, Innala)
	1–2	22:03 – Klingberg (Lasu)
Rasmussen (Haapala, Jung) – 23:33	2–2
Corvi – 35:32	3–2
	3–3	52:56 – Strömwall (Högberg, Innala) (PP)
Haapala – 60:51	4–3

4 min
Penalties
28 min

30 December 2023; 20:15	HC Dynamo Pardubice (Czech Republic)	4–3 (0–0, 1–2, 3–1)	Team Canada	Eisstadion Davos

Game reference

Milan Klouček
Goalies
Aaron Dell

	0–1	20:24 – Hazen (DiDomenico, Benn)
Radil (Košťálek, Kousal) – 24:37	1–1
	1–2	39:58 – Grant (Quenneville, Smith) (PP)
	1–3	42:00 – Grant (SH)
Radil (Čerešňák, Kaut) (PP, EA) – 56:04	2–3
Kaut (Košťálek, Cienciala) (EA) – 58:37	3–3
Paulovič (Zohorna) – 59:21	4–3

14 min
Penalties
47 min

=== Final ===
31 December 2023; 12:10	HC Davos (Switzerland)	5–3 (1–0, 2–2, 2–1)	(Czech Republic) HC Dynamo Pardubice	Eisstadion Davos

Game reference

Sandro Aeschlimann
Goalies
Milan Klouček

Rasmussen (Haapala) – 12:55	1–0
Corvi (Olofsson, Wieser) – 31:17	2–0
	2–1	36:28 – Hyka (Radil, Čerešňák) (PP)
	2–2	36:41 – Kousal (Radil)
Dahlbeck (Wieser, Olofsson) – 38:58	3–2
Rasmussen (Haapala) – 40:31	4–2
Olofsson (Wieser, Corvi) – 42:25	5–2
	5–3	52:09 – Mandát (Pochobradský, Košťálek)

4 min
Penalties
6 min

== All-Star Team ==
Position	Player	Team
Goaltender	(Switzerland) Sandro Aeschlimann	(Switzerland) HC Davos
Defencemen	(Slovakia) Peter Čerešňák	(Czech Republic) HC Dynamo Pardubice
Defencemen	(Canada) Ty Smith	Team Canada
Forwards	(Canada) Alex Formenton	(Switzerland) HC Ambrì-Piotta
Forwards	(Canada) Jonathan Hazen	Team Canada
Forwards	(Sweden) Dennis Rasmussen	(Switzerland) HC Davos

Source: Spengler Cup

== Statistics ==
=== Scoring leaders ===
Pos	Player	Team	GP	G	A	Pts
1	Dennis Rasmussen	HC Davos	4	5	2	7
2	Henrik Haapala	HC Davos	4	2	5	7
3	John Quenneville	Team Canada	4	2	4	6
4	Jonathan Hazen	Team Canada	4	4	1	5
5	Alex Formenton	HC Ambrì-Piotta	3	3	2	5
6	Enzo Corvi	HC Davos	4	2	3	5
6	Lukáš Radil	HC Dynamo Pardubice	4	2	3	5
6	Chris DiDomenico	Team Canada	4	2	3	5
9	Jere Innala	Frölunda HC	4	1	4	5
9	Jesper Olofsson	HC Davos	4	1	4	5
9	Ty Smith	Team Canada	4	1	4	5

GP = Games played; G = Goals; A = Assists; Pts = Points; +/− = Plus–minus; PIM = Penalties In Minutes
Source: eliteprospects.com

=== Goaltending leaders ===
(minimum 40% team's total ice time)

Pos	Player	Team	TOI	GA	GAA	SA	Sv%	SO
1	Lars Johansson	Frölunda HC	181	7	2.33	80	91.25	1
2	Aaron Dell	Team Canada	186	8	2.58	85	90.59	1
3	Sandro Aeschlimann	HC Davos	180	7	2.33	65	89.23	0
4	Stefanos Lekkas	KalPa	75	4	3.23	37	89.19	0
5	Janne Juvonen	HC Ambrì-Piotta	122	8	3.96	65	87.69	0

TOI = Time on ice (minutes:seconds); GA = Goals against; GAA = Goals against average; SA = Shots against; Sv% = Save percentage; SO = Shutouts
Source: eliteprospects.com
