= 2022–23 SHL season =

- League: Swedish Hockey League
- Sport: Ice hockey
- Duration: 17 September 2022 – 9 March 2023; (Regular season); 11 March – 24 April 2023; (Playoffs)

Regular season
- First place: Växjö Lakers
- Top scorer: Antti Suomela (IK Oskarshamn)
- Relegated to HockeyAllsvenskan: Brynäs IF

Playoffs
- Playoffs MVP: Emil Larmi (Växjö Lakers)
- Finals champions: Växjö Lakers
- Runners-up: Skellefteå AIK

SHL seasons
- ← 2021–22 2023–24 →

The 2022–23 SHL season was the 48th season of the Swedish Hockey League (SHL). The regular season began on 17 September 2022 and ended on 9 March 2023, where it was then followed by the playoffs and the relegation playoffs.

The Växjö Lakers completed their second league and playoff double in three seasons; having finished three points clear of Skellefteå AIK after the 52-game regular season, the two teams met again in the playoff final with the Lakers prevailing 4–1 in the best-of-seven series.

== Teams ==
SHL team map

The league consists of 14 teams; HV71 returned to the SHL after one season in the HockeyAllsvenskan, where they won the 2021–22 title. Djurgårdens IF were relegated to the HockeyAllsvenskan at the end of the previous season, and as a result, Stockholm was not represented by a top-division team for the first time. In the end of the season, Brynäs was relegated for the first time ever, leaving Färjestad as the only team to have played every season in the league since it was founded.

Team	City	Arena	Capacity
Brynäs IF	Gävle	Monitor ERP Arena	7,909
Frölunda HC	Gothenburg	Scandinavium	12,044
Färjestad BK	Karlstad	Löfbergs Arena	8,647
HV71	Jönköping	Husqvarna Garden	7,000
Leksands IF	Leksand	Tegera Arena	7,650
Linköping HC	Linköping	Saab Arena	8,500
Luleå HF	Luleå	Coop Norrbotten Arena	6,300
Malmö Redhawks	Malmö	Malmö Arena	13,000
IK Oskarshamn	Oskarshamn	Be-Ge Hockey Center	3,275
Rögle BK	Ängelholm	Catena Arena	5,150
Skellefteå AIK	Skellefteå	Skellefteå Kraft Arena	6,001
Timrå IK	Timrå	NHC Arena	6,000
Växjö Lakers	Växjö	Vida Arena	5,700
Örebro HK	Örebro	Behrn Arena	5,150

== Regular season ==
Each team played 52 games, playing each of the other thirteen teams four times: twice on home ice, and twice away from home. Points were awarded for each game, where three points were awarded for winning in regulation time, two points for winning in overtime or shootout, one point for losing in overtime or shootout, and zero points for losing in regulation time. At the end of the regular season, the team that finished with the most points was crowned the league champion.

=== Standings ===
Pos	Team	Pld	W	OTW	OTL	L	GF	GA	GD	Pts	Qualification
1	Växjö Lakers	52	27	7	7	11	153	111	+42	102	Qualification to Quarter-finals
2	Skellefteå AIK	52	27	6	6	13	165	118	+47	99	Qualification to Quarter-finals
3	Färjestad BK	52	24	7	4	17	154	139	+15	90	Qualification to Quarter-finals
4	Örebro HK	52	21	7	6	18	155	141	+14	83	Qualification to Quarter-finals
5	Timrå IK	52	22	6	3	21	137	130	+7	81	Qualification to Quarter-finals
6	Frölunda HC	52	21	5	8	18	140	139	+1	81	Qualification to Quarter-finals
7	IK Oskarshamn	52	20	8	2	22	165	159	+6	78	Qualification to Eighth-finals
8	Leksands IF	52	22	5	1	24	131	136	−5	77	Qualification to Eighth-finals
9	Rögle BK	52	17	8	5	22	149	158	−9	72	Qualification to Eighth-finals
10	Luleå HF	52	18	4	9	21	117	130	−13	71	Qualification to Eighth-finals
11	HV71	52	15	7	9	21	138	151	−13	68	
12	Linköping HC	52	16	4	11	21	133	165	−32	67	
13	Brynäs IF (R)	52	16	4	6	26	134	171	−37	62	Qualification to Play Out
14	Malmö Redhawks	52	14	6	7	25	133	156	−23	61	Qualification to Play Out

Source: SHL.se
Rules for classification: 1) Points; 2) Goal difference; 3) Number of goals scored
(R) Relegated

=== Statistics ===
==== Scoring leaders ====
The following shows the top ten players who led the league in points, at the conclusion of the regular season. If two or more skaters are tied (i.e. same number of points, goals and played games), all of the tied skaters are shown.

Player	Team	GP	G	A	Pts	+/–	PIM
(Finland) Antti Suomela	IK Oskarshamn	51	37	29	66	+20	45
(Sweden) Patrik Karlkvist	IK Oskarshamn	52	23	38	61	+11	14
(Canada) Adam Tambellini	Rögle BK	49	23	23	46	–14	14
(Sweden) Jonathan Pudas	Skellefteå AIK	50	11	34	45	+12	28
(Sweden) Oscar Möller	Skellefteå AIK	48	23	21	44	+19	10
(Czech Republic) Jiří Smejkal	IK Oskarshamn	49	23	20	43	+3	30
(Sweden) André Petersson	HV71	47	21	21	42	+3	16
(Sweden) Jonathan Dahlén	Timrå IK	52	20	22	42	+8	20
(Finland) Ahti Oksanen	IK Oskarshamn	52	20	22	42	+17	10
(Latvia) Rodrigo Ābols	Örebro HK	51	19	22	41	–2	12

==== Leading goaltenders ====
The following shows the top ten goaltenders who led the league in goals against average, provided that they had played at least 40% of their team's minutes, at the conclusion of the regular season.

Player	Team	GP	TOI	W	L	GA	SO	Sv%	GAA
(Finland) Emil Larmi	Växjö Lakers	31	1850:58	21	9	50	8	93.35	1.62
(Sweden) Linus Söderström	Skellefteå AIK	30	1690:59	22	7	46	6	92.94	1.63
(Lithuania) Mantas Armalis	Leksands IF	41	2364:12	24	16	86	4	92.07	2.18
(Sweden) Joel Lassinantti	Luleå HF	40	2304:41	16	23	84	6	89.57	2.19
(Sweden) Jacob Johansson	Timrå IK	47	2793:19	24	22	108	4	91.15	2.32
(Sweden) Lars Johansson	Frölunda HC	41	2336:54	19	19	93	3	91.01	2.39
(Sweden) Jhonas Enroth	Örebro HK	37	2238:12	22	15	93	2	90.54	2.49
(Sweden) Adam Åhman	Växjö Lakers	22	1297:20	13	9	54	2	89.51	2.50
(Canada) Matt Tomkins	Färjestad BK	32	1917:37	20	12	81	2	91.15	2.53
(Sweden) Tim Juel	IK Oskarshamn	32	1915:26	18	13	83	2	92.14	2.60

== Playoffs ==
Ten teams qualify for the playoffs: the top six teams in the regular season have a bye to the quarterfinals, while teams ranked seventh to tenth meet each other (7 versus 10, 8 versus 9) in a preliminary playoff round.

=== Format ===
In the first round, the 7th-ranked team meets the 10th-ranked team and the 8th-ranked team meets the 9th-ranked team for a place in the second round. In the second round, the top-ranked team will meet the lowest-ranked winner of the first round, the second-ranked team will face the other winner of the first round, the third-ranked team will face the sixth-ranked team, and the fourth-ranked team will face the fifth-ranked team. In the third round, the highest remaining seed is matched against the lowest remaining seed. In each round the higher-seeded team is awarded home advantage. The meetings are in the first round played as best-of-three series, and in the later rounds as best-of-seven series. In the eighth-finals, the higher-seeded teams play at home for game 2 (plus 3 if necessary) while the lower-seeded teams play at home for game 1. In the later rounds, the higher-seeded teams are at home for games 1 and 3 (plus 5 and 7 if necessary) while the lower-seeded teams are at home for games 2 and 4 (plus 6 if necessary).

=== Playoff bracket ===
Eighth-finals; Swedish: Åttondelsfinal
7	IK Oskarshamn	1
10	Luleå HF	2
8	Leksands IF	1
9	Rögle BK	2

Quarter-finals; Swedish: Kvartsfinal
1	Växjö Lakers	4
10	Luleå HF	3
2	Skellefteå AIK	4
9	Rögle BK	2
3	Färjestad BK	3
6	Frölunda HC	4
4	Örebro HK	4
5	Timrå IK	3

Semi-finals
1	Växjö Lakers	4
6	Frölunda HC	2
(Pairings are re-seeded after the first and second round)
2	Skellefteå AIK	4
4	Örebro HK	2

Finals
1	Växjö Lakers	4
2	Skellefteå AIK	1

=== Eighth-finals ===
==== (7) IK Oskarshamn vs. (10) Luleå HF ====
11 March	Luleå HF	5–4	IK Oskarshamn	Coop Norrbotten Arena	Recap
Brendan Shinnimin (1) – 14:28		First period	6:55 – Antti Suomela (1); 17:52 – Lukas Pilö (1)
Brendan Shinnimin (2) – 8:34; Einar Emanuelsson (1) – 14:39; Brendan Shinnimin (3) – 17:32; Jack Connolly (1; PPG) – 19:39		Second period	5:34 – Jiří Smejkal (1; PPG)
No scoring		Third period	15:54 – Ahti Oksanen (1)
Joel Lassinantti (22 shots / 18 saves)		Goalie stats	Tim Juel (35 shots / 30 saves)

13 March	IK Oskarshamn	4–3	OT	Luleå HF	Be-Ge Hockey Center	Recap
Myles Powell (1) – 6:08		First period		9:37 – Jonathan Andersson (1); 12:33 – Julius Honka (1)
Patrik Karlkvist (1; PPG) – 1:01		Second period		16:14 – Tomi Sallinen (1)
Ahti Oksanen (2) – 10:09		Third period		No scoring
Lukas Pilö (2) – 16:47		First overtime period		No scoring
Tim Juel (32 shots / 29 saves)		Goalie stats		Joel Lassinantti (34 shots / 30 saves)

14 March	IK Oskarshamn	2–3	OT	Luleå HF	Be-Ge Hockey Center	Recap
Antti Suomela (2; PPG) – 12:55		First period		6:21 – Juhani Tyrväinen (1)
No scoring		Second period		10:01 – Erik Gustafsson (1; PPG)
Ahti Oksanen (3) – 13:38		Third period		No scoring
No scoring		First overtime period		4:30 – Joonas Rask (1)
Tim Juel (28 shots / 25 saves)		Goalie stats		Joel Lassinantti (29 shots / 27 saves)

Luleå HF win series 2–1

==== (8) Leksands IF vs. (9) Rögle BK ====
11 March	Rögle BK	1–2	OT	Leksands IF	Catena Arena	Recap
No scoring		First period		3:21 – Matt Caito (1)
Dennis Everberg (1; PPG) – 5:23		Second period		No scoring
No scoring		Third period		No scoring
No scoring		First overtime period		14:21 – Lian Bichsel (1)
Christoffer Rifalk (43 shots / 41 saves)		Goalie stats		Mantas Armalis (28 shots / 27 saves)

13 March	Leksands IF	2–3	Rögle BK	Tegera Arena	Recap
Mikael Ruohomaa (1) – 1:36; Patrik Norén (1; SHG) – 17:36		First period	18:37 – Anton Bengtsson (1; PPG)
No scoring		Second period	9:26 – William Wallinder (1)
No scoring		Third period	9:51 – Linus Sandin (1; SHG)
Mantas Armalis (11 shots / 8 saves)		Goalie stats	Christoffer Rifalk (38 shots / 36 saves)

14 March	Leksands IF	2–4	Rögle BK	Tegera Arena	Recap
Patrik Zackrisson (1) – 6:36		First period	13:25 – Adam Engström (1); 17:24 – Linus Sandin (2)
No scoring		Second period	6:20 – Tony Sund (1)
Matt Caito (2) – 15:37		Third period	18:55 – Brady Ferguson (1; PPG/ENG)
Mantas Armalis (21 shots / 18 saves)		Goalie stats	Christoffer Rifalk (39 shots / 37 saves)

Rögle BK win series 2–1

=== Quarter-finals ===
==== (1) Växjö Lakers vs. (10) Luleå HF ====
16 March	Växjö Lakers	2–0	Luleå HF	Vida Arena	Recap
No scoring		First period	No scoring
Joel Persson (1; PPG) – 10:13		Second period	No scoring
Ludvig Nilsson (1; ENG) – 19:18		Third period	No scoring
Emil Larmi (9 shots / 9 saves)		Goalie stats	Joel Lassinantti (29 shots / 28 saves)

18 March	Luleå HF	1–0	Växjö Lakers	Coop Norrbotten Arena	Recap
No scoring		First period	No scoring
Joonas Rask (2) – 19:00		Second period	No scoring
No scoring		Third period	No scoring
Joel Lassinantti (13 shots / 13 saves)		Goalie stats	Emil Larmi (16 shots / 15 saves)

20 March	Växjö Lakers	7–2	Luleå HF	Vida Arena	Recap
No scoring		First period	No scoring
Hardy Häman Aktell (1) – 3:09; Tobias Rieder (1) – 15:20; Kalle Kossila (1) – 15:58		Second period	6:06 – Brendan Shinnimin (4)
Robert Rosén (1; PPG) – 4:49; Joachim Blichfeld (1) – 5:42; Jayden Halbgewachs (1; PPG) – 9:18; Joel Persson (2; PPG) – 10:53		Third period	1:31 – Julius Honka (2)
Emil Larmi (18 shots / 16 saves)		Goalie stats	Joel Lassinantti (35 shots / 29 saves); Matteus Ward (7 shots / 6 saves)

22 March	Luleå HF	2–3	OT	Växjö Lakers	Coop Norrbotten Arena	Recap
No scoring		First period		No scoring
Brendan Shinnimin (5) – 1:58; Juhani Tyrväinen (2) – 7:00		Second period		5:31 – Kalle Kossila (2)
No scoring		Third period		17:08 – Kalle Kossila (3; PPG)
No scoring		First overtime period		1:25 – Hardy Häman Aktell (2)
Joel Lassinantti (24 shots / 21 saves)		Goalie stats		Emil Larmi (20 shots / 18 saves)

24 March	Växjö Lakers	0–1	Luleå HF	Vida Arena	Recap
No scoring		First period	No scoring
No scoring		Second period	No scoring
No scoring		Third period	7:13 – Jonas Berglund (1)
Emil Larmi (18 shots / 17 saves)		Goalie stats	Joel Lassinantti (32 shots / 32 saves)

26 March	Luleå HF	2–1	Växjö Lakers	Coop Norrbotten Arena	Recap
Filip Pyrochta (1) – 5:36; Juhani Tyrväinen (3; PPG) – 9:55		First period	3:41 – Martin Lundberg (1)
No scoring		Second period	No scoring
No scoring		Third period	No scoring
Joel Lassinantti (21 shots / 20 saves)		Goalie stats	Emil Larmi (22 shots / 20 saves)

28 March	Växjö Lakers	2–1	Luleå HF	Vida Arena	Recap
Joachim Blichfeld (2) – 17:58		First period	18:24 – Niklas Olausson (1)
Robert Rosén (2; PPG) – 6:58		Second period	No scoring
No scoring		Third period	No scoring
Emil Larmi (14 shots / 13 saves)		Goalie stats	Joel Lassinantti (23 shots / 21 saves)

Växjö Lakers win series 4–3

==== (2) Skellefteå AIK vs. (9) Rögle BK ====
16 March	Skellefteå AIK	2–3	Rögle BK	Skellefteå Kraft Arena	Recap
No scoring		First period	1:02 – Dennis Everberg (2)
Filip Sandberg (1; PPG) – 19:42		Second period	No scoring
Jonathan Johnson (1; EA) – 16:59		Third period	9:15 – Adam Engström (2); 16:26 – Adam Edström (1)
Linus Söderström (20 shots / 17 saves)		Goalie stats	Christoffer Rifalk (37 shots / 35 saves)

18 March	Rögle BK	0–2	Skellefteå AIK	Catena Arena	Recap
No scoring		First period	No scoring
No scoring		Second period	No scoring
No scoring		Third period	10:05 – Jonathan Johnson (2); 18:05 – Albin Sundsvik (1)
Christoffer Rifalk (30 shots / 28 saves)		Goalie stats	Linus Söderström (17 shots / 17 saves)

20 March	Skellefteå AIK	5–0	Rögle BK	Skellefteå Kraft Arena	Recap
Oscar Möller (1) – 3:32; Joakim Lindström (1) – 4:51		First period	No scoring
No scoring		Second period	No scoring
Max Lindholm (1) – 9:55; Linus Lindström (1; SHG/ENG) – 12:31; Albin Sundsvik (2) – 19:35		Third period	No scoring
Linus Söderström (21 shots / 21 saves)		Goalie stats	Christoffer Rifalk (31 shots / 27 saves)

22 March	Rögle BK	5–2	Skellefteå AIK	Catena Arena	Recap
Adam Engström (3) – 14:11		First period	15:43 – Måns Forsfjäll (1)
Oskar Stål Lyrenäs (1; PPG) – 10:28		Second period	14:44 – Oscar Möller (2)
Linus Sandin (3) – 5:55; Adam Edström (2; ENG) – 18:21; Ludvig Larsson (1; ENG) – 18:50		Third period	No scoring
Christoffer Rifalk (27 shots / 25 saves)		Goalie stats	Frans Tuohimaa (15 shots / 12 saves)

24 March	Skellefteå AIK	3–2	OT	Rögle BK	Skellefteå Kraft Arena	Recap
No scoring		First period		19:46 – Anton Bengtsson (2; PPG)
No scoring		Second period		2:59 – Simon Hjalmarsson (1)
Albin Sundsvik (3; SHG) – 8:39; Jonathan Pudas (1; PPG) – 12:03		Third period		No scoring
Filip Sandberg (2) – 9:44		First overtime period		No scoring
Linus Söderström (20 shots / 18 saves)		Goalie stats		Christoffer Rifalk (48 shots / 45 saves)

26 March	Rögle BK	1–5	Skellefteå AIK	Catena Arena	Recap
No scoring		First period	6:02 – Joakim Lindström (2)
Oskar Stål Lyrenäs (2; PPG) – 7:33		Second period	5:27 – Jonathan Pudas (2; PPG)
No scoring		Third period	1:47 – Oscar Möller (3); 8:43 – Oscar Möller (4); 16:33 – Tom Kühnhackl (1)
Christoffer Rifalk (31 shots / 26 saves)		Goalie stats	Linus Söderström (23 shots / 22 saves)

Skellefteå AIK win series 4–2

==== (3) Färjestad BK vs. (6) Frölunda HC ====
17 March	Färjestad BK	3–2	Frölunda HC	Löfbergs Arena	Recap
Lucas Forsell (1) – 2:54		First period	15:38 – Joel Lundqvist (1; PPG)
Joakim Nygård (1; PPG) – 17:31		Second period	10:19 – Mats Rosseli Olsen (1)
Lucas Forsell (2) – 3:04		Third period	No scoring
Matt Tomkins (26 shots / 24 saves)		Goalie stats	Frederik Dichow (28 shots / 25 saves)

19 March	Frölunda HC	3–2	Färjestad BK	Scandinavium	Recap
No scoring		First period	4:50 – Marcus Nilsson (1)
Jere Innala (1; PPG) – 4:49; Loui Eriksson (1) – 14:09		Second period	No scoring
Loui Eriksson (2) – 14:53		Third period	11:44 – Joel Nyström (1)
Lars Johansson (23 shots / 21 saves)		Goalie stats	Matt Tomkins (45 shots / 42 saves)

21 March	Färjestad BK	3–1	Frölunda HC	Löfbergs Arena	Recap
No scoring		First period	1:28 – Anthony Greco (1)
Linus Johansson (1) – 13:15; Michael Lindqvist (1) – 14:15		Second period	No scoring
August Tornberg (1) – 12:11		Third period	No scoring
Matt Tomkins (19 shots / 18 saves)		Goalie stats	Lars Johansson (38 shots / 35 saves)

23 March	Frölunda HC	5–0	Färjestad BK	Scandinavium	Recap
Patrik Carlsson (1) – 6:24		First period	No scoring
Filip Johansson (1; PPG) – 3:09; Mats Rosseli Olsen (2) – 6:52		Second period	No scoring
Loui Eriksson (3) – 5:00; Filip Hasa (1) – 8:07		Third period	No scoring
Lars Johansson (21 shots / 21 saves)		Goalie stats	Matt Tomkins (17 shots / 12 saves); Dennis Hildeby (5 shots / 5 saves)

25 March	Färjestad BK	1–2	Frölunda HC	Löfbergs Arena	Recap
Joel Nyström (2; PPG) – 13:54		First period	No scoring
No scoring		Second period	7:30 – Anthony Greco (2)
No scoring		Third period	9:46 – Jacob Nilsson (1)
Matt Tomkins (27 shots / 25 saves)		Goalie stats	Lars Johansson (21 shots / 20 saves)

27 March	Frölunda HC	2–4	Färjestad BK	Scandinavium	Recap
No scoring		First period	6:13 – Henrik Björklund (1)
Linus Nässén (1) – 11:04		Second period	2:22 – Daniel Viksten (1)
Jere Innala (2) – 9:32		Third period	12:07 – Mattias Göransson (1); 18:27 – Victor Ejdsell (1; ENG)
Lars Johansson (22 shots / 19 saves)		Goalie stats	Matt Tomkins (32 shots / 30 saves)

29 March	Färjestad BK	1–3	Frölunda HC	Löfbergs Arena	Recap
No scoring		First period	3:03 – Filip Hasa (2); 6:07 – Filip Johansson (2)
Brandon Davidson (1) – 12:53		Second period	No scoring
No scoring		Third period	4:10 – Erik Borg (1)
Matt Tomkins (24 shots / 21 saves)		Goalie stats	Lars Johansson (28 shots / 27 saves)

Frölunda HC win series 4–3

==== (4) Örebro HK vs. (5) Timrå IK ====
17 March	Örebro HK	4–1	Timrå IK	Behrn Arena	Recap
Oliver Eklind (1) – 5:01; Oliver Eklind (2) – 7:15		First period	No scoring
Rasmus Rissanen (1) – 6:42		Second period	1:04 – Joonas Lyytinen (1)
Milton Oscarson (1; ENG) – 18:09		Third period	No scoring
Jhonas Enroth (22 shots / 21 saves)		Goalie stats	Jacob Johansson (29 shots / 26 saves)

19 March	Timrå IK	3–4	Örebro HK	NHC Arena	Recap
Elmeri Eronen (1) – 3:20		First period	No scoring
Emil Pettersson (1; PPG) – 17:55		Second period	9:11 – William Wikman (1); 11:29 – Filip Berglund (1; PPG)
Jakob Stenqvist (1; PPG) – 6:31		Third period	11:54 – Marcus Hardegård (1); 17:05 – Linus Öberg (1)
Jacob Johansson (25 shots / 21 saves)		Goalie stats	Jhonas Enroth (32 shots / 29 saves)

21 March	Örebro HK	3–4	2OT	Timrå IK	Behrn Arena	Recap
Linus Öberg (2) – 14:40		First period		16:17 – Jonathan Dahlén (1)
Rasmus Rissanen (2) – 5:33; Marcus Hardegård (2) – 16:58		Second period		No scoring
No scoring		Third period		0:27 – Elmeri Eronen (2; PPG); 13:59 – Elmeri Eronen (3)
No scoring		Second overtime period		1:39 – Jonathan Dahlén (2)
Jhonas Enroth (34 shots / 30 saves)		Goalie stats		Jacob Johansson (39 shots / 36 saves)

23 March	Timrå IK	2–4	Örebro HK	NHC Arena	Recap
Sebastian Hartmann (1; PPG) – 18:55		First period	10:02 – Oliver Eklind (3); 13:12 – Marcus Hardegård (3)
Magnus Pääjärvi (1) – 15:00		Second period	2:33 – Linus Öberg (3; PPG); 14:09 – Philip Holm (1; PPG)
No scoring		Third period	No scoring
Jacob Johansson (22 shots / 18 saves)		Goalie stats	Jonas Arntzen (31 shots / 29 saves)

25 March	Örebro HK	2–3	OT	Timrå IK	Behrn Arena	Recap
Emil Larsson (1; PPG) – 14:04		First period		7:46 – Emil Pettersson (2)
Filip Berglund (2; PPG) – 12:44		Second period		No scoring
No scoring		Third period		3:07 – Anton Lander (1; PPG)
No scoring		First overtime period		2:39 – Joonas Lyytinen (2)
Jhonas Enroth (23 shots / 20 saves)		Goalie stats		Jacob Johansson (36 shots / 34 saves)

27 March	Timrå IK	4–3	Örebro HK	NHC Arena	Recap
Sebastian Hartmann (2) – 10:58		First period	13:00 – Filip Berglund (3)
Anton Lander (2) – 7:51		Second period	13:13 – Rasmus Rissanen (3)
Emil Pettersson (3; PPG) – 10:56; Sebastian Hartmann (3; ENG) – 18:43		Third period	19:58 – Kristian Näkyvä (1; EA)
Jacob Johansson (22 shots / 19 saves)		Goalie stats	Jhonas Enroth (33 shots / 30 saves)

29 March	Örebro HK	3–2	Timrå IK	Behrn Arena	Recap
Linus Öberg (4; PPG) – 9:10		First period	No scoring
Oliver Eklind (4) – 6:28; Milton Oscarson (2) – 10:18		Second period	No scoring
No scoring		Third period	1:48 – Jakob Stenqvist (2); 12:52 – Anton Lander (3; PPG)
Jhonas Enroth (23 shots / 21 saves)		Goalie stats	Jacob Johansson (22 shots / 19 saves)

Örebro HK win series 4–3

=== Semi-finals ===
==== (1) Växjö Lakers vs. (6) Frölunda HC ====
31 March	Växjö Lakers	6–2	Frölunda HC	Vida Arena	Recap
Martin Lundberg (2) – 12:30		First period	15:00 – Anthony Greco (3)
Lukas Bengtsson (1) – 3:08		Second period	1:29 – Anthony Greco (4)
Jayden Halbgewachs (2) – 5:24; Joachim Blichfeld (2; PPG) – 12:36; Manuel Ågren (1; ENG) – 16:26; Victor Stjernborg (1; ENG) – 18:09		Third period	No scoring
Emil Larmi (22 shots / 20 saves)		Goalie stats	Lars Johansson (25 shots / 21 saves)

2 April	Frölunda HC	4–2	Växjö Lakers	Scandinavium	Recap
No scoring		First period	6:38 – Dan Sexton (1)
Loui Eriksson (4) – 12:46; Ryan Lasch (1) – 17:40		Second period	19:51 – Glenn Gustafsson (1)
Filip Hasa (3; PPG) – 12:03; Linus Nässén (2) – 16:45		Third period	No scoring
Lars Johansson (32 shots / 30 saves)		Goalie stats	Emil Larmi (24 shots / 20 saves)

4 April	Växjö Lakers	0–1	Frölunda HC	Vida Arena	Recap
No scoring		First period	5:14 – Ryan Lasch (2)
No scoring		Second period	No scoring
No scoring		Third period	No scoring
Emil Larmi (15 shots / 14 saves)		Goalie stats	Lars Johansson (27 shots / 27 saves)

6 April	Frölunda HC	0–2	Växjö Lakers	Scandinavium	Recap
No scoring		First period	2:56 – Erik Josefsson (1)
No scoring		Second period	12:11 – Joachim Blichfeld (4)
No scoring		Third period	No scoring
Lars Johansson (22 shots / 20 saves)		Goalie stats	Emil Larmi (27 shots / 27 saves)

8 April	Växjö Lakers	3–2	Frölunda HC	Vida Arena	Recap
Tobias Rieder (2) – 6:23		First period	16:01 – Jacob Nilsson (2; PPG)
No scoring		Second period	4:22 – Filip Hasa (4)
Manuel Ågren (2) – 3:44; Victor Stjernborg (2) – 5:49		Third period	No scoring
Emil Larmi (26 shots / 24 saves)		Goalie stats	Lars Johansson (27 shots / 24 saves)

10 April	Frölunda HC	1–2	OT	Växjö Lakers	Scandinavium	Recap
No scoring		First period		No scoring
Max Friberg (1) – 13:19		Second period		No scoring
No scoring		Third period		9:50 – Manuel Ågren (3)
No scoring		First overtime period		11:57 – Robert Rosén (3)
Lars Johansson (32 shots / 30 saves)		Goalie stats		Emil Larmi (26 shots / 25 saves)

Växjö Lakers win series 4–2

==== (2) Skellefteå AIK vs. (4) Örebro HK ====
1 April	Skellefteå AIK	2–5	Örebro HK	Skellefteå Kraft Arena	Recap
Oskar Nilsson (1) – 13:26		First period	19:46 – Rasmus Rissanen (4)
Oscar Möller (5; PPG) – 4:34		Second period	9:38 – Leo Carlsson (1)
No scoring		Third period	14:23 – Linus Öberg (5); 18:25 – Robert Leino (1; ENG); 18:50 – William Wikman (2; ENG)
Linus Söderström (22 shots / 19 saves)		Goalie stats	Jhonas Enroth (25 shots / 23 saves)

3 April	Örebro HK	3–2	OT	Skellefteå AIK	Behrn Arena	Recap
Filip Berglund (4) – 15:36; Milton Oscarson (3) – 18:11		First period		No scoring
No scoring		Second period		No scoring
No scoring		Third period		4:01 – Tom Kühnhackl (2); 8:49 – Jonathan Johnson (3)
Mathias Bromé (1) – 2:41		First overtime period		No scoring
Jhonas Enroth (26 shots / 24 saves)		Goalie stats		Linus Söderström (28 shots / 25 saves)

5 April	Skellefteå AIK	3–0	Örebro HK	Skellefteå Kraft Arena	Recap
No scoring		First period	No scoring
Pär Lindholm (1) – 9:17; Andreas Wingerli (1) – 17:12		Second period	No scoring
Filip Sandberg (3; ENG) – 18:57		Third period	No scoring
Linus Söderström (27 shots / 27 saves)		Goalie stats	Jhonas Enroth (30 shots / 28 saves)

7 April	Örebro HK	0–1	Skellefteå AIK	Behrn Arena	Recap
No scoring		First period	No scoring
No scoring		Second period	14:42 – Elias Salomonsson (1)
No scoring		Third period	No scoring
Jhonas Enroth (30 shots / 29 saves)		Goalie stats	Linus Söderström (17 shots / 17 saves)

9 April	Skellefteå AIK	3–2	2OT	Örebro HK	Skellefteå Kraft Arena	Recap
Max Lindholm (2) – 10:14		First period		4:56 – Milton Oscarson (4)
Linus Högberg (1; PPG) – 19:56		Second period		16:17 – Robert Leino (2; PPG)
No scoring		Third period		No scoring
Jonathan Pudas (3; PPG) – 0:40		Second overtime period		No scoring
Linus Söderström (30 shots / 28 saves)		Goalie stats		Jhonas Enroth (53 shots / 50 saves)

11 April	Örebro HK	0–1	Skellefteå AIK	Behrn Arena	Recap
No scoring		First period	No scoring
No scoring		Second period	19:45 – Jonathan Johnson (4)
No scoring		Third period	No scoring
Jhonas Enroth (18 shots / 17 saves)		Goalie stats	Linus Söderström (17 shots / 17 saves)

Skellefteå AIK win series 4–2

=== Finals ===
==== (1) Växjö Lakers vs. (2) Skellefteå AIK ====
15 April	Växjö Lakers	3–2	2OT	Skellefteå AIK	Vida Arena	Recap
No scoring		First period		14:51 – Jonathan Johnson (5; PPG); 16:02 – Linus Högberg (2)
Glenn Gustafsson (2) – 6:22; Joachim Blichfeld (5) – 9:11		Second period		No scoring
No scoring		Third period		No scoring
Keegan Lowe (1) – 16:06		Second overtime period		No scoring
Emil Larmi (34 shots / 32 saves)		Goalie stats		Linus Söderström (37 shots / 34 saves)

17 April	Skellefteå AIK	0–1	Växjö Lakers	Skellefteå Kraft Arena	Recap
No scoring		First period	12:55 – Dan Sexton (2)
No scoring		Second period	No scoring
No scoring		Third period	No scoring
Linus Söderström (11 shots / 10 saves)		Goalie stats	Emil Larmi (26 shots / 26 saves)

20 April	Växjö Lakers	2–3	2OT	Skellefteå AIK	Vida Arena	Recap
No scoring		First period		No scoring
No scoring		Second period		No scoring
Dan Sexton (3) – 11:39; Joel Kellman (1) – 16:25		Third period		7:57 – Pär Lindholm (2); 17:32 – Oscar Möller (6; PPG)
No scoring		Second overtime period		10:29 – Simon Robertsson (1)
Emil Larmi (40 shots / 37 saves)		Goalie stats		Linus Söderström (30 shots / 28 saves)

22 April	Skellefteå AIK	1–4	Växjö Lakers	Skellefteå Kraft Arena	Recap
No scoring		First period	11:07 – Keegan Lowe (2); 13:06 – Hardy Häman Aktell (3)
Oscar Möller (7; PPG) – 18:02		Second period	3:41 – Joel Kellman (2)
No scoring		Third period	2:50 – Joel Kellman (3; PPG)
Linus Söderström (30 shots / 26 saves)		Goalie stats	Emil Larmi (28 shots / 27 saves)

24 April	Växjö Lakers	3–0	Skellefteå AIK	Vida Arena	Recap
No scoring		First period	No scoring
Robert Rosén (4) – 19:54		Second period	No scoring
Victor Stjernborg (3; ENG) – 18:23; Ludvig Nilsson (2; ENG) – 19:01		Third period	No scoring
Emil Larmi (18 shots / 18 saves)		Goalie stats	Linus Söderström (18 shots / 17 saves)

Växjö Lakers win series 4–1

=== Statistics ===
==== Scoring leaders ====
The following players led the league in points, at the conclusion of the playoffs. If two or more skaters are tied (i.e. same number of points, goals and played games), all of the tied skaters are shown.

Player	Team	GP	G	A	Pts	+/–	PIM
(Sweden) Jonathan Pudas	Skellefteå AIK	17	3	9	12	+6	12
(Sweden) Rickard Hugg	Skellefteå AIK	16	0	12	12	+2	6
(Sweden) Oscar Möller	Skellefteå AIK	17	7	4	11	+5	0
(Sweden) Linus Öberg	Örebro HK	13	5	6	11	+6	10
(Sweden) Jonathan Dahlén	Timrå IK	7	2	8	10	0	2
(Sweden) Robert Rosén	Växjö Lakers	18	4	5	9	+3	2
(Sweden) Leo Carlsson	Örebro HK	13	1	8	9	+8	4
(Sweden) Lukas Bengtsson	Växjö Lakers	18	1	8	9	+7	2
(Sweden) Jonathan Johnson	Skellefteå AIK	15	5	3	8	+4	4
(Denmark) Joachim Blichfeld	Växjö Lakers	18	5	3	8	+2	0

==== Leading goaltenders ====
The following shows the top five goaltenders who led the league in goals against average, provided that they have played at least 40% of their team's minutes, at the conclusion of the playoffs.

Player	Team	GP	TOI	W	L	GA	SO	Sv%	GAA
(Finland) Emil Larmi	Växjö Lakers	18	1150:09	12	6	25	4	93.80	1.30
(Sweden) Linus Söderström	Skellefteå AIK	16	1048:14	9	7	25	5	93.21	1.43
(Sweden) Lars Johansson	Frölunda HC	12	725:10	6	6	23	2	92.77	1.90
(Sweden) Jhonas Enroth	Örebro HK	12	762:08	5	7	27	0	92.26	2.13
(Lithuania) Mantas Armalis	Leksands IF	3	189:48	1	2	7	0	88.33	2.21

== Play Out ==
The two bottom-placed teams from the regular season played a best-of-seven series, with the winner remaining in the SHL and the loser relegated to the second tier, the HockeyAllsvenskan. The higher-seeded team held home advantage over the series, playing at home for the odd-numbered games while the lower-seeded team was at home for the even-numbered games.

Brynäs IF's defeat in the series ended their 63-year run in the Swedish top flight.

14 March	Brynäs IF	2–5	Malmö Redhawks	Monitor ERP Arena	Recap
Greg Scott (1; PPG) – 5:43		First period	9:02 – Fredrik Händemark (1)
Hannes Björninen (1) – 18:19		Second period	6:05 – Oliver Lauridsen (1); 6:28 – Fredrik Händemark (2)
No scoring		Third period	10:56 – Lukas Wernblom (1); 18:10 – Lukas Wernblom (2; ENG)
Juho Olkinuora (18 shots / 14 saves)		Goalie stats	Adam Werner (32 shots / 30 saves)

16 March	Malmö Redhawks	5–2	Brynäs IF	Malmö Arena	Recap
Matias Lassen (1) – 6:44; Lukas Wernblom (3) – 9:59		First period	2:38 – Greg Scott (2); 5:38 – Johan Larsson (1)
Adam Ollas Mattsson (1) – 17:03		Second period	No scoring
Marcus Sylvegård (1; PPG) – 8:12; Anton Wahlberg (1; ENG) – 17:25		Third period	No scoring
Adam Werner (23 shots / 21 saves)		Goalie stats	Anders Lindbäck (26 shots / 22 saves)

18 March	Brynäs IF	3–4	Malmö Redhawks	Monitor ERP Arena	Recap
Oscar Eklind (1) – 13:53		First period	No scoring
Nick Olesen (1) – 14:49		Second period	11:03 – Nuutti Viitasalo (1); 13:19 – Adam Ollas Mattsson (2; PPG); 18:49 – Adam Ollas Mattsson (3)
Johan Larsson (2) – 15:06		Third period	18:36 – Adam Ollas Mattsson (4)
Anders Lindbäck (16 shots / 12 saves)		Goalie stats	Adam Werner (35 shots / 32 saves)

21 March	Malmö Redhawks	3–4	2OT	Brynäs IF	Malmö Arena	Recap
Lukas Wernblom (4) – 4:17		First period		11:09 – Linus Ölund (1; PPG); 15:09 – Oula Palve (1); 17:01 – Linus Ölund (2; PPG)
Johan Olofsson (1) – 3:13; Pathrik Westerholm (1) – 8:41		Second period		No scoring
No scoring		Third period		No scoring
No scoring		Second overtime period		6:16 – Greg Scott (3)
Adam Werner (46 shots / 42 saves)		Goalie stats		Juho Olkinuora (46 shots / 43 saves)

23 March	Brynäs IF	0–1	Malmö Redhawks	Monitor ERP Arena	Recap
No scoring		First period	No scoring
No scoring		Second period	No scoring
No scoring		Third period	7:07 – Ponthus Westerholm (1)
Juho Olkinuora (21 shots / 20 saves)		Goalie stats	Brandon Maxwell (31 shots / 31 saves)

Malmö Redhawks win series 4–1

== SHL awards ==
Award	Winner(s)
Guldhjälmen	Antti Suomela (IK Oskarshamn)
Guldpucken	
Honken Trophy	Linus Söderström (Skellefteå AIK)
Håkan Loob Trophy	Antti Suomela (IK Oskarshamn)
Rookie of the Year	Filip Bystedt (Linköping HC)
Salming Trophy	Jonathan Pudas (Skellefteå AIK)
Stefan Liv Memorial Trophy	Emil Larmi (Växjö Lakers)
Guldpipan	Linus Öhlund
