= Stenqvist =

Stenqvist is a Swedish surname. Notable people with the surname include:

- Åke Stenqvist (1914–2006), Swedish sprint runner, long jumper, pentathlete, and handball player
- Harry Stenqvist (1893–1968), American-born Swedish road racing cyclist
- Jakob Stenqvist (born 1998), Swedish ice hockey player
