= Matt Tomkins =

Canadian ice hockey player (born 1994)

- Born: June 19, 1994 (age 32) Edmonton, Alberta, Canada
- Height: 6 ft 4 in (193 cm)
- Weight: 198 lb (90 kg; 14 st 2 lb)
- Position: Goaltender
- Catches: Left
- NHL team (P) Cur. team Former teams: Edmonton Oilers; Bakersfield Condors (AHL); Frölunda HC; Färjestad BK; Tampa Bay Lightning
- National team: Canada
- NHL draft: 199th overall, 2012; Chicago Blackhawks
- Playing career: 2017–present

Matthew Tomkins (born June 19, 1994) is a Canadian professional ice hockey player who is a goaltender for the Bakersfield Condors of the American Hockey League (AHL) while under contract to the Edmonton Oilers of the National Hockey League (NHL).

== Playing career ==
Tomkins played junior hockey in the Alberta Junior Hockey League (AJHL) for two seasons (2011–2013). He was selected in the 2012 NHL entry draft by the Chicago Blackhawks. After junior career, Tomkins committed to the Ohio State University and played for their Buckeyes ice hockey team. After graduation Tomkins signed a one-year contract with the Rockford IceHogs of the American Hockey League (AHL), the affiliates of the Chicago Blackhawks, on June 27, 2017. He later signed one-year contract extensions with Rockford in 2018 and 2019. On January 23, 2020, Tomkins signed a two-year, two-way contract with the Chicago Blackhawks and was assigned back to Rockford.

However, Tomkins left North America and signed a one-year contract with Frölunda HC of the Swedish Hockey League (SHL) on May 28, 2021. On June 2, 2022, he signed a one-year contract with Färjestad BK of the SHL.

Tomkins returned to North America following the 2022–23 SHL season and May 10, 2023, he was signed as a free agent to a two-year, two-way contract with the Tampa Bay Lightning. Tomkins made his NHL debut with the Lightning on October 15, in a 5–2 loss to the Ottawa Senators where he made 33 saves. Later during the 2023–24 season, on November 7, 11 years after he was drafted, Tomkins picked up his first NHL career win in a 5–3 victory over the Montreal Canadiens.

Spending the 2024–25 season with the Syracuse Crunch in the AHL, Tomkins was a co-recipient of the Harry "Hap" Holmes Memorial Award, the Crunch and the Laval Rocket having tied for the fewest goals allowed in the league. He had a 12–10–4 record in 26 appearances with the Crunch, with a 2.55 goals against average, a .907 save percentage and three shutouts.

Tomkins left the Lightning organization following two seasons, and was signed as a free agent to a two-year, two-way contract with the Edmonton Oilers on July 1, 2025. Tomkins won his first start in two years on November 1, 2026, making 27 saves in a 4–1 victory against the New York Rangers.

== International play ==
Medal record

Ice hockey

Representing Canada

World Championships
Silver medal – second place	2022 Finland	

After the NHL decided not to send players to the 2022 Winter Olympics, Tomkins was selected to Canada national team as one of three goaltenders. Tomkins was backup for the first two games of the preliminary round, a win over Germany and a loss to the United States. In the third game, he made his first start for Canada and got a shutout against China in a 5–0 win. Tomkins would follow by backstopping Canada to a 7–2 qualification round win over China again, before bowing out to Sweden in a 2–0 quarterfinal loss.

After his play in the 2022 Winter Olympics, Tomkins was once again called upon to Canada national team at the 2022 IIHF World Championship. He did not play until the gold medal game, where an injury early in the third period to starter Chris Driedger forced Tomkins into the game, where Canada would eventually lose 4–3 in overtime to Finland.

== Career statistics ==
=== Regular season and playoffs ===
			Regular season									Playoffs
Season	Team	League	GP	W	L	OTL	MIN	GA	SO	GAA	SV%	GP	W	L	MIN	GA	SO	GAA	SV%
2011–12	Sherwood Park Crusaders	AJHL	33	18	11	2	1,898	108	0	3.41	.894	10	4	6	—	—	1	3.53	0.897
2012–13	Sherwood Park Crusaders	AJHL	44	22	14	6	2,533	108	4	2.56	.924	10	5	5	—	—	0	3.26	.899
2013–14	Ohio State University	B1G	17	6	7	2	928	43	0	2.78	.911	—	—	—	—	—	—	—	—
2014–15	Ohio State University	B1G	14	6	7	2	768	42	2	3.28	.876	—	—	—	—	—	—	—	—
2015–16	Ohio State University	B1G	14	5	7	1	775	50	0	3.87	.888	—	—	—	—	—	—	—	—
2016–17	Ohio State University	B1G	22	12	5	3	1,136	47	1	2.48	.909	—	—	—	—	—	—	—	—
2017–18	Indy Fuel	ECHL	25	11	9	2	1,382	80	0	3.47	.912	—	—	—	—	—	—	—	—
2017–18	Rockford IceHogs	AHL	8	1	4	1	445	30	0	4.04	.871	—	—	—	—	—	—	—	—
2018–19	Indy Fuel	ECHL	54	29	19	5	3,221	163	2	3.04	.905	—	—	—	—	—	—	—	—
2019–20	Rockford IceHogs	AHL	13	5	7	1	769	40	0	3.12	.896	—	—	—	—	—	—	—	—
2020–21	Rockford IceHogs	AHL	15	5	9	1	879	47	0	3.21	.907	—	—	—	—	—	—	—	—
2021–22	Frölunda HC	SHL	33	19	13	0	1,855	76	3	2.46	.908	8	5	3	512	23	0	2.70	.885
2022–23	Färjestad BK	SHL	32	20	12	0	1,918	81	2	2.53	.911	7	3	4	403	18	0	2.68	.905
2023–24	Tampa Bay Lightning	NHL	6	3	2	1	360	20	0	3.33	.892	—	—	—	—	—	—	—	—
2023–24	Syracuse Crunch	AHL	29	15	12	2	1730	73	1	2.53	.904	1	0	1	58	5	0	5.16	.808
2024–25	Syracuse Crunch	AHL	26	12	10	4	1529	65	3	2.55	.907	—	—	—	—	—	—	—	—
2025–26	Bakersfield Condors	AHL	42	20	13	7	2458	122	4	2.98	.904	3	1	2	178	11	0	3.71	.875
SHL totals			65	39	25	0	3,773	157	5	2.50	.910	15	8	7	915	41	0	2.69	.895
NHL totals			6	3	2	1	360	20	0	3.33	.892	—	—	—	—	—	—	—	—

=== International ===
Year	Team	Event	Result	GP	W	L	T/OT	MIN	GA	SO	GAA	SV%
2022	Canada	OG	6th	3	2	1	0	178	3	1	1.01	.963
2022	Canada	WC	2nd place, silver medalist(s)	1	0	1	0	21	2	0	2.00	.786
Senior totals				4	2	2	0	199	5	1	1.26	.875
