= Adam Werner =

Swedish ice hockey player

- Born: May 2, 1997 (age 29) Mariestad, Sweden
- Height: 6 ft 5 in (196 cm)
- Weight: 198 lb (90 kg; 14 st 2 lb)
- Position: Goaltender
- Catches: Left
- Allsv team Former teams: MoDo Hockey; Färjestad BK; Colorado Avalanche; Malmö Redhawks; HC TPS; Linköping HC
- NHL draft: 131st overall, 2016; Colorado Avalanche
- Playing career: 2014–present

Adam Werner (born May 2, 1997) is a Swedish professional ice hockey goaltender currently under contract with MoDo Hockey of the HockeyAllsvenskan (Allsv). Werner was drafted by the Colorado Avalanche, 131st overall, in the 2016 NHL entry draft.

== Playing career ==
=== Färjestad BK ===
Werner first played as a youth with his hometown club, Mariestad BoIS HC, up to the Under-18 level. On 6 June 2013, having shown early potential in using his size to complement his style, Werner was signed under the eye of goaltending scout Erik Granqvist by SHL club Färjestad BK to continue his development at the U18 and J20 SuperElit leagues.

In his first season within Färjestad BK in 2013–14, Werner led the league at the U18 Elite level in goals against average and save percentage. Continuing his growth in the 2014–15 season, on 1 November 2014, having been promoted for the start of the SHL season, Werner made his professional debut as a 17-year-old whilst serving in his second game as backup, coming off the bench for 3 minutes in a game against Leksands IF. Werner returned to become a fixture of the J20 side, appearing in 14 games and earning recognition for joining the Swedish junior program.

In his second year in the J20 SuperElit, Werner improved his statistics from the previous year in 30 games with Färjestad. Unable to add to his SHL experience in the 2015–16 season, he was loaned to Hockeyettan clubs with brief appearances for Köping HC and Forshaga IF. He was also loaned to HockeyAllsvenskan club IF Björklöven. In making an impression from practicing with the squad, Werner failed to feature in Allsvenskan games before returning to Färjestad.

On April 15, 2016, Werner was signed to a one-year extension with Färjestad to solidify his position as the club's third-choice keeper at the age of 19. In order to progress his game, on 19 April 2016, Werner was re-loaned to IF Björklöven for the duration of the 2016–17 season. Assuming starting goaltender status with Björklöven, Werner appeared in 25 games in posted 12 wins as the club was unable to progress to the post-season. During the season, Werner was selected to the national junior team as Sweden's third-choice goaltender at the 2017 World Junior Championships.

In continuing his development, Werner agreed to a new two-year contract to remain under contract with Färjestad on March 15, 2017. It was announced that Werner would extend his tenure on loan with Björklöven for the 2017–18 season on March 22, 2017. In resuming with Björklöven, Werner won the starting role and led the league in minutes played through 47 appearances. In a successful season, he recorded 26 wins and a 2.34 GAA to help qualify for the playoffs. After the season with Björklöven, Werner traveled to North America and signed an amateur try-out deal with the Avalanche's American Hockey League affiliate, the San Antonio Rampage on 26 March 2018. He made his North American debut in a relief appearance, allowing 2 goals, during a 6–3 defeat to the Cleveland Monsters on April 6, 2018. He made his first start against the same opponent two days later, recording his first win in a 4–3 victory on 8 April 2018. With the conclusion of the regular season-ending his try-out deal with the Rampage, Werner finished with 2 wins in 4 games.

In the 2018–19 season, Werner was elevated to initially assume backup duties with Färjestad BK. In a successful season, establishing himself in the SHL, Werner would share the goaltender duties with veteran Markus Svensson and finished with a 15–6–3 record, a 2.02 goals-against average, and a .926 save percentage in 26 games. With Färjestad the number 1 seed leading into the post-season, he started the opening playoff game in a 2–1 overtime defeat to HV71 on March 22, 2019, before taking on the backup role for the remainder of the playoffs.

=== Colorado Avalanche ===
On 14 May 2019, Werner was signed by the Colorado Avalanche to a two-year, entry-level contract. In his first season in North America, Werner attended the Avalanche's training camp before he was assigned to begin the 2019–20 season with AHL affiliate, the Colorado Eagles on 23 September 2019. Acclimatising to the North American rink, Werner started in 9 of the Eagles' first 11 games, collecting his first shutout in a 4–0 victory over the Ontario Reign on 5 November 2019. On 7 November 2019, with the Avalanche suffering an injury to starting goaltender Philipp Grubauer, Werner was recalled for the first time to serve in a backup role.

Assuming the backup duties on 12 November 2019, Werner unexpectedly made his NHL debut against the Winnipeg Jets, after Pavel Francouz was injured in the opening minute of the game. In playing 59 minutes, he backstopped the Avalanche to a 4–0 shutout victory over the Jets, not allowing a goal on 40 shots. In recording his first win, Werner became the first goalie in Avalanche/Nordiques franchise history to win his debut in relief, while becoming just the ninth goaltender in the NHL to collect 40 or more saves in his debut since 1955–56. With both Avalanche goaltenders sidelined through injury, Werner was given his first start in against the Edmonton Oilers on 14 November 2019. Allowing a Connor McDavid hatrick and 5 goals in 18 shots, Werner was pulled midway into the second period in an eventual 6–2 defeat. Having made 2 appearances with the Avalanche, Werner was returned to the Eagles on 19 November.

Approaching the second season of his entry-level contract, and with the 2020–21 delayed North American season, Werner remained in Sweden, loaned by the Colorado Avalanche to resume playing with HC Vita Hästen of the Allsvenskan on 16 September 2020. Werner made just 5 appearances with Vita Hästen, posting 2 wins, before his loan was ended and returned to North America.

Following his second full season in North America, Werner having concluded his entry-level deal was not tendered a qualifying offer by the Avalanche, and was released to free agency on 26 July 2021.

=== Calgary Flames ===
Werner was signed on the opening day of free agency, agreeing to a one-year, two-way contract with the Calgary Flames on July 28, 2021. In the following 2021–22 season, Werner was assigned by the Flames to play exclusively with AHL affiliate, the Stockton Heat. In 21 appearances and assuming the role as the Heat's backup goaltender to Dustin Wolf, Werner collected 12 wins and a .886 save percentage.

=== Malmö Redhawks ===
As an impending restricted free agent from the Flames, Werner opted to return to his native Sweden and resume his SHL career by agreeing to a two-year contract with the Malmö Redhawks on 20 June 2022 commencing from the 2022–23 season.

=== HC TPS ===
At the conclusion of his contract with the Redhawks, Werner was not extended by the club and left as a free agent. He paused his career in the SHL, in signing an optional two-year contract with Finnish Liiga club, HC TPS, on 18 April 2024. In the 2024–25 season, Werner made 22 appearances with TPS, compiling just 7 wins before leaving the club through mutual consent.

=== Return to Sweden ===
In returning to Sweden, Werner temporarily joined SHL club, Linköping HC, on loan and made 6 appearances to end the season. As a free agent, Werner opted to drop down to the Allsvenskan, signing a two-year contract with recently relegated club, MoDo Hockey, on 2 May 2025.

== Career statistics ==
=== Regular season and playoffs ===
			Regular season									Playoffs
Season	Team	League	GP	W	L	OTL	MIN	GA	SO	GAA	SV%	GP	W	L	MIN	GA	SO	GAA	SV%
2013–14	Färjestad BK	J20	6	4	2	0	362	18	1	2.96	.894	—	—	—	—	—	—	—	—
2014–15	Färjestad BK	J20	14	8	6	0	834	41	1	2.95	.905	6	3	3	357	20	0	3.36	.899
2014–15	Färjestad BK	SHL	1	0	0	0	3	0	0	0.00	.000	—	—	—	—	—	—	—	—
2015–16	Färjestad BK	J20	17	13	4	0	1033	38	3	2.21	.916	5	2	3	306	13	1	2.55	.924
2015–16	Köping HC	Div.1	1	0	0	1	65	2	0	1.85	.944	—	—	—	—	—	—	—	—
2015–16	Forshaga IF	Div.1	2	1	1	0	119	5	0	2.53	.914	—	—	—	—	—	—	—	—
2016–17	IF Björklöven	Allsv	25	12	13	0	1471	73	2	2.98	.892	—	—	—	—	—	—	—	—
2017–18	IF Björklöven	Allsv	47	26	21	0	2794	109	3	2.34	.914	5	4	1	303	12	0	2.38	.902
2017–18	San Antonio Rampage	AHL	4	2	1	0	215	12	0	3.35	.880	—	—	—	—	—	—	—	—
2018–19	Färjestad BK	SHL	26	15	6	3	1485	50	3	2.02	.926	2	0	1	90	2	0	1.54	.917
2019–20	Colorado Eagles	AHL	31	18	10	1	1769	86	2	2.92	.909	—	—	—	—	—	—	—	—
2019–20	Colorado Avalanche	NHL	2	1	1	0	88	5	0	3.42	.914	—	—	—	—	—	—	—	—
2020–21	HC Vita Hästen	Allsv	5	2	3	0	295	19	0	3.87	.862	—	—	—	—	—	—	—	—
2020–21	Colorado Eagles	AHL	11	6	4	1	659	28	1	2.55	.908	1	1	0	69	4	0	3.48	.871
2021–22	Stockton Heat	AHL	21	12	6	2	1186	60	0	3.04	.886	—	—	—	—	—	—	—	—
2022–23	Malmö Redhawks	SHL	20	10	9	0	1171	53	1	2.72	.906	—	—	—	—	—	—	—	—
2023–24	Malmö Redhawks	SHL	25	11	14	0	1444	66	0	2.74	.900	—	—	—	—	—	—	—	—
2024–25	HC TPS	Liiga	22	7	8	6	1257	61	0	2.91	.875	—	—	—	—	—	—	—	—
2024–25	Linköping HC	SHL	6	3	3	0	361	15	0	2.49	.895	—	—	—	—	—	—	—	—
2025–26	MoDo Hockey	Allsv	38	23	15	0	2254	84	4	2.24	.904	6	3	3	354	20	0	3.39	.869
SHL totals			78	39	32	3	4,464	184	4	2.47	.910	2	0	1	90	2	0	1.54	.917
NHL totals			2	1	1	0	88	5	0	3.42	.914	—	—	—	—	—	—	—	—

=== International ===
Year	Team	Event	Result	GP	W	L	T	MIN	GA	SO	GAA	SV%
2013	Sweden	IH18	7th	1	0	0	0	—	0	0	0.00	1.000
2014	Sweden	IH18	4th	2	1	1	0	—	—	0	3.39	.865
Junior totals				3	1	1	0	—	—	0	—	—
