= Emil Larmi =

Finnish ice hockey player (born 1996)

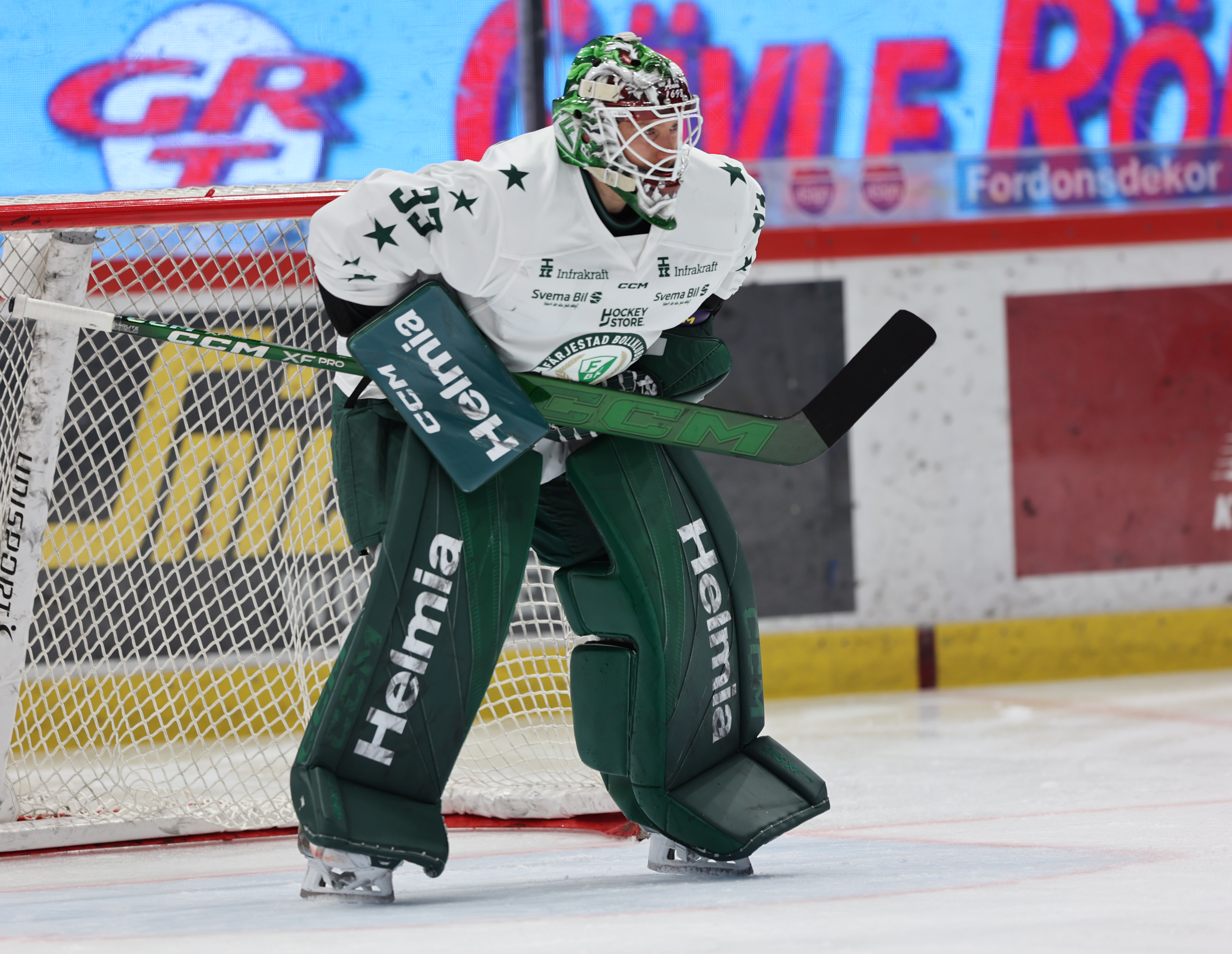
- Larmi with Färjestad BK in 2026
- Born: 28 September 1996 (age 29) Lahti, Finland
- Height: 188 cm (6 ft 2 in)
- Weight: 92 kg (203 lb; 14 st 7 lb)
- Position: Goaltender
- Catches: Left
- SHL team Former teams: Färjestad BK; HPK; Lahti Pelicans; Växjö Lakers
- National team: Finland
- NHL draft: Undrafted
- Playing career: 2015–present

Medal record

Representing Finland

Ice hockey

World Junior Championships
Gold medal – first place	2016 Finland	

Emil Larmi (born 28 September 1996) is a Finnish professional ice hockey goaltender for Färjestad BK of the Swedish Hockey League (SHL).

== Playing career ==
Larmi made his Liiga debut playing with HPK during the 2016–17 Liiga season. On 2 June 2019, Larmi signed a two-year, entry-level contract with the Pittsburgh Penguins of the National Hockey League (NHL).

On 20 December 2019, Larmi was reassigned to the Wheeling Nailers, the ECHL affiliate of the Pittsburgh Penguins, playing 11 games before the season was paused. He was loaned back to HPK for the beginning of the 2020–21 season, playing 12 games before returning to the Wilkes-Barre/Scranton Penguins of the AHL. He played 4 games with Wilkes-Barre before being recalled by the Pittsburgh Penguins Taxi Squad on February 19, 2021.

As an impending free agent from the Penguins, Larmi returned to the Liiga on a full-time basis in agreeing to a two-year contract with the Lahti Pelicans on 31 May 2021. In the following 2021–22 season, Larmi made 32 appearances with the Pelicans collecting 13 wins while posting a .918 save percentage. On 16 February 2022, Larmi left the Pelicans and immediately joined SHL club, Växjö Lakers, for the remainder of the season and following 2022–23 season.

== Awards and honors ==
Award	Year
Liiga
Kanada-malja (HPK)	2018–19
SHL
Le Mat Trophy (Växjö Lakers)	2022–23
