= Rasmus Rissanen =

Finnish ice hockey player (born 1991)

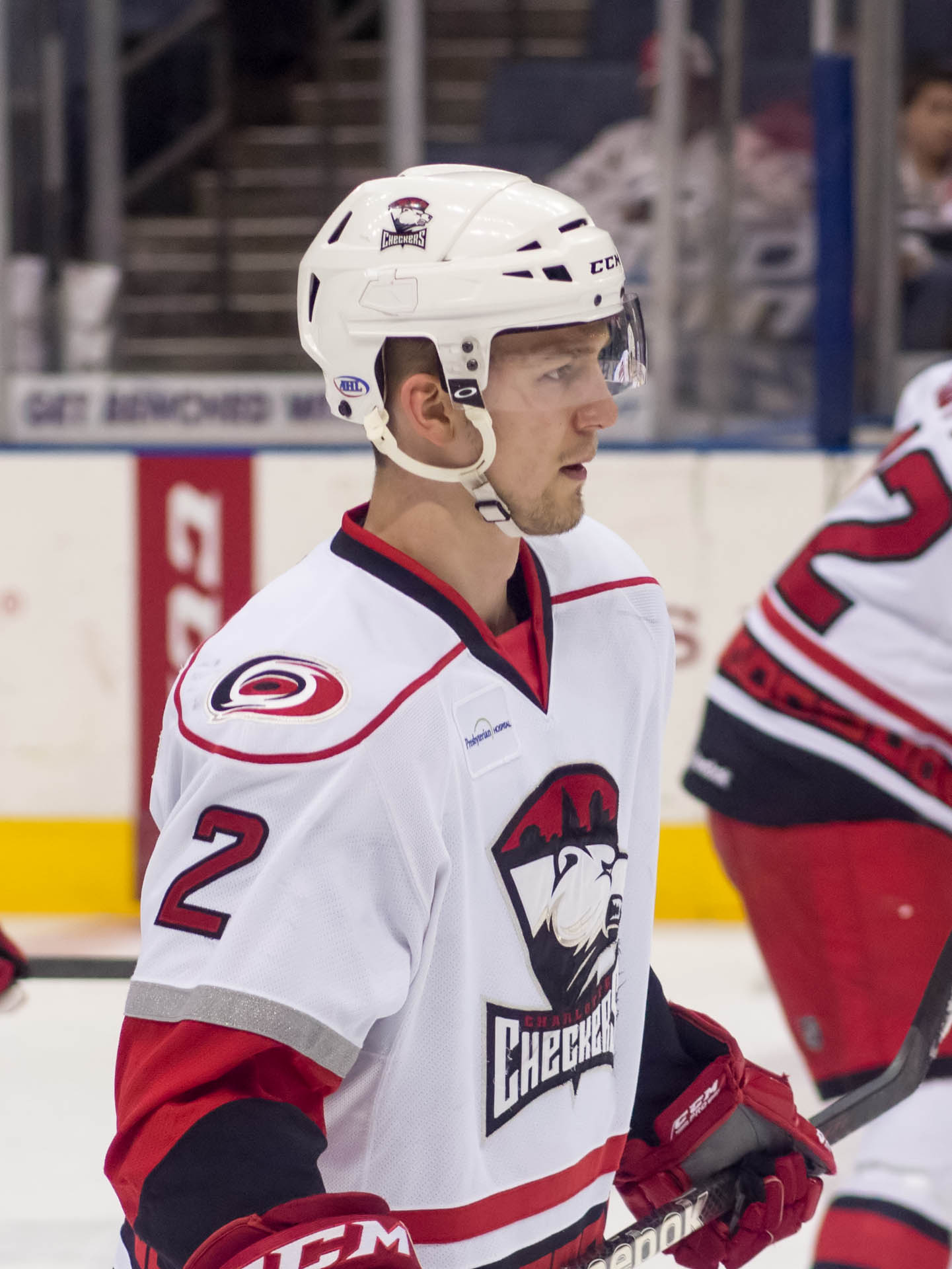
- Born: July 13, 1991 (age 35) Kuopio, Finland
- Height: 6 ft 3 in (191 cm)
- Weight: 216 lb (98 kg; 15 st 6 lb)
- Position: Defence
- Shoots: Left
- SHL team Former teams: Linköping HC; Carolina Hurricanes; Jokerit; Örebro HK
- National team: Finland
- NHL draft: 178th overall, 2009; Carolina Hurricanes
- Playing career: 2011–present

Rasmus Rissanen (born July 13, 1991) is a Finnish professional ice hockey defenceman. He is currently under contract with Linköping HC in the Swedish Hockey League (SHL). Rissanen was selected by the Carolina Hurricanes in the 6th round (178th overall) of the 2009 NHL entry draft.

== Playing career ==
Rissanen played youth hockey in his native Finland with KalPa before leaving to play major junior hockey in the Western Hockey League (WHL) with the Everett Silvertips.

On April 4, 2011, the Carolina Hurricanes of the National Hockey League signed Rissanen to a three-year, entry-level contract, and he made his professional debut with the Charlotte Checkers of the American Hockey League near the end of the 2010–11 season.

In his fourth full professional season in 2014–15 season, Rissanen was finally recalled from the Checkers and made his NHL debut with the Hurricanes in a 3–1 defeat to the Minnesota Wild on March 6, 2015. During his seven-year stint in North America, he played a total of six games in the NHL, 294 in the AHL and 139 in the WHL.

After 5 seasons within the Hurricanes organization and unable to solidify an NHL role, Rissanen opted to return to his native Finland, signing with Jokerit, a member of the Kontinental Hockey League (KHL), on May 2, 2016.

Rissanen played two seasons in the KHL, before leaving Jokerit at the conclusion of his contract and signing a two-year deal with Swedish outfit, Örebro HK of the SHL, on June 5, 2018.

At the conclusion of the 2023–24 season, having completed six seasons with Örebro HK, Rissanen ended his tenure with the club after signing a two-year contract to continue in the SHL with Linköping HC on 24 April 2024.

== Career statistics ==
=== Regular season and playoffs ===
			Regular season					Playoffs
Season	Team	League	GP	G	A	Pts	PIM	GP	G	A	Pts	PIM
2009–10	Everett Silvertips	WHL	71	4	11	15	103	7	0	1	1	8
2010–11	Everett Silvertips	WHL	68	1	11	12	89	4	2	0	2	8
2010–11	Charlotte Checkers	AHL	1	0	0	0	0	—	—	—	—	—
2011–12	Charlotte Checkers	AHL	64	3	3	6	57	—	—	—	—	—
2012–13	Charlotte Checkers	AHL	61	0	9	9	84	5	0	0	0	10
2013–14	Charlotte Checkers	AHL	62	3	7	10	91	—	—	—	—	—
2014–15	Charlotte Checkers	AHL	52	1	10	11	69	—	—	—	—	—
2014–15	Carolina Hurricanes	NHL	6	0	0	0	4	—	—	—	—	—
2015–16	Charlotte Checkers	AHL	54	2	11	13	56	—	—	—	—	—
2016–17	Jokerit	KHL	44	2	2	4	55	3	0	0	0	2
2017–18	Jokerit	KHL	31	0	3	3	18	7	0	0	0	2
2018–19	Örebro HK	SHL	48	0	3	3	53	2	0	0	0	0
2019–20	Örebro HK	SHL	39	3	6	9	59	—	—	—	—	—
2020–21	Örebro HK	SHL	46	2	7	9	32	9	0	0	0	20
2021–22	Örebro HK	SHL	23	2	4	6	16	—	—	—	—	—
2022–23	Örebro HK	SHL	51	8	10	18	44	13	4	2	6	35
2023–24	Örebro HK	SHL	51	2	17	19	16	3	0	0	0	4
2024–25	Linköping HC	SHL	51	2	8	10	14	—	—	—	—	—
NHL totals			6	0	0	0	4	—	—	—	—	—
KHL totals			75	2	5	7	73	10	0	0	0	4
SHL totals			309	19	55	74	234	27	4	2	6	59

=== International ===
Year	Team	Event	Result	GP	G	A	Pts	PIM
2008	Finland	U17	6th	5	0	1	1	14
2008	Finland	U18	6th	6	0	2	2	18
2009	Finland	U18	3rd place, bronze medalist(s)	6	0	0	0	10
2011	Finland	WJC	6th	6	0	0	0	14
2024	Finland	WC	8th	7	1	1	2	4
2025	Finland	WC	7th	8	0	1	1	2
Junior totals				23	0	3	3	56
Senior totals				15	1	2	3	6
