= Joonas Lyytinen =

Finnish ice hockey player

- Born: April 4, 1995 (age 31) Espoo, Finland
- Height: 6 ft 0 in (183 cm)
- Weight: 159 lb (72 kg; 11 st 5 lb)
- Position: Defence
- Shoots: Left
- SHL team Former teams: Leksands IF; KalPa; Milwaukee Admirals; HIFK; Timrå IK
- NHL draft: 132nd overall, 2014; Nashville Predators
- Playing career: 2013–present

Joonas Lyytinen (born April 4, 1995) is a Finnish ice hockey defenceman who currently plays for Leksands IF in the Swedish Hockey League (SHL). He was chosen by the Nashville Predators in the fifth round, 132nd overall, of the 2014 NHL entry draft.

== Playing career ==
Lyytinen made his professional debut in the Liiga with KalPa during the 2013–14 Liiga season. In his first appearances, he gained valuable experience competing against seasoned players in Finland's top league.

After playing his entire junior career and four professional seasons in the Liiga with KalPa, Lyytinen departed the team by signing a one-year contract with another Finnish club, Oulun Kärpät, on May 2, 2017. However, just over a month later, on June 16, 2017, he chose to pursue an NHL opportunity, agreeing to a two-year entry-level contract with the Nashville Predators, the team that had drafted him.

During the final year of his entry-level contract in the 2018–19 season, Lyytinen faced challenges in making a significant impact with the Milwaukee Admirals, the American Hockey League (AHL) affiliate of the Nashville Predators. Despite his efforts, he was unable to secure a regular spot in the lineup or meet the organization's expectations for development. As a result, both Lyytinen and the Predators agreed to part ways, and on December 28, 2018, he was placed on unconditional waivers to mutually terminate his contract. Soon after clearing waivers and becoming an unrestricted free agent, Lyytinen opted to return to his home country of Finland. On December 30, 2018, he signed a three-year contract with HIFK, one of the top clubs in the Finnish Liiga.

In his fifth year with HIFK, Lyytinen began the 2022-23 Liiga season but saw limited action, appearing in just seven games. On October 19, 2022, Lyytinen signed a two-year contract with Timrå IK of the Swedish Hockey League (SHL).

== Career statistics ==
=== Regular season and playoffs ===
			Regular season					Playoffs
Season	Team	League	GP	G	A	Pts	PIM	GP	G	A	Pts	PIM
2011–12	KalPa	Jr. A	5	1	3	4	6	—	—	—	—	—
2012–13	KalPa	Jr. A	31	4	9	13	30	3	0	0	0	4
2013–14	KalPa	Jr. A	24	7	17	24	32	—	—	—	—	—
2013–14	KalPa	Liiga	30	3	6	9	24	—	—	—	—	—
2014–15	KalPa	Liiga	52	8	9	17	34	6	0	0	0	6
2015–16	KalPa	Liiga	47	2	7	9	22	3	0	0	0	0
2015–16	KalPa	Jr. A	—	—	—	—	—	8	2	4	6	10
2016–17	KalPa	Liiga	54	8	16	24	34	18	2	5	7	16
2017–18	Milwaukee Admirals	AHL	34	1	4	5	28	—	—	—	—	—
2017–18	Norfolk Admirals	ECHL	5	3	1	4	4	—	—	—	—	—
2017–18	Atlanta Gladiators	ECHL	4	1	1	2	4	—	—	—	—	—
2018–19	Milwaukee Admirals	AHL	20	0	3	3	6	—	—	—	—	—
2018–19	HIFK	Liiga	24	2	11	13	18	13	0	2	2	6
2019–20	HIFK	Liiga	46	1	16	17	20	—	—	—	—	—
2020–21	HIFK	Liiga	34	12	10	22	28	8	1	4	5	2
2021–22	HIFK	Liiga	19	0	1	1	2	—	—	—	—	—
2022–23	HIFK	Liiga	7	0	1	1	2	—	—	—	—	—
2022–23	Timrå IK	SHL	37	4	11	15	12	7	2	1	3	10
2023–24	Timrå IK	SHL	34	2	6	8	16	2	0	0	0	2
2024–25	Leksands IF	SHL	47	3	9	12	44	—	—	—	—	—
Liiga totals			313	36	77	113	184	48	3	11	14	30

=== International ===
Year	Team	Event	Result	GP	G	A	Pts	PIM
2012	Finland	IH18	2nd place, silver medalist(s)	5	0	0	0	0
2015	Finland	WJC	7th	5	0	1	1	4
Junior totals				10	0	1	1	4
