= Ludvig Nilsson =

Swedish ice hockey player

- Born: March 28, 1994 (age 30); Stockholm, Sweden
- Height: 6 ft 1 in (185 cm)
- Weight: 192 lb (87 kg; 13 st 10 lb)
- Position: Forward
- Shoots: Left
- SHL team Former teams: Växjö Lakers; Timrå IK; Modo Hockey; Brynäs IF
- Playing career: 2013–present

Ludvig Nilsson (born March 28, 1994) is a Swedish ice hockey player. He is currently playing with the Växjö Lakers of the Swedish Hockey League (SHL).

Nilsson made his Elitserien (now the SHL) debut playing with Timrå IK during the 2012–13 Elitserien season.

== Awards and honours ==
Award	Year
SHL
Le Mat Trophy (Växjö Lakers)	2021, 2023
