= Anthony Greco =

American ice hockey player (born 1993)

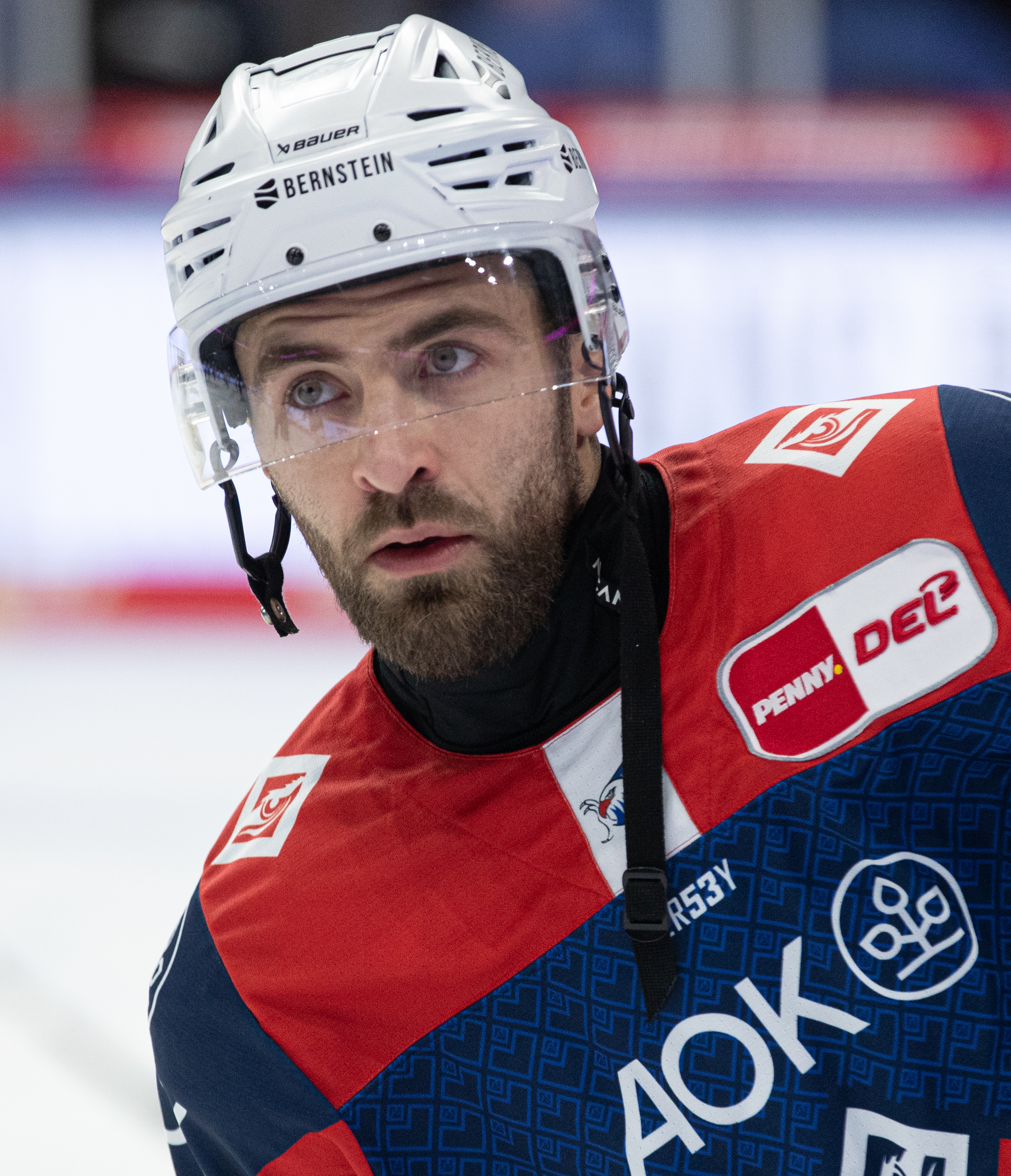
- Greco with the Adler Mannheim in 2025
- Born: September 30, 1993 (age 32) Queens, New York, U.S.
- Height: 5 ft 10 in (178 cm)
- Weight: 172 lb (78 kg; 12 st 4 lb)
- Position: Right wing
- Shoots: Right
- NL team Former teams: EHC Biel; Florida Panthers; New York Rangers; Frölunda HC; Linköping HC; Lada Togliatti
- NHL draft: Undrafted
- Playing career: 2016–present

Anthony Greco (born September 30, 1993) is an American professional ice hockey forward for Adler Mannheim of the Deutsche Eishockey Liga.

== Early life ==
The second son of three boys, Greco was born on September 30, 1993, in Queens, New York to parents Paul and Mary Jane. His mother is a retired nurse while his father served as a member of the New York City Fire Department and suffered illnesses and conditions following his efforts during the September 11 attacks. While his father played baseball in college, Greco grew up a fan of the New York Rangers.

== Playing career ==
=== Amateur ===
Undrafted to the NHL, Greco played college hockey with the Ohio State Buckeyes from 2012 to 2016 after playing junior with the Des Moines Buccaneers and Waterloo Blackhawks in the USHL. He then turned pro, playing in the American Hockey League for the Bridgeport Sound Tigers and Springfield Thunderbirds.

=== Professional ===
Greco was signed by the Florida Panthers of the National Hockey League to a two-year, two-way contact in November 2017. In the 2018–19 season, Greco was recalled from his assignment with the Springfield Thunderbirds to the Panthers on December 11, 2018 and made his NHL debut on December 13, in a 5–1 loss to the Minnesota Wild.

On July 15, 2019, Greco signed a one-year, two-way contract extension with the Panthers on July 15, 2019. In the following 2019–20 season, Greco continued with the Springfield Thunderbirds, collecting 19 points in 37 games. On February 20, 2020, Greco was traded by the Panthers to the Tampa Bay Lightning in exchange for Danick Martel Assigned to AHL affiliate, the Syracuse Crunch, Greco recorded 1 assist in just three games.

On February 24, 2020, Greco's brief stint in the Lightning organization ended when he was included in a trade along with a 2020 first-round pick to the San Jose Sharks in exchange for Barclay Goodrow and a third-round pick. He was immediately re-assigned to join the Sharks affiliate, the San Jose Barracuda. He posted 4 points in just 7 games with the Barracuda before the remainder of the season was cancelled due to the COVID-19 pandemic.

On October 9, 2020, having left the Sharks as a free agent he joined the New York Rangers on a two-year, two-way contract. Greco made his Rangers debut against the Sharks on January 13, 2022.

Having played the first seven seasons of his professional career in North America, on June 27, 2022, Greco opted to pursue a career abroad in agreeing to a one-year contract with Swedish top flight club, Frölunda HC of the Swedish Hockey League (SHL).

Following two seasons in the SHL with Frölunda HC and Linköping HC, Greco left Sweden to sign a one-year contract with Russian club, HC Lada Togliatti of the KHL, on July 1, 2024. In the 2024–25 season, Greco made just 19 appearances with Lada before he left the KHL and signed for the remainder of the season with Swiss club, EHC Biel of the NL, on November 28, 2024.

In July 2025, Greco signed a two-year contract with the German club Adler Mannheim of the DEL.

== Career statistics ==
			Regular season					Playoffs
Season	Team	League	GP	G	A	Pts	PIM	GP	G	A	Pts	PIM
2010–11	Shattuck-Saint Mary's	Midget AAA	54	12	25	37	4	—	—	—	—	—
2010–11	Waterloo Black Hawks	USHL	10	1	1	2	2	—	—	—	—	—
2010–11	Des Moines Buccaneers	USHL	32	7	6	13	0	—	—	—	—	—
2011–12	Des Moines Buccaneers	USHL	58	22	24	46	19	—	—	—	—	—
2012–13	Ohio State University	CCHA	20	5	6	11	2	—	—	—	—	—
2013–14	Ohio State University	B1G	33	5	10	15	4	—	—	—	—	—
2014–15	Ohio State University	B1G	36	15	8	23	6	—	—	—	—	—
2015–16	Ohio State University	B1G	36	12	11	23	4	—	—	—	—	—
2015–16	Bridgeport Sound Tigers	AHL	—	—	—	—	—	1	0	0	0	0
2016–17	Springfield Thunderbirds	AHL	74	16	15	31	41	—	—	—	—	—
2017–18	Springfield Thunderbirds	AHL	75	29	19	48	26	—	—	—	—	—
2018–19	Springfield Thunderbirds	AHL	75	30	29	59	25	—	—	—	—	—
2018–19	Florida Panthers	NHL	1	0	0	0	0	—	—	—	—	—
2019–20	Springfield Thunderbirds	AHL	37	10	9	19	12	—	—	—	—	—
2019–20	Syracuse Crunch	AHL	3	0	1	1	0	—	—	—	—	—
2019–20	San Jose Barracuda	AHL	7	1	3	4	2	—	—	—	—	—
2020–21	Hartford Wolf Pack	AHL	23	3	11	14	2	—	—	—	—	—
2021–22	Hartford Wolf Pack	AHL	66	20	38	58	10	—	—	—	—	—
2021–22	New York Rangers	NHL	1	0	0	0	0	—	—	—	—	—
2022–23	Frölunda HC	SHL	47	13	12	25	16	13	4	4	8	0
2023–24	Linköping HC	SHL	33	6	9	15	35	4	0	0	0	0
2024–25	Lada Togliatti	KHL	19	1	3	4	2	—	—	—	—	—
2024–25	EHC Biel	NL	24	12	3	15	2	—	—	—	—	—
NHL totals			2	0	0	0	0	—	—	—	—	—
SHL totals			80	19	21	40	51	17	4	4	8	0

== Awards and honors ==
Award	Year
College
B1G Honorable Mention All-Star Team	2015
