= Dennis Rasmussen (ice hockey) =

Swedish ice hockey player

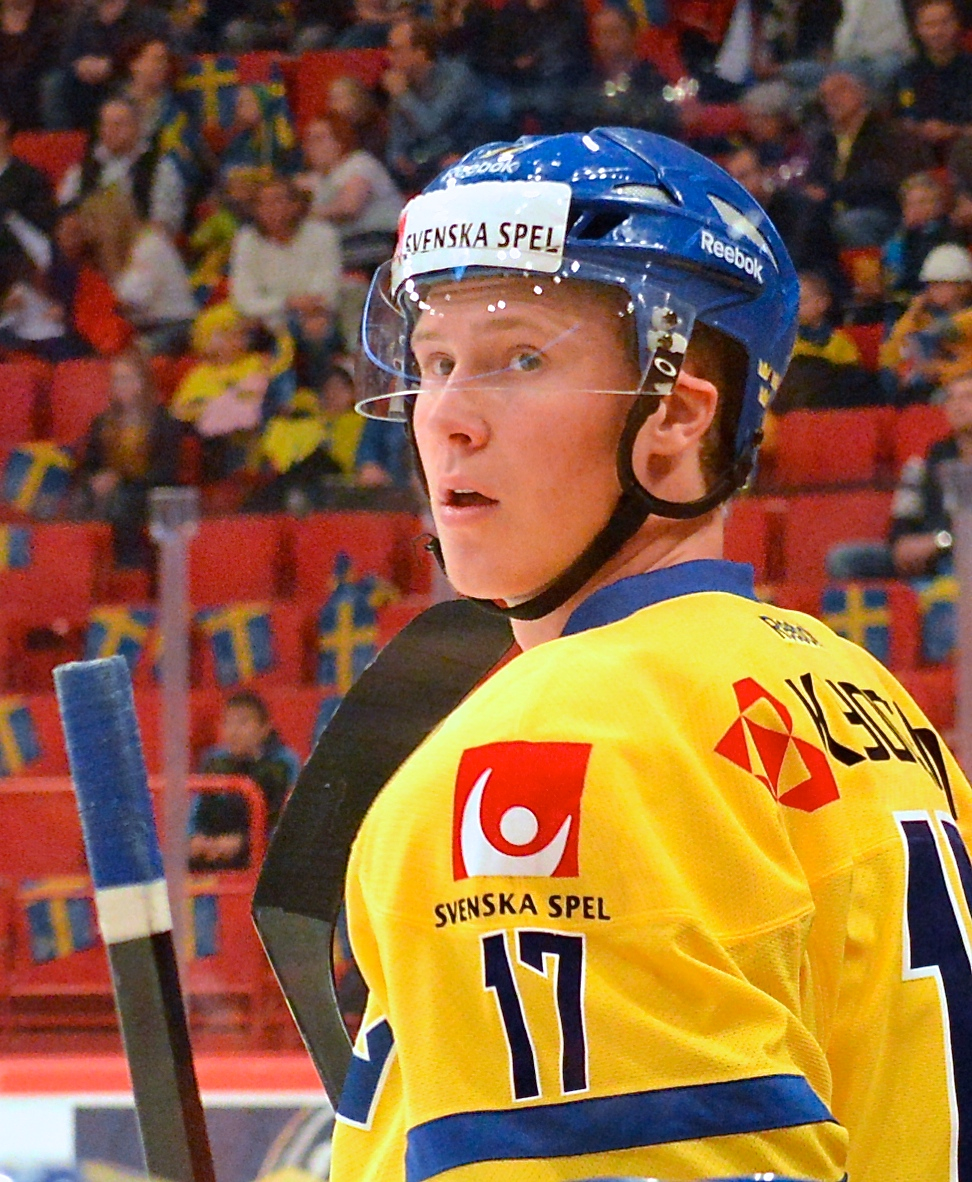
- Rasmussen in 2014
- Born: 3 July 1990 (age 36) Västerås, Sweden
- Height: 191 cm (6 ft 3 in)
- Weight: 87 kg (192 lb; 13 st 10 lb)
- Position: Centre
- Shoots: Left
- SHL team Former teams: Växjö Lakers; Chicago Blackhawks; Anaheim Ducks; Metallurg Magnitogorsk; HC Davos
- National team: Sweden
- NHL draft: Undrafted
- Playing career: 2009–present

Dennis Rasmussen (born 3 July 1990) is a Swedish professional ice hockey centre who is currently playing for Växjö Lakers of the Swedish Hockey League (SHL).

== Playing career ==
Rasmussen played as a youth and made his professional debut with VIK Västerås HK before he was brought to Växjö Lakers after their promotion to the Elitserien on 14 April 2011. After two successful seasons establishing a position within the team, Rasmussen was re-signed to a two-year extension on 30 January 2013.

Following a successful 2013–14 season with the Lakers, in which he finished 10th in league scoring with 40 points, Rasmussen agreed to a one-year entry-level contract with the Chicago Blackhawks of the NHL on 10 June 2014. He scored his first career NHL goal in his first NHL game on 8 December 2015 against Pekka Rinne of the Nashville Predators.

On 7 July 2017, he signed a one-year, one-way contract worth $725,000 with the Anaheim Ducks. He began the 2017–18 season on the Ducks fourth line. In a depth role, Rasmussen collected 4 points in 27 games before on he was placed and cleared waivers and was re-assigned to the Ducks' AHL affiliate, the San Diego Gulls on 29 December 2017. On 13 February 2018, Rasmussen signed with his former team, the Växjö Lakers of the Swedish Hockey League (SHL), after his contract was terminated by the Ducks.

On 3 June 2021, Rasmussen was signed as a free agent to a two-year contract with Swiss club, HC Davos of the National League (NL).

Rasmussen played with Davos for three seasons before returning to the SHL on a three-year contract with the Växjö Lakers on 6 May 2024.

== Career statistics ==
=== Regular season and playoffs ===
			Regular season					Playoffs
Season	Team	League	GP	G	A	Pts	PIM	GP	G	A	Pts	PIM
2007–08	VIK Västerås HK	J20	39	8	11	19	38	3	1	2	3	8
2008–09	VIK Västerås HK	J20	40	19	25	44	18	3	1	3	4	0
2008–09	VIK Västerås HK	Allsv	15	2	1	3	4	5	3	1	4	0
2009–10	VIK Västerås HK	J20	3	1	3	4	29	5	1	4	5	2
2009–10	VIK Västerås HK	Allsv	44	4	13	17	20	—	—	—	—	—
2010–11	VIK Västerås HK	Allsv	48	10	23	33	16	6	3	2	5	0
2011–12	Växjö Lakers	SEL	55	8	9	17	10	—	—	—	—	—
2012–13	Växjö Lakers	SEL	42	16	12	28	28	—	—	—	—	—
2013–14	Växjö Lakers	SHL	52	16	24	40	20	12	2	4	6	6
2014–15	Rockford IceHogs	AHL	73	13	14	27	30	7	0	0	0	2
2015–16	Rockford IceHogs	AHL	25	7	9	16	18	3	1	1	2	0
2015–16	Chicago Blackhawks	NHL	44	4	5	9	4	—	—	—	—	—
2016–17	Chicago Blackhawks	NHL	68	4	4	8	12	3	1	0	1	0
2017–18	Anaheim Ducks	NHL	27	1	3	4	8	—	—	—	—	—
2017–18	San Diego Gulls	AHL	17	4	6	10	4	—	—	—	—	—
2017–18	Växjö Lakers	SHL	7	1	1	2	4	13	4	5	9	4
2018–19	Metallurg Magnitogorsk	KHL	61	14	34	48	6	6	1	0	1	4
2019–20	Metallurg Magnitogorsk	KHL	54	10	23	33	20	—	—	—	—	—
2020–21	Metallurg Magnitogorsk	KHL	36	10	6	16	12	12	3	2	5	6
2021–22	HC Davos	NL	51	10	26	36	18	11	1	1	2	4
2022–23	HC Davos	NL	40	15	10	25	10	5	1	2	3	4
2023–24	HC Davos	NL	46	7	21	28	16	4	0	3	3	4
2024–25	Växjö Lakers	SHL	46	9	14	23	8	7	2	2	4	0
SHL totals			202	50	60	110	70	32	8	11	19	10
NHL totals			139	9	12	21	24	3	1	0	1	0
KHL totals			151	34	63	97	38	18	4	2	6	10
NL totals			137	32	57	89	44	20	2	6	8	12

=== International ===
Medal record

Representing Sweden

Ice hockey

World Championships
Bronze medal – third place	2014 Minsk	

World Junior Championships
Bronze medal – third place	2010 Saskatchewan	

Year	Team	Event	Result	GP	G	A	Pts	PIM
2010	Sweden	WJC	3rd place, bronze medalist(s)	6	2	1	3	2
2014	Sweden	WC	3rd place, bronze medalist(s)	9	0	1	1	0
2019	Sweden	WC	5th	8	2	1	3	2
2021	Sweden	WC	9th	7	1	0	1	0
Junior totals				6	2	1	3	2
Senior totals				24	3	2	5	2

== Awards and honours ==
Award	Year
SHL
Le Mat Trophy champion	2018
International
World Junior bronze medal	2010
World Championship bronze medal	2014
Spengler Cup leading scorer	2023
Spengler Cup champion	2023
