= Filip Berglund =

Swedish ice hockey player

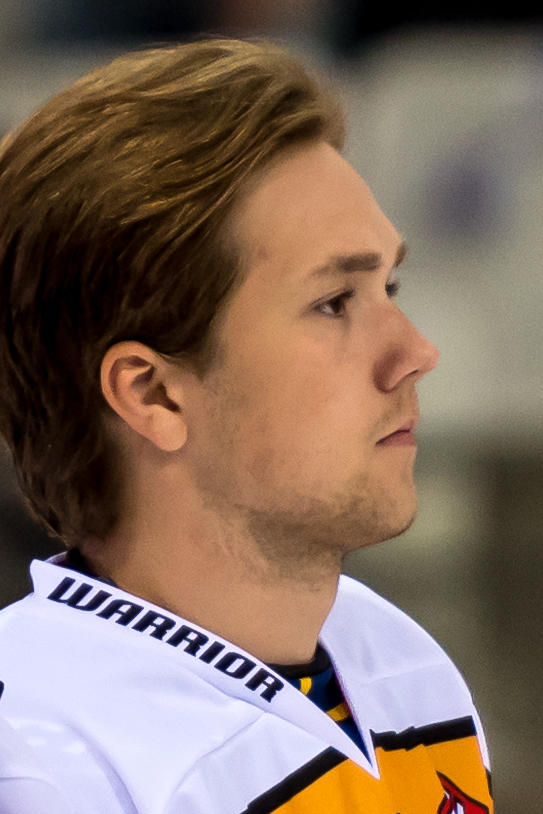
- Berglund with Skellefteå AIK in 2016
- Born: May 10, 1997 (age 29) Skellefteå, Sweden
- Height: 6 ft 3 in (191 cm)
- Weight: 209 lb (95 kg; 14 st 13 lb)
- Position: Defence
- Shoots: Right
- SHL team Former teams: Örebro HK; Skellefteå AIK; Linköping HC
- NHL draft: 91st overall, 2016; Edmonton Oilers
- Playing career: 2016–present

Filip Berglund (born May 10, 1997) is a Swedish professional ice hockey player. He is currently playing with Örebro HK of the Swedish Hockey League (SHL). Berglund was drafted 91st overall in the 2016 NHL entry draft by the Edmonton Oilers.

== Playing career ==
Berglund began playing youth hockey as a 14-year-old within the Skellefteå AIK organization. He made his senior Swedish Hockey League debut with Skellefteå AIK during the 2015–16 season. Before his selection by the Oilers in the NHL draft, Berglund was signed to a two-year contract extension to continue his development with Skellefteå on May 11, 2016.

In his fifth season with Skellefteå AIK in 2019–20, Berglund notched career highs 5 goals and 20 points in 52 games, before the season was cancelled due to the COVID-19. On 20 March 2020, approaching the conclusion of his contract with Skellefteå AIK, Berglund agreed to continue his development in the SHL, signing a one-year deal with Linköping HC.

On 2 May 2020, Berglund was also signed a two-year, entry-level contract with the draft club, the Edmonton Oilers. He would honour his contract with Linköping HC assigned on loan from the Oilers.

In the final season of his contract with the Edmonton Oilers, Berglund made his North American debut by appearing in 53 regular season games with American Hockey League affiliate, the Bakersfield Condors, he was limited to just 6 assists during the 2021–22 campaign.

As an impending restricted free agent with the Oilers, on 18 May 2022, Berglund opted to return to Sweden to join his third SHL club, Örebro HK, on a two-year contract.

== Career statistics ==
| | | | Regular season | | | | | Playoffs |
| Season | Team | League | GP | G | A | Pts | PIM | GP | G | A | Pts | PIM |
|---|---|---|---|---|---|---|---|---|---|---|---|---|
| 2013–14 | Skellefteå AIK | J20 | 5 | 0 | 0 | 0 | 2 | — | — | — | — | — |
| 2014–15 | Skellefteå AIK | J20 | 37 | 1 | 10 | 11 | 12 | 5 | 0 | 1 | 1 | 2 |
| 2015–16 | Skellefteå AIK | J20 | 43 | 19 | 22 | 41 | 6 | 5 | 1 | 3 | 4 | 8 |
| 2015–16 | Skellefteå AIK | SHL | 5 | 0 | 0 | 0 | 0 | 2 | 0 | 0 | 0 | 0 |
| 2016–17 | Skellefteå AIK | J20 | 10 | 3 | 4 | 7 | 2 | — | — | — | — | — |
| 2016–17 | Skellefteå AIK | SHL | 47 | 0 | 9 | 9 | 10 | 7 | 0 | 0 | 0 | 0 |
| 2017–18 | Skellefteå AIK | SHL | 44 | 3 | 10 | 13 | 32 | 16 | 0 | 4 | 4 | 10 |
| 2018–19 | Skellefteå AIK | SHL | 52 | 2 | 9 | 11 | 22 | 6 | 0 | 0 | 0 | 2 |
| 2019–20 | Skellefteå AIK | SHL | 52 | 5 | 15 | 20 | 16 | — | — | — | — | — |
| 2020–21 | Linköping HC | SHL | 32 | 1 | 7 | 8 | 14 | — | — | — | — | — |
| 2021–22 | Bakersfield Condors | AHL | 53 | 0 | 6 | 6 | 40 | 5 | 0 | 1 | 1 | 2 |
| 2022–23 | Örebro HK | SHL | 52 | 8 | 6 | 14 | 28 | 13 | 4 | 4 | 8 | 8 |
| 2023–24 | Örebro HK | SHL | 48 | 1 | 4 | 5 | 18 | 3 | 0 | 0 | 0 | 2 |
| 2024–25 | Örebro HK | SHL | 51 | 10 | 15 | 25 | 10 | 3 | 0 | 0 | 0 | 4 |
| SHL totals | | | 383 | 30 | 75 | 105 | 150 | 50 | 4 | 8 | 12 | 26 |
