= Joel Nyström =

Swedish ice hockey player (born 2002)

- Born: 14 May 2002 (age 24) Karlstad, Sweden
- Height: 5 ft 11 in (180 cm)
- Weight: 178 lb (81 kg; 12 st 10 lb)
- Position: Defence
- Shoots: Right
- NHL team (P) Cur. team Former teams: Carolina Hurricanes; Chicago Wolves (AHL); Färjestad BK
- NHL draft: 219th overall, 2021; Carolina Hurricanes
- Playing career: 2020–present

Joel Nyström (born 14 May 2002) is a Swedish professional ice hockey player who is a defenceman for the Chicago Wolves in the American Hockey League (AHL) while under contract to the Carolina Hurricanes of the National Hockey League (NHL). Nyström was drafted in the seventh round, 219th overall, by the Hurricanes in the 2021 NHL entry draft.

== Playing career ==
Nyström played as a youth within Färjestad BK organization of the Swedish Hockey League (SHL). He made his professional debut in the SHL during the 2020–21 season.

Showing his continued development, Nyström improved his points totals in each season, culminating in a setting career highs of 8 goals and 18 assists for 26 points through 51 regular season games in the 2023–24 season.

On 7 May 2024, Nyström was signed to a two-year, entry-level contract with draft club, the Carolina Hurricanes. He was loaned by the Hurricanes to continue his tenure with Färjestad BK for the 2024–25 season.

On 12 December 2025, he signed a four-year extension with the Hurricanes.

== Career statistics ==
			Regular season					Playoffs
Season	Team	League	GP	G	A	Pts	PIM	GP	G	A	Pts	PIM
2019–20	Färjestad BK	J20	30	0	9	9	4	—	—	—	—	—
2020–21	Färjestad BK	J20	15	4	7	11	2	—	—	—	—	—
2020–21	Färjestad BK	SHL	27	0	1	1	2	6	0	2	2	0
2021–22	Färjestad BK	SHL	46	5	11	16	4	19	0	4	4	0
2022–23	Färjestad BK	SHL	46	6	10	16	8	7	2	0	2	0
2023–24	Färjestad BK	SHL	51	8	18	26	18	4	0	1	1	2
2024–25	Färjestad BK	SHL	51	6	21	27	8	6	0	1	1	2
2024–25	Chicago Wolves	AHL	4	0	1	1	0	—	—	—	—	—
2025–26	Chicago Wolves	AHL	37	1	9	10	12	21	2	4	6	6
2025–26	Carolina Hurricanes	NHL	38	1	9	10	6	—	—	—	—	—
SHL totals			221	25	61	86	40	42	2	8	10	4
NHL totals			38	1	9	10	6	—	—	—	—	—

== Awards and honors ==
Award	Year	Ref
SHL
Le Mat Trophy champion	2022	
