= Måns Forsfjäll =

Swedish ice hockey player

- Born: 30 July 2002 (age 23); Skellefteå, Sweden
- Height: 6 ft 0 in (183 cm)
- Weight: 179 lb (81 kg; 12 st 11 lb)
- Position: Defence
- Shoots: Left
- SHL team: Skellefteå AIK
- Playing career: 2021–present

Måns Forsfjäll (born 30 July 2002) is a Swedish professional ice hockey defenceman who plays for Skellefteå AIK of the Swedish Hockey League (SHL). Forsfjäll made his SHL debut during the 2020–21 SHL season.

Medal record

Representing Sweden

Ice hockey

World Junior Championships
Bronze medal – third place	2022 Canada	

== Career statistics ==
=== Regular season and playoffs ===
			Regular season					Playoffs
Season	Team	League	GP	G	A	Pts	PIM	GP	G	A	Pts	PIM
2018–19	Skellefteå AIK	J20	1	0	0	0	0	—	—	—	—	—
2019–20	Skellefteå AIK	J20	42	7	14	21	18	—	—	—	—	—
2020–21	Skellefteå AIK	J20	5	0	2	2	2	—	—	—	—	—
2020–21	Piteå HC	Div. 1	14	0	2	2	31	4	0	2	2	2
2020–21	Skellefteå AIK	SHL	6	0	0	0	0	—	—	—	—	—
2021–22	Skellefteå AIK	J20	9	3	6	9	0	1	0	0	0	4
2021–22	Skellefteå AIK	SHL	45	2	3	5	8	6	0	0	0	4
2022–23	Skellefteå AIK	SHL	52	2	12	14	18	17	1	0	1	2
2023–24	Skellefteå AIK	SHL	48	2	5	7	20	11	0	2	2	2
2024–25	Skellefteå AIK	SHL	8	0	0	0	4	8	0	0	0	0
SHL totals			159	6	20	26	50	42	1	2	3	8

=== International ===
Year	Team	Event	Result	GP	G	A	Pts	PIM
2022	Sweden	WJC	3rd place, bronze medalist(s)	7	0	0	0	0
Junior totals				7	0	0	0	0

== Awards and honours ==
Award	Year
SHL
Le Mat Trophy	2024
