= Linus Högberg =

Swedish ice hockey player (born 1998)

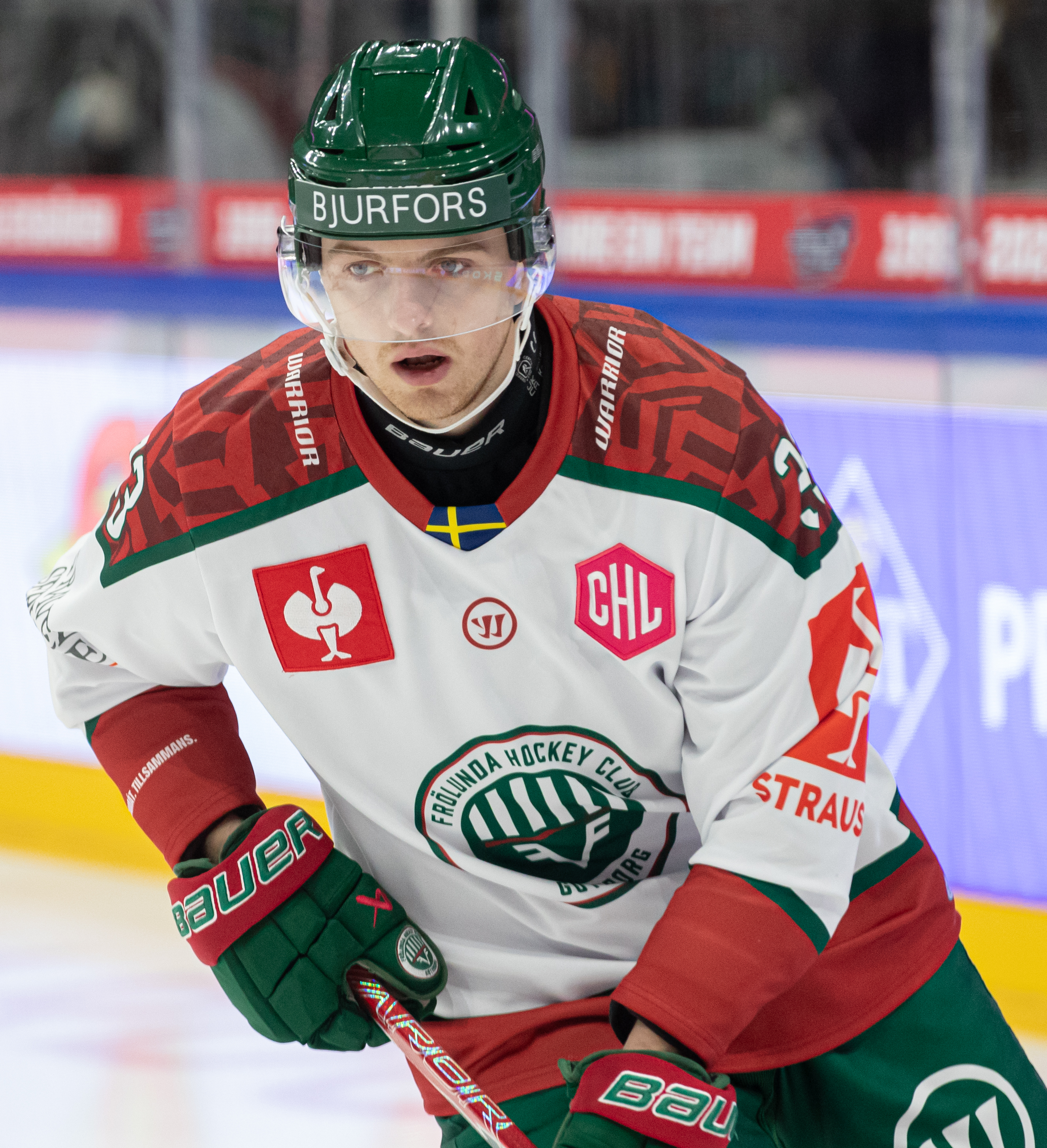
- Högberg in 2025
- Born: 4 September 1998 (age 27) Stockholm, Sweden
- Height: 186 cm (6 ft 1 in)
- Weight: 83 kg (183 lb; 13 st 1 lb)
- Position: Defence
- Shoots: Left
- SHL team Former teams: Frölunda HC; Växjö Lakers; Philadelphia Flyers; Skellefteå AIK
- NHL draft: 139th overall, 2016; Philadelphia Flyers
- Playing career: 2015–present

Linus Högberg (born 4 September 1998) is a Swedish professional ice hockey defenceman who plays for Frölunda HC in the Swedish Hockey League (SHL). He previously played in the National Hockey League (NHL) with the Philadelphia Flyers.

== Playing career ==
Högberg launched his professional hockey career during the 2015–16 season, making his debut with the Växjö Lakers in the Swedish Hockey League (SHL). His promising play caught the attention of NHL scouts, and in the 2016 NHL entry draft, he was selected in the fifth round, 139th overall, by the Philadelphia Flyers.

On May 31, 2020, Högberg took a significant step in his career by signing a three-year, entry-level contract with the Philadelphia Flyers of the NHL.

In the 2022–23 season, Högberg stayed with the Phantoms in the AHL, unable to secure a call-up to the NHL. After playing just 19 games, the Flyers placed him on unconditional waivers on February 9, 2023, leading to a mutual agreement to terminate his contract. Shortly after returning to Sweden, Högberg signed with Skellefteå AIK of the SHL on February 11, 2023, for the rest of the season. He contributed 4 points in 11 regular season games and added another 4 points over 17 playoff games, helping Skellefteå reach the SHL finals.

Högberg parted ways with Skellefteå following the conclusion of the 2022–23 season, entering free agency during the offseason. Opting to continue his career in his native Sweden, he signed a two-year contract with Frölunda HC, one of the top clubs in the SHL, on May 10, 2023.

== Career statistics ==
=== Regular season and playoffs ===
| | | | Regular season | | | | | Playoffs |
| Season | Team | League | GP | G | A | Pts | PIM | GP | G | A | Pts | PIM |
|---|---|---|---|---|---|---|---|---|---|---|---|---|
| 2013–14 | Huddinge IK | J20 | 2 | 0 | 2 | 2 | 0 | — | — | — | — | — |
| 2014–15 | Växjö Lakers | J20 | 40 | 2 | 1 | 3 | 8 | — | — | — | — | — |
| 2015–16 | Växjö Lakers | J20 | 39 | 7 | 18 | 25 | 14 | 2 | 0 | 0 | 0 | 0 |
| 2015–16 | Växjö Lakers | SHL | 2 | 0 | 0 | 0 | 0 | 1 | 0 | 0 | 0 | 0 |
| 2016–17 | Växjö Lakers | SHL | 35 | 0 | 4 | 4 | 6 | — | — | — | — | — |
| 2016–17 | IF Björklöven | Allsv | 3 | 0 | 0 | 0 | 0 | — | — | — | — | — |
| 2017–18 | Växjö Lakers | SHL | 42 | 2 | 4 | 6 | 6 | 13 | 0 | 3 | 3 | 0 |
| 2018–19 | Växjö Lakers | SHL | 52 | 2 | 8 | 10 | 8 | 7 | 0 | 1 | 1 | 2 |
| 2019–20 | Växjö Lakers | SHL | 50 | 5 | 9 | 14 | 12 | — | — | — | — | — |
| 2020–21 | HC Vita Hästen | Allsv | 27 | 2 | 10 | 12 | 10 | — | — | — | — | — |
| 2020–21 | Lehigh Valley Phantoms | AHL | 26 | 2 | 6 | 8 | 2 | — | — | — | — | — |
| 2021–22 | Lehigh Valley Phantoms | AHL | 58 | 0 | 8 | 8 | 14 | — | — | — | — | — |
| 2021–22 | Philadelphia Flyers | NHL | 5 | 0 | 2 | 2 | 2 | — | — | — | — | — |
| 2022–23 | Lehigh Valley Phantoms | AHL | 19 | 1 | 3 | 4 | 8 | — | — | — | — | — |
| 2022–23 | Skellefteå AIK | SHL | 11 | 0 | 4 | 4 | 2 | 17 | 2 | 2 | 4 | 4 |
| 2023–24 | Frölunda HC | SHL | 52 | 3 | 21 | 24 | 8 | 14 | 1 | 6 | 7 | 12 |
| 2024–25 | Frölunda HC | SHL | 44 | 3 | 14 | 17 | 8 | 12 | 1 | 3 | 4 | 2 |
| SHL totals | | | 288 | 15 | 64 | 79 | 50 | 64 | 4 | 15 | 19 | 20 |
| NHL totals | | | 5 | 0 | 2 | 2 | 2 | — | — | — | — | — |

Medal record

Representing Sweden

Ice hockey

World Junior Championships
| Silver medal – second place | 2018 United States | |

=== International ===
| Year | Team | Event | Result | GP | G | A | Pts | PIM |
|---|---|---|---|---|---|---|---|---|
| 2014 | Sweden | U17 | 3rd place, bronze medalist(s) | 6 | 0 | 2 | 2 | 2 |
| 2018 | Sweden | WJC | 2nd place, silver medalist(s) | 7 | 0 | 0 | 0 | 0 |
| Junior totals | | | | 13 | 0 | 2 | 2 | 2 |

== Awards and honours ==
| Award | Year |
|---|---|
SHL
| Le Mat Trophy (Växjö Lakers) | 2018 |
