= Filip Hasa =

Swedish ice hockey player (born 2000)

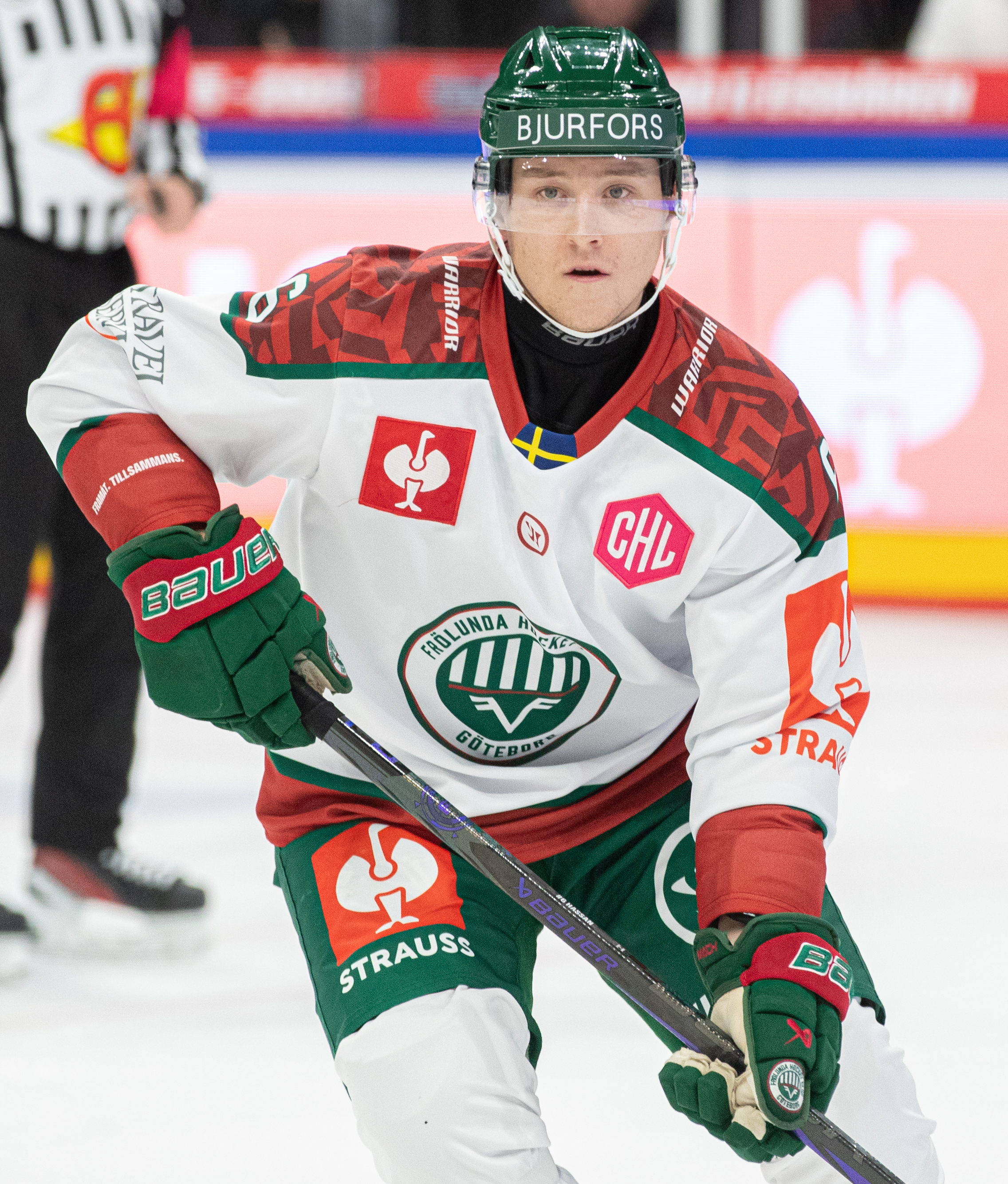
- Born: 11 May 2000 (age 25) Uppsala, Sweden
- Height: 5 ft 10 in (178 cm)
- Weight: 165 lb (75 kg; 11 st 11 lb)
- Position: Defence
- Shoots: Left
- SHL team: Frölunda HC
- Playing career: 2017–present

Filip Hasa (born May 11, 2000) is a Swedish professional ice hockey defenceman for Frölunda HC of the Swedish Hockey League (SHL).

== Playing career ==
Hasa represented Uppland at TV-pucken in 2014 and Gothenburg in 2015 . He joined Frölunda's junior academy for the 2015–16 season. Hasa made his SHL debut during the 2017–18 season. Between 2019 and 2021, Hasa played for Almtuna IS in the Hockeyallsvenskan and before joining Modo Hockey for the 2021–22 season. The following season he returned to Frölunda in the SHL.

During the 2023–24 season, Hasa suffered a whiplash injury after a hit by Olli Palola of Oskarshamn IK on January 25, 2024, and was out of action for the rest of the season.

== Personal life ==
Filip's younger brother Noah also plays for Frölunda in the SHL.

== Career statistics ==
			Regular season					Playoffs
Season	Team	League	GP	G	A	Pts	PIM	GP	G	A	Pts	PIM
2016–17	Frölunda HC	J20	13	0	1	1	4	—	—	—	—	—
2017–18	Frölunda HC	J20	41	9	12	21	12	2	0	0	0	0
2017–18	Frölunda HC	SHL	1	0	0	0	0	—	—	—	—	—
2018–19	Frölunda HC	J20	45	9	11	20	31	6	1	0	1	0
2018–19	Frölunda HC	SHL	6	0	0	0	0	—	—	—	—	—
2019–20	Almtuna IS	Allsv	52	4	14	18	26	—	—	—	—	—
2020–21	Almtuna IS	Allsv	51	6	10	16	14	2	0	1	1	2
2021–22	Modo Hockey	Allsv	52	6	22	28	22	13	0	2	2	2
2022–23	Frölunda HC	SHL	42	1	3	4	33	13	4	2	6	0
2023–24	Frölunda HC	SHL	33	1	9	10	6	—	—	—	—	—
2024–25	Frölunda HC	SHL	38	3	2	5	8	6	0	0	0	0
2025–26	Frölunda HC	SHL	42	2	1	3	16	4	0	0	0	2
SHL totals			162	7	15	22	63	23	4	2	6	2
