= Linus Öberg =

Swedish ice hockey player

- Born: 18 July 2000 (age 26) Vänersborg, Sweden
- Height: 183 cm (6 ft 0 in)
- Weight: 92 kg (203 lb; 14 st 7 lb)
- Position: Winger
- Shoots: Right
- SHL team Former teams: Malmö Redhawks; Örebro HK; Frölunda HC
- NHL draft: 206th overall, 2020; San Jose Sharks
- Playing career: 2019–present

Linus Öberg (born 18 July 2000) is a Swedish professional ice hockey player who currently plays for Malmö Redhawks of the Swedish Hockey League (SHL).

== Playing career ==
He made his SHL debut with Örebro HK during the 2018–19 season. Öberg was drafted by the San Jose Sharks in the seventh round, 206th overall, in the 2020 NHL entry draft.

== Career statistics ==
			Regular season					Playoffs
Season	Team	League	GP	G	A	Pts	PIM	GP	G	A	Pts	PIM
2016–17	Örebro HK	J20	5	1	0	1	0	1	0	0	0	2
2017–18	Örebro HK	J20	8	1	1	2	2	4	1	1	2	0
2018–19	Örebro HK	J20	44	14	16	30	38	4	0	2	2	2
2018–19	Örebro HK	SHL	2	0	0	0	0	—	—	—	—	—
2019–20	Örebro HK	SHL	37	4	4	8	18	—	—	—	—	—
2019–20	Örebro HK	J20	11	12	6	18	10	—	—	—	—	—
2020–21	Örebro HK	SHL	51	13	4	17	12	9	2	1	3	6
2021–22	Örebro HK	SHL	52	17	9	26	18	8	3	1	4	6
2022–23	Örebro HK	SHL	51	13	10	23	14	13	5	6	11	10
2023–24	Frölunda HC	SHL	52	10	7	17	11	10	0	0	0	2
2024–25	Malmö Redhawks	SHL	52	7	3	10	8	8	1	1	2	6
SHL totals			297	64	37	101	81	48	11	9	20	30
