= Jere Innala =

Finnish ice hockey player (born 1998)

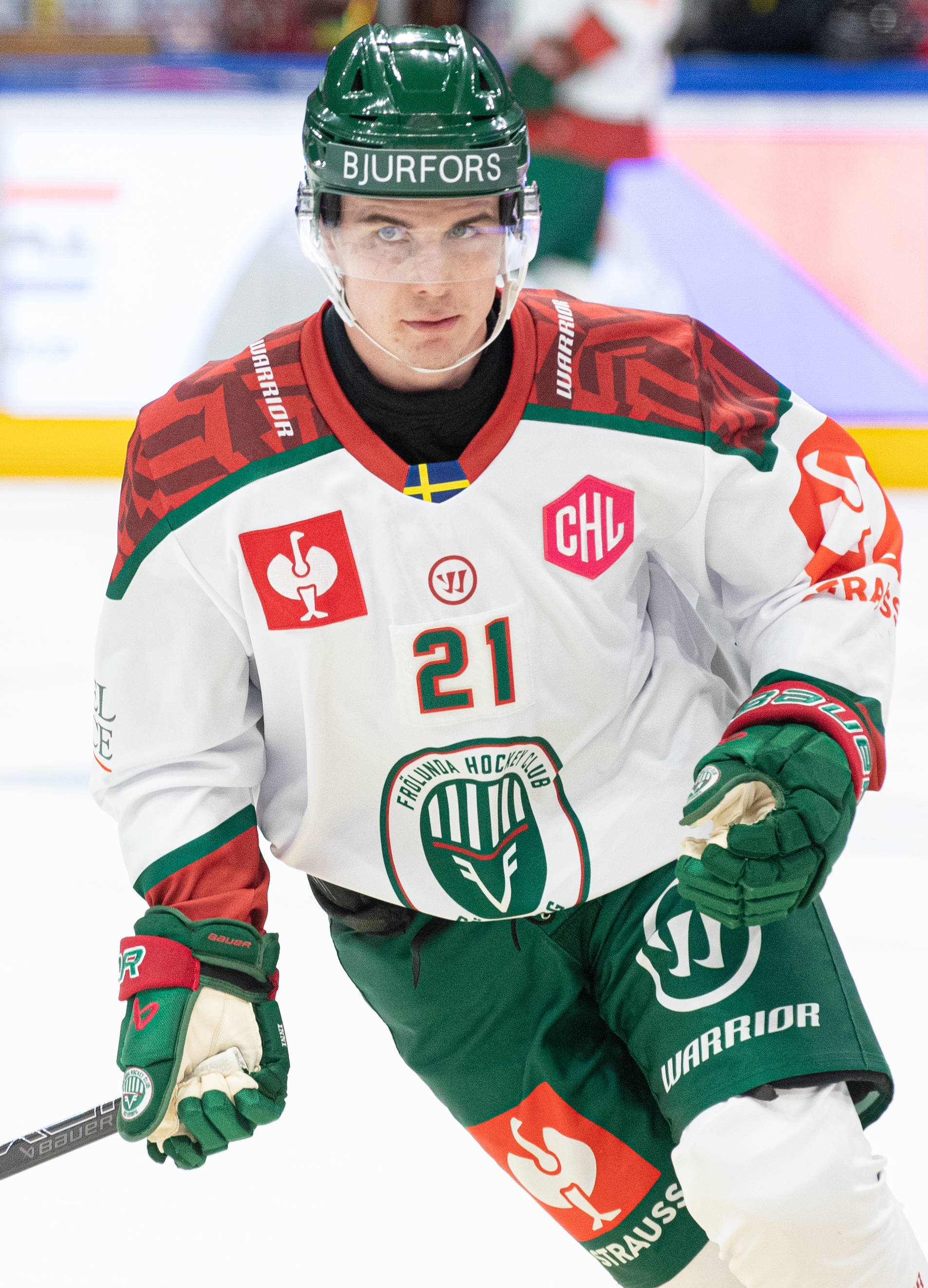
- Born: 17 March 1998 (age 28) Hämeenlinna, Finland
- Height: 5 ft 9 in (175 cm)
- Weight: 183 lb (83 kg; 13 st 1 lb)
- Position: Left wing
- Shoots: Left
- NL team Former teams: HC Lugano; HPK; HIFK; Frölunda HC; Colorado Avalanche
- National team: Finland
- NHL draft: Undrafted
- Playing career: 2017–present

Jere Innala (born 17 March 1998) is a Finnish professional ice hockey player for HC Lugano in the National League (NL) and the Finnish national team.

== Playing career ==
On 7 May 2022, Innala left the Finnish Liiga after six seasons between HPK and HIFK to join Swedish club, Frölunda HC of the Swedish Hockey League (SHL), on a two-year contract.

In the 2022–23 season, Innala made an immediate impact with the Indians, contributing offensively with 10 goals and 26 points through 52 regular-season games. In helping Frölunda return to the playoffs, Innala collected 5 points through 10 postseason games.

Returning for his second year with Frölunda in 2023–24, Innala initially increased his scoring pace, collecting 8 points through the first 8 games before suffering an injury. He was re-signed to an improved two-year contract extension on 9 November 2023, and in returning to the lineup, posted 16 goals and 28 points through 42 regular-season games. In 14 playoff games, Innala added 15 points to lead the SHL skaters in goals and points before the Indians fell in Game 7 of the SHL semifinals to eventual champions Skellefteå AIK.

On 13 June 2024, Innala activated an NHL out-clause in his contract with Frölunda HC, after securing his first contract in North America by signing a one-year, entry-level contract with the Colorado Avalanche. After attending his first training camp in North America, Innala was reassigned by the Avalanche to begin the 2024–25 season with AHL affiliate, the Colorado Eagles. Innala was later recalled and made his NHL debut on December 21, during Colorado's 4–2 win over the Anaheim Ducks. Throughout the season, Innala in a limited fourth-line role went scoreless through 17 games with the Avalanche.

On 5 June 2025, as a pending restricted free agent with the Avalanche, Innala opted to resume his European career by agreeing to return to his former club, Frölunda HC of the SHL, on a one-year deal. In the 2025–26 season, Innala regained his scoring touch in leading the club and team in scoring with 22 goals and 40 points through 48 regular season games. Before the conclusion of the season, Innala was announced to have signed a two-year contract from 2026 to join Swiss club, HC Lugano of the NL, on 11 March 2026.

== International play ==
Medal record

Representing Finland

Ice hockey

World Championships
Gold medal – first place	2022 Finland	
Silver medal – second place	2021 Latvia	

Innala represented Finland at the 2021, 2022 and 2024 IIHF World Championship.

== Career statistics ==
=== Regular season and playoffs ===
			Regular season					Playoffs
Season	Team	League	GP	G	A	Pts	PIM	GP	G	A	Pts	PIM
2015–16	HPK	Jr. A	40	18	17	35	20	7	0	1	1	4
2016–17	HPK	Jr. A	32	17	14	31	24	9	3	2	5	4
2016–17	HPK	Liiga	29	3	2	5	4	1	0	0	0	0
2016–17	LeKi	Mestis	1	0	0	0	0	—	—	—	—	—
2017–18	HPK	Liiga	48	4	7	11	6	—	—	—	—	—
2017–18	LeKi	Mestis	2	0	0	0	0	—	—	—	—	—
2017–18	HPK	Jr. A	—	—	—	—	—	5	0	3	3	0
2018–19	HPK	Liiga	60	24	21	45	16	18	2	9	11	4
2019–20	HPK	Liiga	57	17	18	35	14	—	—	—	—	—
2020–21	HPK	Liiga	42	20	17	37	42	—	—	—	—	—
2021–22	HIFK	Liiga	54	18	30	48	30	6	3	5	8	2
2022–23	Frölunda HC	SHL	52	10	16	26	14	10	2	3	5	0
2023–24	Frölunda HC	SHL	42	16	12	28	14	14	11	4	15	8
2024–25	Colorado Eagles	AHL	43	17	11	28	14	—	—	—	—	—
2024–25	Colorado Avalanche	NHL	17	0	0	0	2	—	—	—	—	—
2025–26	Frölunda HC	SHL	48	22	18	40	16	6	2	1	3	6
Liiga totals			290	86	95	181	112	25	5	14	19	6
SHL totals			142	48	46	94	44	30	15	8	23	14
NHL totals			17	0	0	0	2	—	—	—	—	—

=== International ===
Year	Team	Event	Result	GP	G	A	Pts	PIM
2018	Finland	WJC	6th	5	0	0	0	0
2021	Finland	WC	2nd place, silver medalist(s)	10	2	3	5	2
2022	Finland	WC	1st place, gold medalist(s)	4	0	1	1	2
2024	Finland	WC	8th	8	2	3	5	0
Junior totals				5	0	0	0	0
Senior totals				22	4	7	11	4
