= Jakob Stenqvist =

Swedish ice hockey player

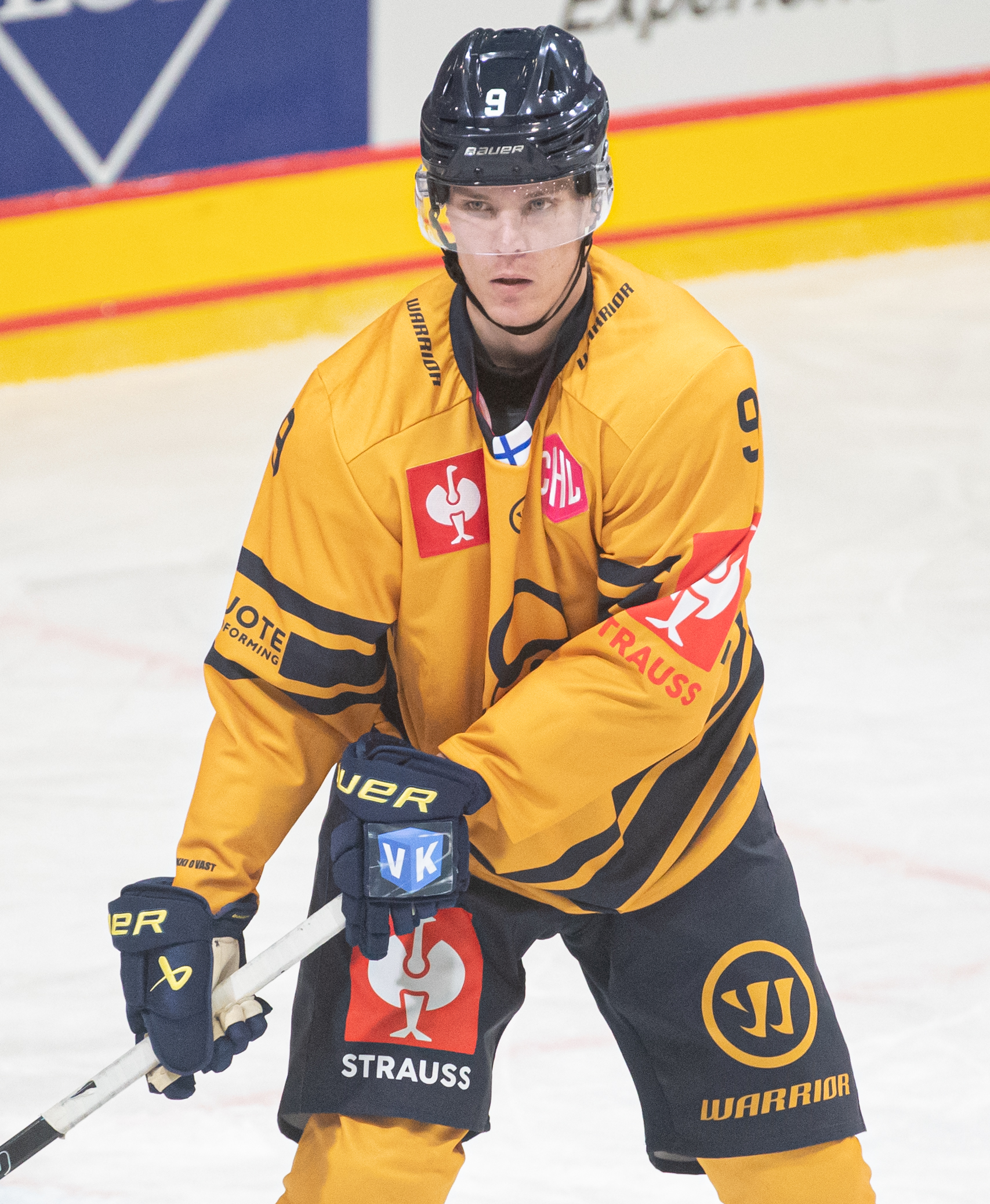
- Stenqvist in 2025
- Born: March 17, 1998 (age 28) Mora, Sweden
- Height: 6 ft 2 in (188 cm)
- Weight: 179 lb (81 kg; 12 st 11 lb)
- Position: Defence
- Shoots: Right
- Liiga team Former teams: Lukko; Frölunda HC; Ässät; Severstal Cherepovets; Timrå IK
- NHL draft: 176th overall, 2016; Dallas Stars
- Playing career: 2017–present

Jakob Stenqvist (born March 17, 1998) is a Swedish professional ice hockey player. He is currently playing for Lukko in the Liiga. He was selected by the Dallas Stars in the sixth-round, 176th overall, of the 2016 NHL entry draft.

== Playing career ==
Stenqvist previously played with Ässät Pori of the Finnish Liiga. After two seasons in the Liiga, Stenqvist moved to the Kontinental Hockey League (KHL) as a free agent and agreed to a one-year contract with Russian club, Severstal Cherepovets, on 1 May 2021.

Following the conclusion of his contract with Severstal, Stenqvist left the KHL and returned to the SHL in agreeing to a one-year deal with Timrå IK on 26 April 2022.
