= Lars Johansson (ice hockey) =

Swedish ice hockey player (born 1987)

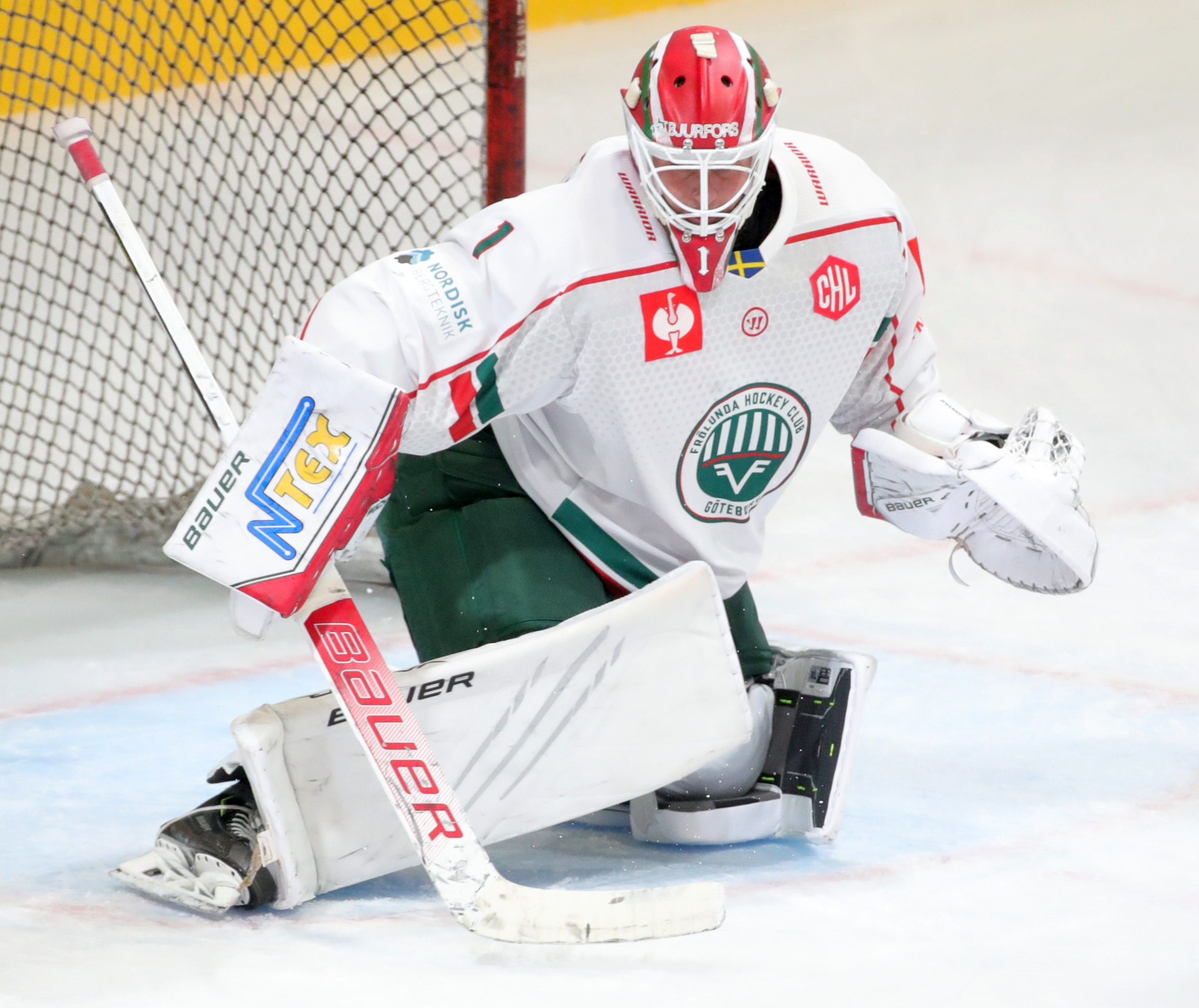
- Lars Johansson in September 2022
- Born: 11 July 1987 (age 39) Avesta, Sweden
- Height: 185 cm (6 ft 1 in)
- Weight: 90 kg (198 lb; 14 st 2 lb)
- Position: Goaltender
- Catches: Left
- SHL team Former teams: Frölunda HC; Mora IK; CSKA Moscow; SKA Saint Petersburg
- National team: Sweden
- NHL draft: Undrafted
- Playing career: 2007–present

Lars Johansson (born 11 July 1987) is a Swedish professional ice hockey goaltender currently playing for Frölunda HC of the Swedish Hockey League (SHL). His brother, Martin, is a skier and orienteer.

== Playing career ==
Johansson played in his native Sweden in the Swedish Hockey League with Mora IK and Frölunda HC. In the 2015–16 season with Frölunda, his third season as the club's starting goaltender, Johansson led the league in Goals against average and save percentage. He backstopped the Indians to the SHL championship, completing the double in having claimed the Champions Hockey League before the season.

On 23 May 2016, Johansson signed as an undrafted free agent to a one-year contract with the Chicago Blackhawks of the National Hockey League. In the 2016–17 season, his first on North American soil, Johansson was assigned to AHL affiliate, the Rockford IceHogs. After 16 games with the IceHogs, Johansson was called up to backup Scott Darling after Corey Crawford's appendectomy on 4 December 2016. He was returned without making an NHL appearance and played out the remainder of the season with the IceHogs.

On 3 July 2017, Johansson left the Blackhawks organization in agreeing to a one-year deal with Russian club, CSKA Moscow of the Kontinental Hockey League (KHL).

After five seasons in the KHL between CSKA and SKA Saint Petersburg, Johansson left Russia following the 2021–22 season and returned to his previous club, Frölunda HC of the SHL, in agreeing to a three-year contract on 13 May 2022.

== Awards and honors ==
Award	Year	Ref
SHL
Le Mat Trophy (Frölunda HC)	2016	
Goaltender of the Year	2016	
CHL
Champions (Frölunda HC)	2016, 2026	
KHL
Best GAA (1.31)	2018	
All-Star Game	2019	
Gagarin Cup (CSKA Moscow)	2019	
