= 2023–24 SHL season =

- League: Swedish Hockey League
- Sport: Ice hockey
- Duration: September 2023 – March 2024; (Regular season); From March 2024; (Playoffs)

Regular season
- First place: Färjestad BK
- Top scorer: Oscar Lindberg (Skellefteå AIK)
- Relegated to HockeyAllsvenskan: IK Oskarshamn

Playoffs
- Playoffs MVP: Linus Söderström (Skellefteå AIK)
- Finals champions: Skellefteå AIK
- Runners-up: Rögle BK

SHL seasons
- 2022–23 2024–25

The 2023–24 SHL season was the 49th season of the Swedish Hockey League (SHL). The regular season began in September 2023 and ended in March 2024, where it was followed by the playoffs and the relegation playoffs.

Färjestad BK won their first regular season title since 2018–19; a 4–5 overtime loss to Frölunda HC on 9 March 2024, gave them an unassailable tally of 103 points with a round to spare. They were unable to add the subsequent playoff title, as they were swept 0–4 in the quarter-finals by Rögle BK. Rögle BK made it all the way to the finals, the first team to do so having started in the eighth-finals, but Skellefteå AIK won the Le Mat Trophy with a 4–1 series victory, their first playoff title since 2013–14.

IK Oskarshamn were relegated to the HockeyAllsvenskan, as HV71 won the Play Out 4–3.

== Teams ==
SHL team map

The league consists of 14 teams; MoDo Hockey returned to the SHL after seven seasons in the HockeyAllsvenskan, where they won the 2022–23 title. Brynäs IF were relegated to the HockeyAllsvenskan at the end of the previous season, and as a result, Färjestad BK is now the only team to have constantly played in the SHL (formerly Elitserien) since its inception in 1975.

Team	City	Arena	Capacity
Frölunda HC	Gothenburg	Scandinavium	12,044
Färjestad BK	Karlstad	Löfbergs Arena	8,647
HV71	Jönköping	Husqvarna Garden	7,000
Leksands IF	Leksand	Tegera Arena	7,650
Linköping HC	Linköping	Saab Arena	8,500
Luleå HF	Luleå	Coop Norrbotten Arena	6,300
Malmö Redhawks	Malmö	Malmö Arena	12,600
MoDo Hockey	Örnsköldsvik	Hägglunds Arena	7,265
IK Oskarshamn	Oskarshamn	Be-Ge Hockey Center	3,275
Rögle BK	Ängelholm	Catena Arena	6,310
Skellefteå AIK	Skellefteå	Skellefteå Kraft Arena	6,001
Timrå IK	Timrå	NHC Arena	6,000
Växjö Lakers	Växjö	Vida Arena	5,700
Örebro HK	Örebro	Behrn Arena	5,500

== Regular season ==
Each team played 52 games, playing each of the other thirteen teams four times: twice on home ice, and twice away from home. Points were awarded for each game, where three points were awarded for winning in regulation time, two points for winning in overtime or shootout, one point for losing in overtime or shootout, and zero points for losing in regulation time. At the end of the regular season, the team that finished with the most points was crowned the league champion.

The top two teams in the regular season – Färjestad BK and the Växjö Lakers – qualified for the 2024–25 Champions Hockey League.

=== Standings ===
Pos	Team	Pld	W	OTW	OTL	L	GF	GA	GD	Pts	Qualification
1	Färjestad BK	52	30	3	8	11	176	123	+53	104	Qualification to Quarter-finals
2	Växjö Lakers	52	29	4	4	15	162	110	+52	99	Qualification to Quarter-finals
3	Skellefteå AIK	52	27	6	4	15	154	111	+43	97	Qualification to Quarter-finals
4	Frölunda HC	52	24	10	4	14	144	119	+25	96	Qualification to Quarter-finals
5	Leksands IF	52	27	3	5	17	149	123	+26	92	Qualification to Quarter-finals
6	Linköping HC	52	23	4	8	17	152	146	+6	85	Qualification to Quarter-finals
7	Luleå HF	52	21	7	3	21	130	116	+14	80	Qualification to Eighth-finals
8	Timrå IK	52	22	3	8	19	133	137	−4	80	Qualification to Eighth-finals
9	Rögle BK	52	17	7	5	23	117	133	−16	70	Qualification to Eighth-finals
10	Örebro HK	52	14	9	7	22	115	138	−23	67	Qualification to Eighth-finals
11	Modo Hockey	52	15	8	6	23	130	162	−32	67	
12	Malmö Redhawks	52	16	5	7	24	138	150	−12	65	
13	HV71	52	13	5	4	30	130	175	−45	53	Qualification to Play Out
14	IK Oskarshamn (R)	52	8	4	5	35	110	197	−87	37	Qualification to Play Out

Source: SHL.se
Rules for classification: 1) Points; 2) Goal difference; 3) Number of goals scored
(R) Relegated

=== Statistics ===
==== Scoring leaders ====
The following shows the top ten players who led the league in points, at the conclusion of the regular season. If two or more skaters are tied (i.e. same number of points, goals and played games), all of the tied skaters are shown.

Player	Team	GP	G	A	Pts	+/–	PIM
(Sweden) Oscar Lindberg	Skellefteå AIK	50	18	33	51	+7	56
(Canada) Ty Rattie	Linköping HC	52	21	26	47	−3	18
(Czech Republic) David Tomášek	Färjestad BK	52	25	20	45	+8	20
(Finland) Janne Kuokkanen	Malmö Redhawks	43	18	26	44	+5	12
(Sweden) Max Friberg	Frölunda HC	51	16	27	43	+6	4
(Sweden) Jonathan Pudas	Skellefteå AIK	50	12	30	42	−4	24
(Sweden) Marcus Sylvegård	Växjö Lakers	51	23	18	41	+21	10
(Sweden) Victor Ejdsell	Färjestad BK	50	20	21	41	+17	49
(United States) Broc Little	Linköping HC	52	17	24	41	+8	8
(Sweden) Malte Strömwall	Frölunda HC	52	15	25	40	+7	47

==== Leading goaltenders ====
The following shows the top ten goaltenders who led the league in goals against average, provided that they had played at least 40% of their team's minutes, at the conclusion of the regular season.

Player	Team	GP	TOI	W	L	GA	SO	Sv%	GAA
(Sweden) Filip Larsson	Leksands IF	28	1640:36 (Note: Larsson is recognised as having played 1614:36 by the Swedish Ice Hockey Association, and 1640:36 by the Swedish Hockey League, with the 26-minute discrepancy due to Larsson replacing Mantas Armalis, following a match misconduct in a game against IK Oskarshamn on 27 February 2024.)	19	9	52	5	92.00	1.90
(Sweden) Matteus Ward	Luleå HF	33	1887:39	18	14	60	5	91.04	1.91
(Sweden) Lars Johansson	Frölunda HC	40	2279:54	27	11	77	3	92.04	2.03
(Sweden) Linus Söderström	Skellefteå AIK	36	2073:27	23	12	70	3	91.27	2.03
(Finland) Emil Larmi	Växjö Lakers	34	2026:05	20	13	71	4	91.30	2.10
(Sweden) Carl Lindbom	Färjestad BK	26	1469:11	17	7	52	2	91.13	2.12
(Sweden) Christoffer Rifalk	Rögle BK	36	2100:28	17	19	79	5	90.33	2.26
(Sweden) Jacob Johansson	Timrå IK	35	2047:28	16	18	83	3	89.87	2.43
(Sweden) Marcus Högberg	Linköping HC	40	2363:30 (Note: Högberg is recognised as having played 2363:30 by the Swedish Ice Hockey Association, and 2358:30 by the Swedish Hockey League, with the five-minute discrepancy due to overtime in the Linköping–HV71 game on 14 September 2023.)	21	18	99	4	91.41	2.51
(Lithuania) Mantas Armalis	Leksands IF	25	1464:12	11	13	62	2	89.89	2.54

== Playoffs ==
Ten teams qualify for the playoffs: the top six teams in the regular season have a bye to the quarter-finals, while teams ranked seventh to tenth meet each other (7 versus 10, 8 versus 9) in a preliminary playoff round.

=== Format ===
In the first round, the 7th-ranked team meets the 10th-ranked team and the 8th-ranked team meets the 9th-ranked team for a place in the second round. In the second round, the top-ranked team will meet the lowest-ranked winner of the first round, the second-ranked team will face the other winner of the first round, the third-ranked team will face the sixth-ranked team, and the fourth-ranked team will face the fifth-ranked team. In the third round, the highest remaining seed is matched against the lowest remaining seed. In each round the higher-seeded team is awarded home advantage. The meetings are in the first round played as best-of-three series, and in the later rounds as best-of-seven series. In the eighth-finals, the higher-seeded teams play at home for game 2 (plus 3 if necessary) while the lower-seeded teams play at home for game 1. In the later rounds, the higher-seeded teams are at home for games 1 and 2 (plus 5 and 7 if necessary) while the lower-seeded teams are at home for games 3 and 4 (plus 6 if necessary).

=== Playoff bracket ===
Eighth-finals; Swedish: Åttondelsfinal
7	Luleå HF	2
10	Örebro HK	1
8	Timrå IK	0
9	Rögle BK	2

Quarter-finals; Swedish: Kvartsfinal
1	Färjestad BK	0
9	Rögle BK	4
2	Växjö Lakers	4
7	Luleå HF	0
3	Skellefteå AIK	4
6	Linköping HC	0
4	Frölunda HC	4
5	Leksands IF	3

Semi-finals
2	Växjö Lakers	0
9	Rögle BK	4
(Pairings are re-seeded after the first and second round)
3	Skellefteå AIK	4
4	Frölunda HC	3

Finals
9	Rögle BK	1
3	Skellefteå AIK	4

=== Eighth-finals ===
==== (7) Luleå HF vs. (10) Örebro HK ====
14 March	Örebro HK	2–1	Luleå HF	Behrn Arena	Recap
No scoring		First period	No scoring
Danick Martel (1) – 6:20		Second period	9:05 – Oskari Laaksonen (1)
Samuel Johannesson (1) – 14:30		Third period	No scoring
Jonas Arntzen (25 shots / 24 saves)		Goalie stats	Joel Lassinantti (19 shots / 17 saves)

16 March	Luleå HF	3–0	Örebro HK	Coop Norrbotten Arena	Recap
No scoring		First period	No scoring
Jack Connolly (1) – 0:49; Jack Connolly (2) – 4:20; Juhani Tyrväinen (1) – 9:57		Second period	No scoring
No scoring		Third period	No scoring
Joel Lassinantti (12 shots / 12 saves)		Goalie stats	Jonas Arntzen (31 shots / 28 saves)

18 March	Luleå HF	1–0	OT	Örebro HK	Coop Norrbotten Arena	Recap
No scoring		First period		No scoring
No scoring		Second period		No scoring
No scoring		Third period		No scoring
Juhani Tyrväinen (2; PPG) – 12:29		First overtime period		No scoring
Joel Lassinantti (16 shots / 16 saves)		Goalie stats		Jonas Arntzen (43 shots / 42 saves)

Luleå HF win series 2–1

==== (8) Timrå IK vs. (9) Rögle BK ====
14 March	Rögle BK	4–1	Timrå IK	Catena Arena	Recap
No scoring		First period	15:33 – Filip Hållander (1)
Daniel Zaar (1; PPG) – 8:07; Albin Sundsvik (1) – 16:24		Second period	No scoring
Rodrigo Ābols (1) – 17:39; Brady Ferguson (1; ENG) – 17:59		Third period	No scoring
Christoffer Rifalk (30 shots / 29 saves)		Goalie stats	Jacob Johansson (24 shots / 21 saves)

16 March	Timrå IK	2–3	Rögle BK	NHC Arena	Recap
No scoring		First period	6:06 – Dennis Everberg (1); 7:47 – Albin Sundsvik (2; PPG)
No scoring		Second period	5:34 – Axel Smeds (1)
Jonathan Dahlén (1; PPG/EA) – 14:45; Magnus Pääjärvi (1; PPG/EA) – 17:08		Third period	No scoring
Jacob Johansson (11 shots / 8 saves)		Goalie stats	Christoffer Rifalk (43 shots / 41 saves)

Rögle BK win series 2–0

=== Quarter-finals ===
==== (1) Färjestad BK vs. (9) Rögle BK ====
With their defeat in a series sweep, Färjestad BK became the first No. 1 seed since HV71 in 2010–11 (and third overall) to lose in the quarter-finals in such a manner. Rögle BK became the third team to make the semi-finals, having started the playoffs in the eighth-finals.

21 March	Färjestad BK	2–6	Rögle BK	Löfbergs Arena	Recap
Joel Kellman (1) – 12:43		First period	No scoring
No scoring		Second period	7:18 – Dennis Everberg (2); 11:29 – Dennis Everberg (3); 12:33 – Rodrigo Ābols (2; SHG); 17:32 – Linus Sandin (1); 19:22 – Linus Sandin (2; PPG)
August Tornberg (1; SHG) – 8:11		Third period	14:09 – Daniel Zaar (2)
Carl Lindbom (20 shots / 15 saves); Maxime Lagacé (7 shots / 6 saves)		Goalie stats	Christoffer Rifalk (25 shots / 23 saves)

23 March	Färjestad BK	0–3	Rögle BK	Löfbergs Arena	Recap
No scoring		First period	9:07 – Brandon Davidson (1; PPG); 14:26 – Daniel Zaar (3; PPG)
No scoring		Second period	No scoring
No scoring		Third period	19:47 – Linus Sandin (3; ENG)
Carl Lindbom (34 shots / 32 saves)		Goalie stats	Christoffer Rifalk (19 shots / 19 saves)

25 March	Rögle BK	3–2	3OT	Färjestad BK	Catena Arena	Recap
No scoring		First period		No scoring
Daniel Zaar (4; PPG) – 9:20; Rodrigo Ābols (3; PPG) – 11:38		Second period		8:45 – David Tomášek (1)
No scoring		Third period		6:55 – Lucas Forsell (1)
Michael Kapla (1) – 8:39		Third overtime period		No scoring
Christoffer Rifalk (53 shots / 51 saves)		Goalie stats		Carl Lindbom (43 shots / 40 saves)

27 March	Rögle BK	2–1	OT	Färjestad BK	Catena Arena	Recap
No scoring		First period		No scoring
No scoring		Second period		7:28 – Henrik Björklund (1)
Daniel Zaar (5; EA) – 17:46		Third period		No scoring
Henry Bowlby (1) – 4:52		First overtime period		No scoring
Christoffer Rifalk (27 shots / 26 saves)		Goalie stats		Carl Lindbom (29 shots / 27 saves)

Rögle BK win series 4–0

==== (2) Växjö Lakers vs. (7) Luleå HF ====
21 March	Växjö Lakers	5–3	Luleå HF	Vida Arena	Recap
Manuel Ågren (1) – 12:24		First period	4:21 – Frédéric Allard (1)
Noah Östlund (1; PPG) – 16:28		Second period	No scoring
Manuel Ågren (2) – 3:26; Robert Rosén (1) – 15:32; Hugo Gustafsson (1; ENG) – 18:12		Third period	1:00 – Pontus Andreasson (1); 4:33 – Juhani Tyrväinen (3; PPG)
Emil Larmi (20 shots / 17 saves)		Goalie stats	Joel Lassinantti (24 shots / 20 saves)

23 March	Växjö Lakers	2–1	Luleå HF	Vida Arena	Recap
Robert Rosén (2; PPG) – 4:54		First period	13:18 – Erik Gustafsson (1)
Hugo Gustafsson (2) – 16:46		Second period	No scoring
No scoring		Third period	No scoring
Emil Larmi (19 shots / 18 saves)		Goalie stats	Matteus Ward (40 shots / 38 saves)

25 March	Luleå HF	2–3	Växjö Lakers	Coop Norrbotten Arena	Recap
No scoring		First period	14:24 – Keegan Lowe (1)
Oskari Laaksonen (2) – 11:46		Second period	12:20 – Gabriel Carlsson (1); 18:19 – Ludvig Nilsson (1)
Brendan Shinnimin (1; EA) – 19:18		Third period	No scoring
Joel Lassinantti (25 shots / 22 saves)		Goalie stats	Emil Larmi (18 shots / 16 saves)

27 March	Luleå HF	1–2	OT	Växjö Lakers	Coop Norrbotten Arena	Recap
No scoring		First period		8:43 – Emil Sylvegård (1)
Jesper Sellgren (1) – 14:18		Second period		No scoring
No scoring		Third period		No scoring
No scoring		First overtime period		11:44 – Kalle Kossila (1)
Matteus Ward (21 shots / 19 saves)		Goalie stats		Emil Larmi (35 shots / 34 saves)

Växjö Lakers win series 4–0

==== (3) Skellefteå AIK vs. (6) Linköping HC ====
22 March	Skellefteå AIK	4–3	OT	Linköping HC	Skellefteå Kraft Arena	Recap
Elias Salomonsson (1) – 0:33; Dylan Sikura (1) – 2:24; Rickard Hugg (1) – 3:06		First period		9:30 – Sebastian Strandberg (1)
No scoring		Second period		0:25 – Linus Hultström (1)
No scoring		Third period		17:44 – Broc Little (1; PPG)
Filip Sandberg (1; PPG) – 7:33		First overtime period		No scoring
Linus Söderström (37 shots / 34 saves)		Goalie stats		Jesper Myrenberg (39 shots / 35 saves)

24 March	Skellefteå AIK	3–2	2OT	Linköping HC	Skellefteå Kraft Arena	Recap
Linus Lindström (1) – 14:58		First period		No scoring
No scoring		Second period		No scoring
Filip Sandberg (2; PPG) – 3:44		Third period		1:52 – Ty Rattie (1; PPG); 7:14 – Broc Little (2; PPG)
Dylan Sikura (2) – 0:20		Second overtime period		No scoring
Linus Söderström (33 shots / 31 saves)		Goalie stats		Jesper Myrenberg (29 shots / 26 saves)

26 March	Linköping HC	3–4	3OT	Skellefteå AIK	Saab Arena	Recap
No scoring		First period		18:40 – Dylan Sikura (3)
No scoring		Second period		9:39 – Oskar Nilsson (1); 13:29 – Jonathan Johnson (1; PPG)
Oscar Fantenberg (1) – 4:00; Filip Bystedt (1) – 8:35; Vilmos Galló (1) – 12:28		Third period		No scoring
No scoring		Third overtime period		16:23 – Axel Sandin Pellikka (1; PPG)
Jesper Myrenberg (46 shots / 42 saves)		Goalie stats		Linus Söderström (48 shots / 45 saves)

28 March	Linköping HC	0–2	Skellefteå AIK	Saab Arena	Recap
No scoring		First period	No scoring
No scoring		Second period	No scoring
No scoring		Third period	14:57 – Andreas Johnsson (1); 17:10 – Arvid Lundberg (1; ENG)
Jesper Myrenberg (19 shots / 18 saves)		Goalie stats	Linus Söderström (31 shots / 31 saves)

Skellefteå AIK win series 4–0

==== (4) Frölunda HC vs. (5) Leksands IF ====
22 March	Frölunda HC	1–2	OT	Leksands IF	Scandinavium	Recap
No scoring		First period		No scoring
Malte Strömwall (1) – 8:40		Second period		11:28 – Martin Karlsson (1)
No scoring		Third period		No scoring
No scoring		First overtime period		12:47 – Max Véronneau (1)
Lars Johansson (24 shots / 22 saves)		Goalie stats		Filip Larsson (26 shots / 25 saves)

24 March	Frölunda HC	4–2	Leksands IF	Scandinavium	Recap
Max Friberg (1; PPG) – 4:06		First period	No scoring
Tom Nilsson (1) – 3:16		Second period	5:25 – Lukas Vejdemo (1)
Mikael Ruohomaa (1) – 14:12; Linus Nässén (1; ENG) – 19:44		Third period	13:05 – Peter Cehlárik (1)
Lars Johansson (30 shots / 28 saves)		Goalie stats	Mantas Armalis (25 shots / 22 saves)

26 March	Leksands IF	1–2	Frölunda HC	Tegera Arena	Recap
No scoring		First period	6:37 – Jere Innala (1; PPG)
No scoring		Second period	3:03 – Pontus Johansson (1)
Anton Johansson (1; EA) – 19:00		Third period	No scoring
Mantas Armalis (10 shots / 8 saves)		Goalie stats	Lars Johansson (24 shots / 23 saves)

28 March	Leksands IF	2–0	Frölunda HC	Tegera Arena	Recap
No scoring		First period	No scoring
Anton Lindholm (1) – 15:40		Second period	No scoring
Kalle Östman (1; ENG) – 18:50		Third period	No scoring
Filip Larsson (23 shots / 23 saves)		Goalie stats	Lars Johansson (23 shots / 22 saves)

30 March	Frölunda HC	5–2	Leksands IF	Scandinavium	Recap
Jere Innala (2) – 14:07		First period	No scoring
Isac Born (1) – 5:04; Jere Innala (3) – 17:45		Second period	2:16 – Oskar Lang (1; PPG)
Christian Folin (1) – 6:21; Noah Hasa (1; ENG) – 19:08		Third period	17:04 – Oskar Lang (2; PPG/EA)
Lars Johansson (22 shots / 20 saves)		Goalie stats	Filip Larsson (30 shots / 26 saves)

1 April	Leksands IF	5–2	Frölunda HC	Tegera Arena	Recap
Patrik Norén (1) – 14:13		First period	7:53 – Jere Innala (4)
Matt Caito (1) – 0:27; Felix Unger Sörum (1; PPG) – 18:01		Second period	No scoring
Max Véronneau (2) – 6:17; Anton Johansson (2; PPG) – 17:17		Third period	13:39 – Jayden Halbgewachs (1)
Filip Larsson (30 shots / 28 saves)		Goalie stats	Lars Johansson (26 shots / 21 saves)

3 April	Frölunda HC	3–2	OT	Leksands IF	Scandinavium	Recap
No scoring		First period		No scoring
Jere Innala (4; PPG) – 13:50		Second period		16:45 – Lukas Vejdemo (2)
Erik Thorell (1) – 13:59		Third period		16:53 – Olle Alsing (1)
Mikael Ruohomaa (2) – 4:08		First overtime period		No scoring
Lars Johansson (24 shots / 22 saves)		Goalie stats		Filip Larsson (32 shots / 29 saves)

Frölunda HC win series 4–3

=== Semi-finals ===
==== (2) Växjö Lakers vs. (9) Rögle BK ====
With their series victory, Rögle BK became the first team to make the finals having started in the eighth-finals.

5 April	Växjö Lakers	1–2	OT	Rögle BK	Vida Arena	Recap
No scoring		First period		No scoring
Zach Giuttari (1) – 13:54		Second period		No scoring
No scoring		Third period		4:21 – Rodrigo Ābols (4)
No scoring		First overtime period		7:30 – Adam Tambellini (1)
Emil Larmi (27 shots / 25 saves)		Goalie stats		Christoffer Rifalk (35 shots / 34 saves)

7 April	Växjö Lakers	2–4	Rögle BK	Vida Arena	Recap
No scoring		First period	18:25 – Simon Zether (1)
Robert Rosén (3) – 1:41		Second period	2:53 – Linus Sjödin (1)
Joachim Blichfeld (1) – 1:37		Third period	1:09 – Simon Ryfors (1); 19:47 – Linus Sandin (4; ENG)
Emil Larmi (19 shots / 16 saves)		Goalie stats	Christoffer Rifalk (35 shots / 33 saves)

9 April	Rögle BK	3–2	2OT	Växjö Lakers	Catena Arena	Recap
Rodrigo Ābols (5; PPG) – 3:21		First period		No scoring
Linus Sandin (5; PPG) – 11:56		Second period		13:19 – Filip Eriksson (1)
No scoring		Third period		15:55 – Filip Eriksson (2)
Lucas Ekeståhl-Jonsson (1; PPG) – 3:34		Second overtime period		No scoring
Christoffer Rifalk (36 shots / 34 saves)		Goalie stats		Emil Larmi (29 shots / 26 saves)

11 April	Rögle BK	4–2	Växjö Lakers	Catena Arena	Recap
No scoring		First period	12:08 – Brian Cooper (1); 16:52 – Manuel Ågren (3)
Adam Tambellini (2) – 9:12		Second period	No scoring
Simon Ryfors (2; PPG) – 2:39; Daniel Zaar (6; PPG) – 8:50; Daniel Zaar (7; ENG) – 18:35		Third period	No scoring
Christoffer Rifalk (34 shots / 32 saves)		Goalie stats	Emil Larmi (24 shots / 21 saves)

Rögle BK win series 4–0

==== (3) Skellefteå AIK vs. (4) Frölunda HC ====
6 April	Skellefteå AIK	5–2	Frölunda HC	Skellefteå Kraft Arena	Recap
Jonathan Johnson (2) – 2:37; Linus Lindström (2) – 8:27		First period	No scoring
Rickard Hugg (2) – 9:09; Mārtiņš Dzierkals (1) – 10:08; Zeb Forsfjäll (1) – 13:59		Second period	4:49 – Nicklas Lasu (1); 8:01 – Malte Strömwall (2)
No scoring		Third period	No scoring
Linus Söderström (32 shots / 30 saves)		Goalie stats	Lars Johansson (14 shots / 9 saves); Frans Tuohimaa (8 shots / 8 saves)

8 April	Skellefteå AIK	3–2	OT	Frölunda HC	Skellefteå Kraft Arena	Recap
Rickard Hugg (3) – 7:20		First period		No scoring
Anton Heikkinen (1) – 10:41		Second period		No scoring
No scoring		Third period		4:46 – Malte Strömwall (3); 6:20 – Jere Innala (6)
Oscar Lindberg (1) – 6:57		First overtime period		No scoring
Linus Söderström (32 shots / 30 saves)		Goalie stats		Frans Tuohimaa (34 shots / 31 saves)

10 April	Frölunda HC	2–0	Skellefteå AIK	Scandinavium	Recap
No scoring		First period	No scoring
No scoring		Second period	No scoring
Tom Nilsson (2) – 17:45; Max Friberg (2; ENG) – 19:58		Third period	No scoring
Lars Johansson (30 shots / 30 saves)		Goalie stats	Gustaf Lindvall (22 shots / 21 saves)

12 April	Frölunda HC	6–7	OT	Skellefteå AIK	Scandinavium	Recap
Jere Innala (7; PPG) – 6:50; Tom Nilsson (3) – 9:28		First period		1:38 – Jonathan Johnson (3); 8:36 – Linus Lindström (3)
Max Friberg (3) – 8:04		Second period		1:03 – Axel Sandin Pellikka (2); 8:17 – Rickard Hugg (4)
Jere Innala (8; PPG) – 1:44; Albin Sundin (1) – 9:11; Mikael Ruohomaa (3; EA) – 18:02		Third period		6:03 – Jonathan Johnson (4; PPG); 8:26 – Pär Lindholm (1)
No scoring		First overtime period		16:09 – Andreas Johnsson (2; PPG)
Lars Johansson (34 shots / 27 saves)		Goalie stats		Gustaf Lindvall (39 shots / 33 saves)

14 April	Skellefteå AIK	3–4	OT	Frölunda HC	Skellefteå Kraft Arena	Recap
No scoring		First period		11:45 – Isac Heens (1); 18:56 – Jere Innala (9)
No scoring		Second period		10:59 – David Edstrom (1)
Simon Robertsson (1) – 2:40; Dylan Sikura (4; PPG) – 10:49; Filip Sandberg (3; PPG) – 16:00		Third period		No scoring
No scoring		First overtime period		10:33 – Linus Högberg (1)
Linus Söderström (25 shots / 21 saves)		Goalie stats		Lars Johansson (32 shots / 29 saves)

16 April	Frölunda HC	3–1	Skellefteå AIK	Scandinavium	Recap
No scoring		First period	No scoring
David Edstrom (2; PPG) – 1:04		Second period	No scoring
Max Friberg (4) – 9:42; Jere Innala (10) – 17:31		Third period	7:20 – Jonathan Johnson (5)
Lars Johansson (21 shots / 20 saves)		Goalie stats	Linus Söderström (30 shots / 27 saves)

18 April	Skellefteå AIK	4–1	Frölunda HC	Skellefteå Kraft Arena	Recap
Jonathan Johnson (6; PPG) – 2:28; Mārtiņš Dzierkals (2) – 9:37		First period	6:26 – Jere Innala (11)
Linus Lindström (4; PPG) – 16:24		Second period	No scoring
Max Lindholm (1; ENG) – 17:02		Third period	No scoring
Linus Söderström (22 shots / 21 saves)		Goalie stats	Lars Johansson (25 shots / 22 saves)

Skellefteå AIK win series 4–3

=== Finals ===
==== (3) Skellefteå AIK vs. (9) Rögle BK ====
20 April	Skellefteå AIK	1–0	Rögle BK	Skellefteå Kraft Arena	Recap
No scoring		First period	No scoring
No scoring		Second period	No scoring
Linus Lindström (5) – 15:44		Third period	No scoring
Linus Söderström (30 shots / 30 saves)		Goalie stats	Christoffer Rifalk (24 shots / 23 saves)

22 April	Skellefteå AIK	0–1	Rögle BK	Skellefteå Kraft Arena	Recap
No scoring		First period	No scoring
No scoring		Second period	No scoring
No scoring		Third period	10:30 – Lian Bichsel (1)
Linus Söderström (22 shots / 21 saves)		Goalie stats	Christoffer Rifalk (27 shots / 27 saves)

25 April	Rögle BK	2–3	Skellefteå AIK	Catena Arena	Recap
Albin Sundsvik (3) – 14:43		First period	14:34 – Pär Lindholm (2)
No scoring		Second period	No scoring
Anton Bengtsson (1) – 14:52		Third period	5:21 – Arvid Lundberg (2); 16:54 – Max Lindholm (2; PPG)
Christoffer Rifalk (23 shots / 20 saves)		Goalie stats	Linus Söderström (30 shots / 28 saves)

27 April	Rögle BK	1–2	OT	Skellefteå AIK	Catena Arena	Recap
No scoring		First period		No scoring
Anton Bengtsson (2; PPG) – 15:54		Second period		2:31 – Andreas Johnsson (3)
No scoring		Third period		No scoring
No scoring		First overtime period		12:20 – Andreas Johnsson (4)
Christoffer Rifalk (33 shots / 31 saves)		Goalie stats		Linus Söderström (37 shots / 36 saves)

29 April	Skellefteå AIK	2–0	Rögle BK	Skellefteå Kraft Arena	Recap
No scoring		First period	No scoring
Andreas Johnsson (5; PPG) – 9:08		Second period	No scoring
Max Lindholm (3; ENG) – 19:07		Third period	No scoring
Linus Söderström (19 shots / 19 saves)		Goalie stats	Christoffer Rifalk (39 shots / 38 saves)

Skellefteå AIK win series 4–1

=== Statistics ===
==== Scoring leaders ====
The following players led the league in points, at the conclusion of the playoffs. If two or more skaters are tied (i.e. same number of points, goals and played games), all of the tied skaters are shown.

Player	Team	GP	G	A	Pts	+/–	PIM
(Finland) Jere Innala	Frölunda HC	14	11	4	15	+9	8
(Latvia) Rodrigo Ābols	Rögle BK	15	5	7	12	+1	2
(Sweden) Dennis Everberg	Rögle BK	15	3	8	11	+2	35
(Sweden) Jonathan Johnson	Skellefteå AIK	16	6	4	10	+6	8
(Sweden) Linus Sandin	Rögle BK	15	5	5	10	+3	4
(Sweden) Malte Strömwall	Frölunda HC	14	3	7	10	+2	12
(Sweden) Oscar Lindberg	Skellefteå AIK	16	1	9	10	+1	10
(Canada) Dylan Sikura	Skellefteå AIK	13	4	5	9	0	4
(Sweden) Andreas Johnsson	Skellefteå AIK	11	5	3	8	+3	29
(Sweden) Linus Lindström	Skellefteå AIK	16	5	3	8	+1	14

==== Leading goaltenders ====
The following shows the top goaltenders who led the league in goals against average, provided that they have played at least 40% of their team's minutes, at the conclusion of the playoffs.

Player	Team	GP	TOI	W	L	GA	SO	Sv%	GAA
(Sweden) Christoffer Rifalk	Rögle BK	15	992:17	11	4	22	2	95.45	1.33
(Sweden) Linus Söderström	Skellefteå AIK	14	949:58	11	3	24	3	94.39	1.52
(Norway) Jonas Arntzen	Örebro HK	3	190:51	1	2	5	0	94.95	1.57
(Sweden) Joel Lassinantti	Luleå HF	5	304:48	2	3	9	2	90.62	1.77
(Sweden) Filip Larsson	Leksands IF	5	313:35	3	2	10	1	92.91	1.91

== Play Out ==
The two bottom-placed teams from the regular season (HV71 and IK Oskarshamn) played a best-of-seven series, with the winner remaining in the SHL and the loser relegated to the second tier, the HockeyAllsvenskan. The higher-seeded team held home advantage over the series, playing at home for the first two games and games five and seven while the lower-seeded team was at home for games three, four and six .

15 March	HV71	2–4	IK Oskarshamn	Husqvarna Garden	Recap
No scoring		First period	5:01 – Viktor Lodin (1); 11:34 – Ahti Oksanen (1; PPG)
No scoring		Second period	8:41 – Austin Wagner (1)
Tommi Tikka (1; PPG/EA) – 14:30; Måns Lindbäck (1; EA) – 18:01		Third period	11:48 – Viktor Lodin (2; PPG)
Joni Ortio (23 shots / 19 saves)		Goalie stats	Marek Langhamer (33 shots / 31 saves)

17 March	HV71	4–0	IK Oskarshamn	Husqvarna Garden	Recap
No scoring		First period	No scoring
Henrik Borgström (1) – 7:23		Second period	No scoring
Oskar Stål-Lyrenäs (1) – 2:50; André Petersson (1) – 10:56; Victor Sjöholm (1; ENG) – 19:30		Third period	No scoring
Frederik Dichow (28 shots / 28 saves)		Goalie stats	Marek Langhamer (33 shots / 30 saves)

20 March	IK Oskarshamn	2–3	OT	HV71	Be-Ge Hockey Center	Recap
No scoring		First period		No scoring
Hynek Zohorna (1) – 5:42		Second period		15:54 – Oliwer Kaski (1)
Austin Wagner (2) – 9:32		Third period		16:38 – Isac Brännström (1)
No scoring		First overtime period		4:50 – Oskar Stål-Lyrenäs (2)
Tomas Rydén (28 shots / 25 saves)		Goalie stats		Frederik Dichow (30 shots / 28 saves); Joni Ortio (0 shots / 0 saves)

22 March	IK Oskarshamn	4–2	HV71	Be-Ge Hockey Center	Recap
Austin Wagner (3) – 5:07		First period	3:56 – Radan Lenc (1); 12:55 – Henrik Borgström (2)
Austin Wagner (4; PPG) – 8:14; Viktor Lodin (3; PPG) – 14:34		Second period	No scoring
Viktor Lodin (4; ENG) – 18:52		Third period	No scoring
Tomas Rydén (34 shots / 32 saves)		Goalie stats	Frederik Dichow (27 shots / 24 saves)

24 March	HV71	2–1	IK Oskarshamn	Husqvarna Garden	Recap
No scoring		First period	12:13 – Lukáš Jašek (1)
Oliwer Kaski (2; PPG) – 11:54		Second period	No scoring
Radan Lenc (2; SHG) – 6:10		Third period	No scoring
Frederik Dichow (22 shots / 21 saves)		Goalie stats	Tomas Rydén (24 shots / 22 saves)

26 March	IK Oskarshamn	4–2	HV71	Be-Ge Hockey Center	Recap
David Quenneville (1; PPG) – 9:45; Hampus Karlsson (1) – 17:37		First period	10:53 – Hugo Fransson (1)
Nick Olesen (1) – 13:33		Second period	No scoring
Viktor Lodin (5; ENG) – 18:57		Third period	2:51 – André Petersson (2)
Tomas Rydén (34 shots / 32 saves)		Goalie stats	Frederik Dichow (31 shots / 28 saves)

29 March	HV71	5–0	IK Oskarshamn	Husqvarna Garden	Recap
No scoring		First period	No scoring
Åke Stakkestad (1) – 2:58; Oliwer Kaski (3; PPG) – 8:07; Åke Stakkestad (2) – 12:37		Second period	No scoring
Nick Shore (1) – 12:07; Oliwer Kaski (4; ENG) – 13:48		Third period	No scoring
Frederik Dichow (20 shots / 20 saves)		Goalie stats	Tomas Rydén (32 shots / 28 saves)

HV71 win series 4–3

== SHL awards ==
Award	Winner(s)
Guldhjälmen	Joel Persson (Växjö Lakers)
Guldpucken	
Honken Trophy	Lars Johansson (Frölunda HC)
Håkan Loob Trophy	David Tomášek (Färjestad BK)
Rookie of the Year	Jonathan Lekkerimäki (Örebro HK)
Salming Trophy	Axel Sandin Pellikka (Skellefteå AIK)
Stefan Liv Memorial Trophy	Linus Söderström (Skellefteå AIK)
Guldpipan	Linus Öhlund
