= Viktor Lodin =

Swedish ice hockey player (born 1999)

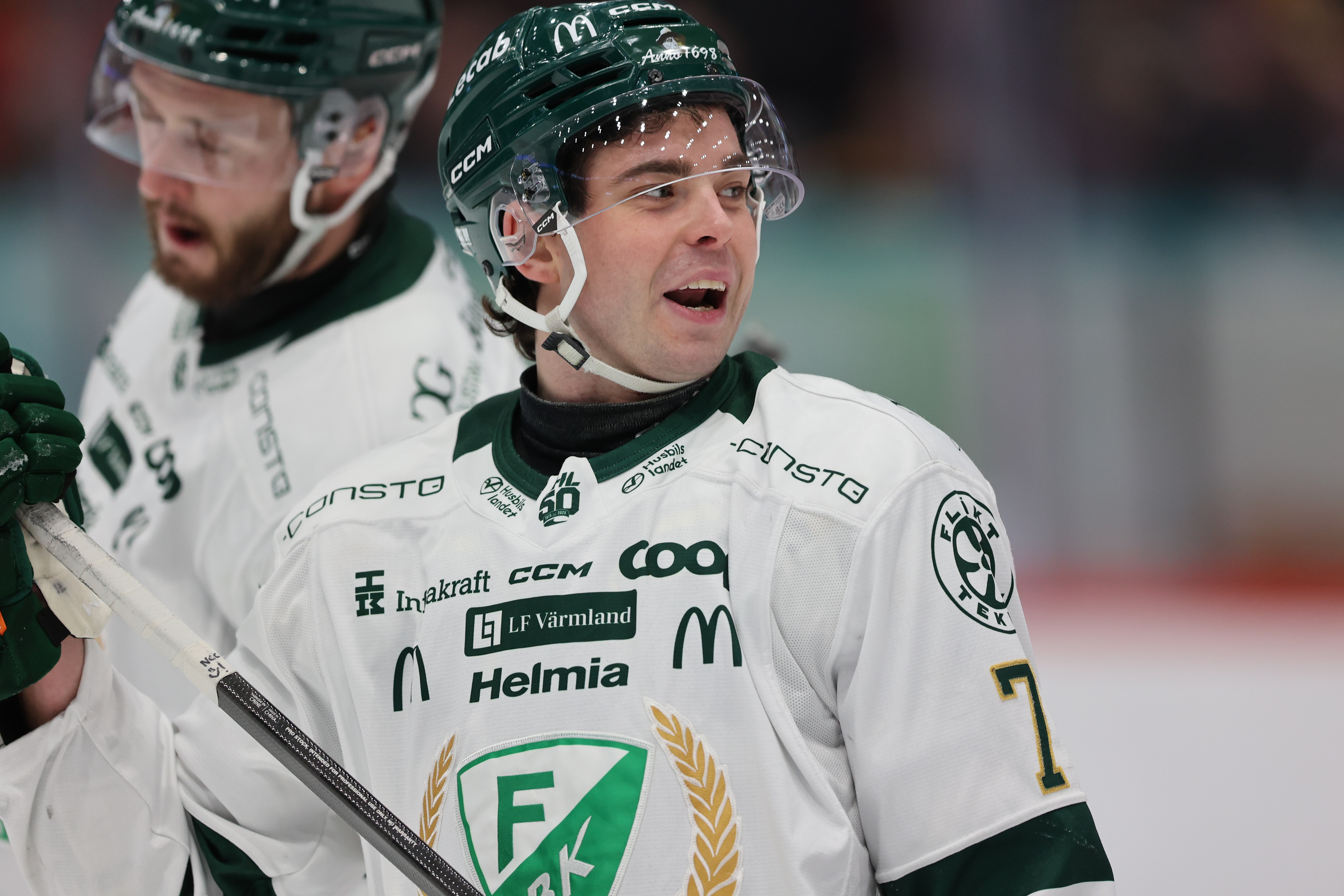
- Born: 2 June 1999 (age 27) Leksand, Sweden
- Height: 6 ft 2 in (188 cm)
- Weight: 185 lb (84 kg; 13 st 3 lb)
- Position: Centre
- Shoots: Left
- SHL team Former teams: Färjestad BK; Örebro HK; Timrå IK; Ottawa Senators; IK Oskarshamn
- NHL draft: 94th overall, 2019; Ottawa Senators
- Playing career: 2018–present

Viktor Lodin (born 2 June 1999) is a Swedish professional ice hockey centre who is currently playing for Färjestad BK in the Swedish Hockey League (SHL). He developed in Örebro HK's system before joining Timrå IK. He was selected by the Ottawa Senators of the National Hockey League (NHL) in the fourth round, 94th overall, in the 2019 NHL entry draft. He appeared for the team in the 2021–22 NHL season before returning to Sweden with IK Oskarshamn in 2023.

== Early life ==
Lodin was born in Leksand, Sweden on 2 June 1999. His father is Hans Lodin. Raised in Leksand, he tried out for Leksands IF but did not succeed in joining their team. He was also rejected by Västerås IK. He then tried out for Örebro HK, who offered him a spot.

== Playing career ==
=== Sweden ===
Lodin played his youth hockey in Örebro HK's system, working his way through their J20 SuperElit team to earn a contract with the senior team on 17 April 2018. He made his Swedish Hockey League (SHL) debut with Örebro HK the 2018–19 season, playing in 41 games, scoring one goal and four assists for five points. Örebro HK qualified for the playoffs and faced Växjö Lakers in the opening round best-of-three series. Växjö swept Örebro in the series, with Lodin playing in both games, going scoreless. In the following 2019–20 season, he began with Örebro HK, playing in 22 games, registering four assists. He was loaned to HC Vita Hästen of the second-tier HockeyAllsvenskan on 15 November 2019 and spent the remainder of the season until it was cancelled on 15 March 2020 due to the COVID-19 pandemic. In 18 games with Vita Hästen, he tallied three goals and eight points.

Out of contract from Örebro HK leading into the 2020–21 season, Lodin was signed to a one-year contract by Timrå IK of the HockeyAllsvenskan on 27 July 2020. During his time with Örebro HK, Lodin struggled with mental health and in September 2020, Lodin was arrested for drug offences. He later apologized for his mistake. In 47 games with Timrå IK, he recorded 14 goals and 40 points, helping the team to the top spot in the league. In the playoffs Timrå IK advanced to the final where they beat IF Björklöven to secure promotion to the SHL. In 13 playoff games, he scored four goals and nine points.

=== North America ===
Lodin was selected in the fourth round, 94th overall, by the Ottawa Senators of the National Hockey League (NHL) in the 2019 NHL entry draft. On 1 June 2021, Lodin was signed to a two-year, entry-level contract by the Senators beginning in the 2021–22 season. On 9 July 2021, Lodin was loaned by the Senators to continue his development with Timrå IK in their return to the SHL for the duration of the season. He was suspended for five games on 10 October after making an illegal hit to the head of Leksand's Jonas Ahnelöv. In 44 games with Timrå IK, he marked 12 goals and 27 points. After helping Timrå IK avoid relegation back to the HockeyAllsvenskan, Lodin joined Ottawa's American Hockey League (AHL) affiliate, the Belleville Senators, towards the end of their season. In the first nine games after arriving in Belleville, he scored five goals and seven points, helping Belleville make the 2021 Calder Cup playoffs. He was recalled from Belleville on 29 April 2022 and played in his first NHL game in the Senators 4–2 victory over the Philadelphia Flyers that night. He was returned to Belleville the next day.

In a 2022 preseason game against the Montreal Canadiens, Lodin was hit high by Montreal defenceman Arber Xhekaj which resulted in a concussion. He was assigned to Belleville for the 2022–23 season and made 28 appearances, scoring six goals and 15 points. As a pending restricted free agent from the Senators, he was not tendered a qualifying offer by the team and became an unrestricted free agent.

=== Return to Sweden ===
Lodin opted to return to Sweden to secure a two-year contract with IK Oskarshamn of the SHL on 6 May 2023. In 40 games, he scored 11 goals and 31 points. In the relegation series, Oskarshamn faced HV71. Lodin marked five goals and ten points in the seven-game series that Oskarshamn lost while playing injured. He received death threats from people hoping to see HV71 remain in the SHL.

After Oskarshamn was relegated to HockeyAllsvenskan at the end of the 2023–24 season, Lodin opted to sign with Färjestad BK to remain in the SHL. In his first season with the team in 2024–25, he scored 17 goals and 44 points in 50 games. Färjestad lost to Skellefteå AIK in the playoff quarterfinals in six games, with Lodin adding one assist in the series. He was suspended in the series for two games after hitting Skellefteå foward Arvid Lundberg in the face with his stick. In his second season with Färjestad in 2025–26, he registered 12 goals and 46 points in 49 games. They faced Rögle BK in the quarterfinals where they were eliminated in seven games. Lodin missed game five of the series after he was suspended for the match for slewfooting Calle Själin. In five playoff games, he scored twice and recorded five points.

== Career statistics ==
			Regular season					Playoffs
Season	Team	League	GP	G	A	Pts	PIM	GP	G	A	Pts	PIM
2016–17	Örebro HK	J20	5	0	1	1	4	—	—	—	—	—
2017–18	Örebro HK	J20	44	13	20	33	60	6	3	6	9	10
2018–19	Örebro HK	J20	18	7	11	18	72	4	4	4	8	4
2018–19	Örebro HK	SHL	41	1	4	5	14	2	0	0	0	2
2019–20	Örebro HK	SHL	22	0	4	4	2	—	—	—	—	—
2019–20	HC Vita Hästen	Allsv	18	3	5	8	4	1	0	0	0	2
2020–21	Timrå IK	Allsv	47	14	26	40	20	13	4	5	9	8
2021–22	Timrå IK	SHL	44	12	15	27	45	—	—	—	—	—
2021–22	Belleville Senators	AHL	10	5	3	8	2	—	—	—	—	—
2021–22	Ottawa Senators	NHL	1	0	0	0	0	—	—	—	—	—
2022–23	Belleville Senators	AHL	28	6	9	15	34	—	—	—	—	—
2023–24	IK Oskarshamn	SHL	40	11	20	31	32	—	—	—	—	—
2024–25	Färjestad BK	SHL	50	17	27	44	61	4	0	1	1	31
2025–26	Färjestad BK	SHL	49	12	34	46	44	5	2	3	5	8
SHL totals			197	41	70	111	154	6	0	1	1	33
NHL totals			1	0	0	0	0	—	—	—	—	—
