= Andreas Johnsson =

Swedish ice hockey player (born 1994)

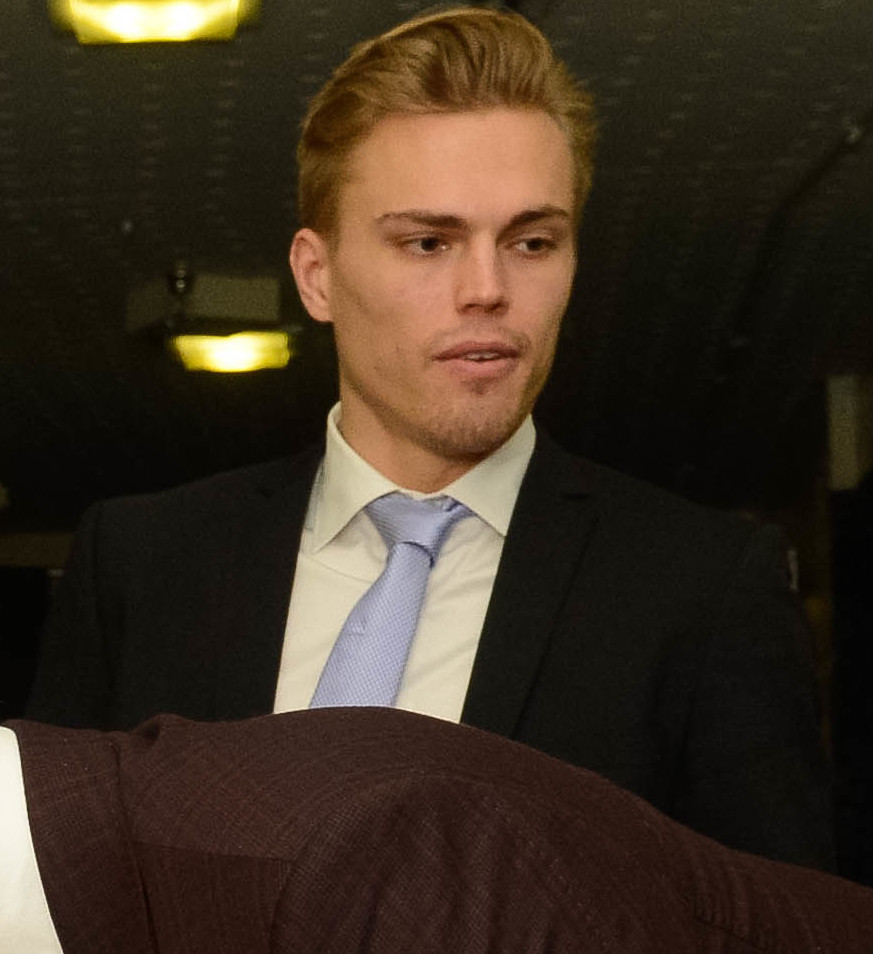
- Johnsson in 2018
- Born: 21 November 1994 (age 31) Gävle, Sweden
- Height: 178 cm (5 ft 10 in)
- Weight: 82 kg (181 lb; 12 st 13 lb)
- Position: Winger
- Shoots: Left
- SHL team Former teams: Skellefteå AIK; Frölunda HC; Toronto Maple Leafs; New Jersey Devils; San Jose Sharks
- NHL draft: 202nd overall, 2013; Toronto Maple Leafs
- Playing career: 2012–present

Andreas Karl Johnsson (born 21 November 1994) is a Swedish professional ice hockey winger for Skellefteå AIK of the Swedish Hockey League (SHL). Johnsson played with the Toronto Maple Leafs, New Jersey Devils, San Jose Sharks, and Pittsburgh Penguins in the National Hockey League (NHL). He was selected by the Toronto Maple Leafs in the seventh round, 202nd overall, of the 2013 NHL entry draft.

Johansson won the SHL's Le Mat Trophy championship with Frölunda in 2016 and Skellefteå AIK in 2024 and 2026. He was also a 2018 Calder Cup champion with the Toronto Marlies.

== Early life ==
Johnsson was born on 21 November 1994 in Gävle, Sweden. He is the youngest son of former ice hockey player Jonas Johnson. Andreas' older brother Jonathan is also an ice hockey player, who plays for Skellefteå AIK.

== Playing career ==
=== Sweden ===
Johnsson made his Elitserien debut for Frölunda HC on 18 December 2012 in a home game against AIK IF. In his second game, on 26 December at Rögle BK, Johnsson scored his first career Elitserien goal, the game-winning goal in the shootout.

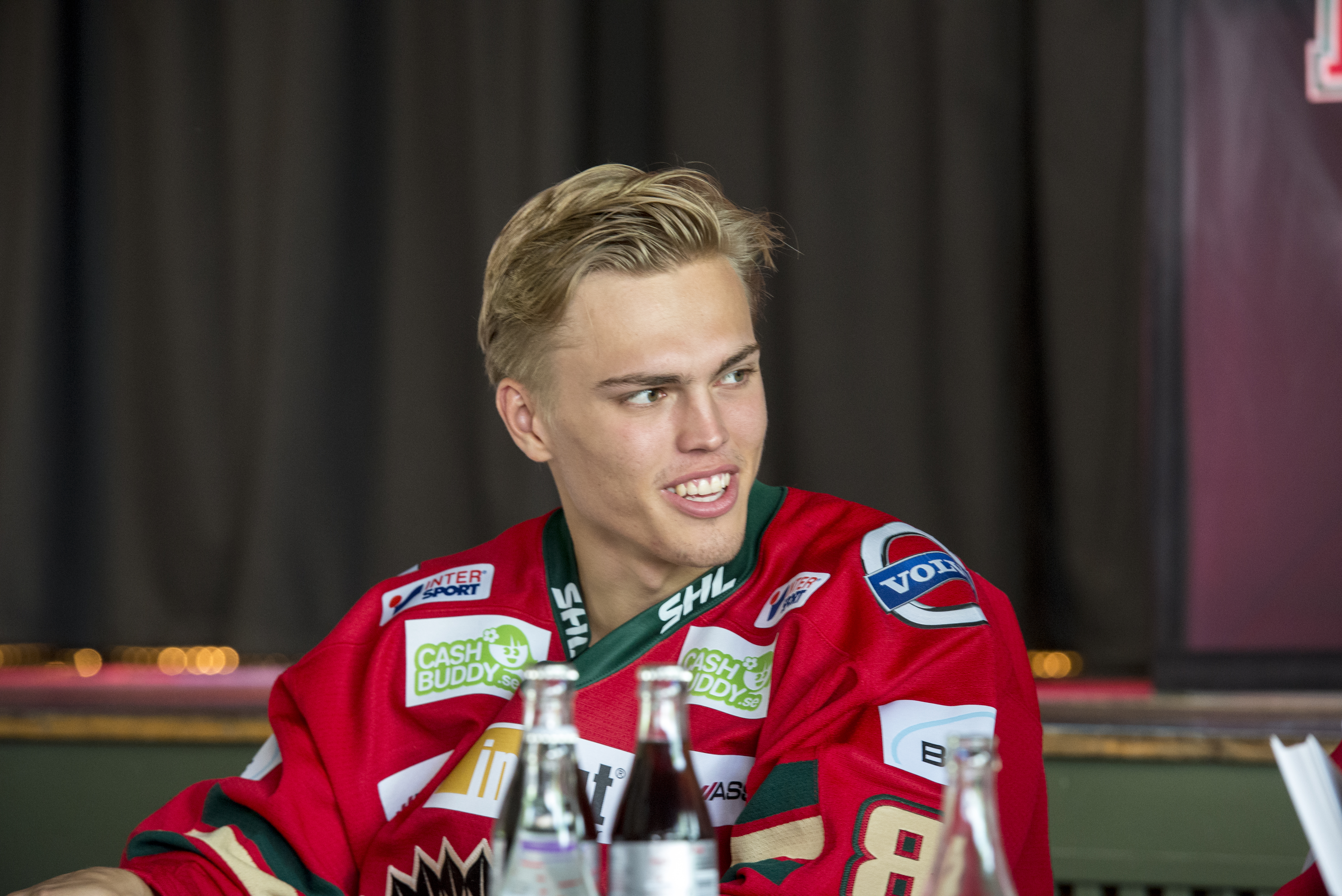
Johnsson made his Elitserien debut with Frölunda HC in December 2012

On 21 April 2014, Johnsson was named the SHL Rookie of the Year, beating out Frölunda teammates Alexander Wennberg and fellow Maple Leafs prospect Tom Nilsson, as well as HV71's Kevin Fiala.

During the 2014–15 season, Johnsson led Frölunda in goals with 22, also contributing 13 assists for 35 points from 55 regular season games played. On 4 June 2015, the Maple Leafs signed Johnsson to a three-year, entry-level contract.

=== NHL ===
==== Toronto Maple Leafs ====
The following season was another sensational year for Johnsson, in which he finished sixth in league scoring and helped Frölunda capture their fourth championship. Having stated this would be his last season in Sweden and wanting to begin his North American development, Johnsson debuted for the Toronto Marlies—the Maple Leafs' American Hockey League (AHL) affiliate—shortly afterwards in order to assist their Calder Cup playoff run. However, his stint was cut short, as in his second North American game, Johnsson was hit in the head by an elbow from Albany Devils player Dan Kelly. Kelly was suspended ten games for the play and Johnsson would not play another game that season.

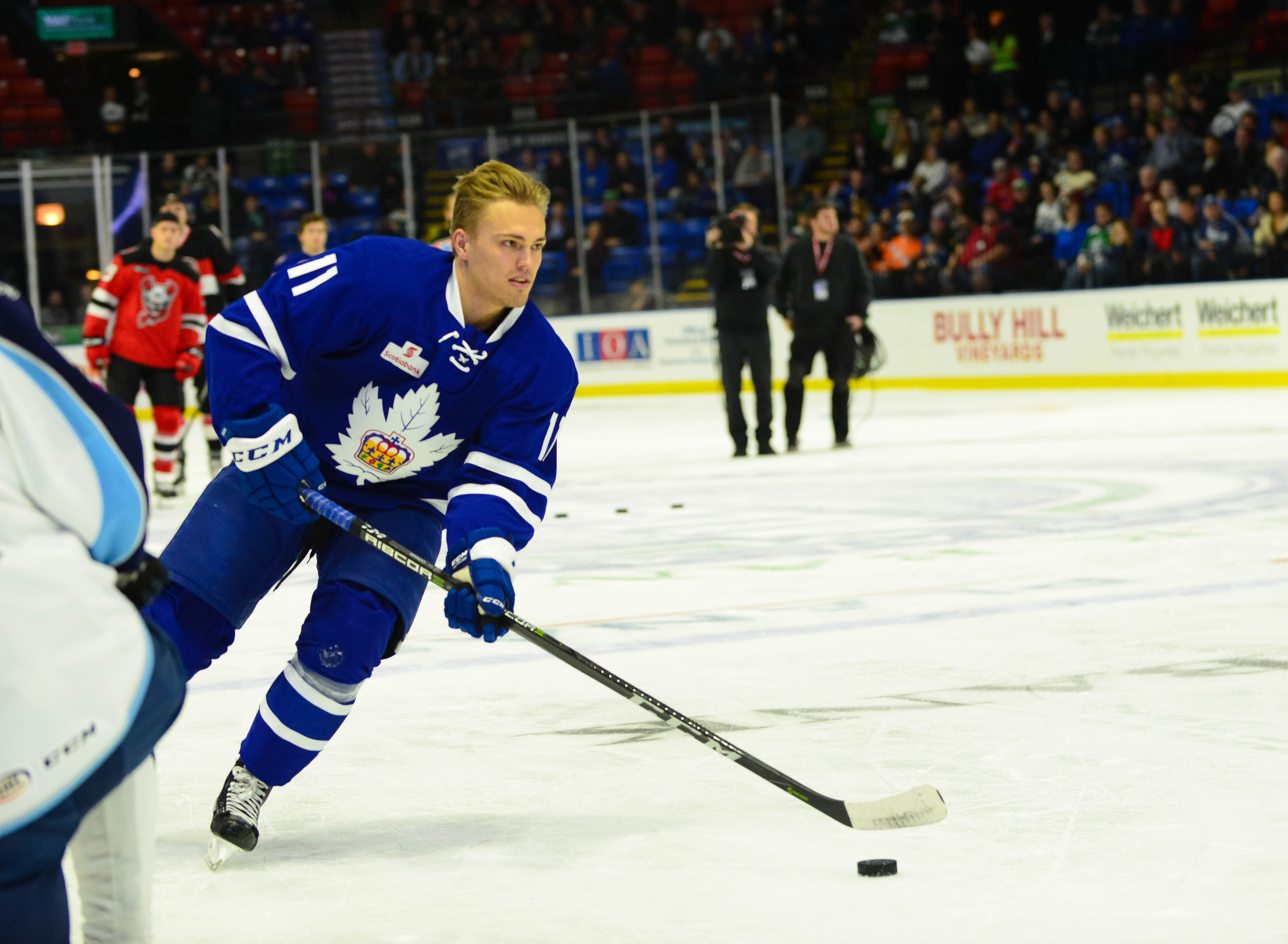
Johnsson with the Toronto Marlies, participating in the 2018 AHL All-Star Game

During the 2017–18 season, Johnsson was named to the 2018 AHL All-Star Game as a replacement for fellow Maple Leafs prospect Kasperi Kapanen, who was called up to the NHL. On 13 March 2018, Johnsson was called up to the Maple Leafs alongside Calle Rosén. While Rosén was sent back down, Johnsson made his NHL debut on 14 March in a 6–5 win over the Dallas Stars. He recorded his first NHL goal in the following game against the Montreal Canadiens, a 4–0 victory. Johnsson recorded his first multi-point game on 2 April 2018 in a 5–2 win over the Buffalo Sabres. Near the conclusion of the 2017–18 regular season, Johnsson was selected for the AHL's Second All-Star team. Johnsson made his NHL playoff debut during the 2018 Stanley Cup playoffs against the Boston Bruins and recorded his first playoff goal on 21 April to help the Leafs win 4–3. After the Leafs were eliminated from the playoffs, Johnsson was sent down to the Marlies to help them in their 2018 Calder Cup playoff run. After leading all players in points during the playoffs, Johnsson was awarded the Jack Butterfield Trophy as MVP of the Calder Cup. As a restricted free agent entering the off-season, Johnsson accepted his qualifying offer from the Maple Leafs, signing a one-year, two-way contract worth $787,500.

Following a successful training camp, Johnsson began the 2018–19 season with the Maple Leafs in the NHL. On 24 November, in a game against the Philadelphia Flyers, Johnsson scored his first career NHL hat-trick by scoring three goals in the first period to lead the Leafs to a 6–0 win.

On 28 June 2019, after scoring 20 goals and 43 points, Johnsson signed a new four-year, $13.6 million contract with the Maple Leafs worth an average annual value of $3.4 million. In the 2019–20 season, Johnsson scored eight goals and 21 points in 65 games with the Maple Leafs. His season came to an end after suffering a knee injury in a collision with teammate Kasperi Kapanen. On 19 February 2020, it was announced he would miss the rest of the season.

==== New Jersey Devils ====
On 10 October 2020, Johnsson was traded by the Maple Leafs to the New Jersey Devils in exchange for Joey Anderson. After playing 121 games in two seasons with the Devils, Johnsson was put on waivers but went unclaimed before the 2022–23 season started and was sent to play for AHL affiliate, the Utica Comets. Johnsson later returned on recall to the NHL, featuring in two scoreless games with the Devils, before he was returned to the Comets. Through 36 games with the Comets, Johnsson was second in team scoring with nine goals and 29 points.

==== San Jose Sharks ====
On 26 February 2023, Johnsson was included in a multi-player trade to the San Jose Sharks in exchange for Timo Meier. He skated in 11 games for the Sharks, recording three assists.

==== Pittsburgh Penguins ====
On 7 July 2023, Johnsson signed as a free agent to a one-year, $800,000 contract with the Pittsburgh Penguins. After the preseason, Johnsson was assigned to the Penguins' AHL affiliate, the Wilkes-Barre/Scranton Penguins; however, after not playing for the first month of the season, Johnsson was placed on waivers for the purpose of contract termination on 8 November 2023.

==== Return to Sweden ====
Signalling the end of his tenure in North America, Johnsson immediately returned to his native Sweden and rejoined the SHL by agreeing to a four-year contract with Skellefteå AIK on 10 November 2023. In joining the club he was reunited with his brother Jonathan.

== Career statistics ==
=== Regular season and playoffs ===
			Regular season					Playoffs
Season	Team	League	GP	G	A	Pts	PIM	GP	G	A	Pts	PIM
2010–11	Frölunda HC	J18	12	9	9	18	8	—	—	—	—	—
2010–11	Frölunda HC	J18 Allsv	15	14	13	27	18	5	3	1	4	2
2010–11	Frölunda HC	J20	30	9	5	14	4	3	0	1	1	0
2011–12	Frölunda HC	J18	3	3	5	8	2	—	—	—	—	—
2011–12	Frölunda HC	J18 Allsv	3	6	0	6	2	4	2	4	6	4
2011–12	Frölunda HC	J20	42	19	13	32	75	2	0	0	0	0
2012–13	Frölunda HC	J20	42	23	31	54	54	4	1	1	2	12
2012–13	Frölunda HC	SEL	7	1	0	1	0	5	0	0	0	0
2013–14	Frölunda HC	J20	4	1	4	5	0	—	—	—	—	—
2013–14	Frölunda HC	SHL	44	15	9	24	2	7	1	0	1	4
2014–15	Frölunda HC	SHL	55	22	13	35	34	8	2	2	4	4
2015–16	Frölunda HC	SHL	52	19	25	44	20	16	2	2	4	8
2015–16	Toronto Marlies	AHL	—	—	—	—	—	2	0	0	0	0
2016–17	Toronto Marlies	AHL	75	20	27	47	42	11	6	0	6	13
2017–18	Toronto Marlies	AHL	54	26	28	54	53	16	10	14	24	4
2017–18	Toronto Maple Leafs	NHL	9	2	1	3	0	6	1	1	2	2
2018–19	Toronto Maple Leafs	NHL	73	20	23	43	32	7	1	3	4	0
2019–20	Toronto Maple Leafs	NHL	43	8	13	21	14	1	0	0	0	0
2020–21	New Jersey Devils	NHL	50	5	6	11	12	—	—	—	—	—
2021–22	New Jersey Devils	NHL	71	13	22	35	30	—	—	—	—	—
2022–23	Utica Comets	AHL	36	9	20	29	42	—	—	—	—	—
2022–23	New Jersey Devils	NHL	2	0	0	0	0	—	—	—	—	—
2022–23	San Jose Sharks	NHL	11	0	3	3	6	—	—	—	—	—
2023–24	Skellefteå AIK	SHL	30	6	10	16	12	11	5	3	8	29
2024–25	Skellefteå AIK	SHL	47	7	10	17	28	9	3	1	4	8
2025–26	Skellefteå AIK	SHL	52	13	12	25	32	15	3	8	11	4
SHL totals			287	83	79	162	128	71	16	16	32	57
NHL totals			259	48	68	116	94	14	2	4	6	2

=== International ===
Year	Team	Event	Result	GP	G	A	Pts	PIM
2014	Sweden	WJC	2nd place, silver medalist(s)	7	3	3	6	6
Junior totals				7	3	3	6	6

== Awards and honors ==
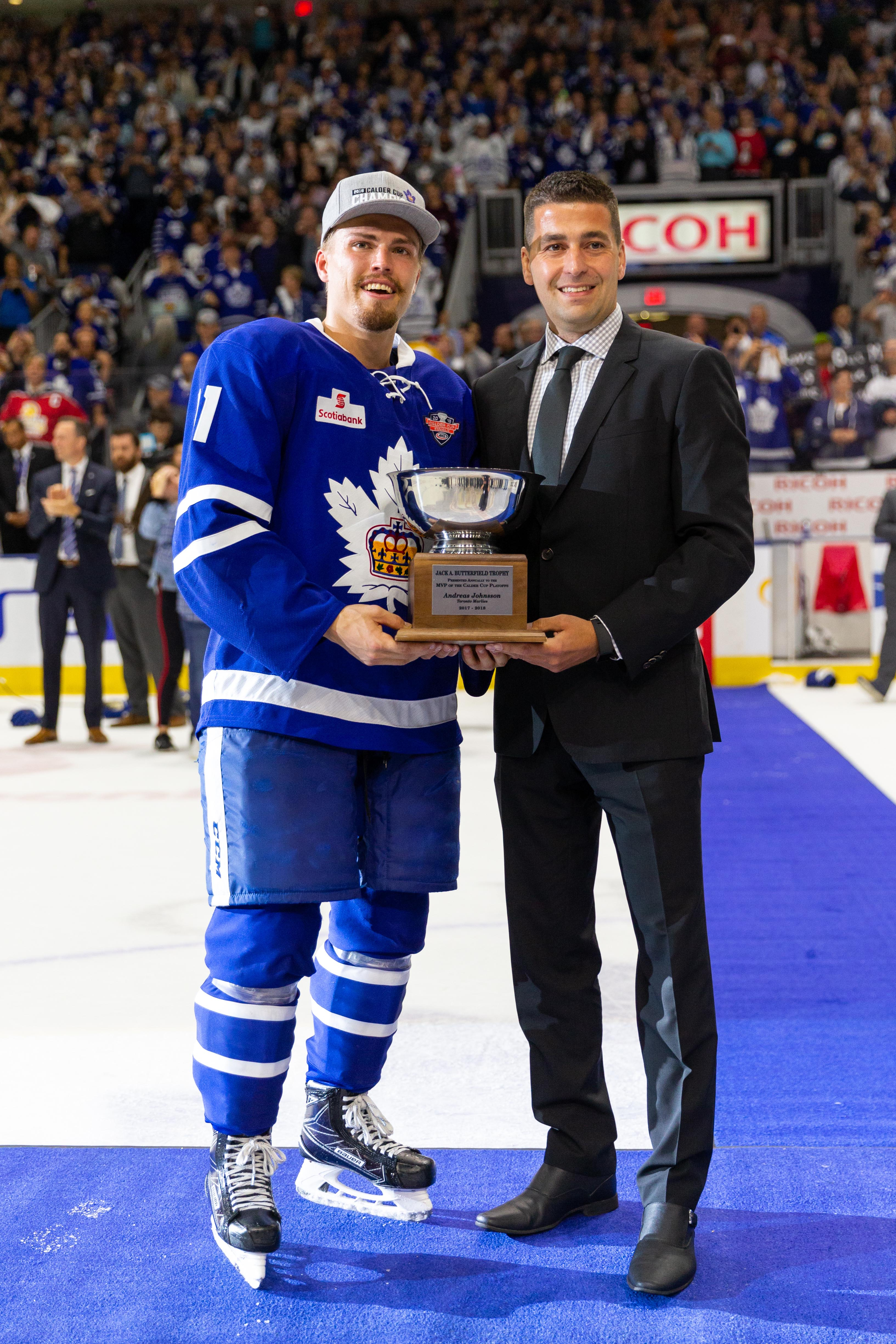
Johnsson with the AHL's Jack Butterfield Award as playoff MVP in 2018.

Award	Year
SHL
Rookie of the Year	2014
Le Mat Trophy champion	2016, 2024
CHL
Champions	2016
AHL
All-Star Game	2018
Second All-Star Team	2018
Jack A. Butterfield Trophy	2018
Calder Cup champion	2018

Awards and achievements
Preceded by William Karlsson	Winner of the SHL Rookie of the Year award 2014	Succeeded by Marcus Sörensen
