= Norgren =

Norgren is a surname. Notable people with the surname include:

- Britta Norgren (born 1983), Swedish cross country skier
- Christoffer Norgren (born 1974), Swedish ice hockey player
- Daniel Norgren (born 1983), Swedish singer-songwriter
- Leif Norgren (born 1964), Swedish former ice sledge hockey player
- Klas Norgren, Swedish sprint canoeist
- Nelson Norgren (1891–1974), American football and basketball player and coach.
- Pontus Norgren, Swedish guitarist
- Thomas Norgren (born 1961), Swedish curler and curling coach
