= Martin Karlsson (ice hockey, born 1952) =

Swedish ice hockey player and coach

- Born: April 26, 1952 (age 73); Skellefteå, Sweden
- Height: 5 ft 10 in (178 cm)
- Weight: 163 lb (74 kg; 11 st 9 lb)
- Position: Centre
- Shot: Left
- Played for: Skellefteå AIK; Brynäs IF
- National team: Sweden
- Playing career: 1969–1983

Martin Karlsson (born April 26, 1952) is a retired Swedish ice hockey centre and currently the head coach of AaB Ishockey. As a player, he won the Swedish National Championship for three consecutive seasons, with Brynäs IF in 1976 and 1977 and with Skellefteå AIK in 1978. Karlsson was also the Elitserien scoring leader in the 1977–78 season. He has coached AaB Ishockey, Nordsjælland Cobras, EC Red Bull Salzburg, and IF Troja/Ljungby. He coached IF Troja/Ljungby from 2007 to 2011 before returning to AaB Ishockey in the 2011–12 season as the team's head coach.

== Career statistics ==
			Regular season					Playoffs
Season	Team	League	GP	G	A	Pts	PIM	GP	G	A	Pts	PIM
1975–76	Brynäs IF	SEL	36	24	12	36	16	4	3	2	5	2
1976–77	Brynäs IF	SEL	36	37	15	52	14	4	3	4	7	0
1977–78	Skellefteå AIK	SEL	36	33	30	63	18	5	2	1	3	0
1978–79	Skellefteå	SEL	35	16	9	25	12	—	—	—	—	—
SEL totals			143	110	66	176	60	13	8	7	13	2

== International resume ==
- World Championships silver: 1977
- World Championships bronze: 1976
