= Martin Pettersson =

Swedish ice hockey player

- Born: January 19, 1961 (age 64); Sweden
- Height: 5 ft 9 in (175 cm)
- Weight: 163 lb (74 kg; 11 st 9 lb)
- Position: Forward
- Shot: Left
- SEL team: Skellefteå AIK
- Playing career: 1979–1991

Medal record

Representing Sweden

Ice hockey

World Junior Championships
Gold medal – first place	1981 West Germany	

Martin Pettersson (born January 19, 1961), is a retired ice hockey player who spent 12 seasons with Skellefteå AIK. Pettersson won a WJC gold medal in 1981.
