= Lukas Vejdemo =

Swedish ice hockey player (born 1996)

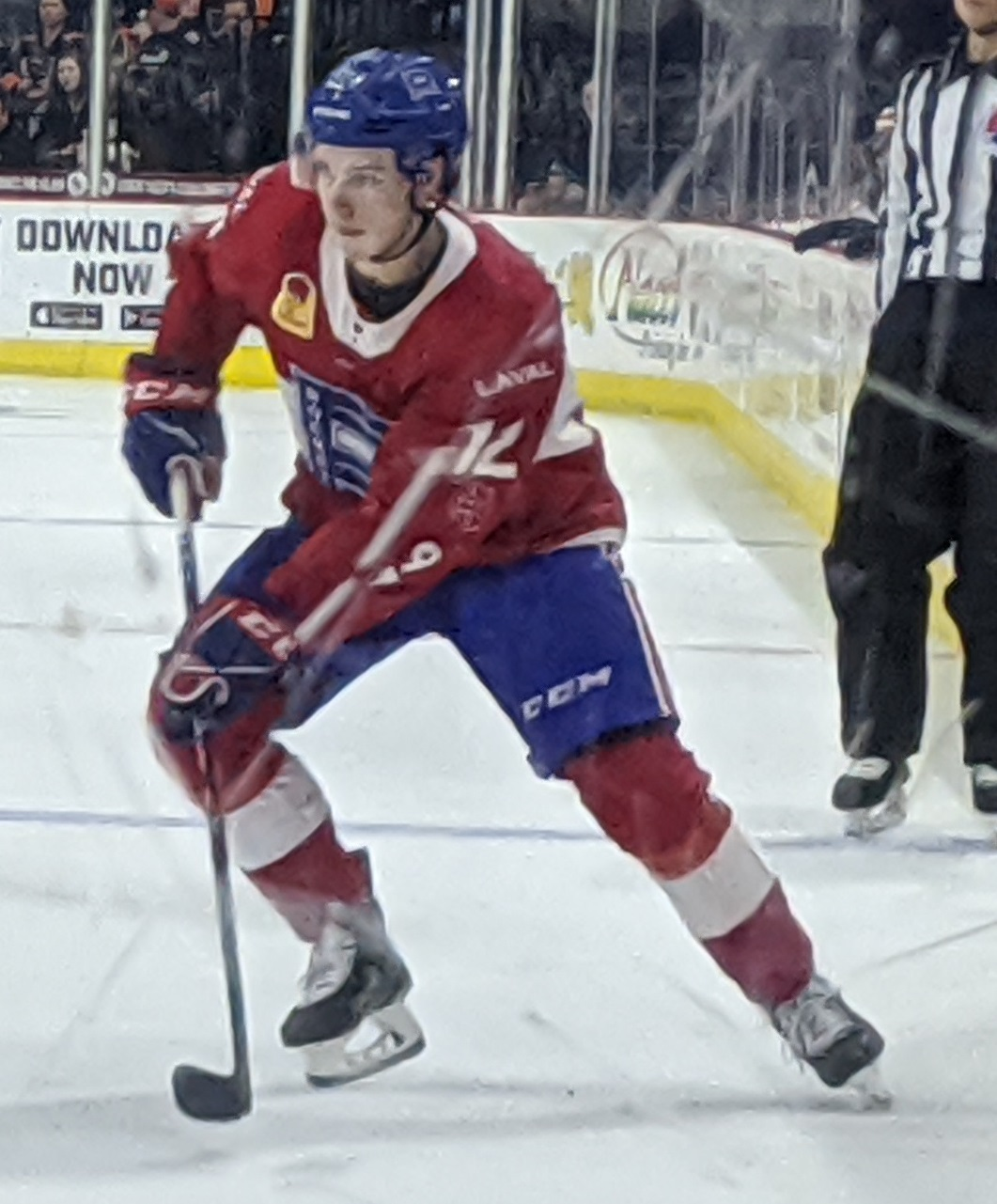
- Vejdemo with the Laval Rocket in 2020
- Born: 25 January 1996 (age 30) Stockholm, Sweden
- Height: 6 ft 2 in (188 cm)
- Weight: 194 lb (88 kg; 13 st 12 lb)
- Position: Centre
- Shoots: Left
- SHL team Former teams: Leksands IF; Djurgårdens IF; Montreal Canadiens
- NHL draft: 87th overall, 2015; Montreal Canadiens
- Playing career: 2014–present

Lukas Vejdemo (born 25 January 1996) is a Swedish professional ice hockey player who is a centre for Leksands IF of the Swedish Hockey League (SHL). He was selected in the third round, 87th overall, by the Montreal Canadiens in the 2015 NHL entry draft.

== Playing career ==
Vejdemo made his Swedish Hockey League (SHL) debut playing with Djurgårdens IF during the 2014–15 SHL season. Following the campaign, the Montreal Canadiens of the National Hockey League (NHL) selected Vejdemo in the third round, 87th overall, during the 2015 NHL entry draft.

In the 2017–18 season, Vejdemo established career highs of 10 goals and 22 assists in 47 games. On 2 May 2018, the Canadiens signed him to a two-year, entry-level contract. Vejdemo spent the 2018-19 season with the Canadiens' American Hockey League (AHL) affiliate, the Laval Rocket. In 66 games, he recorded 13 goals and 16 assists for 29 points.

On 31 December 2019, Vejdemo made his NHL debut in a 3–1 loss to the Carolina Hurricanes. On 10 March 2020, he scored his first career NHL goal in a 4–2 loss to the Nashville Predators. Vejdemo finished the season with seven appearances for the Canadiens, as well as 47 for the Rocket. On 4 September 2020, the Canadiens re-signed Vejdemo to a one-year, two-way contract extension. Two days later, the team loaned him to Södertälje SK of HockeyAllsvenskan, with the expectation he would return to North America to attend the Canadiens' and Rocket's training camps for the 2020–21 season.

Following the 2021–22 season, after three seasons within the Canadiens organization, Vejdemo left as an unrestricted free agent. Having suffered a serious injury during the AHL playoff run with the Rocket, Vejdemo underwent surgery, going unsigned into the 2022–23 season. In recovering from injury, Vejdemo belatedly signed an optional two-year contract in a return to hometown club, Djurgårdens IF, playing in HockeyAllsvenskan on 8 February 2023. He got into four games with Djurgårdens IF during the regular season and 15 games in the playoffs as the team was knocked out by MoDo in the final.

On 3 June 2023, Vejdemo agreed to a four-year contract with Leksands IF of the SHL, beginning in the 2023–24 season.

== Career statistics ==
			Regular season					Playoffs
Season	Team	League	GP	G	A	Pts	PIM	GP	G	A	Pts	PIM
2012–13	Djurgårdens IF	J20	5	0	0	0	0	1	0	0	0	0
2013–14	Djurgårdens IF	J20	3	1	0	1	2	1	0	0	0	0
2014–15	Djurgårdens IF	J20	34	23	25	48	51	7	4	2	6	4
2014–15	Djurgårdens IF	SHL	3	0	0	0	0	—	—	—	—	—
2015–16	Djurgårdens IF	SHL	52	5	12	17	12	8	1	0	1	0
2015–16	Djurgårdens IF	J20	—	—	—	—	—	2	0	1	1	2
2016–17	Djurgårdens IF	SHL	48	4	4	8	8	3	0	1	1	2
2017–18	Djurgårdens IF	SHL	47	10	12	22	16	7	0	1	1	2
2018–19	Laval Rocket	AHL	66	13	16	29	18	—	—	—	—	—
2019–20	Laval Rocket	AHL	47	9	10	19	20	—	—	—	—	—
2019–20	Montreal Canadiens	NHL	7	1	0	1	0	—	—	—	—	—
2020–21	Södertälje SK	Allsv	16	2	8	10	8	—	—	—	—	—
2020–21	Laval Rocket	AHL	27	7	6	13	20	—	—	—	—	—
2021–22	Laval Rocket	AHL	34	6	10	16	12	—	—	—	—	—
2021–22	Montreal Canadiens	NHL	6	1	0	1	0	—	—	—	—	—
2022–23	Djurgårdens IF	Allsv	4	2	1	3	4	15	5	4	9	35
2023–24	Leksands IF	SHL	40	10	13	23	39	7	2	2	4	2
2024–25	Leksands IF	SHL	48	7	9	16	18	—	—	—	—	—
SHL totals			238	36	50	86	93	25	3	4	7	6
NHL totals			13	2	0	2	0	—	—	—	—	—
