= Jonathan Johnson (ice hockey) =

Swedish ice hockey player

- Born: 11 January 1993 (age 33) Gävle, Sweden
- Height: 180 cm (5 ft 11 in)
- Weight: 77 kg (170 lb; 12 st 2 lb)
- Position: Centre
- Shoots: Left
- SHL team Former teams: Skellefteå AIK; Frölunda HC
- Playing career: 2011–present

Nils Jonathan Johnsson (born 11 January 1993), better known as Jonathan Johnson, is a Swedish professional ice hockey centre, currently playing for Skellefteå AIK in the Swedish Hockey League (SHL).

Johnsson won the SHL's Le Mat Trophy championship with Skellefteå AIK in 2024.

== Early life ==
Johnson was born on 11 January 1993, in Gävle. He is the oldest son of former ice hockey player Jonas Johnson. Jonathan's younger brother Andreas is also an ice hockey player, currently also playing for Skellefteå AIK.

== Playing career ==
Johnson started playing ice hockey with Gävle GIK at a young age, in 1998 when his father started playing for Frölunda HC Johnson joined HK Kings from Kungsbacka. During the 2007–08 season Johnson played one game for Kings' senior team in Division 3—Sweden's fifth highest league. In 2008 Johnson represented Halland in TV-pucken, collecting two assists in five games, the same year he also joined Frölunda's junior organisation for the 2008–09 season. During the 2009–10 season Johnson was the top scored in the J18 Elit South division, with 17 goals and 13 assists for a total of 30 points in 19 games, in the continuation series J18 Allsvenskan he scored nine goals and 18 points in 20 games. In the Swedish U18 Championship playoffs Johnson production dropped, scoring one goal and three points in eight games as Frölunda won a bronze medal. In 2009–10 Johnson also made his debut with the under 20 team in the J20 SuperElit. The following season he was a regular with the under 20 team, winning the 2010 European Trophy Junior tournament with Frölunda during the pre-season, and scoring six goals and 16 points in 33 games in the J20 SuperElit, while also playing sporadically with the under 18 team. In the playoffs Johnson continued suiting up for both the under 18 and under 20 team, scoring two goals and four points in four games with the under 18 team, and two goals, three points, in six games with the under 20 team, winning the Swedish Championship with both teams.

During the 2011–12 season Johnson first saw action with Frölunda's senior team, making his debut in an exhibition game against the New York Rangers, where he scored a goal on his first shot against former Frölunda keeper Henrik Lundqvist. He made his Elitserien debut on November 1 at Hovet, in a game against Djurgårdens IF. In December Johnson was loaned to Örebro HK in HockeyAllsvenskan.

== Career statistics ==
			Regular season					Playoffs
Season	Team	League	GP	G	A	Pts	PIM	GP	G	A	Pts	PIM
2009–10	Frölunda HC	J20	5	0	0	0	0	—	—	—	—	—
2010–11	Frölunda HC	J20	33	6	10	16	49	6	2	1	3	0
2011–12	Frölunda HC	J20	48	24	35	59	59	2	0	0	0	4
2011–12	Örebro HK	Allsv	1	0	0	0	0	—	—	—	—	—
2011–12	Frölunda HC	SEL	9	0	0	0	0	—	—	—	—	—
2012–13	Frölunda HC	J20	42	16	28	44	64	6	1	2	3	2
2012–13	Frölunda HC	SEL	4	0	0	0	0	—	—	—	—	—
2012–13	Kungälvs IK	Div.1	6	4	3	7	2	—	—	—	—	—
2012–13	Karlskrona HK	Allsv	1	1	0	1	0	—	—	—	—	—
2013–14	Frölunda HC	SHL	2	1	0	1	0	—	—	—	—	—
2013–14	IK Oskarshamn	Allsv	45	1	5	6	11	—	—	—	—	—
2014–15	IF Troja/Ljungby	Div.1	36	20	20	40	20	7	2	3	5	2
2015–16	Tingsryds AIF	Allsv	52	14	9	23	20	7	0	1	1	0
2016–17	Tingsryds AIF	Allsv	52	11	9	20	22	5	0	0	0	0
2017–18	IF Troja/Ljungby	Allsv	51	19	20	39	10	—	—	—	—	—
2018–19	Modo Hockey	Allsv	51	15	22	37	28	5	0	5	5	4
2019–20	Modo Hockey	Allsv	52	29	50	79	32	2	0	1	1	4
2020–21	Skellefteå AIK	SHL	48	9	15	24	8	12	1	3	4	8
2021–22	Skellefteå AIK	SHL	51	14	38	52	16	6	1	3	4	0
2022–23	Skellefteå AIK	SHL	50	10	28	38	10	15	5	3	8	4
2023–24	Skellefteå AIK	SHL	36	10	21	31	8	16	6	4	10	8
2024–25	Skellefteå AIK	SHL	48	6	22	28	20	11	3	5	8	12
SHL totals			248	50	124	174	62	60	16	18	34	32

== Awards and honours ==
Award	Year
SHL
Le Mat Trophy	2024
