= Thomas Hedin =

Ice hockey player

- Born: July 5, 1957 (age 67); Sweden
- Height: 6 ft 1 in (185 cm)
- Weight: 187 lb (85 kg; 13 st 5 lb)
- Position: Forward
- Shot: Right
- Played for: Skellefteå AIK; IF Björklöven
- Playing career: 1978–1988

Thomas Hedin (born July 5, 1957) is a retired ice hockey player who spent 8 seasons with Skellefteå AIK and two seasons with IF Björklöven. Hedin led Skellefteå AIK in scoring in four of his seasons with them.

== Career statistics ==
			Regular season					Playoffs
Season	Team	League	GP	G	A	Pts	PIM	GP	G	A	Pts	PIM
1973–74	IFK Kiruna	Division 2	1	0	0	0	—	—	—	—	—	—
1974–75	IFK Kiruna	Division 2	20	16	14	30	—	—	—	—	—	—
1975–76	IFK Kiruna	Division 1	24	17	12	29	—	—	—	—	—	—
1976–77	IFK Kiruna	Division 1	22	14	15	29	—	—	—	—	—	—
1977–78	IFK Kiruna	Division 1	24	18	10	28	20	—	—	—	—	—
1978–79	Skellefteå AIK	Elitserien	34	15	8	23	24	—	—	—	—	—
1979–80	Skellefteå AIK	Elitserien	36	19	17	36	40	—	—	—	—	—
1980–81	Skellefteå AIK	Elitserien	36	18	15	33	36	3	1	0	1	0
1981–82	Skellefteå AIK	Elitserien	29	17	6	23	24	—	—	—	—	—
1982–83	Skellefteå AIK	Elitserien	32	17	14	31	12	—	—	—	—	—
1983–84	IF Björklöven	Elitserien	34	12	14	26	20	3	1	1	2	4
1984–85	IF Björklöven	Elitserien	25	6	6	12	14	3	0	1	1	6
1985–86	Skellefteå HC	Elitserien	30	22	19	41	14	—	—	—	—	—
1986–87	Skellefteå HC	Elitserien	36	19	12	31	12	—	—	—	—	—
1987–88	Skellefteå HC	Elitserien	21	7	6	13	14	—	—	—	—	—
1987–88	Skellefteå HC	Allsvenskan D1	18	14	11	25	8	—	—	—	—	—
1989–90	Clemensnäs IF	Division 1	21	16	12	28	24	—	—	—	—	—
1990–91	Lejonströms SK	Division 1	24	17	16	33	24	—	—	—	—	—
Elitserien totals			283	130	98	228	196	9	2	2	4	10
Division 1 totals			145	104	84	188	82	—	—	—	—	—
