= Rickard Hugg =

Swedish ice hockey player (born 1999)

- Born: 18 January 1999 (age 27) Hudiksvall, Sweden
- Height: 5 ft 10 in (178 cm)
- Weight: 189 lb (86 kg; 13 st 7 lb)
- Position: Centre/Left wing
- Shoots: Left
- SHL team Former teams: Skellefteå AIK; Leksands IF
- NHL draft: Undrafted
- Playing career: 2016–present

Rickard Hugg (born 18 January 1999) is a Swedish professional ice hockey player who is currently playing for Skellefteå AIK of the Swedish Hockey League (SHL).

== Playing career ==
Hugg made his SHL debut playing for Leksands IF in December 2016, and played 11 games with the team during the 2016–17 SHL season.

With ambition to play in the NHL and despite passing through the 2017 NHL entry draft, Hugg was selected 94th overall at the 2017 CHL Import Draft by the Kitchener Rangers of the Ontario Hockey League (OHL).

He played two seasons in North America with the Rangers, contributing offensively with 73 points in just 62 games in the 2018–19 season.

On 16 April 2019, while still draft eligible Hugg opted to return to Sweden to continue his development, agreeing to a two-year contract with Skellefteå AIK of the SHL.

== Career statistics ==
Bold indicates led league

=== Regular season and playoffs ===
| | | | Regular season | | | | | Playoffs |
| Season | Team | League | GP | G | A | Pts | PIM | GP | G | A | Pts | PIM |
|---|---|---|---|---|---|---|---|---|---|---|---|---|
| 2015–16 | Leksands IF | J20 | 42 | 13 | 30 | 43 | 2 | 3 | 1 | 0 | 1 | 0 |
| 2015–16 | Leksands IF | Allsv | 1 | 0 | 0 | 0 | 0 | — | — | — | — | — |
| 2016-17 | Leksands IF | J20 | 32 | 13 | 25 | 38 | 2 | 5 | 0 | 4 | 4 | 2 |
| 2016–17 | Leksands IF | SHL | 11 | 0 | 1 | 1 | 2 | — | — | — | — | — |
| 2017–18 | Kitchener Rangers | OHL | 66 | 6 | 26 | 32 | 2 | 19 | 3 | 6 | 9 | 2 |
| 2018–19 | Kitchener Rangers | OHL | 62 | 33 | 40 | 73 | 4 | 4 | 1 | 0 | 1 | 0 |
| 2019–20 | Skellefteå AIK | SHL | 49 | 3 | 10 | 13 | 8 | — | — | — | — | — |
| 2020–21 | Skellefteå AIK | SHL | 52 | 11 | 6 | 17 | 10 | 12 | 3 | 0 | 3 | 27 |
| 2021–22 | Skellefteå AIK | SHL | 52 | 17 | 23 | 40 | 0 | 6 | 2 | 2 | 4 | 25 |
| 2022–23 | Skellefteå AIK | SHL | 52 | 13 | 24 | 37 | 4 | 16 | 0 | **12** | **12** | 6 |
| 2023–24 | Skellefteå AIK | SHL | 52 | 11 | 24 | 35 | 4 | 14 | 4 | 4 | 8 | 4 |
| 2024–25 | Skellefteå AIK | SHL | 50 | 19 | 19 | 38 | 14 | 11 | 2 | 2 | 4 | 0 |
| SHL totals | | | 318 | 74 | 107 | 181 | 42 | 59 | 11 | 20 | 31 | 62 |

=== International ===
| Year | Team | Event | Result | GP | G | A | Pts | PIM |
|---|---|---|---|---|---|---|---|---|
| 2016 | Sweden | U17 | 1st place, gold medalist(s) | 6 | 3 | 2 | 5 | 4 |
| 2016 | Sweden | U18 | 2nd place, silver medalist(s) | 7 | 1 | 3 | 4 | 2 |
| 2016 | Sweden | IH18 | 4th | 5 | 2 | 0 | 2 | 4 |
| 2017 | Sweden | U18 | 4th | 7 | 1 | 3 | 4 | 2 |
| 2019 | Sweden | WJC | 5th | 4 | 1 | 1 | 2 | 0 |
| Junior totals | | | | 29 | 8 | 9 | 17 | 12 |

== Awards and honours ==
| Award | Year |
|---|---|
SHL
| Le Mat Trophy | 2024 |
