= Filip Larsson =

Swedish ice hockey player (born 1998)

- Born: 17 August 1998 (age 27) Stockholm, Sweden
- Height: 6 ft 2 in (188 cm)
- Weight: 194 lb (88 kg; 13 st 12 lb)
- Position: Goaltender
- Catches: Left
- SHL team Former teams: Leksands IF; Grand Rapids Griffins; Frederikshavn White Hawks; WBS Penguins
- National team: Sweden
- NHL draft: 167th overall, 2016; Detroit Red Wings
- Playing career: 2019–present

Filip Larsson (born 17 August 1998) is a Swedish professional ice hockey goaltender for Leksands IF of the Swedish Hockey League (SHL).

== Playing career ==
Larsson played junior hockey for the Tri-City Storm of the United States Hockey League (USHL); Larsson was named the USHL Goaltender of the Year for the 2017–18 season.

In the 2018–19 season, Larsson played college hockey for the Denver Pioneers.

On 29 April 2024, Larsson signed a two-year contract with the Pittsburgh Penguins of the National Hockey League (NHL).

On 3 February 2026, Larsson's NHL contract was terminated; on 4 February, he signed with Leksands IF.

== Career statistics ==
			Regular season									Playoffs
Season	Team	League	GP	W	L	OTL	MIN	GA	SO	GAA	SV%	GP	W	L	MIN	GA	SO	GAA	SV%
2017–18	Tri-City Storm	USHL	30	18	10	0	1677	46	7	1.65	.941	0	0	0	0	0	0	0	0
2018–19	University of Denver	NCHC	22	13	6	3	1292	42	4	1.95	.932	0	0	0	0	0	0	0	0
2019–20	Grand Rapids Griffins	AHL	7	2	5	0	389	26	0	4.01	.843	0	0	0	0	0	0	0	0
2019–20	Toledo Walleye	ECHL	10	4	6	0	595	27	0	2.72	.910	0	0	0	0	0	0	0	0
2020–21	Almtuna IS	Allsv	6	1	4	0	322	19	1	3.54	.883	0	0	0	0	0	0	0	0
2020–21	Frederikshavn White Hawks	DEN	10	–	–	–	–	–	–	5.31	.888	7	–	–	–	–	–	3.70	–
2021–22	HV71	Allsv	18	13	4	0	1068	40	2	2.25	.911	0	0	0	0	0	0	0	0
2022–23	Kristianstads IK	Allsv	36	16	18	0	2102	81	3	2.31	.925	9	5	3	558	15	3	1.61	.945
2023–24	Leksands IF	SHL	28	19	9	0	1615	52	5	1.93	.920	5	3	2	314	10	1	1.91	.929
2024–25	Wilkes-Barre/Scranton Penguins	AHL	26	12	9	3	1460	69	5	2.84	.910	0	0	0	0	0	0	0	0
2025–26	Wilkes-Barre/Scranton Penguins	AHL	9	3	2	1	445	26	0	3.51	.876	—	—	—	—	—	—	—	—
AHL totals			42	17	16	4	2294	121	5	3.16	.894	0	0	0	0	0	0	0	0
SHL totals			28	19	9	0	1615	52	5	1.93	.920	5	3	2	314	10	1	1.91	.929
