= Arvid Lundberg =

Swedish ice hockey player

- Born: September 29, 1994 (age 31) Skellefteå, Sweden
- Height: 6 ft 1 in (185 cm)
- Weight: 192 lb (87 kg; 13 st 10 lb)
- Position: Defence
- Shoots: Left
- SHL team Former teams: Skellefteå AIK; Växjö Lakers
- Playing career: 2012–present

Arvid Lundberg (born September 29, 1994) is a Swedish professional ice hockey defenceman. He is currently playing with Skellefteå AIK of the Swedish Hockey League (SHL). He has also previously played with the Växjö Lakers.

Lundberg made his Elitserien debut playing with Skellefteå AIK during the 2011–12 Elitserien season.

== Awards and honours ==
Award	Year
SHL
Le Mat Trophy	2024
