= Empty net goal =

Sporting terminology

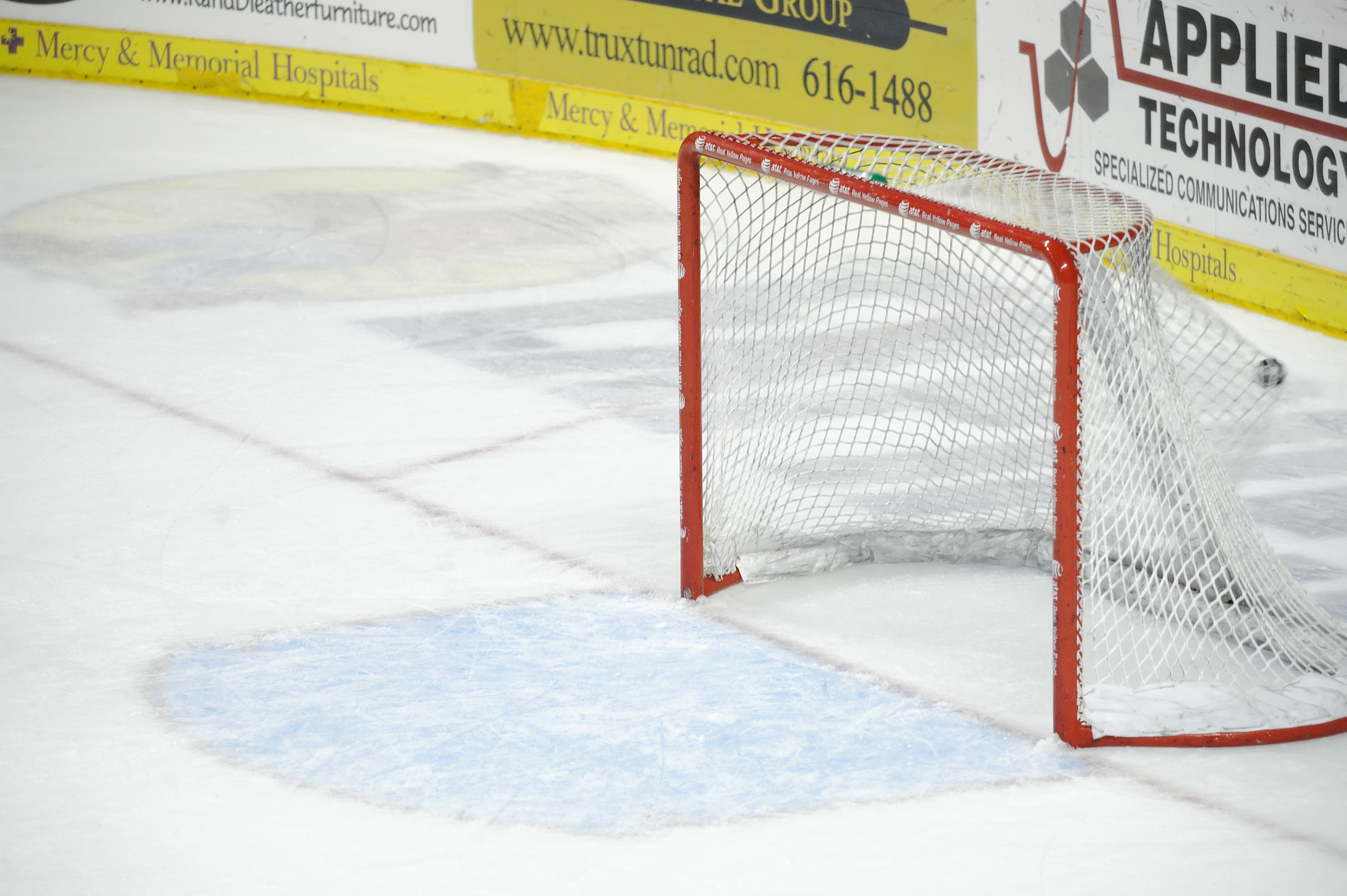
Empty netter scored by the Alaska Aces against the Bakersfield Condors.

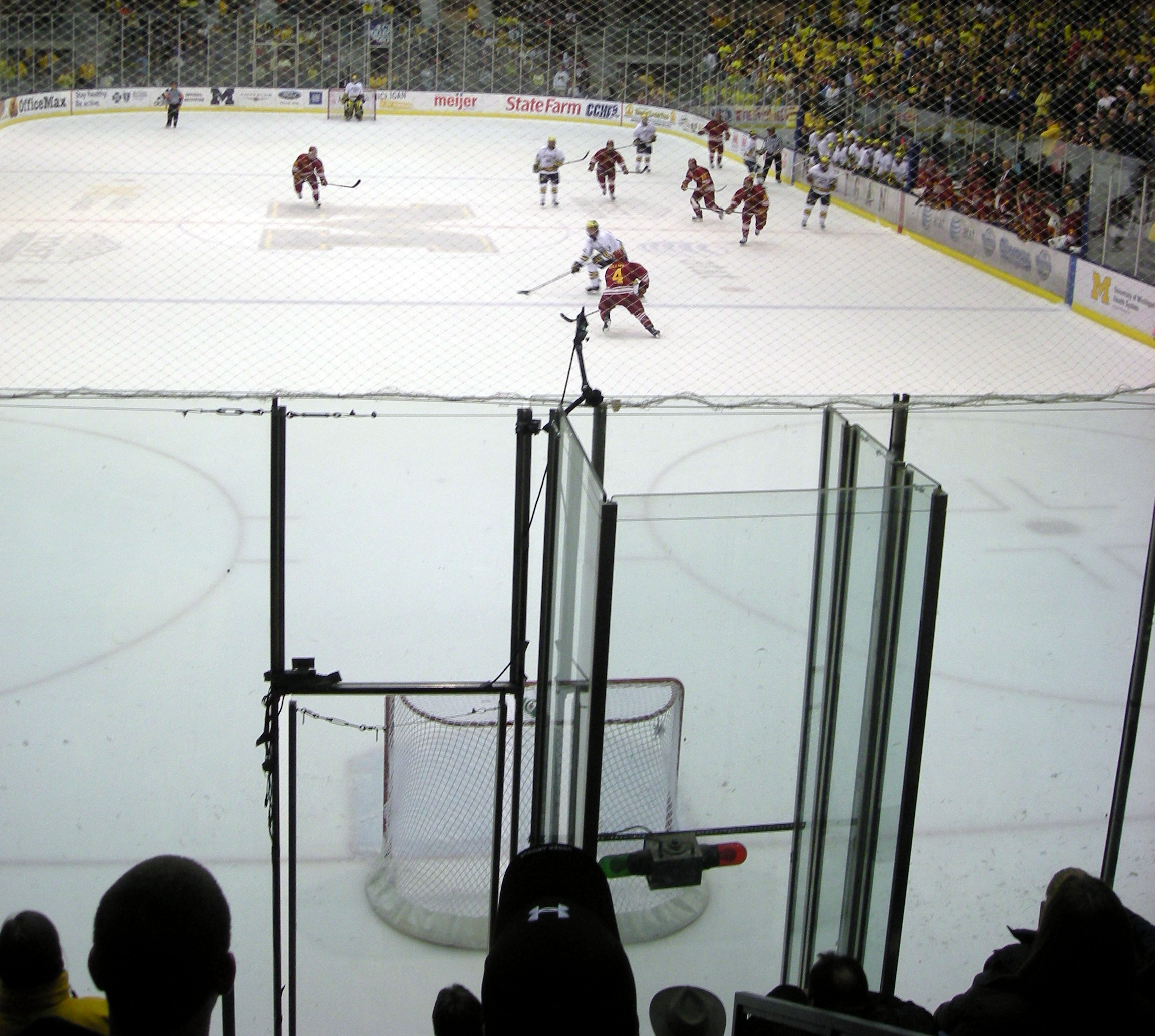
The Michigan Wolverines attempt an empty net goal against the Ferris State Bulldogs.

An empty net goal, abbreviated as EN or ENG and colloquially called an empty netter, occurs in several team sports when a team scores a goal into a net with no goalkeeper present.

== Ice hockey ==
Empty net goals usually occur in ice hockey in one of two scenarios in which the team conceding the goal has replaced its goaltender (goalie) with an extra attacker:

1. In the final minutes of a game, if a team is losing, they will often pull the goalie, leaving the net defenseless, for an extra attacker, in order to have a better chance of scoring to either tie or get within one goal. However, if the team holding the lead gains control of the puck, they will often shoot at the empty net after clearing center ice. It is less common for a team to shoot from their own zone at an empty net because icing could occur if the shooter misses the net. A notable instance of this happening occurred on January 21, 2022, when Pittsburgh Penguins star Sidney Crosby hit a bank shot intended for Bryan Rust while the opposing Columbus Blue Jackets were on the extra attacker, only for the puck to go into the empty net; coincidentially, the goal was Crosby's 3rd of the game, earning him a hat trick for the game. In some circumstances, a team may also pull their goalie when they are on a two-man advantage, even if not nearing the end of the game, to gain an advantage of six attackers to three to even further increase the chances of scoring.
2. In the case of a delayed penalty, the non-offending team will often pull their goaltender for an extra attacker in this situation as well. Empty net goals that are scored in this case are accidental own goals because the whistle would be blown if the offending team touches the puck. An own goal is usually scored when a forward from the non-offending team passes backwards to a defenseman that is not in position, and the puck slides all the way down the ice into the team's own net, or when players of the non-offending team are being pressured in their own zone and they accidentally knock it into the net. This goal is credited to the last player on the scoring team who touched the puck.

=== Goaltender's statistics ===
Simon Edvinsson scoring an empty net goal for the Grand Rapids Griffins

Empty net goals are charged to the goaltender that was previously in net as empty net goals against (abbreviated as EN, ENG, or ENA). Empty net goals do not count against a goaltender's goals against average or their save percentage, but rather are tracked separately. A goaltender can, however, be credited with a loss as the result of an empty net goal (for example, if a team is trailing by one goal, pulls its goalie, concedes an empty net goal, but then scores another but does not score a tying goal before time expires; since no goaltender was on the ice for the game winning goal, the loss is pegged to the last goaltender on the ice). In an unusual case, goaltender Adam Wilcox, in his lone NHL appearance to date, did not concede a goal but was credited with the loss because of the aforementioned scenario.

== Association football ==
An empty net goal can occur in soccer in a situation where a team is currently drawing the match or losing by a goal late in a game where the team needs a goal to avoid elimination. Often in these situations the goalkeeper of the losing team will go into the attacking area of his team during a set piece, such as a corner kick. In this case it is then possible for the defending team to score into the empty net if they are able to win possession of the ball.

Examples of this include Xabi Alonso scoring for Liverpool against Luton Town in the FA Cup, Ryan McCann scoring for Queen of the South against Dundee in the Scottish Cup, Son Heung-min scoring for South Korea against Germany at the 2018 FIFA World Cup and Pity Martínez scoring the last goal of his team against Boca Juniors in the second leg of the 2018 Copa Libertadores Finals at the Santiago Bernabéu Stadium.

== Handball ==
With rule changes in the 2010s, the goalie can also be pulled in handball. Unlike the soccer and ice hockey examples, this is not only done in desperate situations near the end of a game, as scoring even on a goal with a goalkeeper in it is easier in handball than ice hockey or soccer. A loss of ball possession and the inability to quickly get a goalie back in time almost always results in an empty net goal.
