= Skellefteå AIK =

Sports club in Skellefteå, Sweden

- City: Skellefteå, Sweden
- League: Swedish Hockey League
- Founded: 1 July 1921
- Home arena: Skellefteå Kraft Arena (capacity: 5,801)
- Colors
- General manager: Erik Forssell
- Head coach: Daniel Hermansson
- Captain: Jonathan Pudas
- Website: skellefteaaik.se

Championships
- Regular season titles: 6 (1981, 2013, 2014, 2015, 2016, 2026)
- Le Mat Trophy: 5 (1978, 2013, 2014, 2024, 2026)

Skellefteå AIK is a Swedish professional ice hockey club from Skellefteå. They currently play In the Swedish Hockey League. They play their home games in Skellefteå Kraft Arena, which seats 5,801 spectators. The team has won the Swedish Championship five times – in 1978, 2013, 2014, 2024 and 2026. They reached the SHL championship finals for six consecutive years between 2011–2016, tying Färjestad BK's streak between 2001 and 2006, winning two times.

== History ==
=== Early years ===
Skellefteå AIK was founded on 1 July 1921 at Café Norden in Skellefteå, although ice hockey was not played until 1943, with only training matches being played the first season. In the 1943–44 season, the club played in the local league Skellefteserien, which could not be finished due to unsuitable hockey weather as the games were played outdoors.

In 1955 Skellefteå qualified for the highest league in Sweden. Around this time the team was led by the so-called "Mosquito Line", which consisted of Anders "Akka" Andersson, "Garvis" Määttä and Kalle Hedlund. In the 1957–58 season they won the Allsvenskan's northern group and later finished second in SM-serien, only one point behind the winner Djurgårdens IF. Skellefteå AIK then played in Division 1 North until 1967. The club had difficulties qualifying for continued play in the Division 1 series but in 1975 the series was won and Skellefteå later finished in fourth place in SM-serien.

=== Elitserien ===
When the Swedish Elite League under the name Elitserien was formed in 1975, Skellefteå AIK was one of the teams participating.

In the 1977–78 regular season Martin Karlsson led the league in goals and points while Hardy Nilsson was the league's most penalized player. Skellefteå went on to win the playoffs led by a strong performance by Göran Lindblom (five goals and four assists in five games), becoming Swedish champions in 1978, and in 1981 Skellefteå won the regular season series.

In 1985, the club's hockey organization split from the mother club, and competed as Skellefteå HC until 1991, when the club would retake the Skellefteå AIK name.

=== Relegation ===
In 1990 Skellefteå was relegated but after 16 seasons of play in the Swedish second league (Allsvenskan). Skellefteå again qualified for the highest series and has played in Elitserien since 2006–07.

=== Return to the top tier ===
In their first year after promoting from the Swedish second league to Elitserien (now named the SHL), Skellefteå AIK became the best newcomer in Elitserien at that time with 73 points in 55 games. At one point during the 2007–08 season, Skellefteå led the league for the first time in 30 years. They also qualified for the playoffs for the first time since 1981 as the 8th seed. In the quarterfinals, Skellefteå were beaten by the eventual champions HV71 by 4–1 in games. At the end of the 2008–09 season, Skellefteå qualified for the playoffs again; in the quarterfinals, Skellefteå defeated Linköpings HC in 7 games, and in the series Skellefteå came back from a 1–3 deficit to win 4–3 in games. In game seven, Skellefteå won an overtime game that had gone to the 6th period (and thus had become the third longest playoff game in Elitserien history) with a goal by Kimmo Koskenkorva. In the semifinals, Skellefteå fell in four games to Färjestad BK who went on to win the Swedish Championship.

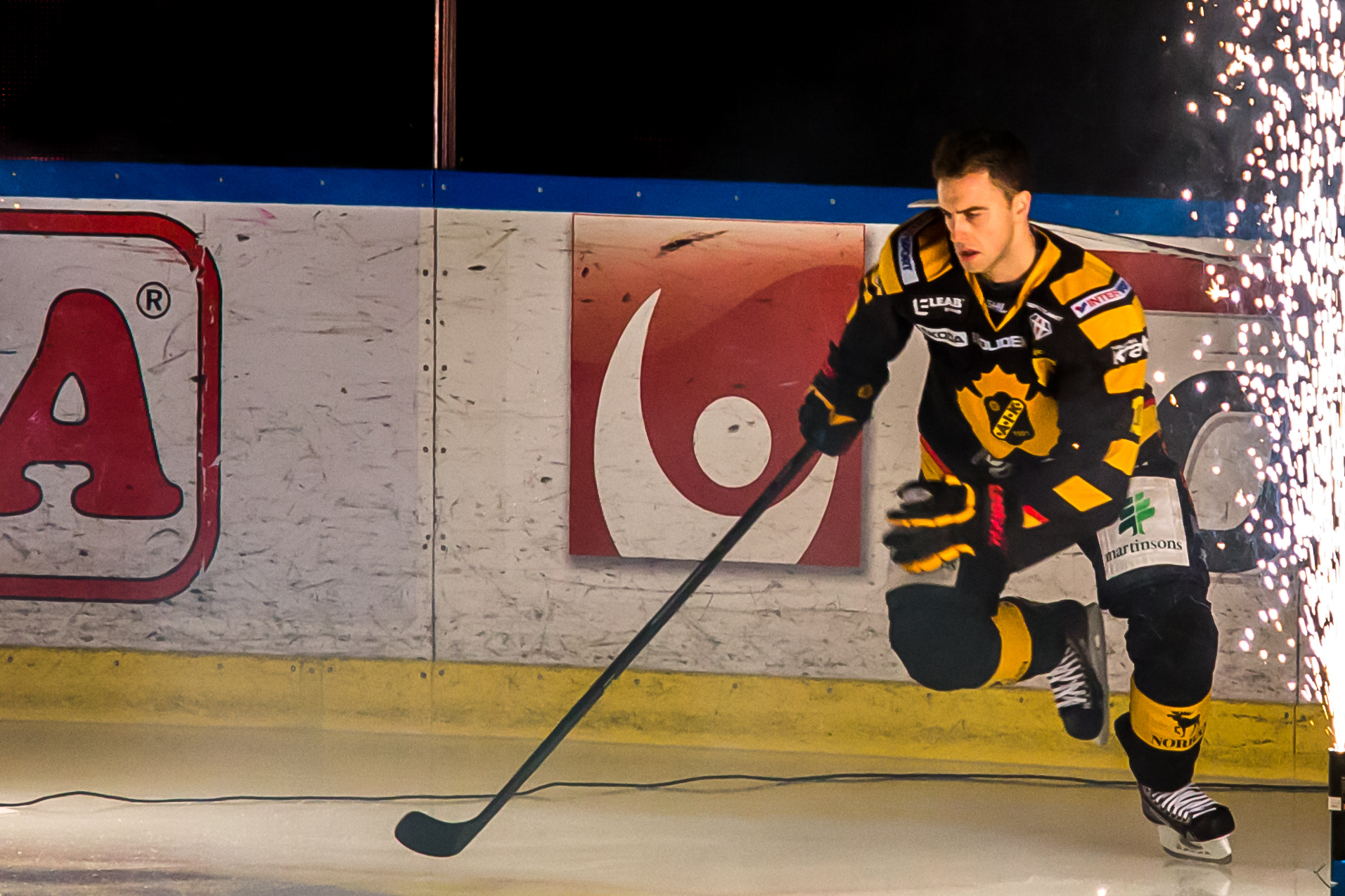
Joakim Lindström in Skellefteå AIK

The following season, Skellefteå faced Färjestad in the playoffs once again, this time in the quarterfinals. Skellefteå won the series in seven games and went on to play HV71. HV won in five games on their way to become the 2010 champions.

Skellefteå had the three highest scoring players in the league in the 2010–11 season – Joakim Lindström, Mikko Lehtonen and David Rundblad. In the playoffs Skellefteå made it to the finals for the first time in 33 years, but were defeated in five games by Färjestad.

In the 2011–12 season, Skellefteå would return to the Swedish Championship Finals, where they lost to Brynäs IF in six games.

In the 2012–13 season, the team won the regular season. In the playoffs, Skellefteå once again reached the Finals, where they met their northernmost rival, Luleå HF. Skellefteå swept Luleå in four straight games 4–0 and clinched the Swedish Championship for the first time since 1978, and only the second time in club history. Skellefteå finished the playoffs with an impressive 12–1 record, and became the first team since 2003 to sweep their opponents in the Finals.

In the 2013–14 SHL season, Skellefteå once again won the regular season. In the playoffs, Skellefteå reached the Finals for the fourth consecutive year, where they met Färjestad BK. Like in 2013, Skellefteå swept their opponents in the Finals in four straight games 4–0. Skellefteå clinched the Swedish Championship title for the third time in club history, and became the first team to defend the Swedish Championship title since Djurgårdens IF did so with their consecutive Swedish Championship titles in 2000 and 2001. Skellefteå AIK also became the first team since Brynäs IF in 1976–77 to win consecutive Swedish Championships by not losing a single game in both Finals series. Their 8–1 crush in game three marked the biggest goal margin (7 goals) in a single Finals game in SHL history.

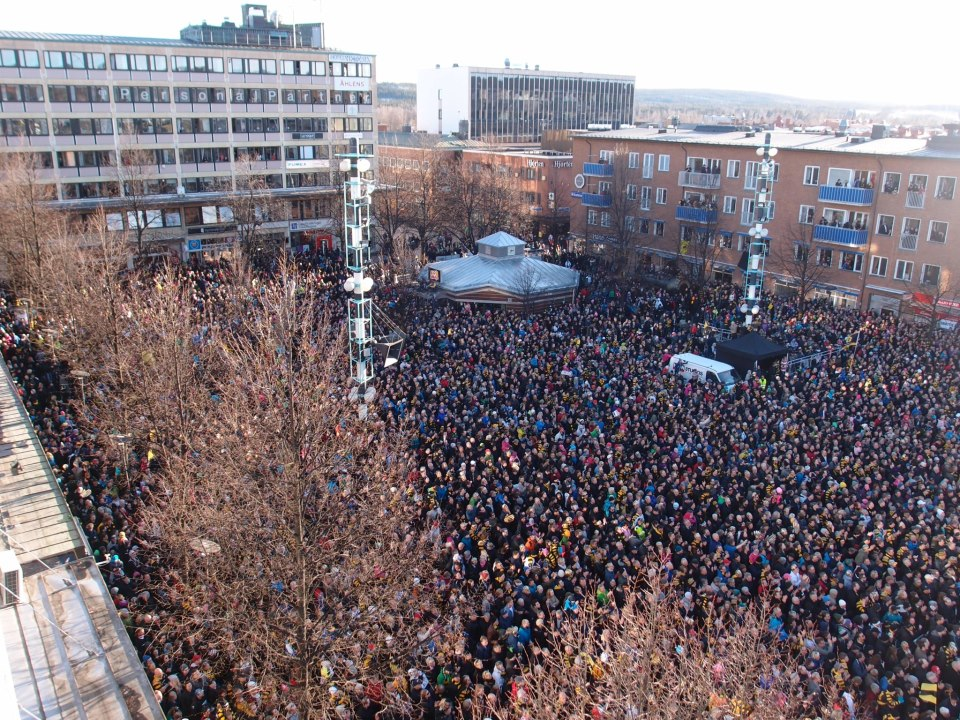
10,000 citizens of Skellefteå, celebrating Skellefteå AIK's first Swedish Championship title in 35 years.

In the 2014–15 SHL season, Skellefteå won their third consecutive regular season trophy. Doing so after having lost 14 players of top European class however, experts were impressed by the consistency of their managing, training and playing style. Going into the playoffs after their impressive regular season win, Skellefteå once again were huge favorites to win the le mat trophy. Although experts generally agreed that they were going to face a tougher challenge this year.

In the round of quarter finals Skellefteå once again had to face their opponent from the finals of 2012, Brynäs IF. Even though Skellefteå did sweep Brynäs in four consecutive quarterfinal games, some people started wondering if the dynasty of Skellefteå was over. Those wonderings mostly appeared due to the tightness and even scorelines of the quarter final games.

In the 2015 semifinals, Skellefteå for the third consecutive year had to face Linköpings HC. Once again Skellefteå was going to prove the experts, who predicted a tight and tough series of games, wrong. With the round of semifinals ending 4–1 in favor to Skellefteå, they went into the finals as huge favorites.

The first game in the round of finals 2015 was played on 12 April between Skellefteå AIK and Växjö Lakers. The Lakers surprised most people when they "stole" Skellefteå's home game and won with two goals to one. The second game of the finals was by most media described as a "do or die game" for Skellefteå, arguing that a 2-0 lead for Växjö would be too difficult for Skellefteå to turn into a victory. Skellefteå AIK themselves however did not agree at all, but did emphasize the needs of improvement in the play around the nets. This was something they did manage to improve and it resulted in a clean sheet victory with three goals to nil. With the impressive 0–3 victory behind them, Skellefteå AIK was once again seen as the major favorites to win the le mat trophy.

== Season-by-season record ==
Season	Level	Division	Record		Avg. home atnd.	Notes
Season	Level	Division	Position	W-OT-L	Avg. home atnd.	Notes
This is a partial list featuring the past seasons. For prior seasons, see List of Skellefteå AIK seasons.
2020–21	Tier 1	SHL	4th	24–8–5–15	18	
2020–21	Swedish Championship playoffs		—	6–5	0	Won in quarterfinals, 4–3 vs Luleå; Lost in semifinals, 2–3 vs Rögle
2021–22	Tier 1	SHL	3rd	27–5–3–17	3,709	
2021–22	Swedish Championship playoffs		—	2–4	5,431	Lost in quarterfinals, 2–4 vs Färjestad BK
2022–23	Tier 1	SHL	2nd	27–6–6–13	4,936	
2022–23	Swedish Championship playoffs		—	9–8	5,630	Won in quarterfinals, 4–2 vs Rögle; Won in semifinals, 4–2 vs Örebro; (silver) Lost in finals, 1–4 vs Växjö
2023–24	Tier 1	SHL	3rd	27–6–4–15	4,943	
2023–24	Swedish Championship playoffs		—	12–4	5,759	Won in quarterfinals, 4–0 vs Linköping; Won in semifinals, 4–3 vs Frölunda; Winner in finals, 4–1 vs Rögle; (gold) 2024 Swedish Champions (4th title)
2024–25	Tier 1	SHL	5th	25–3–3–21	5,269	
2024–25	Swedish Championship playoffs		—	5–6	5,801	Won in quarterfinals, 4–2 vs Färjestad; Lost in semifinals, 1–4 vs Brynäs

== Players and personnel ==
=== Current roster ===
Updated 28 July 2025.

No.	Nat	Player	Pos	S/G	Age	Acquired	Birthplace
29	(Denmark)	Mikkel Aagaard	LW	L	30	2025	Frederikshavn, Denmark
4	(Sweden)	Rasmus Bergqvist	D	L	20	2024	Skellefteå, Sweden
15	(Sweden)	Lars Bryggman	LW	L	33	2025	Umeå, Sweden
71	(Sweden)	Jonathan Davidsson	RW	R	29	2024	Tyresö, Sweden
57	(Sweden)	Emil Djuse	D	L	32	2025	Östersund, Sweden
6	(Sweden)	Måns Forsfjäll	D	L	23	2020	Skellefteå, Sweden
33	(Sweden)	Zeb Forsfjäll	C	L	21	2021	Skellefteå, Sweden
3	(Sweden)	Viktor Grahn	D	L	27	2025	Piteå, Sweden
7	(Sweden)	Frans Haara	D	R	22	2023	Haparanda, Sweden
96	(Sweden)	Rickard Hugg (A)	LW	L	27	2019	Hudiksvall, Sweden
25	(Sweden)	Pontus Johansson	D	L	24	2024	Stockholm, Sweden
22	(Sweden)	Jonathan Johnson	C	L	33	2020	Gävle, Sweden
14	(Sweden)	Andreas Johnsson	LW	L	31	2023	Gävle, Sweden
43	(Norway)	Max Krogdahl	D	R	27	2025	Bærum, Norway
31	(Finland)	Jani Lampinen	G	L	23	2025	Vantaa, Finland
91	(Sweden)	Victor Laz	C	L	29	2025	Ronneby, Sweden
24	(Sweden)	Oscar Lindberg	C	L	34	2023	Skellefteå, Sweden
12	(Sweden)	Valter Lindberg	C	L	19	2024	Skellefteå, Sweden
17	(Sweden)	Pär Lindholm (A)	C	L	34	2022	Kusmark, Sweden
30	(Sweden)	Gustaf Lindvall	G	L	35	2016	Skellefteå, Sweden
52	(Sweden)	Arvid Lundberg	D	L	32	2022	Skellefteå, Sweden
8	(Slovakia)	Oliver Okuliar	LW	L	26	2025	Trenčín, Slovakia
64	(Sweden)	Jonathan Pudas (C)	D	R	33	2021	Kiruna, Sweden
9	(Sweden)	Victor Stjernborg	C	L	23	2025	Malmö, Sweden
32	(Sweden)	Linus Söderström	G	L	29	2022	Stockholm, Sweden
27	(Sweden)	Oskar Vuollet	C	L	20	2023	Skellefteå, Sweden

=== Team captains ===
- Göran Lindblom, 1982–85
- Thomas Hedin, 1985–88
- Martin Pettersson, 1988–91
- Tony Barthelsson, 1991–92
- Daniel Pettersson, 1993–98
- Pär Mikaelsson, 1998–05
- Magnus Wernblom, 2005–07
- Mikael Renberg, 2007–08
- Christoffer Norgren, 2008–10
- Fredrik Warg, 2010–11
- Jimmie Ericsson, 2011–14
- Erik Forssell, 2014–15
- Jimmie Ericsson, 2015–17
- Pontus Petterström, 2017–18
- Jimmie Ericsson, 2018–19
- Oscar Möller, 2019–2022
- Jonathan Pudas, 2023-present

== Franchise records and leaders ==
=== Regular season ===
- Most goals in a season: Magnus Wernblom, 37 (2005–06)
- Most assists in a season: Bud Holloway, 51 (2012–13)
- Most points in a season: Bud Holloway, 71 (2012–13)
- Most penalty minutes in a season: Joakim Lindström, 134 (2010–11)
- Most points in a season, defenseman: Johan Åkerman, 61 (2005–06)
- Most shutouts in a season: Johan Backlund, 8 (2002–03)

=== Scoring leaders ===
These are the top-ten point-scorers of Skellefteå AIK in the SHL/Elitserien. Figures are updated after each completed season.

Note: Pos = Position; GP = Games Played; G = Goals; A = Assists; Pts = Points; P/G = Points per game; = current Skellefteå AIK player

Points
Player	Pos	GP	G	A	Pts	P/G
Joakim Lindström	W	526	179	313	492	.93
Oscar Möller	RW	445	182	163	345	.77
Jimmie Ericsson	W	518	105	173	278	.54
Roland Stoltz	F	374	133	132	265	.71
Göran Lindblom	D	403	71	186	257	.64
Jonathan Pudas	D	340	68	183	251	.73
Bud Holloway	W	280	81	142	223	.80
Erik Forssell	C	443	94	127	221	.50
Pär Lindholm	C	354	82	120	202	.57
Anders Söderberg	LW	314	78	123	201	.64

== Trophies and awards ==
=== Team ===
Le Mat Trophy

- 1977–78
- 2012–13
- 2013–14
- 2023–24

=== Individual ===
Guldpucken

- (Sweden) Hans Svedberg: 1957–58
- (Sweden) Anders Andersson: 1960–61, 1961–62
- (Sweden) Jimmie Ericsson: 2012–13

Guldhjälmen

- (Canada) Bud Holloway: 2012–13
- (Sweden) Joakim Lindström: 2013–14

Peter Forsberg Trophy

- (Sweden) Jimmie Ericsson: 2012–13
- (Sweden) Joakim Lindström: 2013–14

Håkan Loob Trophy

- (Sweden) Martin Karlsson: 1977–78
- (Finland) Mikko Lehtonen: 2010–11

Salming Trophy

- (Sweden) David Rundblad: 2010–11
- (Sweden) Tim Heed: 2014–15
- (Sweden) Niclas Burström: 2015–16
- (Sweden) Axel Sandin Pellikka: 2023–24

Stefan Liv Memorial Trophy

- (Sweden) Oscar Lindberg: 2013
- (Sweden) Joakim Lindström: 2014
- (Sweden) Linus Söderström: 2024

Rinkens Riddare

- (Sweden) Anders Söderberg: 2006–07
- (Sweden) Oscar Möller: 2013–14

Preceded by Brynäs IF	Swedish ice hockey champions 1978	Succeeded by Modo AIK
Preceded by Brynäs IF	Swedish ice hockey champions 2013, 2014	Succeeded by Växjö Lakers
