= Tom Nilsson =

Swedish ice hockey player

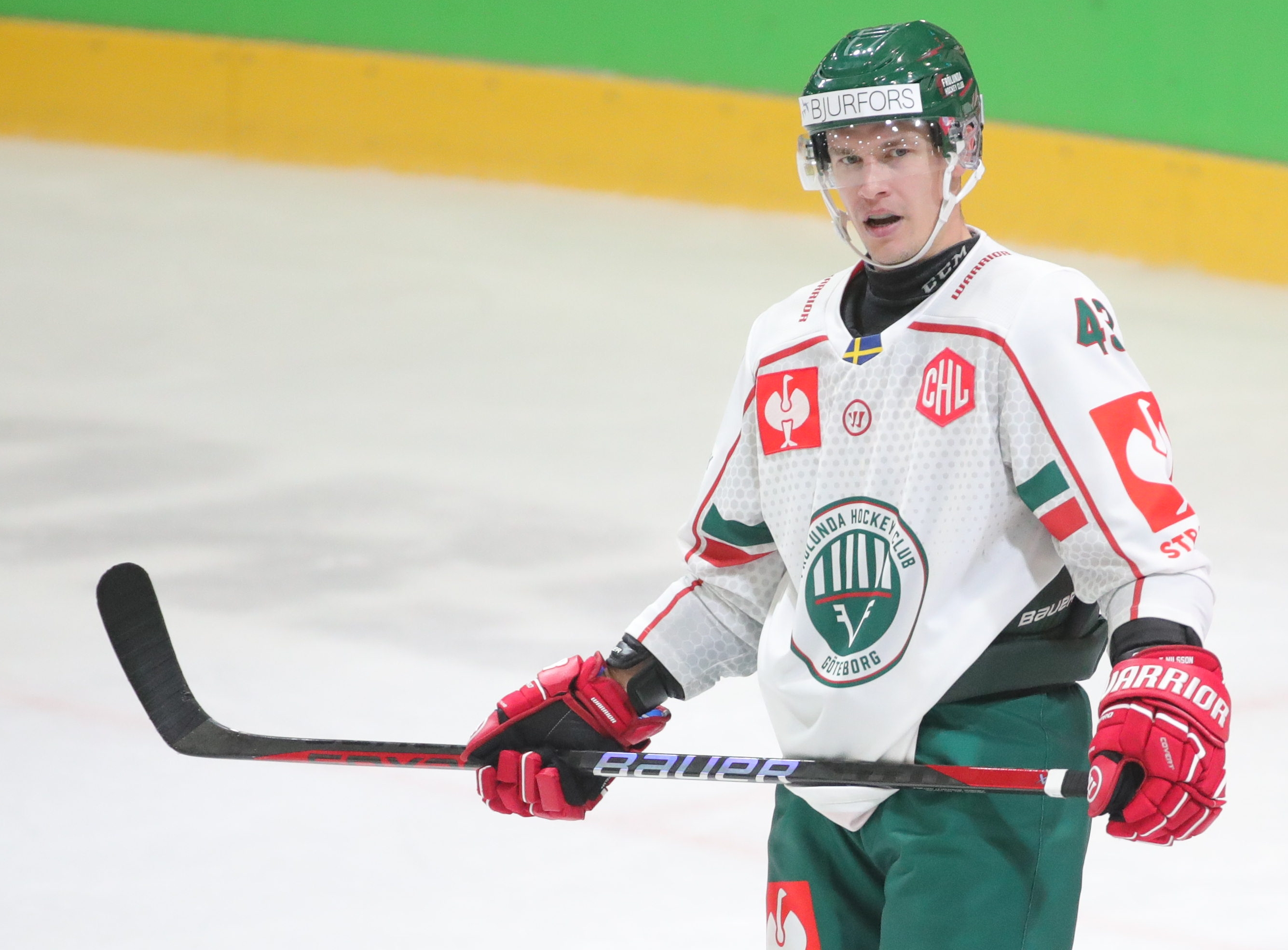
- Nilsson playing for Frölunda in 2022.
- Born: August 19, 1993 (age 32) Tyresö, Sweden
- Height: 6 ft 0 in (183 cm)
- Weight: 176 lb (80 kg; 12 st 8 lb)
- Position: Defence
- Shoots: Right
- SHL team Former teams: Frölunda HC; Djurgårdens IF
- NHL draft: 100th overall, 2011; Toronto Maple Leafs
- Playing career: 2010–present

Tom Nilsson (born August 19, 1993) is a Swedish professional ice hockey defenceman, currently playing under contract to Frölunda HC in the Swedish Hockey League (SHL). Nilsson was drafted by the Toronto Maple Leafs, 100th overall in the 2011 NHL entry draft, while playing in the Swedish HockeyAllsvenskan with Mora IK.

== Playing career ==
On March 19, 2013, Nilsson was signed to a three-year entry-level contract with the Toronto Maple Leafs. He was loaned to further develop in the Swedish Hockey League with Frölunda HC for the 2013–14 season. After his first season in North America with the Maple Leafs AHL affiliate, the Toronto Marlies, Nilsson was traded approaching the final year of his contract, along with four other prospects, to the New York Islanders in exchange for Michael Grabner on September 17, 2015.

On October 8, 2015, after an unsuccessful attempt to make the Islanders roster and little interest in continuing in the AHL, Nilsson was mutually released from contract with the Islanders. He returned to Sweden and re-joined Frölunda HC into the 2015–16 season, on a three-year contract on October 9, 2015.

After his first season in his return with Frölunda HC, in which he won the Swedish championship as well as the Champions Hockey League, Nilsson was again attracted by NHL interest and signed a one-year, two-way contract with the Vancouver Canucks on May 26, 2016. Unable to make the Canucks opening night roster, Nilsson was reassigned to AHL affiliate, the Utica Comets where he played out the duration of his contract for the 2016–17 season.

As an impending restricted free agent, Nilsson opted to return to his homeland in agreeing to a two-year deal with an optional third year with Djurgårdens IF of the SHL on May 2, 2017.

Following Djurgårdens IF relegation to the HockeyAllsvenskan in the 2021–22 season, Nilsson opted to remain in the SHL by originally agreeing to a two-year contract with Örebro HK on 16 April 2022. However, before the commencement of his deal, Nilsson opted to cancel his contract and later returned to Frölunda HC for the 2022–23 season on 18 July 2022.

== Career statistics ==
=== Regular season and playoffs ===
			Regular season					Playoffs
Season	Team	League	GP	G	A	Pts	PIM	GP	G	A	Pts	PIM
2009–10	Mora IK	J20	3	0	0	0	0	—	—	—	—	—
2010–11	Mora IK	J20	37	2	6	8	26	—	—	—	—	—
2010–11	Mora IK	Allsv	3	0	0	0	0	10	0	1	1	8
2011–12	Mora IK	J20	10	0	2	2	2	2	0	1	1	0
2011–12	Mora IK	Allsv	44	4	6	10	45	—	—	—	—	—
2012–13	Mora IK	J20	3	0	0	0	0	2	3	2	5	0
2012–13	Mora IK	Allsv	42	1	3	4	18	—	—	—	—	—
2013–14	Frölunda HC	SHL	50	2	2	4	22	7	0	0	0	2
2014–15	Toronto Marlies	AHL	44	1	5	6	26	4	0	0	0	2
2015–16	Frölunda HC	SHL	37	1	6	7	34	7	1	1	2	2
2016–17	Utica Comets	AHL	17	0	3	3	10	—	—	—	—	—
2017–18	Djurgårdens IF	SHL	18	1	3	4	8	9	0	0	0	6
2018–19	Djurgårdens IF	SHL	48	1	9	10	16	14	0	1	1	2
2019–20	Djurgårdens IF	SHL	51	4	9	13	18	—	—	—	—	—
2020–21	Djurgårdens IF	SHL	46	1	5	6	22	3	1	0	1	2
2021–22	Djurgårdens IF	SHL	24	2	3	5	16	—	—	—	—	—
2022–23	Frölunda HC	SHL	47	3	3	6	18	12	0	1	1	2
2023–24	Frölunda HC	SHL	43	5	2	7	14	11	3	1	4	4
2024–25	Frölunda HC	SHL	45	3	4	7	14	12	1	2	3	6
SHL totals			409	23	46	69	182	75	6	6	12	26

=== International ===
Year	Team	Event	Result	GP	G	A	Pts	PIM
2011	Sweden	U18	2nd place, silver medalist(s)	6	0	1	1	6
2013	Sweden	WJC	2nd place, silver medalist(s)	6	0	2	2	4
Junior totals				12	0	3	3	10
