= Christoffer Norgren =

Swedish ice hockey player

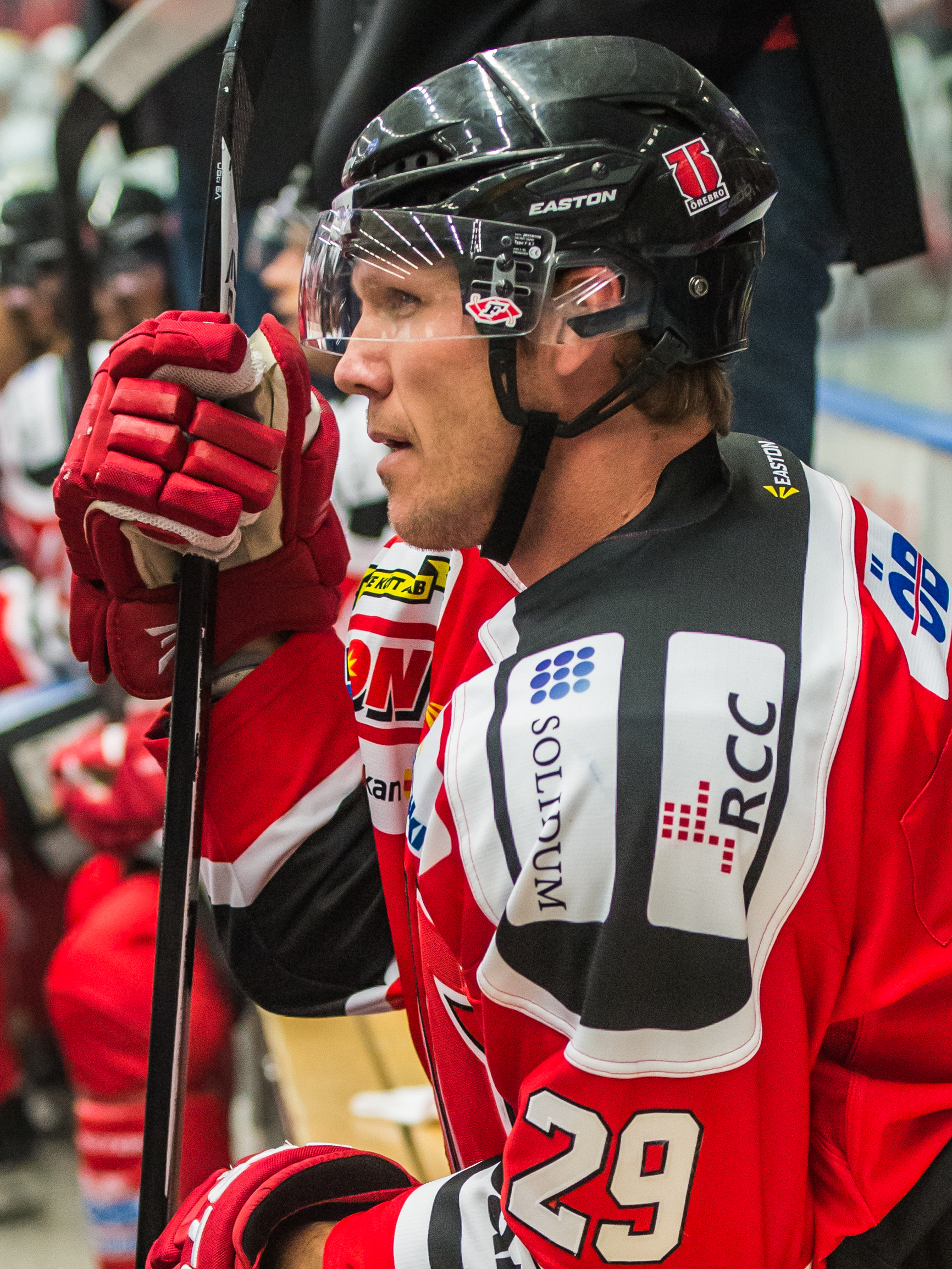
- Born: July 2, 1974 (age 51); Nordmaling, SWE
- Height: 6 ft 2 in (188 cm)
- Weight: 216 lb (98 kg; 15 st 6 lb)
- Position: Defence
- Shot: Left
- SHL team Former teams: Örebro Hockey; Linköpings HC (Elitserien); Straubing Tigers (DEL); Skellefteå AIK (Elitserien)
- Playing career: 1992/1993–2014

Christoffer Norgren (born July 2, 1974) is a Swedish former professional ice hockey player who last played in the Örebro HK team in Swedish Hockey League.

== Career statistics ==
			Regular season					Playoffs
Season	Team	League	GP	G	A	Pts	PIM	GP	G	A	Pts	PIM
1991–92	IF Björklöven J20	Juniorallsvenskan	—	—	—	—	—	—	—	—	—	—
1992–93	IF Björklöven J20	Juniorserien	—	—	—	—	—	—	—	—	—	—
1992–93	IF Björklöven	Division 1	2	0	0	0	0	—	—	—	—	—
1993–94	Tegs SK Hockey	Division 2	20	6	8	14	9	—	—	—	—	—
1994–95	Tegs SK Hockey	Division 2	18	3	2	5	10	—	—	—	—	—
1995–96	Tegs SK Hockey	Division 2	27	7	5	12	24	—	—	—	—	—
1996–97	Tegs SK Hockey	Division 1	30	5	3	8	30	—	—	—	—	—
1997–98	Husums IF	Division 1	17	0	4	4	30	—	—	—	—	—
1997–98	Västerviks IK	Division 1	11	0	0	0	18	—	—	—	—	—
1998–99	IFK Arboga IK	Division 1	42	5	11	16	54	—	—	—	—	—
1999–00	Mora IK	Allsvenskan	45	2	5	7	24	5	1	1	2	2
2000–01	Linköping HC	Allsvenskan	37	2	6	8	22	8	0	2	2	4
2001–02	Linköping HC	Elitserien	49	0	4	4	65	—	—	—	—	—
2002–03	Bakersfield Condors	WCHL	43	5	11	16	80	—	—	—	—	—
2003–04	Linköping HC	Elitserien	49	3	7	10	81	5	0	0	0	4
2004–05	Linköping HC	Elitserien	46	1	2	3	63	6	0	0	0	27
2005–06	Linköping HC	Elitserien	49	1	4	5	54	13	0	0	0	6
2006–07	Straubing Tigers	DEL	52	3	3	6	86	—	—	—	—	—
2007–08	Skellefteå AIK	Elitserien	54	0	6	6	63	5	0	0	0	4
2008–09	Skellefteå AIK	Elitserien	33	0	1	1	22	11	0	0	0	18
2009–10	Skellefteå AIK	Elitserien	47	0	3	3	36	12	0	0	0	8
2010–11	Örebro HK	HockeyAllsvenskan	27	2	1	3	10	10	0	2	2	31
2011–12	Örebro HK	HockeyAllsvenskan	48	1	5	6	22	9	0	1	1	2
2012–13	Örebro HK	HockeyAllsvenskan	47	2	0	2	20	15	1	1	2	8
2013–14	Örebro HK	SHL	49	1	3	4	24	—	—	—	—	—
2014–15	IFK Arboga IK	Hockeyettan	32	2	12	14	30	10	1	5	6	8
2016–17	IFK Arboga IK	Hockeyettan	1	0	0	0	0	—	—	—	—	—
SHL (Elitserien) totals			376	6	30	36	408	52	0	0	0	67
DEL totals			52	3	3	6	86	—	—	—	—	—
HockeyAllsvenskan totals			122	5	6	11	52	34	1	4	5	41
Division 1 totals			102	10	18	28	132	—	—	—	—	—
