= Extra attacker =

Substitution of goalie for extra player in ice hockey

An extra attacker in ice hockey, ringette, and box lacrosse is a forward or, less commonly, a defenceman who has been substituted in place of the goaltender. The purpose of this substitution is to gain an offensive advantage to score a goal. The removal of the goaltender for an extra attacker is colloquially called pulling the goalie, resulting in an empty net. This article deals chiefly with situations which apply to the sport of ice hockey.

== Ice hockey ==
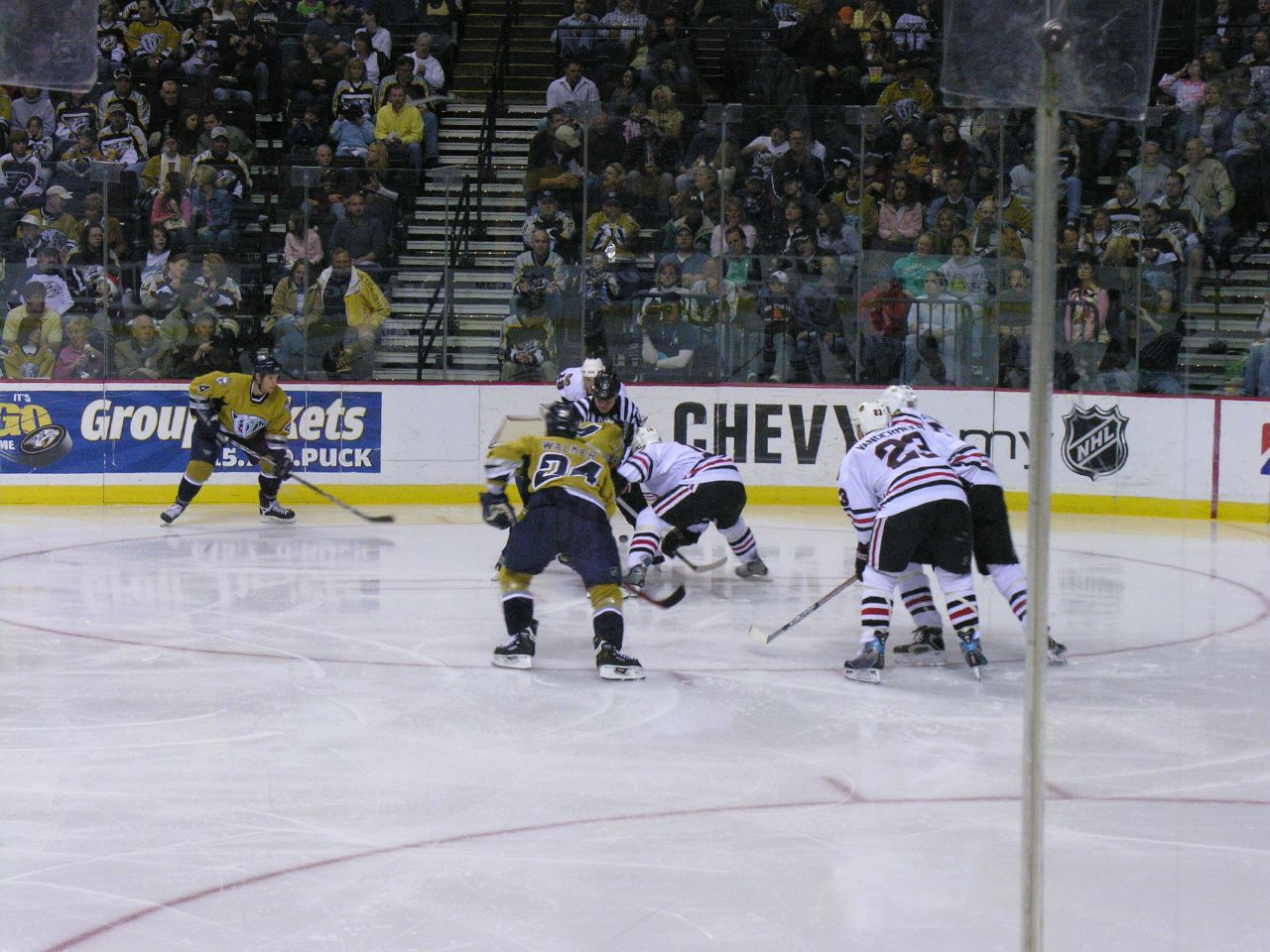
The Chicago Blackhawks playing with an extra attacker at left wing in an April 2006 face-off against the Nashville Predators

The extra attacker is typically utilized in two situations:

- Near the end of the game—typically the last 60 to 90 seconds—when a team is losing by one or two goals (especially when opponent team is short-handed). In this case, the team risks a goal being scored on its empty net. In "do-or-die" situations such as playoff elimination games, a team may pull the goaltender for an extra attacker earlier in the game or when the team is down by more goals.
- During a delayed penalty call. In this case, once the opposing team regains possession of the puck, play will be stopped for the penalty. This means there will be no chance for a shot to be taken by the penalized team rendering the goaltender of little use. On rare occasions (and much to the humiliation of the team which has pulled its goalie), however, the puck can find its way into the empty net (without the penalized team ever gaining possession) as a result of an errant pass or other mishandling of the puck by the team with the man advantage. Hockey rules specify that in this case, the goal is awarded to the player on the penalized team who had last touched the puck and the serving of the penalty begins after the faceoff at centre ice.

The term sixth attacker is also used when both teams are at even strength or when the trailing team is already on a power play before; teams may also pull the goalie when shorthanded by a player, in which case the extra attacker would be a fifth attacker. It is exceptionally rare for a penalized team to do so during five on three situations.

Also, in four-on-four overtime, an extra attacker is added to a team on a power play in the case where another minor penalty is committed against them. This results in a five-on-three. In leagues with a three-on-three overtime, each minor penalty results in an extra attacker for the team on the power play (up to a maximum of five total skaters plus goalie). Penalized players return to the ice when their penalty expires, and the proper on-ice strength (e.g. 4-3, 4-4, or 3-3) is corrected at the first appropriate stoppage.

In leagues like the National Hockey League (NHL) where regular season standings are based on a point system (i.e. two points are awarded for a win, one point for an overtime/shootout loss, and no points for a loss in regulation), a team may be forced to use an extra attacker even when the score is tied near the end of regulation of a game at or near the end of the regular season to avoid being eliminated from playoff contention, division title contention, or even home-ice advantage. Beginning in 1999–2000 season, the league discourages from pulling their goaltender in overtime; if a team does so, and subsequently loses the game when their opponent scores an empty net goal, the losing team is charged with a regulation loss and forfeited the one point in the standings they would otherwise have received for an overtime loss.

Russian and Soviet coaches are known for refusing to pull their goalies when behind late in games, as was the case in the 1980 Winter Olympics medal game between the Soviet Union and the USA.

The extra attacker concept was first utilized in the NHL by Art Ross, coach and general manager of the Toronto Maple Leafs, who picked up the idea from experimental incidents in amateur and minor-league hockey. In a playoff game against the Chicago Black Hawks on March 26, 1931, Ross had goaltender Tiny Thompson go to the bench for a sixth skater in the final minute of play of a tie game. The Maple Leafs did not score with the extra attacker, and lost in overtime, 2-1.

Milt Schmidt was the first NHL coach to pull the goaltender for a delayed penalty on April 16, 1958 while coaching the Boston Bruins against the Montreal Canadiens.

A 2018 model by Aaron Brown and Cliff Asness based on the 2015–16 NHL season suggested that, for a team down one point where losing 2–0 is no worse than losing 1–0, the ideal time to pull the goalie is somewhere between 5 and 6 minutes from the end of the match.

== Handball ==
Taking out the goalkeeper is very common at the higher levels of play in handball, as matches allow an unlimited number of substitutions without requiring any stoppage in play. Score tables will usually signal with the text "Empty Goal" if a team has pulled the goalkeeper.

== See also ==
- Rover (ice hockey)
- Empty net goal
- Goalkeeper (association football)#Playmaking and attack - rare situation in association football in which a goalkeeper becomes an attacking player
