= Christoffer Rifalk =

Swedish ice hockey goaltender

- Born: 6 July 1996 (age 29) Kalix, Sweden
- Height: 188 cm (6 ft 2 in)
- Weight: 85 kg (187 lb; 13 st 5 lb)
- Position: Goaltender
- Catches: Left
- SHL team: Rögle BK
- Playing career: 2018–present

Christoffer Rifalk (born 6 July 1996) is a Swedish professional ice hockey goaltender. He currently plays for Rögle BK of the Swedish Hockey League (SHL). During his first full season with IK Oskarshamn, Rifalk helped the club get promoted to the SHL.
