= Jonas Arntzen =

Norwegian ice hockey player (born 1997)

- Born: 21 November 1997 (age 28) Lillehammer, Norway
- Height: 191 cm (6 ft 3 in)
- Weight: 85 kg (187 lb; 13 st 5 lb)
- Position: Goaltender
- Catches: Right
- SHL team Former teams: Örebro HK; Lillehammer IK; Leksands IF
- National team: Norway
- NHL draft: Undrafted
- Playing career: 2015–present

Jonas Arntzen (born 21 November 1997) is a Norwegian ice hockey player for Örebro HK in the Swedish Hockey League (SHL) and the Norwegian national team.

He represented Norway at the 2021 IIHF World Championship.
