= 2025–26 SHL season =

- League: Swedish Hockey League
- Sport: Ice hockey
- Duration: 13 September 2025 – 14 March 2026; (Regular season); 17 March 2026 – 2 May 2026; (Playoffs)
- TV partner(s): Telia; TV4 Hockey

Regular season
- First place: Skellefteå AIK
- Season MVP: Oscar Lindberg (Skellefteå AIK)
- Top scorer: Oscar Lindberg (Skellefteå AIK)
- Relegated to HockeyAllsvenskan: Leksands IF

Playoffs
- Playoffs MVP: Oscar Lindberg (Skellefteå AIK)
- Finals champions: Skellefteå AIK
- Runners-up: Rögle BK

SHL seasons
- 2024–25 2026–27

The 2025–26 SHL season was the 51st season of the Swedish Hockey League (SHL). The regular season began on 13 September 2025, and concluded on 14 March 2026, where it was followed by the playoffs and the relegation playoffs.

Skellefteå AIK finished top of the regular season standings for the first time in a decade, finishing with 108 points and a 7-point margin over runners-up Frölunda HC, helped in part by top points scorer and most valuable player Oscar Lindberg, and an SHL record 10 shutouts for goaltender Strauss Mann. Skellefteå AIK went on to complete the league and playoff double, defeating Rögle BK 4–1 to win their fifth playoff title, with Lindberg again being the most valuable player – becoming the first player to win the Guldhjälmen and the Stefan Liv Memorial Trophy in the same season since Joakim Lindström did so in 2013–14, and the first player to win the Stefan Liv Memorial Trophy twice.

HV71 won the Play Out for the third successive season, defeating Leksands IF in four consecutive games, relegating the latter after seven seasons in the SHL.

== Teams ==
The league consisted of 14 teams; Djurgårdens IF returned to the SHL after three seasons in the HockeyAllsvenskan, where they won the 2024–25 title.

Modo Hockey were relegated to the HockeyAllsvenskan at the end of the previous season, after two seasons in the SHL.

SHL team map

Team	City	Arena	Capacity
Brynäs IF	Gävle	Monitor ERP Arena	7,909
Djurgårdens IF	Stockholm	Hovet	8,094
Färjestad BK	Karlstad	Löfbergs Arena	8,647
Frölunda HC	Gothenburg	Scandinavium	12,044
HV71	Jönköping	Husqvarna Garden	7,000
Leksands IF	Leksand	Tegera Arena	7,650
Linköping HC	Linköping	Saab Arena	8,500
Luleå HF	Luleå	Coop Norrbotten Arena	6,300
Malmö Redhawks	Malmö	Malmö Arena	13,000
Örebro HK	Örebro	Behrn Arena	5,150
Rögle BK	Ängelholm	Catena Arena	5,150
Skellefteå AIK	Skellefteå	Skellefteå Kraft Arena	6,001
Timrå IK	Timrå	SCA Arena	6,000
Växjö Lakers	Växjö	Vida Arena	5,700

== Regular season ==
Each team played 52 games, playing each of the other thirteen teams four times: twice on home ice, and twice away from home. Points were awarded for each game, where three points were awarded for winning in regulation time, two points for winning in overtime or shootout, one point for losing in overtime or shootout, and zero points for losing in regulation time. At the end of the regular season, the team that finished with the most points was crowned the league champion.

As Skellefteå AIK won both the league and the playoffs, and Frölunda HC won the 2025–26 Champions Hockey League, the two next highest-ranked teams – Växjö Lakers and Rögle BK – also qualified for the 2026–27 Champions Hockey League.

=== Standings ===
Pos	Team	Pld	W	OTW	OTL	L	GF	GA	GD	Pts	Qualification
1	Skellefteå AIK (C)	52	30	6	6	10	182	121	+61	108	Qualification to Quarter-finals and Champions Hockey League (Note: Frölunda HC qualified for the 2026–27 Champions Hockey League as the 2025–26 winners. As Skellefteå AIK won both the league and the playoffs, Rögle BK qualified as the highest-placed team not already qualified.)
2	Frölunda HC	52	30	4	3	15	161	106	+55	101	Qualification to Quarter-finals and Champions Hockey League
3	Växjö Lakers	52	26	6	4	16	150	136	+14	94	Qualification to Quarter-finals and Champions Hockey League
4	Rögle BK	52	25	5	8	14	155	123	+32	93	Qualification to Quarter-finals and Champions Hockey League
5	Färjestad BK	52	21	6	5	20	145	131	+14	80	Qualification to Quarter-finals
6	Brynäs IF	52	19	8	5	20	154	143	+11	78	Qualification to Quarter-finals
7	Luleå HF	52	21	5	4	22	139	134	+5	77	Qualification to Eighth-finals
8	Malmö Redhawks	52	21	6	2	23	143	154	−11	77	Qualification to Eighth-finals
9	Djurgårdens IF	52	20	5	3	24	136	164	−28	73	Qualification to Eighth-finals
10	Örebro HK	52	17	4	7	24	139	158	−19	66	Qualification to Eighth-finals
11	Linköping HC	52	17	4	5	26	119	148	−29	64	
12	Timrå IK	52	17	4	4	27	127	148	−21	63	
13	HV71	52	15	4	6	27	136	172	−36	59	Qualification to Play Out
14	Leksands IF (R)	52	16	2	7	27	112	160	−48	59	Qualification to Play Out

Source: SHL.se
Rules for classification: 1) Points; 2) Goal difference; 3) Number of goals scored
(C) Champion; (R) Relegated

=== Statistics ===
==== Scoring leaders ====
The following shows the top ten players who led the league in points, at the conclusion of the regular season. If two or more skaters are tied (i.e. same number of points, goals and played games), all of the tied skaters are shown.

Player	Team	GP	G	A	Pts	+/–	PIM
(Sweden) Oscar Lindberg	Skellefteå AIK	52	30	37	67	+17	52
(Sweden) Rickard Hugg	Skellefteå AIK	52	20	36	56	+13	12
(Sweden) Jonathan Dahlén	Timrå IK	50	30	25	55	+9	16
(Sweden) Patrik Karlkvist	Örebro HK	52	15	35	50	0	14
(Sweden) Lucas Elvenes	Växjö Lakers	51	12	38	50	+3	14
(Sweden) Robin Kovacs	Linköping HC	50	23	24	47	+2	49
(Sweden) Jonathan Pudas	Skellefteå AIK	48	16	31	47	+11	36
(Canada) Jonathan Ang	HV71	52	21	25	46	–10	38
(Sweden) Emil Pettersson	Timrå IK	51	15	31	46	+8	22
(Sweden) Viktor Lodin	Färjestad BK	49	12	34	46	–1	44

==== Leading goaltenders ====
The following shows the top ten goaltenders who led the league in goals against average, provided that they had played at least 40% of their team's minutes, at the conclusion of the regular season.

Player	Team	GP	TOI	W	L	GA	SO	Sv%	GAA
(Norway) Tobias Normann	Frölunda HC	24	1425:53	14	10	40	3	92.34	1.68
(United States) Strauss Mann	Skellefteå AIK	42	2483:18	31	10	80	10	91.35	1.93
(Sweden) Lars Johansson	Frölunda HC	28	1693:56	20	8	60	1	90.84	2.13
(Sweden) Adam Åhman	Växjö Lakers	32	1896:40	22	10	69	3	90.71	2.18
(Finland) Emil Larmi	Färjestad BK	37	1997:19	17	17	77	2	89.92	2.31
(Sweden) Arvid Holm	Rögle BK	35	2055:47	19	15	80	4	89.16	2.33
(Sweden) Matteus Ward	Luleå HF	33	1934:19	20	12	76	2	89.28	2.36
(Italy) Damian Clara	Brynäs IF	33	1929:28	17	15	81	2	88.73	2.52
(Sweden) Jacob Johansson	Timrå IK	33	1881:20	14	16	80	3	89.06	2.55
(Sweden) Jhonas Enroth	Örebro HK	31	1833:51	13	17	81	2	89.05	2.65

== Playoffs ==
Ten teams qualified for the playoffs: the top six teams in the regular season had a bye to the quarterfinals, while teams ranked seventh to tenth met each other (7 versus 10, 8 versus 9) in a preliminary playoff round.

=== Format ===
In the first round, the 7th-ranked team met the 10th-ranked team and the 8th-ranked team met the 9th-ranked team for a place in the second round. In the second round, the top-ranked team met the lowest-ranked winner of the first round, the second-ranked team faced the other winner of the first round, the third-ranked team faced the sixth-ranked team, and the fourth-ranked team faced the fifth-ranked team. In the third round, the highest remaining seed was matched against the lowest remaining seed. In each round the higher-seeded team was awarded home advantage. The meetings in the first round were played as a best-of-three playoff series, and in the later rounds as a best-of-seven playoff series. In the eighth-finals, the higher-seeded teams played at home for game 2 (plus 3 if necessary) while the lower-seeded teams played at home for game 1. In the later rounds, the higher-seeded teams were at home for games 1 and 3 (plus 5 and 7 if necessary) while the lower-seeded teams were at home for games 2 and 4 (plus 6 if necessary).

=== Playoff bracket ===
Eighth-finals; Swedish: Åttondelsfinal
7	Luleå HF	2
10	Örebro HK	1
8	Malmö Redhawks	2
9	Djurgårdens IF	1

Quarter-finals; Swedish: Kvartsfinal
1	Skellefteå AIK	4
8	Malmö Redhawks	1
2	Frölunda HC	2
7	Luleå HF	4
3	Växjö Lakers	4
6	Brynäs IF	1
4	Rögle BK	4
5	Färjestad BK	3

Semi-finals
1	Skellefteå AIK	4
7	Luleå HF	1
(Pairings were re-seeded after the first and second round)
3	Växjö Lakers	1
4	Rögle BK	4

Finals
1	Skellefteå AIK	4
4	Rögle BK	1

=== Eighth-finals ===
==== (7) Luleå HF vs. (10) Örebro HK ====
17 March	Örebro HK	2–6	Luleå HF	Behrn Arena	Recap
No scoring		First period	No scoring
Patrik Puistola (1; PPG) – 2:41; Kalle Kossila (1) – 15:55		Second period	6:08 – Eetu Koivistoinen (1); 11:51 – Pontus Andreasson (1); 12:43 – Mathias Bromé (1); 13:58 – Isac Hedqvist (1)
No scoring		Third period	17:21 – Erik Gustafsson (1); 17:50 – Anton Levtchi (1; ENG)
Jhonas Enroth (30 shots / 25 saves)		Goalie stats	Matteus Ward (34 shots / 32 saves)

19 March	Luleå HF	1–3	Örebro HK	Coop Norrbotten Arena	Recap
No scoring		First period	No scoring
No scoring		Second period	15:58 – Kalle Kossila (2; PPG)
Anton Levtchi (2) – 1:57		Third period	6:57 – Kalle Miketinac (1); 12:10 – Kalle Miketinac (2)
Matteus Ward (26 shots / 23 saves)		Goalie stats	Jhonas Enroth (18 shots / 17 saves)

21 March	Luleå HF	4–2	Örebro HK	Coop Norrbotten Arena	Recap
Anton Levtchi (3) – 6:45; Linus Omark (1; PPG) – 17:43; Ben Tardif (1) – 18:35		First period	2:59 – Kalle Kossila (3); 18:09 – Kalle Kossila (4)
No scoring		Second period	No scoring
Ben Tardif (2) – 3:58		Third period	No scoring
Matteus Ward (26 shots / 24 saves)		Goalie stats	Jhonas Enroth (25 shots / 21 saves)

Luleå HF win series 2–1

==== (8) Malmö Redhawks vs. (9) Djurgårdens IF ====
17 March	Djurgårdens IF	3–2	OT	Malmö Redhawks	Hovet	Recap
No scoring		First period		18:37 – Joona Ikonen (1)
Colby Sissons (1; PPG) – 6:21		Second period		16:26 – Carl Persson (1; PPG)
Viggo Björck (1) – 0:52		Third period		No scoring
Anton Frondell (1; PPG) – 9:08		First overtime period		No scoring
Daniel Marmenlind (32 shots / 30 saves)		Goalie stats		Oskar Blomgren (33 shots / 30 saves)

19 March	Malmö Redhawks	2–1	Djurgårdens IF	Malmö Arena	Recap
Filip Björkman (1) – 2:28		First period	No scoring
No scoring		Second period	No scoring
William von Barnekow (1) – 15:20		Third period	9:01 – Jacob Josefson (1)
Oskar Blomgren (18 shots / 17 saves)		Goalie stats	Magnus Hellberg (26 shots / 24 saves)

21 March	Malmö Redhawks	3–1	Djurgårdens IF	Malmö Arena	Recap
No scoring		First period	No scoring
William von Barnekow (2) – 7:55		Second period	No scoring
Axel Sundberg (1; PPG) – 12:03; Joona Ikonen (2; ENG) – 17:08		Third period	19:49 – Ludvig Rensfeldt (1; EA)
Oskar Blomgren (18 shots / 17 saves)		Goalie stats	Magnus Hellberg (26 shots / 24 saves)

Malmö Redhawks win series 2–1

=== Quarter-finals ===
==== (1) Skellefteå AIK vs. (8) Malmö Redhawks ====
23 March	Skellefteå AIK	4–1	Malmö Redhawks	Skellefteå Kraft Arena	Recap
No scoring		First period	No scoring
Jonathan Johnson (1) – 6:30; Mikkel Aagaard (1; PPG) – 18:21		Second period	6:15 – Lauri Pajuniemi (1)
Emil Djuse (1) – 11:39; Jonathan Johnson (2; ENG) – 18:36		Third period	No scoring
Linus Söderström (17 shots / 16 saves)		Goalie stats	Oskar Blomgren (37 shots / 34 saves)

25 March	Skellefteå AIK	3–2	Malmö Redhawks	Skellefteå Kraft Arena	Recap
No scoring		First period	No scoring
No scoring		Second period	15:12 – Petter Vesterheim (1); 18:39 – Linus Öberg (1)
Oscar Lindberg (1) – 1:34; Viktor Grahn (1) – 15:05; Lars Bryggman (1) – 19:49		Third period	No scoring
Strauss Mann (15 shots / 13 saves)		Goalie stats	Oskar Blomgren (40 shots / 37 saves)

27 March	Malmö Redhawks	2–4	Skellefteå AIK	Malmö Arena	Recap
Linus Öberg (2) – 9:13		First period	No scoring
No scoring		Second period	13:00 – Mikkel Aagaard (2); 19:29 – Jonathan Pudas (1)
Fredrik Händemark (1; PPG/EA) – 17:33		Third period	16:38 – Pontus Johansson (1); 18:23 – Rickard Hugg (1; ENG)
Oskar Blomgren (29 shots / 26 saves)		Goalie stats	Linus Söderström (31 shots / 29 saves)

29 March	Malmö Redhawks	2–1	OT	Skellefteå AIK	Malmö Arena	Recap
Robin Salo (1) – 18:07		First period		No scoring
No scoring		Second period		13:39 – Oskar Vuollet (1)
No scoring		Third period		No scoring
Topi Niemelä (1; PPG) – 7:33		First overtime period		No scoring
Marek Langhamer (39 shots / 38 saves)		Goalie stats		Strauss Mann (15 shots / 13 saves)

31 March	Skellefteå AIK	4–0	Malmö Redhawks	Skellefteå Kraft Arena	Recap
Victor Stjernborg (1) – 4:55; Oliver Okuliar (1) – 5:47		First period	No scoring
No scoring		Second period	No scoring
Pontus Johansson (2; PPG) – 8:57; Oscar Lindberg (2; ENG) – 13:04		Third period	No scoring
Linus Söderström (12 shots / 12 saves)		Goalie stats	Marek Langhamer (44 shots / 41 saves)

Skellefteå AIK win series 4–1

==== (2) Frölunda HC vs. (7) Luleå HF ====
Game four of the series was the second-longest SHL playoff match at the time, with Mathias Bromé's winner coming 2:31 before the end of the third overtime period.

23 March	Frölunda HC	2–3	OT	Luleå HF	Scandinavium	Recap
Filip Cederqvist (1; PPG) – 13:19		First period		8:20 – Eetu Koivistoinen (2)
No scoring		Second period		14:07 – Isac Hedqvist (2)
Noah Dower Nilsson (1) – 3:01		Third period		No scoring
No scoring		First overtime period		7:05 – Anton Levtchi (4; PPG)
Tobias Normann (24 shots / 21 saves)		Goalie stats		Matteus Ward (30 shots / 28 saves)

25 March	Frölunda HC	7–0	Luleå HF	Scandinavium	Recap
Max Friberg (1) – 12:18; Filip Cederqvist (2; PPG) – 15:40		First period	No scoring
Max Friberg (2) – 6:13; Filip Cederqvist (3) – 13:08		Second period	No scoring
Jere Innala (1) – 9:27; Theodor Niederbach (1; PPG) – 12:17; Arttu Ruotsalainen (1; PPG) – 14:39		Third period	No scoring
Tobias Normann (14 shots / 14 saves)		Goalie stats	Matteus Ward (10 shots / 7 saves); Joel Lassinantti (16 shots / 12 saves)

27 March	Luleå HF	2–1	OT	Frölunda HC	Coop Norrbotten Arena	Recap
No scoring		First period		No scoring
No scoring		Second period		No scoring
Isac Hedqvist (3) – 17:04		Third period		16:25 – Noah Dower Nilsson (2; PPG)
Mathias Bromé (2; PPG) – 10:24		First overtime period		No scoring
Matteus Ward (31 shots / 30 saves)		Goalie stats		Tobias Normann (19 shots / 17 saves)

29 March	Luleå HF	4–3	3OT	Frölunda HC	Coop Norrbotten Arena	Recap
No scoring		First period		6:25 – Jacob Peterson (1); 17:34 – Jere Innala (2)
Eetu Koivistoinen (3) – 1:37; Anton Levtchi (5) – 14:37		Second period		10:43 – Nicklas Lasu (1)
Eetu Koivistoinen (4) – 6:38		Third period		No scoring
Mathias Bromé (3) – 17:29		Third overtime period		No scoring
Matteus Ward (40 shots / 37 saves)		Goalie stats		Lars Johansson (41 shots / 37 saves)

31 March	Frölunda HC	2–1	Luleå HF	Scandinavium	Recap
No scoring		First period	No scoring
Dominik Egli (1) – 18:27		Second period	No scoring
Tom Nilsson (1) – 4:33		Third period	15:34 – Brendan Shinnimin (1)
Tobias Normann (10 shots / 9 saves)		Goalie stats	Matteus Ward (39 shots / 37 saves)

2 April	Luleå HF	1–0	Frölunda HC	Coop Norrbotten Arena	Recap
No scoring		First period	No scoring
No scoring		Second period	No scoring
Anton Levtchi (6; PPG) – 0:36		Third period	No scoring
Matteus Ward (26 shots / 26 saves)		Goalie stats	Tobias Normann (22 shots / 21 saves)

Luleå HF win series 4–2

==== (3) Växjö Lakers vs. (6) Brynäs IF ====
24 March	Växjö Lakers	6–2	Brynäs IF	Vida Arena	Recap
Karl Henriksson (1) – 7:19		First period	No scoring
No scoring		Second period	19:59 – Johan Larsson (1; PPG)
Reid Gardiner (1; PPG) – 5:17; Morgan Anderberg (1; PPG) – 7:45; Lucas Elvenes (1) – 8:34; Dennis Rasmussen (1) – 12:38; Hugo Gustafsson (1) – 12:53		Third period	15:32 – Johannes Kinnvall (1; PPG)
Adam Åhman (21 shots / 19 saves)		Goalie stats	Erik Källgren (20 shots / 14 saves)

26 March	Växjö Lakers	6–4	Brynäs IF	Vida Arena	Recap
Félix Robert (1) – 16:17		First period	3:40 – Axel Jonsson-Fjällby (1); 8:55 – Anton Rödin (1)
Manuel Ågren (1) – 0:25; Leo Sahlin Wallenius (1) – 11:34		Second period	16:20 – Oskar Lindblom (1)
Dennis Rasmussen (2) – 0:37; Kalle Kratz (1) – 2:38; Manuel Ågren (2; ENG) – 18:33		Third period	6:59 – Jakob Silfverberg (1; PPG)
Adam Åhman (26 shots / 22 saves)		Goalie stats	Erik Källgren (16 shots / 11 saves)

28 March	Brynäs IF	3–2	OT	Växjö Lakers	Monitor ERP Arena	Recap
No scoring		First period		No scoring
No scoring		Second period		No scoring
Mattias Norlinder (1) – 1:54; Bobby Trivigno (1) – 14:23		Third period		9:39 – Lucas Elvenes (2); 19:56 – Reid Gardiner (2; EA)
Jakob Silfverberg (2) – 8:20		First overtime period		No scoring
Damian Clara (20 shots / 18 saves)		Goalie stats		Adam Åhman (33 shots / 30 saves)

30 March	Brynäs IF	2–3	Växjö Lakers	Monitor ERP Arena	Recap
Johan Larsson (2) – 19:12		First period	15:18 – Dylan McLaughlin (1; PPG)
No scoring		Second period	4:03 – Eemeli Suomi (1)
Jakob Silfverberg (3; PPG) – 8:49		Third period	17:15 – Brogan Rafferty (1; PPG)
Damian Clara (17 shots / 14 saves)		Goalie stats	Adam Åhman (32 shots / 30 saves)

1 April	Växjö Lakers	2–1	Brynäs IF	Vida Arena	Recap
Reid Gardiner (3) – 10:48		First period	No scoring
No scoring		Second period	No scoring
Hugo Gustafsson (2; SHG) – 5:15		Third period	11:06 – Oskar Lindblom (2)
Adam Åhman (32 shots / 31 saves)		Goalie stats	Erik Källgren (13 shots / 11 saves)

Växjö Lakers win series 4–1

==== (4) Rögle BK vs. (5) Färjestad BK ====
In game two, Färjestad BK became the first team to win an SHL playoff game having trailed 0–5 during it. Rögle BK became the first team to win a Swedish playoff series after trailing 0–3 in games; their head coach Dan Tangnes had previously achieved this feat in the Swiss National League with EV Zug in 2021–22.

24 March	Rögle BK	1–2	Färjestad BK	Catena Arena	Recap
No scoring		First period	No scoring
No scoring		Second period	5:02 – Linus Johansson (1)
Daniel Zaar (1) – 8:35		Third period	3:32 – Axel Bergkvist (1)
Christoffer Rifalk (20 shots / 18 saves)		Goalie stats	Melker Thelin (27 shots / 26 saves)

26 March	Rögle BK	5–6	OT	Färjestad BK	Catena Arena	Recap
Dennis Everberg (1) – 3:00; Calle Själin (1) – 12:44; Isac Solberg (1) – 16:10; Dennis Everberg (2) – 16:51; Calle Själin (2; PPG) – 17:55		First period		18:26 – Viktor Lodin (1)
No scoring		Second period		5:47 – David Tomášek (1); 7:38 – David Tomášek (2; PS)
No scoring		Third period		3:32 – Emil Alba (1); 7:32 – Marián Studenič (1)
No scoring		First overtime period		4:35 – David Tomášek (3; PPG)
Christoffer Rifalk (26 shots / 20 saves)		Goalie stats		Melker Thelin (13 shots / 9 saves); Emil Larmi (17 shots / 16 saves)

28 March	Färjestad BK	2–0	Rögle BK	Löfbergs Arena	Recap
No scoring		First period	No scoring
Oskar Steen (1; PPG) – 6:10; David Tomášek (4) – 12:34		Second period	No scoring
No scoring		Third period	No scoring
Emil Larmi (24 shots / 24 saves)		Goalie stats	Arvid Holm (15 shots / 13 saves)

30 March	Färjestad BK	1–2	Rögle BK	Löfbergs Arena	Recap
No scoring		First period	No scoring
Lucas Forsell (1) – 11:21		Second period	12:27 – Paul LaDue (1)
No scoring		Third period	11:43 – Linus Sandin (1; PPG)
Emil Larmi (34 shots / 32 saves)		Goalie stats	Arvid Holm (24 shots / 23 saves)

1 April	Rögle BK	7–2	Färjestad BK	Catena Arena	Recap
Mark Friedman (1) – 4:49; Daniel Zaar (2) – 17:42		First period	No scoring
Filip Johansson (1) – 17:14		Second period	9:43 – Oskar Steen (2); 19:53 – Per Åslund (1)
Daniel Zaar (3; PPG) – 3:46; Filip Johansson (2; PPG) – 11:58; Anton Bengtsson (1; SHG/ENG) – 14:03; Paul LaDue (2; PPG) – 19:22		Third period	No scoring
Arvid Holm (27 shots / 25 saves)		Goalie stats	Emil Larmi (27 shots / 21 saves)

3 April	Färjestad BK	2–3	Rögle BK	Löfbergs Arena	Recap
No scoring		First period	No scoring
No scoring		Second period	1:00 – Felix Nilsson (1); 3:56 – Albin Sundsvik (1); 6:49 – Daniel Zaar (4)
Radim Zohorna (1) – 1:07; Viktor Lodin (2) – 3:51		Third period	No scoring
Melker Thelin (10 shots / 7 saves); Emil Larmi (15 shots / 15 saves)		Goalie stats	Arvid Holm (27 shots / 25 saves)

5 April	Rögle BK	4–1	Färjestad BK	Catena Arena	Recap
Fredrik Olofsson (1) – 10:10; Filip Johansson (3) – 16:12		First period	14:32 – David Tomášek (5)
Paul LaDue (3) – 4:16		Second period	No scoring
Linus Sandin (2; ENG) – 18:44		Third period	No scoring
Arvid Holm (35 shots / 34 saves)		Goalie stats	Emil Larmi (14 shots / 11 saves); Melker Thelin (3 shots / 3 saves)

Rögle BK win series 4–3

=== Semi-finals ===
==== (1) Skellefteå AIK vs. (7) Luleå HF ====
Game one of the series became the first quadruple overtime game in SHL playoff history, surpassing the previous longest game of 119:16 between Leksands IF and Färjestad BK from March 1997. The game eventually ended after 122:18, with Andreas Johnsson's winning goal for Skellefteå AIK.

7 April	Skellefteå AIK	4–3	4OT	Luleå HF	Skellefteå Kraft Arena	Recap
Lars Bryggman (2) – 2:15		First period		8:41 – Brendan Shinnimin (2)
Pontus Johansson (3) – 13:58		Second period		No scoring
Oscar Lindberg (3; PPG) – 0:18		Third period		5:49 – Oscar Engsund (1); 10:42 – Frédéric Allard (1; PPG)
Andreas Johnsson (2) – 2:18		Fourth overtime period		No scoring
Strauss Mann (38 shots / 35 saves)		Goalie stats		Matteus Ward (53 shots / 49 saves)

9 April	Skellefteå AIK	5–0	Luleå HF	Skellefteå Kraft Arena	Recap
Lars Bryggman (3) – 3:46		First period	No scoring
Lars Bryggman (4; PPG) – 16:26; Andreas Johnsson (3) – 19:56		Second period	No scoring
Oscar Lindberg (4; PPG) – 7:26; Jonathan Johnson (2; PPG) – 12:45		Third period	No scoring
Linus Söderström (17 shots / 17 saves)		Goalie stats	Matteus Ward (20 shots / 16 saves); Joel Lassinantti (10 shots / 9 saves)

11 April	Luleå HF	1–3	Skellefteå AIK	Coop Norrbotten Arena	Recap
Isac Hedqvist (4) – 3:46		First period	19:23 – Lars Bryggman (5)
No scoring		Second period	15:17 – Pontus Johansson (4); 17:39 – Emil Djuse (2)
No scoring		Third period	No scoring
Matteus Ward (19 shots / 16 saves)		Goalie stats	Strauss Mann (23 shots / 22 saves)

13 April	Luleå HF	3–2	Skellefteå AIK	Coop Norrbotten Arena	Recap
Brendan Shinnimin (3; PPG) – 11:35		First period	No scoring
Jesper Sellgren (1) – 18:33		Second period	14:05 – Arvid Lundberg (1)
Brendan Shinnimin (4) – 0:40		Third period	2:24 – Oskar Vuollet (2)
Matteus Ward (24 shots / 22 saves)		Goalie stats	Linus Söderström (23 shots / 20 saves)

15 April	Skellefteå AIK	2–1	Luleå HF	Skellefteå Kraft Arena	Recap
Emil Djuse (3) – 8:48		First period	No scoring
Oliver Okuliar (2; PPG) – 1:58		Second period	13:24 – Brian O'Neill (1; PPG)
No scoring		Third period	No scoring
Strauss Mann (18 shots / 17 saves)		Goalie stats	Matteus Ward (25 shots / 23 saves)

Skellefteå AIK win series 4–1

==== (2) Växjö Lakers vs. (4) Rögle BK ====
8 April	Växjö Lakers	3–5	Rögle BK	Vida Arena	Recap
No scoring		First period	No scoring
Erik Andersson (1) – 1:12; Eemeli Suomi (2) – 7:06; Brian Cooper (1) – 10:00		Second period	13:11 – Luboš Horký (1); 15:26 – Daniel Zaar (5); 18:41 – Karson Kuhlman (1)
No scoring		Third period	6:21 – Anton Bengtsson (2); 19:41 – Karson Kuhlman (2; ENG)
Adam Åhman (23 shots / 19 saves)		Goalie stats	Arvid Holm (20 shots / 17 saves)

10 April	Växjö Lakers	0–6	Rögle BK	Vida Arena	Recap
No scoring		First period	19:12 – Albin Sundsvik (2)
No scoring		Second period	9:54 – Albin Sundsvik (3); 13:51 – Josh Dickinson (1)
No scoring		Third period	1:39 – Albin Sundsvik (4); 11:37 – Filip Johansson (4); 16:30 – Linus Sandin (3; PPG)
Adam Åhman (12 shots / 9 saves); Ludvig Persson (12 shots / 9 saves)		Goalie stats	Arvid Holm (16 shots / 16 saves)

12 April	Rögle BK	2–4	Växjö Lakers	Catena Arena	Recap
Linus Sandin (4) – 10:16		First period	No scoring
No scoring		Second period	16:24 – Karl Henriksson (2)
Albin Sundsvik (5) – 4:43		Third period	6:20 – Leo Sahlin Wallenius (2); 11:52 – Brogan Rafferty (2); 18:43 – Hugo Gustafsson (3; ENG)
Arvid Holm (21 shots / 18 saves)		Goalie stats	Adam Åhman (20 shots / 18 saves)

14 April	Rögle BK	4–1	Växjö Lakers	Catena Arena	Recap
Felix Nilsson (2; PPG) – 8:57; Karson Kuhlman (3) – 9:51; Linus Sandin (5) – 10:13		First period	No scoring
Mattias Göransson (1) – 7:54		Second period	No scoring
No scoring		Third period	14:12 – Reid Gardiner (4; PPG)
Arvid Holm (29 shots / 28 saves)		Goalie stats	Adam Åhman (0 shots / 0 saves); Ludvig Persson (23 shots / 19 saves)

16 April	Växjö Lakers	2–3	Rögle BK	Vida Arena	Recap
Eemeli Suomi (3; SHG) – 9:44		First period	1:57 – Anton Bengtsson (3; PPG); 7:28 – Fredrik Olofsson (2)
Dennis Rasmussen (3; PPG) – 18:15		Second period	No scoring
No scoring		Third period	3:18 – Fredrik Olofsson (3)
Ludvig Persson (21 shots / 18 saves)		Goalie stats	Arvid Holm (12 shots / 10 saves)

Rögle BK win series 4–1

=== Finals ===
==== (1) Skellefteå AIK vs. (4) Rögle BK ====
23 April	Skellefteå AIK	4–1	Rögle BK	Skellefteå Kraft Arena	Recap
Rickard Hugg (2) – 18:50		First period	No scoring
Oliver Okuliar (3; PPG) – 18:49		Second period	0:54 – Leon Bristedt (1; PPG)
Pär Lindholm (1) – 17:14; Victor Stjernborg (2; ENG) – 18:52		Third period	No scoring
Linus Söderström (13 shots / 12 saves)		Goalie stats	Arvid Holm (34 shots / 31 saves)

25 April	Skellefteå AIK	5–1	Rögle BK	Skellefteå Kraft Arena	Recap
Victor Stjernborg (3) – 1:49; Victor Stjernborg (4; SHG) – 4:10; Mikkel Aagaard (3) – 6:35; Oliver Okuliar (4) – 18:21		First period	No scoring
No scoring		Second period	1:30 – Josh Dickinson (2; PPG)
Valter Lindberg (1) – 12:24		Third period	No scoring
Strauss Mann (23 shots / 22 saves)		Goalie stats	Arvid Holm (6 shots / 3 saves); Christoffer Rifalk (20 shots / 18 saves)

28 April	Rögle BK	2–1	OT	Skellefteå AIK	Catena Arena	Recap
No scoring		First period		No scoring
Fredrik Olofsson (4; PPG) – 15:58		Second period		No scoring
No scoring		Third period		9:49 – Victor Stjernborg (5)
Anton Bengtsson (4) – 6:16		First overtime period		No scoring
Arvid Holm (20 shots / 19 saves)		Goalie stats		Linus Söderström (28 shots / 26 saves)

30 April	Rögle BK	2–3	Skellefteå AIK	Catena Arena	Recap
Fredrik Olofsson (5) – 18:21		First period	8:30 – Emil Djuse (4); 15:13 – Viktor Grahn (2)
No scoring		Second period	No scoring
Linus Sandin (6; PPG) – 14:26		Third period	3:22 – Pär Lindholm (2)
Arvid Holm (28 shots / 25 saves)		Goalie stats	Strauss Mann (23 shots / 21 saves)

2 May	Skellefteå AIK	7–3	Rögle BK	Skellefteå Kraft Arena	Recap
Oscar Lindberg (5; PPG) – 16:25; Mikkel Aagaard (4; PPG) – 19:57		First period	7:14 – Mark Friedman (2); 9:22 – Luboš Horký (2; PPG)
Viktor Grahn (3) – 3:58; Oliver Okuliar (5) – 8:51		Second period	No scoring
Oliver Okuliar (6) – 10:04; Victor Stjernborg (6; ENG) – 16:55; Rickard Hugg (3; ENG) – 17:50		Third period	11:22 – Mark Friedman (3)
Linus Söderström (21 shots / 18 saves)		Goalie stats	Arvid Holm (30 shots / 25 saves)

Skellefteå AIK win series 4–1

=== Statistics ===
==== Scoring leaders ====
The following players led the league in points, at the conclusion of the playoffs. If two or more skaters are tied (i.e. same number of points, goals and played games), all of the tied skaters are shown.

Player	Team	GP	G	A	Pts	+/–	PIM
(Sweden) Oscar Lindberg	Skellefteå AIK	15	5	9	14	+3	8
(Slovakia) Oliver Okuliar	Skellefteå AIK	15	6	7	13	+12	6
(Sweden) Daniel Zaar	Rögle BK	15	5	7	12	+7	10
(Sweden) Fredrik Olofsson	Rögle BK	17	5	6	11	–3	6
(Sweden) Andreas Johnsson	Skellefteå AIK	15	3	8	11	+14	4
(Sweden) Albin Sundsvik	Rögle BK	17	5	5	10	+8	8
(Sweden) Pontus Johansson	Skellefteå AIK	15	4	6	10	+14	6
(Sweden) Calle Själin	Rögle BK	17	2	8	10	–1	8
(Sweden) Leon Bristedt	Rögle BK	17	1	9	10	+2	14
(Sweden) Linus Sandin	Rögle BK	15	6	3	9	–1	0

==== Leading goaltenders ====
The following shows the top goaltenders who led the league in goals against average, provided that they have played at least 40% of their team's minutes, at the conclusion of the playoffs.

Player	Team	GP	TOI	W	L	GA	SO	Sv%	GAA
(Norway) Tobias Normann	Frölunda HC	5	316:08	2	3	7	1	92.13	1.33
(United States) Strauss Mann	Skellefteå AIK	7	489:51	6	1	12	0	92.26	1.47
(Sweden) Linus Söderström	Skellefteå AIK	8	485:31	6	2	12	2	92.59	1.48
(Sweden) Magnus Hellberg	Djurgårdens IF	2	115:46	0	2	4	0	92.31	2.07
(Sweden) Matteus Ward	Luleå HF	14	912:24	7	7	32	1	92.06	2.10

== Play Out ==
The two bottom-placed teams from the regular season (HV71 and Leksands IF) played a best-of-seven series, with the winner remaining in the SHL and the loser relegated to the second tier, the HockeyAllsvenskan. The higher-seeded team (HV71) held home advantage over the series, playing at home for the first two games, while the lower-seeded team (Leksands IF) were at home for games three and four.

18 March	HV71	2–1	Leksands IF	Husqvarna Garden	Recap
Justin Kloos (1) – 19:45		First period	No scoring
Martin Johnsen (1) – 14:31		Second period	No scoring
No scoring		Third period	0:37 – Michael Lindqvist (1; PPG)
Felix Sandström (23 shots / 22 saves)		Goalie stats	Filip Larsson (28 shots / 26 saves)

20 March	HV71	3–2	Leksands IF	Husqvarna Garden	Recap
Hugo Pettersson (1; PPG) – 17:02; Hugo Pettersson (2) – 19:22		First period	8:53 – Oskar Lang (1)
No scoring		Second period	No scoring
Andreas Borgman (1) – 2:31		Third period	15:07 – Lukas Vejdemo (1)
Felix Sandström (27 shots / 25 saves)		Goalie stats	Filip Larsson (24 shots / 21 saves)

22 March	Leksands IF	1–3	HV71	Tegera Arena	Recap
No scoring		First period	No scoring
No scoring		Second period	18:48 – Jonathan Ang (1)
Lukas Vejdemo (2; PPG) – 16:35		Third period	4:48 – Joona Luoto (1); 19:59 – Joona Luoto (2; ENG)
Filip Larsson (17 shots / 15 saves)		Goalie stats	Felix Sandström (33 shots / 32 saves)

24 March	Leksands IF	1–2	OT	HV71	Tegera Arena	Recap
No scoring		First period		No scoring
Michael Lindqvist (2) – 19:45		Second period		No scoring
No scoring		Third period		19:50 – Hugo Pettersson (3; EA)
No scoring		First overtime period		10:21 – Lukáš Rousek (1)
Filip Larsson (24 shots / 22 saves)		Goalie stats		Felix Sandström (27 shots / 26 saves)

HV71 win series 4–0

== SHL awards ==
Award	Winner(s)
Guldhjälmen	Oscar Lindberg (Skellefteå AIK)
Guldpucken	
Honken Trophy	Magnus Hellberg (Djurgårdens IF)
Håkan Loob Trophy	Jonathan Dahlén (Timrå IK); Oscar Lindberg (Skellefteå AIK)
Rinkens riddare	Rickard Hugg (Skellefteå AIK)
Rookie of the Year	Ivar Stenberg (Frölunda HC)
Salming Trophy	Johannes Kinnvall (Brynäs IF)
Stefan Liv Memorial Trophy	Oscar Lindberg (Skellefteå AIK)
Guldpipan	Linus Öhlund
