= 2026 Karjala Tournament =

2026 NOCCO Hockey Games (Euro Hockey Games)
Tournament details
- Host countries: Finland; Czech Republic
- Cities: Helsinki; Prague
- Venues: 2 (in 2 host cities)
- Dates: 5–8 November 2026
- Teams: 4

Final positions
- Champions: Finland (14th title)
- Runners-up: Sweden
- Third place: Czech Republic
- Fourth place: Switzerland

Tournament statistics
- Games played: 6
- Goals scored: 29 (4.83 per game)
- Attendance: 44,704 (7,451 per game)
- Scoring leader: (Czech Republic) Andrej Šustr (3 points)

Official website
- leijonat.com

The 2026 NOCCO Hockey Games was played between 5 and 8 November 2026. This year's tournament is officially named NOCCO Hockey Games. The Czech Republic, Finland, Sweden and Switzerland played a round-robin for a total of three games per team and six games in total. One game was played in 02 Arena, Prague, Czech Republic (Czechia vs Sweden), all the other games were played in Veikkaus Arena, Helsinki. The tournament is part of 2026–27 Euro Hockey Tour.

== Standings ==
Pos	Team	Pld	W	OTW	OTL	L	GF	GA	GD	Pts
1	Finland	3	2	1	0	0	8	4	+4	8
2	Sweden	3	1	1	0	1	9	7	+2	5
3	Czech Republic	3	1	0	2	0	7	7	0	5
4	Switzerland	3	0	0	0	3	5	11	−6	0

Updated to match(es) played on 8 November 2026. Source: Leijonat.com

== Games ==
All times are local. Helsinki – (Eastern European Time – UTC+2) Prague – (Central European Time – UTC+1)

5 November 2026; 18:30	Czech Republic	2-3 GWS (0-1, 2-0, 0-1) (OT: 0–0) (SO: 0–1)	Sweden	02 Arena, Prague; Attendance: 16,263

Game reference

Dominik Frodl
Goalies
Melker Thelin
Referees:
(Finland) Mikko Kaukokari
(Switzerland) Roland Gerber
Linesmen:
(Czech Republic) Hynek Lederer
(Czech Republic) Josef Špůr

	0-1	07:42 – Filip Roos (Viktor Lodin)
21:10 – Radim Zohorna (Jakub Galvas, Matěj Blümel)	1-1
29:36 – Matěj Stránský (Jiří Smejkal)	2-1
	2-2	55:43 – Jack Berglund (PP)

Shootout
Berglund
10 min
Penalties
4 min
33
Shots
25

5 November 2026; 18:30	Switzerland	1-3 (0-1, 1-1, 0-1)	Finland	Veikkaus Arena, Helsinki; Attendance: 7,087

Game reference

Sandro Aeschlimann
Goalies
Kari Piiroinen
Referees:
(Sweden) Christoffer Holm
(Sweden) Mikael Holm
Linesmen:
(Finland) Niko Jusi
(Finland) Luka Mäkinen

	0-1	12:01 – Roby Järventie
	0-2	30:03 – Axel Rindell (Juho Lammikko, Benjamin Rautiainen)
33:03 – Rodwin Dionicio (Denis Malgin)	1-2
	1-3	59:59 – Roby Järventie (Janne Kuokkanen, Markus Nurmi) (PP)

10 min
Penalties
4 min
24
Shots
26

7 November 2026; 14:30	Sweden	4-2 (1-0, 1-2, 2-0)	Switzerland	Veikkaus Arena, Helsinki; Attendance: 1,880

Game reference

Arvid Holm
Goalies
Ludovic Waeber
Referees:
(Finland) Riku Brander
(Finland) Henri Neva
Linesmen:
(Finland) Joonas Kovanen
(Finland) Tommi Niittylä

10:04 – Victor Stjernborg (Filip Cederqvist, Samuel Fagemo)	1-0
	1-1	21:50 – Dominik Egli (Valentin Nussbaumer, Grégory Hofmann) (PP)
	1-2	26:46 – Denis Malgin (Sven Andrighetto) (SHG)
36:55 – Adam Ollas Mattsson (Albin Sundsvik, Arvid Lundberg)	2-2
46:33 – Filip Eriksson (Jack Berglund, Emil Bemström)	3-2
56:46 – Jacob Larsson (Jesper Frödén, Viktor Lodin) (PP)	4-2

4 min
Penalties
4 min
38
Shots
13

7 November 2026; 18:30	Finland	2-1 GWS (1-0, 0-0, 0-1) (OT: 0–0) (SO: 1-0)	Czech Republic	Veikkaus Arena, Helsinki; Attendance: 8,292

Game reference
Kim Saarinen	Goalies	Jan Bednar	Referees: (Sweden) Christoffer Holm (Sweden) Mikael Holm; Linesmen: (Finland) Niko Jusi (Finland) Luka Mäkinen
01:52 – Juho Lammikko (Benjamin Rautiainen,Juuso Arola) / 1-0; / 1-1 / 58:11 – Andrej Sustr (Jiri Tichacek,Jakub Konecny) (ENG)			Referees: (Sweden) Christoffer Holm (Sweden) Mikael Holm; Linesmen: (Finland) Niko Jusi (Finland) Luka Mäkinen
Innala	Shootout		Referees: (Sweden) Christoffer Holm (Sweden) Mikael Holm; Linesmen: (Finland) Niko Jusi (Finland) Luka Mäkinen
8 min	Penalties	8 min	Referees: (Sweden) Christoffer Holm (Sweden) Mikael Holm; Linesmen: (Finland) Niko Jusi (Finland) Luka Mäkinen
23	Shots	41	Referees: (Sweden) Christoffer Holm (Sweden) Mikael Holm; Linesmen: (Finland) Niko Jusi (Finland) Luka Mäkinen

8 November 2026; 14:30	Czech Republic	4-2 (0-2, 2-0, 2-0)	Switzerland	Veikkaus Arena, Helsinki; Attendance: 986

Game reference

Dominik Frodl
Goalies
Sandro Aeschlimann
Referees:
(Finland) Lassi Heikkinen
(Finland) Kristian Vikman
Linesmen:
(Sweden) Marcus Danielsson
(Sweden) Gustav Jonsson

	0-1	08:10 – Axel Simic (Keanu Derungs,Maximilian Streule)
	0-2	18:03 – Jan Schwendeler (Tino Kessler)
25:17 – Michal Kunc (Radovan Pavlík,Matteo Kočí)	1-2
36:37 – Libor Zábranský (Marian Adámek,Michal Kunc)	2-2
50:53 – Ondřej Kovařčík (Jan Myšák,Andrej Šustr)	3-2
59:57 – Andrej Šustr (ENG)	4-2

6 min
Penalties
4 min
37
Shots
19

8 November 2026; 18:30	Finland	3-2 (1-1, 2-1, 0-0)	Sweden	Veikkaus Arena, Helsinki; Attendance: 10,196

Game reference

Petteri Rimpinen
Goalies
Arvid Holm
Referees:
(Czech Republic) Jiri Ondracek
(Czech Republic) David Sykora
Linesmen:

05:01 – Mikko Lehtonen (Kristian Tanus, Henrik Borgström) (PP)	1-0
	1-1	12:08 – Emil Bemström (Filip Eriksson, Filip Roos)
	1-2	21:13 – Samuel Fagemo (Marcus Sylvegård, Jacob de la Rose)
25:12 – Jere Innala (Mikko Lehtonen, Iiro Pakarinen) (PP)	2-2
32:33 – Iiro Pakarinen (Henrik Borgström, Janne Kuokkanen)	3-2

8 min
Penalties
12 min
23
Shots
28

== Scoring leaders ==
Pos	Player	Country	GP	G	A	Pts	+/−	PIM	POS
1	Andrej Šustr	Czech Republic	3	2	1	3	+4	2	D
2	Roby Järventie	Finland	3	2	0	2	-1	4	F
3	Denis Malgin	Switzerland	2	1	1	2	0	0	F
4	Filip Roos	Sweden	2	1	1	2	-1	0	D
5	Filip Eriksson	Sweden	2	1	1	2	+3	0	F

GP = Games played; G = Goals; A = Assists; Pts = Points; +/− = Plus/minus; PIM = Penalties in minutes; POS = Position
Source: quanthockey

== Goaltending leaders ==
Pos	Player	Country	TOI	GA	GAA	Sv%	SO
1	Sandro Aeschlimann	Switzerland	116:00	6	3.11	90.00	0
2	Dominik Frodl	Czech Republic	125:00	5	2.40	89.40	0
3	Arvid Holm	Sweden	119:00	6	2.52	86.10	0

TOI = Time on ice (minutes:seconds); SA = Shots against; GA = Goals against; GAA = Goals Against Average; Sv% = Save percentage; SO = Shutouts
Source:quanthockey
