= Jakob Johansson (disambiguation) =

Jakob Johansson (born 1990) is a Swedish footballer.

Jakob Johansson may also refer to:

- Jakob Johansson (footballer, born 1998), Danish footballer
- Jakob Johansson (ice hockey) (born 1979), Swedish ice hockey player
- Jacob Johansson (ice hockey, born 1993), a hockey player in the 2016–17 SHL season
