= William von Barnekow =

Swedish ice hockey player

- Born: 12 November 2002 (age 23) Malmö, Sweden
- Height: 6 ft 2 in (188 cm)
- Weight: 190 lb (86 kg; 13 st 8 lb)
- Position: Centre
- Shoots: Left
- SHL team: Malmö Redhawks
- NHL draft: 161st overall, 2021; Buffalo Sabres
- Playing career: 2021–present

William von Barnekow (born 12 November 2002) is a Swedish professional ice hockey forward. He is currently playing with the Malmö Redhawks of the SHL. He was drafted by the Buffalo Sabres in the sixth round, 161st overall, of the 2021 NHL entry draft.

== Career statistics ==
			Regular season					Playoffs
Season	Team	League	GP	G	A	Pts	PIM	GP	G	A	Pts	PIM
2019–20	Malmö Redhawks	J20	15	1	2	3	0	—	—	—	—	—
2020–21	Malmö Redhawks	J20	18	7	14	21	45	—	—	—	—	—
2020–21	Malmö Redhawks	SHL	2	0	0	0	0	2	0	1	1	0
2020–21	Tyringe SoSS	Div.1	26	9	13	22	29	—	—	—	—	—
2021–22	Malmö Redhawks	J20	27	11	20	31	14	—	—	—	—	—
2021–22	Malmö Redhawks	SHL	27	0	0	0	0	—	—	—	—	—
2021–22	Troja-Ljungby	Allsv	8	0	0	0	0	—	—	—	—	—
2022–23	Malmö Redhawks	J20	1	0	1	1	0	—	—	—	—	—
2022–23	Malmö Redhawks	SHL	37	4	2	6	0	—	—	—	—	—
2023–24	Malmö Redhawks	SHL	48	5	7	12	12	—	—	—	—	—
2024–25	Malmö Redhawks	SHL	52	5	5	10	14	8	0	0	0	4
2025–26	Malmö Redhawks	SHL	45	3	5	8	12	8	2	1	3	0
SHL totals			211	17	19	36	38	18	2	2	4	4
