= Janne Kuokkanen =

Finnish ice hockey player (born 1998)

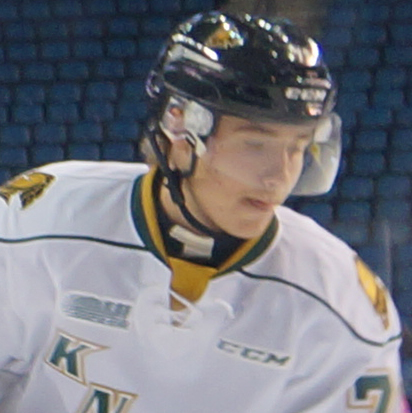
- Kuokkanen with the London Knights in 2016
- Born: 25 May 1998 (age 28) Oulunsalo, Finland
- Height: 6 ft 1 in (185 cm)
- Weight: 187 lb (85 kg; 13 st 5 lb)
- Position: Forward
- Shoots: Left
- SHL team Former teams: Malmö Redhawks; Oulun Kärpät; Carolina Hurricanes; New Jersey Devils; HC Fribourg-Gottéron; Lausanne HC
- National team: Finland
- NHL draft: 43rd overall, 2016; Carolina Hurricanes
- Playing career: 2016–present

Janne Kuokkanen (born 25 May 1998) is a Finnish professional ice hockey player who is a forward for Malmö Redhawks of the Swedish Hockey League (SHL). Kuokkanen was drafted 43rd overall by the Carolina Hurricanes in the 2016 NHL entry draft.

== Playing career ==
Before joining London Knights for the 2016–17 season, Kuokkanen played one game in his native Finland for Oulun Kärpät in the Finnish Liiga. He also played one game for their affiliate team Hokki in the Finnish 2nd level and 47 games for Kärpät in their U20 team. Approaching the post-season in his rookie season in North America with the London Knights of the Ontario Hockey League and having averaged over a point-per-game offensively with 26 goals and 62 points in 60 games, Kuokkanen was signed to a three-year entry-level contract with the Carolina Hurricanes on 24 March 2017. After a second round exit in the post-season with the Knights, Kuokkanen was assigned to join the Hurricanes AHL affiliate, the Charlotte Checkers, during their first round series against the Chicago Wolves. Kuokkanen made his North American professional debut appearing in a single game with the Checkers in their first round defeat.

Kuokkanen started the 2017–18 season with the Hurricanes but after playing four games and garnering no points he was reassigned to the Checkers on 30 October 2017.

During the 2019–20 season, while leading the Charlotte Checkers in scoring with 42 points through 52 games, Kuokkanen was dealt by the Hurricanes at the NHL trade deadline, along with Fredrik Claesson and a conditional 2020 fourth-round pick to the New Jersey Devils in exchange for Sami Vatanen on 24 February 2020. Kuokkanen scored his first NHL goal on 30 January 2021, in a 4–3 shootout loss to the Buffalo Sabres. On 9 August, Kuokkanen was re-signed to a two-year contract by the Devils.

On 13 July 2022, the Devils bought out the final year of Kuokkanen's contract. Leaving the NHL, he was later signed to a one-year contract with Swiss club, HC Fribourg-Gottéron of the National League (NL), on 27 July 2022.

On 18 April, 2023, Kuokkanen signed with the Malmö Redhawks of the Swedish Hockey League (SHL). He led the team in points for the season.

On 3 June, 2024, Kuokkanen signed a two-year contract with the Lausanne HC of the NL alongside Malmö teammate Lauri Pajuniemi. His season was cut short after an injury that required surgery.

On 28 May, 2025, Kuokkanen left the Lausanne HC halfway through his contract, returning to the Malmö Redhawks with a four-year contract alongside teammate Lauri Pajuniemi.

Medal record

Men's ice hockey

Representing Finland

World Championships
Gold medal – first place	2026 Switzerland	

== Career statistics ==
=== Regular season and playoffs ===
			Regular season					Playoffs
Season	Team	League	GP	G	A	Pts	PIM	GP	G	A	Pts	PIM
2014–15	Oulun Kärpät	Jr. A	35	3	12	15	16	—	—	—	—	—
2015–16	Oulun Kärpät	Jr. A	47	22	31	53	53	3	0	1	1	2
2015–16	Oulun Kärpät	Liiga	1	2	0	2	0	—	—	—	—	—
2015–16	Hokki	Mestis	1	1	1	2	2	—	—	—	—	—
2016–17	London Knights	OHL	60	26	36	62	14	14	10	6	16	2
2016–17	Charlotte Checkers	AHL	—	—	—	—	—	1	0	0	0	0
2017–18	Carolina Hurricanes	NHL	4	0	0	0	0	—	—	—	—	—
2017–18	Charlotte Checkers	AHL	60	11	29	40	16	8	3	1	4	2
2018–19	Charlotte Checkers	AHL	48	12	26	38	16	—	—	—	—	—
2018–19	Carolina Hurricanes	NHL	7	0	0	0	4	—	—	—	—	—
2019–20	Charlotte Checkers	AHL	52	12	30	42	16	—	—	—	—	—
2019–20	Binghamton Devils	AHL	4	3	3	6	2	—	—	—	—	—
2019–20	New Jersey Devils	NHL	1	0	0	0	0	—	—	—	—	—
2020–21	Oulun Kärpät	Liiga	16	3	4	7	2	—	—	—	—	—
2020–21	New Jersey Devils	NHL	50	8	17	25	14	—	—	—	—	—
2021–22	New Jersey Devils	NHL	57	6	11	17	10	—	—	—	—	—
2022–23	HC Fribourg-Gottéron	NL	42	10	21	31	12	1	0	0	0	0
2023–24	Malmö Redhawks	SHL	43	18	26	44	12	—	—	—	—	—
2024–25	Lausanne HC	NL	35	6	19	25	22	—	—	—	—	—
2025–26	Malmö Redhawks	SHL	48	13	32	45	51	8	0	3	3	6
Liiga totals			17	5	4	9	2	—	—	—	—	—
NHL totals			119	14	28	42	28	—	—	—	—	—
NL totals			77	16	40	56	34	1	0	0	0	0
SHL totals			91	31	58	89	63	8	0	3	3	6

=== International ===
Year	Team	Event	Result	GP	G	A	Pts	PIM
2014	Finland	U17	4th	6	2	3	5	6
2015	Finland	IH18	4th	5	0	6	6	4
2016	Finland	WJC18	1st place, gold medalist(s)	7	3	4	7	4
2017	Finland	WJC	9th	6	0	1	1	2
2026	Finland	WC	1st place, gold medalist(s)	10	1	2	3	0
Junior totals				24	5	14	19	16
Senior totals				10	1	2	3	0

== Awards and honours ==
Award	Year
AHL
All-Star Game	2019
Calder Cup	2019
