= Lars Bryggman =

Swedish ice hockey player

- Born: January 9, 1993 (age 33) Umeå, Sweden
- Height: 6 ft 4 in (193 cm)
- Weight: 203 lb (92 kg; 14 st 7 lb)
- Position: Winger
- Shoots: Left
- SHL team Former teams: Skellefteå AIK; Luleå HF; Malmö Redhawks; Lahti Pelicans
- Playing career: 2013–present

Lars Bryggman (born January 9, 1993) is a Swedish ice hockey player. He is currently playing with Skellefteå AIK of the Swedish Hockey League (SHL).

== Playing career ==
Bryggman made his SHL debut playing with Luleå HF during the 2013–14 SHL season.

Following three seasons in the Liiga with the Lahti Pelicans, Bryggman returned to the SHL after signing a one-year contract with his original youth club, Skellefteå AIK, for the 2025–26 on 28 April 2025.
