= Rögle BK =

Swedish ice hockey club

- City: Ängelholm
- League: Swedish Hockey League
- Founded: 18 December 1932
- Home arena: Catena Arena (Capacity: 6,310)
- Colors
- General manager: Hampus Sjötröm
- Head coach: Dan Tangnes
- Captain: Anton Bengtsson
- Website: roglebk.se

Championships
- Champions Hockey League: 1 (2022)

Rögle BK (Rögle Bandyklubb) is a Swedish professional ice hockey club from Ängelholm that has been playing in the SHL since the 2015–16 season. Rögle has previously played in the SHL (previously named Elitserien) in 1992–1996, 2008–2010, and briefly in 2012–13.

They won the Champions Hockey League in 2022.

== History ==
Rögle BK was founded on 18 December 1932 as a Swedish bandy club, which is why the team is named "Rögle Bandyklubb" (or "bandy club"). The club was actually Scanian district champions in bandy in 1948. The club's ice hockey team played in the top Swedish league, at that time Division I, from 1966 to 1969, and again, in Elitserien as it was called at the time, between 1992–93 and 1995–96. After another twelve years in the second-tier division HockeyAllsvenskan, the team was promoted back to Elitserien after finishing second in the 2008 Kvalserien. Rögle BK began the 2008–09 Elitserien season surprisingly well, and after the first 18 rounds the team found itself at a top position, only goals behind leading Linköpings HC. However, Rögle BK finished eleventh in the 2008–09 Elitserien season and therefore had to play in the 2009 Kvalserien to stay in Elitserien, which they achieved after finishing second in Kvalserien for the second time in a row. In 2009–10 they ended last in the standings and had to play in the 2010 Kvalserien, where they subsequently failed to re-qualify for Elitserien and were relegated to HockeyAllsvenskan.

Rögle briefly returned to Elitserien after finishing second in the 2012 Kvalserien, becoming the first team to claim an Elitserien spot after winning the HockeyAllsvenskan playoff round to earn the last spot in the Kvalserien. However, after finishing last in the 2012–13 Elitserien season, Rögle had to play in the 2013 Kvalserien to stay in Elitserien, but the team failed to re-qualify and were relegated back to the second-tier league HockeyAllsvenskan; Rögle's return to Elitserien lasted for only one season.

The 2021–2022 season saw the club winning the Champions Hockey League by defeating Tappara from Finland, 2–1, in the final game in Ängelholm on 1 March 2022.

On 14 December 2022, the club announced its plans of starting a women's team for the 2023–2024 season, beginning with playing in the WDHL.

== Season-by-season record ==
This list features the five most recent seasons. For a more complete list, see List of Rögle BK seasons.

List of Rögle seasons
Season	Level	Division	Record		Avg. home atnd.	Notes	Ref.
Season	Level	Division	Position	W-OT-L	Avg. home atnd.	Notes	Ref.
2020–21	Tier 1	SHL	2nd	27–4–9–12	15		
2020–21	Swedish Championship playoffs		—	8–0–3–3	56	Won in quarterfinals 4–0 vs Frölunda HC; Won in semifinals 3–2 vs Skellefteå AIK; (silver) Lost in Finals 1–4 vs Växjö Lakers	
2021–22	Tier 1	SHL	1st	27–5–9–11	4,290		
2021–22	Swedish Championship playoffs		—	6–0–1–6	6,291	Won in quarterfinals 4–3 vs IK Oskarshamn; Lost in semifinals 2–4 vs Färjestad BK	
2022–23	Tier 1	SHL	9th	17–4–9–22	5,904		
2022–23	Eighth-finals		—	2–0–1–0	5,534	Won 2–1 vs Leksands IF	
2022–23	Swedish Championship playoffs		—	2–0–1–3	6,116	Lost in quarterfinals 2–4 vs Skellefteå AIK	
2023–24	Tier 1	SHL	9th	17–7–5–23	6,068		
2023–24	Eighth-finals		—	2–0–0–0	6,012	Won 2–0 vs Timrå IK	
2023–24	Swedish Championship playoffs		—	5–4–1–3	6,267	Won in quarterfinals 4–0 vs Färjestad BK; Won in semifinals 4–0 vs Växjö Lakers; (silver) Lost in finals 1–4 vs Skellefteå AIK	
2024–25	Tier 1	SHL	7th	21–5–8–18	6,198		
2024–25	Eighth-finals		—	0–0–1–1	6,310	Lost 0–2 vs Malmö Redhawks	

== Players and personnel ==
=== Current roster ===
Updated 3 July 2025.

No.	Nat	Player	Pos	S/G	Age	Acquired	Birthplace
28	(Sweden)	Anton Bengtsson (C)	C	L	33	2019	Nässjö, Sweden
45	(Austria)	Gregor Biber	D	L	19	2024	Krems, Austria
67	(Sweden)	Leon Bristedt (A)	LW	L	31	2024	Stockholm, Sweden
23	(Canada)	Josh Dickinson	C	L	28	2024	Georgetown, Ontario, Canada
16	(Sweden)	Lucas Ekeståhl-Jonsson	D	L	30	2023	Stockholm, Sweden
18	(Sweden)	Dennis Everberg (A)	RW	L	34	2019	Västerås, Sweden
95	(Canada)	Mark Friedman	D	R	30	2025	Toronto, Ontario, Canada
24	(Sweden)	Mattias Göransson	D	L	31	2024	Grums, Sweden
75	(Sweden)	Arvid Holm	G	L	27	2024	Ljungby, Sweden
62	(Czech Republic)	Luboš Horký	RW	R	28	2024	Znojmo, Czech Republic
58	(Sweden)	Filip Johansson	D	R	26	2024	Västerås, Sweden
83	(United States)	Karson Kuhlman	RW	R	30	2025	Esko, Minnesota, United States
6	(United States)	Paul LaDue	D	R	33	2025	Grand Forks, North Dakota, United States
52	(Sweden)	Felix Nilsson	C	L	21	2023	Stockholm, Sweden
22	(Sweden)	Fredrik Olofsson	LW	L	30	2025	Helsingborg, Sweden
65	(Sweden)	Christoffer Rifalk	G	L	30	2019	Kalix, Sweden
8	(Sweden)	Linus Sandin	RW	R	30	2022	Uppsala, Sweden
51	(Sweden)	Calle Själin	D	L	26	2024	Östersund, Sweden
27	(Sweden)	Linus Sjödin	C	L	23	2020	Ängelholm, Sweden
32	(Sweden)	Isac Solberg	W	L	21	2024	Ljungby, Sweden
37	(Sweden)	Albin Sundsvik	C	L	25	2023	Stockholm, Sweden
72	(Sweden)	Daniel Zaar	RW	R	32	2022	Helsingborg, Sweden
41	(Sweden)	Simon Zether	C	R	20	2023	Helsingborg, Sweden

=== Team captains ===
- Per Wallin, 2000–01
- Roger Hansson, 2001–03
- Pelle Svensson, 2003–05
- Kenny Jönsson, 2005–09
- Daniel Glimmenvall, 2009–10
- Eric Beaudoin, 2009–10
- Andrée Brendheden, 2010–11
- Jakob Johansson, 2011–13
- Andreas Lilja, 2013–15
- Christopher Liljewall, 2015–17
- Taylor Matson, 2018–19
- Mattias Sjögren, 2019–22
- Anton Bengtsson, 2022–present

=== Honored members ===
Rögle BK retired numbers
No.	Player	Position	Career	No. retirement
1	Kenth Svensson	G	1970–1987	–
9	Lennart Åkesson	F	1950–1964	–
13	Roger Elvenes	C	1984–2000	–
19	Kenny Jönsson	D	1991–1995, 2004–2009	–
25	Stefan Elvenes	F	1985–1995, 1997–2000	–
26	Jakob Johansson	C	1999–2014	–
