= Daniel Zaar =

Swedish ice hockey player

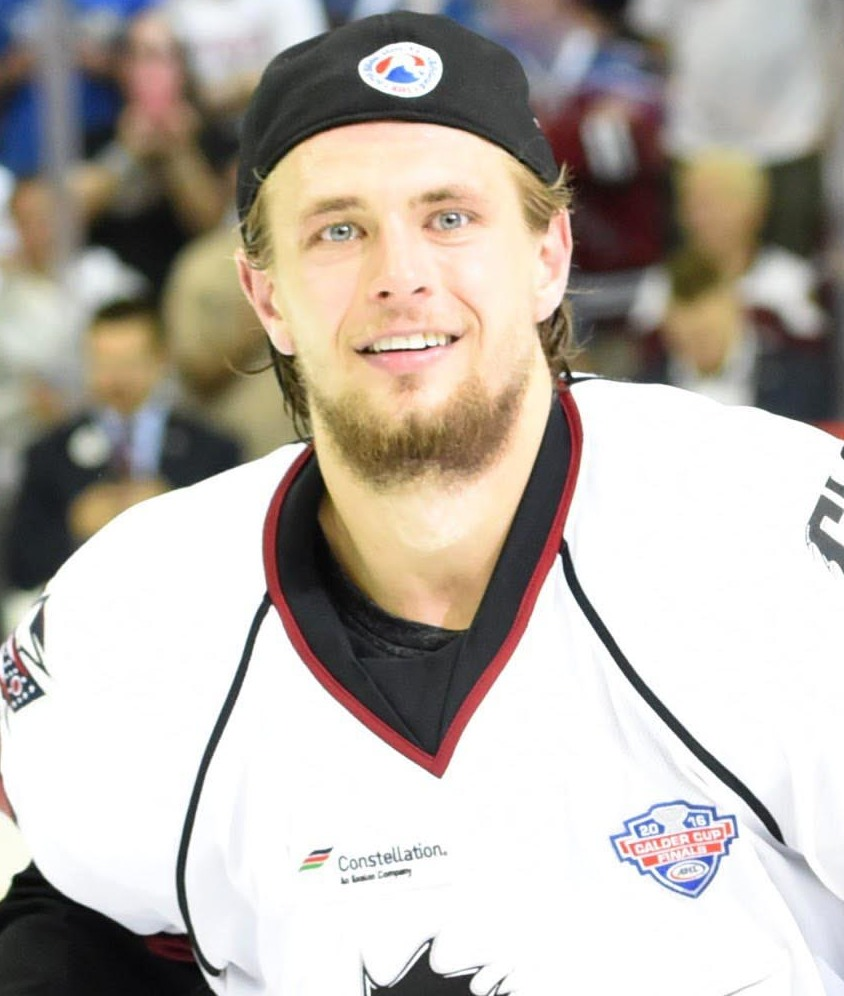
- Zaar after winning the 2016 Calder Cup Finals with the Monsters
- Born: 24 April 1994 (age 32) Helsingborg, Sweden
- Height: 6 ft 0 in (183 cm)
- Weight: 179 lb (81 kg; 12 st 11 lb)
- Position: Right wing
- Shoots: Right
- SHL team Former teams: Rögle BK; Luleå HF; Malmö Redhawks; Torpedo Nizhny Novgorod
- NHL draft: 152nd overall, 2012; Columbus Blue Jackets
- Playing career: 2012–present

Daniel Zaar (born 24 April 1994) is a Swedish professional ice hockey winger currently playing with Rögle BK in the Swedish Hockey League (SHL). Zaar was drafted in the sixth round, 152nd overall, in the 2012 NHL entry draft by the Columbus Blue Jackets.

== Playing career ==
Zaar scored his first Elitserien goal with Rögle BK on 11 October 2012, against Bernhard Starkbaum of Modo Hockey. On 30 May 2014, Zaar signed a three-year entry-level deal with the Blue Jackets. The following 2014–15 season, he remained in Sweden on loan from the Blue Jackets, transferring to Luleå HF. With his new team he won the 2014–15 Champions Hockey League.

In his first season in North America in 2015–16, Zaar was assigned to the American Hockey League and played a pivotal role in helping the Lake Erie Monsters win their first Calder Cup championship in franchise history. He was amongst the scoring lines with the Monsters, contributing with 21 goals in 71 games in the regular season before notching 7 goals and 12 points in 17 games en route to the Championship.

In the 2016–17 season, Zaar remained with the rebranded Cleveland Monsters. Limited to 55 games, Zaar was unable to build upon his rookie North American season in collecting 8 goals and 30 points.

As an impending restricted free agent, Zaar opted to continue his career in his native homeland in securing a two-year contract to return to the SHL with the Malmö Redhawks on 7 May 2017. In the 2017–18 season, Zaar in a top 6 scoring role contributed with 9 goals and 26 points in 50 games for the Redhawks. He registered only 2 assists in 10 post-season games.

On 26 April 2018, Zaar secured a release from the final year of his contract with the Redhawks in order to return to original club, Rögle BK, on a one-year contract.

Following his third season with Rögle BK, helping the club establish itself as a contending club in advancing to the Le Mat Trophy finals, Zaar left as a free agent and signed a lucrative two-year contract with Russian based club, Torpedo Nizhny Novgorod of the Kontinental Hockey League (KHL), on 11 June 2021. In the 2021–22 season, Zaar was limited to just 4 goals and 14 points through 28 regular season games. Unable to help Torpedo qualify for the playoffs for the first time in nine years, Zaar extended his season by returning to original club, Rögle BK, on 15 February 2022. Two weeks later, Zaar helped his new team win the 2021-22 Champions Hockey League, scoring both goals in the final against Tappara.

== Career statistics ==
			Regular season					Playoffs
Season	Team	League	GP	G	A	Pts	PIM	GP	G	A	Pts	PIM
2010–11	Rögle BK	J20	26	3	3	6	14	3	0	0	0	0
2011–12	Rögle BK	J20	44	14	24	38	28	7	5	3	8	8
2012–13	Rögle BK	J20	17	11	8	19	6	1	0	0	0	2
2012–13	Rögle BK	SHL	25	2	1	3	0	—	—	—	—	—
2012–13	BIK Karlskoga	Allsv	15	0	7	7	4	6	2	1	3	0
2013–14	Rögle BK	Allsv	52	16	20	36	28	16	6	16	22	16
2014–15	Luleå HF	SHL	55	9	18	27	18	7	2	1	3	2
2015–16	Lake Erie Monsters	AHL	71	21	22	43	22	17	7	5	12	4
2016–17	Cleveland Monsters	AHL	55	8	22	30	24	—	—	—	—	—
2017–18	Malmö Redhawks	SHL	50	9	17	26	6	10	0	2	2	2
2018–19	Rögle BK	SHL	50	13	22	35	16	2	1	1	2	12
2019–20	Rögle BK	SHL	48	16	21	37	14	—	—	—	—	—
2020–21	Rögle BK	SHL	52	18	32	50	22	11	4	4	8	0
2021–22	Torpedo Nizhny Novgorod	KHL	28	4	10	14	10	—	—	—	—	—
2021–22	Rögle BK	SHL	16	3	12	15	4	13	4	7	11	2
2022–23	Rögle BK	SHL	40	12	14	26	8	1	0	0	0	0
2023–24	Rögle BK	SHL	43	7	7	14	30	15	7	0	7	8
2025–26	Rögle BK	SHL	47	10	12	22	20	15	5	7	12	10
SHL totals			426	99	156	255	138	81	24	22	46	38

== Awards and honors ==
Awards	Year
Champions Hockey League
Champions Hockey League (Luleå)	2015
Champions Hockey League (Rögle)	2022
AHL
Calder Cup (Lake Erie Monsters)	2016
