= Mikkel Aagaard =

Danish ice hockey player (born 1995)

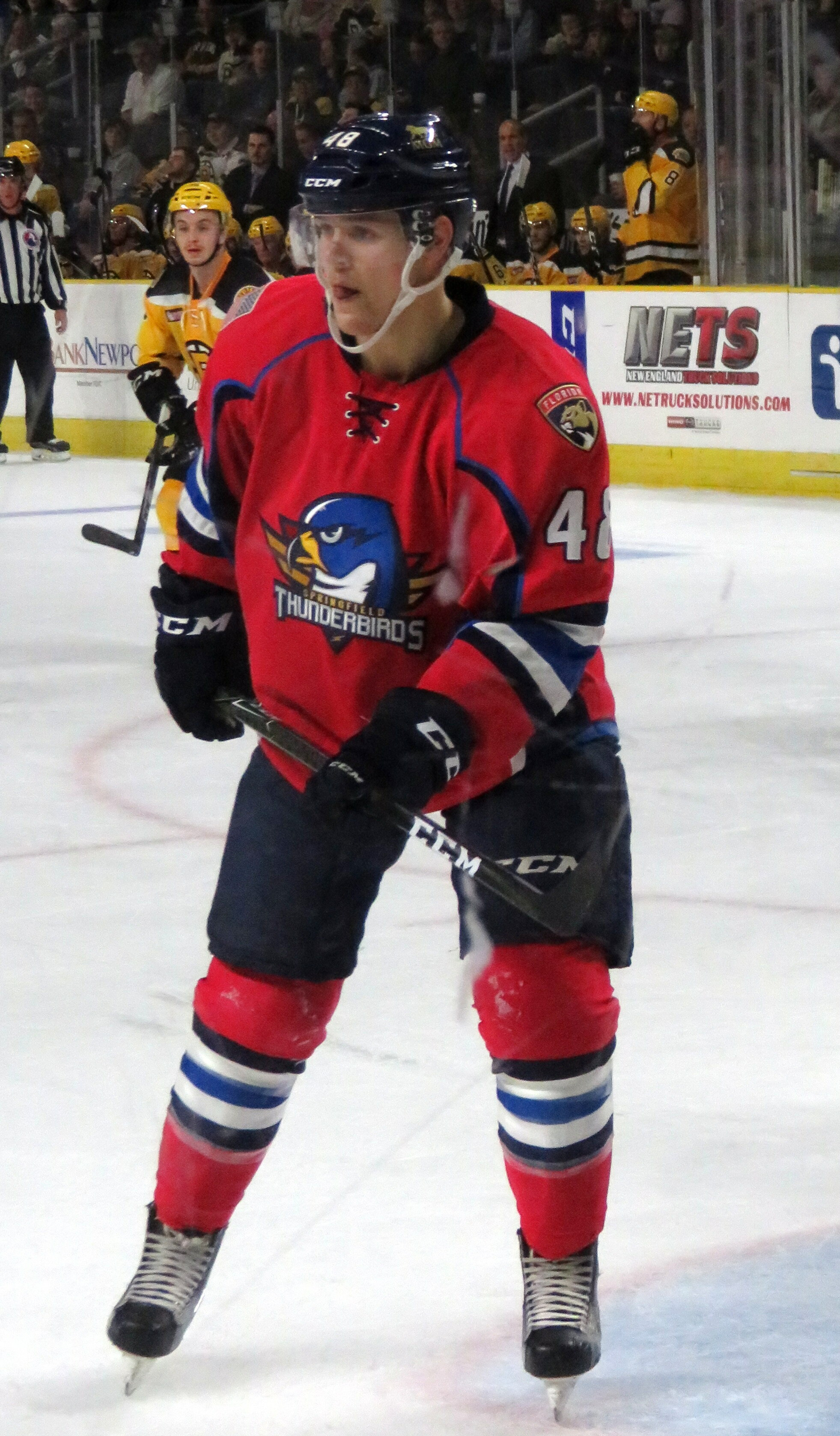
- Aagaard in 2017
- Born: 18 October 1995 (age 30) Frederikshavn, Denmark
- Height: 184 cm (6 ft 0 in)
- Weight: 84 kg (185 lb; 13 st 3 lb)
- Position: Forward
- Shoots: Left
- SHL team Former teams: Skellefteå AIK; Frederikshavn White Hawks; Grizzlys Wolfsburg; Modo Hockey
- National team: Denmark
- NHL draft: Undrafted
- Playing career: 2013–present

Mikkel Aagaard (born 18 October 1995) is a Danish professional ice hockey player who is a forward for Skellefteå AIK of the Swedish Hockey League (SHL).

== Playing career ==
Undrafted, Aagaard played in his native Denmark with Frederikshavn White Hawks before moving to North America to play major junior hockey in the Ontario Hockey League with the Niagara IceDogs and the Sudbury Wolves.

On 5 October 2016, he embarked on his North American pro career by signing with the Stockton Heat of the AHL for the 2016–17 season. Aagaard split the season between the Heat and its ECHL affiliate, the Adirondack Thunder. He compiled 11 points in 25 games with the Heat before appearing in 4 postseason games with the club.

As a free agent from the Heat, Aagaard opted to continue in the AHL after securing a try-out to attend the Springfield Thunderbirds training camp. In making a positive impression, Aagaard was signed to a standard one-year deal with the Thunderbirds for the 2017–18 season on 4 October 2017. Aagard appeared in 23 games with Springfield before he was reassigned to ECHL affiliate, the Manchester Monarchs, then later released from his contract on 1 February 2018.

Unsigned through the off-season, Aagaard decided to take a hiatus from his professional career, enrolling at the University of Guelph to major in accounting, while participating for the Gryphons in the Canadian Interuniversity Sport (CIS) on 19 September 2018.

Aagaard played parts of two seasons with Guelph before returning to the professional circuit to end the 2019–20 season, agreeing to a contract with German club, Grizzlys Wolfsburg of the Deutsche Eishockey Liga (DEL).

With the COVID-19 pandemic ending the DEL season before the playoffs, Aagaard moved to Sweden as a free agent, signing a two-year contract with MoDo Hockey of the Allsvenskan on 6 April 2020.

Aagaard established himself offensively during his five-season tenure with MoDo, leaving the club upon their demotion to the Allsvenskan following the 2024–25 season, signing a two-year contract to remain in the SHL with Skellefteå AIK on 25 April 2025.

== Career statistics ==
=== Regular season and playoffs ===
			Regular season					Playoffs
Season	Team	League	GP	G	A	Pts	PIM	GP	G	A	Pts	PIM
2012–13	Frederikshavn White Hawks	DEN	—	—	—	—	—	1	0	0	0	0
2013–14	Frederikshavn White Hawks	DEN	38	10	8	18	14	11	2	2	4	6
2014–15	Niagara IceDogs	OHL	59	15	26	41	16	11	4	2	6	14
2015–16	Niagara IceDogs	OHL	20	3	11	14	10	—	—	—	—	—
2015–16	Sudbury Wolves	OHL	44	21	18	39	50	—	—	—	—	—
2016–17	Adirondack Thunder	ECHL	38	13	26	39	51	—	—	—	—	—
2016–17	Stockton Heat	AHL	25	5	6	11	18	4	0	1	1	0
2017–18	Springfield Thunderbirds	AHL	23	4	1	5	18	—	—	—	—	—
2017–18	Manchester Monarchs	ECHL	18	3	9	12	14	—	—	—	—	—
2018–19	University of Guelph	OUA	4	0	1	1	8	9	8	8	16	6
2019–20	University of Guelph	OUA	28	22	24	46	70	1	0	0	0	0
2019–20	Grizzlys Wolfsburg	DEL	2	1	0	1	0	—	—	—	—	—
2020–21	MoDo Hockey	Allsv	51	21	13	34	63	—	—	—	—	—
2021–22	MoDo Hockey	Allsv	46	23	15	38	21	13	5	3	8	34
2022–23	MoDo Hockey	Allsv	50	29	14	43	31	17	8	7	15	14
2023–24	MoDo Hockey	SHL	52	16	17	33	23	—	—	—	—	—
2024–25	MoDo Hockey	SHL	52	19	14	33	38	—	—	—	—	—
2025–26	Skellefteå AIK	SHL	50	20	23	43	14	15	4	4	8	10
SHL totals			154	55	54	109	75	21	6	6	12	21

=== International ===
Year	Team	Event	Result	GP	G	A	Pts	PIM
2012	Denmark	U18	10th	6	0	0	0	2
2014	Denmark	WJC-D1	11th	5	3	5	8	2
2015	Denmark	WJC	8th	5	1	1	2	10
2016	Denmark	WC	8th	5	0	0	0	0
2017	Denmark	WC	12th	7	0	0	0	2
2022	Denmark	OG	7th	5	0	0	0	4
2022	Denmark	WC	9th	7	0	1	1	0
2023	Denmark	WC	10th	7	0	3	3	0
2024	Denmark	WC	13th	7	2	1	3	2
2024	Denmark	OGQ	Q	3	0	0	0	0
2025	Denmark	WC	4th	10	5	2	7	6
2026	Denmark	OG	9th	4	1	2	3	0
2026	Denmark	WC	12th	7	5	5	10	2
Junior totals				16	4	6	10	14
Senior totals				62	13	14	27	16
