= Fredrik Olofsson =

Swedish ice hockey player

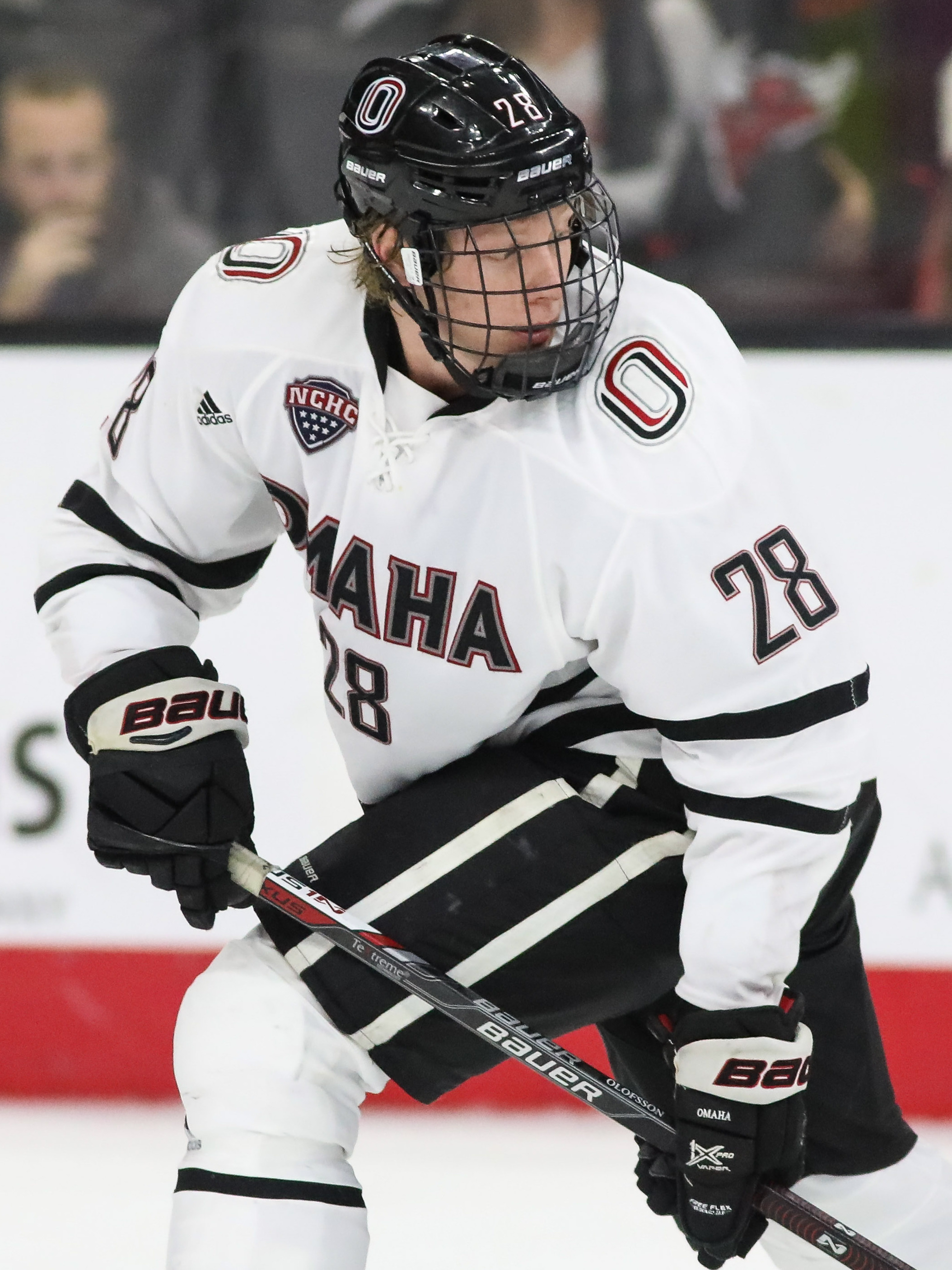
- Olofsson with the Omaha Mavericks in 2017
- Born: 27 May 1996 (age 30) Helsingborg, Sweden
- Height: 6 ft 1 in (185 cm)
- Weight: 185 lb (84 kg; 13 st 3 lb)
- Position: Forward
- Shoots: Left
- SHL team Former teams: Rögle BK; IK Oskarshamn; Dallas Stars; Colorado Avalanche; EV Zug
- National team: Sweden
- NHL draft: 98th overall, 2014; Chicago Blackhawks
- Playing career: 2019–present

Fredrik Olofsson (born 27 May 1996) is a Swedish professional ice hockey forward who is currently playing under contract with Rögle BK of the Swedish Hockey League (SHL). He was selected by Chicago Blackhawks in the fourth-round, 98th overall, of the 2014 NHL entry draft.

== Playing career ==
Olofsson was born in Sweden and raised in Broomfield, Colorado. He played for the Colorado Thunderbirds from 2009 to 2013. He then played for the Green Bay Gamblers of the United States Hockey League (USHL) during the 2012–13 season, where he appeared in eight games. He began the 2013–14 season with the Gamblers, recording two goals and four assists in 28 games. He was then traded to the Chicago Steel, where he finished the season with four goals and 11 assists in 24 games for the Steel. During the 2014–15 season, he recorded 27 goals and 33 assists in 57 games.

Olofsson was originally committed to play college ice hockey for Colorado College, along with his brother Gustav Olofsson. However, on 1 December 2014, he signed with the University of Nebraska Omaha. He played for the Mavericks from 2015 to 2019, where he recorded 35 goals and 60 assists in 137 games. On 6 September 2018, he was named as an assistant captain for his senior year, where he led the team in assists with 24. Following his collegiate career, he signed an amateur tryout contract with the Chicago Blackhawks' AHL affiliate the Rockford IceHogs on 21 March 2019. He appeared in two games for the IceHogs.

On 14 May 2019, he signed a one-year contract with Modo Hockey of the HockeyAllsvenskan. During the 2019–20 season, he recorded ten goals and 24 assists in 52 games. On 3 April 2020, he signed with IK Oskarshamn of the SHL. During the 2020–21 season, he recorded 13 goals and 21 assists in 51 games. Olofsson improved his offensive totals the following campaign, finishing second in team scoring with 42 points and a team leading 27 assists in 49 regular season games.

Following two seasons in the SHL with IK Oskarshamn, Olofsson returned to North America as a free agent and secured a one-year, $750,000 NHL contract with the Dallas Stars on 19 May 2022. After attending the Stars training camp, Olofsson was re-assigned to begin the 2022–23 season with AHL affiliate the Texas Stars. He was recalled to Dallas and made his NHL debut on 27 December 2022, in a 3-2 victory over the Nashville Predators. In his third game with the Stars, Olofsson notched his first career goal, scoring the game-winning goal in a 5-2 victory over the San Jose Sharks on 31 December 2022. Splitting the season with numerous recalls between NHL and AHL, Olofsson in a bottom six forward role finished the regular season having posted 4 points through 28 games. Remaining with Dallas through the playoffs, Olofsson made his post-season debut in replacing suspended captain Jamie Benn, appearing in the Stars only two wins in the conference finals defeat against the Vegas Golden Knights.

As a pending unrestricted free agent, on 15 June 2023, Olofsson was traded by the Stars to the Colorado Avalanche in exchange for future considerations. Marking his return to Colorado, he was immediately signed by the Avalanche to a one-year, two-way contract for the 2023–24 season. After making a positive impression at the Avalanche's 2023 training camp, Olofsson made the opening night roster for the 2023–24 season. Deployed as the team's fourth-line center, Olofsson notched career NHL offensive bests with 3 goals and 6 assists for 9 points through 57 regular season games before he was waived by the Avalanche and assigned to AHL affiliate, the Colorado Eagles, to close out the remainder of the season.

As a free agent at the conclusion of his contract with the Avalanche, Olofsson opted to pause his North American career in agreeing to a two-year contract with Swiss club, EV Zug of the National League (NL), on 8 July 2024. In the 2024–25 season, Olofsson increased his offensive output, registering 6 goals and 29 points through 47 regular season games.

After a swift first-round exit, Olofsson was released from the remaining year of his contract with Zug in order to take up a three-year offer to return to the SHL with Rögle BK on 12 May 2025.

== International play ==
On 1 January 2022, Olofsson was named to Sweden men's national ice hockey team to compete at the 2022 Winter Olympics. He contributed with 1 assist through 6 tournament games as Sweden finished in fourth place.

== Personal life ==
Fredrik's older brother, Gustav, is a professional ice hockey player.

== Career statistics ==
=== Regular season and playoffs ===
			Regular season					Playoffs
Season	Team	League	GP	G	A	Pts	PIM	GP	G	A	Pts	PIM
2012–13	Green Bay Gamblers	USHL	40	1	2	3	4	—	—	—	—	—
2013–14	Green Bay Gamblers	USHL	28	2	4	6	21	—	—	—	—	—
2013–14	Chicago Steel	USHL	24	4	11	15	24	—	—	—	—	—
2014–15	Chicago Steel	USHL	57	27	33	60	14	—	—	—	—	—
2015–16	University of Nebraska Omaha	NCHC	34	8	9	17	14	—	—	—	—	—
2016–17	University of Nebraska Omaha	NCHC	34	11	13	24	21	—	—	—	—	—
2017–18	University of Nebraska Omaha	NCHC	33	6	14	20	16	—	—	—	—	—
2018–19	University of Nebraska Omaha	NCHC	36	10	24	34	12	—	—	—	—	—
2018–19	Rockford IceHogs	AHL	2	0	0	0	0	—	—	—	—	—
2019–20	Modo Hockey	Allsv	52	10	24	34	12	2	0	1	1	0
2020–21	IK Oskarshamn	SHL	51	13	21	34	12	—	—	—	—	—
2021–22	IK Oskarshamn	SHL	49	15	27	42	6	9	2	6	8	0
2022–23	Texas Stars	AHL	37	5	9	14	20	—	—	—	—	—
2022–23	Dallas Stars	NHL	28	1	3	4	2	2	0	0	0	0
2023–24	Colorado Avalanche	NHL	57	3	6	9	8	—	—	—	—	—
2023–24	Colorado Eagles	AHL	20	3	9	12	8	3	0	1	1	0
2024–25	EV Zug	NL	47	6	23	29	45	4	1	0	1	25
2025–26	Rögle BK	SHL	52	12	26	38	12	17	5	6	11	6
SHL totals			152	40	74	114	30	26	7	12	19	6
NHL totals			85	4	9	13	10	2	0	0	0	0

=== International ===
Year	Team	Event	Result	GP	G	A	Pts	PIM
2013	Sweden	IH18	7th	4	0	1	1	2
2022	Sweden	OG	4th	6	0	1	1	0
Junior totals				4	0	1	1	2
Senior totals				6	0	1	1	0
