= Oliver Okuliar =

Slovak ice hockey player (born 2000)

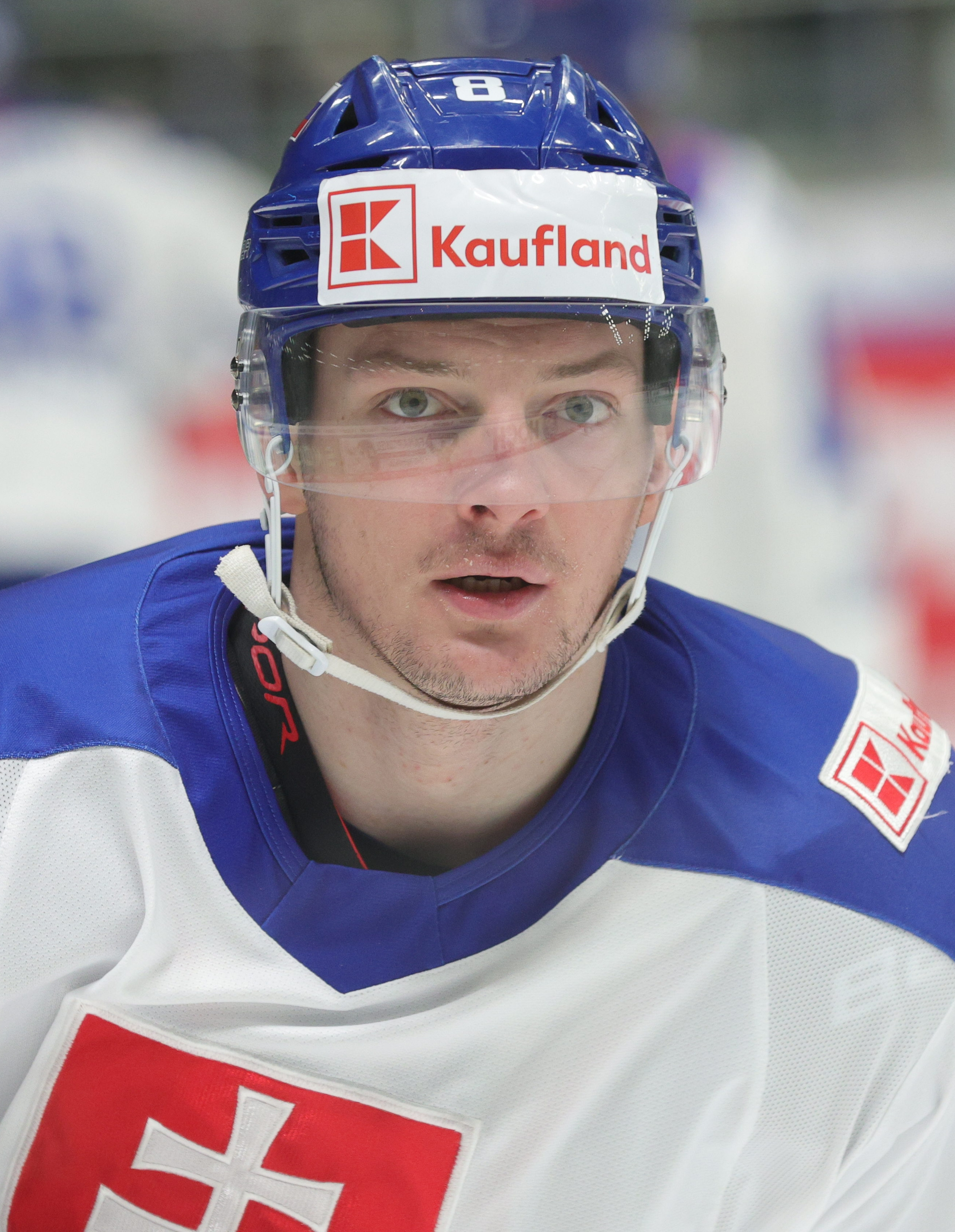
- Okuliar in 2024
- Born: 24 May 2000 (age 26) Trenčín, Slovakia
- Height: 6 ft 2 in (188 cm)
- Weight: 190 lb (86 kg; 13 st 8 lb)
- Position: Winger
- Shoots: Left
- NHL team (P) Cur. team Former teams: Pittsburgh Penguins; WBS Penguins (AHL); HK Dukla Trenčín; HK 32 Liptovský Mikuláš; SaiPa; Mountfield HK; Skellefteå AIK
- National team: Slovakia
- NHL draft: Undrafted
- Playing career: 2017–present

Oliver Okuliar (born 24 May 2000) is a Slovak professional ice hockey player who is a winger for the Wilkes-Barre/Scranton Penguins in the American Hockey League (AHL) while under contract to the Pittsburgh Penguins of the National Hockey League (NHL). He previously was under contract to the Florida Panthers, and has played for several teams in various major leagues across Europe.

== Playing career ==
On 12 April 2024, Okuliar signed a one-year, entry-level contract with the Florida Panthers of the National Hockey League (NHL). After attending the Panthers training camp for the 2024–25 season, Okuliar was reassigned to American Hockey League affiliate, the Charlotte Checkers for the entirety of his contract. He contributed offensively with the Checkers in posting 19 goals and 41 points through 69 regular season games. He notched 8 points in 18 playoff contests, helping the Charlotte reach the Calder Cup finals.

As a pending free agent, Okuliar opted to leave North America, signing a two-year contract with Swedish club, Skellefteå AIK of the Swedish Hockey League (SHL), on 26 June 2025.

Following his first season with Skellefteå, Okuliar's NHL rights were traded by the Panthers to the Pittsburgh Penguins in exchange for Emil Pieniniemi on 13 June 2026. Two days later, Okuliar enacted his NHL out clause and returned to North America for the 2026–27 season after agreeing to a one-year, two-way contract with the Penguins.

== International play ==
He represented Slovakia senior team at the 2023 World Championship, where he recorded one assist through 6 appearances.

== Career statistics ==
=== Regular season and playoffs ===
			Regular season					Playoffs
Season	Team	League	GP	G	A	Pts	PIM	GP	G	A	Pts	PIM
2016–17	Team Slovakia U18	SVK U20	38	14	12	26	22	—	—	—	—	—
2016–17	HK Dukla Trenčín	SVK U20	3	2	4	6	14	10	1	6	7	12
2017–18	HK Dukla Trenčín	SVK U20	37	24	40	64	137	18	10	14	24	56
2017–18	HK Dukla Trenčín	Slovak	1	0	0	0	0	—	—	—	—	—
2017–18	HK 95 Panthers Považská Bystrica	Slovak.1	4	0	0	0	6	—	—	—	—	—
2018–19	Sherbrooke Phoenix	QMJHL	66	14	28	42	46	10	1	3	4	6
2019–20	Lethbridge Hurricanes	WHL	55	33	35	68	51	—	—	—	—	—
2020–21	HK 32 Liptovský Mikuláš	Slovak	6	3	5	8	14	—	—	—	—	—
2020–21	HK Dukla Trenčín	Slovak	41	17	22	39	76	10	1	4	5	24
2021–22	SaiPa	Liiga	56	8	10	18	55	—	—	—	—	—
2022–23	Mountfield HK	ELH	39	13	16	29	39	18	3	9	12	18
2023–24	Mountfield HK	ELH	52	24	21	45	53	8	0	2	2	4
2024–25	Charlotte Checkers	AHL	69	19	22	41	119	18	4	4	8	18
2025–26	Skellefteå AIK	SHL	46	15	14	29	38	15	6	7	13	6
Slovak totals			48	20	27	47	90	10	1	4	5	24
Liiga totals			56	8	10	18	55	—	—	—	—	—
ELH totals			91	37	37	74	92	26	3	11	14	22

=== International ===
Year	Team	Event	Result	GP	G	A	Pts	PIM
2017	Slovakia	IH18	8th	4	1	1	2	6
2018	Slovakia	U18	7th	5	4	4	8	6
2020	Slovakia	WJC	8th	5	2	2	4	16
2023	Slovakia	WC	9th	6	0	1	1	6
2026	Slovakia	OG	4th	6	1	1	2	4
2026	Slovakia	WC	9th	7	2	3	5	8
Junior totals				14	7	7	14	28
Senior totals				19	3	5	8	18
