= Lauri Pajuniemi =

Finnish ice hockey player

- Born: 12 September 1999 (age 27) Tampere, Finland
- Height: 6 ft 0 in (183 cm)
- Weight: 183 lb (83 kg; 13 st 1 lb)
- Position: Right wing
- Shoots: Right
- SHL team Former teams: Malmö Redhawks; HC TPS; Lausanne HC
- NHL draft: 132nd overall, 2018; New York Rangers
- Playing career: 2013–present

Lauri Pajuniemi (born 12 September 1999) is a Finnish professional ice hockey player for the Malmö Redhawks of the Swedish Hockey League (SHL). Pajuniemi was selected in the fifth round, 132nd overall, of the 2018 NHL entry draft by the Rangers.

== Playing career ==
In the 2019–20 season, Pajuniemi's 26 goals scored with HC TPS tied for third in Liiga with Eemeli Suomi, behind just Julius Nättinen and Justin Danforth. Pajuniemi credited his emergence from a third or fourth line role player into a significant goal scorer to his coaches telling him to have confidence that he could score more than one goal a game.

On 29 April 2021, Pajuniemi was signed by the New York Rangers to a two-year, entry-level contract.

On 23 May 2023, Pajuniemi signed a one-year contract with the Malmö Redhawks of the Swedish Hockey League (SHL).

On 3 June 2024, Pajuniemi signed a two-year contract with the Lausanne HC of the Swiss National League (NL) alongside Malmö teammate Janne Kuokkanen.

On 2 June 2025, Pajuniemi and the Lausanne HC agreed to terminate his contract. He returned, alongside Kuokkanen, to the Malmö Redhawks with a contract lasting until the end of the 2027–28 season.

== Career statistics ==
=== Regular season and playoffs ===
			Regular season					Playoffs
Season	Team	League	GP	G	A	Pts	PIM	GP	G	A	Pts	PIM
2015–16	TPS	Jr. A	1	0	0	0	0	—	—	—	—	—
2016–17	TPS	Jr. A	37	8	17	25	2	3	0	2	2	0
2017–18	TPS	Jr. A	14	3	7	10	18	—	—	—	—	—
2017–18	TPS	Liiga	32	2	5	7	4	9	3	1	4	2
2018–19	TPS	Liiga	44	5	8	13	20	4	0	0	0	14
2018–19	TUTO	Mestis	1	0	0	0	0	—	—	—	—	—
2019–20	TPS	Liiga	49	26	14	40	10	—	—	—	—	—
2019–20	TPS	Jr. A	—	—	—	—	—	2	0	0	0	0
2020–21	TPS	Liiga	48	22	16	38	38	13	4	4	8	8
2021–22	Hartford Wolf Pack	AHL	51	13	13	26	14	—	—	—	—	—
2022–23	Hartford Wolf Pack	AHL	68	19	19	38	32	9	4	2	6	4
2023–24	Malmö Redhawks	SHL	43	15	20	35	26	—	—	—	—	—
2024–25	Lausanne HC	NL	41	9	12	21	22	5	1	0	1	2
2025–26	Malmö Redhawks	SHL	51	16	22	38	54	8	1	1	2	4
Liiga totals			173	55	43	98	72	26	7	5	12	24
SHL totals			94	31	42	73	80	8	1	1	2	4

=== International ===
Year	Team	Event	Result	GP	G	A	Pts	PIM
2016	Finland	IH18	6th	4	1	0	1	0
Junior totals				4	1	0	1	0
