= Arvid Holm =

Swedish ice hockey player (born 1998)

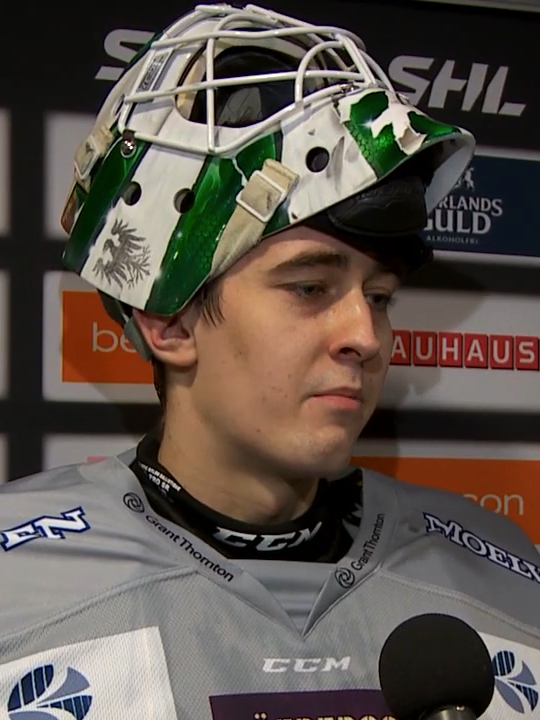
- Holm with Färjestad BK in 2020
- Born: 3 November 1998 (age 27) Ljungby, Sweden
- Height: 193 cm (6 ft 4 in)
- Weight: 93 kg (205 lb; 14 st 9 lb)
- Position: Goaltender
- Catches: Left
- SHL team Former teams: Rögle BK; Färjestad BK
- NHL draft: 167th overall, 2017; Winnipeg Jets
- Playing career: 2019–present

Arvid Holm (born 3 November 1998) is a Swedish professional ice hockey goaltender who currently plays for Rögle BK of the Swedish Hockey League (SHL). Holm was drafted in the sixth round, 167th overall, of the 2017 NHL entry draft by the Winnipeg Jets.

== Playing career ==
Holm played in native Sweden with Färjestad BK of the Swedish Hockey League (SHL). On 16 June 2020, Holm was signed to a three-year, entry-level contract with his draft club, the Winnipeg Jets.

After his entry-level contract with the Jets, Holm was not tendered a qualifying offer and was released as a free agent. On 1 July, 2023, Holm was promptly signed to a one-year, two-way contract with the Colorado Avalanche. After attending his first training camp with the Avalanche, Holm was re-assigned to begin the 2023–24 season with AHL affiliate, the Colorado Eagles, on 2 October 2023. Holm made 9 appearances with the Eagles through the first half of the season, serving primarily as backup, before he was re-assigned to secondary affiliate, the Utah Grizzlies of the ECHL, on 16 February 2024. Holm split the year between the Eagles and Grizzlies, before concluding the season with the Avalanche in the post-season by serving as backup during the opening playoff game against the Winnipeg Jets. He remained with the squad for the remainder of the playoffs, primarily used as the rotational practice goaltender.

On 10 May 2024, as a pending restricted free agent, Holm opted to return to Sweden by signing a three-year contract with Rögle BK of the SHL.

== Career statistics ==
			Regular season									Playoffs
Season	Team	League	GP	W	L	T/OT	MIN	GA	SO	GAA	SV%	GP	W	L	MIN	GA	SO	GAA	SV%
2016–17	Karlskrona HK	J20	26	7	17	0	1483	72	1	2.91	.906	—	—	—	—	—	—	—	—
2017–18	Karlskrona HK	J20	39	17	22	0	2267	130	0	3.44	.888	6	3	3	—	—	0	3.20	.901
2018–19	Karlskrona HK	Allsv	32	16	15	0	1841	79	1	2.58	.907	5	1	3	245	17	0	4.17	.841
2019–20	Färjestad BK	SHL	31	20	10	0	1825	69	1	2.27	.915	—	—	—	—	—	—	—	—
2020–21	Färjestad BK	SHL	24	13	10	0	1311	59	1	2.70	.914	2	0	2	151	7	0	2.80	.911
2021–22	Manitoba Moose	AHL	11	7	3	1	667	26	1	2.34	.903	—	—	—	—	—	—	—	—
2022–23	Manitoba Moose	AHL	35	18	11	4	1956	87	0	2.67	.911	1	0	0	52	3	0	3.49	.824
2023–24	Colorado Eagles	AHL	12	6	6	0	686	34	1	2.97	.887	—	—	—	—	—	—	—	—
2023–24	Utah Grizzlies	ECHL	4	2	2	0	238	12	0	3.02	.907	—	—	—	—	—	—	—	—
2024–25	Rögle BK	SHL	35	17	17	0	2055	65	4	1.90	.924	2	0	2	121	5	0	2.48	.896
2025–26	Rögle BK	SHL	35	19	15	0	2056	80	4	2.33	.891	15	9	6	845	32	1	2.27	.907
SHL totals			125	69	52	0	7,246	273	10	2.26	.912	19	9	10	1,117	44	1	2.37	.907
