= Calle Själin =

Swedish ice hockey player

- Born: 2 September 1999 (age 26) Östersund, Sweden
- Height: 6 ft 1 in (185 cm)
- Weight: 179 lb (81 kg; 12 st 11 lb)
- Position: Defence
- Shoots: Left
- SHL team Former teams: Rögle BK; Leksands IF
- National team: Sweden
- NHL draft: 145th overall, 2017; New York Rangers
- Playing career: 2016–present

Calle Själin (born 2 September 1999) is a Swedish professional ice hockey defenceman for Rögle BK of the Swedish Hockey League (SHL). Själin was selected in the fifth round, 145th overall, of the 2017 NHL entry draft by the New York Rangers.

== Playing career ==
With his draft rights expired from the Rangers, Själin remained with Leksands IF in the Swedish Hockey League (SHL). In the 2021–22 season, Själin notched career highs with six goals and 16 assists for 22 points in 46 regular season games with Leksands IF.

On 10 June 2022, Själin was signed to a two-year, entry-level contract with the Florida Panthers.

During the 2023–24 season, on 8 March 2024, Själin was traded to the Buffalo Sabres along with a conditional 2024 seventh-round pick in exchange for forward Kyle Okposo. He played out the remainder of the season by continuing in the AHL with the Sabres' affiliate, the Rochester Americans, posting 4 points through 9 games.

After two seasons in North America, Själin opted to return to Sweden in signing a two-year contract with SHL club, Rögle BK, on 14 May 2024.

== Career statistics ==
=== Regular season and playoffs ===
			Regular season					Playoffs
Season	Team	League	GP	G	A	Pts	PIM	GP	G	A	Pts	PIM
2016–17	Östersunds IK	Div.1	34	5	10	15	26	—	—	—	—	—
2016–17	Timrå IK	J20	1	0	1	1	0	4	0	0	0	2
2016–17	Timrå IK	Allsv	2	0	0	0	0	4	1	0	1	0
2017–18	Leksands IF	J20	13	0	5	5	10	2	0	0	0	0
2017–18	Leksands IF	Allsv	24	0	3	3	8	4	0	0	0	0
2018–19	Leksands IF	Allsv	20	2	5	7	4	—	—	—	—	—
2019–20	Leksands IF	J20	3	2	0	2	2	—	—	—	—	—
2019–20	Leksands IF	SHL	13	0	0	0	2	—	—	—	—	—
2019–20	Västerås IK	Allsv	23	0	3	3	6	—	—	—	—	—
2020–21	Leksands IF	SHL	48	1	6	7	6	4	0	0	0	0
2021–22	Leksands IF	SHL	46	6	16	22	8	3	1	0	1	2
2022–23	Charlotte Checkers	AHL	39	5	3	8	22	5	1	0	1	4
2023–24	Charlotte Checkers	AHL	22	0	3	3	14	—	—	—	—	—
2023–24	Rochester Americans	AHL	9	1	3	4	0	—	—	—	—	—
2024–25	Rögle BK	SHL	35	4	5	9	8	2	0	0	0	0
SHL totals			142	11	27	38	24	9	1	0	1	2

=== International ===
Year	Team	Event	Result	GP	G	A	Pts	PIM
2017	Sweden	U18	4th	6	0	0	0	2
Junior totals				6	0	0	0	2
