= Mark Friedman =

Canadian ice hockey player

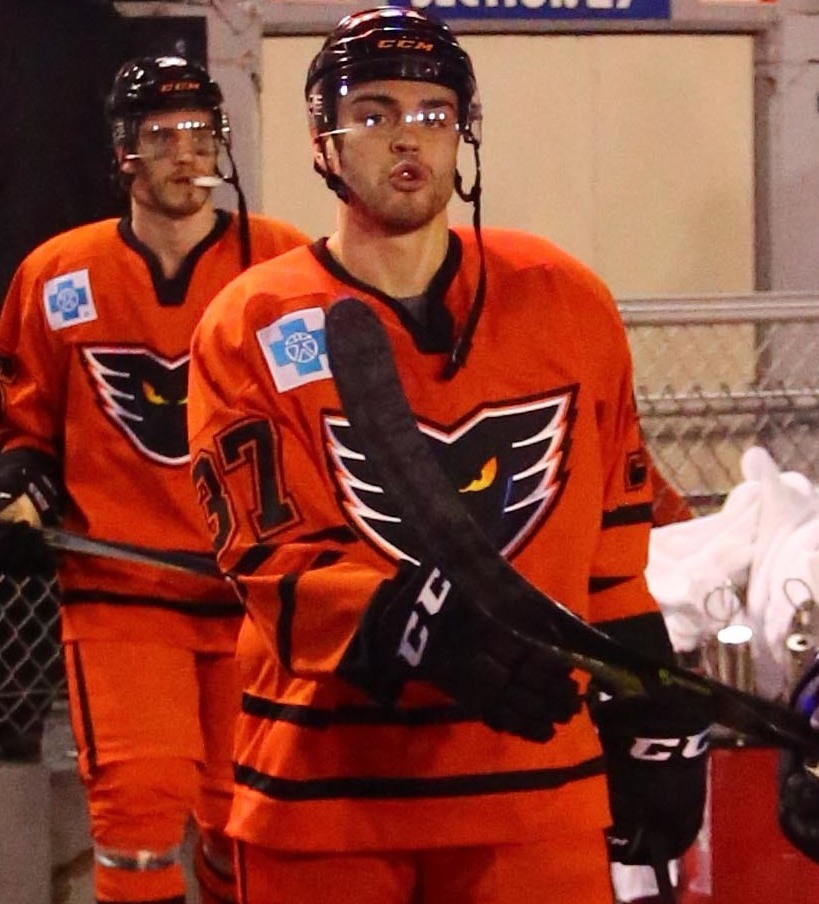
- Friedman with the Lehigh Valley Phantoms in 2018
- Born: December 25, 1995 (age 30) Toronto, Ontario, Canada
- Height: 5 ft 11 in (180 cm)
- Weight: 185 lb (84 kg; 13 st 3 lb)
- Position: Defence
- Shoots: Right
- SHL team Former teams: Rögle BK; Philadelphia Flyers; Pittsburgh Penguins; Vancouver Canucks
- NHL draft: 86th overall, 2014; Philadelphia Flyers
- Playing career: 2017–present

Mark Isaac Friedman (born December 25, 1995) is a Canadian professional ice hockey defenceman for Rögle BK of the Swedish Hockey League (SHL). He was selected 86th overall in the 3rd round of the 2014 NHL entry draft by the Philadelphia Flyers, and has also played for the Pittsburgh Penguins and Vancouver Canucks. Prior to turning professional, Friedman played for the Bowling Green Falcons for three seasons where he was named to the WCHA All-Rookie Team and First Team All-WCHA.

== Early life ==
Friedman was born on December 25, 1995, in Toronto, Ontario, to parents Jeff and Joanne Friedman. Ice hockey ran in Friedman's family: when his father and uncle played minor ice hockey, they had been coached by Friedman's grandfather. Friedman began ice skating around the age of three and began playing hockey soon afterwards. He frequently ran into trouble at school, and he was known among his peers for his competitive nature in athletic competitions. Friedman referred to himself as "a pretty feisty guy growing up", in part because he was physically smaller than many of his teammates and "had to stand out somehow".

Friedman spent his adolescence in the Greater Toronto Hockey League (GTHL) with the Don Mills Flyers, the same team for whom his father and uncle had played. During the 2009–10 season, Friedman and the Flyers captured the Kraft Cup for the GTHL's regular-season champions. That season, he scored 20 goals and 64 points in 85 games while recording 125 penalty minutes. While still playing for Don Mills, Friedman joined the North York Rangers of the Ontario Junior Hockey League (OJHL) for two games during their 2010-11 season. The following season, he joined the Rangers in full, where he led the team's defencemen in scoring with nine goals and 27 points in 48 regular-season games. He added an additional goal and three assists in four postseason OJHL games.

== Playing career ==
=== Junior ===
Friedman played for the Waterloo Blackhawks of the United States Hockey League (USHL) in 2012–14. In 2014, he was named USHL Second All-Star Team.

He was selected in the 3rd round the 2014 NHL entry draft by the Philadelphia Flyers, the 86th overall pick of the draft.

=== NCAA ===
Prior to turning professional, Friedman played for the Bowling Green Falcons for three seasons on a full hockey scholarship. At the conclusion of his freshman year, Friedman was named to the WCHA All-Rookie Team and the Falcons' co-Rookie of the Year. Following his successful freshman campaign, Friedman was invited to the Flyers prospect and development camp before the 2015–16 season. In his sophomore season, Friedman was named to the First Team All-WCHA.

=== Professional ===
==== Philadelphia Flyers ====
Friedman signed an entry-level contract with the Flyers on March 21, 2017. He was reassigned to their American Hockey League affiliate, the Lehigh Valley Phantoms.

He made his NHL debut on April 6, 2019, vs. the Carolina Hurricanes. On this date Friedman became the second Jewish player in Flyers history.

In July 2020, Friedman and the Flyers agreed to a two-year, one-way contract extension, with an average annual value of $725,000. Remaining on the Flyers roster for the pandemic delayed 2020–21 season, Friedman made 4 appearances from the blueline before he was placed on waivers on February 23, 2021. On the following day, Friedman was claimed by Flyers' division rival, the Pittsburgh Penguins, under the influence of the newly hired and former Flyers general manager, Ron Hextall.

==== Pittsburgh Penguins ====
On February 24, 2021, Pittsburgh Penguins general manager Ron Hextall announced that they had claimed Friedman off of waivers. He scored his first NHL goal against his former team in an eventual 4–3 loss and left the game early after a hit from Nolan Patrick. Since joining the Penguins, Friedman has been vocal in his preference of Pittsburgh over Philadelphia, calling Philadelphia noisy and dirty.

==== Vancouver Canucks ====
On October 17, 2023, Friedman was traded alongside Ty Glover to the Vancouver Canucks, in exchange for Karel Plášek and Jack Rathbone.

==== Nashville Predators ====
After spending most of the 2024–25 season with the Canucks' AHL affiliate, the Abbotsford Canucks, Friedman was traded to the Nashville Predators on February 7, 2025, in exchange for future considerations. While with the Predators, Friedman played out the remainder of his contract assigned to the AHL with the Milwaukee Admirals.

==== Rögle BK ====
As a pending free agent, Friedman left the Predators and opted to embark on a career abroad by signing a two-year contract with Swedish club, Rögle BK of the SHL, on June 5, 2025.

== Personal life ==
Friedman is Jewish. His paternal grandfather, Mark Friedman (for whom he was named), played golf for the University of Miami.

== Career statistics ==
			Regular season					Playoffs
Season	Team	League	GP	G	A	Pts	PIM	GP	G	A	Pts	PIM
2012–13	Waterloo Black Hawks	USHL	64	8	27	35	44	5	2	3	5	2
2013–14	Waterloo Black Hawks	USHL	51	10	30	40	30	12	0	7	7	4
2014–15	Bowling Green State University	WCHA	39	2	17	19	75	—	—	—	—	—
2015–16	Bowling Green State University	WCHA	42	6	17	23	40	—	—	—	—	—
2016–17	Bowling Green State University	WCHA	40	8	18	26	28	—	—	—	—	—
2016–17	Lehigh Valley Phantoms	AHL	1	0	1	1	0	—	—	—	—	—
2017–18	Lehigh Valley Phantoms	AHL	65	2	14	16	18	13	2	0	2	8
2018–19	Lehigh Valley Phantoms	AHL	75	5	21	26	68	—	—	—	—	—
2018–19	Philadelphia Flyers	NHL	1	0	0	0	0	—	—	—	—	—
2019–20	Lehigh Valley Phantoms	AHL	45	3	15	18	30	—	—	—	—	—
2019–20	Philadelphia Flyers	NHL	6	0	1	1	2	—	—	—	—	—
2020–21	Philadelphia Flyers	NHL	4	0	0	0	4	—	—	—	—	—
2020–21	Pittsburgh Penguins	NHL	5	2	1	3	5	—	—	—	—	—
2021–22	Wilkes-Barre/Scranton Penguins	AHL	2	0	0	0	2	—	—	—	—	—
2021–22	Pittsburgh Penguins	NHL	26	1	4	5	23	6	1	0	1	0
2022–23	Wilkes-Barre/Scranton Penguins	AHL	24	1	5	6	19	—	—	—	—	—
2022–23	Pittsburgh Penguins	NHL	23	1	2	3	15	—	—	—	—	—
2023–24	Wilkes-Barre/Scranton Penguins	AHL	2	0	0	0	0	—	—	—	—	—
2023–24	Abbotsford Canucks	AHL	4	1	3	4	4	—	—	—	—	—
2023–24	Vancouver Canucks	NHL	23	0	1	1	21	—	—	—	—	—
2024–25	Abbotsford Canucks	AHL	20	1	5	6	15	—	—	—	—	—
2024–25	Vancouver Canucks	NHL	5	0	0	0	10	—	—	—	—	—
2024–25	Milwaukee Admirals	AHL	21	2	11	13	10	10	1	2	3	4
NHL totals			93	4	9	13	80	6	1	0	1	0

== Awards and honors ==
Award	Year
College
WCHA All-Rookie Team	2014–15
All-WCHA First Team	2015–16
All-WCHA Third Team	2016–17

== See also ==
- List of select Jewish ice hockey players
