= Dan Tangnes =

Norwegian ice hockey player and coach

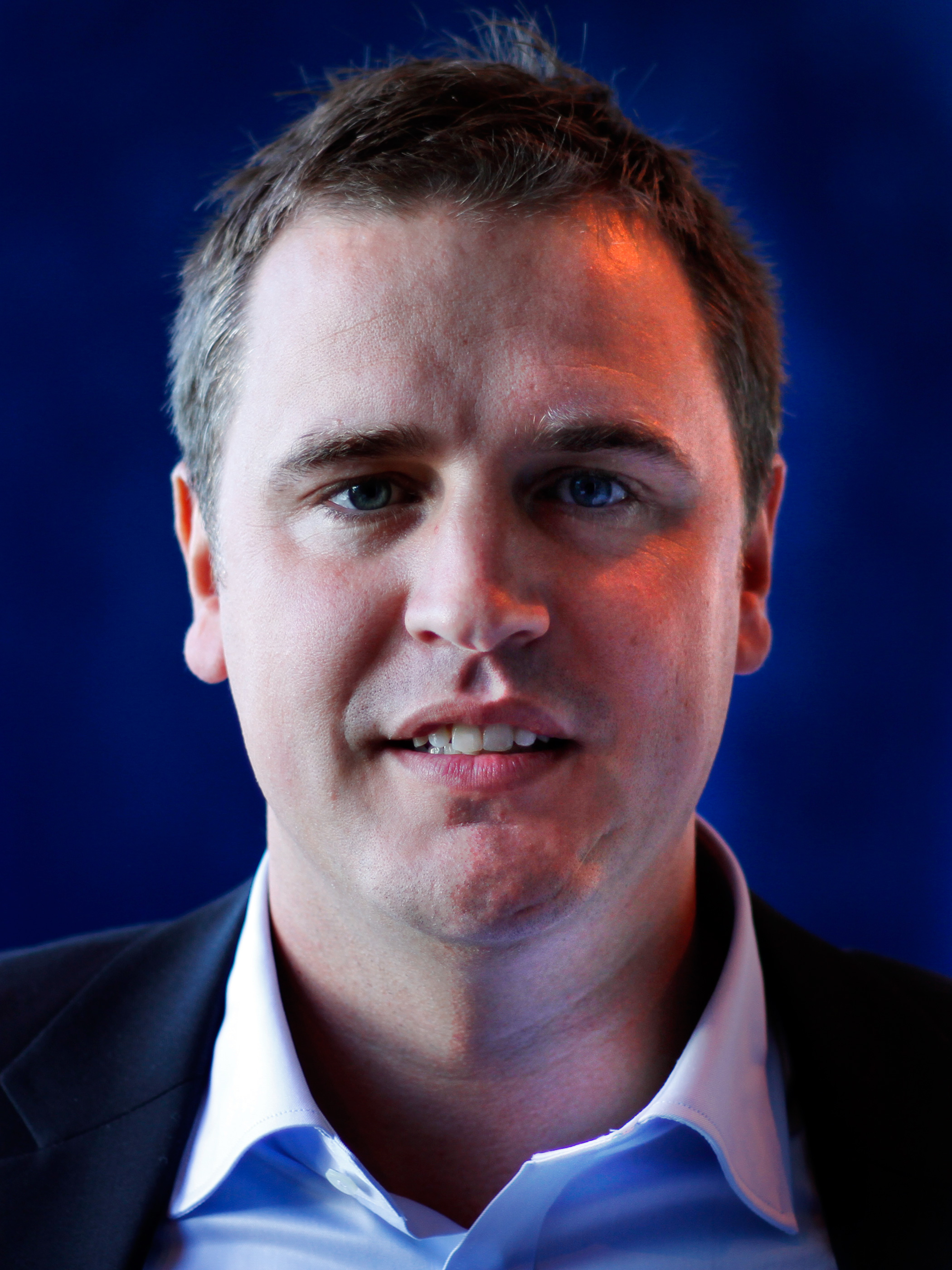
- Dan Tangnes, September 2012
- Born: 3 March 1979 (age 46); Oslo, Norway
- Height: 5 ft 10 in (178 cm)
- Weight: 176 lb (80 kg; 12 st 8 lb)
- Position: Forward
- Shot: Left
- Played for: Rögle BK; Lillehammer IK
- NHL draft: Undrafted
- Playing career: 1997–2005

Dan Tangnes (born 3 March 1979) is a Norwegian ice hockey coach. He is currently the head coach for Rögle BK of the SHL in Sweden.

On October 24, 2013, Tangnes was replaced by Magnus Bogren as head coach of Rögle BK, then of HockeyAllsvenskan.

As a player, Tangnes spent his career in Rögle BK, Gislaveds SK, Lillehammer IK and Jonstorps IF.
