= Albin Sundsvik =

Swedish ice hockey player (born 2001)

- Born: 27 April 2001 (age 25) Stockholm, Sweden
- Height: 6 ft 2 in (188 cm)
- Weight: 187 lb (85 kg; 13 st 5 lb)
- Position: Centre
- Shoots: Left
- SHL team Former teams: Rögle BK; Skellefteå AIK
- NHL draft: 160th overall, 2020; Anaheim Ducks
- Playing career: 2019–present

Albin Sundsvik (born April 27, 2001) is a Swedish professional ice hockey centre who currently plays for Rögle BK of the Swedish Hockey League (SHL). Sundsvik was drafted by the Anaheim Ducks in the sixth round of the 2020 NHL entry draft with the 160th overall pick.

Sundsvik played five seasons in the SHL with Skellefteå AIK before signing an initial two-year contract with Rögle BK on 28 April 2023.

== Career statistics ==
=== Regular season and playoffs ===
			Regular season					Playoffs
Season	Team	League	GP	G	A	Pts	PIM	GP	G	A	Pts	PIM
2017–18	Skellefteå AIK	J20	22	3	3	6	8	—	—	—	—	—
2018–19	Skellefteå AIK	J20	42	17	24	41	32	—	—	—	—	—
2018–19	Skellefteå AIK	SHL	12	1	0	1	0	—	—	—	—	—
2019–20	Skellefteå AIK	J20	19	13	9	22	8	—	—	—	—	—
2019–20	Skellefteå AIK	SHL	38	3	1	4	2	—	—	—	—	—
2020–21	Skellefteå AIK	SHL	45	6	8	14	10	12	0	0	0	2
2021–22	Skellefteå AIK	SHL	47	5	4	9	16	6	0	0	0	2
2022–23	Skellefteå AIK	SHL	52	3	8	11	8	17	3	0	3	4
2023–24	Rögle BK	SHL	52	10	6	16	8	15	3	1	4	2
2024–25	Rögle BK	SHL	45	11	11	22	10	2	0	0	0	0
2025–26	Rögle BK	SHL	52	6	11	17	10	17	5	5	10	8
SHL totals			343	45	49	94	64	69	11	6	17	18

Medal record

Representing Sweden

Ice hockey

World U18 Championships
Gold medal – first place	2019 Sweden	

=== International ===
Year	Team	Event	Result	GP	G	A	Pts	PIM
2017	Sweden	U17	8th	5	0	1	1	17
2019	Sweden	U18	1st place, gold medalist(s)	7	0	0	0	6
2021	Sweden	WJC	5th	5	1	2	3	0
Junior totals				17	1	3	4	23
