= Pontus Johansson (ice hockey, born 2001) =

Swedish ice hockey player (born 2001)

- Born: October 23, 2001 (age 24) Stockholm, Sweden
- Height: 6 ft 1 in (185 cm)
- Weight: 185 lb (84 kg; 13 st 3 lb)
- Position: Defence
- Shoots: Left
- SHL team Former teams: Skellefteå AIK; Djurgårdens IF; Frölunda HC
- NHL draft: Undrafted
- Playing career: 2021–present

Pontus Johansson (born 23 October 2001) is a Swedish ice hockey player who currently plays for Skellefteå AIK of the Swedish Hockey League (SHL).
