= Jakob Johansson (ice hockey) =

Swedish ice hockey player (born 1979)

- Born: January 3, 1979 (age 47) Glimåkra, SWE
- Height: 6 ft 0 in (183 cm)
- Weight: 187 lb (85 kg; 13 st 5 lb)
- Position: Centre
- Shot: Left
- Played for: Rögle BK; Brynäs IF
- Playing career: 1997–2014

Jakob Johansson (born January 3, 1979) is a Swedish professional ice hockey player presently with the Rögle BK team in the Swedish Elitserien league.

== Career statistics ==
			Regular season					Playoffs
Season	Team	League	GP	G	A	Pts	PIM	GP	G	A	Pts	PIM
1994–95	Glimma HK J18	J18 Div.1	—	—	—	—	—	—	—	—	—	—
1995–96	Rögle BK J18	J18 Elit	—	—	—	—	—	—	—	—	—	—
1995–96	Rögle BK J20	J20 SuperElit	1	0	0	0	0	—	—	—	—	—
1996–97	Rögle BK J20	J20 SuperElit	30	16	13	29	—	—	—	—	—	—
1996–97	Rögle BK	Division 1	—	—	—	—	—	4	0	0	0	0
1997–98	Rögle BK	Division 1	32	15	4	19	32	4	2	0	2	0
1998–99	Rögle BK	Division 1	38	16	18	34	48	5	2	2	4	2
1999–00	Rögle BK	Allsvenskan	45	13	13	26	40	3	2	0	2	0
2000–01	Rögle BK	Allsvenskan	22	8	6	14	14	—	—	—	—	—
2001–02	Rögle BK	Allsvenskan	40	13	22	35	30	—	—	—	—	—
2002–03	Rögle BK	Allsvenskan	42	12	23	35	50	9	2	3	5	8
2003–04	Brynäs IF	Elitserien	50	7	6	13	34	—	—	—	—	—
2004–05	Brynäs IF	Elitserien	50	3	9	12	26	—	—	—	—	—
2005–06	Rögle BK	HockeyAllsvenskan	43	10	20	30	66	10	0	8	8	16
2006–07	Rögle BK	HockeyAllsvenskan	45	9	36	45	38	10	1	5	6	8
2007–08	Rögle BK	HockeyAllsvenskan	45	12	41	53	87	10	3	9	12	8
2008–09	Rögle BK	Elitserien	53	9	24	33	55	—	—	—	—	—
2009–10	Rögle BK	Elitserien	55	10	15	25	24	—	—	—	—	—
2010–11	Rögle BK	HockeyAllsvenskan	52	9	27	36	36	10	2	5	7	10
2011–12	Rögle BK	HockeyAllsvenskan	44	9	21	30	32	10	1	3	4	4
2012–13	Rögle BK	Elitserien	55	5	10	15	49	—	—	—	—	—
2013–14	Rögle BK	HockeyAllsvenskan	49	8	21	29	48	16	2	11	13	8
Elitserien totals			263	34	64	98	188	—	—	—	—	—
HockeyAllsvenskan totals			278	57	166	223	307	66	9	41	50	54
Allsvenskan totals			149	46	64	110	134	12	4	3	7	8
