= Linus Sandin =

Swedish ice hockey player

- Born: 19 May 1996 (age 30) Uppsala, Sweden
- Height: 6 ft 1 in (185 cm)
- Weight: 209 lb (95 kg; 14 st 13 lb)
- Position: Right wing
- Shoots: Right
- SHL team Former teams: Rögle BK; HV71; Philadelphia Flyers
- NHL draft: Undrafted
- Playing career: 2015–present

Linus Sandin (born 19 May 1996) is a Swedish professional ice hockey player for Rögle BK of the Swedish Hockey League (SHL).

== Playing career ==
Undrafted, Sandin signed a one-year, entry-level contract as a free agent with the Philadelphia Flyers on 29 April 2020. On 7 August, Sandin was returned on loan to former Swedish club HV71 to begin the 2020–21 season, until the commencement of the delayed North American season. On 14 June 2021, Sandin signed a one-year contract extension with the Flyers.

Unable to make the Flyers opening night roster for the 2022–23 season, Sandin sought and was mutually released from the remaining year of his contract with the Flyers on 14 October 2022. In returning to his native Sweden, he was immediately announced to have signed a three-year contract with original club, Rögle BK of the SHL.

== Personal life ==
Sandin has a younger brother Rasmus Sandin who is a player for the Washington Capitals of the National Hockey League (NHL).

== Career statistics ==
			Regular season					Playoffs
Season	Team	League	GP	G	A	Pts	PIM	GP	G	A	Pts	PIM
2012–13	Modo Hockey	J20	2	0	0	0	0	—	—	—	—	—
2013–14	Modo Hockey	J20	7	0	1	1	6	—	—	—	—	—
2014–15	Modo Hockey	J20	37	24	23	47	70	5	3	2	5	2
2015–16	Mora IK	Allsv	49	7	12	19	20	5	1	0	1	0
2015–16	Modo Hockey	J20	—	—	—	—	—	1	0	1	1	2
2016–17	Almtuna IS	Allsv	51	13	18	31	20	5	0	3	3	2
2017–18	Rögle BK	SHL	42	3	4	7	4	—	—	—	—	—
2018–19	Rögle BK	SHL	50	16	7	23	16	2	0	0	0	0
2019–20	HV71	SHL	51	19	17	36	14	—	—	—	—	—
2020–21	HV71	SHL	20	4	6	10	12	—	—	—	—	—
2020–21	Lehigh Valley Phantoms	AHL	26	6	4	10	6	—	—	—	—	—
2021–22	Lehigh Valley Phantoms	AHL	36	8	12	20	16	—	—	—	—	—
2021–22	Philadelphia Flyers	NHL	1	0	0	0	0	—	—	—	—	—
2022–23	Rögle BK	SHL	43	8	16	24	8	9	3	1	4	2
2023–24	Rögle BK	SHL	50	16	13	29	12	15	5	5	10	4
2024–25	Rögle BK	SHL	49	10	12	22	12	2	0	0	0	2
SHL totals			305	76	75	151	78	28	8	6	14	8
NHL totals			1	0	0	0	0	—	—	—	—	—
