= Anton Bengtsson =

Swedish professional ice hockey forward

- Born: 13 May 1993 (age 33) Karlstad, Sweden
- Height: 6 ft 0 in (183 cm)
- Weight: 176 lb (80 kg; 12 st 8 lb)
- Position: Forward
- Shoots: Left
- SHL team Former teams: Rögle BK; HV71
- National team: Sweden
- Playing career: 2011–present

Anton Bengtsson (born 13 May 1993) is a Swedish professional ice hockey forward currently playing with Rögle BK in the Swedish Hockey League (SHL).

== Playing career ==
Bengtsson played two seasons in the J20 SuperElit with HV71 before he made his Elitserien debut with the senior squad during the 2012–13 Elitserien season.

On 11 April 2019, Bengtsson left HV71 after seven seasons to sign as a free agent to a two-year contract with fellow SHL club, Rögle BK.

Anton Bengtsson
Medal record

Representing Sweden

Men's ice hockey

World Championships
Bronze medal – third place	2025 Sweden/Denmark	

== Career statistics ==
=== Regular season and playoffs ===
			Regular season					Playoffs
Season	Team	League	GP	G	A	Pts	PIM	GP	G	A	Pts	PIM
2010–11	Nässjö HC	Div.2	30	4	6	10	6	—	—	—	—	—
2011–12	HV71	J20	39	8	17	25	8	6	1	1	2	4
2012–13	HV71	J20	11	3	6	9	4	3	2	2	4	2
2012–13	HV71	SEL	37	2	3	5	10	5	1	0	1	0
2013–14	HV71	SHL	51	2	5	7	6	8	1	0	1	2
2014–15	HV71	SHL	52	13	6	19	4	6	1	0	1	2
2015–16	HV71	SHL	50	7	6	13	14	6	0	3	3	0
2016–17	HV71	SHL	32	5	3	8	8	16	2	6	8	4
2017–18	HV71	SHL	52	9	8	17	18	2	0	0	0	0
2018–19	HV71	SHL	50	7	9	16	14	8	3	2	5	4
2019–20	Rögle BK	SHL	52	5	7	12	14	—	—	—	—	—
2020–21	Rögle BK	SHL	48	13	5	18	8	14	3	2	5	0
2021–22	Rögle BK	SHL	49	20	19	39	10	13	5	1	6	6
2022–23	Rögle BK	SHL	48	6	9	15	8	9	2	0	2	0
2023–24	Rögle BK	SHL	49	8	12	20	6	14	2	3	5	4
2024–25	Rögle BK	SHL	46	7	17	24	4	1	0	0	0	0
SHL totals			616	104	109	213	124	102	20	17	37	22

=== International ===
Year	Team	Event	Result	GP	G	A	Pts	PIM
2022	Sweden	WC	6th	8	3	2	5	4
2025	Sweden	WC	3rd place, bronze medalist(s)	8	1	1	2	0
Senior totals				16	4	3	7	4

== Awards and honours ==
Award	Year
SHL
Le Mat Trophy (HV71)	2017
