= Filip Cederqvist =

Swedish ice hockey player (born 2000)

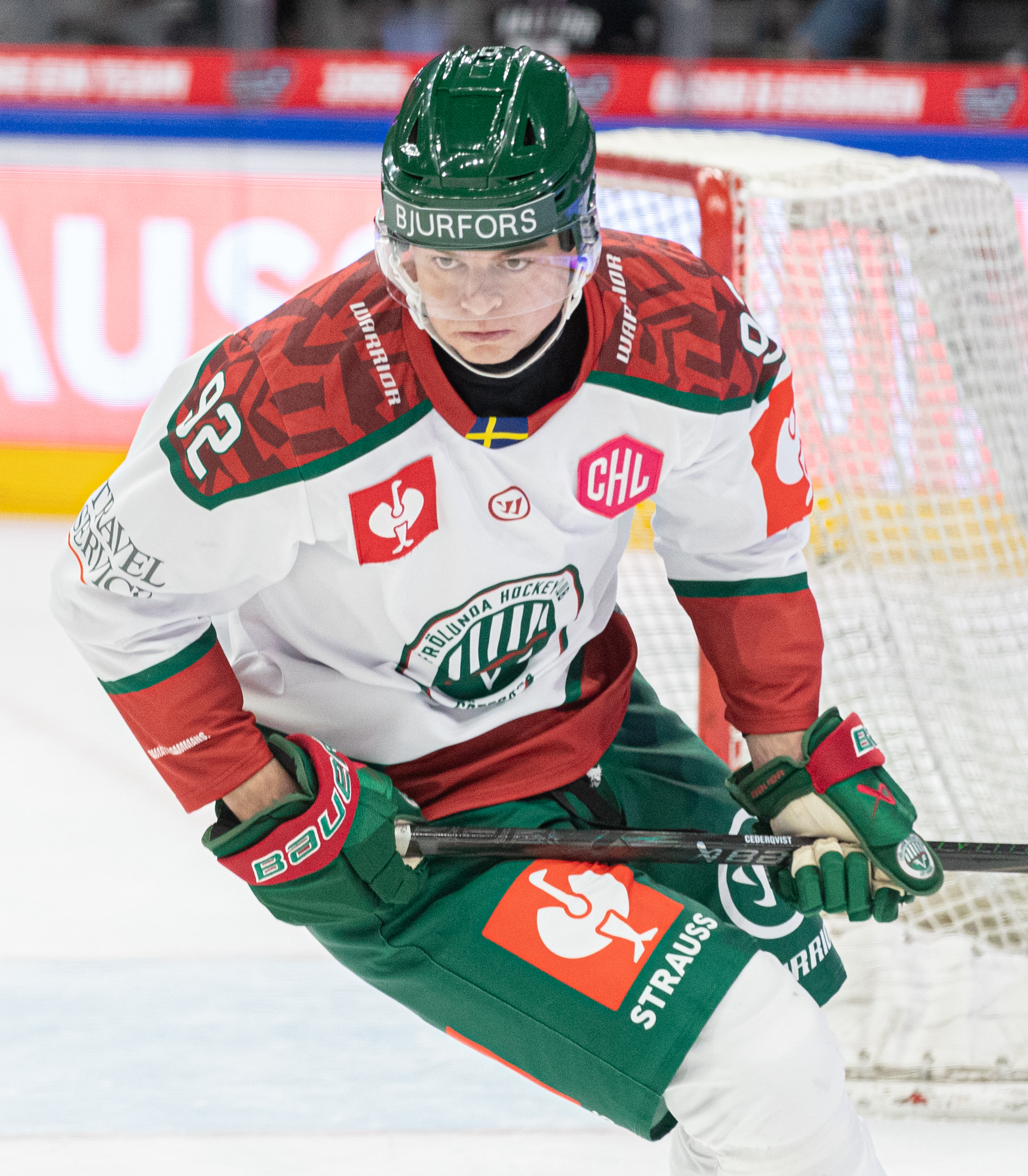
- Cederqvist in 2025
- Born: 23 August 2000 (age 25) Skara, Sweden
- Height: 6 ft 3 in (191 cm)
- Weight: 196 lb (89 kg; 14 st 0 lb)
- Position: Left wing
- Shoots: Left
- SHL team Former teams: Frölunda HC; Växjö Lakers; HV71; Djurgårdens IF; Rochester Americans; Laval Rocket
- NHL draft: 143rd overall, 2019; Buffalo Sabres
- Playing career: 2018–present

Filip Cederqvist (born 23 August 2000) is a Swedish professional ice hockey winger for Frölunda HC of the Swedish Hockey League (SHL). He was selected in the fifth round, 143rd overall, by the Buffalo Sabres of the National Hockey League (NHL) in the 2019 NHL entry draft.

== Playing career ==
Cederqvist made his Swedish Hockey League (SHL) debut for the Växjö Lakers during the 2018-19 season, where he played 33 regular season games, scoring four goals and four assists for eight points.

In his second SHL season with the Lakers in 2019–20, Cederqvist was unable to build on his rookie campaign, collecting just one goal and one assist in 30 games, while enduring loan stints in the HockeyAllsvenskan with Almtuna IS and BIK Karlskoga.

Out of contract with Växjö in the off-season, Cederqvist left the SHL club, securing a one-year contract with HockeyAllsvenskan club, Tingsryds AIF, on 5 June 2020.

Following a successful season with Tingsryds, Cederqvist returned to the SHL, agreeing to a one-year contract with Djurgårdens IF on 19 April 2021. In the following 2021–22 season, Cederqvist enjoyed a breakout season, recording career highs with 14 goals, 18 assists and 32 points in 49 regular season games.

Unable to prevent Djurgårdens IF from suffering relegation to the HockeyAllsvenskan, Cederqvist was signed by draft club, the Buffalo Sabres, in agreeing to a two-year, entry-level contract on 14 June 2022. In his first season of play in North America for the 2022–23 season, Cedrqvist registered nine goals and 11 assists for 20 points in 55 regular-season games with Rochester. He likewise notched three assists in eight games during the Calder Cup Playoffs.

On 11 January 2024, Cederqvist was traded by the Sabres to the Montreal Canadiens in exchange for future considerations. Assigned to the Canadiens American Hockey League (AHL) affiliate, the Laval Rocket, Cederqvist played out the remainder of the 2023–24 season in the AHL, posting 7 points through 34 regular season appearances.

As a pending restricted free agent, Cederqvist left the Canadiens organization by signing a three-year contract to return to Sweden with Frölunda HC of the SHL on 3 May 2024.

== Career statistics ==
			Regular season					Playoffs
Season	Team	League	GP	G	A	Pts	PIM	GP	G	A	Pts	PIM
2016–17	VIK Västerås HK	J20	23	2	1	3	2	—	—	—	—	—
2017–18	Växjö Lakers	J20	37	5	4	9	4	8	2	1	3	4
2018–19	Växjö Lakers	J20	26	14	18	32	12	—	—	—	—	—
2018–19	Växjö Lakers	SHL	33	4	4	8	27	6	1	0	1	4
2019–20	Växjö Lakers	J20	3	1	1	2	0	—	—	—	—	—
2019–20	Växjö Lakers	SHL	30	1	1	2	2	—	—	—	—	—
2019–20	Almtuna IS	Allsv	5	0	0	0	2	—	—	—	—	—
2019–20	BIK Karlskoga	Allsv	8	1	3	4	0	—	—	—	—	—
2020–21	Tingsryds AIF	Allsv	51	9	27	36	10	2	0	0	0	0
2020–21	HV71	SHL	3	0	0	0	0	—	—	—	—	—
2021–22	Djurgårdens IF	SHL	49	14	18	32	10	—	—	—	—	—
2022–23	Rochester Americans	AHL	55	9	11	20	31	8	0	3	3	2
2023–24	Rochester Americans	AHL	19	1	3	4	11	—	—	—	—	—
2023–24	Laval Rocket	AHL	34	4	3	7	11	—	—	—	—	—
2024–25	Frölunda HC	SHL	50	14	14	28	12	12	0	4	4	6
SHL totals			165	33	37	70	51	18	1	4	5	10
