= Victor Stjernborg =

Swedish ice hockey player (born 2003)

- Born: May 22, 2003 (age 22) Malmö, Sweden
- Height: 5 ft 10 in (178 cm)
- Weight: 203 lb (92 kg; 14 st 7 lb)
- Position: Forward
- Shoots: Left
- SHL team Former teams: Skellefteå AIK; Växjö Lakers
- NHL draft: 108th overall, 2021; Chicago Blackhawks
- Playing career: 2021–present

Victor Stjernborg (born May 22, 2003) is a Swedish ice hockey forward for Skellefteå AIK of the SHL. Stjernborg was drafted by the Chicago Blackhawks in the fourth round of the 2021 NHL entry draft with the 108th pick in the draft.

== Playing career ==
Stjernborg made his professional debut in the SHL, with the Växjö Lakers in the 2020–21 season, helping the club claim the Le Mat Trophy, in posting 1 assist through 10 playoff appearances.

Following five seasons with the Lakers, Stjernborg left out of contract to sign a two-year contract with rival SHL club, Skellefteå AIK, on 22 April 2025.

== Career statistics ==
=== Regular season and playoffs ===
			Regular season					Playoffs
Season	Team	League	GP	G	A	Pts	PIM	GP	G	A	Pts	PIM
2018–19	Växjö Lakers	J20	17	1	2	3	4	2	0	0	0	0
2019–20	Växjö Lakers	J20	40	11	9	20	16	—	—	—	—	—
2020–21	Växjö Lakers	J20	19	9	8	17	12	—	—	—	—	—
2020–21	Växjö Lakers	SHL	30	2	2	4	4	10	0	1	1	0
2021–22	Växjö Lakers	SHL	15	0	2	2	29	2	0	0	0	0
2021–22	IF Troja-Ljungby	Allsv	7	5	6	11	2	—	—	—	—	—
2022–23	Växjö Lakers	SHL	42	1	7	8	0	18	3	4	7	2
2022–23	Växjö Lakers	J20	2	0	2	2	0	—	—	—	—	—
2023–24	Växjö Lakers	SHL	46	6	12	18	20	8	0	1	1	6
2024–25	Växjö Lakers	SHL	37	3	6	9	2	3	0	0	0	2
SHL totals			170	12	29	41	55	41	3	6	9	10

Medal record

Representing Sweden

Ice hockey

World Junior Championships
Bronze medal – third place	2022 Canada	

=== International ===
Year	Team	Event	Result	GP	G	A	Pts	PIM
2019	Sweden	U17	6th	5	2	2	4	0
2022	Sweden	WJC	3rd place, bronze medalist(s)	7	0	0	0	2
2023	Sweden	WJC	4th	7	1	1	2	2
Junior totals				19	3	3	6	4

== Awards and honours ==
Award	Year
SHL
Le Mat Trophy (Växjö Lakers)	2021, 2023
