= 2023–24 National League (ice hockey) season =

2023–24 National League season
- League: National League
- Sport: Ice hockey
- Duration: September 13, 2023 – March 4, 2024
- Games: 52
- Teams: 14

Regular season
- Best record: ZSC Lions
- Runners-up: Fribourg-Gottéron
- Season MVP: Calvin Thürkauf (HC Lugano)
- Top scorer: Marcus Sörensen (Fribourg-Gottéron)

Playoffs

Swiss champion NL
- Champions: ZSC Lions
- Runners-up: Lausanne HC

National League seasons
- ← 2022–23 2024–25 →

The 2023–24 National League season is the 86th season of Swiss professional ice hockey and the seventh season as the National League (NL).

Genève-Servette HC is the defending champion.

== Teams ==
NL teams for the 2023–24 season

Team	City	Arena	Capacity
HC Ajoie	Porrentruy	Raiffeisen Arena	5,078
HC Ambrì-Piotta	Ambrì	Gottardo Arena	6,775
SC Bern	Bern	PostFinance Arena	17,031
EHC Biel	Biel/Bienne	Tissot Arena	6,562
HC Davos	Davos	Eisstadion Davos	6,547
Fribourg-Gottéron	Fribourg	BCF Arena	9,075
Genève-Servette HC	Geneva	Patinoire des Vernets	7,135
EHC Kloten	Kloten	Stimo Arena	7,624
Lausanne HC	Lausanne	Vaudoise Aréna	9,600
HC Lugano	Lugano	Cornèr Arena	7,800
SCL Tigers	Langnau im Emmental	Ilfis Stadium	6,000
SC Rapperswil-Jona Lakers	Rapperswil	St. Galler Kantonalbank Arena	6,100
ZSC Lions	Zürich	Swiss Life Arena	12,000
EV Zug	Zug	Bossard Arena	7,200

== Regular season ==
=== Standings ===
Pos	Team	Pld	W	OTW	OTL	L	GF	GA	GD	Pts	Qualification
1	ZSC Lions	52	31	4	8	9	167	110	+57	109	Advance to Playoffs
2	Fribourg-Gottéron	52	28	7	4	13	175	124	+51	102	Advance to Playoffs
3	Lausanne HC	52	25	5	6	16	158	126	+32	91	Advance to Playoffs
4	EV Zug	52	21	9	6	16	161	135	+26	87	Advance to Playoffs
5	SC Bern	52	20	8	9	15	145	144	+1	85	Advance to Playoffs
6	HC Davos	52	23	5	6	18	156	126	+30	85	Advance to Playoffs
7	HC Lugano	52	23	4	2	23	162	151	+11	79	Advance to Play-In
8	HC Ambrì-Piotta	52	20	8	3	21	153	151	+2	79	Advance to Play-In
9	EHC Biel	52	16	9	8	19	139	140	−1	74	Advance to Play-In
10	Genève-Servette HC	52	19	6	5	22	140	155	−15	74	Advance to Play-In
11	SCL Tigers	52	17	6	8	21	123	159	−36	71	
12	SC Rapperswil-Jona Lakers	52	18	3	5	26	126	151	−25	65	
13	EHC Kloten	52	12	5	6	29	108	177	−69	52	Advance to Playout
14	HC Ajoie	52	8	4	7	33	111	175	−64	39	Advance to Playout

Rules for classification: 1) points per game 2) greater number of games played 3) greater number of away games played 4) head-to-head points

=== Statistics ===
==== Scoring leaders ====
The following shows the top ten players leading the league in points. If two or more skaters are tied (i.e. same number of points, goals and played games), all of the tied skaters are shown.

Player	Team	GP	G	A	Pts	+/–	PIM
(Sweden) Marcus Sörensen	Fribourg-Gottéron	52	31	32	63	+30	30
(Switzerland) Calvin Thürkauf	HC Lugano	52	28	32	60	+26	34
(Germany) Dominik Kahun	SC Bern	47	15	35	50	+5	6
(Czech Republic) Michael Spacek	HC Ambrì-Piotta	48	17	33	50	+11	10
(Canada) Michael Joly	HC Lugano	48	20	28	48	+22	10
(Sweden) Lucas Wallmark	Fribourg-Gottéron	49	20	27	47	+23	43
(Switzerland) Denis Malgin	ZSC Lions	48	18	29	46	+14	26
(Canada) Daniel Carr	HC Lugano	39	17	29	46	+21	63
(Finland) Sakari Manninen	Genève-Servette HC	50	18	23	41	-7	26
(Finland) Aleksi Saarela	SC Langnau	50	18	23	41	-13	8

==== Leading goaltenders ====
The following shows the top five goaltenders who led the league in goals against average, provided that they have played at least 40% of their team's minutes, at the conclusion of the regular season.

Player	Team(s)	GP	TOI	GA	Sv%	GAA
(Czech Republic) Simon Hrubec	ZSC Lions	31	1879:53	61	92.96	1.95
(Switzerland) Reto Berra	Fribourg-Gottéron	33	1993:41	65	92.85	1.96
(Switzerland) Luca Hollenstein	EV Zug	18	1090:49	37	92.66	2.04
(Switzerland) Sandro Aeschlimann	HC Davos	26	1567:57	54	92.62	2.07
(Switzerland) Leonardo Genoni	EV Zug	21	1266:15	44	92.68	2.08

== Postseason ==
=== Play-In ===
==== Bracket ====
Round 1
7	HC Lugano	4	3
8	HC Ambrì-Piotta	4	1
9	EHC Bienne	3	2
10	Genève-Servette HC	2	2

Round 2
8	HC Ambrì-Piotta	1	2
9	EHC Bienne	1	4

Final Seeds
HC Lugano	No. 7 Seed
EHC Bienne	No. 8 Seed

==== Rules ====
The teams ranked 7th to 10th at the end of the National League regular season compete in the play-in, with a view to obtaining one of the two qualifying places for the playoffs. The 7th faces the 8th and the 9th faces the 10th in a series of 2 matches with the higher ranked team starting away. The winner of the series is the one with the most points. In the event of a tie at the end of the two matches, the teams decide on overtime. This translates as follows: a team wins 1-0 the first match and loses 8-1 the second match, can qualify thanks to an overtime goal, with a goal difference of -5. If the higher ranked team starts away, it is to have the advantage in the decisive match.

The winner of the match between the 7th and 8th qualifies for the playoffs and faces the 2nd in the general ranking. The loser will face the winner of the match between the 9th and the 10th in a second round. The winner of this confrontation qualifies for the playoffs and faces the winner of the regular season. The two eliminated teams see their seasons end.

==== Round 1 ====
===== (7) HC Lugano vs (8) HC Ambrì-Piotta =====
HC Ambrì-Piotta	4-4	HC Lugano	Gottardo Arena, Ambrì	Recap
8:08 - Lilja (Fohrler); 8:33 - Heed (Kostner, Douay); 12:08 - Kneubuehler (Fohrler, Heim)	First period	No scoring
25:08 - Pestoni (Heed, Bürgler) (PP1)	Second period	Fazzini (Mi. Müller, Verboon) - 26:18
No scoring	Third period	Ma. Müller (Mi. Müller, Arcobello) (SH1) - 41:17; Joly (Thürkauf, Mi. Müller) - 53:23; Alatalo (Thürkauf, J. Peltonen) - 54:54
Juvonen ( 20 saves / 24 shots )	Goalie stats	Mikko Koskinen ( 28 saves / 32 shots )

HC Lugano	3-1	HC Ambrì-Piotta	Cornèr Arena, HC Lugano	Recap
Alatalo (Arcobello, Fazzini) - 19:46	First period	No scoring
No scoring	Second period	No scoring
Carr - 54:26; Ruotsalainen (Mi. Müller) (EN) - 59:37	Third period	58:29 - Bürgler (Heed, Virtanen) (PP1)
Mikko Koskinen ( 33 saves / 34 shots )	Goalie stats	Juvonen ( 18 saves / 20 shots )

HC Lugano won with 4 pts

===== (9) EHC Biel vs (10) Genève-Servette HC =====
Genève-Servette HC	3-2	EHC Biel	Patinoire des Vernets, Genève	Recap
10:48 - Lennström (Miranda, Winnik)	First period	No scoring
22:18 - Miranda (Jooris, Winnik)	Second period	Haas (Lööv, Bärtschi) - 20:17; Forster (Tanner) - 29:17
No scoring	Third period	Hofer (Lööv, Bärtschi) - 55:52
Gauthier Descloux ( 29 saves / 32 shots )	Goalie stats	Harri Säteri ( 28 saves / 30 shots )

EHC Biel	2-2	Genève-Servette HC	Tissot Arena, Biel/Bienne	Recap
Hofer (Haas, Bärtschi) - 19:39	First period	0:36 - Manninen (Berni, Miranda); 12:44 - Hartikainen (Manninen, Filppula) (PP2)
Sallinen (Kessler, Heponiemi) (PP1) - 27:38	Second period	No scoring
No scoring	Third period	No scoring
Harri Säteri ( 35 saves / 37 shots )	Goalie stats	Robert Mayer (ice hockey) ( 18 saves / 20 shots )

EHC Biel won with 4 pts

==== Round 2 ====
===== (8) HC Ambrì-Piotta vs (9) EHC Bienne =====
2	EHC Biel	1-1	HC Ambrì-Piotta	Tissot Arena, Biel/Bienne	Recap
No scoring		First period	Landry (Virtanen, Lilja) - 2:56
29:08 - Kessler (Brunner, Rathgeb)		Second period	No scoring
No scoring		Third period	No scoring
Harri Säteri ( 23 saves / 24 shots )		Goalie stats	Conz ( 32 saves / 33 shots )

1	HC Ambrì-Piotta	2-4	EHC Biel	Gottardo Arena, Ambrì	Recap
No scoring		First period	8:36 - Kessler (Bachofner, Rathgeb); 9:17 - Schläpfer (Sallinen, Rajala)
Landry (Heed, Z. Dotti) (SH1) - 24:11		Second period	33:29 - Haas (Yakovenko, Hofer)
Dauphin (Heed, De Luca) - 53:09		Third period	59:17 - Künzle (Sallinen, Forster) (EN)
Juvonen ( 24 saves / 27 shots )		Goalie stats	Harri Säteri ( 19 saves / 21 shots )

EHC Biel won with 4 pts

=== Playoffs ===
==== Bracket ====
Quarterfinals (best-of-7)
1	ZSC Lions	4
9	EHC Biel	0
4	EV Zug	4
5	SC Bern	3
2	HC Fribourg-Gottéron	4
7	HC Lugano	3
3	Lausanne HC	4
6	HC Davos	3

Semifinals (best-of-7)
1	ZSC Lions	4
4	EV Zug	0
2	HC Fribourg-Gottéron	1
3	Lausanne HC	4

Finals (best-of-7)
1	ZSC Lions	4
3	Lausanne HC	3

==== Quarter-Finals ====
===== (1) ZSC Lions vs (9) EHC Biel =====
16 March	ZSC Lions	4-3	EHC Biel	Swiss Life Arena, Zürich	Recap
Grant (Andrighetto, Balcers) (PP1) - 9:11		First period	No scoring
Riedi (C. Baltisberger, Geering) - 25:59		Second period	24:10 - Heponiemi (Olofsson, Rathgeb) (PP1); 35:34 - Rajala (Sallinen, Schläpfer)
Malgin (Andrighetto, Kukan) (PP1) - 45:07; Malgin (Balcers, Andrighetto) - 47:25		Third period	43:52 - Cunti (Hofer, Burren)
Šimon Hrubec ( 31 saves / 34 shots )		Goalie stats	Joren van Pottelberghe ( 32 saves / 36 shots )

18 March	EHC Biel	1-3	ZSC Lions	Tissot Arena, Biel/Bienne	Recap
No scoring		First period	Kukan (Balcers, Malgin) - 10:45
No scoring		Second period	No scoring
43:16 - Bärtschi (Grossmann, Yakovenko)		Third period	Balcers (Grant, Andrighetto) (PP1) - 51:11; Frödén (Hollenstein) - 52:11
Harri Säteri ( 27 saves / 30 shots )		Goalie stats	Šimon Hrubec ( 21 saves / 22 shots )

20 March	ZSC Lions	3-2	2OT	EHC Biel	Swiss Life Arena, Zürich	Recap
No scoring		First period		16:42 - Lööv
Weber (Malgin, Kukan) - 34:23		Second period		No scoring
Hollenstein (Weber, Geering) - 59:09		Third period		54:48 - Brunner (Cunti, Künzle)
Zehnder (Geering, Sigrist) - 87:03		Second overtime period		No scoring
Šimon Hrubec ( 29 saves / 31 shots )		Goalie stats		Harri Säteri ( 41 saves / 44 shots )

22 March	EHC Biel	0-4	ZSC Lions	Tissot Arena, Biel/Bienne	Recap
No scoring		First period	Grant (Andrighetto, Kukan) (PP1) - 3:50; Grant (Hollenstein, Weber) - 14:05
No scoring		Second period	No scoring
No scoring		Third period	Hollenstein (Frödén) - 44:23; Grant (EN) - 59:28
Harri Säteri ( 23 saves / 26 shots )		Goalie stats	Šimon Hrubec ( 25 saves / 25 shots )

ZSC Lions won the series 4–0

===== (2) HC Fribourg-Gottéron vs (7) HC Lugano =====
16 March	HC Fribourg-Gottéron	6-2	HC Lugano	BCF Arena, Fribourg	Recap
Streule (DiDomenico, de la Rose) - 14:19; Wallmark (Mottet) - 19:46		First period	19:27 - Fazzini (Quenneville, Alatalo)
Sörensen (Mottet) - 27:56; Wallmark (Sörensen, DiDomenico) (PP1) - 32:48		Second period	No scoring
Sörensen (Wallmark, Mottet) - 47:09; Walser (Jörg) (SH1, EN) - 57:02		Third period	51:41 - Ma. Müller (Mi. Müller, Quenneville)
Reto Berra ( 16 saves / 18 shots )		Goalie stats	Mikko Koskinen ( 24 saves / 29 shots )

18 March	HC Lugano	1-4	HC Fribourg-Gottéron	Cornèr Arena, Lugano	Recap
No scoring		First period	No scoring
No scoring		Second period	Wallmark (Sörensen, Gunderson) (PP1) - 23:32; Schmid (DiDomenico) - 30:58; Schmid (Borgman, Marchon) (SH1) - 35:19
59:42 - Joly (Arcobello, Alatalo) (PP1)		Third period	Marchon (Diaz, Walser) (EN) - 59:47
Mikko Koskinen ( 18 saves / 21 shots )		Goalie stats	Reto Berra ( 22 saves / 23 shots )

20 March	HC Fribourg-Gottéron	1-2	OT	HC Lugano	BCF Arena, Fribourg	Recap
No scoring		First period		9:43 - Fazzini (PP1)
DiDomenico (Sörensen, Wallmark) (PP1) - 28:30		Second period		No scoring
No scoring		Third period		No scoring
No scoring		First overtime period		62:49 - Ruotsalainen (Zanetti, Wolf)
Reto Berra ( 26 saves / 28 shots )		Goalie stats		Niklas Schlegel ( 38 saves / 39 shots )

22 March	HC Lugano	3-2	OT	HC Fribourg-Gottéron	Cornèr Arena, Lugano	Recap
6:42 - Carr (Thürkauf, Alatalo); 13:24 - Carr (Thürkauf, Alatalo) (PP1)		First period		17:50 - Borgman (Bertschy, de la Rose)
No scoring		Second period		No scoring
No scoring		Third period		50:43 - Gunderson (DiDomenico, Bertschy) (PP1)
No scoring		First overtime period		Carr (Joly, Arcobello) (PP1) - 60:33
Niklas Schlegel ( 24 saves / 26 shots )		Goalie stats		Reto Berra ( 30 saves / 33 shots )

24 March	HC Fribourg-Gottéron	1-0	HC Lugano	BCF Arena, Fribourg	Recap
No scoring		First period	No scoring
DiDomenico (Gunderson, Bertschy) (PP1) - 23:42		Second period	No scoring
No scoring		Third period	No scoring
Reto Berra ( 30 saves / 30 shots )		Goalie stats	Niklas Schlegel ( 28 saves / 29 shots )

26 March	HC Lugano	4-2	HC Fribourg-Gottéron	Cornèr Arena, Lugano	Recap
7:44 - Joly (Thürkauf, Carr) (PP1)		First period	No scoring
24:29 - Alatalo (Carr, Arcobello) (PP1); 25:36 - Patry (Zanetti)		Second period	Diaz (Walser) - 22:13; Mottet (Wallmark, Sörensen) - 31:04
59:43 - Mario Kempe (Thürkauf) (EN)		Third period	No scoring
Niklas Schlegel ( 22 saves / 24 shots )		Goalie stats	Reto Berra ( 25 saves / 28 shots )

28 March	HC Fribourg-Gottéron	4-2	HC Lugano	BCF Arena, Fribourg	Recap
Mottet (Sörensen, Jecker) - 17:35		First period	No scoring
Bertschy (Schmid, Jecker) - 21:37; DiDomenico (Gunderson, Sörensen) (PP1) - 30:28		Second period	24:28 - Carr (Thürkauf, Mi. Müller) (SH1); 39:26 - Thürkauf (Alatalo, Carr)
Bertschy (de la Rose) (EN) - 58:42		Third period	No scoring
Reto Berra ( 31 saves / 33 shots )		Goalie stats	Niklas Schlegel ( 26 saves / 29 shots )

HC Fribourg-Gottéron won the series 4–3

===== (3) Lausanne HC vs (6) HC Davos =====
17 March	Lausanne HC	2-3	2OT	HC Davos	Vaudoise Aréna, Lausanne	Recap
Glauser (Suomela, Genazzi) - 15:54		First period		6:45 - Bristedt (Rasmussen, Frehner)
No scoring		Second period		No scoring
Frick (Fuchs, Salomäki) - 50:01		Third period		51:10 - Mustonen (Bristedt, Nussbaumer) (PP1)
No scoring		Second overtime period		80:29 - D. Egli (Corvi, Stránský)
Connor Hughes ( 41 saves / 44 shots )		Goalie stats		Sandro Aeschlimann ( 47 saves / 49 shots )

19 March	HC Davos	2-3	Lausanne HC	Eisstadion Davos, Davos	Recap
7:42 - Näkyvä (Bristedt, Rasmussen)		First period	Raffl (Riat, Pilut) (PP1) - 7:02
37:15 - Bristedt (Rasmussen, Nussbaumer) (PP1)		Second period	Suomela (Djoos, Rochette) (PP1) - 31:43
No scoring		Third period	Jäger (Genazzi, Pilut) - 46:04
Sandro Aeschlimann ( 34 saves / 37 shots )		Goalie stats	Connor Hughes ( 20 saves / 22 shots )

21 March	Lausanne HC	3-2	HC Davos	Vaudoise Aréna, Lausanne	Recap
Glauser (Pilut, Raffl) (PP1) - 8:27; Frick (Suomela, Heldner) - 10:26		First period	No scoring
No scoring		Second period	37:53 - Wieser (Nordström)
Sekáč (Rochette) - 41:25		Third period	52:48 - Nussbaumer (Corvi)
Connor Hughes ( 15 saves / 17 shots )		Goalie stats	Sandro Aeschlimann ( 31 saves / 34 shots )

23 March	HC Davos	5-2	Lausanne HC	Eisstadion Davos, Davos	Recap
12:15 - Frehner (Nordström, Wieser); 13:37 - Stránský (Fora, Nussbaumer) (PP1)		First period	Salomäki (Riat, Fuchs) - 10:56
37:11 - C. Egli (D. Egli)		Second period	No scoring
49:12 - Ambühl (Fora, Mustonen) (PP1); 53:12 - Nussbaumer (Ambühl, C. Egli) (PP2)		Third period	Pilut (Riat, Fuchs) (PP1) - 56:55
Sandro Aeschlimann ( 34 saves / 36 shots )		Goalie stats	Connor Hughes ( 12 saves / 16 shots ) Kevin Pasche ( 5 saves / 6 shots )

25 March	Lausanne HC	0-1	HC Davos	Vaudoise Aréna, Lausanne	Recap
No scoring		First period	No scoring
No scoring		Second period	No scoring
No scoring		Third period	49:32 - Nussbaumer (Mustonen, Jung)
Connor Hughes ( 10 saves / 11 shots )		Goalie stats	Sandro Aeschlimann ( 37 saves / 37 shots )

27 March	HC Davos	2-5	Lausanne HC	Eisstadion Davos, Davos	Recap
12:55 - Bristedt (Corvi, D. Egli) (PP1)		First period	Suomela (Sekáč, Jäger) (PP1) - 6:26; Sekáč (Rochette, Suomela) - 9:13
No scoring		Second period	Suomela (Rochette, Genazzi) - 23:08; Suomela (Rochette, Pilut) - 26:28; Rochette (Sekáč) - 30:05
54:32 - Bristedt (PS)		Third period	No scoring
Sandro Aeschlimann ( 13 saves / 18 shots ) Gilles Senn ( 17 saves / 17 shots )		Goalie stats	Connor Hughes ( 25 saves / 27 shots )

30 March	Lausanne HC	3-0	HC Davos	Vaudoise Aréna, Lausanne	Recap
Fuchs (Pilut, Raffl) - 16:43		First period	No scoring
Heldner (Fuchs, Frick) - 21:12		Second period	No scoring
Raffl (Riat) (EN) - 56:53		Third period	No scoring
Connor Hughes ( 32 saves / 32 shots )		Goalie stats	Sandro Aeschlimann ( 31 saves / 33 shots )

Lausanne HC won the series 4–3

===== (4) EV Zug vs (5) SC Bern =====
17 March	EV Zug	3-4	SC Bern	Bossard Arena, Zug	Recap
No scoring		First period	2:16 - Nemeth (Untersander, Bader) (PP1)
Michaelis (Herzog) - 21:33; Martschini (Wingerli) - 27:59; Senteler (Wingerli, Bengtsson) - 38:11		Second period	No scoring
No scoring		Third period	43:27 - Loeffel (Ritzmann, Sablatnig); 52:51 - Kindschi (Sceviour); 56:24 - Scherwey (Bader, Sceviour)
Leonardo Genoni ( 27 saves / 31 shots )		Goalie stats	Adam Reideborn ( 25 saves / 28 shots )

19 March	SC Bern	1-4	EV Zug	PostFinance Arena, Bern	Recap
No scoring		First period	Simion (Martschini, Herzog) (PP1) - 10:24
20:48 - Luoto (Lehmann)		Second period	Eder (Leuenberger) - 29:59; Simion (Herzog, Kovář) - 30:57
No scoring		Third period	Schlumpf (Stadler, Suri) - 47:40
Adam Reideborn ( 21 saves / 25 shots )		Goalie stats	Leonardo Genoni ( 40 saves / 41 shots )

21 March	EV Zug	6-1	SC Bern	Bossard Arena, Zug	Recap
Bengtsson (Leuenberger, Stadler) - 2:29		First period	No scoring
Hansson (Michaelis, Eder) - 24:31; Simion (Martschini, Bengtsson) (PP1) - 26:41; Herzog (Leuenberger, Bengtsson) - 38:40		Second period	No scoring
L. Muggli (Eder, Biasca) - 45:18; Wingerli (Simion, Herzog) - 46:27		Third period	56:09 - Nemeth (Baumgartner, Luoto) (PP1)
Leonardo Genoni ( 19 saves / 20 shots )		Goalie stats	Adam Reideborn ( 7 saves / 10 shots ) Wüthrich ( 11 saves / 14 shots )

23 March	SC Bern	3-2	EV Zug	PostFinance Arena, Bern	Recap
16:33 - Sceviour (Bader, Honka) 18:56 - Moser (Bader, Kindschi)		First period	No scoring
No scoring		Second period	No scoring
50:46 - Schild (Kindschi)		Third period	Senteler (Martschini) - 49:34 Simion (PP1) - 53:16
Philip Wüthrich ( 18 saves / 20 shots )		Goalie stats	Leonardo Genoni ( 30 saves / 33 shots )

25 March	EV Zug	6-2	SC Bern	Bossard Arena, Zug	Recap
Schlumpf (Martschini, L. Muggli) - 6:55; Herzog (Simion, Michaelis) - 17:30		First period	No scoring
Martschini (Kovář, Wingerli) - 24:17; Michaelis (Bengtsson, Martschini) - 24:48		Second period	No scoring
Kovář (Wingerli, Sheen) (PP1) - 41:29 Wingerli (Senteler, Kovář) (PP1) - 56:16		Third period	46:25 - Kummer (Sablatnig, Schild); 54:39 - Scherwey (Lehmann, Honka)
Leonardo Genoni ( 34 saves / 36 shots )		Goalie stats	Philip Wüthrich ( 6 saves / 8 shots ) Reideborn ( 25 saves / 29 shots )

27 March	SC Bern	3-0	EV Zug	PostFinance Arena, Bern	Recap
19:31 - Sceviour (Kahun, Bader)		First period	No scoring
No scoring		Second period	No scoring
42:29 - Scherwey(Nemeth, Lehmann) (PP1); 57:54 - Luoto (Untersander) (EN)		Third period	No scoring
Philip Wüthrich ( 25 saves / 25 shots )		Goalie stats	Leonardo Genoni ( 30 saves / 32 shots )

30 March	EV Zug	3-0	SC Bern	Bossard Arena, Zug	Recap
Simion (Martschini, Herzog) (PP1) - 18:35		First period	No scoring
No scoring		Second period	No scoring
Herzog (Michaelis, Bengtsson) (PP1) - 51:34; Wingerli (Leuenberger, Geisser) (EN) - 57:45		Third period	No scoring
Leonardo Genoni ( 31 saves / 31 shots )		Goalie stats	Adam Reideborn ( 17 saves / 19 shots )

EV Zug won the series 4–3

==== Semi-Finals ====
===== (1) ZSC Lions vs (4) EV Zug =====
1 April	ZSC Lions	5-2	EV Zug	Swiss Life Arena, Zürich	Recap
No scoring		First period	14:39 - Hansson (Kovář, Wingerli) (PP1)
Balcers (Malgin, C. Baltisberger) - 31:27; Grant (Andrighetto) (PP1) - 34:16; Malgin (Andrighetto, Kukan) (PP1) - 35:56; Grant (Kukan, Andrighetto) (PP1) - 37:35		Second period	39:54 - Bengtsson (Senteler, Biasca)
Grant (Hollenstein, Geering) - 41:27		Third period	No scoring
Šimon Hrubec ( 19 saves / 21 shots )		Goalie stats	Leonardo Genoni ( 13 saves / 17 shots )

3 April	EV Zug	0-1	ZSC Lions	Bossard Arena, Zug	Recap
No scoring		First period	No scoring
No scoring		Second period	No scoring
No scoring		Third period	Andrighetto (Grant, Malgin) - 53:36
Leonardo Genoni ( 39 saves / 40 shots )		Goalie stats	Šimon Hrubec ( 35 saves / 35 shots )

6 April	ZSC Lions	5-2	EV Zug	Swiss Life Arena, Zürich	Recap
Lammikko (Lehtonen, Rohrer) (PP1) - 1:31		First period	No scoring
Marti (Bodenmann) - 24:32; Balcers (Andrighetto, Weber) - 39:32		Second period	37:34 - Hansson (Simion, Michaelis)
Rohrer (EN) - 58:55; Lammikko (Sigrist, Weber) (EN) - 59:31		Third period	58:18 - Herzog (Kovář, Martschini)
Šimon Hrubec ( 26 saves / 28 shots )		Goalie stats	Leonardo Genoni ( 32 saves / 35 shots )

8 April	EV Zug	0-2	ZSC Lions	Bossard Arena, Zug	Recap
No scoring		First period	No scoring
No scoring		Second period	21:49 - Grant (Frödén, Hollenstein); 33:45 - Malgin (Andrighetto, Kukan) (PP1)
No scoring		Third period	No scoring
Leonardo Genoni ( 24 saves / 26 shots )		Goalie stats	Šimon Hrubec ( 26 saves / 26 shots )

ZSC Lions won the series 4–0

===== (2) HC Fribourg-Gottéron vs (3) Lausanne HC =====
1 April	Fribourg-Gottéron	2-1	Lausanne HC	BCF Arena, Fribourg	Recap
No scoring		First period	7:55 - Pilut (Bozon, Jäger)
Gunderson (DiDomenico, Sörensen) (PP1) - 21:29		Second period	No scoring
Bykov (Dufner, Schmid) - 43:44		Third period	No scoring
Reto Berra ( 23 saves / 24 shots )		Goalie stats	Kevin Pasche ( 22 saves / 24 shots )

3 April	Lausanne HC	3-2	3OT	Fribourg-Gottéron	Vaudoise Aréna, Lausanne	Recap
=10:48 - Raffl (Djoos, Heldner) (SH1)		First period		No scoring
=24:05 - Sekáč (Jäger) (PP1)		Second period		Sörensen (Gunderson, Wallmark) (PP1) - 31:15 Gunderson (Sörensen, Bykov) - 35:43
No scoring		Third period		No scoring
106:44 - Fuchs (Kovacs)		Third overtime period		No scoring
Connor Hughes ( 47 saves / 49 shots )		Goalie stats		Reto Berra ( 54 saves / 57 shots )

6 April	Fribourg-Gottéron	0-2	Lausanne HC	BCF Arena, Fribourg	Recap
No scoring		First period	No scoring
No scoring		Second period	No scoring
No scoring		Third period	44:09 - Riat (Fuchs, Djoos) 54:24 - Rochette (Raffl) (SH1)
Reto Berra ( 14 saves / 16 shots )		Goalie stats	Connor Hughes ( 39 saves / 39 shots )

8 April	Lausanne HC	3-1	Fribourg-Gottéron	Vaudoise Aréna, Lausanne	Recap
No scoring		First period	No scoring
38:58 - Raffl (Bozon, Jäger)		Second period	No scoring
46:34 - Bozon (Jäger, Frick) 59:47 - Rochette (Holdener, Djoos)		Third period	DiDomenico (Bykov) - 42:10
Connor Hughes ( 33 saves / 34 shots )		Goalie stats	Reto Berra ( 27 saves / 29 shots )

10 April	Fribourg-Gottéron	2-4	Lausanne HC	BCF Arena, Fribourg	Recap
Mottet (Sprunger, Diaz) - 2:34		First period	No scoring
No scoring		Second period	21:34 - Pilut (Frick, Suomela) 30:13 - Riat (Fuchs, Sekáč)
Sörensen (Wallmark, Gunderson) (PP1) - 48:16		Third period	40:52 - Sekáč (Suomela, Djoos) (PP1) 58:49 - Sekáč (Bozon, Glauser) (EN)
Reto Berra ( 19 saves / 22 shots )		Goalie stats	Connor Hughes ( 27 saves / 29 shots )

Lausanne HC won the series 4–1

==== Finals ====
16 April	ZSC Lions	2-1	Lausanne HC	Swiss Life Arena, Zürich	Recap
No scoring		First period	14:40 - Riat (Fuchs, Hughes) (PP1)
No scoring		Second period	Weber (Lammikko) - 28:34; Grant (Marti) - 31:37
No scoring		Third period	No scoring
Šimon Hrubec ( 34 saves / 35 shots )		Goalie stats	Connor Hughes ( 26 saves / 28 shots )

18 April	Lausanne HC	4-2	ZSC Lions	Vaudoise Aréna, Lausanne	Recap
9:16 - Andrighetto (Malgin )		First period	Raffl (Jäger, Bozon) - 3:23
37:24 - Bozon (Ķēniņš, Almond)		Second period	No scoring
50:11 - Riat (Kovacs); 58:08 - Raffl (Pilut, Fuchs) (PP1)		Third period	Andrighetto (Malgin, Kukan) (PP1) - 42:20
Connor Hughes ( 25 saves / 27 shots )		Goalie stats	Šimon Hrubec ( 17 saves / 21 shots )

20 April	ZSC Lions	4-2	Lausanne HC	Swiss Life Arena, Zürich	Recap
Lammikko (Frödén, Lehtonen) (PP1) - 2:08		First period	18:56 - Rochette (Glauser, Sekáč)
Weber (Schäppi, Sigrist) - 30:59; Malgin (Balcers, Weber) - 32:23		Second period	21:46 - Pilut (Ķēniņš, Djoos)
Sigrist		Third period	No scoring
Šimon Hrubec ( 26 saves / 28 shots )		Goalie stats	Connor Hughes ( 21 saves / 25 shots )

23 April	Lausanne HC	5-2	ZSC Lions	Vaudoise Aréna, Lausanne	Recap
13:28 - Glauser (Ķēniņš, Holdener)		First period	No scoring
24:58 - Kovacs (Fuchs, Frick); 33:21 - Bozon (Raffl, Pilut)		Second period	Balcers (Malgin, Andrighetto) - 31:13
50:35 - Sekáč (Jäger, Suomela) (PP1); 58:35 - Almond (EN)		Third period	Hollenstein (Bodenmann, Schäppi) - 57:54
Connor Hughes ( 23 saves / 25 shots )		Goalie stats	Šimon Hrubec ( 25 saves / 29 shots )

25 April	ZSC Lions	3-0	Lausanne HC	Swiss Life Arena, Zürich	Recap
No scoring		First period	No scoring
Lammikko (Frödén, Kukan) - 37:27; Rohrer (Grant, Riedi) - 38:18		Second period	No scoring
Sigrist (EN) - 59:01		Third period	No scoring
Šimon Hrubec ( 25 saves / 25 shots )		Goalie stats	Connor Hughes ( 34 saves / 36 shots )

27 April	Lausanne HC	5-3	ZSC Lions	Vaudoise Aréna, Lausanne	Recap
4:18 - Suomela (Sekáč) (PP1)		First period	No scoring
26:22 - Riat (Fuchs, Kovacs); 32:10 - Almond (Holdener, Ķēniņš); 34:03 - Fuchs (Kovacs, Riat); 38:59 - Riat (Kovacs, Pilut)		Second period	C. Baltisberger (Schäppi) - 39:38
No scoring		Third period	Kukan (Harrington, Malgin) - 42:59; Malgin (Grant, Kukan) (PP1) - 48:28
Connor Hughes ( 29 saves / 32 shots )		Goalie stats	Šimon Hrubec ( 19 saves / 23 shots ) Robin Zumbühl ( 8 saves / 9 shots )

30 April	ZSC Lions	2-0	Lausanne HC	Swiss Life Arena, Zürich	Recap
No scoring		First period	No scoring
Frödén (Lammikko, Harrington) - 39:16		Second period	No scoring
Lammikko (Sigrist, Rohrer) - 46:57		Third period	No scoring
Šimon Hrubec ( 26 saves / 26 shots )		Goalie stats	Connor Hughes ( 40 saves / 42 shots )

ZSC Lions won the series 4–3

=== Team of Swiss champions ===
Goalkeepers: Šimon Hrubec, Robin Zumbühl

Defense: Phil Baltisberger, Patrick Geering, Scott Harrington, Dean Kukan, Mikko Lehtonen, Christian Marti, Dario Trutmann, Yannick Weber

Offense: Sven Andrighetto, Rūdolfs Balcers, Chris Baltisberger, Simon Bodenmann, Jesper Frödén, Derek Grant, Denis Hollenstein, Juho Lammikko, Denis Malgin, Willy Riedi, Vinzenz Rohrer, Reto Schäppi, Justin Sigrist, Yannick Zehnder

Coaching: Marc Crawford, Rob Cookson, Fabio Schwarz
