= Santeri Alatalo =

Finnish ice hockey player (born 1990)

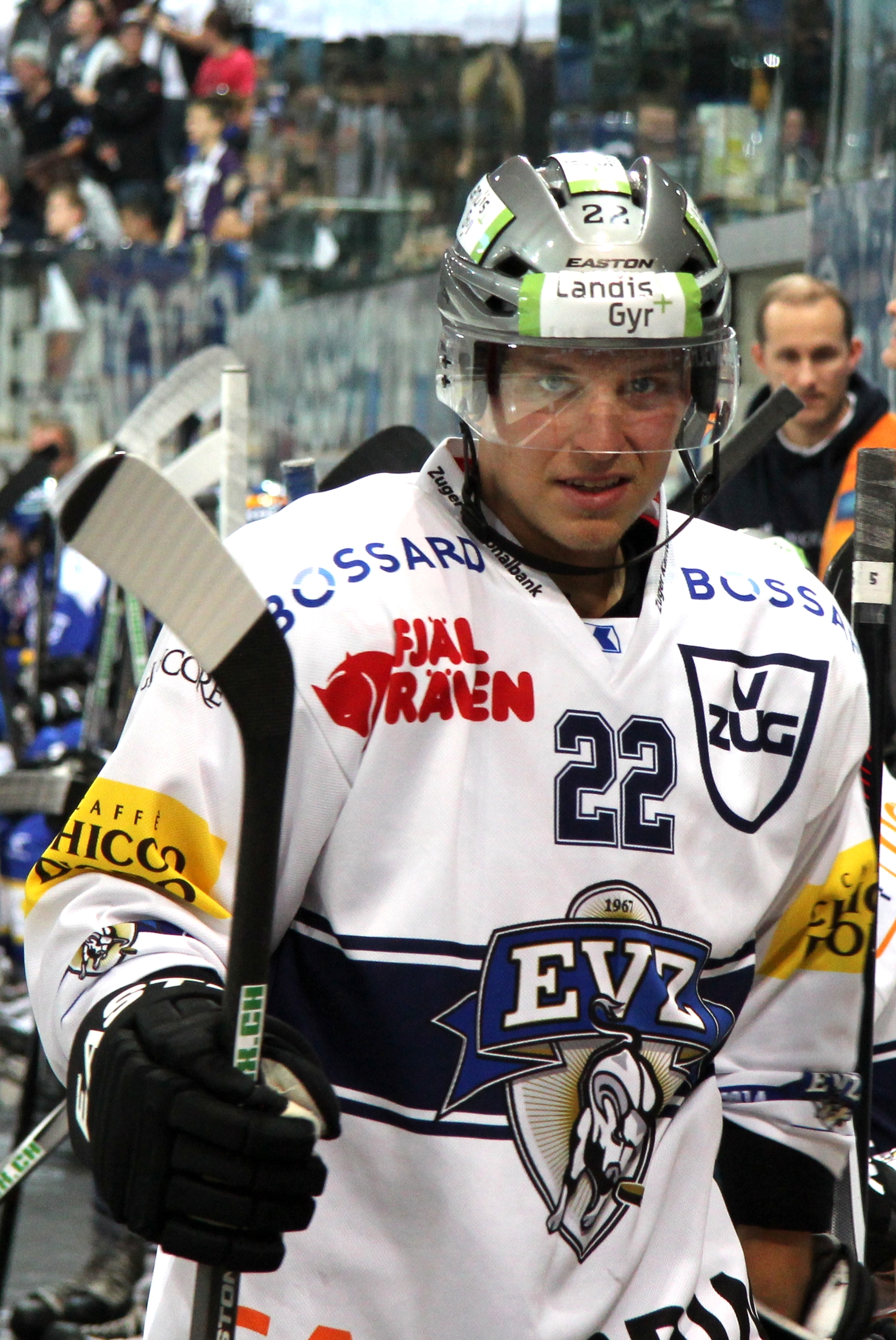
- Alatalo in 2014
- Born: May 9, 1990 (age 36) Tampere, Finland
- Height: 5 ft 10 in (178 cm)
- Weight: 183 lb (83 kg; 13 st 1 lb)
- Position: Defence
- Shoots: Left
- NL team Former teams: HC Lugano; HPK; HC Davos; EV Zug
- National team: Switzerland
- Playing career: 2008–present

Santeri Alatalo (born May 9, 1990) is a Finnish-Swiss professional ice hockey defenceman who currently plays for HC Lugano of the National League (NL).

== Playing career ==
Alatalo came through the youth ranks of Finnish team JYP. He moved to HPK youth program in 2007 and made his debut in the country's top-tier SM-liiga during the 2008–09 season. He helped HPK to a trip to the finals in 2010, where they were defeated by HC TPS.

Aatalo made his debut in the Swiss National League A (NLA) in the 2012–13 season with HC Davos after a mid-season transfer from HPK. On December 20, 2012, it was announced that Alatalo signed a two-year contract with NLA rivals EV Zug to begin the following season. In October 2014, he was handed a contract extension through 2017.

In 2020 Alatalo received a Swiss passport, and with it, he has the opportunity to represent the Swiss national team.

Alatalo won his first NL championship with EV Zug in May 2021.

On May 10, 2021, Alatalo agreed to a four-year deal with HC Lugano through the 2024–25 season.

== Personal life ==
Alatalo's father Matti Alatalo is an ice hockey coach.

In 2020, Alatalo received Swiss citizenship.

== Career statistics ==
=== Regular season and playoffs ===
			Regular season					Playoffs
Season	Team	League	GP	G	A	Pts	PIM	GP	G	A	Pts	PIM
2006–07	JYP	FIN U18	15	2	4	6	53	8	0	0	0	8
2006–07	JYP	FIN U20	3	0	0	0	2	—	—	—	—	—
2007–08	HPK	FIN U18	21	6	7	13	36	—	—	—	—	—
2007–08	HPK	FIN U20	21	0	1	1	6	—	—	—	—	—
2008–09	HPK	FIN U20	41	5	10	15	80	4	1	0	1	18
2008–09	HPK	SM-l	4	0	0	0	0	—	—	—	—	—
2008–09	Suomi U20	Mestis	2	0	0	0	0	—	—	—	—	—
2009–10	HPK	FIN U20	28	1	11	12	24	4	1	4	5	22
2009–10	HPK	SM-l	3	1	0	1	2	1	0	0	0	2
2009–10	Suomi U20	Mestis	1	0	0	0	0	—	—	—	—	—
2009–10	SaPKo	Mestis	9	0	1	1	4	—	—	—	—	—
2010–11	HPK	SM-l	59	3	7	10	48	2	0	0	0	0
2011–12	HPK	SM-l	40	1	5	6	30	—	—	—	—	—
2012–13	HPK	SM-l	4	0	2	2	0	—	—	—	—	—
2012–13	HC Davos	NLA	36	0	7	7	16	3	0	0	0	2
2013–14	EV Zug	NLA	49	3	12	15	40	—	—	—	—	—
2014–15	EV Zug	NLA	47	3	6	9	69	6	0	1	1	6
2015–16	EV Zug	NLA	50	1	9	10	18	4	0	0	0	6
2016–17	EV Zug	NLA	38	7	8	15	50	16	1	5	6	6
2017–18	EV Zug	NL	31	0	8	8	22	5	0	1	1	6
2018–19	EV Zug	NL	50	9	14	23	90	14	0	11	11	18
2019–20	EV Zug	NL	50	4	23	27	32	—	—	—	—	—
2020–21	EV Zug	NL	44	7	25	32	30	12	0	8	8	8
2021–22	HC Lugano	NL	50	5	33	38	30	6	2	4	6	6
2022–23	HC Lugano	NL	52	6	20	26	42	8	0	0	0	6
2023–24	HC Lugano	NL	47	4	12	16	18	9	3	5	8	8
2024–25	HC Lugano	NL	49	4	17	21	39	—	—	—	—	—
2025–26	HC Lugano	NL	50	5	17	22	26	4	0	0	0	0
SM-l totals			110	5	14	19	80	3	0	0	0	2
NL totals			643	58	211	269	532	87	6	35	41	72

=== International ===
Year	Team	Event	Result	GP	G	A	Pts	PIM
2021	Switzerland	WC	6th	8	1	2	3	4
2022	Switzerland	OG	8th	5	0	1	1	4
Senior totals				13	1	3	4	8
