= Lukas Bengtsson =

Swedish ice hockey player (born 1994)

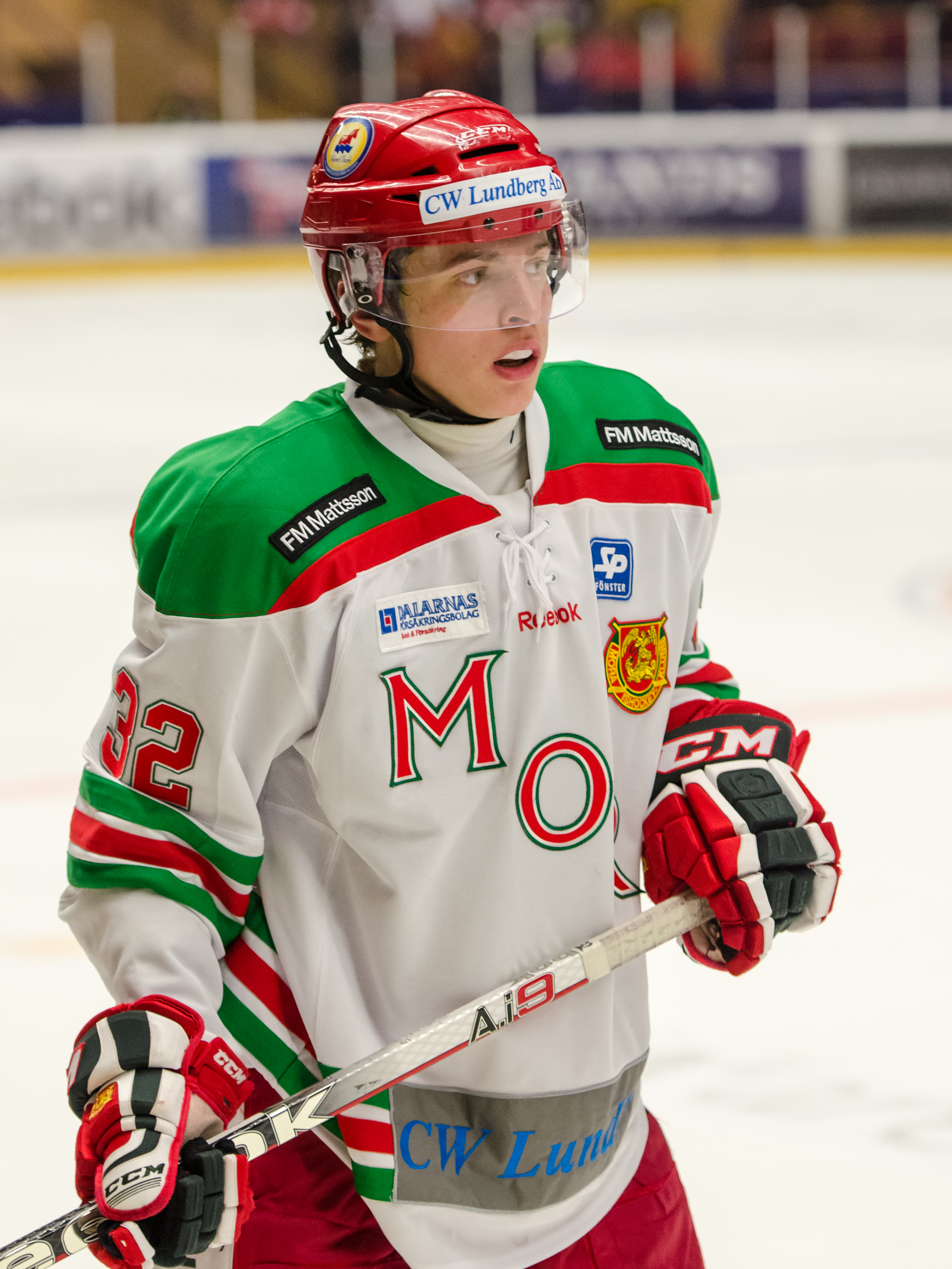
- Bengtsson playing for Mora IK in 2012
- Born: 14 April 1994 (age 32) Stockholm, Sweden
- Height: 180 cm (5 ft 11 in)
- Weight: 78 kg (172 lb; 12 st 4 lb)
- Position: Defense
- Shoots: Right
- NL team Former teams: EV Zug; Frölunda HC; WBS Penguins; Linköping HC; SKA Saint Petersburg; Dinamo Minsk; Växjö Lakers
- National team: Sweden
- NHL draft: Undrafted
- Playing career: 2012–present

Lukas Bengtsson (born 14 April 1994) is a Swedish professional ice hockey defenseman. He is currently playing with EV Zug in the National League (NL).

== Playing career ==
At the youth level, Bengtsson played for Huddinge IK, Djurgårdens IF, and Mora IK. He logged his first minutes in Sweden’s second-tier league HockeyAllsvenskan with Mora’s men’s team during the 2011–12 season.

In February 2015, he signed with Frölunda HC of Sweden’s top-flight SHL. He made 42 appearances, recording nine goals as well as 12 assists, as Frölunda won the 2016 SHL title. Bengtsson was also influential in the team's success in the Champions Hockey League: He saw the ice in ten contests, scoring two goals and assisting on five more, helping Frölunda capture the CHL title.

On 27 April 2016, he penned a two-year, entry-level contract with the Pittsburgh Penguins of the National Hockey League (NHL).

During the 2016 offseason, Bengtsson was diagnosed with Lyme disease and underwent antibiotic treatment. He began training camp with the Penguins, but soon the disease returned, and he was placed on injured reserve. He underwent another antibiotic treatment and played his first AHL game for the Wilkes-Barre/Scranton Penguins on 13 November 2016. After a 6 January 2017 game during which Bengtsson felt exhaustion and intense pain, he was shut down for the season. Further tests revealed he probably never had Lyme disease; instead, in March 2017, Bengtsson was diagnosed with Postural orthostatic tachycardia syndrome. Bengtsson was able to return to play for Wilkes-Barre/Scranton before the 2017–18 season.

At the conclusion of his entry-level contract with the Penguins, Bengtsson, an impending restricted free agent, opted to return to Sweden, signing a three-year contract with Linköpings HC of the SHL on 18 May 2018. In the 2018–19 season, Bengtsson led the defense of Linköpings in scoring with seven goals and 24 points in 42 games.

Opting for a release from his only season with Linköping HC, Bengtsson was signed to a lucrative two-year contract with Russian club SKA Saint Petersburg of the KHL on 21 May 2019.

Following two seasons with SKA, Bengtsson was traded in the off-season to HC Dinamo Minsk in exchange for Stepan Falkovsky on 16 June 2021. At the end of the season, March 11 left the team.

In May 2022, he signed a three-year contract with the Växjö Lakers of the SHL. In his lone season with the Lakers in 2022–23, Bengstsson was a fixture on the blueline and helped the club claim SHL championship.

== International play ==
Medal record

Representing Sweden

Ice hockey

World Championships
Bronze medal – third place	2024 Czech Republic	

Bengtsson represented Sweden at the 2024 IIHF World Championship and won a bronze medal.

== Career statistics ==
=== Regular season and playoffs ===
			Regular season					Playoffs
Season	Team	League	GP	G	A	Pts	PIM	GP	G	A	Pts	PIM
2010–11	Mora IK	J18	33	3	12	15	4	3	0	0	0	0
2010–11	Mora IK II	SWE.2 U20	2	2	0	2	2	—	—	—	—	—
2011–12	Mora IK	J18	9	1	2	3	0	—	—	—	—	—
2011–12	Mora IK	J20	25	3	5	8	37	—	—	—	—	—
2011–12	Mora IK	Allsv	3	0	0	0	0	—	—	—	—	—
2012–13	Mora IK	J20	32	4	14	18	18	—	—	—	—	—
2012–13	Mora IK	Allsv	22	1	3	4	2	—	—	—	—	—
2013–14	Mora IK	J20	2	2	2	4	0	—	—	—	—	—
2013–14	Mora IK	Allsv	45	13	20	33	10	5	2	3	5	0
2014–15	Mora IK	Allsv	43	8	23	31	10	5	0	2	2	2
2014–15	Frölunda HC	SHL	—	—	—	—	—	9	1	3	4	2
2015–16	Frölunda HC	SHL	30	7	7	14	12	12	2	5	7	0
2016–17	Wilkes-Barre/Scranton Penguins	AHL	16	1	5	6	6	—	—	—	—	—
2017–18	Wilkes-Barre/Scranton Penguins	AHL	37	0	15	15	8	3	0	1	1	0
2018–19	Linköping HC	SHL	42	7	17	24	12	—	—	—	—	—
2019–20	SKA Saint Petersburg	KHL	26	2	11	13	8	4	1	2	3	4
2020–21	SKA Saint Petersburg	KHL	39	4	16	20	10	12	1	2	3	8
2021–22	Dinamo Minsk	KHL	42	4	15	19	14	—	—	—	—	—
2022–23	Växjö Lakers	SHL	48	12	18	30	10	18	1	8	9	2
2023–24	EV Zug	NL	48	5	24	29	10	11	2	5	7	6
SHL totals			120	26	42	68	34	39	4	16	20	4
KHL totals			107	10	42	52	32	16	2	4	6	12

=== International ===
Year	Team	Event	Result	GP	G	A	Pts	PIM
2014	Sweden	WJC	2nd place, silver medalist(s)	7	1	2	3	0
2022	Sweden	OG	4th	6	1	1	2	0
2023	Sweden	WC	6th	8	0	1	1	2
2024	Sweden	WC	3rd place, bronze medalist(s)	10	0	2	2	0
Junior totals				7	1	2	3	0
Senior totals				24	1	4	5	2

== Awards and honors ==
Awards	Year
SHL
Le Mat Trophy	2023
