= Lawrence Pilut =

Swedish ice hockey player

- Born: 30 December 1995 (age 30) Tingsryd, Sweden
- Height: 5 ft 11 in (180 cm)
- Weight: 194 lb (88 kg; 13 st 12 lb)
- Position: Defence
- Shoots: Left
- NL team Former teams: SC Rapperswil-Jona Lakers; HV71; Buffalo Sabres; Traktor Chelyabinsk; Lausanne HC
- National team: Sweden
- NHL draft: Undrafted
- Playing career: 2013–present

Lawrence Pilut (born 30 December 1995) is a Swedish professional ice hockey defenceman for Rapperswil-Jona Lakers of the National League (NL). An undrafted player, Pilut played in Sweden with HV71, with who he won the SHL championship in 2017. The following season Pilut won the SHL Defenseman of the year and the Swedish Defenseman of the Year (Salming Trophy), which earned a move to North America where he played briefly in the NHL with the Buffalo Sabres. He has also played with Traktor Chelyabinsk of the KHL, and Lausanne HC of the National League (NL).

== Playing career ==
Pilut began playing hockey as a youth in his hometown of Tingsryd and played at the under-18 level with Tingsryds AIF before transferring to HV71. Pilut made his Swedish Hockey League (SHL) debut playing with HV71 during the 2013–14 season.

Pilut continued in the SHL with HV71 and in the 2017–18 season, he elevated his development to have a dominant season in contributing with eight goals and 38 points in 52 games to be selected as the league's Defenceman of the Year.

In gaining NHL interest from his breakout season, Pilut left the SHL and signed as an undrafted free agent to a two-year, entry-level contract with the Buffalo Sabres on 15 May 2018. Pilut made his NHL debut on 30 November 2018, in a game against the Florida Panthers. On 8 January 2019, Pilut scored his first career NHL goal in a 5–1 win over the New Jersey Devils.

Pilut became a restricted free agent following the 2019–20 season. On 9 June 2020, he signed a two-year contract with Traktor Chelyabinsk of the Kontinental Hockey League (KHL).

After two successful seasons in the KHL with Chelyabinsk, Pilut returned to North America and the Sabres organization in agreeing to a one-year, two-way contract on 15 July 2022. On 6 June 2023, he signed a two-year contract with Lausanne HC of the National League (NL).

== Personal life ==
Pilut's father, Larry Pilut, was also a professional hockey player. Larry is from the United States, but spent most of his playing career in Sweden, including 14 seasons with Tingsryds AIF.

== Career statistics ==
=== Regular season and playoffs ===
			Regular season					Playoffs
Season	Team	League	GP	G	A	Pts	PIM	GP	G	A	Pts	PIM
2010–11	Tingsryds AIF	J18	28	1	6	7	4	3	0	1	1	0
2011–12	HV71	J18	22	3	5	8	8	—	—	—	—	—
2011–12	HV71	J18 Allsv	12	3	4	7	14	3	0	1	1	0
2011–12	HV71	J20	3	0	1	1	0	—	—	—	—	—
2012–13	HV71	J18	8	1	4	5	2	—	—	—	—	—
2012–13	HV71	J18 Allsv	1	0	2	2	0	—	—	—	—	—
2012–13	HV71	J20	42	3	18	21	28	7	1	3	4	4
2013–14	HV71	J20	30	3	15	18	26	4	1	1	2	6
2013–14	HV71	SHL	22	0	4	4	18	6	0	0	0	0
2014–15	HV71	J20	2	0	0	0	0	—	—	—	—	—
2014–15	HV71	SHL	48	3	8	11	10	4	0	0	0	0
2014–15	Timrå IK	Allsv	4	0	2	2	0	—	—	—	—	—
2015–16	HV71	SHL	21	1	5	6	4	6	1	1	2	0
2016–17	HV71	SHL	48	3	9	12	20	16	2	3	5	8
2017–18	HV71	SHL	52	8	30	38	22	2	0	0	0	0
2018–19	Rochester Americans	AHL	30	4	22	26	14	3	0	0	0	0
2018–19	Buffalo Sabres	NHL	33	1	5	6	20	—	—	—	—	—
2019–20	Rochester Americans	AHL	37	6	17	23	20	—	—	—	—	—
2019–20	Buffalo Sabres	NHL	13	0	0	0	4	—	—	—	—	—
2020–21	Traktor Chelyabinsk	KHL	57	7	21	28	34	5	0	2	2	4
2021–22	Traktor Chelyabinsk	KHL	40	0	11	11	28	15	1	7	8	8
2022–23	Buffalo Sabres	NHL	17	1	2	3	0	—	—	—	—	—
2022–23	Rochester Americans	AHL	47	3	25	28	35	14	3	8	11	14
2023–24	Lausanne HC	NL	52	5	16	21	26	19	4	8	12	14
2024–25	Lausanne HC	NL	0	0	0	0	0	—	—	—	—	—
2025–26	SC Rapperswil-Jona Lakers	NL	11	1	6	7	0	9	1	3	4	6
SHL totals			191	15	56	71	74	34	3	4	7	8
NHL totals			63	2	7	9	24	—	—	—	—	—
KHL totals			97	7	32	39	62	20	1	9	10	12

=== International ===
Year	Team	Event	Result	GP	G	A	Pts	PIM
2012	Sweden	U17	4th	6	0	1	1	0
2021	Sweden	WC	9th	7	0	2	2	4
Junior totals				6	0	1	1	0
Senior totals				7	0	2	2	4

== Awards and honors ==
Award	Year
SHL
Le Mat Trophy champion	2017
Salming Trophy (best Swedish defenceman)	2018
