= Andreas Wingerli =

Swedish ice hockey player

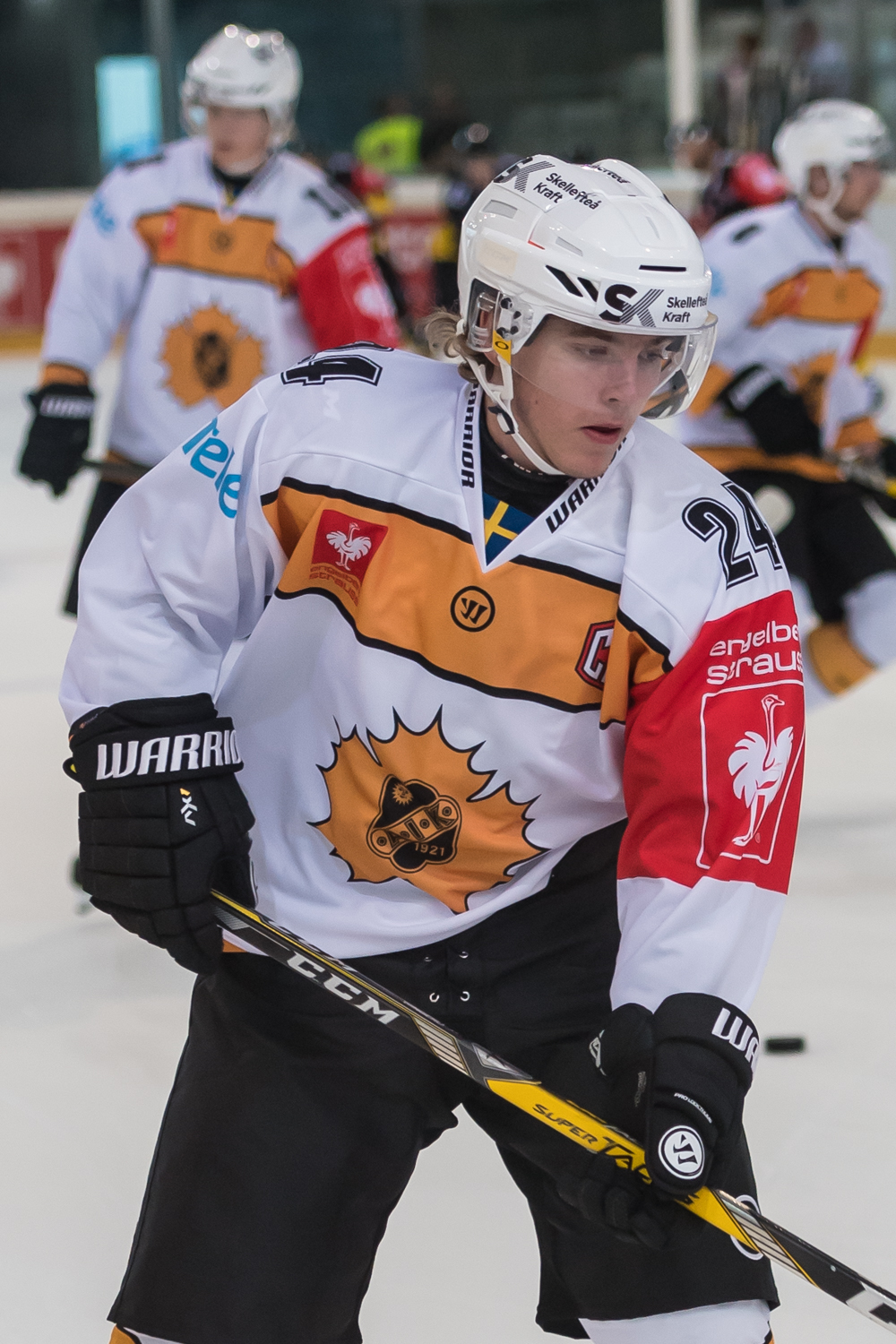
- Wingerli with Skellefteå AIK in 2016
- Born: September 11, 1997 (age 28) Lycksele, Sweden
- Height: 5 ft 8 in (173 cm)
- Weight: 170 lb (77 kg; 12 st 2 lb)
- Position: Left wing
- Shoots: Left
- NL team Former teams: EV Zug; Skellefteå AIK
- National team: Sweden
- NHL draft: Undrafted
- Playing career: 2015–present

Andreas Wingerli (born September 11, 1997) is a Swedish professional ice hockey forward. He is currently playing with EV Zug of the National League (NL).

== Playing career ==
Wingerli as a youth played with hometown club, Lycksele SK, at the under-18 and fourth tier Division.2 level. Wingerli joined the Skellefteå AIK program as a 15-year old, making his professional senior debut in the Swedish Hockey League during the 2014–15 SHL season on 8 January 2015.

In the 2015–16 season, Wingerli broke out offensively with Skellefteå AIK in the J20 SuperElit, leading the team in points-per-game, while splitting the season between junior and professional. Having secured a two-year senior contract extension with Skellefteå, Wingerli finished the regular season with 2 goals and 3 points in 38 appearances. He featured in 10 post-season games, helping Skellefteå AIK reach the Championship finals against Frölunda HC.

In his fourth season with Skellefteå, Wingerli played his first full season in the SHL in 2017–18, recording 3 goals and 13 points in 52 regular season contests, playing alongside line-mates, Sebastian Ohlsson and Tim Söderlund. Despite his diminutive frame, Wingerli was inserted to use his speed and smarts in the post-season, recording 3 assists in 16 playoff games. Having secured a one-year extension with Skellefteå, in the following 2018–19 season, Wingerli saw increased ice-time and recorded a best of 14 goals and 24 points in 52 regular season games.

After securing an improved two-year contract, Wingerli was named as an alternate captain for Skellefteå entering the 2019–20 season. In 51 appearances, Wingerli finished fourth in team scoring, establishing career marks of 16 goals and 32 points, before the post-season was cancelled due to the COVID-19 pandemic.

In his second season within the leadership group, his seventh with Skellefteå in 2020–21, Wingerli featured in a top six scoring role notching 12 goals and 28 points in 50 regular season games. He collected 2 goals in 12 playoff appearances before suffering a semi-final elimination against Rögle BK.

Having made 288 SHL appearances, recording 104 career points, on 4 June 2021, Wingerli exercised an NHL-out clause in his contract with Skellefteå AIK by agreeing to a one-year, two-way contract with the Colorado Avalanche.

After attending the 2021 Colorado Avalanche training camp, Wingerli was re-assigned and played the entirety of the 2021–22 season in the American Hockey League with affiliate, the Colorado Eagles. Used in a top-nine role, Wingerli missed just 4 regular season games and contributed with 10 goals and 22 points through 64 games.

Following a playoff run with the Eagles, while having been unable to earn a recall to the Avalanche, Wingerli as a pending restricted free agent opted to return to Sweden and resume the final year of his contract with Skellefteå AIK for the 2022–23 season on 15 June 2022.

Having concluded his contract with Skellefteå AIK, Wingerli left the SHL to sign a two-year contract with Swiss club, EV Zug of the NL, on 28 April 2023.

== International play ==
Wingerli first represented Sweden as a junior at the 2017 World Junior Championships in Montreal/Toronto, Canada. He collected an assist in 7 games helping Sweden to a fourth place finish.

Wingerli was selected to his first senior team, when he was among the Swedish team announced to compete at the 2021 IIHF World Championship in Riga, Latvia. He made his full international debut for Sweden in the Tournament opening game against Denmark in a 4–3 defeat on 22 May 2021. He scored his first international goal, marking the opening goal in a 4–2 defeat to the Czech Republic on 27 May 2021. He finished the tournament with 3 points through 7 round-robin games, as Sweden failed to progress past the group stage with a 9th place finish.

== Career statistics ==
=== Regular season and playoffs ===
			Regular season					Playoffs
Season	Team	League	GP	G	A	Pts	PIM	GP	G	A	Pts	PIM
2011–12	Lycksele	Div.2	1	0	0	0	0	—	—	—	—	—
2012–13	Lycksele	Div.2	9	5	0	5	4	—	—	—	—	—
2013–14	Skellefteå AIK	J20	5	0	0	0	0	—	—	—	—	—
2014–15	Skellefteå AIK	J20	38	4	10	14	18	5	1	0	1	2
2014–15	Skellefteå AIK	SHL	1	0	0	0	0	—	—	—	—	—
2015–16	Skellefteå AIK	J20	23	7	24	31	12	3	2	3	5	2
2015–16	Skellefteå AIK	SHL	38	2	1	3	4	10	0	0	0	0
2016–17	Skellefteå AIK	SHL	44	1	3	4	16	7	2	1	3	4
2016–17	Skellefteå AIK	J20	3	2	2	4	0	—	—	—	—	—
2017–18	Skellefteå AIK	SHL	52	3	10	13	18	16	0	3	3	10
2018–19	Skellefteå AIK	SHL	52	14	10	24	55	6	1	0	1	2
2019–20	Skellefteå AIK	SHL	51	16	16	32	41	—	—	—	—	—
2020–21	Skellefteå AIK	SHL	50	12	16	28	66	12	2	0	2	4
2021–22	Colorado Eagles	AHL	64	10	12	22	28	9	0	2	2	2
2022–23	Skellefteå AIK	SHL	52	14	18	32	24	17	1	2	3	4
2023–24	EV Zug	NL	49	11	9	20	16	11	3	5	8	8
SHL totals			340	62	74	136	224	68	6	6	12	24

=== International ===
Year	Team	Event	Result	GP	G	A	Pts	PIM
2017	Sweden	WJC	4th	7	0	1	1	0
2021	Sweden	WC	9th	7	1	2	3	0
Junior totals				7	0	1	1	0
Senior totals				7	1	2	3	0
