= Joël Genazzi =

Swiss ice hockey player

Joel Genazzi
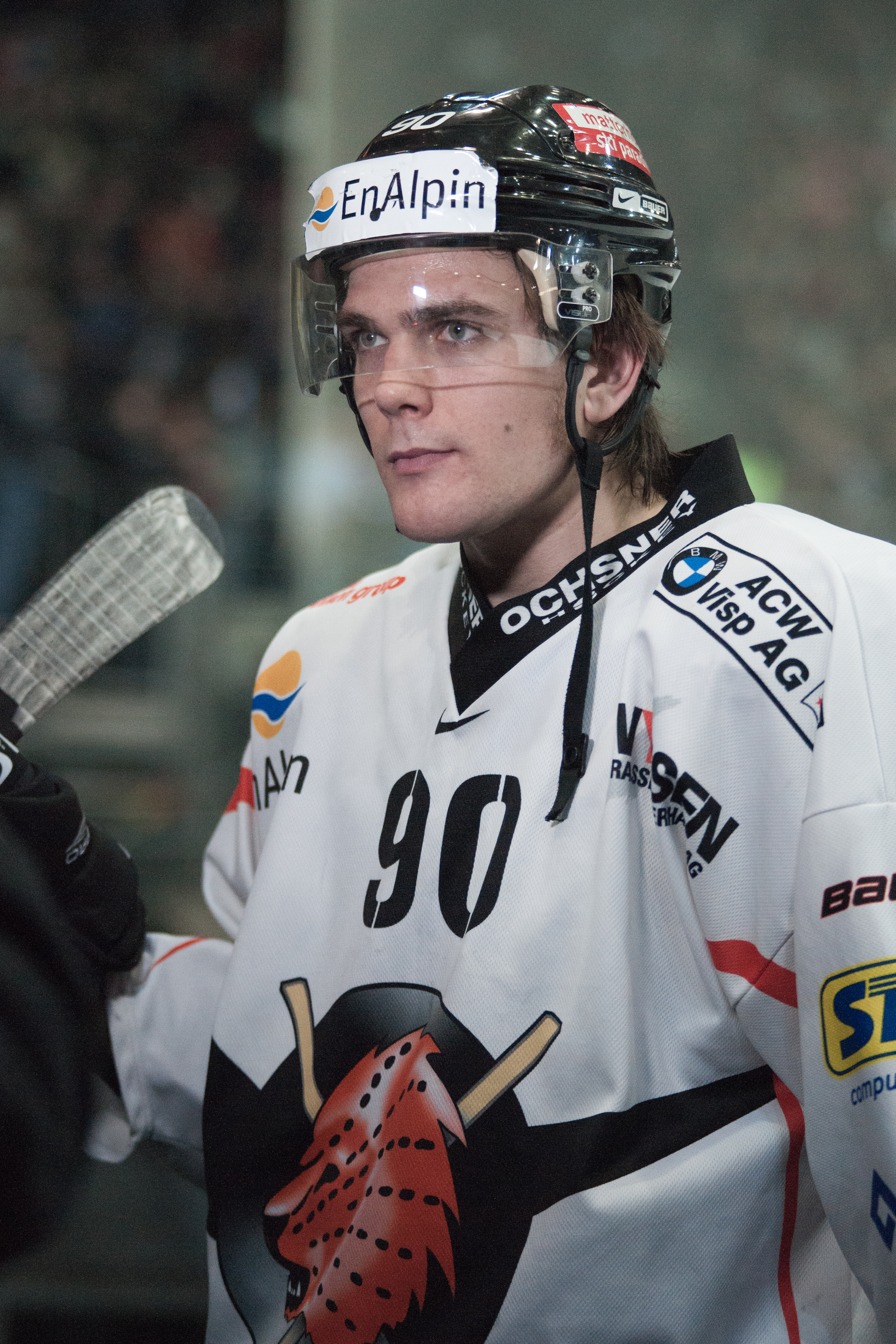
- Genazzi with EHC Visp in 2010
- Born: February 10, 1988 (age 38) London, England
- Height: 6 ft 1 in (185 cm)
- Weight: 198 lb (90 kg; 14 st 2 lb)
- Position: Defence
- Shot: Left
- Played for: HC Fribourg-Gottéron; SCL Tigers; Lausanne HC
- National team: Switzerland
- Playing career: 2007–2025

Joel Genazzi (born February 10, 1988) is a Swiss former professional ice hockey defenceman. He primarily played in the Swiss National League (NL), where he spent 18 seasons with HC Fribourg-Gottéron, the SCL Tigers, and Lausanne HC.

== Playing career ==
Genazzi made his National League (NL) debut playing with HC Fribourg-Gottéron during the 2006–07 season.

Genazzi failed to establish himself in the National League over 3 seasons with Fribourg and was loaned multiple times to various Swiss League (SL) teams. He had a breakout season in 2008–09 with Young-Sprinters HC, putting up 42 points (15 goals) in 42 games in the SL. Genazzi went on to play one more year in the SL with EHC Visp in 2009–10, racking up an impressive 51 points over 46 games. His stellar season allowed him to sign with the SCL Tigers of the National League for the next year.

Genazzi played 3 seasons with the Tigers before joining Lausanne HC for the 2013–14 season. At the conclusion of the season, Genazzi agreed to a two-year contract extension with Lausanne. On October 24, 2016, Genazzi was signed to a five-year contract extension worth CHF 3 million by Lausanne.

Following the end of his twelfth season with Lausanne, including two as captain, Genazzi announced his retirement from hockey on 26 April 2025.

== International play ==
Genazzi was a member of Switzerland's silver medal team at the 2018 IIHF World Championship. He played 5 of the team's 10 games.

== Career statistics ==
=== Regular season and playoffs ===
			Regular season					Playoffs
Season	Team	League	GP	G	A	Pts	PIM	GP	G	A	Pts	PIM
2004–05	Kloten Flyers	Elite Jr. A	42	7	8	15	10	9	1	1	2	6
2005–06	HC Fribourg-Gottéron	Elite Jr. A	40	6	17	23	50	—	—	—	—	—
2005–06	HC Düdingen Bulls	Div.1	9	3	0	3	0	8	3	0	3	12
2006–07	HC Fribourg-Gottéron	Elite Jr. A	38	21	9	30	103	—	—	—	—	—
2006–07	HC Fribourg-Gottéron	NLA	4	0	0	0	0	—	—	—	—	—
2006–07	HC Düdingen Bulls	Div.1	12	3	2	5	4	6	0	4	4	8
2007–08	HC Fribourg-Gottéron	Elite Jr. A	8	4	9	13	6	—	—	—	—	—
2007–08	HC Fribourg-Gottéron	NLA	23	0	0	0	2	5	0	0	0	0
2007–08	Young-Sprinters HC	NLB	33	5	10	15	20	—	—	—	—	—
2008–09	HC Fribourg-Gottéron	NLA	9	0	0	0	0	1	0	0	0	0
2008–09	Young-Sprinters HC	NLB	42	15	27	42	16	—	—	—	—	—
2009–10	EHC Visp	NLB	46	20	31	51	20	15	4	11	15	8
2010–11	SCL Tigers	NLA	37	2	2	4	18	4	0	0	0	2
2011–12	SCL Tigers	NLA	50	3	8	11	12	—	—	—	—	—
2012–13	SCL Tigers	NLA	41	9	7	16	10	—	—	—	—	—
2013–14	Lausanne HC	NLA	50	4	8	12	6	6	0	0	0	8
2014–15	Lausanne HC	NLA	50	2	19	21	8	7	0	1	1	4
2015–16	Lausanne HC	NLA	49	11	14	25	14	—	—	—	—	—
2016–17	Lausanne HC	NLA	47	16	15	31	18	4	2	2	4	4
2017–18	Lausanne HC	NL	50	9	29	38	36	—	—	—	—	—
2018–19	Lausanne HC	NL	50	4	21	25	24	12	3	2	5	6
2019–20	Lausanne HC	NL	49	10	11	21	30	—	—	—	—	—
2020–21	Lausanne HC	NL	48	8	19	27	39	6	0	1	1	2
2021–22	Lausanne HC	NL	47	7	23	30	16	8	0	1	1	0
2022–23	Lausanne HC	NL	51	5	11	16	45	—	—	—	—	—
2023–24	Lausanne HC	NL	50	1	3	4	14	19	0	3	3	4
2024–25	Lausanne HC	NL	49	2	3	5	31	19	0	2	2	2
NL totals			754	93	193	286	323	91	5	12	17	32

Medal record

Representing Switzerland

Ice hockey

World Championships
Silver medal – second place	2018 Denmark	

=== International ===
Year	Team	Event	Result	GP	G	A	Pts	PIM
2006	Switzerland	U18-D1	11th	5	0	1	1	2
2017	Switzerland	WC	6th	8	1	2	3	2
2018	Switzerland	WC	2nd place, silver medalist(s)	5	0	0	0	0
2019	Switzerland	WC	8th	7	1	2	3	0
Junior totals				5	0	1	1	2
Senior totals				20	2	4	6	2
