= Lausanne HC =

- City: Lausanne, Switzerland
- League: National League
- Founded: 1922
- Home arena: Vaudoise Aréna
- Colors
- General manager: John Fust
- Head coach: Geoff Ward
- Captain: Lukas Frick
- Affiliates: HCV Martigny
- Website: www.lausannehc.ch

Lausanne Hockey Club is a professional ice hockey team based in Lausanne, Switzerland. The team competes in the National League (NL), the highest league in Switzerland. The team plays its home games in the 10,000-seat Vaudoise Aréna.

== History ==
Founded in 1922, the Lausanne Hockey Club is one of the oldest clubs in Switzerland. They played for sixteen years at Chalet-à-Gobet, in the city heights. In 1938, LHC moved their headquarters to Montchoisi where, in 1941, they merged with Star HC to become the Montchoisi Hockey Club. On November 6, 1949, the team of Lausanne chose their original name: Lausanne Hockey Club. It is with this name that they started off in the Swiss national league.

Relegated to Nationalliga B in 1954, they powered back to the Nationalliga A on March 2, 1957 and remained there until 1961. For the next seventeen years, LHC remained at the Nationalliga B level where they had occasional success. On February 18, 1978, in front of over 7,000 fans, Lausanne Hockey Club obtained promotion to Nationalliga A, defeating HC Davos 8 goals to 4. After three seasons spent in the highest league, LHC, following the loss of a player in a car accident, was relegated to NLB. They remained there from 1981 to 1984 before falling to the 1. Liga while also moving to the International Ice Center at Malley (CIGM) where they still play today. They then played one season in first League (84-85) and made a round trip to NLB (85-86), to be back in the first League. Three years later they reached the finals in 1989 and obtain their promotion to NLB.

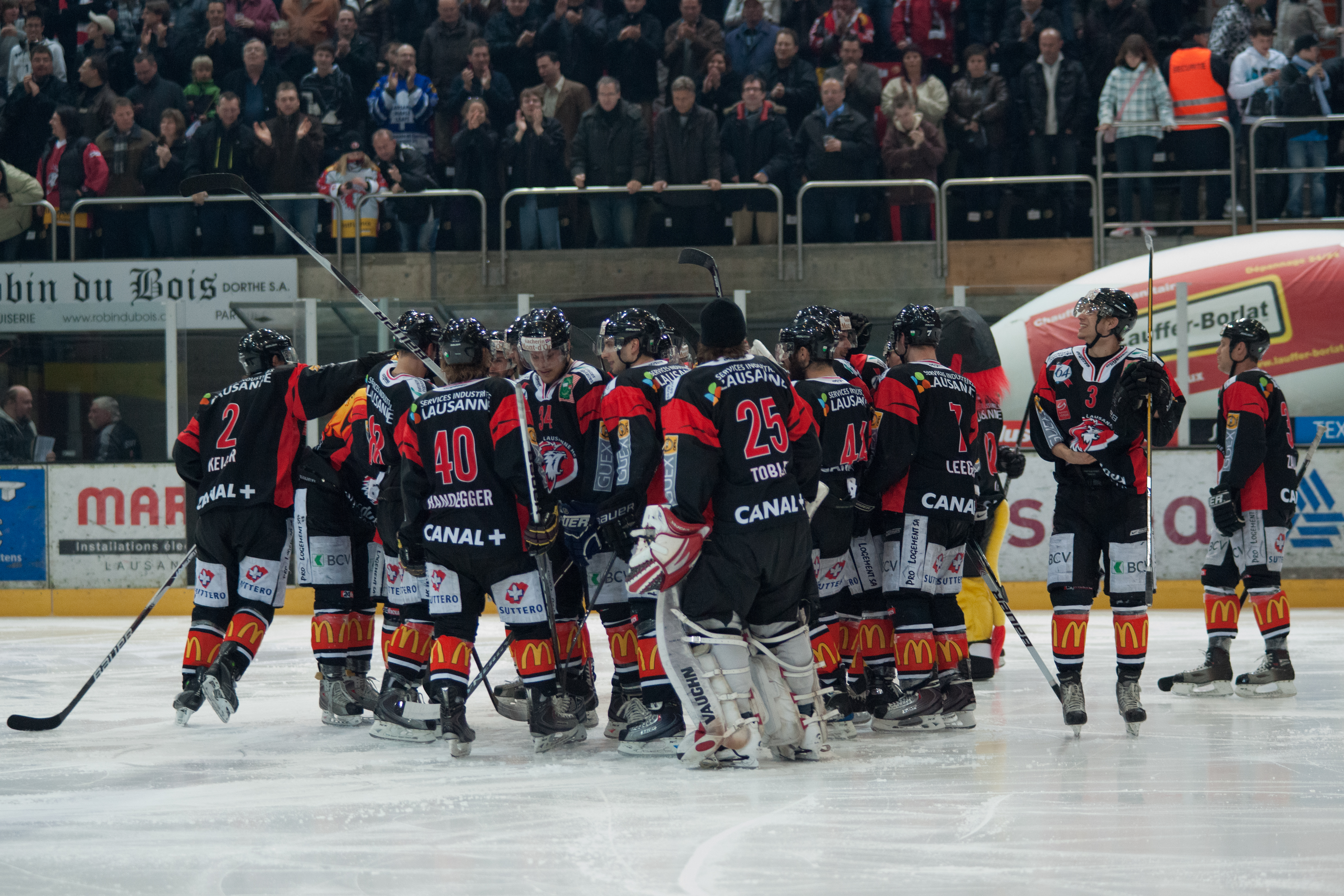
Lausanne HC's squad after a game on April 1, 2010

In 1992, the club's survival was threatened by a bankruptcy. The team saved itself from relegation to the 1. Liga (season 1992-1993). The season 1993-1994 saw participation in the finals to access the national League A, finals played in five games against Rapperswil, the latter winning it over. At the beginning of the 1994-1995 season, Lausanne Hockey Club was designated as the Nationalliga B favorite to access the NLA. Against GCK Lions during the finals and after five games, the decisive match was won by Lausanne 8 to 0. In the 1995-1996 season, after a series of losses the club decided to fire their head coach. The change didn't prevent Lausanne from being relegated to NLB at the end of the season. During the following four seasons, the LHC occupied the middle of the NLB ranking until 2000-2001 when they were at the head of the championship during almost the whole season. Lausanne won the title of champion of NLB and defeated HC La Chaux-de-Fonds for the promotion games. Winning against the HCC in six matches, LHC was back in NLA for the 2001-2002 season.

After a relegation in the 2004–05 season, Lausanne played the role of “favorite” for the other teams of the NLB. In April 2007, Canadians Barry Alter and Ken Lockett were introduced to the public as new majority owners of the club to help the club through financial difficulties. With the introduction of former coach Jim Koleff to the ownership group, later represented by his wife following his death, Lausanne was also backed by Hugh Quennec with interest already in fellow professional club, Genève-Servette HC.

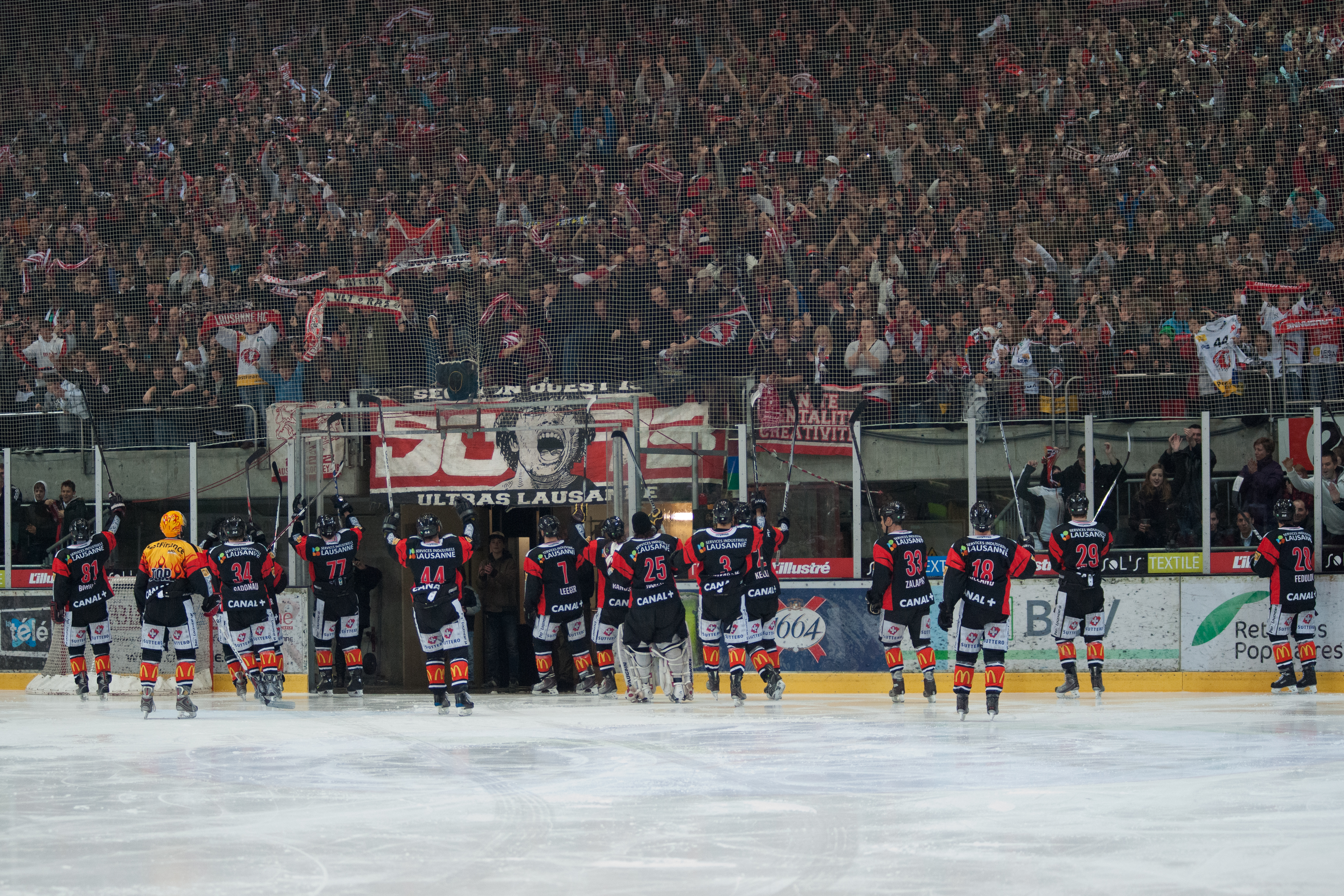
Lausanne HC after a match, 1 April 2010

The club tried to reach the NLA once again through promotion, but failed twice in the promotion games 2008–09 and the 2009–10 seasons, losing both times against EHC Biel in seven games. In the 2012–13 season, after a slow start into the regular season, Lausanne won the NLB championship for the 7th time, defeating EHC Olten in the play-off final. In the following promotion games, Lausanne defeated the SCL Tigers in six games to reach again the NLA for the 2013–14 season.

In 2013, following the series of promotion / relegation blocks against the SCL Tigers, the club moved up in the National League A with four wins and two defeats. During the 2014–15 season, their second in the NLA, the team averaged 6,711 spectators per game, ranking them third in the league in term of attendance.

In February 2016, American businessman Ken Stickney acquired the majority of shares of Lausanne from Quennec. Stickney was previously president of EHC Kloten and a member of Avenir Sport Entertainment LLC (ASE), the owner of the club.

In April 2016, the Lausanne released Danish head coach Heinz Ehlers after failing to make the playoffs for the 2015–16 season. Ehlers had achieved with the playoff appearances in 2014 and 2015, the largest club successes in the NLA until then. His was succeeded by Daniel Ratushny on April 26, 2016. Under Ratushny, the team used an overly defensive style capitalizing on opportunistic offense. Enjoying initial success they finished the 2016–17 regular season in fourth place. In the playoffs, however, LHC did not find victory in the quarter-final's against HC Davos, suffering a series sweep.

Following 12 points in their first 10 games in the 2017–18 season, Ratushny was let go of his coaching duties on 11 October 2017. He was replaced on an interim basis by former Lausanne youth coach and fellow Canadian, Yves Sarault, and later announced to remain for the remainder of the season. However, with the club still struggling into the new year placing third from the bottom of the league, a second coaching change was announced as Sarault was replaced by John Fust on 8 February 2018.

In the 2024–25 season, Lausanne HC finished first in the National League regular season standings for the first time in club history, marking a major milestone for the organization. The team delivered a consistent and dominant campaign, ending ahead of traditional powerhouses such as ZSC Lions and SC Bern. Despite their strong regular-season performance, Lausanne did not capture the league title, falling short in the playoffs.

== Venues ==
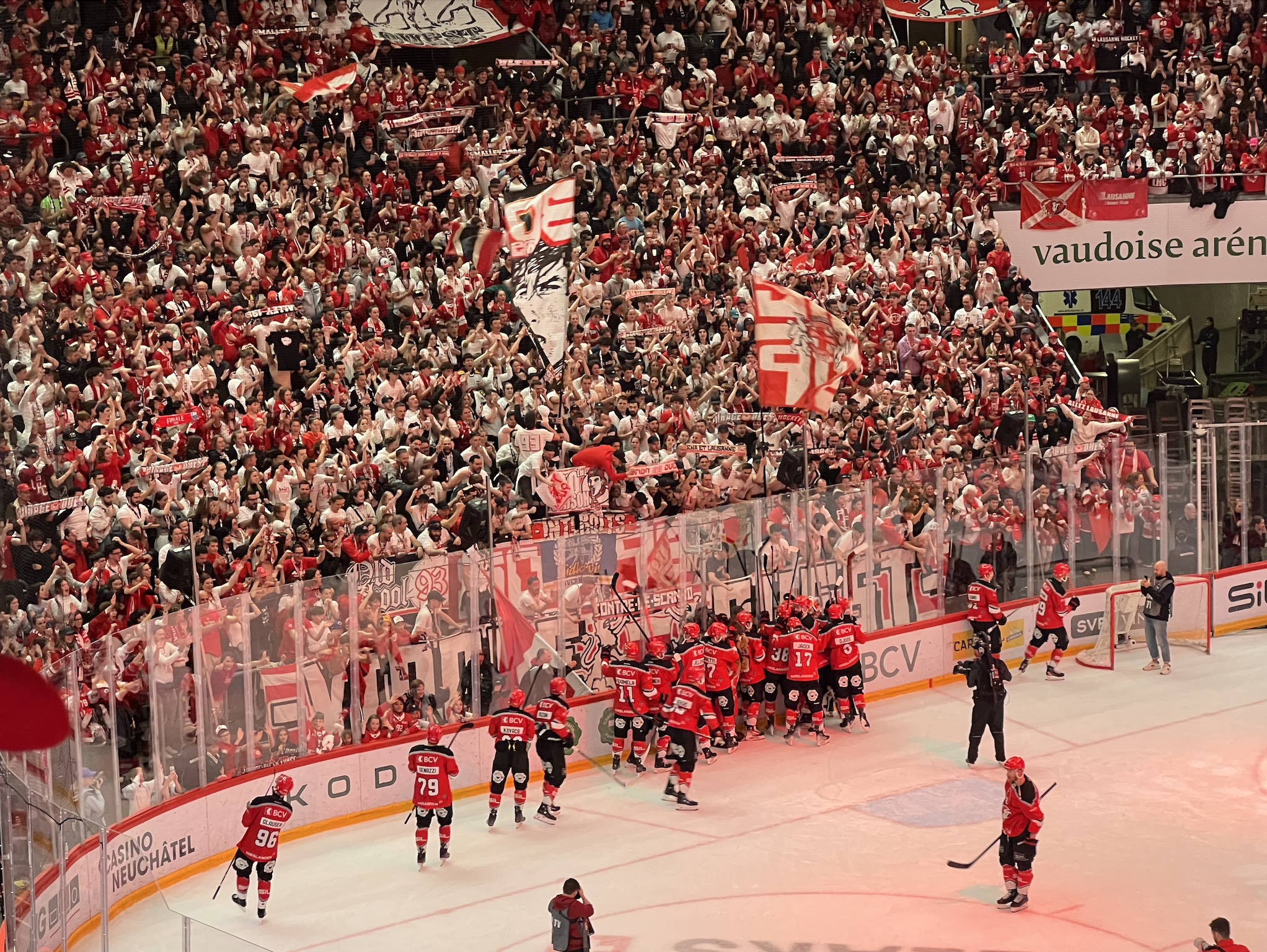
Lausanne's new arena in 2024.

The home games of the Lausanne HC were played in the CIG de Malley from 1984 to 2017 and had an official capacity of 8,000 spectators. While waiting for completion of a new arena in the 2017–18 season, Lausanne moved to a temporarily built ice hockey arena known as the 2.0 Malley, which sat 6,700 spectators. It was established as the largest temporary ice hockey arena in the world.

The new arena opened in September 2019. The new ice rink received the sponsorship name Vaudoise Aréna, after the insurance company Vaudoise.

== Players ==
=== Current roster ===
Updated 15 February 2025

No.	Nat	Player	Pos	S/G	Age	Acquired	Birthplace
5	(United States)	Gavin Bayreuther	D	L	32	2024	Concord, New Hampshire, United States
71	(Switzerland)	Benjamin Bougro	C	L	23	2021	Saint-Germain-en-Laye, France
94	(France)	Tim Bozon	LW	L	32	2020	St. Louis, Missouri, United States
81	(France)	Floran Douay	LW	L	31	2025	Sallanches, France
66	(Switzerland)	Cédric Fiedler	D	L	25	2024	Boca Raton, Florida, United States
38	(Switzerland)	Lukas Frick	D	L	32	2017	Zuzwil, Switzerland
14	(Switzerland)	Jason Fuchs	C	L	31	2021	Bern, Switzerland
79	(Switzerland)	Joël Genazzi	D	L	38	2013	Zürich, Switzerland
96	(Switzerland)	Andrea Glauser	D	R	30	2021	Zauggenried, Switzerland
91	(Switzerland)	Fabian Heldner	D	R	30	2019	Visp, Switzerland
4	(Switzerland)	Makai Holdener	W	R	29	2021	Genève, Switzerland
19	(Switzerland)	Michael Hügli	RW	R	30	2022	Seedorf, Switzerland
17	(Switzerland)	Ken Jäger (C)	C	R	28	2020	Davos, Switzerland
30	(Switzerland)	Antoine Keller	G	L	22	2024	Dijon, France
81	(Latvia)	Ronalds Ķēniņš	LW	L	35	2018	Riga, Latvia
23	(Sweden)	Robin Kovács	LW	L	29	2018	Stockholm, Sweden
7	(Switzerland)	Aurelien Marti	D	L	32	2020	Vevey, Switzerland
68	(Switzerland)	Matthias Mémeteau	C	R	26	2020	Martigny, Switzerland
29	(Finland)	Ahti Oksanen	C/LW	L	33	2024	Kirkkonummi, Finland
33	(Switzerland)	Kevin Pasche	G	R	23	2023	Lausanne, Switzerland
87	(Switzerland)	Marco Pedretti	RW	L	35	2022	Ajoie, Switzerland
20	(Sweden)	Lawrence Pilut	D	L	30	2023	Tingsryd, Sweden
18	(Switzerland)	Raphael Prassl	C	L	28	2024	Zürich, Switzerland
12	(Austria)	Michael Raffl (C)	LW	L	37	2022	Villach, Austria
9	(Switzerland)	Damien Riat	RW	R	29	2021	Genève, Switzerland
90	(Switzerland)	Théo Rochette	C	L	24	2023	Neuchâtel, Switzerland
77	(Czech Republic)	David Sklenička	D	L	30	2024	Rakovník, Czech Republic
11	(Finland)	Antti Suomela	C	L	32	2023	Espoo, Finland
67	(Switzerland)	Nathan Vouardoux	D	R	25	2024	Sierre, Switzerland
51	(Canada)	Ryan Spooner	C	L	34	2026	Ottawa, Canada

=== Honored members ===
Lausanne HC retired numbers
No.	Player	Position	Career	No. retirement
10	Gérard Dubi	F	1960–1981	–
16	Claude Friedrich	F	1970–1973, 1976–1983	–
21	Beat Kindler	G	1991–2003	–
39	Cristobal Huet	G	2012–2018	–
