= John Fust (ice hockey) =

Canadian ice hockey player (born 1972)

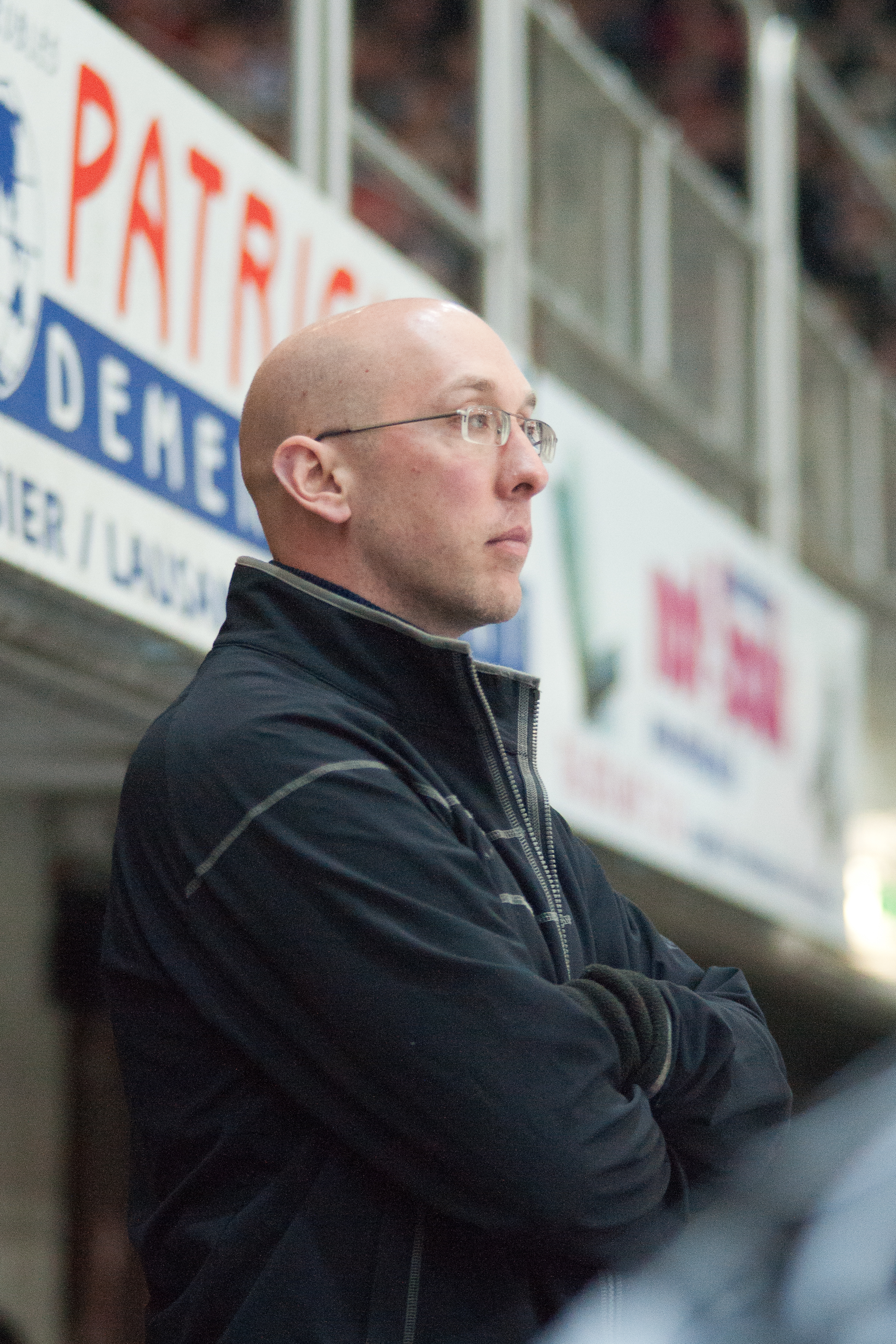
- John Fust in 2010
- Born: March 5, 1972 (age 54) Montreal, Quebec, Canada
- Height: 6 ft 0 in (183 cm)
- Weight: 180 lb (82 kg; 12 st 12 lb)
- Position: Forward
- Shot: Left
- Played for: SCL Tigers; HC Ambrì-Piotta
- NHL draft: Undrafted
- Playing career: 1994–2006

John Fust (born March 5, 1972) is a Canadian-Swiss professional ice hockey coach and a former professional ice hockey player.

== Playing career ==
Born in Montreal, Quebec, Fust played ice hockey at Princeton University. Following his graduation in 1994 he turned pro and spent the remainder of his career in Switzerland, playing in the country's first and second division. He won the championship in Switzerland's second-tier division National League B (NLB) with SC Herisau in 1997 and with SC Langnau one year later, helping both clubs to promotion to the top-flight National League A (NLA). Fust played in a total of 266 NLA contests for Langnau and HC Ambrì-Piotta, before spending the last two years of his playing career in the NLB, turning out for HC Forward Morges and HC Sierre.

== Coaching career ==
Following the end of his playing career, Fust started an education at the Canadian Security Intelligence Service, while working as a volunteer assistant coach of a college team.

Fust kicked off his head coaching career at Swiss NLB side EHC Visp in December 2007. He guided Visp to the NLB finals in 2010 and left the club at the end of the 2009-10 season to take charge of NLA team SCL Tigers, where he had spent five years as a player. Fust coached the Tigers to a sixth-place finish in the 2010-11 NLA regular season and their first ever trip to the NLA playoffs. He was relieved of his head coaching duties in December 2012 after a series of eight straight losses.

He was named assistant coach of NLA side Lausanne HC for the 2013-14 campaign and opted to leave the team after one year to work for the Swiss ice hockey federation: Fust served as assistant to head coach Glen Hanlon on the men's national team and took over the head coaching job at the Swiss U20 national team. After Hanlon stepped aside in October 2015, Fust served as interim head coach of the Swiss national team during the 2015 Deutschland-Cup and was then succeeded by Patrick Fischer. Fust remained in his position at the U20 national team until his contract with the Swiss ice hockey federation ended in 2016.

In April 2016, he signed a contract to return to EHC Visp. He took over the head coaching job at the club. In March 2017, he parted ways with the club after falling to HC La Chaux-de-Fonds in the NLB quarterfinals. Fust was named head coach of Swiss National League team Lausanne HC on February 8, 2018, replacing Yves Sarault. He stayed on the job until the end of the 2017-18 season and took over the job as head of the youth development at Lausanne in May 2018. Additionally, he was named an assistant coach for the Danish Men's National Team in April 2019.

== Career statistics ==
			Regular season					Playoffs
Season	Team	League	GP	G	A	Pts	PIM	GP	G	A	Pts	PIM
1988–89	Wexford Raiders	MetJBHL	2	2	0	2	0	—	—	—	—	—
1991–91	Princeton University	NCAA	7	0	0	0	0	—	—	—	—	—
1992–93	Princeton University	NCAA	21	3	4	7	14	—	—	—	—	—
1993–94	Princeton University	NCAA	15	5	5	10	10	—	—	—	—	—
1994–95	HC Martigny	NLB	10	0	1	1	8	—	—	—	—	—
1994–95	EHC Olten	NLB	24	8	5	13	28	3	4	0	4	6
1995–96	SC Herisau	NLB	24	9	9	18	14	5	3	2	5	6
1996–97	SC Herisau	NLB	33	12	11	23	52	11	7	6	13	12
1997–98	SC Langnau	NLB	10	3	3	6	8	16	3	7	10	16
1998–99	SC Langnau	NLA	45	12	7	19	69	—	—	—	—	—
1999–00	SC Langnau	NLA	45	12	12	24	59	—	—	—	—	—
2000–01	SC Langnau	NLA	44	10	24	34	26	—	—	—	—	—
2001–02	SC Langnau	NLA	43	11	14	25	41	—	—	—	—	—
2002–03	HC Ambrì-Piotta	NLA	44	10	9	19	10	4	1	1	2	0
2003–04	HC Ambrì-Piotta	NLA	45	3	7	10	12	7	0	0	0	4
2004–05	Forward-Morges HC	NLB	37	13	22	35	38	4	0	3	3	18
2005–06	Forward-Morges HC	NLB	21	8	6	14	12	—	—	—	—	—
2005–06	HC Sierre	NLB	16	6	7	13	16	13	2	2	4	4
NLA totals			266	58	73	131	217	11	1	1	2	4
NLB totals			175	59	64	123	176	52	19	20	39	62

== Personal ==
Fust's grandparents emigrated from St. Gallen, Switzerland to Canada in the 1920s. He obtained Swiss citizenship in 1984.
