= Lino Martschini =

Swiss ice hockey player

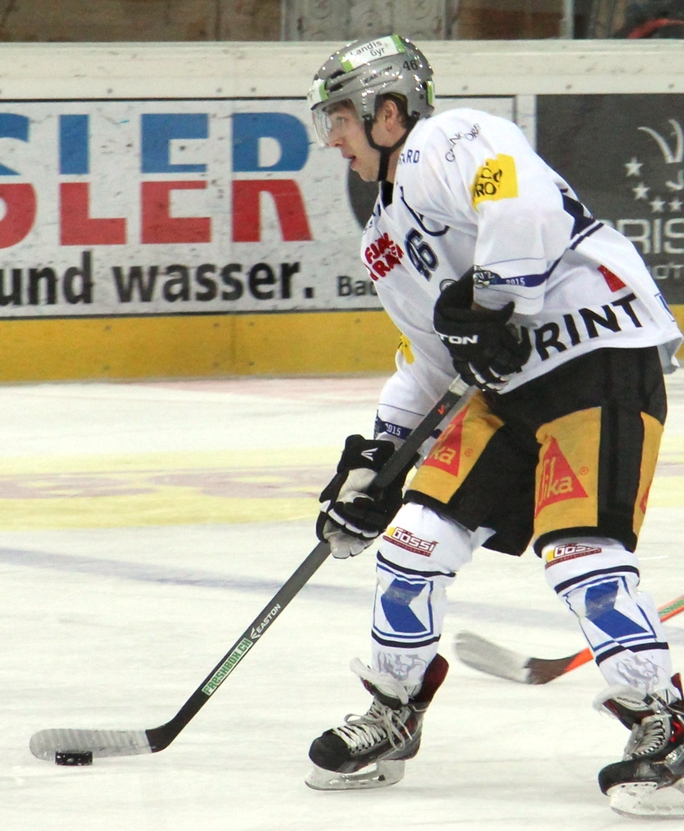
- Born: 21 January 1993 (age 33) Lucerne, Switzerland
- Height: 5 ft 6 in (168 cm)
- Weight: 143 lb (65 kg; 10 st 3 lb)
- Position: Right wing
- Shoots: Right
- NL team: EV Zug
- National team: Switzerland
- NHL draft: Undrafted
- Playing career: 2012–present

Lino Martschini (born 21 January 1993) is a Swiss professional ice hockey forward for EV Zug of the National League (NL) and the Swiss national team. He played his junior hockey for the Peterborough Petes of the Ontario Hockey League (OHL).

== Playing career ==
=== Junior ===
Prior to coming to Peterborough, Ontario, to play for the Peterborough Petes, Martschini was a successful player with many teams in Zug, playing in Top Mini, Elite Novizen, Elite Jr. A, and Top Junioren leagues with teams varying from under-15 to under-20. He also represented his country, Switzerland, in various junior world championships, before being drafted in the 2010 CHL Import Draft by the Petes.

When he arrived in the OHL for the 2010–11 season, Martschini was a top player for the Petes, notching 20 goals and 38 assists for a total of 58 points in 61 games, just shy of a point-per-game. He had only 12 penalty minutes, but was a -35. He was one of the Petes' top players and put out an excellent showing as a rookie on a team that boasted players like Matt Puempel and Ryan Spooner. Both were selected in the 2011 NHL entry draft, by the Ottawa Senators and Boston Bruins, respectively, but Martschini was passed over.

He returned to Peterborough for 2011–12. Playing in 63 games as a 19-year-old, he notched 21 goals and 35 assists for 56 points, along with eight penalty minutes and a -13. This would be his last year playing in the OHL.

=== Professional ===
Martschini left for his native country to play for EV Zug in the National League A, for the 2012–13. He played well in his limited time (39 games), putting up 17 goals and 13 assists for a total of 30 points. He had only 4 penalty minutes and was a +5 rating, for an excellent rookie season.

In the 2013–14, Martschini played more games, but was only able to score 27 points in 50 games (15 goals, 12 assists) in his sophomore year, with just two penalty minutes and a +3.

Prior to the 2015–16 season, Martschini agreed to a four-year contract extension with EV Zug worth CHF 2.5 million. At the end of the 2015–16 season, he was selected to play in the 2016 World Championship with the Swiss national team. He played 4 of the team's 7 games, tallying only 1 assist.

On 23 August 2019 Martschini was signed to an early three-year contract extension by Zug worth CHF 2.175 million through the 2022/23 season.

== Career statistics ==
=== Regular season and playoffs ===
			Regular season					Playoffs
Season	Team	League	GP	G	A	Pts	PIM	GP	G	A	Pts	PIM
2008–09	EV Zug	Elite Jr. A	3	0	0	0	0	—	—	—	—	—
2009–10	EV Zug	Elite Jr. A	17	14	13	27	2	7	7	2	9	8
2010–11	Peterborough Petes	OHL	61	20	38	58	12	—	—	—	—	—
2011–12	Peterborough Petes	OHL	63	21	35	56	8	—	—	—	—	—
2012–13	EV Zug	Elite Jr. A	1	0	0	0	0	—	—	—	—	—
2012–13	EV Zug	NLA	39	17	13	30	4	14	4	10	14	0
2013–14	EV Zug	NLA	50	15	12	27	2	—	—	—	—	—
2014–15	EV Zug	NLA	50	23	24	47	2	6	1	4	5	0
2015–16	EV Zug	NLA	50	26	28	54	6	4	0	5	5	0
2016–17	EV Zug	NLA	50	23	26	49	6	16	1	9	10	4
2017–18	EV Zug	NL	46	15	17	32	6	5	1	1	2	6
2018–19	EV Zug	NL	50	22	22	44	6	14	7	10	17	0
2019–20	EV Zug	NL	49	10	26	36	2	—	—	—	—	—
2020–21	EV Zug	NL	49	7	27	34	12	13	5	4	9	0
2021–22	EV Zug	NL	36	14	15	29	4	—	—	—	—	—
NL totals			469	172	210	382	50	72	19	43	62	10

=== International ===
Year	Team	Event	Result	GP	G	A	Pts	PIM
2010	Switzerland	WJC18	5th	6	1	2	3	2
2011	Switzerland	WJC18	7th	6	2	4	6	0
2012	Switzerland	WJC	8th	6	0	1	1	0
2013	Switzerland	WJC	6th	6	1	5	6	0
2016	Switzerland	WC	11th	4	0	1	1	0
2019	Switzerland	WC	8th	8	1	6	7	0
Junior totals				24	4	12	16	2
Senior totals				12	1	7	8	0

Personal Life Lino is married to Cynthia Shaw since 2016. They share two kids.
