= Šimon Hrubec =

Czech ice hockey player (born 1991)

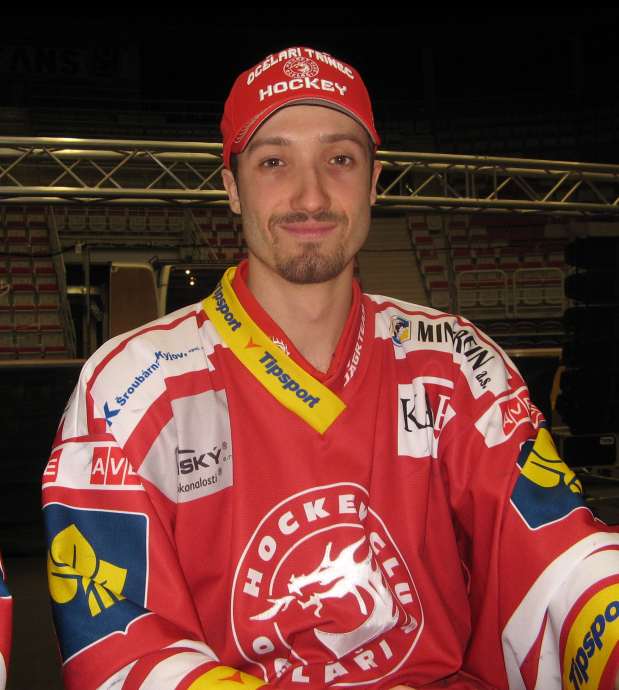
- Born: June 30, 1991 (age 35) Vimperk, Czechoslovakia
- Height: 6 ft 1 in (185 cm)
- Weight: 192 lb (87 kg; 13 st 10 lb)
- Position: Goaltender
- Catches: Left
- NL team Former teams: ZSC Lions; HC České Budějovice; HC Oceláři Třinec; Kunlun Red Star; Avangard Omsk
- National team: Czech Republic
- Playing career: 2009–present

Šimon Hrubec (born June 30, 1991) is a Czech professional ice hockey goaltender. He is currently playing with ZSC Lions in the National League (NL).

== Playing career ==
Hrubec played with HC České Budějovice in the Czech Extraliga during the 2010–11 Czech Extraliga season. He later joined HC Oceláři Třinec in 2012.

After eight seasons with Oceláři Třinec, Hrubec left the Czech Republic as a free agent. On 14 June 2019, he opted to sign a one-year contract with Chinese club Kunlun Red Star of the KHL.

After ten games with Kunlun into his second season with the club in the 2020–21 campaign, Hrubec was traded to contending Russian club, Avangard Omsk, in exchange for financial compensation on 6 November 2020.

After two highly successful seasons as Avangard's starting goaltender, Hrubec opted to continue his career in Switzerland by joining ZSC Lions of the NL on a two-year contract on 1 June 2022.

== Awards and honors ==
| Award | Year |
|---|---|
KHL
| Gagarin Cup (Avangard Omsk) | 2021 |
