= Andrea Glauser =

Swiss ice hockey player (born 1996)

- Born: 3 April 1996 (age 30) Zauggenried, Switzerland
- Height: 5 ft 11 in (180 cm)
- Position: Defence
- Shoots: Right
- NL team Former teams: HC Fribourg-Gottéron; HC Thurgau; SCL Tigers; Lausanne HC
- National team: Switzerland
- Playing career: 2015–present

Andrea-Noah Glauser (born 3 April 1996) is a Swiss professional ice hockey player who is a defenceman for HC Fribourg-Gottéron in the National League (NL). He previously played with the SCL Tigers and Lausanne HC.

== Playing career ==
Glauser completed all youth levels at HC Fribourg-Gottéron and made his debut in the National League A (NLA) in the 2015/16 season. He also gained additional playing experience with National League B (NLB) teams through B-license agreements between Fribourg-Gottéron and HC Ajoie as well as HC Thurgau.

In early November 2017, the SCL Tigers announced they had signed Glauser for the 2018/19 season. For the 2021/22 season, he would be signed by Lausanne HC, with whom he became runner-up in the 2024 and 2025 spring seasons. The following summer, Glauser's return to his former club in Fribourg was announced, where he signed a seven-year contract beginning in the 2025/26 season.

== International play ==
Medal record

Men's ice hockey

Representing Switzerland

World Championship
Silver medal – second place	2024 Czech Republic	
Silver medal – second place	2025 Sweden/Denmark	

Glauser played for Switzerland at the U16, U17, and U20 levels. In autumn 2018, he received his first call-up to the senior national team to participate in the Deutschland Cup. At the 2024 and 2025 World Championships, he won the silver medal with the team, after failing to win a medal in 2022 and 2023. In early 2026, Glauser was selected to Switzerland's roster for the 2026 Winter Olympics, later being named an alternate captain.
