= Dominik Schlumpf =

Swiss ice hockey player

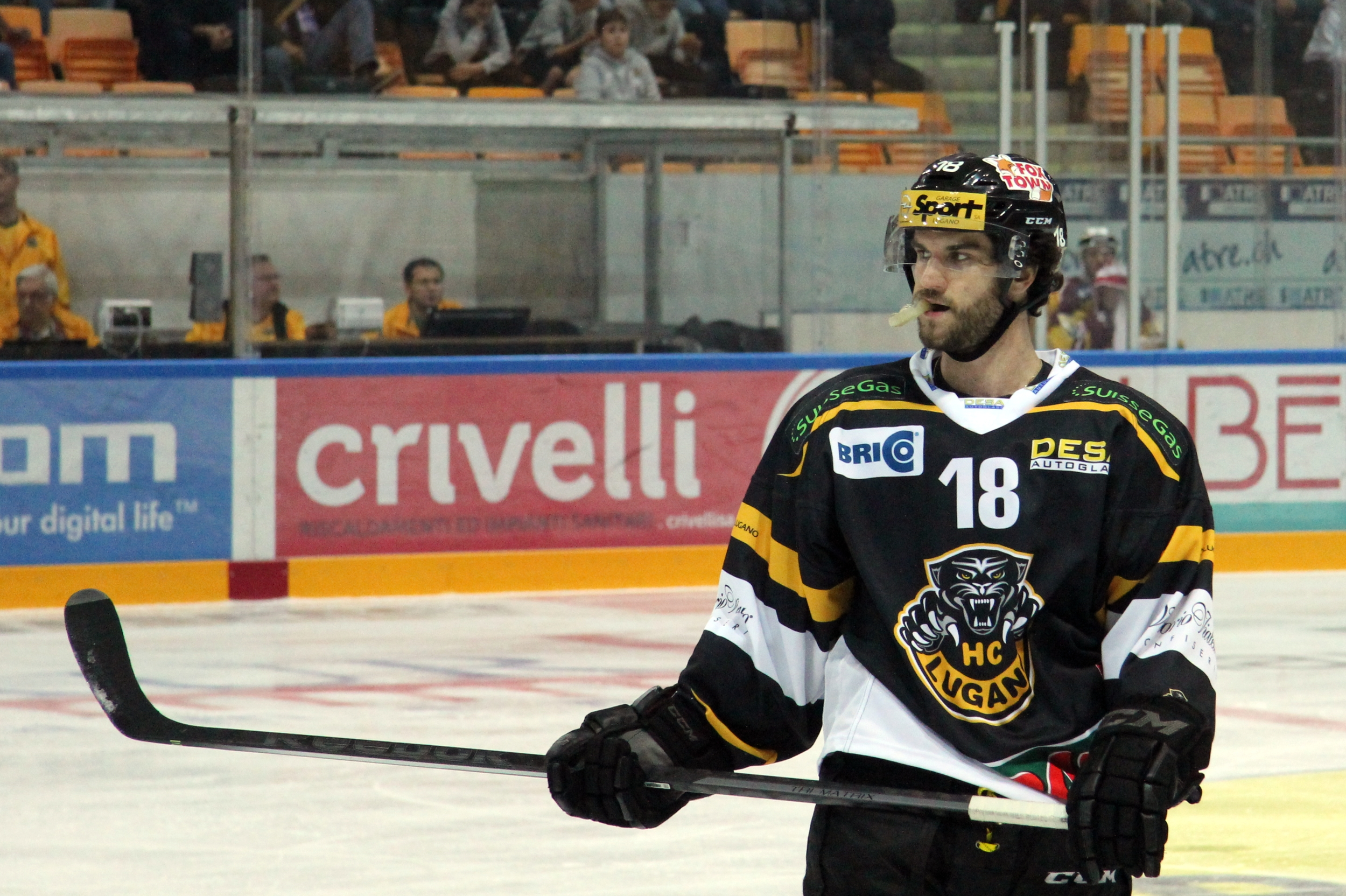
- Schlumpf with HC Lugano in 2014
- Born: March 3, 1991 (age 35) Mönchaltorf, Switzerland
- Height: 6 ft 0 in (183 cm)
- Weight: 174 lb (79 kg; 12 st 6 lb)
- Position: Defence
- Shoots: Right
- NL team Former teams: EV Zug; HC Lugano; SC Bern
- National team: Switzerland
- NHL draft: Undrafted
- Playing career: 2011–present

Dominik Schlumpf (born March 3, 1991) is a Swiss professional ice hockey defenceman who currently plays for EV Zug of the National League (NL).

== Playing career ==
Undrafted, Schlumpf played three seasons of major junior hockey with the Shawinigan Cataractes of the Quebec Major Junior Hockey League from 2008–2011, before returning to Switzerland and making his professional debut with the HC Lugano in the 2011–12 season.

During the 2016–17 season, while in his third season with Zug, Schulmpf agreed to a two-year contract extension through to 2019 on October 14, 2016.

== Career statistics ==
=== Regular season and playoffs ===
| | | | Regular season | | | | | Playoffs |
| Season | Team | League | GP | G | A | Pts | PIM | GP | G | A | Pts | PIM |
|---|---|---|---|---|---|---|---|---|---|---|---|---|
| 2006–07 | ZSC Lions | SUI U17 | 23 | 6 | 4 | 10 | 34 | 5 | 2 | 0 | 2 | 12 |
| 2006–07 | ZSC Lions | SUI.2 U20 | 19 | 1 | 3 | 4 | 12 | — | — | — | — | — |
| 2007–08 | ZSC Lions | SUI U17 | 11 | 3 | 3 | 6 | 18 | 12 | 3 | 4 | 7 | 14 |
| 2007–08 | GCK Lions | SUI U20 | 35 | 2 | 8 | 10 | 24 | 6 | 1 | 2 | 3 | 2 |
| 2008–09 | Shawinigan Cataractes | QMJHL | 22 | 0 | 3 | 3 | 8 | — | — | — | — | — |
| 2009–10 | Shawinigan Cataractes | QMJHL | 61 | 1 | 11 | 12 | 31 | 6 | 1 | 2 | 3 | 4 |
| 2010–11 | Shawinigan Cataractes | QMJHL | 56 | 2 | 10 | 12 | 17 | 12 | 0 | 0 | 0 | 4 |
| 2011–12 | HC Lugano | NLA | 16 | 0 | 2 | 2 | 8 | 6 | 0 | 1 | 1 | 2 |
| 2011–12 | SC Bern | NLA | 1 | 0 | 0 | 0 | 0 | — | — | — | — | — |
| 2011–12 | EHC Basel | NLB | 3 | 0 | 0 | 0 | 0 | — | — | — | — | — |
| 2012–13 | HC Lugano | NLA | 50 | 2 | 8 | 10 | 26 | 7 | 0 | 0 | 0 | 0 |
| 2013–14 | HC Lugano | NLA | 47 | 3 | 7 | 10 | 16 | 4 | 1 | 0 | 1 | 2 |
| 2014–15 | HC Lugano | NLA | 18 | 0 | 4 | 4 | 0 | — | — | — | — | — |
| 2014–15 | EV Zug | NLA | 32 | 1 | 9 | 10 | 6 | 6 | 0 | 1 | 1 | 2 |
| 2015–16 | EV Zug | NLA | 49 | 0 | 7 | 7 | 14 | 4 | 1 | 1 | 2 | 2 |
| 2016–17 | EV Zug | NLA | 41 | 1 | 10 | 11 | 35 | 16 | 0 | 1 | 1 | 14 |
| 2017–18 | EV Zug | NL | 42 | 5 | 4 | 9 | 24 | 5 | 0 | 1 | 1 | 4 |
| 2018–19 | EV Zug | NL | 45 | 2 | 4 | 6 | 48 | 14 | 0 | 1 | 1 | 10 |
| 2019–20 | EV Zug | NL | 48 | 1 | 8 | 9 | 14 | — | — | — | — | — |
| 2020–21 | EV Zug | NL | 42 | 0 | 5 | 5 | 38 | 13 | 0 | 0 | 0 | 0 |
| 2021–22 | EV Zug | NL | 47 | 5 | 11 | 16 | 16 | 14 | 0 | 2 | 2 | 4 |
| NL totals | | | 478 | 20 | 79 | 99 | 245 | 89 | 2 | 8 | 10 | 40 |

=== International ===
| Year | Team | Event | Result | GP | G | A | Pts | PIM |
|---|---|---|---|---|---|---|---|---|
| 2008 | Switzerland | WJC18 | 8th | 6 | 1 | 1 | 2 | 4 |
| 2010 | Switzerland | WJC | 4th | 7 | 1 | 1 | 2 | 6 |
| 2011 | Switzerland | WJC | 5th | 6 | 1 | 0 | 1 | 2 |
| 2014 | Switzerland | WC | 10th | 7 | 1 | 0 | 1 | 4 |
| 2017 | Switzerland | WC | 6th | 2 | 0 | 1 | 1 | 0 |
| 2018 | Switzerland | OG | 10th | 4 | 0 | 0 | 0 | 2 |
| Junior totals | | | | 19 | 3 | 2 | 5 | 12 |
| Senior totals | | | | 13 | 1 | 1 | 2 | 6 |
