= Samuel Walser =

Swiss professional ice hockey center (born 1992)

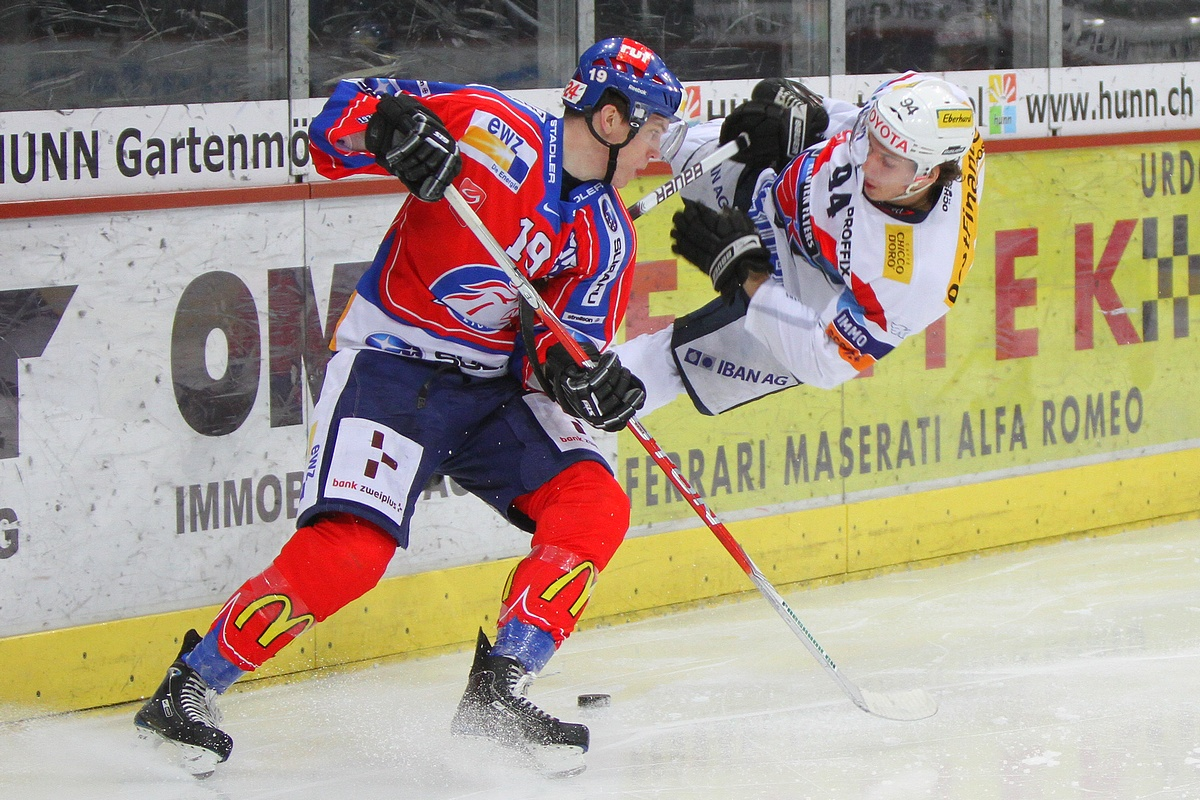
- Born: June 5, 1992 (age 33); Olten, Switzerland
- Height: 6 ft 3 in (191 cm)
- Weight: 209 lb (95 kg; 14 st 13 lb)
- Position: Centre
- Shoots: Left
- NL team Former teams: HC Fribourg-Gottéron; Kloten Flyers; HC Davos
- National team: Switzerland
- Playing career: 2010–present

Samuel Walser (born June 5, 1992) is a Swiss professional ice hockey center. He is currently playing for HC Fribourg-Gottéron of Switzerland's National League (NL).

== Playing career ==
He previously played as a youth and made his professional debut with the Kloten Flyers. On May 14, 2013, Walser left the Kloten Flyers to sign a multi-year contract with HC Davos.

After five seasons with Davos, Walser left as a free agent, signing a four-year contract with his third Swiss club, HC Fribourg-Gottéron, starting from the 2018–19 season.

== International play ==
Walser participated at the 2012 World Junior Ice Hockey Championships as a member of the Switzerland men's national junior ice hockey team.

== Career statistics ==
=== Regular season and playoffs ===
			Regular season					Playoffs
Season	Team	League	GP	G	A	Pts	PIM	GP	G	A	Pts	PIM
2010–11	Kloten Flyers	NLA	20	1	0	1	6	17	1	1	2	2
2011–12	Kloten Flyers	NLA	46	11	1	12	12	5	0	0	0	10
2012–13	Kloten Flyers	NLA	48	7	5	12	40	—	—	—	—	—
2013–14	HC Davos	NLA	50	9	10	19	18	6	0	0	0	4
2014–15	HC Davos	NLA	47	6	7	13	20	15	3	3	6	6
2015–16	HC Davos	NLA	50	11	12	23	24	8	1	1	2	4
2016–17	HC Davos	NLA	50	5	9	14	14	10	1	0	1	2
2017–18	HC Davos	NL	49	8	8	16	24	5	2	0	2	0
2018–19	HC Fribourg-Gottéron	NL	50	3	16	19	26	—	—	—	—	—
2019–20	HC Fribourg-Gottéron	NL	44	4	7	11	28	—	—	—	—	—
2020–21	HC Fribourg-Gottéron	NL	51	8	14	22	38	3	0	2	2	2
2021–22	HC Fribourg-Gottéron	NL	47	10	10	20	24	9	1	1	2	6
2022–23	HC Fribourg-Gottéron	NL	50	5	3	8	20	2	0	0	0	0
NL totals			602	88	102	190	294	80	9	8	17	36

=== International ===
Year	Team	Event	Result	GP	G	A	Pts	PIM
2009	Switzerland	WJC18	8th	6	1	1	2	8
2011	Switzerland	WJC	5th	6	1	0	1	4
2012	Switzerland	WJC	8th	6	0	1	1	6
2016	Switzerland	WC	11th	7	2	0	2	6
Junior totals				18	2	2	4	18
Senior totals				7	2	0	2	6
