= Lukas Frick =

Swiss ice hockey player

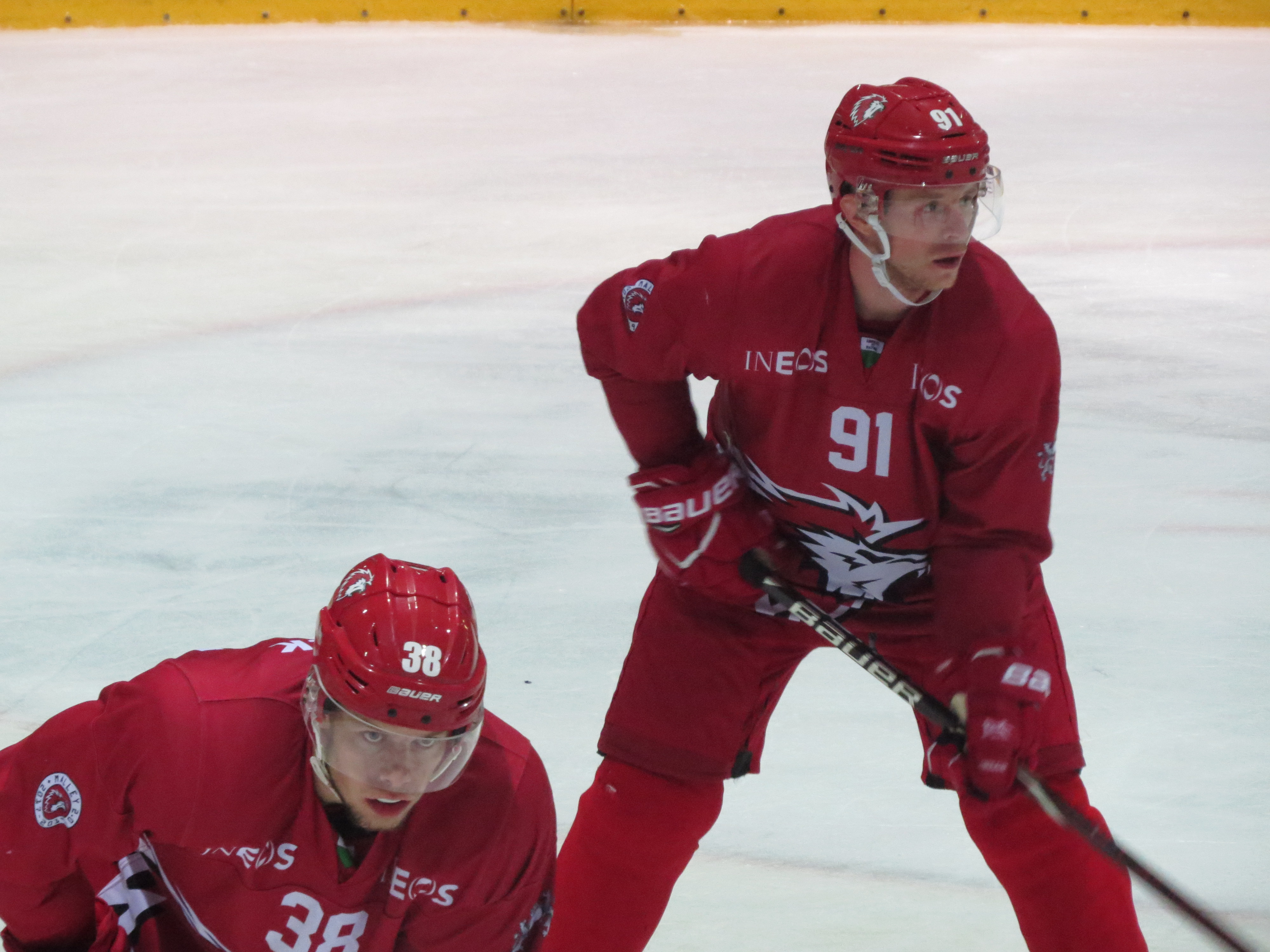
- Born: September 15, 1994 (age 31) Zuzwil, Switzerland
- Height: 6 ft 2 in (188 cm)
- Weight: 195 lb (88 kg; 13 st 13 lb)
- Position: Defence
- Shoots: Left
- NL team Former teams: Lausanne HC; EHC Kloten
- National team: Switzerland
- Playing career: 2012–present

Lukas Frick (born September 15, 1994) is a Swiss professional ice hockey defenceman for Lausanne HC of the National League (NL). He previously played with EHC Kloten.

== Playing career ==
Frick made his National League debut with EHC Kloten during the 2012–13 season. He went on to play 5 seasons with the team, winning the 2017 Swiss Cup.

On April 10, 2017, Frick joined Lausanne HC on a four-year deal worth CHF 2 million.

On September 24, 2020, Frick was signed to a four-year contract extension by Lausanne HC.

== International play ==
Medal record

Representing Switzerland

Ice hockey

World Championships
Silver medal – second place	2018 Denmark	
Silver medal – second place	2026 Switzerland	

Frick was named to Switzerland men's national team for the 2018 and 2019 IIHF World Championship.

== Career statistics ==
=== Regular season and playoffs ===
			Regular season					Playoffs
Season	Team	League	GP	G	A	Pts	PIM	GP	G	A	Pts	PIM
2010–11	EHC Uzwil	Div.1	25	3	4	7	10	4	0	2	2	4
2011–12	EHC Uzwil	Div.1	26	2	4	6	6	—	—	—	—	—
2012–13	Kloten Flyers	Elite Jr. A	31	9	13	22	10	8	3	4	7	2
2012–13	Kloten Flyers	NLA	21	1	2	3	4	—	—	—	—	—
2013–14	Kloten Flyers	Elite Jr. A	8	1	4	5	8	4	0	0	0	2
2013–14	Kloten Flyers	NLA	34	1	2	3	4	16	0	0	0	4
2014–15	Kloten Flyers	NLA	49	2	6	8	4	—	—	—	—	—
2015–16	Kloten Flyers	NLA	50	4	15	19	2	4	2	0	2	0
2016–17	EHC Kloten	NLA	48	2	16	18	8	—	—	—	—	—
2017–18	Lausanne HC	NL	49	4	10	14	6	—	—	—	—	—
2018–19	Lausanne HC	NL	50	3	13	16	16	12	1	3	4	0
2019–20	Lausanne HC	NL	50	2	23	25	10	—	—	—	—	—
2020–21	Lausanne HC	NL	51	8	15	23	12	6	1	2	3	0
2021–22	Lausanne HC	NL	51	5	23	28	8	8	2	2	4	2
2022–23	Lausanne HC	NL	52	6	11	17	4	—	—	—	—	—
NL totals			505	38	136	174	78	46	6	7	13	6

=== International ===
Year	Team	Event	Result	GP	G	A	Pts	PIM
2014	Switzerland	WJC	7th	5	0	0	0	2
2018	Switzerland	WC	2nd place, silver medalist(s)	10	0	0	0	0
2019	Switzerland	WC	8th	8	1	1	2	0
2021	Switzerland	WC	6th	1	0	0	0	0
2022	Switzerland	OG	8th	5	0	0	0	0
2026	Switzerland	WC	2nd place, silver medalist(s)	1	0	0	0	0
Junior totals				5	0	0	0	2
Senior totals				25	1	1	2	0
