= Colton Sceviour =

Canadian ice hockey player (born 1989)

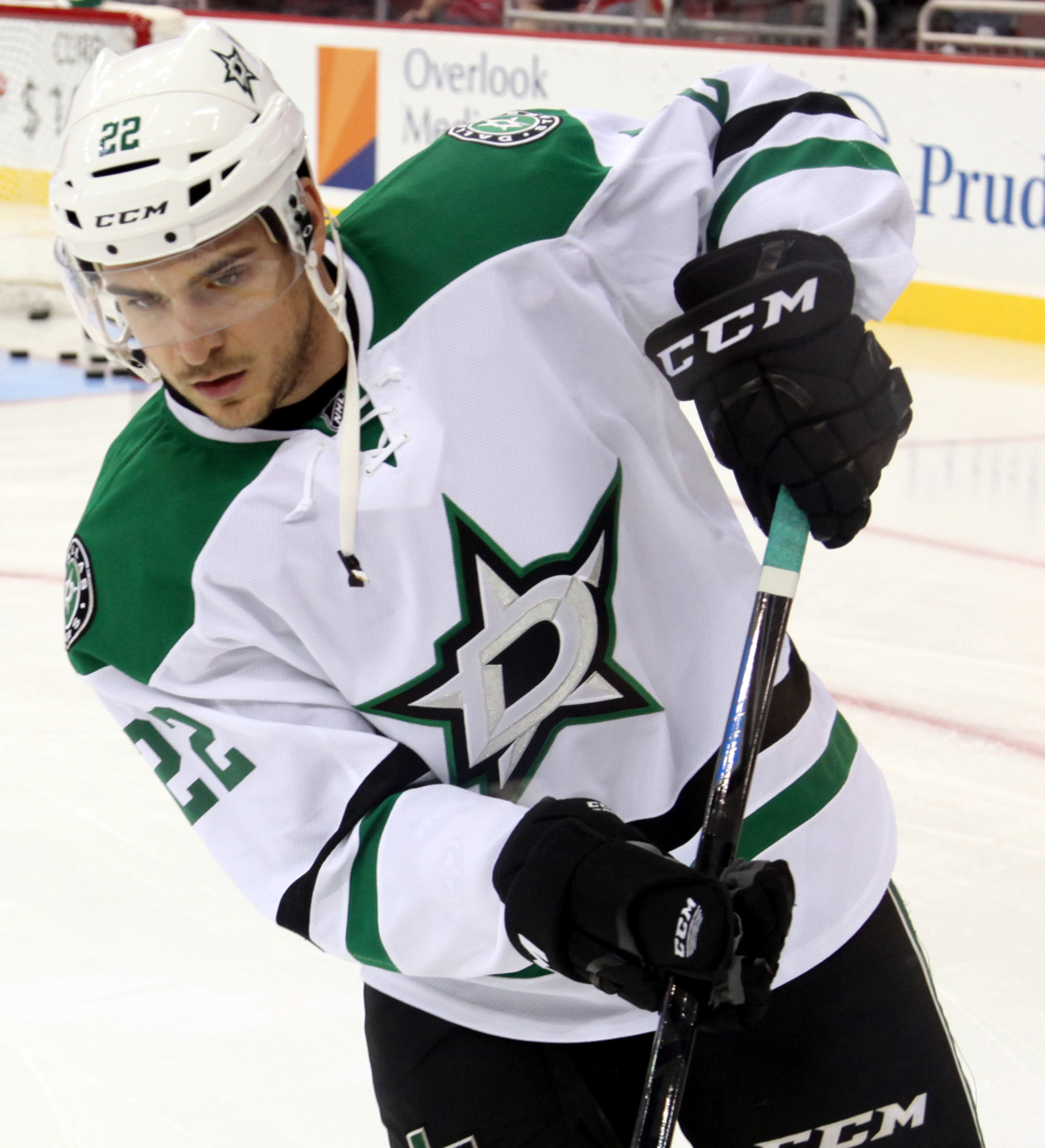
- Sceviour with the Dallas Stars in 2014
- Born: April 20, 1989 (age 37) Red Deer, Alberta, Canada
- Height: 6 ft 0 in (183 cm)
- Weight: 190 lb (86 kg; 13 st 8 lb)
- Position: Right wing/Centre
- Shoots: Right
- team Former teams: Free agent Dallas Stars; Florida Panthers; Pittsburgh Penguins; Edmonton Oilers; SC Bern
- NHL draft: 112th overall, 2007; Dallas Stars
- Playing career: 2009–present

Colton Sceviour (born April 20, 1989) is a Canadian professional ice hockey right winger who is currently a free agent. He was selected by the Dallas Stars in the fourth round, 112th overall, at the 2007 NHL entry draft.

== Early life ==
Sceviour was born on April 20, 1989, in Red Deer, Alberta, Canada. His father Darin played hockey growing up, including one game in the NHL for the Chicago Blackhawks.

== Playing career ==
Growing up in Alberta, Sceviour played minor ice hockey for the Tinners Little Caps, winning back to back Novice Tier I Red Deer Minor Hockey league championships in 1998 and 1999. In 2000, Sceviour played atom AA hockey for the Red Deer Titan Electric Chiefs whom won the B final at the St Alberta atom AA hockey tournament. He moved up the ranks of minor hockey and in 2003 became the youngest player on the Red Deer AAA bantam Rebels roster.

Sceviour played midget AAA ice hockey for the Optimist Rebels as a 15-year-old before joining the Portland Winterhawks full-time the following season. In his rookie season with the Winterhawks, he suffered a broken jaw during a game against the Spokane Chiefs and was ineligible to play for Team Canada at the World U-17 Hockey Challenge. He returned to the Winterhawks for his sophomore season and recorded seven goals and 30 points in 37 games before suffering a broken foot. The 2006–07 season would be his last full season with the Winterhawks as he was traded to the Lethbridge Hurricanes alongside Nick Hotson and Lucas Alexiuk in November 2007.

=== Professional ===
==== Dallas Stars ====
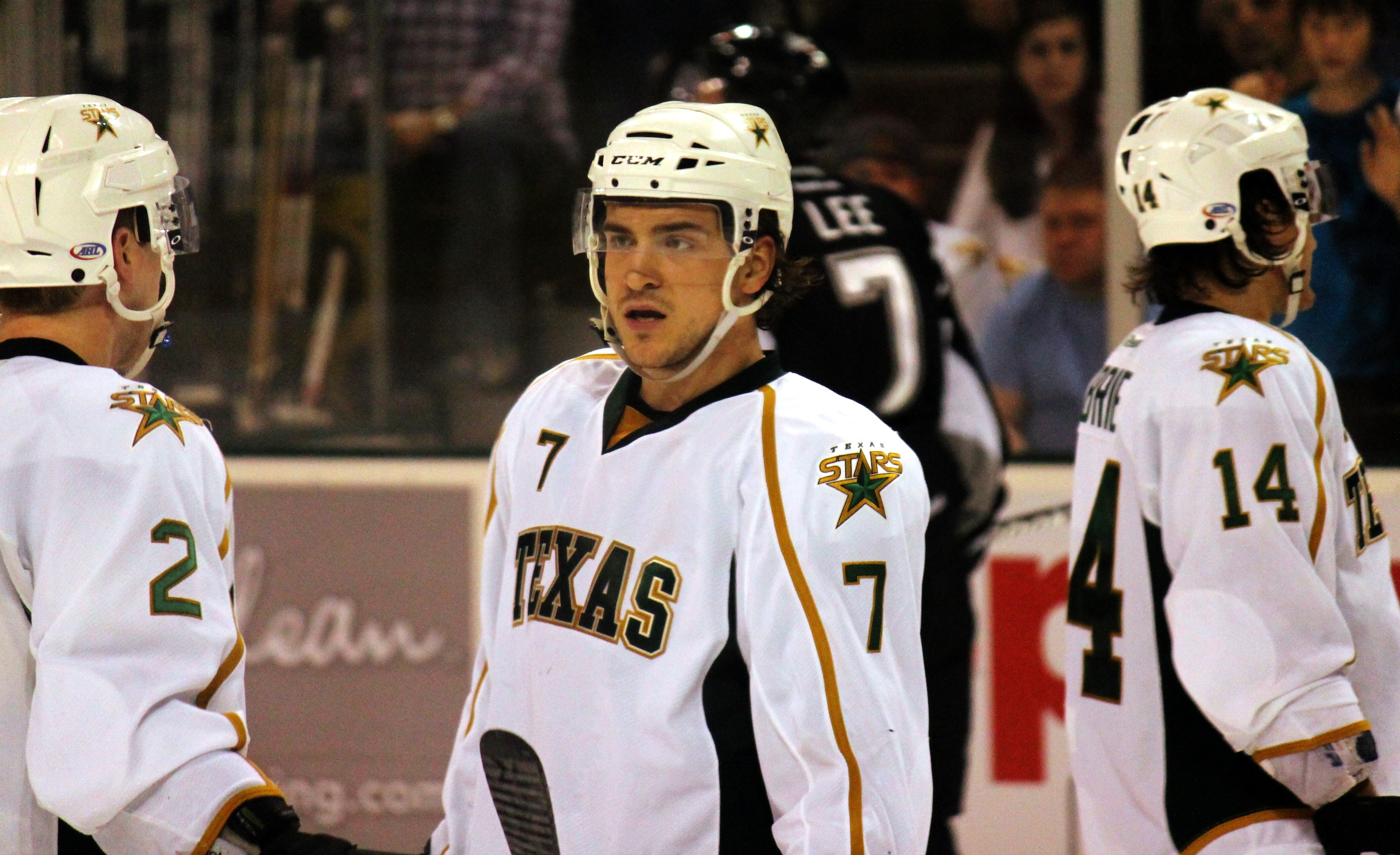
Sceviour in 2013.

Sceviour completed his major junior ice hockey career by signing a three-year contract with the Texas Stars, Dallas' American Hockey League (AHL) affiliate, for the 2009–10 AHL season.

Sceviour was called up from the Texas Stars, Dallas' American Hockey League (AHL) affiliate, to join the Dallas Stars when Rich Peverley was unable to play. He recorded his first career NHL goal in his season debut with Dallas on December 14, 2013, against Ondřej Pavelec of the Winnipeg Jets.

==== Florida Panthers ====
After seven seasons within the Stars organization, Sceviour left as a free agent and signed a two-year contract with the Florida Panthers on July 1, 2016. He was named to their opening night roster and scored his first goal with the team a few days later. By the end of October, Sceviour has recorded five goals and was tied for second in the league.

On February 12, 2018, Sceviour signed a three-year, $3.6 million contract extension with the Panthers. At the time of his signing, he had recorded 38 points in 126 games with the team and logged the second most short-handed ice time among all Panthers forwards Upon signing his extension, Sceviour said he chose to remain with the team due to their promising future. He concluded the season with 24 points in 76 games.

The following season, Sceviour's playing time was greatly reduced and he skated in only 56 games for the Panthers. On February 10, 2019, Sceviour was placed on injured reserve by the Panthers who also recalled Jamie McGinn to replace him in the lineup.

==== Pittsburgh Penguins ====
After four seasons with the Panthers, on September 24, 2020, Sceviour was traded to the Pittsburgh Penguins, along with Mike Matheson, in exchange for Patric Hörnqvist. He was placed on waivers by the Penguins on April 10, 2021, in order to allow them to move him to the taxi squad or Wilkes-Barre/Scranton Penguins throughout the season. After passing waivers, he scored two goals for the team in a 5–2 win over the New Jersey Devils.

==== Edmonton Oilers ====
As a free agent from the Penguins following his lone season with the club, Sceviour went un-signed over the summer, later accepting a professional try-out contract to attend the Edmonton Oilers training camp for the 2021–22 season on September 16, 2021. He successfully made the team, signing a one-year contract on October 13, 2021.

==== SC Bern ====
After his season in Edmonton, Sceviour left the Oilers, and went overseas to sign a one-year contract with Swiss club, SC Bern of the National League on August 15, 2022.

After a productive 2022-23 season saw him score 19 goals and 19 assists for 38 points in 49 games, Sceviour inked a one-year extension with the club.

Injuries plagued his second year with the club, and despite finishing 2nd on the team in playoff points, Sceviour and the club decided to part ways at the end of the season.

== Personal life ==
Sceviour and his wife have two children together.

== Career statistics ==
			Regular season					Playoffs
Season	Team	League	GP	G	A	Pts	PIM	GP	G	A	Pts	PIM
2002–03	Red Deer Chiefs	AMBHL	35	16	12	28	20	—	—	—	—	—
2004–05	Portland Winter Hawks	WHL	6	1	0	1	6	4	0	0	0	0
2005–06	Portland Winter Hawks	WHL	58	3	6	9	25	12	0	1	1	4
2006–07	Portland Winter Hawks	WHL	49	12	26	38	38	—	—	—	—	—
2007–08	Portland Winter Hawks	WHL	17	2	8	10	9	—	—	—	—	—
2007–08	Lethbridge Hurricanes	WHL	52	31	23	54	36	19	3	10	13	15
2008–09	Lethbridge Hurricanes	WHL	69	29	51	80	48	11	4	3	7	12
2009–10	Texas Stars	AHL	80	9	22	31	19	24	1	7	8	12
2010–11	Texas Stars	AHL	77	16	25	41	17	6	1	0	1	0
2010–11	Dallas Stars	NHL	1	0	0	0	0	—	—	—	—	—
2011–12	Texas Stars	AHL	75	21	32	53	25	—	—	—	—	—
2012–13	Texas Stars	AHL	62	21	31	52	20	9	1	3	4	4
2012–13	Dallas Stars	NHL	1	0	1	1	0	—	—	—	—	—
2013–14	Texas Stars	AHL	54	32	31	63	31	—	—	—	—	—
2013–14	Dallas Stars	NHL	26	8	4	12	4	6	1	2	3	0
2014–15	Dallas Stars	NHL	71	9	17	26	13	—	—	—	—	—
2015–16	Dallas Stars	NHL	71	11	12	23	21	11	2	3	5	0
2016–17	Florida Panthers	NHL	80	9	15	24	25	—	—	—	—	—
2017–18	Florida Panthers	NHL	76	11	13	24	24	—	—	—	—	—
2018–19	Florida Panthers	NHL	59	5	10	15	15	—	—	—	—	—
2019–20	Florida Panthers	NHL	69	6	10	16	6	2	0	0	0	0
2020–21	Pittsburgh Penguins	NHL	46	5	5	10	2	—	—	—	—	—
2021–22	Edmonton Oilers	NHL	35	2	3	5	26	—	—	—	—	—
2021–22	Bakersfield Condors	AHL	22	6	5	11	21	—	—	—	—	—
NHL totals			535	66	90	156	136	19	3	5	8	0

== Awards and honours ==
Award	Year
AHL
First All-Star Team	2013–14
