= 2021–22 National League (ice hockey) season =

2021–22 National League season
- League: National League
- Sport: Ice hockey
- Duration: September 7, 2021 – March 14, 2022
- Number of games: 52
- Number of teams: 13

Regular season
- Best record: EV Zug
- Runners-up: Fribourg-Gottéron
- Top scorer: Roman Červenka

Playoffs

Swiss champion NL
- Champions: EV Zug (3rd title)
- Runners-up: ZSC Lions

National League seasons
- ← 2020–21 2022–23 →

The 2021–22 National League season was the 84th season of Swiss professional ice hockey and the fifth season as the National League (NL).

EV Zug defended their title after beating ZSC Lions in the finals 4–3.

13 teams participated in the season as HC Ajoie was promoted to the National League after winning 2020–21 Swiss League.

== Teams ==
NL teams for the 2021–22 season

Team	City	Arena	Capacity	COVID-19 Capacity
HC Ajoie	Porrentruy	Raiffeisen Arena	4,671	0
HC Ambrì-Piotta	Ambrì	Valascia	6,500	0
SC Bern	Bern	PostFinance Arena	17,031	0
EHC Biel	Biel/Bienne	Tissot Arena	6,521	0
HC Davos	Davos	Eisstadion Davos	6,800	0
Fribourg-Gottéron	Fribourg	BCF Arena	8,934	0
Genève-Servette HC	Geneva	Patinoire des Vernets	7,135	0
Lausanne HC	Lausanne	Vaudoise Aréna	9,600	0
HC Lugano	Lugano	Cornér Arena	7,800	0
SCL Tigers	Langnau im Emmental	Ilfis Stadium	6,000	0
SC Rapperswil-Jona Lakers	Rapperswil	St. Galler Kantonalbank Arena	6,200	0
ZSC Lions	Zürich	Hallenstadion	11,200	0
EV Zug	Zug	Bossard Arena	7,200	0

== Regular season ==
=== Standings ===
Pos	Team	Pld	W	OTW	OTL	L	GF	GA	GD	PCT	Qualification
1	EV Zug	52	24	12	4	12	177	127	+50	.641	Advance to Playoffs
2	Fribourg-Gottéron	50	26	6	4	14	159	124	+35	.627	Advance to Playoffs
3	ZSC Lions	52	26	6	6	14	169	130	+39	.615	Advance to Playoffs
4	SC Rapperswil-Jona Lakers	52	28	3	4	17	164	135	+29	.603	Advance to Playoffs
5	HC Davos	51	27	3	1	20	148	125	+23	.575	Advance to Playoffs
6	EHC Biel	51	24	5	5	17	154	128	+26	.569	Advance to Playoffs
7	Lausanne HC	51	27	1	4	19	155	143	+12	.569	Advance to Pre-playoffs
8	Genève-Servette HC	52	23	6	7	16	151	130	+21	.564	Advance to Pre-playoffs
9	HC Lugano	52	21	4	5	22	160	158	+2	.487	Advance to Pre-playoffs
10	HC Ambrì-Piotta	52	19	3	3	27	131	145	−14	.423	Advance to Pre-playoffs
11	SC Bern	52	17	3	8	24	136	148	−12	.417	
12	SCL Tigers	50	9	2	4	35	129	205	−76	.233	
13	HC Ajoie	51	6	3	2	40	89	224	−135	.170	

Source: NLA
Rules for classification: 1) points per game 2) greater number of games played 3) greater number of away games played 4) head-to-head points

=== Statistics ===
==== Scoring leaders ====
The following shows the top ten players who led the league in points, at the conclusion of the regular season. If two or more skaters are tied (i.e. same number of points, goals and played games), all of the tied skaters are shown.

Player	Team	GP	G	A	Pts	+/–	PIM
(Czech Republic) Roman Červenka	SC Rapperswil-Jona Lakers	52	20	44	64	+8	30
(Sweden) Henrik Tömmernes	Genève-Servette HC	51	10	48	58	+19	40
(Canada) Daniel Winnik	Genève-Servette HC	48	25	29	54	+8	86
(Canada) Chris DiDomenico	HC Fribourg-Gottéron	49	15	39	54	+9	92
(Switzerland) Denis Malgin	ZSC Lions	48	21	31	52	+18	49
(United States) Mark Arcobello	HC Lugano	52	22	29	51	-7	41
(Sweden) Jesper Olofsson	SCL Tigers	43	25	25	50	+1	4
(Sweden) Mathias Bromé	HC Davos	41	14	35	49	+19	14
(Finland) Toni Rajala	EHC Biel-Bienne	51	22	26	48	+18	10
(Canada) Alexandre Grenier	SCL Tigers	47	13	35	48	-11	47

==== Leading goaltenders ====
The following shows the top ten goaltenders who led the league in goals against average, provided that they have played at least 40% of their team's minutes, at the conclusion of the regular season.

Player	Team(s)	GP	TOI	GA	Sv%	GAA
(Switzerland) Sandro Aeschlimann	HC Davos	34	1950:10	58	94.16	1.78
(Switzerland) Reto Berra	HC Fribourg-Gottéron	43	2552:01	91	92.78	2.14
(Switzerland) Joren van Pottelberghe	EHC Biel-Bienne	44	2534:21	94	92.07	2.23
(Switzerland) Melvin Nyffeler	SC Rapperswil-Jona Lakers	44	2640:35	98	92.08	2.23
(Switzerland) Ludovic Waeber	ZSC Lions	30	1644:31	65	91.99	2.34
(Switzerland) Leonardo Genoni	EV Zug	40	2406:29	95	92.10	2.37
(Switzerland) Gauthier Descloux	Genève-Servette HC	30	1741:57	69	92.16	2.38
(Switzerland) Philip Wüthrich	SC Bern	39	2299:08	97	92.06	2.53
(Switzerland) Niklas Schlegel	HC Lugano	24	1316:09	56	91.30	2.55
(Switzerland) Luca Boltshauser	Lausanne HC	24	1341:55	57	90.92	2.55

== Playoffs ==
=== Bracket ===
Pre-Playoffs (best-of-3)
7	Lausanne HC	2
10	HC Ambrì-Piotta	1
8	Genève-Servette HC	0
9	HC Lugano	2

Quarter-finals (best-of-7)
1	EV Zug	4
9	HC Lugano	0
2	HC Fribourg-Gottéron	4
7	Lausanne HC	1
3	ZSC Lions	4
6	EHC Biel	3
4	SC Rapperswil-Jona Lakers	3
5	HC Davos	4

Semi-finals (best-of-7)
1	EV Zug	4
5	HC Davos	0
(Pairings are re-seeded after the first and second round)
2	HC Fribourg-Gottéron	0
3	ZSC Lions	4

Finals (best-of-7)
1	EV Zug	4
3	ZSC Lions	3

=== Pre-Playoffs ===
==== (7) Lausanne HC vs. (10) HC Ambrì-Piotta ====
18 March 2022	Lausanne HC	1–2	HC Ambrì-Piotta	Vaudoise Aréna, Prilly, Lausanne	Recap
Jäger (Frick) - 10:26		First period	06:14 - Pestoni (Hietanen, Heim) (PP1)
No scoring		Second period	No scoring
No scoring		Third period	51:08 - McMillan (Pestoni, Zwerger)
Tobias Stephan ( 16 saves / 18 shots )		Goalie stats	Janne Juvonen ( 35 saves / 36 shots )

20 March 2022	HC Ambrì-Piotta	1–2	Lausanne HC	Nuova Valascia, Ambrì	Recap
McMillan (Dotti) - 12:07		First period	10:46 - Sekáč (Fuchs, Gernát) (PP2)
No scoring		Second period	No scoring
No scoring		Third period	42:18 - Sekáč (Riat, Marti)
Janne Juvonen ( 36 saves / 38 shots )		Goalie stats	Luca Boltshauser ( 23 saves / 24 shots )

22 March 2022	Lausanne HC	5–1	HC Ambrì-Piotta	Vaudoise Aréna, Prilly, Lausanne	Recap
Gernát - 07:14		First period	06:06 - Trisconi (Bianchi)
No scoring		Second period	No scoring
Riat (Sekáč) - 45:00; Sekáč (Miele, Heldner) - 58:40; Sekáč (Paré, Miele) - 59:02; Ķēniņš (Jäger, Bertschy) - 59:21		Third period	No scoring
Luca Boltshauser ( 24 saves / 25 shots )		Goalie stats	Janne Juvonen ( 37 saves / 40 shots )

Lausanne HC won the series 2–1

==== (8) Genève-Servette HC vs. (9) HC Lugano ====
18 March 2022	Genève-Servette HC	1–2	HC Lugano	Patinoire des Vernets, Geneva	Recap
Vatanen (Tömmernes, Filppula) (PP1) - 19:43		First period	08:07 - Arcobello (Chiesa) (SH1)
No scoring		Second period	25:47 - Carr (Thürkauf)
No scoring		Third period	No scoring
Gauthier Descloux ( 32 saves / 34 shots )		Goalie stats	Niklas Schlegel ( 43 saves / 44 shots )

20 March 2022	HC Lugano	4–3	OT	Genève-Servette HC	Cornèr Arena, Lugano	Recap
Abdelkader (Riva, Alatalo) - 16:12		First period		No scoring
Thürkauf (Abdelkader, Carr) (PP1) - 29:33		Second period		22:14 - Völlmin (Miranda); 28:47 - Rod (Winnik, Le Coultre) (SH1)
Riva (Abdelkader, Carr) - 46:56		Third period		52:53 - Richard (Vermin, Maurer)
Alatalo (Arcobello) - 62:27		First overtime period		No scoring
Niklas Schlegel ( 37 saves / 40 shots )		Goalie stats		Gauthier Descloux ( 31 saves / 35 shots )

HC Lugano won the series 2–0

=== Quarter-finals ===
==== (1) EV Zug vs. (9) HC Lugano ====
25 March	EV Zug	2–1	OT	HC Lugano	Bossard Arena, Zug	Recap
No scoring		First period		No scoring
Hofmann (Djoos, Simion) (PP1) - 38:38		Second period		No scoring
No scoring		Third period		56:58 - Abdelkader (Alatalo)
Simion (Senteler, Herzog) - 65:07		First overtime period		No scoring
Leonardo Genoni ( 40 saves / 41 shots )		Goalie stats		Niklas Schlegel ( 31 saves / 33 shots )

27 March	HC Lugano	2–6	EV Zug	Cornèr Arena, Lugano	Recap
No scoring		First period	16:03 - Zehnder (Herzog, Hansson)
Morini (Alatalo, Arcobello) (PP1) - 36:50		Second period	No scoring
Arcobello (Thürkauf, Carr) (PP1) - 55:40		Third period	40:35 - Djoos (Jan Kovář, Hansson) (PP2); 41:34 - Herzog (Simion, Djoos) (PP1); 47:28 - Zehnder (Herzog); 50:06 - Herzog (Hofmann, Hansson) (PP2); 59:47 - Allenspach (Zehnder, Leuenberger) (PP1)
Niklas Schlegel ( 27 saves / 33 shots )		Goalie stats	Leonardo Genoni ( 36 saves / 38 shots )

29 March	EV Zug	6–3	HC Lugano	Bossard Arena, Zug	Recap
No scoring		First period	No scoring
Herzog (Jan Kovář, Djoos) (PP1) - 29:11; De Nisco (Allenspach, Leuenberger) - 33:34		Second period	21:45 - Bertaggia (Herren); 22:43 - Morini (Abdelkader, Arcobello)
Allenspach (Leuenberger, Hansson) - 44:05; Jan Kovář (Stadler, Hofmann) - 51:14; Bachofner (Lander, Müller) - 52:20; Senteler (Müller, Schlumpf) (PP1) - 58:57		Third period	56:14 - Josephs (SH1)
Leonardo Genoni ( 42 saves / 45 shots )		Goalie stats	Niklas Schlegel ( 34 saves / 40 shots )

31 March	HC Lugano	3–5	EV Zug	Cornèr Arena, Lugano	Recap
No scoring		First period	04:48 - Jan Kovář (Djoos) (PP1); 16:44 - Hansson (Jan Kovář) (PP2); 17:06 - Müller (PP1)
No scoring		Second period	26:18 - Senteler (Bachofner); 31:06 - Herzog (Kreis)
Wolf (Thürkauf, Morini) - 48:00; Fazzini (Morini, Alatalo) (PP1) - 50:16; Alatalo (Herren, Herburger) - 52:10		Third period	No scoring
Niklas Schlegel ( 15 saves / 18 shots ) Thibault Fatton ( 3 saves / 5 shots )		Goalie stats	Leonardo Genoni ( 33 saves / 36 shots )

EV Zug won the series 4–0

==== (2) HC Fribourg-Gottéron vs. (7) Lausanne HC ====
25 March	HC Fribourg-Gottéron	2–0	Lausanne HC	BCF Arena, Fribourg	Recap
Mottet (DiDomenico, Diaz) (PP1) - 19:36		First period	No scoring
Bykov (Gunderson) (SH1) - 32:10		Second period	No scoring
No scoring		Third period	No scoring
Reto Berra ( 35 saves / 35 shots )		Goalie stats	Luca Boltshauser ( 21 saves / 23 shots )

27 March	Lausanne HC	5–4	OT	HC Fribourg-Gottéron	Vaudoise Aréna, Prilly, Lausanne	Recap
Gernat (Miele, Stephan) - 05:41; Bozon (Bertschy, Heldner) - 14:47		First period		04:14 - Gunderson (DiDomenico, Desharnais) (PP1); 17:28 - Schmid (Jecker, DiDomenico)
No scoring		Second period		No scoring
Heldner (Bertschy, Glauser) - 46:54; Jäger (Heldner, Frick) - 59:28		Third period		48:00 - Marchon (Sutter, Mottet); 48:59 - Mottet (Furrer, Sutter)
Paré (Bozon, Miele) - 71:05		First overtime period		No scoring
Tobias Stephan ( 35 saves / 39 shots )		Goalie stats		Reto Berra ( 35 saves / 40 shots )

29 March	HC Fribourg-Gottéron	3–2	3OT	Lausanne HC	BCF Arena, Fribourg	Recap
Sprunger (DiDomenico, Gunderson) (PP2) - 11:42; DiDomenico (Desharnais, Mottet) (PP1) - 12:36		First period		No scoring
No scoring		Second period		26:37 - Krakauskas (Douay)
No scoring		Third period		43:38 - Bertschy (Bozon, Heldner)
Furrer - 104:58		Third overtime period		No scoring
Reto Berra ( 49 saves / 51 shots )		Goalie stats		Luca Boltshauser ( 41 saves / 44 shots )

31 March	Lausanne HC	1–4	HC Fribourg-Gottéron	Vaudoise Aréna, Prilly, Lausanne	Recap
No scoring		First period	No scoring
Bertschy - 28:02		Second period	21:08 - Sprunger (Gunderson) (PP1); 25:23 - Schmid (Sprunger); 33:27 - Bykov (Desharnais) (SH1); 36:22 - Jörg (Walser)
No scoring		Third period	No scoring
Tobias Stephan ( 18 saves / 22 shots )		Goalie stats	Reto Berra ( 18 saves / 19 shots )

2 April	HC Fribourg-Gottéron	5–4	OT	Lausanne HC	BCF Arena, Fribourg	Recap
Frick (Paré) - 15:36		First period		14:10 - Sprunger (Gunderson, DiDomenico) (PP1)
Gernát (Ķēniņš, Genazzi) (PP1) - 23:59; Gernát (Ķēniņš, Fuchs) - 34:52		Second period		20:41 - DiDomenico (Desharnais, Mottet) (PP1); 36:26 - DiDomenico (Desharnais, Mottet) (PP1)
Frick (Fuchs) - 43:14		Third period		46:10 - Mottet (Gunderson, DiDomenico) (PP1)
No scoring		First overtime period		78:12 - Mottet (Desharnais)
Reto Berra ( 35 saves / 39 shots )		Goalie stats		Tobias Stephan ( 39 saves / 44 shots )

HC Fribourg-Gottéron won the series 4–1

==== (3) ZSC Lions vs. (6) EHC Biel ====
23 March	ZSC Lions	4–5	EHC Biel	Hallenstadion, Zürich	Recap
Bodenmann (Malgin, Andrighetto) - 12:49		First period	No scoring
Andrighetto (Noreau, Malgin) (PP1) - 39:04		Second period	25:05 - Künzle (SH1); 31:37 - Yakovenko (Rajala) (PP1); 35:24 - Hügli (Hischier, Yakovenko) (PP1)
Noreau (Malgin, Bodenmann) (PP1) - 47:19; Marti - 49:41		Third period	44:28 - Hischier (Rajala); 48:58 - Künzle (Haas)
Jakub Kovář ( 26 saves / 31 shots )		Goalie stats	Dmitry Shikin ( 39 saves / 42 shots )

25 March	EHC Biel	4–3	OT	ZSC Lions	Tissot Arena, Biel/Bienne	Recap
No scoring		First period		No scoring
Künzle (Schläpfer, Hügli) - 38:49		Second period		21:30 - Malgin (Andrighetto, Noreau) (PP1); 29:23 - D. Hollenstein (Geering, Andrighetto); 32:22 - Sigrist (Marti) (SH1)
Sallinen (Lööv) - 42:59; Hofer (Rathgeb, Lööv) - 59:25		Third period		63:06 - Rajala (Lööv, Hügli)
Dmitry Shikin ( 30 saves / 33 shots )		Goalie stats		Jakub Kovář ( 30 saves / 34 shots )

27 March	ZSC Lions	1–0	2OT	EHC Biel	Hallenstadion, Zürich	Recap
No scoring		First period		No scoring
No scoring		Second period		No scoring
No scoring		Third period		No scoring
Baltisberger (Kivistö) - 88:27		Second overtime period		No scoring
Jakub Kovář ( 43 saves / 43 shots )		Goalie stats		Elien Paupe ( 34 saves / 35 shots )

29 March	EHC Biel	0–1	ZSC Lions	Tissot Arena, Biel/Bienne	Recap
No scoring		First period	No scoring
No scoring		Second period	39:01 - Noreau (Andrighetto, Azevedo) (PP1)
No scoring		Third period	No scoring
Dmitry Shikin ( 21 saves / 22 shots )		Goalie stats	Jakub Kovář ( 25 saves / 25 shots )

31 March	ZSC Lions	1–3	EHC Biel	Hallenstadion, Zürich	Recap
No scoring		First period	Roe (Azevedo, Andrighetto) - 18:46
22:34 - Kessler (Haas, Fey); 28:15 - Rajala		Second period	No scoring
59:19 - Hofer (Rajala) (EN)		Third period	No scoring
Jakub Kovář ( 27 saves / 29 shots )		Goalie stats	Dmitry Shikin ( 38 saves / 39 shots )

2 April	EHC Biel	1–3	ZSC Lions	Tissot Arena, Biel/Bienne	Recap
No scoring		First period	Brunner (Cunti) - 00:39
No scoring		Second period	No scoring
53:08 - D. Hollenstein (Noreau); 54:46 - D. Hollenstein (Andrighetto); 59:55 - Schäppi (EN)		Third period	No scoring
Dmitry Shikin ( 24 saves / 26 shots )		Goalie stats	Jakub Kovář ( 35 saves / 36 shots )

4 April	ZSC Lions	3–1	EHC Biel	Hallenstadion, Zürich	Recap
No scoring		First period	No scoring
Andrighetto (D. Hollenstein) - 21:52		Second period	No scoring
Malgin (Pedretti) (SH1) - 47:27; Azevedo (Krüger, Kivistö) (EN) - 59:46		Third period	50:44 - Cunti (Künzle, Schneeberger)
Jakub Kovář ( 30 saves / 31 shots )		Goalie stats	Dmitry Shikin ( 24 saves / 26 shots )

ZSC Lions won the series 4–3

==== (4) SC Rapperswil-Jona Lakers vs. (5) HC Davos ====
25 March	SC Rapperswil-Jona Lakers	4–3	HC Davos	St. Galler Kantonalbank Arena, Rapperswil	Recap
No scoring		First period	09:50 - Corvi (Ambühl, Nygren)
Wetter (Sataric) - 22:33; Albrecht (Profico, Jelovac) - 30:38; Kossila (Djuse, Maier) - 36:36		Second period	No scoring
Wetter (Aebischer, Nyffeler) - 44:35		Third period	54:27 - Bromé (Ambühl, Stránský); 55:54 - Egli (Bromé, Prassl) (PP1)
Melvin Nyffeler ( 16 saves / 19 shots )		Goalie stats	Sandro Aeschlimann ( 28 saves / 32 shots )

27 March	HC Davos	1–4	SC Rapperswil-Jona Lakers	Eisstadion Davos, Davos	Recap
No scoring		First period	05:54 - Červenka
Ambühl (Nygren, Stránský) (PP1) - 29:52		Second period	No scoring
No scoring		Third period	44:45 - Forrer (Eggenberger, Wetter); 51:17 - Wetter (Wick); 53:46 - Červenka (Mitchell)
Sandro Aeschlimann ( 12 saves / 16 shots )		Goalie stats	Melvin Nyffeler ( 38 saves / 39 shots )

29 March	SC Rapperswil-Jona Lakers	4–0	HC Davos	St. Galler Kantonalbank Arena, Rapperswil	Recap
No scoring		First period	No scoring
Eggenberger (Lehmann, Maier) - 26:43; Wetter (Maier, Červenka) (PP1) - 37:36; Aebischer (Dünner, Mitchell) (PP1) - 39:59		Second period	No scoring
Eggenberger (Aebischer, Djuse) - 44:19		Third period	No scoring
Melvin Nyffeler ( 25 saves / 25 shots )		Goalie stats	Sandro Aeschlimann ( 22 saves / 26 shots )

31 March	HC Davos	2–0	SC Rapperswil-Jona Lakers	Eisstadion Davos, Davos	Recap
Stránský (Prassl, Corvi) - 11:17		First period	No scoring
No scoring		Second period	No scoring
Zgraggen (Ambühl) - 52:21		Third period	No scoring
Sandro Aeschlimann ( 35 saves / 35 shots )		Goalie stats	Melvin Nyffeler ( 19 saves / 21 shots )

2 April	SC Rapperswil-Jona Lakers	2–3	2OT	HC Davos	St. Galler Kantonalbank Arena, Rapperswil	Recap
No scoring		First period		No scoring
No scoring		Second period		29:47 - Dünner (Kossila) (PP1)
Stránský (PP1) - 57:57; Ambühl (Egli) - 58:36		Third period		48:08 - Lammer (Zangger, Profico) (PP1)
No scoring		Second overtime period		83:21 - Pospíšil (Egli)
Melvin Nyffeler ( 30 saves / 33 shots )		Goalie stats		Sandro Aeschlimann ( 52 saves / 54 shots )

4 April	HC Davos	7–3	SC Rapperswil-Jona Lakers	Eisstadion Davos, Davos	Recap
Bromé (PP1) - 02:00; Zgraggen (Nussbaumer) - 12:50; Pospíšil (Zgraggen, Bromé) (PP1) - 19:55		First period	06:18 - Wick; 16:35 - Albrecht (Červenka, Sataric)
Ambühl - 24:03		Second period	No scoring
Stránský (Wieser) (PP1) - 46:20; Rasmussen - 51:16; Ambühl - 57:06		Third period	59:57 - Profico (Červenka, Lammer) (PP1)
Sandro Aeschlimann ( 23 saves / 26 shots )		Goalie stats	Melvin Nyffeler ( 15 saves / 22 shots )

6 April	SC Rapperswil-Jona Lakers	1–3	HC Davos	St. Galler Kantonalbank Arena, Rapperswil	Recap
No scoring		First period	No scoring
No scoring		Second period	24:47 - Stránský (Bromé); 33:27 - Knak (Pospíšil, Nussbaumer)
Mitchell (Lammer) (PP1) - 57:31		Third period	52:21 - Knak (Pospíšil)
Melvin Nyffeler ( 17 saves / 20 shots )		Goalie stats	Sandro Aeschlimann ( 34 saves / 35 shots )

HC Davos won the series 4–3

=== Semi-finals ===
==== (1) EV Zug vs. (5) HC Davos ====
8 April	EV Zug	3–0	HC Davos	Bossard Arena, Zug	Recap
No scoring		First period	No scoring
Djoos (Jan Kovář) (PP2) - 24:29		Second period	No scoring
Jan Kovář (Hofmann) - 49:27; Senteler (Lander, Müller) (PP1) - 59:26		Third period	No scoring
Leonardo Genoni ( 21 saves / 21 shots )		Goalie stats	Sandro Aeschlimann ( 28 saves / 31 shots )

10 April	HC Davos	1–2	EV Zug	Eisstadion Davos, Davos	Recap
Corvi (Wieser) - 01:03		First period	No scoring
No scoring		Second period	25:22 - Djoos (Hofmann, Jan Kovář)
No scoring		Third period	59:45 - Müller (Hofmann) (PP1)
Sandro Aeschlimann ( 39 saves / 41 shots )		Goalie stats	Leonardo Genoni ( 21 saves / 22 shots )

12 April	EV Zug	3–0	HC Davos	Bossard Arena, Zug	Recap
Allenspach (Suri, Leuenberger) - 05:11		First period	No scoring
No scoring		Second period	No scoring
Zehnder (Herzog, Senteler) - 44:15; Simion (EN) - 59:59		Third period	No scoring
Leonardo Genoni ( 25 saves / 25 shots )		Goalie stats	Sandro Aeschlimann ( 33 saves / 35 shots )

14 April	HC Davos	1–2	OT	EV Zug	Eisstadion Davos, Davos	Recap
No scoring		First period		No scoring
Wellinger (Stránský, Bromé) - 37:55		Second period		No scoring
No scoring		Third period		59:41 - Hofmann (Djoos)
No scoring		First overtime period		60:45 - Jan Kovář (Hofmann)
Sandro Aeschlimann ( 36 saves / 38 shots )		Goalie stats		Leonardo Genoni ( 19 saves / 20 shots )

EV Zug won the series 4–0

==== (2) HC Fribourg-Gottéron vs. (3) ZSC Lions ====
8 April	HC Fribourg-Gottéron	2–3	2OT	ZSC Lions	BCF Arena, Fribourg	Recap
DiDomenico (Sprunger, Schmid) - 05:06		First period		04:38 - D. Hollenstein
No scoring		Second period		No scoring
Walser (Diaz) - 48:56		Third period		40:50 - Andrighetto (Malgin, D. Hollenstein)
No scoring		Second overtime period		81:18 - Malgin (Noreau)
Reto Berra ( 27 saves / 30 shots )		Goalie stats		Ludovic Waeber ( 36 saves / 38 shots )

10 April	ZSC Lions	3–2	OT	HC Fribourg-Gottéron	Hallenstadion, Zürich	Recap
Andrighetto (Malgin, Noreau) (PP1) - 14:45		First period		No scoring
Baltisberger (Pedretti) - 24:34		Second period		33:27 - Bykov (DiDomenico, Mottet); 37:17 - Mottet (Gunderson, DiDomenico) (PP1)
No scoring		Third period		No scoring
Krüger (Azevedo) - 64:31		First overtime period		No scoring
Ludovic Waeber ( 28 saves / 30 shots )		Goalie stats		Reto Berra ( 22 saves / 25 shots )

12 April	HC Fribourg-Gottéron	2–3	OT	ZSC Lions	BCF Arena, Fribourg	Recap
DiDomenico - 13:23		First period		06:33 - Azevedo (Bodenmann, Noreau)
No scoring		Second period		No scoring
Brodin (PP1) - 57:19		Third period		59:10 - Malgin (Noreau, Andrighetto)
No scoring		First overtime period		78:47 - Malgin
Reto Berra ( 35 saves / 38 shots )		Goalie stats		Ludovic Waeber ( 38 saves / 40 shots )

14 April	ZSC Lions	6–2	HC Fribourg-Gottéron	Hallenstadion, Zürich	Recap
M. Aeschlimann - 05:34		First period	06:06 - Desharnais
Noreau (Azevedo) - 23:39; Krüger (Weber) - 30:55; Bodenmann - 35:45; Bodenmann (Azevedo, Krüger) - 37:45		Second period	No scoring
M. Aeschlimann (Schäppi, Baltisberger) (EN) - 55:53		Third period	46:34 - Brodin (Gunderson)
Jakub Kovář ( 21 saves / 23 shots )		Goalie stats	Reto Berra ( 21 saves / 26 shots )

ZSC Lions won the series 4–0

=== Finals ===
18 April	EV Zug	2–3	ZSC Lions	Bossard Arena, Zug	Recap
No scoring		First period	No scoring
Hofmann (Simion) - 33:55; Herzog (Zehnder) - 36:44		Second period	No scoring
No scoring		Third period	47:47 - Noreau (Andrighetto) (PP1); 58:31 - Baltisberger (Marti); 59:58 - Azevedo (PP1)
Luca Hollenstein ( 31 saves / 34 shots )		Goalie stats	Jakub Kovář ( 24 saves / 26 shots )

20 April	ZSC Lions	2–1	EV Zug	Hallenstadion, Zürich	Recap
No scoring		First period	No scoring
Andrighetto (Noreau, Malgin) (PP1) - 29:42		Second period	22:02 - Zehnder (Senteler, Djoos)
Malgin (D. Hollenstein, Marti) - 56:57		Third period	No scoring
Jakub Kovář ( 34 saves / 35 shots )		Goalie stats	Leonardo Genoni ( 27 saves / 29 shots )

23 April	EV Zug	1–2	ZSC Lions	Bossard Arena, Zug	Recap
Hofmann (Hansson, Jan Kovář) (PP2) - 12:06		First period	No scoring
No scoring		Second period	No scoring
No scoring		Third period	49:56 - Noreau (Malgin); 51:28 - Malgin (D. Hollenstein)
Leonardo Genoni ( 23 saves / 25 shots )		Goalie stats	Jakub Kovář ( 27 saves / 28 shots )

25 April	ZSC Lions	1–4	EV Zug	Hallenstadion, Zürich	Recap
Malgin (Pedretti) - 04:45		First period	12:40 - Zehnder (Suri)
No scoring		Second period	24:07 - Djoos
No scoring		Third period	51:48 - Simion (Jan Kovář, Herzog); 58:26 - Hansson (EN)
Jakub Kovář ( 34 saves / 37 shots )		Goalie stats	Leonardo Genoni ( 20 saves / 21 shots )

27 April	EV Zug	4–1	ZSC Lions	Bossard Arena, Zug	Recap
No scoring		First period	No scoring
Simion (Jan Kovář, Herzog) - 37:59		Second period	30:51 - Malgin
Simion (Jan Kovář) (SH1) - 51:16; Simion (Jan Kovář) (EN) - 57:46; Jan Kovář (EN) - 58:49		Third period	No scoring
Leonardo Genoni ( 26 saves / 27 shots )		Goalie stats	Jakub Kovář ( 29 saves / 31 shots )

29 April	ZSC Lions	0–2	EV Zug	Hallenstadion, Zürich	Recap
No scoring		First period	03:15 - Herzog
No scoring		Second period	No scoring
No scoring		Third period	52:37 - Hofmann (Jan Kovář) (PP1)
Jakub Kovář ( 19 saves / 21 shots )		Goalie stats	Leonardo Genoni ( 36 saves / 36 shots )

1 May	EV Zug	3–1	ZSC Lions	Bossard Arena, Zug	Recap
Simion (Jan Kovář) – 17:34		First period	01:02 – Azevedo (Roe) (PP1)
Herzog (Simion) (PP1) – 33:41		Second period	No scoring
Simion (EN) – 59:10		Third period	No scoring
Leonardo Genoni ( 27 saves / 28 shots )		Goalie stats	Jakub Kovář ( 21 saves / 23 shots )

EV Zug won the series 4–3
