= Fabrice Herzog =

Swiss ice hockey player (born 1994)

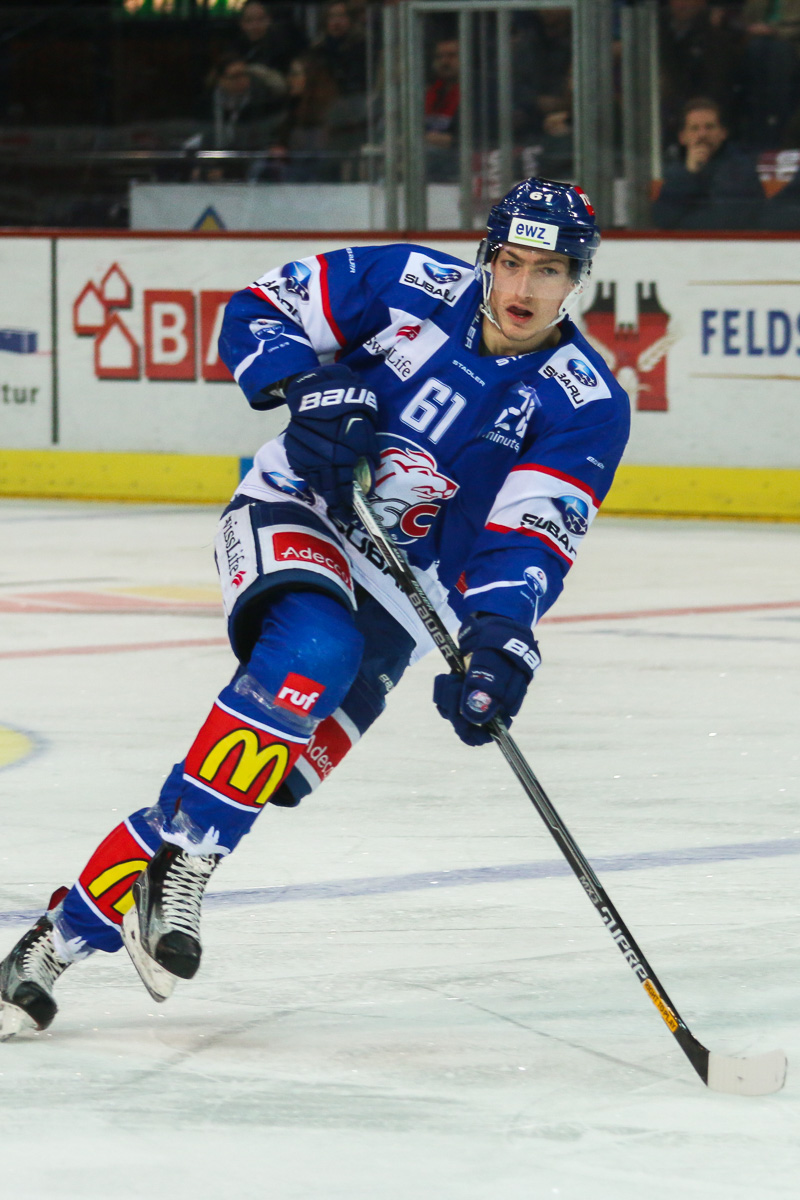
- Born: 9 December 1994 (age 31) Frauenfeld, Switzerland
- Height: 6 ft 2 in (188 cm)
- Weight: 192 lb (87 kg; 13 st 10 lb)
- Position: Forward
- Shoots: Left
- NL team Former teams: SC Rapperswil-Jona Lakers; Toronto Marlies; ZSC Lions; HC Davos; EV Zug
- National team: Switzerland
- NHL draft: 142nd overall, 2013; Toronto Maple Leafs
- Playing career: 2012–present

Fabrice Herzog (born 9 December 1994) is a Swiss professional ice hockey forward currently playing for SC Rapperswil-Jona Lakers in the National League (NL). He was drafted 142nd overall by the Toronto Maple Leafs in the 2013 NHL entry draft.

== Playing career ==
As a youth, Herzog played local team Pikes EHC Oberthurgau before joining the junior program of EV Zug. In his second season of Elite Junior A, Herzog made his professional debut with EV Zug in the 2012–13 season, appearing in 20 games for 4 points.

After his selection to the Maple Leafs in the off-season, Herzog opted to play major junior hockey in North America in the Quebec Major Junior Hockey League after he was selected 42nd overall in the 2013 CHL Import Draft by the Québec Remparts. Herzog adapted quickly with the Remparts and was amongst the team's top scorers with 58 points in 61 games. Following an opening-round post-season defeat, Herzog continued his 2013–14 season by agreeing to an amateur try-out contract with the Maple Leafs American Hockey League affiliate, the Toronto Marlies, on 3 April 2014. Herzog featured in five scoreless games with the Marlies.

On 6 June 2014, without a contract offer from the Maple Leafs, Herzog opted to continue his development in his homeland, returning to EV Zug on a one-year deal. During the 2014–15 season, Herzog agreed to a two-year contract with top NLA club, ZSC Lions to commence the following year.

Following a breakout season in which he posted a career-high 22 points in his debut campaign with the Lions in 2015–16, Herzog agreed to a two-year contract extension on 29 April 2016.

On 16 November 2018, Herzog signed a two-year contract with HC Davos for the 2019–20 season and through the 2020–21 season.

On February 1, 2021, Herzog agreed to a two-year deal to return to EV Zug for the 2021/22 and 2022/23 season.

On 18 February 2021, Herzog was suspended for eight games following a hit to the head of SCB's Eric Blum on 14 February 2021. He also received a CHF 11,150 fine.

On 4 November 2021, he was suspended for another five games following a cross-check against HC Fribourg-Gottéron's Mauro Dufner on 31 October 2021 and fined CHF 7,700.

== International play ==
Medal record

Representing Switzerland

Ice hockey

World Championships
Silver medal – second place	2024 Czechia	

Herzog first played in the Swiss national program at the 2012 IIHF World U18 Championships. He later made his full international debut after he was selected to the Swiss national team to participate at the 2017 IIHF World Championship in Germany/France. Herzog impressively scored the game-tying and overtime winning goal for Switzerland in a round-robin comeback win over Canada on 13 May 2017.

He represented Switzerland at the 2024 IIHF World Championship and won a silver medal.

== Career statistics ==
=== Regular season and playoffs ===
			Regular season					Playoffs
Season	Team	League	GP	G	A	Pts	PIM	GP	G	A	Pts	PIM
2009–10	Pikes Oberthurgau	SUI U17	32	6	7	13	12	—	—	—	—	—
2010–11	Pikes Oberthurgau	SUI U17	27	22	14	36	14	—	—	—	—	—
2010–11	Pikes Oberthurgau	SUI.3	2	0	0	0	0	—	—	—	—	—
2010–11	Pikes Oberthurgau	SUI.5	1	0	1	1	2	—	—	—	—	—
2011–12	EV Zug	SUI U20	35	18	14	32	45	10	6	2	8	6
2012–13	EV Zug	SUI U20	32	28	17	45	26	4	3	2	5	2
2012–13	EV Zug	NLA	20	2	2	4	6	—	—	—	—	—
2013–14	Québec Remparts	QMJHL	61	32	26	58	34	5	3	2	5	4
2013–14	Toronto Marlies	AHL	5	0	0	0	0	—	—	—	—	—
2014–15	EV Zug	NLA	43	6	3	9	16	6	0	3	3	0
2015–16	ZSC Lions	NLA	34	9	13	22	57	4	2	0	2	0
2016–17	ZSC Lions	NLA	44	9	11	20	14	6	2	1	3	4
2017–18	ZSC Lions	NL	46	7	8	15	57	18	6	2	8	6
2018–19	ZSC Lions	NL	41	6	6	12	33	—	—	—	—	—
2019–20	HC Davos	NL	50	14	17	31	36	—	—	—	—	—
2020–21	HC Davos	NL	33	18	12	30	59	3	0	1	1	0
2021–22	EV Zug	NL	38	15	11	26	18	15	7	7	14	4
2022–23	EV Zug	NL	52	15	16	31	12	11	3	4	7	0
2023–24	EV Zug	NL	52	18	16	34	14	11	4	5	9	4
2024–25	EV Zug	NL	43	13	6	19	6	—	—	—	—	—
NL totals			496	132	121	253	328	66	25	26	51	18
AHL totals			5	0	0	0	0	—	—	—	—	—

=== International ===
Year	Team	Event	Result	GP	G	A	Pts	PIM
2012	Switzerland	U18	7th	6	2	0	2	0
2014	Switzerland	WJC	7th	5	3	0	3	0
2017	Switzerland	WC	6th	8	3	0	3	0
2018	Switzerland	OG	10th	3	0	1	1	0
2021	Switzerland	WC	6th	6	1	2	3	2
2022	Switzerland	OG	8th	5	1	1	2	2
2022	Switzerland	WC	5th	8	3	3	6	2
2023	Switzerland	WC	5th	8	1	2	3	2
2024	Switzerland	WC	2nd place, silver medalist(s)	10	0	1	1	2
Junior totals				11	5	0	5	0
Senior totals				48	9	10	19	10
