= Simon Bodenmann =

Swiss ice hockey player (born 1988)

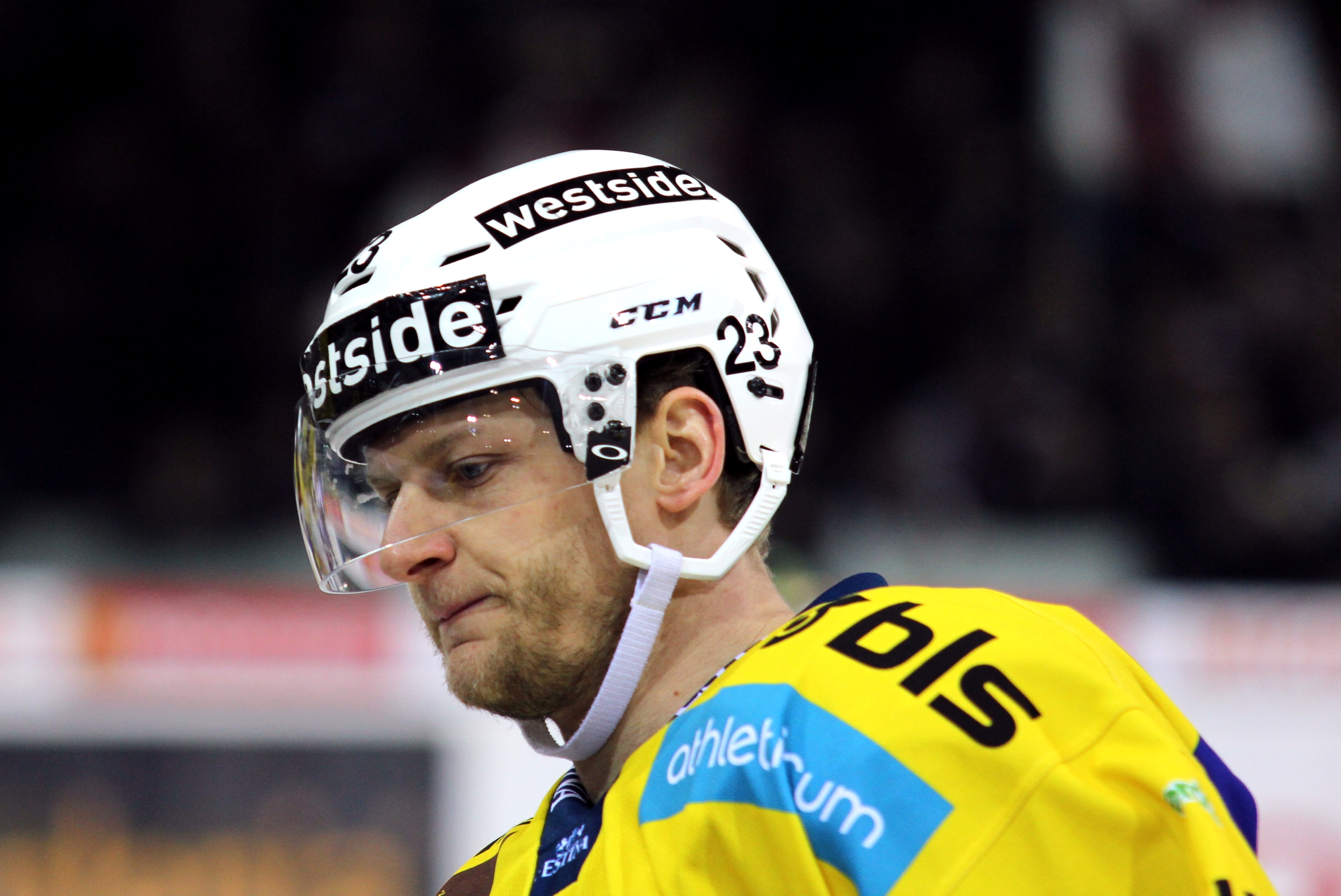
- Bodenmann in 2016 with the SC Bern
- Born: 2 March 1988 (age 37) Urnäsch, Switzerland
- Height: 5 ft 10 in (178 cm)
- Weight: 183 lb (83 kg; 13 st 1 lb)
- Position: Left wing
- Shoots: Left
- NL team Former teams: ZSC Lions; Kloten Flyers; SC Bern
- National team: Switzerland
- Playing career: 2006–present

Simon Bodenmann (born 2 March 1988) is a Swiss professional ice hockey forward who is currently playing for the ZSC Lions of the National League (NL).

== Playing career ==
Bodenmann joined Bern after spending the first 9 professional seasons of his career with fellow Swiss club, the Kloten Flyers. He signed a three-year contract to commence from the 2015–16 season on August 28, 2014.

On November 2, 2017, Bodenmann was signed to a four-year contract worth CHF 3.2 million by the ZSC Lions. The contract will begin from the 2018–19 season.

== International play ==
Bodenmann competed in the 2013 IIHF World Championship, 2015 IIHF World Championship and the 2014 Winter Olympics as a member of the Switzerland men's national ice hockey team.

== Career statistics ==
=== Regular season and playoffs ===
			Regular season					Playoffs
Season	Team	League	GP	G	A	Pts	PIM	GP	G	A	Pts	PIM
2003–04	Kloten Flyers	SUI U20	8	0	0	0	2	—	—	—	—	—
2004–05	Kloten Flyers	SUI U20	39	6	8	14	57	5	0	0	0	4
2005–06	Kloten Flyers	SUI U20	35	22	6	28	20	—	—	—	—	—
2005–06	EHC Bülach	SUI.3	2	0	0	0	2	—	—	—	—	—
2006–07	Kloten Flyers	SUI U20	16	12	9	21	18	1	0	1	1	0
2006–07	Kloten Flyers	NLA	1	0	0	0	0	—	—	—	—	—
2006–07	EHC Winterthur	SUI.3	19	14	9	23	28	10	6	2	8	18
2007–08	Kloten Flyers	SUI U20	3	4	1	5	2	1	0	0	0	0
2007–08	Kloten Flyers	NLA	18	0	0	0	4	—	—	—	—	—
2007–08	EHC Winterthur	SUI.3	6	2	2	4	20	2	1	0	1	0
2007–08	Switzerland U20	SUI.2	6	6	1	7	4	—	—	—	—	—
2008–09	Kloten Flyers	NLA	12	0	1	1	0	9	0	2	2	0
2008–09	HC Thurgau	SUI.2	39	8	12	20	28	6	3	0	3	10
2009–10	Kloten Flyers	NLA	45	4	6	10	10	10	1	2	3	0
2010–11	Kloten Flyers	NLA	41	17	9	26	28	18	2	3	5	12
2011–12	Kloten Flyers	NLA	48	6	13	19	20	5	0	0	0	2
2012–13	Kloten Flyers	NLA	49	15	13	28	30	—	—	—	—	—
2013–14	Kloten Flyers	NLA	38	11	18	29	32	13	2	4	6	10
2014–15	Kloten Flyers	NLA	49	9	7	16	36	—	—	—	—	—
2015–16	SC Bern	NLA	44	8	14	22	8	13	2	5	7	2
2016–17	SC Bern	NLA	33	8	13	21	26	15	2	4	6	10
2017–18	SC Bern	NL	50	17	18	35	24	11	7	4	11	4
2018–19	ZSC Lions	NL	48	14	17	31	40	—	—	—	—	—
2019–20	ZSC Lions	NL	50	16	13	29	42	—	—	—	—	—
2020–21	ZSC Lions	NL	40	8	13	21	45	9	1	2	3	10
2021–22	ZSC Lions	NL	20	5	5	10	8	18	3	1	4	8
NL totals			586	138	160	298	353	121	20	27	47	58

Medal record

Representing Switzerland

Ice hockey

World Championships
Silver medal – second place	2013 Sweden/Finland	

=== International ===
Year	Team	Event	Result	GP	G	A	Pts	PIM
2006	Switzerland	WJC18 D1	12th	5	3	0	3	8
2013	Switzerland	WC	2nd place, silver medalist(s)	10	2	3	5	2
2014	Switzerland	OG	9th	3	1	0	1	0
2015	Switzerland	WC	8th	8	1	0	1	2
2017	Switzerland	WC	6th	8	1	0	1	2
2018	Switzerland	OG	10th	2	0	0	0	2
Junior totals				5	3	0	3	8
Senior totals				31	5	3	8	8
