= Denis Hollenstein =

Swiss ice hockey player (born 1989)

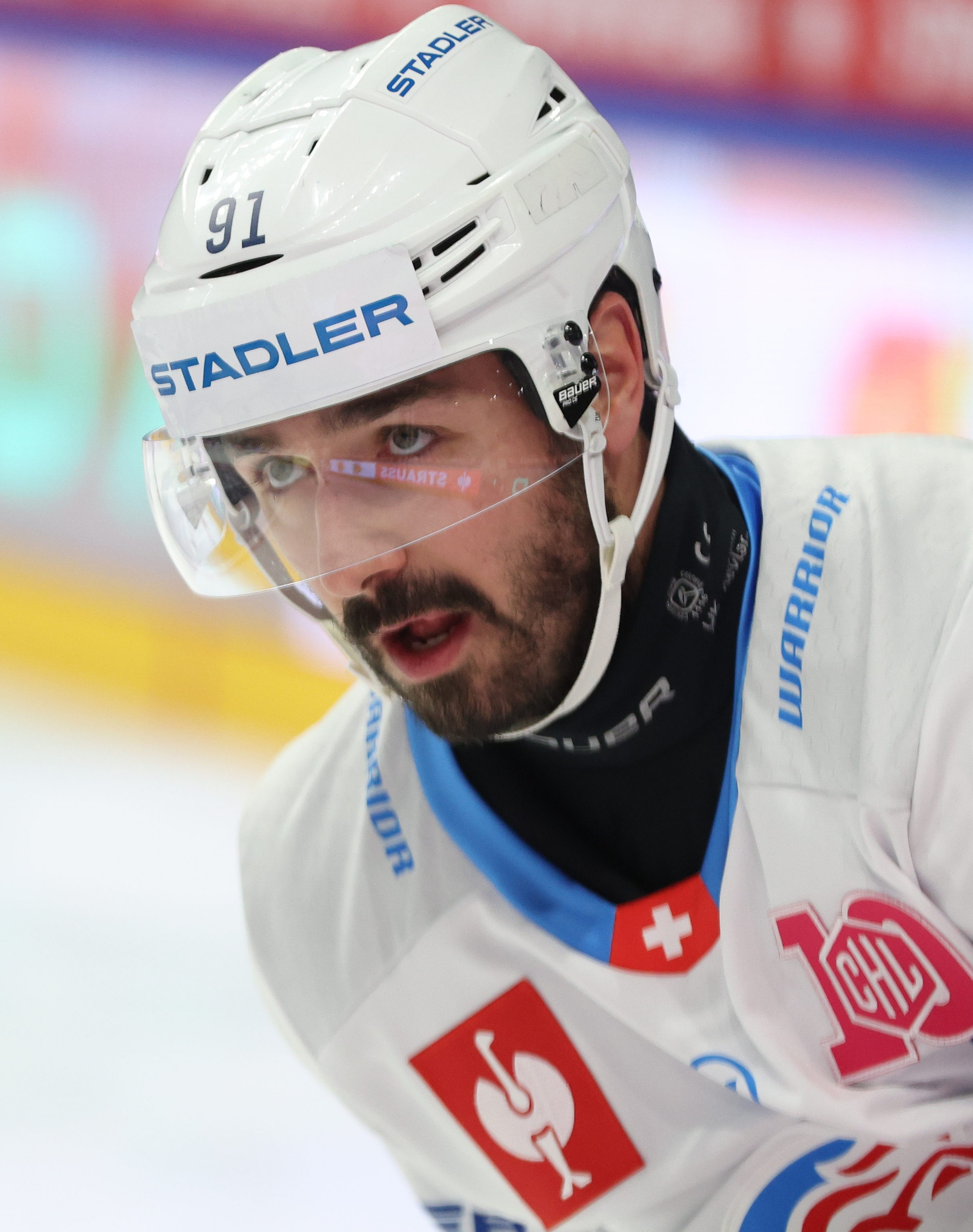
- Hollenstein in 2024
- Born: 15 October 1989 (age 36) Zürich, Switzerland
- Height: 182 cm (6 ft 0 in)
- Weight: 90 kg (198 lb; 14 st 2 lb)
- Position: Left wing
- Shoots: Left
- NL team Former teams: ZSC Lions; EHC Kloten; Genève-Servette HC
- National team: Switzerland
- NHL draft: Undrafted
- Playing career: 2006–present

Denis Hollenstein (born 15 October 1989) is a Swiss professional ice hockey winger who currently plays for the ZSC Lions in the National League (NL).

== Playing career ==
On 8 December 2015, Hollenstein signed a three-year contract extension worth SFr 2.1 million to continue playing for Kloten.

On 21 November 2017, it was announced that despite having a contract valid through the 2019–20 season with Kloten, Hollenstein would join the ZSC Lions for the 2018–19 season. The Lions paid Kloten a SFr 2 million fee to acquire Hollenstein. Meanwhile, rumors circulated that Hollenstein's contract with the ZSC had been increased to SFr 1 million per season. It was officially confirmed on 27 November 2017 that Hollenstein had agreed to a five-year contract worth SFr 5 million with the Lions. Hollenstein is set to make his debut with Kloten's biggest rival in September 2018.

== International play ==
Hollenstein competed in the 2012 IIHF World Championship as a member of the Switzerland men's national ice hockey team.

== Career statistics ==
=== Regular season and playoffs ===
			Regular season					Playoffs
Season	Team	League	GP	G	A	Pts	PIM	GP	G	A	Pts	PIM
2005–06	Kloten Flyers	SUI U20	46	9	11	20	38	—	—	—	—	—
2006–07	Kloten Flyers	SUI U20	29	14	21	35	60	4	3	2	5	12
2006–07	EHC Bülach	SUI.3	3	2	1	3	27	2	2	1	3	14
2007–08	Guelph Storm	OHL	37	5	4	9	32	7	2	0	2	4
2008–09	Guelph Storm	OHL	56	12	12	24	25	4	1	3	4	6
2009–10	Kloten Flyers	NLA	28	6	8	14	20	10	1	1	2	6
2009–10	HC Thurgau	SUI.2	1	0	1	1	0	—	—	—	—	—
2010–11	Kloten Flyers	NLA	45	13	16	29	94	3	0	0	0	2
2011–12	Kloten Flyers	NLA	15	0	10	10	34	5	0	4	4	14
2012–13	Kloten Flyers	NLA	48	12	25	37	89	—	—	—	—	—
2013–14	Genève–Servette HC	NLA	41	10	27	37	53	12	1	3	4	18
2014–15	Kloten Flyers	NLA	35	8	21	29	28	—	—	—	—	—
2015–16	Kloten Flyers	NLA	43	14	23	37	38	4	0	2	2	4
2016–17	EHC Kloten	NLA	50	23	21	44	99	—	—	—	—	—
2017–18	EHC Kloten	NL	49	15	24	39	56	—	—	—	—	—
2018–19	ZSC Lions	NL	49	12	21	33	46	—	—	—	—	—
2019–20	ZSC Lions	NL	45	14	20	34	42	—	—	—	—	—
2020–21	ZSC Lions	NL	50	21	23	44	32	8	2	2	4	4
2021–22	ZSC Lions	NL	43	13	20	33	49	15	4	6	10	10
NL totals			541	161	259	420	680	57	8	18	26	58

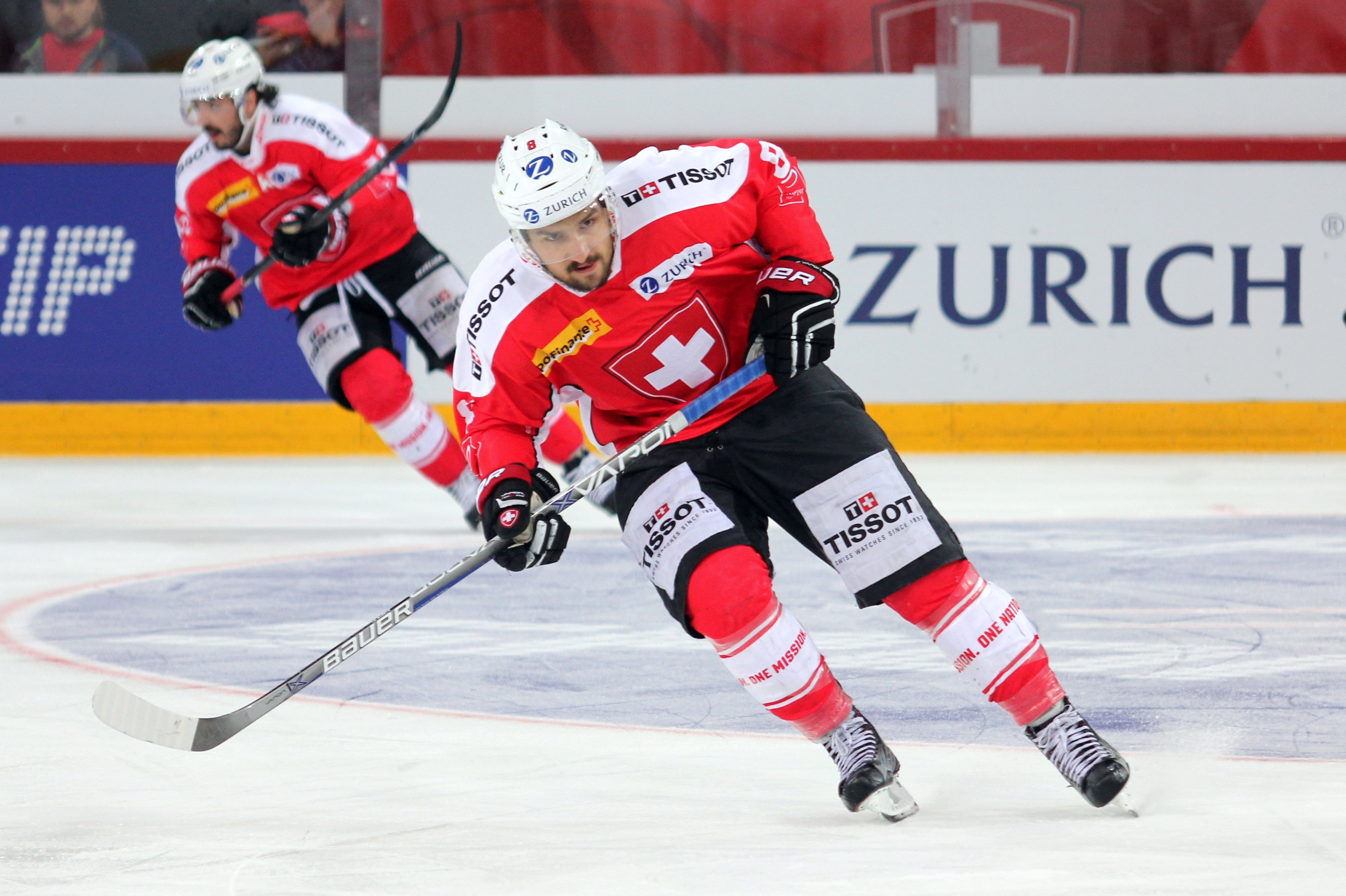

Medal record

Representing Switzerland

Ice hockey

World Championships
Silver medal – second place	2013 Sweden/Finland	

=== International ===
Year	Team	Event	Result	GP	G	A	Pts	PIM
2007	Switzerland	WJC18	6th	6	2	2	4	8
2008	Switzerland	WJC	9th	6	0	0	0	0
2012	Switzerland	WC	11th	7	0	2	2	2
2013	Switzerland	WC	2nd place, silver medalist(s)	10	4	4	8	2
2014	Switzerland	OG	9th	3	0	1	1	2
2014	Switzerland	WC	10th	7	3	2	5	2
2015	Switzerland	WC	8th	8	2	0	2	6
2016	Switzerland	WC	11th	7	3	1	4	4
2017	Switzerland	WC	6th	7	0	5	5	2
2018	Switzerland	OG	10th	4	1	0	1	0
2022	Switzerland	OG	8th	5	0	1	1	2
Junior totals				12	2	2	4	8
Senior totals				58	13	16	29	22
