= Niklas Schlegel =

Swiss ice hockey player

- Born: August 3, 1994 (age 31) Zürich, Switzerland
- Height: 5 ft 10 in (178 cm)
- Weight: 146 lb (66 kg; 10 st 6 lb)
- Position: Goaltender
- Catches: Left
- NL team Former teams: HC Lugano; ZSC Lions; SC Bern
- National team: Switzerland
- Playing career: 2011–present

Niklas Schlegel (born August 3, 1994) is a Swiss professional ice hockey goaltender currently playing for HC Lugano in the National League (NL).

== Playing career ==
Schlegel made his National League (NL) debut with the ZSC Lions during the 2014–15 season.

After 8 seasons in the Lions organization, Schlegel joined SC Bern for the 2019–20 season on a two-year deal through the 2020–21 season. However, he was shipped to HC Lugano during the 2019 December international break.

== International play ==
He was named to the Swiss national team for the 2017 IIHF World Championship.
