= Schäppi =

Schäppi is a surname. Notable people with the surname include:

- Johann Jakob Schäppi (1819–1908), Swiss politician
- Reto Schäppi (born 1991), Swiss professional ice hockey center
