= Reto Schäppi =

Swiss professional ice hockey center (born 1991)

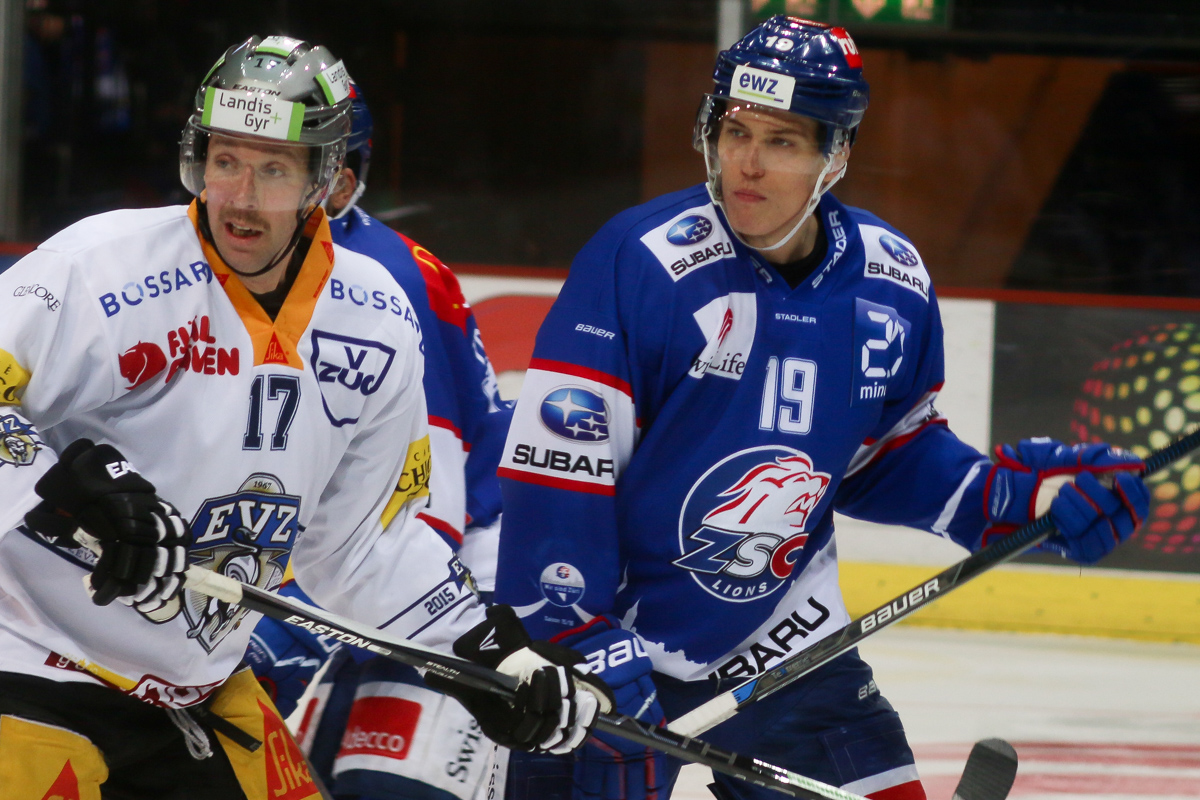
- Born: January 27, 1991 (age 34) Horgen, Switzerland
- Height: 6 ft 5 in (196 cm)
- Weight: 210 lb (95 kg; 15 st 0 lb)
- Position: Centre
- Shoots: Left
- NL team: ZSC Lions
- National team: Switzerland
- Playing career: 2008–present

Reto Schäppi (born January 27, 1991) is a Swiss professional ice hockey center who currently plays for and is an alternate captain of the ZSC Lions of the National League (NL).

== Playing career ==
He was named to the Switzerland men's national ice hockey team for competition at the 2014 IIHF World Championship and the following 2015 IIHF World Championship.

On January 13, 2014, Schäppi signed a two-year contract extension to remain with the ZSC Lions.

On April 29, 2016, Schäppi was signed to a two-year contract extension by the Lions.

On November 21, 2018, Schäppi signed an early two-year contract extension with the Lions.

On February 17, 2021, Schäppi agreed to an early one-year contract extension with the Lions through to the end of the 2021/22 season.

== Career statistics ==
=== Regular season and playoffs ===
			Regular season					Playoffs
Season	Team	League	GP	G	A	Pts	PIM	GP	G	A	Pts	PIM
2006–07	ZSC Lions	SUI U17	21	17	11	28	26	4	0	3	3	33
2006–07	ZSC Lions	SUI.2 U20	20	6	4	10	18	—	—	—	—	—
2006–07	GCK Lions	SUI U20	1	0	0	0	2	—	—	—	—	—
2007–08	ZSC Lions	SUI U17	7	3	2	5	4	11	9	10	19	8
2007–08	GCK Lions	SUI U20	35	5	4	9	18	7	3	2	5	10
2007–08	Switzerland U20	SUI.2	1	0	1	1	0	—	—	—	—	—
2008–09	GCK Lions	SUI U20	12	3	8	11	8	6	1	3	4	4
2008–09	GCK Lions	SUI.2	33	2	8	10	12	—	—	—	—	—
2009–10	GCK Lions	SUI.2	33	6	2	8	24	—	—	—	—	—
2009–10	GCK Lions	SUI U20	—	—	—	—	—	7	3	5	8	2
2010–11	GCK Lions	SUI.2	12	1	7	8	6	—	—	—	—	—
2010–11	ZSC Lions	NLA	31	2	3	5	2	5	0	1	1	8
2010–11	GCK Lions	SUI U20	—	—	—	—	—	3	0	3	3	2
2011–12	ZSC Lions	NLA	45	5	6	11	10	15	4	1	5	6
2012–13	ZSC Lions	NLA	50	5	3	8	12	12	2	2	4	4
2013–14	ZSC Lions	NLA	49	10	13	23	16	18	0	3	3	8
2014–15	ZSC Lions	NLA	50	9	12	21	20	18	1	4	5	10
2015–16	ZSC Lions	NLA	50	4	9	13	28	4	0	0	0	0
2016–17	ZSC Lions	NLA	45	3	7	10	18	6	1	0	1	6
2017–18	ZSC Lions	NL	50	8	6	14	30	18	3	3	6	36
2018–19	ZSC Lions	NL	48	3	5	8	26	—	—	—	—	—
2019–20	ZSC Lions	NL	50	3	6	9	20	—	—	—	—	—
2020–21	ZSC Lions	NL	48	2	4	6	44	9	0	0	0	0
2021–22	ZSC Lions	NL	50	4	7	11	30	18	1	1	2	14
NL totals			566	58	81	139	256	123	12	15	27	92

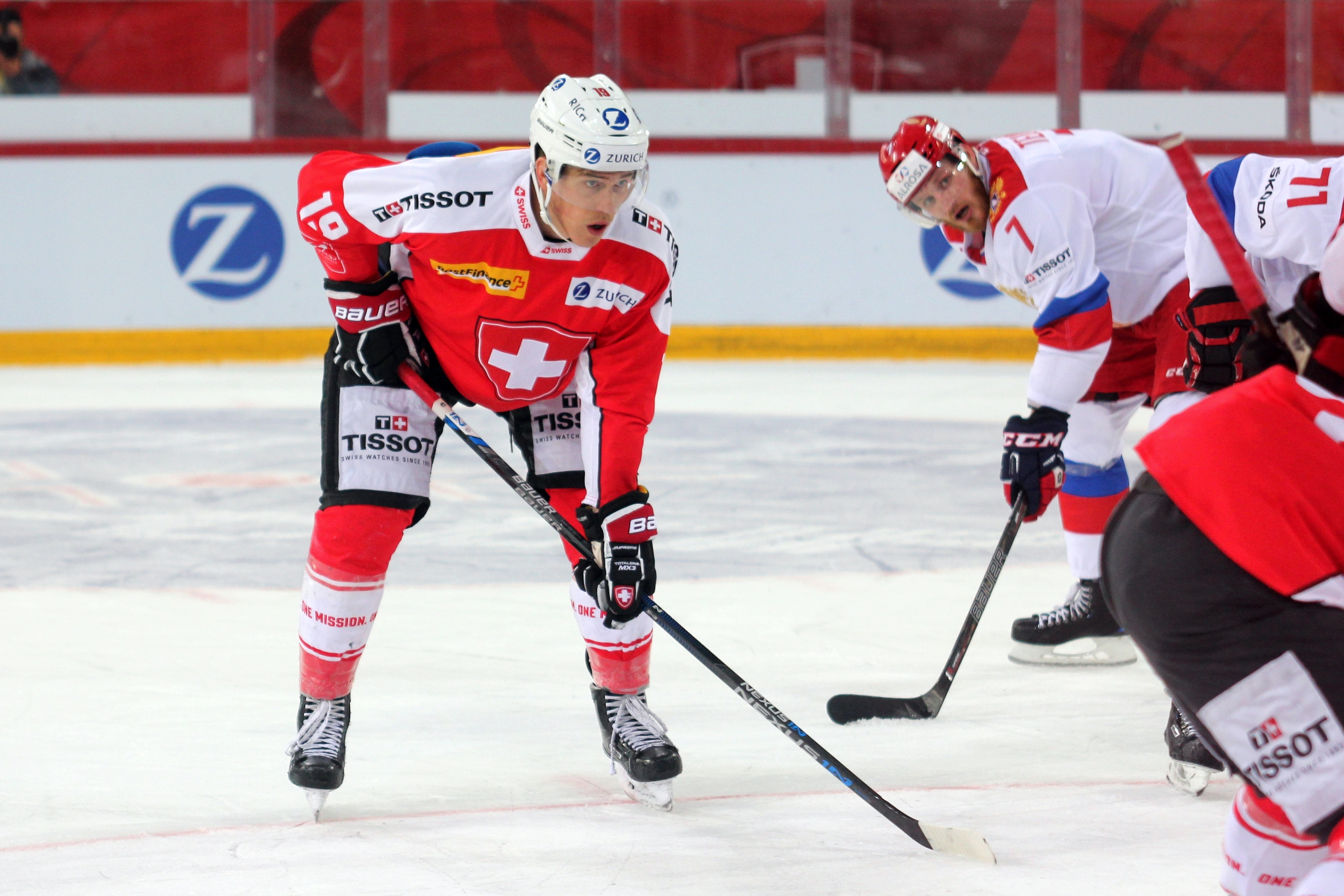

Medal record

Ice hockey

Representing Switzerland

World Championships
Silver medal – second place	2018 Denmark	

=== International ===
Year	Team	Event	Result	GP	G	A	Pts	PIM
2008	Switzerland	WJC18	8th	6	0	1	1	4
2009	Switzerland	WJC18	8th	6	3	3	6	2
2010	Switzerland	WJC	4th	7	0	2	2	4
2011	Switzerland	WJC	5th	5	0	0	0	8
2014	Switzerland	WC	10th	7	1	0	1	6
2015	Switzerland	WC	8th	8	0	1	1	4
2016	Switzerland	WC	11th	5	0	2	2	2
2017	Switzerland	WC	6th	8	2	1	3	8
2018	Switzerland	OG	10th	4	1	0	1	0
2018	Switzerland	WC	2nd place, silver medalist(s)	10	0	0	0	4
Junior totals				24	3	6	9	18
Senior totals				42	4	4	8	24
