= Killian Mottet =

Swiss ice hockey player

- Born: 15 January 1991 (age 34); Evionnaz, Switzerland
- Height: 5 ft 10 in (178 cm)
- Weight: 168 lb (76 kg; 12 st 0 lb)
- Position: Left wing
- Shoots: Left
- NL team: HC Fribourg-Gottéron
- National team: Switzerland
- Playing career: 2009–present

Killian Mottet (born 15 January 1991) is a Swiss professional ice hockey player currently playing for HC Fribourg-Gottéron of the National League (NL). He was named to the 2022 Swiss Olympic men's ice hockey team.

== Career statistics ==
=== Regular season and playoffs ===
			Regular season					Playoffs
Season	Team	League	GP	G	A	Pts	PIM	GP	G	A	Pts	PIM
2006–07	HC Fribourg–Gottéron	SUI U17	31	34	18	52	62	—	—	—	—	—
2006–07	HC Fribourg–Gottéron	SUI U20	7	0	0	0	0	—	—	—	—	—
2007–08	HC Fribourg–Gottéron	SUI U17	21	23	17	40	50	—	—	—	—	—
2007–08	HC Fribourg–Gottéron	SUI U20	25	9	8	17	14	—	—	—	—	—
2008–09	HC Fribourg–Gottéron	SUI U20	34	32	35	67	56	13	5	6	11	22
2009–10	HC Fribourg–Gottéron	SUI U20	31	24	35	59	98	—	—	—	—	—
2009–10	HC Fribourg–Gottéron	NLA	18	0	0	0	6	—	—	—	—	—
2009–10	HC Sierre–Anniviers	SUI.2	9	1	1	2	2	6	0	0	0	0
2010–11	HC Fribourg–Gottéron	SUI U20	7	7	8	15	10	—	—	—	—	—
2010–11	HC Sierre–Anniviers	SUI.2	45	14	15	29	42	3	4	0	4	2
2011–12	Lausanne HC	SUI.2	43	7	8	15	20	4	0	0	0	0
2012–13	HC Ajoie	SUI.2	50	28	32	60	50	12	2	5	7	18
2012–13	HC Fribourg–Gottéron	NLA	—	—	—	—	—	2	0	0	0	0
2013–14	HC Fribourg–Gottéron	NLA	49	10	14	24	20	9	1	0	1	8
2013–14	HC Ajoie	SUI.2	7	2	6	8	2	—	—	—	—	—
2014–15	HC Fribourg–Gottéron	NLA	50	12	10	22	45	—	—	—	—	—
2015–16	HC Fribourg–Gottéron	NLA	50	12	18	30	62	4	1	0	1	14
2016–17	HC Fribourg–Gottéron	NLA	50	9	15	24	34	—	—	—	—	—
2017–18	HC Fribourg–Gottéron	NL	49	13	15	28	18	5	1	0	1	8
2018–19	HC Fribourg–Gottéron	NL	50	11	20	31	28	—	—	—	—	—
2019–20	HC Fribourg–Gottéron	NL	41	15	15	30	8	—	—	—	—	—
2020–21	HC Fribourg–Gottéron	NL	50	23	25	48	34	5	2	0	2	2
2021–22	HC Fribourg–Gottéron	NL	49	18	25	43	24	9	5	5	10	12
2022–23	HC Fribourg–Gottéron	NL	52	15	17	32	37	2	0	1	1	0
NL totals			508	138	174	312	316	36	10	6	16	44

=== International ===
Year	Team	Event	GP	G	A	Pts	PIM
2021	Switzerland	WC	2	0	0	0	0
2022	Switzerland	OG	5	1	0	1	0
Senior totals			7	1	0	1	0
