= Ryan Gunderson =

American ice hockey player (born 1985)

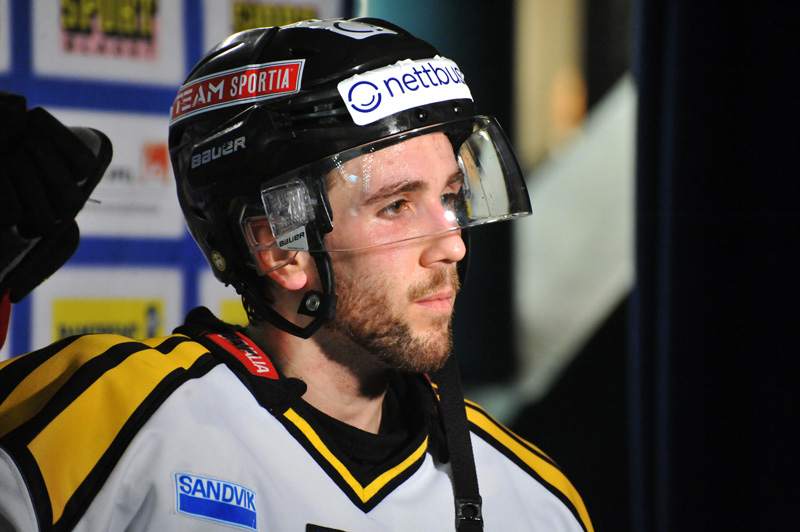
- Born: August 16, 1985 (age 39); Bensalem, Pennsylvania, U.S.
- Height: 5 ft 10 in (178 cm)
- Weight: 174 lb (79 kg; 12 st 6 lb)
- Position: Defense
- Shoots: Left
- NL team Former teams: HC Fribourg-Gottéron; Lowell Devils; Houston Aeros; Brynäs IF; Jokerit; HC Dinamo Minsk
- National team: United States
- NHL draft: Undrafted
- Playing career: 2007–present

Ryan Gunderson (born August 16, 1985) is an American professional ice hockey defenseman currently playing for HC Fribourg-Gottéron of the National League (NL).

== Playing career ==
=== Amateur ===
Gunderson attended Holy Ghost Preparatory School in Bensalem, Pennsylvania. Gunderson graduated in the year 2003. While at Holy Ghost, Gunderson was a standout hockey player. He still holds the team record for most points in a single regular season with 94 (26 goals and 68 assists). In his senior year, Gunderson led Ghost to a Flyers Cup Championship and a 2nd-place finish in the State Championship. After graduating from Holy Ghost, Ryan Gunderson attended the University of Vermont where he played hockey all 4 years. He currently holds the team record for most games played in a career with 148. He was inducted into the Holy Ghost Prep Athletic Hall of Fame in 2024.

=== Professional ===
After leaving Vermont at the conclusion of his senior year, Gunderson signed a deal to play with the Columbia Inferno of the ECHL in March 2007. He appeared in 12 games and tallied 3 assists for the Inferno.

In late 2007, Gunderson signed a deal to play for the Trenton Devils, the ECHL affiliate of the New Jersey Devils. Gunderson immediately excelled for the Devils, tallying 22 points (2 goals, 20 assists) in the first 29 games of his rookie season. He was selected as the lone representative from the Devils to play in the ECHL All-Star Game as a defenseman. Gunderson finished his rookie season with 46 points (4 goals, 42 assists) to lead all rookie defensemen and to place 4th in scoring among all rookies. His 42 assists also ranked him second among all ECHL defensemen. For his accomplishments, Gunderson was selected to the ECHL All Rookie Team for the 2008 season. In the 2008–09 season, Gunderson set a team record for most assists in a season with 53, and most points by a defenseman with 58. He was selected to the All-ECHL First team after being tied for the league lead for most points by a defenseman.

On April 9, 2008, it was announced that Gunderson had signed a professional tryout agreement with the AHL affiliate of the Trenton Devils, the Lowell Devils. He appeared in 3 games and tallied 0 points.

After three minor league North American seasons, Gunderson opted to travel abroad and signed with Swedish club Örebro HK of the HockeyAllsvenskan during the 2010–11 season.

Örebro initially extended Ryan's contract on October 18, 2010, for the following season 2012 season, however Gunderson gained the attention and came to terms with top tier Swedish club Brynäs IF of the then Elitserien. In the 2011–12 season the team finished the regular season in 4th, but won the league championship in the Playoffs. At the conclusion of the 2013–14 season, Gunderson signed with Jokerit of the Kontinental Hockey League, leaving Brynäs after totaling 111 points (26 goals, 85 assists) over three seasons. In his lone season at Jokerit, Gunderson scored 6 goals and 29 assists, and tallied 6 points in 10 playoff games. He then moved on to HC Dinamo Minsk in the KHL, where he posted 27 points (5 goals, 22 assists).

Gunderson returned to Brynäs IF for the 2016–17 season as an assistant captain, helping the team reach the SHL Playoff Finals.

Having completed his sixth season with Brynäs IF following the conclusion of the 2018–19 season, Gunderson opted to pursue a new challenge in agreeing to a one-year contract with Swiss club, HC Fribourg-Gottéron of the NL, on March 27, 2019.

== International play ==
On January 1, 2018, Gunderson was named to Team USA's roster to represent the United States at the 2018 Winter Olympics. He appeared in all five games, as the United States skated to a 7th-place finish.

== Career statistics ==
=== Regular season and playoffs ===
			Regular season					Playoffs
Season	Team	League	GP	G	A	Pts	PIM	GP	G	A	Pts	PIM
2001–02	New Jersey Jr. Titans 18U AAA	AYHL	17	5	14	19	10	—	—	—	—	—
2002–03	Mercer Chiefs U18 AAA	AYHL	16	8	27	35	2	—	—	—	—	—
2003–04	University of Vermont	ECAC	33	1	16	17	8	—	—	—	—	—
2004–05	University of Vermont	ECAC	38	0	14	14	12	—	—	—	—	—
2005–06	University of Vermont	HE	38	2	13	15	20	—	—	—	—	—
2006–07	University of Vermont	HE	39	1	14	15	8	—	—	—	—	—
2006–07	Columbia Inferno	ECHL	12	0	3	3	6	—	—	—	—	—
2007–08	Trenton Devils	ECHL	72	4	42	46	33	—	—	—	—	—
2007–08	Lowell Devils	AHL	3	0	0	0	0	—	—	—	—	—
2008–09	Trenton Devils	ECHL	72	5	53	58	20	7	0	3	3	0
2009–10	Houston Aeros	AHL	74	5	20	25	24	—	—	—	—	—
2010–11	Örebro HK	Allsv	52	11	28	39	12	10	0	5	5	2
2011–12	Brynäs IF	SEL	55	9	25	34	6	17	3	2	5	6
2012–13	Brynäs IF	SEL	55	9	27	36	16	4	1	0	1	0
2013–14	Brynäs IF	SHL	54	8	33	41	14	—	—	—	—	—
2014–15	Jokerit	KHL	58	7	29	36	16	10	0	6	6	2
2015–16	Dinamo Minsk	KHL	60	5	22	27	4	—	—	—	—	—
2016–17	Brynäs IF	SHL	52	4	23	27	8	20	0	10	10	4
2017–18	Brynäs IF	SHL	43	4	25	29	6	8	1	2	3	0
2018–19	Brynäs IF	SHL	52	8	30	38	18	—	—	—	—	—
2019–20	HC Fribourg–Gottéron	NL	50	8	27	35	16	—	—	—	—	—
2020–21	HC Fribourg–Gottéron	NL	51	9	36	45	8	5	0	1	1	4
2021–22	HC Fribourg–Gottéron	NL	50	4	25	29	12	9	1	7	8	0
2022–23	HC Fribourg–Gottéron	NL	52	8	30	38	4	2	0	0	0	0
SHL totals			311	42	163	205	68	49	5	14	19	10
KHL totals			118	12	51	63	20	10	0	6	6	2
NL totals			203	29	118	147	40	16	1	8	9	4

=== International ===
Year	Team	Event	Result	GP	G	A	Pts	PIM
2018	United States	OG	7th	5	0	0	0	0
Senior totals				5	0	0	0	0

== Awards and honors ==
Award	Year
ECHL
All-Rookie Team	2008
First All-Star Team	2009
SHL
Le Mat Trophy (Brynäs IF)	2012
KHL
All-Star Game	2015
