= Niklas Hansson =

Swedish ice hockey player (born 1995)

- Born: January 8, 1995 (age 31) Jonstorp, Sweden
- Height: 6 ft 0 in (183 cm)
- Weight: 181 lb (82 kg; 12 st 13 lb)
- Position: Defence
- Shoots: Right
- SHL team Former teams: HV71; Rögle BK; Texas Stars; EV Zug
- NHL draft: 68th overall, 2013; Dallas Stars
- Playing career: 2011–present

Niklas Hansson (born January 8, 1995) is a Swedish professional ice hockey defenceman who is currently playing with HV71 of the Swedish Hockey League (SHL). He was selected by the Dallas Stars in the 3rd round (68th overall) of the 2013 NHL entry draft.

== Playing career ==
Hansson made his Elitserien debut playing with Rögle BK during the 2012–13 Elitserien season.

At the conclusion of his first season with HV71 in 2015–16, Hansson agreed to a three-year, entry-level contract with his draft club, the Dallas Stars, on March 26, 2016. He immediately joined AHL affiliate, the Texas Stars, on an amateur try-out for the final stretch of their regular season and first round defeat in the post-season.

In the 2016–17 season, Hansson was loaned back to HV71 to continue his development. He contributed as a depth player to HV71's blueline, helping the club claim their fifth Championship in franchise history.

At the conclusion of his entry-level contract with the Dallas Stars following the 2018–19 season, having spent the entirety of his North American career in the AHL with affiliate, the Texas Stars, Hansson opted to return to his original hometown club, Rögle BK of the SHL. He signed a two-year contract on April 24, 2019.

On May 14, 2021, Hansson joined EV Zug of the National League (NL) on a two-year contract through the 2022–23 season. During his first season with the club, they won the National League championship. In October 2022, he signed a three-year extension with EV Zug. In July 2025, EV Zug terminated his contract, which was supposed to run one more season.

As a free agent, Hansson returned to the SHL, signing a three-year contract for a second tenure with HV71, on 18 July 2025.

== Career statistics ==
			Regular season					Playoffs
Season	Team	League	GP	G	A	Pts	PIM	GP	G	A	Pts	PIM
2010–11	Jonstorps IF	Div.2	18	0	2	2	2	—	—	—	—	—
2011–12	Rögle BK	J20	18	2	1	3	6	7	0	2	2	0
2012–13	Rögle BK	J20	39	3	20	23	47	2	0	0	0	0
2012–13	Rögle BK	SEL	9	0	0	0	4	—	—	—	—	—
2013–14	Rögle BK	J20	12	4	8	12	2	—	—	—	—	—
2013–14	Rögle BK	Allsv	47	2	11	13	16	16	1	9	10	6
2014–15	Rögle BK	Allsv	47	2	19	21	10	10	1	3	4	4
2014–15	Rögle BK	J20	—	—	—	—	—	1	2	0	2	2
2015–16	HV71	SHL	44	7	15	22	14	6	0	0	0	0
2015–16	Texas Stars	AHL	6	0	1	1	0	4	0	0	0	2
2016–17	HV71	SHL	46	1	10	11	12	2	0	0	0	0
2017–18	Texas Stars	AHL	70	1	10	11	38	—	—	—	—	—
2018–19	Texas Stars	AHL	65	7	15	22	34	—	—	—	—	—
2019–20	Rögle BK	SHL	41	3	18	21	14	—	—	—	—	—
2020–21	Rögle BK	SHL	49	6	18	24	16	14	3	3	6	6
2021–22	EV Zug	NL	48	11	31	42	26	15	2	5	7	8
2022–23	EV Zug	NL	23	3	9	12	6	10	0	2	2	0
2023–24	EV Zug	NL	45	2	17	19	30	11	3	0	3	29
2024–25	EV Zug	NL	41	1	20	21	16	2	0	0	0	0
SHL totals			189	17	61	78	60	22	3	3	6	6
NL totals			157	17	77	94	78	38	5	7	12	37

== Awards and honors ==
Award	Year
SHL
Le Mat Trophy (HV71)	2017
