= Grégory Hofmann =

Swiss ice hockey player (born 1992)

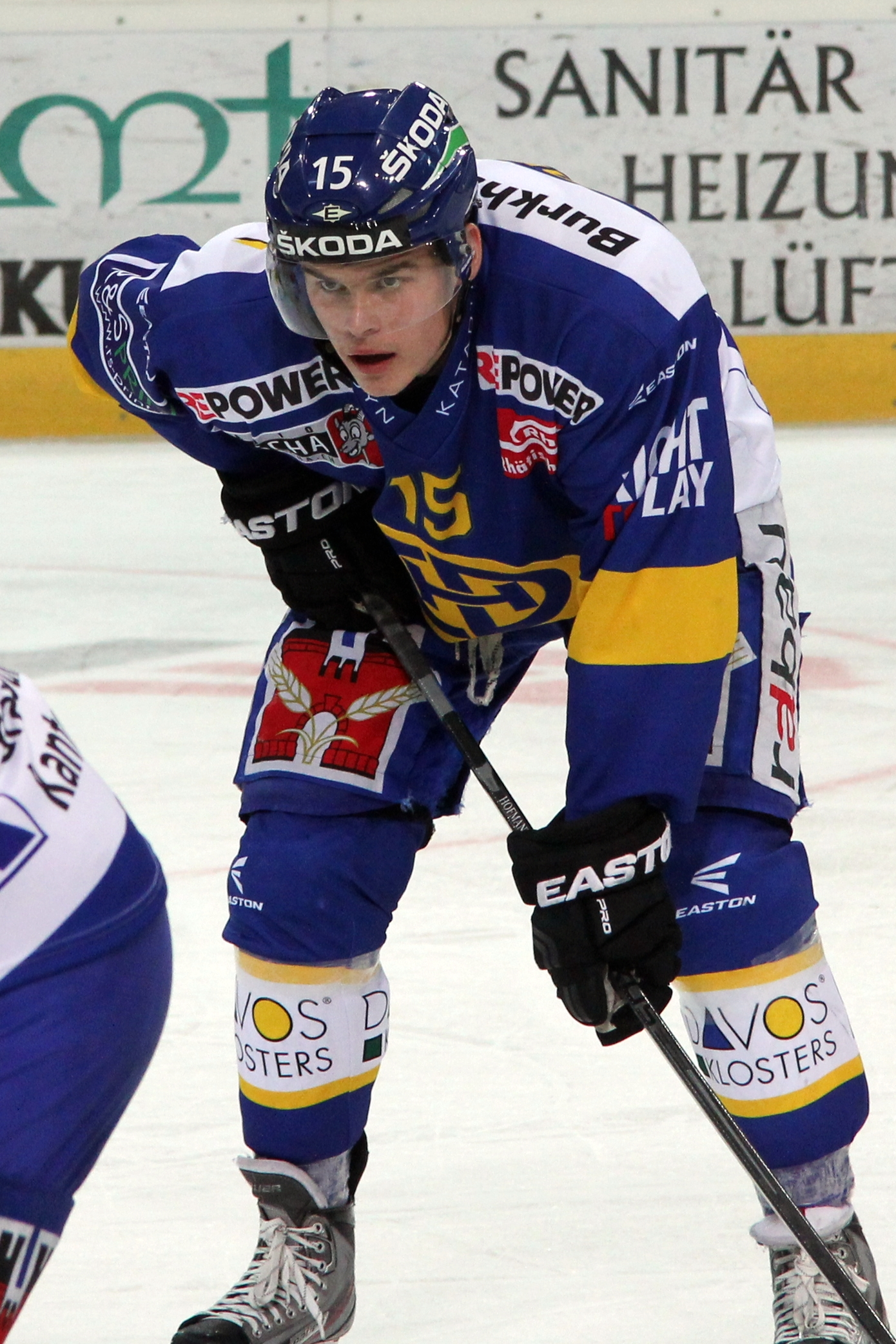
- Hofmann with HC Davos in 2014
- Born: November 13, 1992 (age 33) Biel, Switzerland
- Height: 6 ft 0 in (183 cm)
- Weight: 205 lb (93 kg; 14 st 9 lb)
- Position: Forward
- Shoots: Left
- NL team Former teams: EV Zug; Columbus Blue Jackets; HC Ambrì-Piotta; HC Davos; HC Lugano
- National team: Switzerland
- NHL draft: 103rd overall, 2011; Carolina Hurricanes
- Playing career: 2010–present

Grégory Hofmann (born November 13, 1992) is a Swiss professional ice hockey forward for EV Zug of the National League (NL). Hofmann was drafted in the third round, 103rd overall, by the Carolina Hurricanes in the 2011 NHL entry draft. He won two National League (NL) titles, one with HC Davos in 2015 and one with EV Zug in 2021.

== Playing career ==
On April 15, 2015, at the conclusion of the 2014–15 season, Hofmann left HC Davos after three seasons and signed a four-year contract with HC Lugano worth CHF 3.2 million.

Hofmann was invited to the 2017 Carolina Hurricanes rookie camp in September.

In the final year of his contract with Lugano, Hofmann agreed to a four-year contract worth CHF 4.8 million with EV Zug on December 3, 2018. The contract starts from the 2019–20 season and runs through the 2022–23 season.

While leading Zug in scoring through the 2020–21 season, on February 13, 2021, Hofmann's NHL rights were traded from the Carolina Hurricanes to the Columbus Blue Jackets in exchange for a 2022 7th round pick.

On June 14, 2021, Hofmann agreed as a free agent to a one-year one-way contract with the Columbus Blue Jackets of the National Hockey League (NHL). In his debut North American season, Hofmann made the Blue Jackets roster to start the 2021–22 season. On 14 October 2021, Hofmann made his long-awaited NHL debut against the Arizona Coyotes. On 25 October 2021, Hofmann scored his first NHL goal against the Dallas Stars. Hofmann registered two goals and 7 points through 24 regular season games before he was granted permission to return to Switzerland for the birth of his first child on 30 December 2021. Following the birth, Hofmann opted to remain in Switzerland due to family considerations, and he was suspended by the Blue Jackets on 10 January 2022. On 14 January 2022, Hofmann cleared waivers and the Blue Jackets terminated his contract, allowing him to return to EV Zug.

== International play ==
Medal record

Representing Switzerland

Ice hockey

World Championships
Silver medal – second place	2018 Denmark	
Silver medal – second place	2025 Sweden/Denmark	

Hofmann participated at the 2012 World Junior Ice Hockey Championships as a member of the Switzerland men's national junior ice hockey team.

Hofmann participated in the 2016 IIHF World Championship with Switzerland men's team. Selected again for the 2018 IIHF World Championship, he won a silver medal.

== Career statistics ==
=== Regular season and playoffs ===
			Regular season					Playoffs
Season	Team	League	GP	G	A	Pts	PIM	GP	G	A	Pts	PIM
2008–09	HC Ambrì–Piotta	SUI U17	15	8	11	19	34	—	—	—	—	—
2008–09	HC Ambrì–Piotta	SUI U20	22	10	7	17	26	2	0	0	0	2
2009–10	HC Ambrì–Piotta	SUI U20	34	25	30	55	20	3	1	2	3	6
2009–10	HC Ambrì–Piotta	NLA	1	0	0	0	0	—	—	—	—	—
2010–11	HC Ambrì–Piotta	SUI U20	2	2	0	2	2	—	—	—	—	—
2010–11	HC Ambrì–Piotta	NLA	41	3	9	12	2	—	—	—	—	—
2011–12	HC Ambrì–Piotta	SUI U20	7	3	1	4	2	—	—	—	—	—
2011–12	HC Ambrì–Piotta	NLA	34	5	1	6	6	—	—	—	—	—
2012–13	HC Davos	NLA	49	16	11	27	20	7	0	2	2	0
2013–14	HC Davos	NLA	41	7	10	17	30	—	—	—	—	—
2014–15	HC Davos	NLA	47	11	14	25	18	13	3	2	5	2
2015–16	HC Lugano	NLA	46	17	14	31	47	13	4	3	7	6
2016–17	HC Lugano	NLA	45	12	16	28	26	11	1	1	2	2
2017–18	HC Lugano	NL	45	22	17	39	22	18	14	7	21	8
2018–19	HC Lugano	NL	50	30	21	51	24	4	2	2	4	2
2019–20	EV Zug	NL	50	24	23	47	40	—	—	—	—	—
2020–21	EV Zug	NL	36	18	23	41	20	13	6	8	14	4
2021–22	Columbus Blue Jackets	NHL	24	2	5	7	8	—	—	—	—	—
2021–22	EV Zug	NL	17	11	9	20	6	15	5	5	10	2
2022–23	EV Zug	NL	33	13	23	36	10	11	3	1	4	6
2023–24	EV Zug	NL	28	8	12	20	6	—	—	—	—	—
2024–25	EV Zug	NL	43	19	14	33	22	4	1	0	1	0
2025–26	EV Zug	NL	48	16	17	33	16	7	1	2	3	4
NL totals			654	232	234	466	315	116	40	33	73	36
NHL totals			24	2	5	7	8	—	—	—	—	—

=== International ===
Year	Team	Event	Result	GP	G	A	Pts	PIM
2010	Switzerland	WJC18	5th	6	5	0	5	2
2011	Switzerland	WJC	5th	6	1	3	4	2
2012	Switzerland	WJC	8th	6	1	1	2	6
2016	Switzerland	WC	11th	7	1	1	2	0
2018	Switzerland	OG	10th	2	0	1	1	0
2018	Switzerland	WC	2nd place, silver medalist(s)	10	4	3	7	2
2019	Switzerland	WC	8th	8	3	0	3	0
2021	Switzerland	WC	6th	8	6	2	8	0
2022	Switzerland	OG	8th	5	0	0	0	0
2025	Switzerland	WC	2nd place, silver medalist(s)	5	1	2	3	2
Junior totals				18	7	4	11	10
Senior totals				45	15	9	24	4
