= Christian Djoos =

Swedish ice hockey player (born 1994)

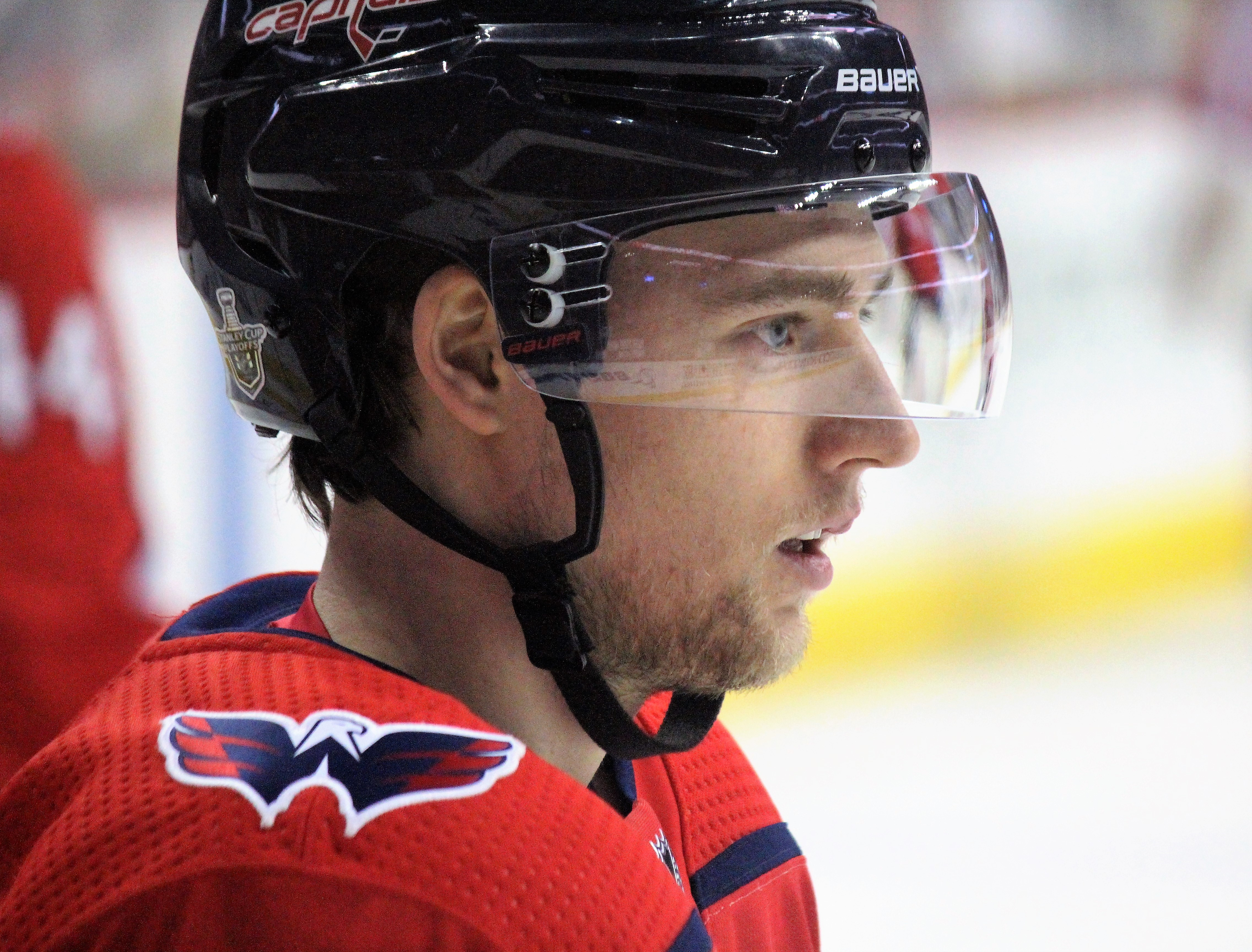
- Djoos with the Washington Capitals in 2018
- Born: 6 August 1994 (age 32) Gothenburg, Sweden
- Height: 6 ft 0 in (183 cm)
- Weight: 169 lb (77 kg; 12 st 1 lb)
- Position: Defence
- Shoots: Left
- SHL team Former teams: Brynäs IF; Washington Capitals; Anaheim Ducks; Detroit Red Wings; EV Zug; Lausanne HC
- NHL draft: 195th overall, 2012; Washington Capitals
- Playing career: 2011–present

Christian Djoos (born 6 August 1994) is a Swedish professional ice hockey defenceman for Brynäs IF of the Swedish Hockey League (SHL). Djoos was selected by the Washington Capitals in the seventh round (195th overall) of the 2012 NHL entry draft. Djoos won the Stanley Cup as a member of the Capitals in 2018. He is the son of former Swedish defenceman Pär Djoos.

== Playing career ==
Djoos made his Elitserien (now the Swedish Hockey League/ SHL) debut, playing one game with Brynäs IF during the 2011–12 season, and by the 2013–14 season, at the age of 19, he had developed into a regular SHL player for Brynäs.

He signed a three-year, entry-level contract with the Capitals on 16 May 2014.

Djoos made the Capitals' opening night roster to start the 2017–18 season. In his NHL debut, on 11 October 2017, he scored his first NHL goal and first NHL assist, with the Capitals against the Pittsburgh Penguins. Subsequently, Djoos became the first defenceman in Capitals history to score two points during his NHL debut.

In the 2019–20 season, Djoos was unable to make the Capitals' opening night roster. He was then placed on waivers, cleared, and was reassigned to continue in the AHL with the Hershey Bears. In a top-pairing role, Djoos added 32 points in 42 games with Hershey, appearing in a further two scoreless games with the Capitals. With limited NHL opportunities with the Capitals at the NHL trade deadline, on 24 February 2020, Djoos was dealt to the Anaheim Ducks in exchange for Daniel Sprong.

On 6 May 2020, Djoos signed a one-year extension with the Ducks. Before the 2020–21 season, on 8 January 2021, Djoos was placed on waivers by the Ducks after attending training camp. The following day, he was claimed by the Detroit Red Wings. Djoos remained on the Red Wings roster for the duration of the season, recording 2 goals and 11 points through 36 regular season games.

As an impending free agent from the Red Wings, Djoos left the NHL by joining Swiss club EV Zug of the National League (NL) on a two-year deal through the 2022–23 season on 12 May 2021. On 13 March 2023, Djoos signed a two-year contract with Lausanne HC of the NL. Djoos and Lausanne agreed to terminate the contract in the 2024 off-season, allowing Djoos to sign a five-year contract with his old club, Brynäs of the SHL.

== Career statistics ==
=== Regular season and playoffs ===
			Regular season					Playoffs
Season	Team	League	GP	G	A	Pts	PIM	GP	G	A	Pts	PIM
2009–10	Brynäs IF	J18	20	0	6	6	26	—	—	—	—	—
2009–10	Brynäs IF	J18 Allsv	15	4	6	10	40	4	1	1	2	4
2010–11	Brynäs IF	J18	21	7	20	27	22	—	—	—	—	—
2010–11	Brynäs IF	J18 Allsv	17	4	14	18	12	5	0	5	5	4
2010–11	Brynäs IF	J20	11	0	1	1	0	—	—	—	—	—
2011–12	Brynäs IF	J18	1	1	1	2	0	—	—	—	—	—
2011–12	Brynäs IF	J18 Allsv	6	4	7	11	4	5	1	0	1	2
2011–12	Brynäs IF	J20	40	3	21	24	22	2	0	0	0	0
2011–12	Brynäs IF	SEL	1	0	0	0	0	—	—	—	—	—
2012–13	Brynäs IF	J20	2	0	2	2	2	—	—	—	—	—
2012–13	Brynäs IF	SEL	47	2	6	8	38	4	0	0	0	0
2013–14	Brynäs IF	J20	1	0	1	1	0	1	0	0	0	0
2013–14	Brynäs IF	SHL	47	1	12	13	4	5	1	2	3	0
2014–15	Brynäs IF	SHL	50	5	12	17	22	7	1	1	2	8
2014–15	Hershey Bears	AHL	1	0	1	1	0	—	—	—	—	—
2015–16	Hershey Bears	AHL	62	8	14	22	8	21	2	7	9	8
2016–17	Hershey Bears	AHL	66	13	45	58	34	12	2	6	8	2
2017–18	Washington Capitals	NHL	63	3	11	14	10	22	0	1	1	4
2018–19	Washington Capitals	NHL	45	1	9	10	4	3	0	0	0	0
2018–19	Hershey Bears	AHL	2	0	0	0	2	—	—	—	—	—
2019–20	Hershey Bears	AHL	42	5	27	32	12	—	—	—	—	—
2019–20	Washington Capitals	NHL	2	0	0	0	0	—	—	—	—	—
2019–20	Anaheim Ducks	NHL	9	1	2	3	0	—	—	—	—	—
2020–21	Detroit Red Wings	NHL	36	2	9	11	14	—	—	—	—	—
2021–22	EV Zug	NL	50	3	24	27	12	15	4	8	12	2
2022–23	EV Zug	NL	52	9	27	36	12	11	0	3	3	29
2023–24	Lausanne HC	NL	49	4	24	28	6	18	0	6	6	4
2024–25	Brynäs IF	SHL	28	2	9	11	2	17	0	8	8	0
SHL totals			173	10	39	49	66	33	2	11	13	8
NHL totals			155	7	31	38	28	25	0	1	1	4

Medal record

Ice hockey

Representing Sweden

World Junior Championships
Silver medal – second place	2013 Ufa	
Silver medal – second place	2014 Malmö	

=== International ===
Year	Team	Event	Result	GP	G	A	Pts	PIM
2012	Sweden	U18	2nd place, silver medalist(s)	6	1	2	3	2
2013	Sweden	WJC	2nd place, silver medalist(s)	6	0	3	3	0
2014	Sweden	WJC	2nd place, silver medalist(s)	7	2	1	3	2
Junior totals				19	3	6	9	4

== Awards and honors ==
Award	Year
NHL
Stanley Cup champion	2018
