= Martin Gernát =

Slovak ice hockey player (born 1993)

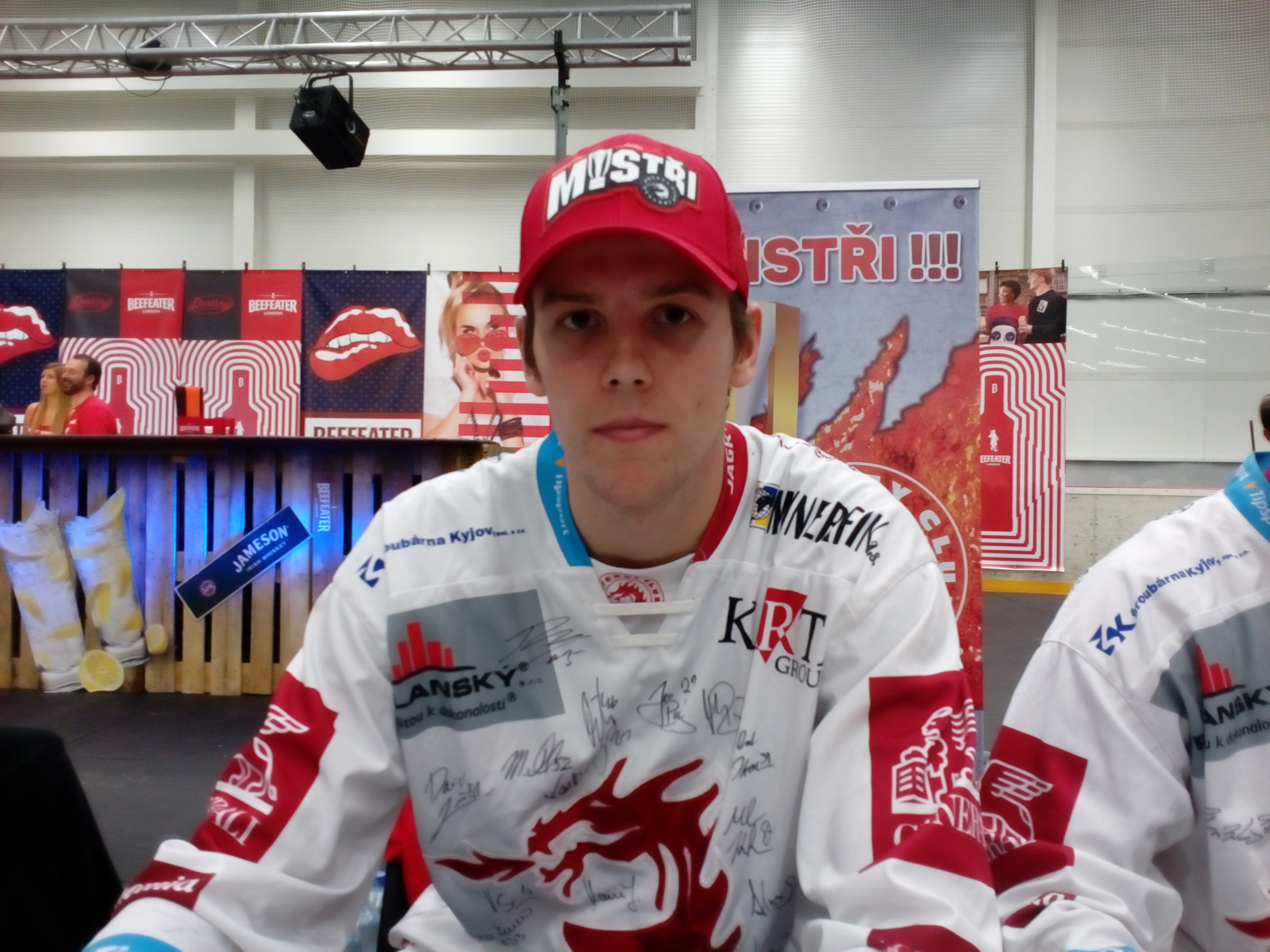
- Gernát with HC Oceláři Třinec in 2019
- Born: 11 April 1993 (age 33) Košice, Slovakia
- Height: 6 ft 5 in (196 cm)
- Weight: 187 lb (85 kg; 13 st 5 lb)
- Position: Defence
- Shoots: Left
- NL team Former teams: HC Davos; HC Sparta Praha; HC Košice; Lausanne HC; HC Oceláři Třinec; Lokomotiv Yaroslavl
- National team: Slovakia
- NHL draft: 122nd overall, 2011; Edmonton Oilers
- Playing career: 2013–present

Martin Gernát (born 11 April 1993) is a Slovak professional ice hockey player who is a defenceman for HC Davos of the National League (NL).

== Playing career ==
Gernát was drafted in the fifth round, 122nd overall, by the Edmonton Oilers in the 2011 NHL entry draft. After his draft selection, he would spend two seasons in the junior Western Hockey League with the Edmonton Oil Kings before signing a three-year entry-level contract with the Oilers on April 20, 2013. He spent the next three seasons playing in the American Hockey League for the Oklahoma City Barons and the Bakersfield Condors before he was traded to the Anaheim Ducks on February 29, 2016 for Patrick Maroon. He would play just five games for the Ducks' AHL affiliate the San Diego Gulls before signing for HC Sparta Praha for the 2016–17 season. Gernát broke his contract with Sparta Praha in July 2017.

On 7 June 2023, Gernát signed as a free agent to a one-year contract with Russian club, Lokomotiv Yaroslavl of the KHL, for the 2023–24 season. With Gernat in the lineup, Lokomotiv reached the Gagarin Cup finals three times in a row, winning the title twice: in 2025 and 2026.

After three successful seasons with Lokomotiv, Gernát moved to the Swiss National League by joining HC Davos on a one-year contract on 22 September 2026.

== International play ==
Gernát was selected to play for Slovakia at the 2012 World Junior Championships.

Medal record

Ice hockey

Representing Slovakia

Olympic Games
Bronze medal – third place	2022 Beijing	

== Career statistics ==
=== Regular season and playoffs ===
			Regular season					Playoffs
Season	Team	League	GP	G	A	Pts	PIM	GP	G	A	Pts	PIM
2008–09	HC Prešov 07	SVK.2 U18	41	6	28	34	36	—	—	—	—	—
2009–10	HC Prešov 07	SVK.2 U18	6	3	6	9	6	—	—	—	—	—
2009–10	HC Košice	SVK U18	41	4	24	28	22	—	—	—	—	—
2009–10	HC Košice	SVK U20	—	—	—	—	—	2	0	0	0	2
2010–11	HC Prešov 07	SVK U18	8	3	4	7	22	—	—	—	—	—
2010–11	HC Košice	SVK U18	9	3	4	7	24	—	—	—	—	—
2010–11	HC Košice	SVK U20	28	3	15	18	20	12	3	3	6	10
2011–12	Edmonton Oil Kings	WHL	60	9	46	55	46	20	7	6	13	8
2012–13	Edmonton Oil Kings	WHL	23	3	10	13	14	22	6	11	17	6
2013–14	Oklahoma City Barons	AHL	57	4	17	21	26	1	0	0	0	0
2013–14	Bakersfield Condors	ECHL	3	0	1	1	6	—	—	—	—	—
2014–15	Oklahoma City Barons	AHL	54	1	8	9	32	—	—	—	—	—
2015–16	Bakersfield Condors	AHL	22	0	3	3	14	—	—	—	—	—
2015–16	San Diego Gulls	AHL	5	0	0	0	2	—	—	—	—	—
2016–17	HC Sparta Praha	ELH	41	3	9	12	28	4	1	1	2	0
2017–18	HC Prešov Penguins	SVK.2	3	0	2	2	6	—	—	—	—	—
2017–18	HC Košice	Slovak	2	0	0	0	2	—	—	—	—	—
2017–18	Lausanne HC	NL	11	2	2	4	8	—	—	—	—	—
2018–19	HC Oceláři Třinec	ELH	48	8	12	20	52	13	0	5	5	16
2019–20	HC Oceláři Třinec	ELH	50	6	28	34	36	—	—	—	—	—
2020–21	HC Oceláři Třinec	ELH	50	13	28	41	28	16	1	6	7	14
2021–22	Lausanne HC	NL	46	13	16	29	24	8	4	1	5	9
2022–23	Lausanne HC	NL	46	8	19	27	55	—	—	—	—	—
2023–24	Lokomotiv Yaroslavl	KHL	64	8	18	26	27	20	5	5	10	12
2024–25	Lokomotiv Yaroslavl	KHL	63	5	26	31	26	21	2	3	5	4
2025–26	Lokomotiv Yaroslavl	KHL	59	12	19	31	40	22	1	4	5	24
ELH totals			189	30	77	107	144	33	2	12	14	30

=== International ===
Year	Team	Event	Result	GP	G	A	Pts	PIM
2011	Slovakia	WJC18	10th	6	0	1	1	2
2012	Slovakia	WJC	6th	6	1	1	2	2
2017	Slovakia	WC	14th	7	2	0	2	6
2021	Slovakia	WC	8th	8	1	1	2	2
2021	Slovakia	OGQ	Q	3	1	2	3	0
2022	Slovakia	OG	3rd place, bronze medalist(s)	7	0	2	2	4
2024	Slovakia	OGQ	Q	3	1	1	2	2
2026	Slovakia	OG	4th	6	1	3	4	2
Junior totals				12	1	2	3	4
Senior totals				34	6	9	15	16

== Awards and honors ==
Award	Year
KHL
Gagarin Cup champion	2025, 2026
