= Chris Baltisberger =

Swiss professional ice hockey player

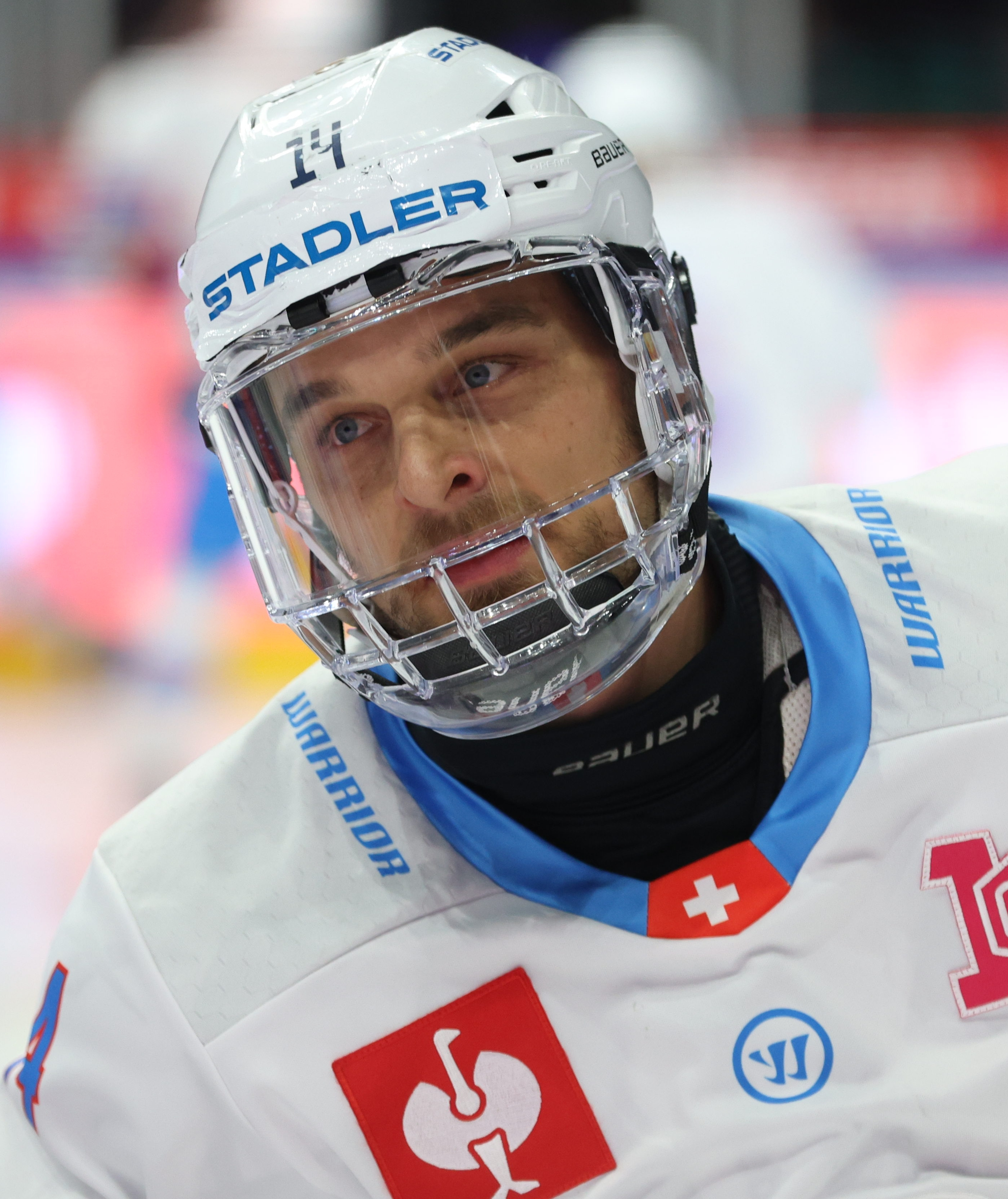
- Born: 31 October 1991 (age 34) Zofingen, Switzerland
- Height: 6 ft 0 in (183 cm)
- Weight: 196 lb (89 kg; 14 st 0 lb)
- Position: Right wing
- Shoots: Right
- NL team: ZSC Lions
- National team: Switzerland
- Playing career: 2010–present

Chris Baltisberger (born 31 October 1991) is a Swiss professional ice hockey right wing currently playing for ZSC Lions in the National League (NL).
