= Jeremy Wick =

Canadian-born Swiss ice hockey player

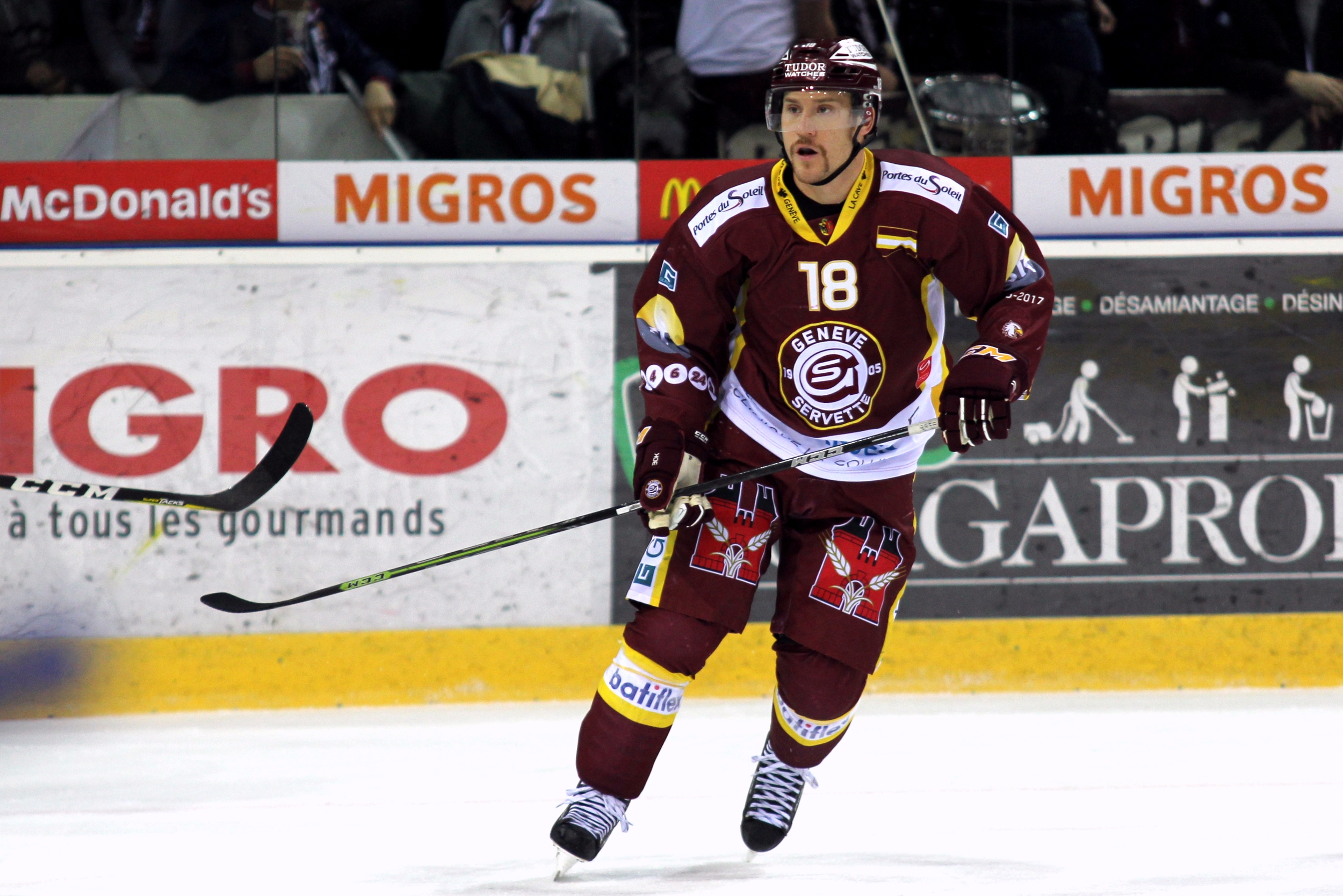
- Born: June 13, 1989 (age 35); Grand Valley, Ontario, Canada
- Height: 5 ft 10 in (178 cm)
- Weight: 185 lb (84 kg; 13 st 3 lb)
- Position: Right Wing
- Shoots: Right
- NL team Former teams: SC Rapperswil-Jona Lakers; Genève-Servette HC
- NHL draft: Undrafted
- Playing career: 2014–present

Jeremy Wick is a Canadian-born Swiss professional ice hockey right winger who is currently playing for the SC Rapperswil-Jona Lakers of the National League (NL). He previously played with Genève-Servette HC.

== Playing career ==
Wick played four seasons in the NCAA with St. Lawrence University.

On April 7, 2014, Wick signed a three-year contract with Genève-Servette HC of the National League (NL). He made his professional debut with Genève-Servette in the 2014-15 season and also spent parts of the season with their former affiliate, HC Red Ice of the Swiss League (SL).

On May 24, 2016, Wick was signed to a three-year contract extension by Geneva.

On December 11, 2019, Wick signed a two-year contract with the SC Rapperswil-Jona Lakers starting with the 2020/21 season and through the 2021/22 season.
