= Marco Müller =

Swiss ice hockey player

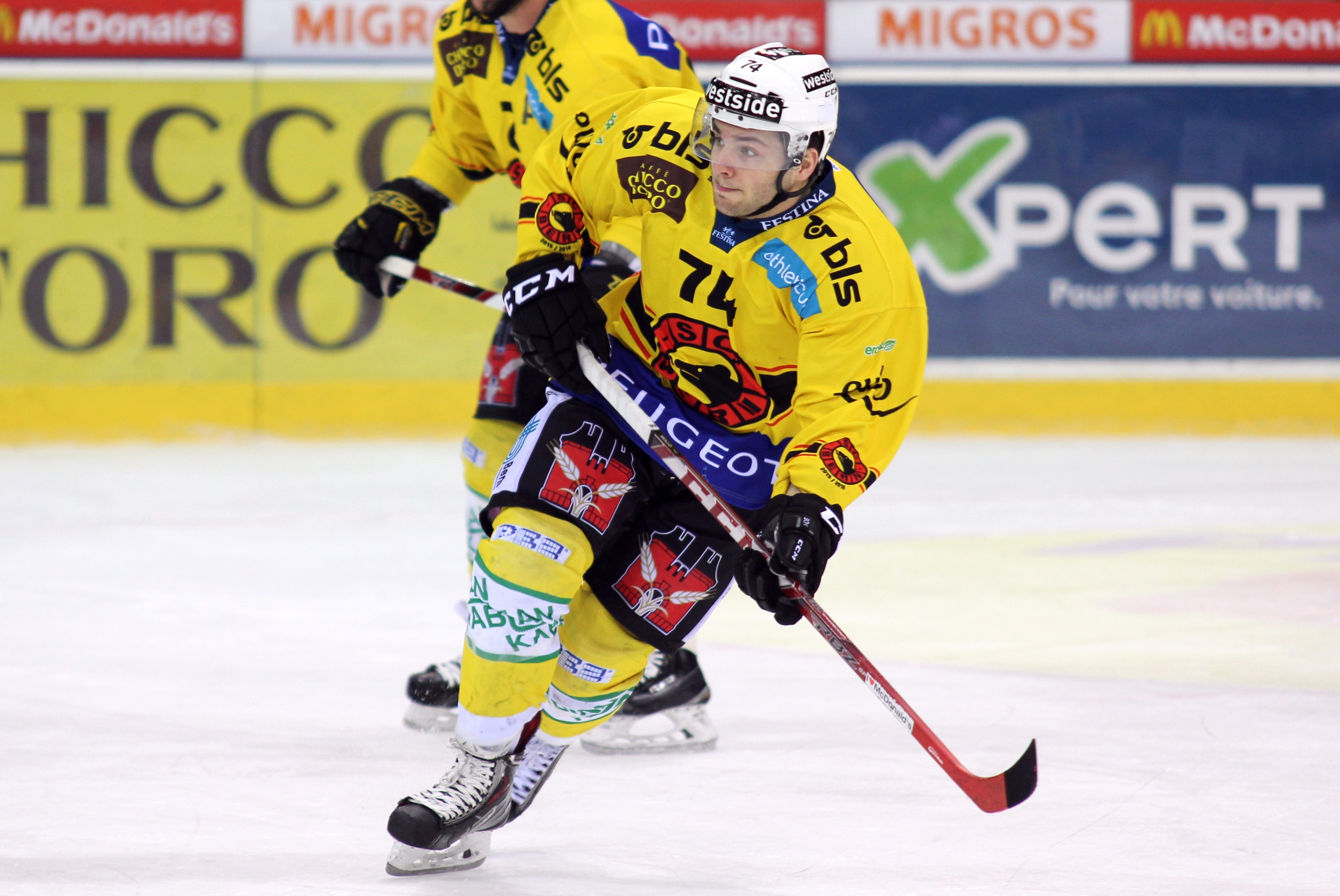
- Born: 21 January 1994 (age 32) Zuchwil, Switzerland
- Height: 5 ft 9 in (175 cm)
- Weight: 180 lb (82 kg; 12 st 12 lb)
- Position: Winger
- Shoots: Left
- NL team Former teams: HC Lugano; SC Bern; HC Ambrì-Piotta; EV Zug
- Playing career: 2012–present

Marco Müller is a Swiss professional ice hockey winger who is currently playing with HC Lugano of the National League (NL).

== Playing career ==
Müller made his professional debut with SC Bern in the 2011–12 season, appearing in 1 National League game this season. He eventually score his first NL goal with SC Bern in the 2014–15 season. Müller went on to play 118 NL games with Bern over 6 seasons, spending the majority of the time in the Swiss League with Bern's affiliates.

On 18 April 2017 Müller signed a three-year contract with HC Ambrì-Piotta. Müller had a breakout season in 2017–18 in his first year with Ambri, putting up 26 points (9 goals) in 47 NL contests. During his tenure with Bern, Müller won 2 NL titles.

On 28 January 2019 Müller agreed to an early two-year contract extension with HC Ambri-Piotta to keep him at the club through the 2021–22 season.

== International play ==
Müller was named to Switzerland's under-20 team for the 2014 IIHF World Junior Championships in Malmo, Sweden. He played 5 games with the team, putting up 1 assist.

Müller made his debut with Switzerland men's team in February 2019 and has yet to appear in an IIHF World Championship. A few days before the 2019 IIHF World Championship, Müller suffered from a broken finger, forcing him to sit out the World Championship.

== Awards and honours ==
Award	Year
NL
Champion (SC Bern)	2016, 2017
