= Fabian Heldner =

- Born: 24 June 1996 (age 28); Visp, Switzerland
- Height: 1.93 m (6 ft 4 in)
- Weight: 95 kg (209 lb; 14 st 13 lb)
- Position: Defence
- Shoots: Right
- NL team Former teams: Lausanne HC; HC Davos
- National team: Switzerland
- Playing career: 2013–present

Fabian Heldner (born 24 June 1996) is a Swiss ice hockey player for Lausanne HC in the National League (NL) and the Swiss national team.

He represented Switzerland at the 2021 IIHF World Championship.
