= Sven Leuenberger =

Swiss ice hockey player

- Born: 25 August 1969 (age 56) Niederuzwil, SUI
- Height: 6 ft 0 in (183 cm)
- Weight: 185 lb (84 kg; 13 st 3 lb)
- Position: Defence
- Shot: Left
- Played for: SC Bern (NLA); HC Lugano (NLA); EHC Uzwil
- National team: Switzerland
- Playing career: 1987–2003

Sven Leuenberger (born 25 August 1969 in Niederuzwil, Switzerland) is a Swiss former professional ice hockey defenceman.

He is currently the general manager for the ZSC Lions.

== Career ==
Playing in the NLA, Leuenberger accumulated 74 goals, 173 assists, and 443 penalty minutes in the regular season.

Leuenberger served as General Manager for SC Bern from 2006 to December 2015. He went on to coach Bern U20 team for the remainder of the 2015–16 season.

On 1 August 2008 SC Bern's coach suffered, John van Boxmeer, a heart attack side-lining him for a month. During van Boxmeer's absence, General Manager Sven Leuenberger coached the team along with assistant coach Konstantin Kurashev.

== Career statistics ==
			Regular season					Playoffs
Season	Team	League	GP	G	A	Pts	PIM	GP	G	A	Pts	PIM
1987–88	EHC Uzwil	NLB	36	15	13	28	37	—	—	—	—	—
1988–89	SC Bern	NLA	35	2	6	8	22	11	2	4	6	8
1989–90	SC Bern	NLA	36	8	15	23	24	11	1	2	3	16
1990–91	SC Bern	NLA	36	2	13	15	24	9	0	3	3	4
1991–92	SC Bern	NLA	36	4	12	16	34	11	3	5	8	2
1992–93	HC Lugano	NLA	36	6	4	10	41	9	1	1	2	6
1993–94	HC Lugano	NLA	36	4	10	14	26	9	1	1	2	4
1994–95	SC Bern	NLA	35	5	11	16	34	6	2	1	3	2
1995–96	SC Bern	NLA	34	7	10	17	50	11	1	5	6	14
1996–97	SC Bern	NLA	46	7	20	27	22	13	0	2	2	2
1997–98	SC Bern	NLA	36	5	16	21	18	7	0	1	1	12
1998–99	SC Bern	NLA	45	4	25	29	54	6	0	1	1	6
1999–00	SC Bern	NLA	43	6	10	16	18	5	0	1	1	22
2000–01	SC Bern	NLA	44	7	5	12	26	10	0	4	4	12
2001–02	SC Bern	NLA	44	4	8	12	20	6	0	3	3	6
2002–03	SC Bern	NLA	37	3	8	11	30	13	3	4	7	8
NLA totals			579	74	173	247	443	137	14	38	52	124

== Achievements ==
- 1989 - NLA Champion with SC Bern
- 1991 - NLA Champion with SC Bern
- 1992 - NLA Champion with SC Bern
- 1997 - NLA Champion with SC Bern

== Awards ==
- His jersey number 16 has been retired by the SC Bern.

== International play ==
Sven Leuenberger played a total of 124 games for the Swiss national team.

He participated in the following tournaments:

- 3 A World Championships: 1991, 1992, 1993,
- 3 B World Championships: 1994, 1996, 1997
- 1 Olympic Games: 1992 in Albertville
