= ZSC Lions =

Swiss professional hockey team

- City: Zürich, Switzerland
- League: National League
- Founded: 1930
- Home arena: Swiss Life Arena
- Colors
- CEO: Peter Zahner
- General manager: Sven Leuenberger
- Head coach: Claude Julien
- Captain: Patrick Geering
- Affiliates: GCK Lions
- Website: www.zsclions.ch

Franchise history
- 1930–1997: Zürcher SC
- 1997–present: ZSC Lions

The Zürcher Schlittschuh Club Lions is a professional ice hockey team based in Zürich, Switzerland. The team competes in the National League (NL), the highest league in Switzerland. Its home arena is the 12,000-seat Swiss Life Arena. The team was founded in 1930 and played at the Dolder-Kunsteisbahn from its establishment until 1950. Between 1950 and 2022, it played at the Hallenstadion.

== History ==
ZSC Lions was formed in 1997 as a result of the merger of the two local teams: the highly popular Zürcher Schlittschuh Club (German for "Zürich Skating Club"), who was struggling financially in National League A, and the ice hockey section of Grasshopper Club Zürich of the National League B, backed by entrepreneur and billionaire Walter Frey.

ZSC was the first Swiss team to play in an indoor arena (Hallenstadion). The team won the Swiss championship in 1936, 1949 and 1961 and the Spengler Cup in 1944 and 1945. After the merger, the ZSC Lions won the Swiss championship in 2000, 2001, 2008, 2012, 2014 and 2018, and also won the IIHF Continental Cup in 2001 and 2002.

=== Champions Hockey League and Victoria Cup ===
During the 2008–09 Season, the ZSC Lions participated in the first ever Champions Hockey League. For the group stage, the team was placed in group D with HC Slavia Praha and Linköpings HC. The Lions qualified for the semi-finals with a 3–1 record, first place in the group. With team's wins against the Finnish Espoo Blues, 6–3 and 4–1 respectively, it qualified for the tournament final. The first leg of the final was held on January 21, 2009 in the Magnitogorsk Arena where the Lions came back from a 0–2 deficit to Metallurg Magnitogorsk to end with a 2–2 tie. The second leg was played a week later, on January 28, 2009, in the Diners Club Arena in Rapperswil-Jona, Switzerland. ZSC Lions won the game and the Silver Stone Trophy with a 5–0 victory.

With its victory in the Champions Hockey League, the ZSC Lions qualified to play the Chicago Blackhawks of the National Hockey League for the 2009 edition of the Victoria Cup challenge. Playing at home arena, the Lions upset the Blackhawks with a 2–1 victory, winning the trophy. It was the first time since 1991 that the Blackhawks had lost to a club in Europe.

== Honors ==
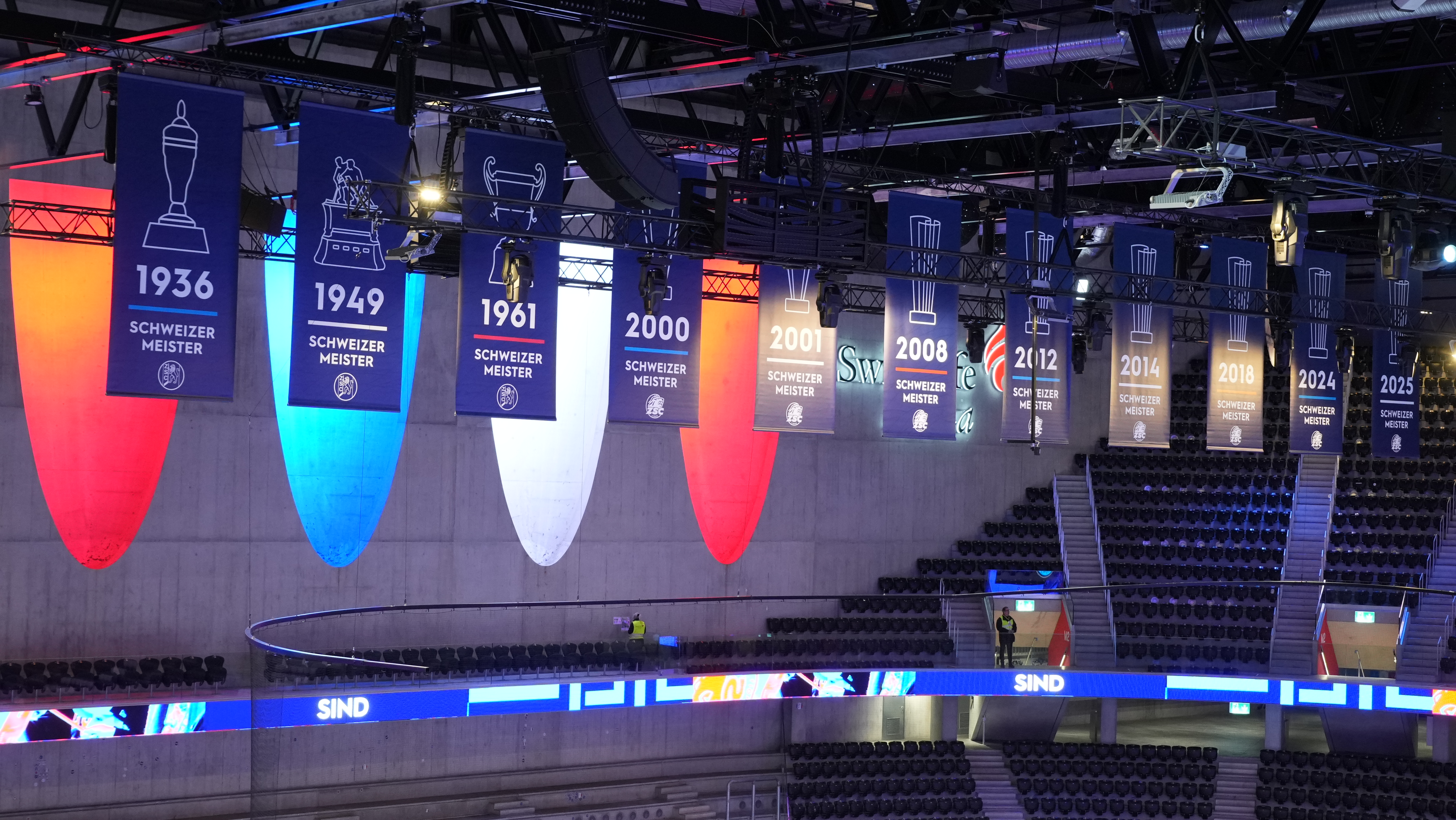

- Swiss Champions (11): 1936, 1949, 1961, 2000, 2001, 2008, 2012, 2014, 2018, 2024, 2025
- Victoria Cup (1): 2009
- Champions Hockey League (2): 2009 (Silver Stone trophy), 2025
- IIHF Continental Cup (2): 2001, 2002
- Swiss Cup (3): 1960, 1961, 2016
- Spengler Cup (2): 1944, 1945

== Players ==
=== Current roster ===
Updated 11 November 2026

No.	Nat	Player	Pos	S/G	Age	Acquired	Birthplace
10	(Switzerland)	Sven Andrighetto (A)	RW	L	33	2020	Sumiswald, Switzerland
79	(Switzerland)	Thierry Bader	C	L	29	2025	Winterthur, Switzerland
18	(Switzerland)	Nicolas Baechler	W	L	23	2023	Illnau-Effretikon, Switzerland
38	(Latvia)	Rūdolfs Balcers	LW	L	29	2023	Liepāja, Latvia
14	(Switzerland)	Chris Baltisberger	RW	R	35	2012	Zofingen, Switzerland
56	(Switzerland)	Tim Berni	D	L	26	2026	Männedorf, Switzerland
7	(Switzerland)	Timo Bünzli	D	L	21	2026	Zürich, Switzerland
28	(Sweden)	Jesper Frödén	RW	R	32	2023	Stockholm, Sweden
4	(Switzerland)	Patrick Geering (C)	D	L	36	2008	Zurich, Switzerland
27	(Canada)	Derek Grant	C	L	36	2023	Abbotsford, British Columbia, Canada
73	(Switzerland)	Kimo Gruber	C	L	21	2024	Bülach, Switzerland
30	(Czech Republic)	Šimon Hrubec	G	L	35	2022	Vimperk, Czech Republic
36	(Switzerland)	Simon Knak	W	L	24	2026	Zürich, Switzerland
46	(Switzerland)	Dean Kukan	D	L	33	2022	Volketswil, Switzerland
83	(Finland)	Juho Lammikko	C	L	30	2022	Noormarkku, Finland
44	(Finland)	Mikko Lehtonen (A)	D	L	32	2022	Turku, Finland
62	(Switzerland)	Denis Malgin (A)	C	R	29	2023	Olten, Switzerland
54	(Switzerland)	Christian Marti	D	L	33	2016	Bülach, Switzerland
8	(Switzerland)	Willy Riedi	W	L	28	2021	Dielsdorf, Switzerland
33	(Switzerland)	Jan Schwendeler	D	L	22	2024	Zug, Switzerland
13	(Switzerland)	Justin Sigrist	C	L	27	2019	Hombrechtikon, Switzerland
88	(Sweden)	Malte Strömwall	RW	R	32	2026	Luleå, Sweden
6	(Switzerland)	Yannick Weber (A)	D	R	38	2021	Morges, Switzerland
40	(Switzerland)	Robin Zumbühl	G	L	27	2024	Urdorf, Switzerland
