= 2019–20 National League (ice hockey) season =

2019–20 National League season
- League: National League
- Sport: Ice hockey
- Duration: September 13, 2019 – February 29, 2020
- Games: 50
- Teams: 12

Regular season
- Best record: ZSC Lions
- Runners-up: EV Zug
- Season MVP: Pius Suter (ZSC Lions)
- Top scorer: Pius Suter (ZSC Lions)

Playoffs

Swiss champion NL

National League seasons
- ← 2018–19 2020–21 →

The 2019–20 National League season was the 82nd season of Swiss professional ice hockey and the third season as the National League (NL).

ZSC Lions won the regular season, defeating EV Zug in the final round of matches.

SC Bern were the defending champions and three-time defending regular season winners, however for the second consecutive year the defending champion failed to make the playoffs.

Due to the 2018–19 league qualification series not being contested, the participating teams remained the same as the previous season.

The season was affected by the 2020 coronavirus outbreak in Switzerland, with the final two rounds of regular season games taking place without crowds, and the start of the playoffs postponed. On March 12, the National League committee announced that the playoffs would be cancelled, due to the ban on sporting events in the canton of Ticino.

== Teams ==
NL teams for the 2019–20 season

Team	City	Arena	Capacity
HC Ambrì-Piotta	Ambrì	Valascia	6,500
SC Bern	Bern	PostFinance-Arena	17,031
EHC Biel	Biel/Bienne	Tissot Arena	6,521
HC Davos	Davos	Vaillant Arena	6,800
Fribourg-Gottéron	Fribourg	BCF Arena	6,500
Genève-Servette HC	Geneva	Patinoire des Vernets	7,135
Lausanne HC	Lausanne	Vaudoise Aréna	10,000
HC Lugano	Lugano	Pista La Resega	7,800
SCL Tigers	Langnau im Emmental	Ilfis Stadium	6,000
SC Rapperswil-Jona Lakers	Rapperswil	Diners Club Arena	6,200
ZSC Lions	Zürich	Hallenstadion	11,200
EV Zug	Zug	Bossard Arena	7,200

== Regular season ==
Pos	Team	Pld	W	OTW	OTL	L	GF	GA	GD	Pts	Qualification
1	ZSC Lions	50	23	8	6	13	166	124	+42	91	Advance to Playoffs
2	EV Zug	50	23	7	7	13	147	124	+23	90	Advance to Playoffs
3	HC Davos	50	22	9	5	14	159	142	+17	89	Advance to Playoffs
4	Genève-Servette HC	50	24	6	5	15	140	116	+24	89	Advance to Playoffs
5	EHC Biel	50	19	6	9	16	151	144	+7	78	Advance to Playoffs
6	Lausanne HC	50	20	4	7	19	136	131	+5	75	Advance to Playoffs
7	Fribourg-Gottéron	50	17	10	2	21	122	136	−14	73	Advance to Playoffs
8	HC Lugano	50	19	4	4	23	125	139	−14	69	Advance to Playoffs
9	SC Bern	50	15	7	9	19	131	142	−11	68	Advance to Playouts (Note: Relegation Playoffs)
10	HC Ambrì-Piotta	50	15	5	8	22	120	136	−16	63	Advance to Playouts
11	SCL Tigers	50	15	4	10	21	117	148	−31	63	Advance to Playouts
12	SC Rapperswil-Jona Lakers	50	11	7	5	27	129	161	−32	52	Advance to Playouts

Source: NLA
Rules for classification: 1) points; 2) higher number of points earned in games between the tied teams; 3) goal difference; 4) number of goals scored; 5) goal difference in games between the tied teams; 6) number of goals scored in games between the tied teams; 7) higher number of away goals scored; 8) higher number of away goals scored in games between the tied teams; 9) NL committee decision. Rules

== Player statistics ==
=== Scoring leaders ===
The following players led the league in points, at the conclusion of the regular season. If two or more skaters are tied (i.e. same number of points, goals and played games), all of the tied skaters are shown.

Player	Team	GP	G	A	Pts	+/–	PIM
Pius Suter	ZSC Lions	50	30	23	53	+23	16
Mark Arcobello	SC Bern	50	15	33	48	0	22
Garrett Roe	ZSC Lions	44	13	35	48	+15	20
Grégory Hofmann	EV Zug	50	24	23	47	+14	40
Toni Rajala	EHC Biel	50	23	23	46	+7	10
Jan Kovář	EV Zug	50	14	31	45	+19	48
Kevin Clark	SC Rapperswil-Jona Lakers	48	23	21	44	-8	34
Daniel Winnik	Genève-Servette HC	49	22	22	44	+19	48
Matt D'Agostini	HC Ambrì-Piotta	46	20	22	42	-4	26
Harri Pesonen	SCL Tigers	48	18	24	42	+13	44

=== Leading goaltenders ===
The following goaltenders led the league in goals against average, provided that they have played at least 40% of their team's minutes, at the conclusion of the regular season.

Player	Team	GP	TOI	W	WO	LO	L	GA	SO	Sv%	GAA
Tobias Stephan	Lausanne HC	40	2284	17	2	4	10	82	4	.924	2.15
Tomi Karhunen	SC Bern	27	1634	10	4	2	8	60	2	.926	2.20
Leonardo Genoni	EV Zug	39	2306	17	3	3	10	87	5	.917	2.26
Reto Berra	Fribourg-Gottéron	44	2616	15	5	2	19	103	2	.924	2.36
Robert Mayer	Genève-Servette HC	32	1875	12	3	4	10	74	1	.914	2.37

== Playoffs ==
Quarter-Finals
1	ZSC Lions
8	HC Lugano
4	Genève-Servette HC
5	EHC Biel
(Pairings are reseeded after the first round)
2	EV Zug
7	Fribourg-Gottéron
3	HC Davos
6	Lausanne HC

Semi-Finals

Finals

== Relegation playoffs – Playouts ==
=== Ranking round ===
Pos	Team	Pld	W	OTW	OTL	L	GF	GA	GD	Pts
1	SC Bern	50	15	7	9	19	131	142	−11	68
2	HC Ambrì-Piotta	50	15	5	8	22	120	136	−16	63
3	SCL Tigers	50	15	4	10	21	117	148	−31	63
4	SC Rapperswil-Jona Lakers	50	11	7	5	27	129	161	−32	52

Source: NLA
Rules for classification: 1) points; 2) higher number of points earned in games between the tied teams; 3) goal difference; 4) number of goals scored; 5) goal difference in games between the tied teams; 6) number of goals scored in games between the tied teams; 7) higher number of away goals scored; 8) higher number of away goals scored in games between the tied teams; 9) NL committee decision. Rules

== Venues ==
This is Lausanne HC's first season in the Vaudoise Aréna, replacing Patinoire de Malley where they played from 1984 to 2017 and two seasons from 2017 to 2019 in the temporary 6,700-seat Malley 2.0. The team played its first regular-season game in the new venue on September 24, 2019, against Genève-Servette HC.

This is HC Fribourg-Gottéron's final season in the under-renovation BCF Arena. Starting with the 2020–21 season, the arena will have been completely renovated and the seating capacity will have shifted from 6,500 to 8,500.
