= 2024 Sweden Hockey Games =

2024 Beijer Hockey Games (Euro Hockey Tour)
Tournament details
- Host country: Sweden
- Cities: Karlskoga; Karlstad
- Venues: 2 (in 2 host cities)
- Dates: 8-11 February 2024
- Teams: 4

Final positions
- Champions: Finland (8th title)
- Runners-up: Sweden
- Third place: Czech Republic
- Fourth place: Switzerland

Tournament statistics
- Games played: 6
- Goals scored: 35 (5.83 per game)
- Attendance: 30,788 (5,131 per game)
- Scoring leader: (Finland) Eemil Erholtz (3 points)

Official website
- swehockey

The 2024 Beijer Hockey Games was played between 8 and 11 February 2024. The Czech Republic, Finland, Sweden and Switzerland played a round-robin for a total of three games per team and six games in total. One match was played in Karlskoga and the rest of the matches were played in Karlstad, Sweden. Finland won the tournament. The tournament was part of 2023–24 Euro Hockey Tour.

== Standings ==
Pos	Team	Pld	W	OTW	OTL	L	GF	GA	GD	Pts
1	Finland	4	3	0	0	1	10	5	+5	9
2	Sweden	3	2	0	1	0	10	5	+5	7
3	Czech Republic	3	1	0	0	2	8	11	−3	3
4	Switzerland	3	0	0	0	3	7	14	−7	0

Source: swehockey

== Games ==
All times are local. Karlskoga/Karlstad – (Central European Time – UTC+1)

8 February 2024; 18:00	Finland	4-2 (0-1, 1-0, 3-1)	Switzerland	Nobelhallen, Karlskoga; Attendance: 2,585

Game reference

Emil Larmi
Goalies
Joren Van Pottelberghe
Referees:
(Sweden) Christoffer Holm
(Czech Republic) Jiri Ondracek
Linesmen:
(Sweden) Gustav Jonsson
(Sweden) Emil Yletyinen

	0-1	01:26 – Bader (Rochette, Kessler)
29:53 – Erholtz (Hyry, Jääskä)	1-1
47:31 – Jääskä (Kemiläinen, Vittasmäki)	2-1
52:16 – Kaski (Sund, Puistola)	3-1
	3-2	53:40 – Marchon (Glauser)
54:46 – Huuhtanen (Puistola)	4-2

4 min
Penalties
4 min
23
Shots
28

8 February 2024; 19:00	Czech Republic	1-4 (1-2, 0-0, 0-2)	Sweden	Löfbergs Arena, Karlstad; Attendance: 6,621

Game reference

Jakub Malek
Goalies
Marcus Högberg
Referees:
(Switzerland) Riku Brander
(Switzerland) Michael Tscherrig
Linesmen:
(Sweden) Ludvig Lundgren
(Czech Republic) Jiri Ondracek

07:22 – Ruzicka (Rychlovský)	1-0
	1-1	17:46 – Johansson
	1-2	18:56 – Sylvegård (Wallmark, Sörensen)
	1-3	45:27 – De La Rose (Frödén, Nemeth)
	1-4	52:22 – Ejdsell (Strömwall)

6 min
Penalties
8 min
13
Shots
26

10 February 2024; 12:00	Finland	4-2 (1-0, 2-1, 1-1)	Czech Republic	Löfbergs Arena, Karlstad; Attendance: 3,147

Game reference

Lassi Lehtinen
Goalies
Šimon Zajíček
Referees:
(Sweden) Mikael Holm
(Switzerland) Michael Tscherrig
Linesmen:
(Sweden) Emil Yletyinen
(Sweden) Gustav Jonsson

03:18 – Hyry (Erholtz, Jääskä)	1-0
24:01 – Erholtz (Luoto, Hyry)	2-0
	2-1	29:50 – Kovar (Rychlovský, Radil)
38:02 – Nurmi (Kaski, Borgström) (PP)	3-1
	3-2	48:23 – Kase (Horak) (PP)
50:30 – Björninen	4-2

6 min
Penalties
6 min
24
Shots
27

10 February 2024; 16:00	Sweden	5-2 (3-0, 2-0, 0-2)	Switzerland	Löfbergs Arena, Karlstad; Attendance: 7,503

Game reference

Filip Larsson
Goalies
Stéphane Charlin
Referees:
(Czech Republic) Jiri Ondracek
(Finland) Riku Brander
Linesmen:
(Czech Republic) Jiri Ondracek
(Sweden) Rasmus Strömberg

05:10 – Nygård (Heed)	1-0
13:32 – Hardegård (Ejdsell)	2-0
19:45 – Lindberg (Ejdsell, Heed) (PP)	3-0
24:45 – Strömwall (Lindberg) (PP)	4-0
29:15 – Frödén (Tömmernes, De La Rose) (PP)	5-0
	5-1	43:49 – Senteler (Moy, Scherwey) (PP)
	5-2	59:30 – Kessler (Schmutz, Kreis) (PP)

6 min
Penalties
33 min
23
Shots
18

11 February 2024; 12:00	Switzerland	3-5 (1-0, 1-2, 1-3)	Czech Republic	Löfbergs Arena, Karlstad; Attendance: 2,682

Game reference

Connor Hughes
Goalies
Jakub Malek
Referees:
(Finland) Riku Brander
(Sweden) Mikael Holm
Linesmen:
(Sweden) Rasmus Strömberg
(Sweden) Ludvig Lundgren

14:37 – Simic (Bader)	1-0
	1-1	32:59 – Zámorský (Flynn, Jasek) (PP)
	1-2	38:23 – Vozenilek (Kral, Jasek)
39:57 – Marchon (Fora)	2-2
43:33 – Moy (Stadler)	3-2
	3-3	50:11 – Kase
	3-4	52:33 – Hájek (Gazda) (PP)
	3-5	58:57 – Vozenilek (Jasek)

6 min
Penalties
2 min
17
Shots
28

11 February 2024; 16:00	Sweden	1-2 (0-1, 0-1, 1-0)	Finland	Löfbergs Arena, Karlstad; Attendance: 8,250

Game reference

Marcus Högberg
Goalies
Emil Larmi
Referees:
(Switzerland) Michael Tscherrig
(Switzerland) Jiri Ondracek
Linesmen:
(Czech Republic) Jiri Ondracek
(Sweden) Emil Yletyinen

	0-1	04:58 – Suomi (Repo, Kemiläinen) (PP)
	0-2	37:24 – Jormakka (Suomi, Kapanen)
44:58 – Hardegård (Strömwall, Bengtsson)	1-2

4 min
Penalties
6 min
36
Shots
13

== Scoring leaders ==
Pos	Player	Country	GP	G	A	Pts	+/−	PIM	POS
1	Eemil Erholtz	Finland	3	2	1	3	+4	2	CE
2	Juha Jääskä	Finland	3	1	2	3	+4	0	LW
2	Arttu Hyry	Finland	3	1	2	3	+4	0	RW
4	Malte Strömwall	Sweden	3	1	2	3	+3	0	LW
5	Victor Ejdsell	Sweden	3	1	2	3	+2	0	LW

GP = Games played; G = Goals; A = Assists; Pts = Points; +/− = Plus/minus; PIM = Penalties in minutes; POS = Position
Source: swehockey

== Goaltending leaders ==
Pos	Player	Country	TOI	GA	GAA	Sv%	SO
1	Emil Larmi	Finland	120:00	3	1.50	95.31	0
2	Marcus Högberg	Sweden	117:25	3	1.53	88.46	0
3	Jakub Málek	Czech Republic	120:00	7	3.50	83.72	0

TOI = Time on ice (minutes:seconds); SA = Shots against; GA = Goals against; GAA = Goals Against Average; Sv% = Save percentage; SO = Shutouts
Source: swehockey
