= 2023 Karjala Tournament =

2023 Karjala Tournament (Euro Hockey Games)
Tournament details
- Host countries: Finland; Sweden
- Cities: Tampere; Växjö
- Venues: 2 (in 2 host cities)
- Dates: 9–12 November 2023
- Teams: 4

Final positions
- Champions: Czech Republic (3rd title)
- Runners-up: Sweden
- Third place: Finland
- Fourth place: Switzerland

Tournament statistics
- Games played: 6
- Goals scored: 35 (5.83 per game)
- Attendance: 41,369 (6,895 per game)
- Scoring leader: (Czech Republic) Radan Lenc (5 points)

Official website
- leijonat.com

The 2023 Karjala Tournament was played between 9 and 12 November 2023. The Czech Republic, Finland, Sweden and Switzerland played a round-robin for a total of three games per team and six games in total. One game was played in VIDA Arena, Växjö, Sweden (Sweden vs Czechia) all the other games were played at the Nokia Arena, Tampere. Czech Republic won the tournament. The tournament was part of 2023–24 Euro Hockey Tour.

== Standings ==
| Pos | Team | Pld | W | OTW | OTL | L | GF | GA | GD | Pts |
|---|---|---|---|---|---|---|---|---|---|---|
| 1 | Czech Republic | 3 | 3 | 0 | 0 | 0 | 13 | 5 | +8 | 9 |
| 2 | Sweden | 3 | 2 | 0 | 0 | 1 | 10 | 10 | 0 | 6 |
| 3 | Finland | 3 | 1 | 0 | 0 | 2 | 9 | 11 | −2 | 3 |
| 4 | Switzerland | 3 | 0 | 0 | 0 | 3 | 3 | 9 | −6 | 0 |

Source: eurohockey

== Games ==
All times are local. Helsinki – (Eastern European Time – UTC+2) Växjö – (Central European Time – UTC+1) Source

| 9 November 2025; 18:30 | Switzerland | 0-4 (0-2, 0-0, 0-2) | Finland | Nokia Arena, Tampere; Attendance: 7,875 |

Game reference

Reto Berra
Goalies
Christian Heljanko
Referees:
(Czech Republic) Jakub Sindel
(Sweden) Mikael Holm
Linesmen:
(Sweden) Ludvig Lundgren
(Finland) Tommi Niittylä

| 0-1 | 06:46 – Janne Kuokkanen (Kristian Vesalainen) |
| 0-2 | 16:01 – Antti Suomela |
| 0-3 | 47:15 – Antti Suomela (Ahti Oksanen) |
| 0-4 | 55:58 – Antti Suomela (Ahti Oksanen) (EN) |

2 min
Penalties
2 min
16
Shots
25

| 9 November 2025; 19:00 | Sweden | 2-5 (0-4, 1-1, 1-0) | Czech Republic | VIDA Arena, Växjö; Attendance: 5,750 |

Game reference

~~Carl Lindbom~~ Linus Söderström
Goalies
Jakub Malek

| | 0-1 | 01:42 – Radan Lenc (David Tomášek) |
| | 0-2 | 04:28 – David Tomášek (Radan Lenc, Pavel Kousal) |
| | 0-3 | 10:42 – Jakub Flek (Libor Zábranský, Petr Kodýtek) |
| | 0-4 | 15:16 – Lukas Sedlak (Michal Repik) |
| 28:26 – Tim Heed (Victor Ejdsell, Dennis Rasmussen) | 1-4 |
| | 1-5 | 30:41 – Adam Kubík |
| 48:58 – Victor Ejdsell (Joel Persson, Olle Alsing) | 2-5 |

4 min
Penalties
4 min
28
Shots
35

| 11 November 2025; 12:00 | Sweden | 4-3 (2-0, 1-1, 1-2) | Switzerland | Nokia Arena, Tampere; Attendance: 2,484 |

Game reference

Carl Lindbom
Goalies
~~Sandro Aeschlimann~~ Joren van Pottelberghe
Referees:
(Czech Republic) Jakub Sindel
(Finland) Mikko Kaukokari

| 17:59 – Mario Kempe (Marcus Sylvegård, Linus Johansson) (PP) | 1-0 |
| 19:04 – Max Friberg (Oscar Eklind) | 2-0 |
| 23:29 – Jesper Frödén (Joakim Nygård, Mario Kempe) | 3-0 |
| | 3-1 | 37:27 – Calvin Thürkauf (Tanner Richard) |
| | 3-2 | 46:54 – Sven Andrighetto (Dean Kukan, Lino Martschini) (PP) |
| 49:13 – Oscar Lindberg (Victor Ejdsell, Marcus Sylvegård) | 4-2 |
| | 4-3 | 54:28 – Tanner Richard (Lino Martschini, Dominik Egli) (PP) |

8 min
Penalties
4 min
23
Shots
30

| 11 November 2025; 16:00 | Finland | 3-7 (1-3, 2-2, 0-4) | Czech Republic | Nokia Arena, Tampere; Attendance: 11,159 |

Game reference

Roope Taponen
Goalies
Jakub Malek

| | 0-1 | 03:55 – Daniel Voženílek (Tomáš Filippi, Petr Zamorsky) (PP) |
| | 0-2 | 10:42 – Matej Stransky (Lukas Sedlak, Ondřej Kovařčík) |
| | 0-3 | 12:45 – Daniel Voženílek (Jakub Galvas, Martin Jandus) |
| 13:34 – Niko Huuhtanen (Hannes Björninen) | 1-3 |
| 25:10 – Antti Suomela (Sebastian Repo, Ahti Oksanen) | 2-3 |
| 27:15 – Eemil Erholtz (Juha Jääskä, Jesper Mattila) | 3-3 |
| | 3-4 | 36:34 – David Tomášek (Tomáš Filippi, Daniel Voženílek) (PP) |
| | 3-5 | 37:38 – Matej Stransky (Ondřej Kovařčík) |
| | 3-6 | 51:03 – David Tomášek (Pavel Kousal, Radan Lenc) |
| | 3-7 | 54:43 – Radan Lenc (EN) |

4 min
Penalties
8 min
15
Shots
27

| 12 November 2025; 12:00 | Czech Republic | 1-0 (1-0, 0-0, 0-0) | Switzerland | Nokia Arena, Tampere; Attendance: 2,459 |

Game reference
| Dominik Pavlát | Goalies | Joren van Pottelberghe | Referees: (Sweden) Mikael Holm (Finland) Joonas Kova |
| 17:14 – Radan Lenc (Michael Spacek, Matej Stransky) (PP) / 1-0 | | | Referees: (Sweden) Mikael Holm (Finland) Joonas Kova |
| 6 min | Penalties | 6 min | Referees: (Sweden) Mikael Holm (Finland) Joonas Kova |
| 24 | Shots | 26 | Referees: (Sweden) Mikael Holm (Finland) Joonas Kova |

| 12 November 2025; 16:00 | Finland | 2-4 (1-2, 0-2, 1-0) | Sweden | Nokia Arena, Tampere; Attendance: 11,642 |

Game reference

Christian Heljanko
Goalies
Daniel Marmenlind

| 03:52 – Henrik Borgström (Eemil Erholtz, Veli-Matti Vittasmäki) | 1-0 |
| | 1-1 | 10:58 – Mario Kempe (Anton Bengtsson, Olle Alsing) |
| | 1-2 | 18:31 – Oscar Lindberg (Tim Heed, Jesper Frödén) (PP) |
| | 1-3 | 27:46 – Mario Kempe (Niklas Hansson, Linus Johansson) (PP) |
| | 1-4 | 29:48 – Marcus Sylvegård (Victor Ejdsell, Marcus Hardegård) |
| 58:00 – Juha Jääskä (Niko Huuhtanen, Juuso Riikola) | 2-4 |

6 min
Penalties
12 min
25
Shots
21

== Scoring leaders ==
| Pos | Player | Country | GP | G | A | Pts | +/− | PIM | POS |
|---|---|---|---|---|---|---|---|---|---|
| 1 | Radan Lenc | Czech Republic | 3 | 3 | 2 | 5 | +2 | 0 | F |
| 2 | Antti Suomela | Finland | 3 | 4 | 0 | 4 | +3 | 0 | F |
| 3 | David Tomášek | Czech Republic | 3 | 3 | 1 | 4 | +2 | 0 | F |
| 4 | Mario Kempe | Sweden | 3 | 3 | 1 | 4 | -2 | 0 | F |
| 5 | Victor Ejdsell | Sweden | 3 | 1 | 3 | 4 | +1 | 2 | F |

GP = Games played; G = Goals; A = Assists; Pts = Points; +/− = Plus/minus; PIM = Penalties in minutes; POS = Position
Source: quanthockey
