= 2023 Swiss Ice Hockey Games =

2023 Swiss Ice Hockey Games (Euro Hockey Games)
Tournament details
- Host countries: Switzerland; Czechia
- Cities: Zürich; Prague
- Venues: 2 (in 2 host cities)
- Dates: 14-17 November 2023
- Teams: 4

Final positions
- Champions: Sweden (2nd title)
- Runners-up: Czech Republic
- Third place: Finland
- Fourth place: Switzerland

Tournament statistics
- Games played: 6
- Goals scored: 34 (5.67 per game)
- Attendance: 41,664 (6,944 per game)
- Scoring leader(s): (Switzerland) Sven Andrighetto (Sweden) Lawrence Pilut (4 points)

The 2023 Swiss Ice Hockey Games was played between 14 and 17 November 2023. The Czech Republic, Finland, Sweden and Switzerland played a round-robin for a total of three games per team and six games in total. Five of the games were played in Zürich, Switzerland and one game in Prague, Czech Republic. The tournament was won by Sweden.The tournament was part of the 2023–24 Euro Hockey Tour.

== Standings ==
Pos	Team	Pld	W	OTW	OTL	L	GF	GA	GD	Pts
1	Sweden	3	3	0	0	0	12	7	+5	9
2	Czech Republic	3	1	1	0	1	8	8	0	5
3	Finland	3	0	1	0	2	7	8	−1	2
4	Switzerland	3	0	0	2	1	7	11	−4	2

Source: eurohockey

== Games ==
All times are local. Zürich – (Central European Time – UTC+1) Prague – (Central European Time – UTC+1)

14 November 2023; 18:00	Czech Republic	2-1 (0-1, 1-0, 1-0)	Finland	O2 Arena, Prague; Attendance: 17,013

Game reference

Dominik Pavlát
Goalies
Harri Säteri
Referees:
(Sweden) Christoffer Holm
(Czech Republic) Miroslav Štolc

	0-1	07:03 – Aleksi Saarela (Eemeli Suomi, Juho Lammikko)
21:35 – David Tomášek (Pavel Kousal, Filip Pyrochta)	1-1
49:27 – Ondřej Kovařčík (Michal Kovařčík)	2-1

6 min
Penalties
10 min
28
Shots
21

14 November 2023; 19:30	Sweden	4-2 (2-0, 0-1, 2-1)	Switzerland	Swiss Life Arena, Zürich; Attendance: 5,013

Game reference

Lars Johansson
Goalies
Leonardo Genoni
Referees:
(Finland) Lasse Heikkinnen
(Czech Republic) Jan Hribik

15:37 – Malte Strömwall (Christian Folin, Lawrence Pilut)	1-0
16:34 – Henrik Tömmernes (Oskar Lang)	2-0
	2-1	30:08 – Calvin Thürkauf (Sven Andrighetto, Michael Fora)
44:53 – Malte Strömwall (Pontus Andreasson, Filip Berglund)	3-1
	3-2	50:27 – Andrea Glauser (Sven Andrighetto, Calvin Thürkauf) (PP)
58:42 – Lucas Wallmark (Lawrence Pilut) (EN)	4-2

8 min
Penalties
6 min
31
Shots
24

16 November 2023; 14:00	Finland	2-3 (1-1, 0-2, 1-0)	Sweden	Swiss Life Arena, Zürich; Attendance: 4,021

Game reference

Lassi Lehtinen
Goalies
Lars Johansson
Referees:
(Czech Republic) Cedric Borga
(Czech Republic) Jan Hribik

01:07 – Atte Ohtamaa	1-0
	1-1	19:33 – Adrian Wingerli
	1-2	25:12 – Jacob de la Rose (Malte Strömwall)
	1-3	36:50 – Malte Strömwall (Lucas Elvenes)
54:10 – Lauri Pajuniemi (Valtteri Kemiläinen, Atte Ohtamaa)	2-3

12 min
Penalties
4 min
16
Shots
23

16 November 2023; 14:00	Switzerland	2-3 OT (0–0, 0–2, 2–0) (OT: 0–1)	Czech Republic	Swiss Life Arena, Zürich; Attendance: 7,125

Game reference

Leonardo Genoni
Goalies
Josef Kořenář
Referees:
(Finland) Lasse Heikkinnen
(Sweden) Christoffer Holm

	0-1	25:15 – Jakub Rychlovský (Michal Kovařčík)
	0-2	27:03 – David Tomášek (PP)
41:11 – Tyler Moy (Attilio Biasca) (PP)	1-2
43:00 – Tristan Scherwey (Fabrice Herzog)	2-2
	2-3	61:57 – Michal Kempny

4 min
Penalties
8 min
23
Shots
27

17 November 2023; 13:00	Czech Republic	3-5 (0-1, 1-1, 2-3)	Sweden	Swiss Life Arena, Zürich; Attendance: 2,636

Game reference

Dominik Pavlát
Goalies
Daniel Marmenlind
Referees:
(Switzerland) Micha Hebeisen
(Finland) Lasse Heikkinen

	0-1	14:26 – Sebastian Hartmann (Jesper Sellgren)
32:59 – Pavel Kousal (David Tomášek)	1-1
	1-2	34:40 – Pontus Andreasson (Lucas Elvenes, Lawrence Pilut)
	1-3	49:07 – Pontus Andreasson
	1-4	52:42 – Lucas Elvenes (Lawrence Pilut, Pontus Andreasson)
53:50 – Petr Kodýtek (Jakub Rychlovský)	2-4
59:01 – Radan Lenc (Tomáš Filippi)	3-4
	3-5	59:41 – Marcus Sörensen (PP)

2 min
Penalties
4 min
25
Shots
26

17 November 2023; 17:00	Switzerland	3-4 OT (1-2, 1-0, 1-1) (OT: 0–1)	Finland	Swiss Life Arena, Zürich; Attendance: 5,856

Game reference

Joren van Pottelberghe
Goalies
Harri Säteri
Referees:
(Sweden) Christoffer Holm
(Czech Republic) Jan Hribik

	0-1	03:16 – Juuso Mäenpää (Miikka Salomäki, Arttu Hyry)
	0-2	41:01 – Arttu Hyry (Juuso Mäenpää)
15:35 – Christoph Bertschy (Sven Andrighetto)	1-2
35:55 – Calvin Thürkauf (Sven Andrighetto, Denis Malgin) (PP)	2-2
	2-3	50:05 – Lauri Pajuniemi (Elmeri Eronen, Juuso Mäenpää) (PP)
51:44 – Calvin Thürkauf (Dean Kukan, Tim Berni)	3-3
	3-4	64:05 – Jere Innala (Mikko Lehtonen, Juho Lammikko) (PP)

31 min
Penalties
33 min
38
Shots
30

== Scoring leaders ==
Pos	Player	Country	GP	G	A	Pts	+/−	PIM	POS
1	Sven Andrighetto	Switzerland	3	1	3	4	0	0	F
2	Lawrence Pilut	Sweden	3	0	4	4	0	0	D
3	Lukas Elvenes	Sweden	3	2	1	3	0	0	F
4	Malte Strömwall	Sweden	3	2	1	3	0	0	F
5	Calvin Thürkauf	Switzerland	3	2	1	3	+1	2	F

GP = Games played; G = Goals; A = Assists; Pts = Points; +/− = Plus/minus; PIM = Penalties in minutes; POS = Position
Source: quanthockey

== Goaltending leaders ==
Pos	Player	Country	TOI	GA	GAA	Sv%	SO
1	Harri Säteri	Finland	64:05	3	2.81	92.11	0
2	Josef Kořenář	Czech Republic	61:57	2	1.94	91.30	0
3	Leonardo Genoni	Switzerland	121:112	6	2.97	88.24	0
4	Lassi Lehtinen	Finland	59:16	3	3.04	86.96	0
5	Dominik Pavlát	Czech Republic	58:28	4	4.10	84.00	0
6	Lars Johansson	Sweden	120:00	4	2.00	83.33	0

TOI = Time on ice (minutes:seconds); SA = Shots against; GA = Goals against; GAA = Goals Against Average; Sv% = Save percentage; SO = Shutouts
Source: Swiss Ice Hockey
