= 2024 Czech Hockey Games =

2024 Betano Hockey Games (Euro Hockey Games)
Tournament details
- Host countries: Czechia; Switzerland
- Cities: Prague; Kloten
- Venues: 2 (in 2 host cities)
- Dates: 2-5 May 2024
- Teams: 4

Final positions
- Champions: Finland (7th title)
- Runners-up: Sweden
- Third place: Switzerland
- Fourth place: Czech Republic

Tournament statistics
- Games played: 6
- Goals scored: 24 (4 per game)
- Attendance: 32,660 (5,443 per game)
- Scoring leader: (Finland) Patrik Puistola (5 points)

The 2024 Betano Hockey Games was played between 2 and 5 May 2024. The Czech Republic, Finland, Sweden and Switzerland played a round-robin for a total of three games per team and six games in total. Five of the games were played in Brno, Czech Republic and one game in Kloten, Switzerland. The tournament was won by Finland. The tournament was part of the 2023–24 Euro Hockey Tour.

== Standings ==
Pos	Team	Pld	W	OTW	OTL	L	GF	GA	GD	Pts
1	Finland	3	2	1	0	0	11	5	+6	8
2	Sweden	3	2	0	1	0	7	5	+2	7
3	Switzerland	3	1	0	0	2	4	6	−2	3
4	Czech Republic	3	0	0	0	3	2	8	−6	0

Source: eurohockey.com

== Games ==
All times are local. Prague – (Central European Summer Time – UTC+2) Kloten – (Central European Summer Time – UTC+2)

2 May 2024; 18:00	Czech Republic	1-4 (0-0, 0-2, 1-2)	Finland	Winning Group Arena, Brno; Attendance: 7,312

Game reference

Lukáš Dostál
Goalies
Harri Säteri
Referees:
(Sweden) Andreas Harnebring
(Sweden) Michael Tscherrig

	0-1	29:01 – Vili Saarijärvi (Patrik Puistola, Pekka Jormakka) (PP)
	0-2	38:54 – Arttu Hyry (Patrik Puistola, Juuso Riikola)
	0-3	47:33 – Oliver Kapanen (Oliwer Kaski, Jesse Puljujärvi)
56:51 – Jáchym Kondelík (Matěj Stránskýy, David Špaček)	1-3
	1-4	59:38 – Jere Innala (Ahti Oksanen, Oliver Kapanen)

2 min
Penalties
6 min
37
Shots
16

2 May 2024; 19:45	Switzerland	1-2 (0-0, 0-0, 1-2)	Sweden	BCF Arena, Kloten; Attendance: 4,537

Game reference

Reto Berra
Goalies
Jesper Wallstedt
Referees:
(Czech Republic) Martin Fraňo
(Finland) Kristian Vikman

	0-1	51:28 – Fabian Zetterlund (Marcus Sörensen)
	0-2	52:25 – Jonas Brodin (Max Friberg)
55:02 – Calvin Thürkauf	1-2

2 min
Penalties
0 min
33
Shots
28

4 May 2024; 12:00	Switzerland	1-3 (0-0, 0-2, 1-1)	Finland	Winning Group Arena, Brno; Attendance: 4,519

Game reference

Akira Schmid
Goalies
Lassi Lehtinen
Referees:
(Sweden) Andreas Harnebring
(Czech Republic) Jan Hribik

	0-1	24:53 – Patrik Puistola (Axel Rindell)
	0-2	33:20 – Patrik Puistola (Valtteri Puustinen)
	0-3	48:43 – Julius Mattila (Oliwer Kaski)
50:51 – Tanner Richard	1-3

6 min
Penalties
4 min
36
Shots
29

4 May 2024; 16:00	Czech Republic	0-2 (0-0, 0-0, 0-2	Sweden	Winning Group Arena, Brno; Attendance: 7,207

Game reference
Petr Mrázek	Goalies	Filip Gustavsson	Referees: (Switzerland) Michael Tscherrig (Finland) Lassi Heikinnen
0-1 / 41:34 – Linus Johansson (Max Friberg); 0-2 / 58:41 – Patrik Nemeth (EN)			Referees: (Switzerland) Michael Tscherrig (Finland) Lassi Heikinnen
0 min	Penalties	4 min	Referees: (Switzerland) Michael Tscherrig (Finland) Lassi Heikinnen
34	Shots	12	Referees: (Switzerland) Michael Tscherrig (Finland) Lassi Heikinnen

5 May 2024; 12:00	Sweden	3-4 GWS (0-1, 2-2, 1-0) (OT: 0–0) (SO: 0–1)	Finland	Winning Group Arena, Brno; Attendance: 3,564

Game reference

Samuel Ersson
Goalies
Harri Säteri
Referees:
(Czech Republic) Antonín Jeřábek
(Switzerland) Michael Tscherrig

	0-1	17:19 – Eemeli Suomi (Rasmus Rissanen, Oliwer Kaski)
22:57 – Max Friberg (Rasmus Dahlin, Jesper Frödén)	1-1
	1-2	25:07 – Oliwer Kaski (Konsta Helenius, [[]])
27:48 – Felix Unger Sörum (Jonas Brodin, Rasmus Dahlin)	2-2
	2-3	29:31 – Patrik Puistola (Arttu Hyry)
51:03 – Jesper Frödén (Marcus Sörensen, Victor Olofsson) (PP)	3-3

Raymond (miss)
Burakovsky (miss)
Dahlin
Holtz (miss)
Shootout
(miss) Puustinen
Kaski
(miss) Oksanen
(miss) Helenius
8 min
Penalties
10 min
32
Shots
29

5 May 2024; 16:00	Czech Republic	1-2 (0-2, 0-0, 1-0)	Switzerland	Winning Group Arena, Brno; Attendance: 5,521

Game reference

Lukáš Dostál
Goalies
Leonardo Genoni
Referees:
(Sweden) Andreas Harnebring
(Finland) Lassi Heikinnen

	0-1	08:23 – Dario Simion (Fabrice Herzog, Michael Fora)
	0-2	19:41 – Calvin Thürkauf (Philipp Kurashev, Dominik Egli)
56:43 – Jakub Krejčík (Radim Zohorna, Jakub Flek)	1-2

10 min
Penalties
33 min
21
Shots
16

== Scoring leaders ==
Pos	Player	Country	GP	G	A	Pts	+/−	PIM	POS
1	Patrik Puistola	Finland	3	3	2	5	+3	0	F
2	Oliwer Kaski	Finland	3	1	3	4	+5	0	D
3	Max Friberg	Sweden	3	1	2	3	+1	0	F
4	Calvin Thürkauf	Switzerland	3	2	0	2	+1	0	F
5	Jonas Brodin	Sweden	3	1	1	2	+2	0	D

GP = Games played; G = Goals; A = Assists; Pts = Points; +/− = Plus/minus; PIM = Penalties in minutes; POS = Position
Source: quanthockey

== Goaltending leaders ==
Pos	Player	Country	TOI	GA	GAA	Sv%	SO
1	Filip Gustavsson	Sweden	60:00	0	0.00	100.00	1
2	Emil Larmi	Finland	60:00	1	1.00	97.22	0
3	Leonardo Genoni	Switzerland	60:00	1	1.00	95.24	0
4	Harri Säteri	Finland	125:00	4	1.92	94.37	0
5	Petr Mrázek	Czech Republic	55:59	1	1.07	90.91	0
6	Samuel Ersson	Sweden	65:00	3	2.77	89.66	0
7	Akira Schmid	Switzerland	57:26	3	3.16	89.66	0
8	Lukáš Dostál	Czech Republic	117:24	5	2.56	83.87	0

TOI = Time on ice (minutes:seconds); SA = Shots against; GA = Goals against; GAA = Goals Against Average; Sv% = Save percentage; SO = Shutouts
Source: swehockey
