= 2023–24 Euro Hockey Tour =

Ice hockey tournament

Tournament details
- Venues: 8 (in 8 host cities)
- Dates: 9 November 2023 – 5 May 2024
- Teams: 4

Final positions
- Champions: Sweden (7th title)
- Runners-up: Finland
- Third place: Czech Republic
- Fourth place: Switzerland

Tournament statistics
- Games played: 24
- Goals scored: 128 (5.33 per game)
- Attendance: 146,481 (6,103 per game)
- Scoring leader: (Switzerland) Calvin Thürkauf (7 points)

The 2023–24 Euro Hockey Tour was the 28th season of Euro Hockey Tour. It started in November 2023 and lasted until May 2024. It consisted of Karjala Tournament, Swiss Ice Hockey Games, Beijer Hockey Games and Czech Hockey Games.

== Standings ==
Pos	Team	Pld	W	OTW	OTL	L	GF	GA	GD	Pts
1	Sweden	12	9	0	1	2	39	27	+12	28
2	Finland	12	6	2	0	4	37	29	+8	22
3	Czech Republic	12	5	1	0	6	31	32	−1	17
4	Switzerland	12	1	0	2	9	21	40	−19	5

Source: Euro Hockey Tour

== Karjala Tournament ==
The Karjala Tournament was played between 9–12 November 2023. Five matches were being played in Tampere, Finland and one match in Växjö, Sweden. Tournament was won by Czech Republic.

Pos	Team	Pld	W	OTW	OTL	L	GF	GA	GD	Pts
1	Czech Republic	3	3	0	0	0	13	5	+8	9
2	Sweden	3	2	0	0	1	10	10	0	6
3	Finland	3	1	0	0	2	9	11	−2	3
4	Switzerland	3	0	0	0	3	3	9	−6	0

Source: Leijonat.com

9 November 2023
Switzerland	0–4	Finland
Sweden	2–5	Czech Republic
11 November 2023
Sweden	4–3	Switzerland
Finland	3–7	Czech Republic
12 November 2023
Czech Republic	1–0	Switzerland
Finland	2–4	Sweden

== Swiss Ice Hockey Games ==
The 2023 Swiss Ice Hockey Games was played between 14 and 17 December 2023. Five matches were played in Zürich, Switzerland and one match in Prague, Czech Republic. The tournament was won by Sweden.

Pos	Team	Pld	W	OTW	OTL	L	GF	GA	GD	Pts
1	Sweden	3	3	0	0	0	12	7	+5	9
2	Czech Republic	3	1	1	0	1	8	8	0	5
3	Finland	3	0	1	0	2	7	8	−1	2
4	Switzerland	3	0	0	2	1	7	11	−4	2

Source: Leijonat.com

14 December 2023
Czech Republic	2–1	Finland
Sweden	4–2	Switzerland
16 December 2023
Finland	2–3	Sweden
Switzerland	2–3 (OT)	Czech Republic
17 December 2023
Czech Republic	3–5	Sweden
Switzerland	3–4 (OT)	Finland

== Beijer Hockey Games ==
The 2024 Beijer Hockey Games was played between 8–11 February 2024. All the matches were played in Sweden, five in Karlstad and one in Karlskoga. Tournament was won by Finland.

Pos	Team	Pld	W	OTW	OTL	L	GF	GA	GD	Pts
1	Finland	3	3	0	0	0	10	5	+5	9
2	Sweden	3	2	0	0	1	10	5	+5	6
3	Czech Republic	3	1	0	0	2	8	11	−3	3
4	Switzerland	3	0	0	0	3	7	14	−7	0

Source: Leijonat.com

8 February 2024
Czech Republic	1–4	Sweden
Switzerland	2–4	Finland
10 February 2024
Finland	4–2	Czech Republic
Sweden	5–2	Switzerland
11 February 2024
Switzerland	3–5	Czech Republic
Sweden	1–2	Finland

== Czech Hockey Games ==
The 2024 Czech Hockey Games was played between 2–5 May 2024. Five matches were played in Brno, Czech Republic and one in Kloten, Switzerland. Tournament was won by Finland.

Pos	Team	Pld	W	OTW	OTL	L	GF	GA	GD	Pts
1	Finland	3	2	1	0	0	11	5	+6	8
2	Sweden	3	2	0	1	0	7	5	+2	7
3	Switzerland	3	1	0	0	2	4	6	−2	3
4	Czech Republic	3	0	0	0	3	2	8	−6	0

Source: Leijonat.com

2 May 2024
Czech Republic	1–4	Finland
Switzerland	1–2	Sweden
4 May 2024
Switzerland	1–3	Finland
Czech Republic	0–2	Sweden
5 May 2024
Sweden	3–4 (GWS)	Finland
Czech Republic	1–2	Switzerland
