= SHL Rookie of the Year =

Annual award in Swedish Hockey League

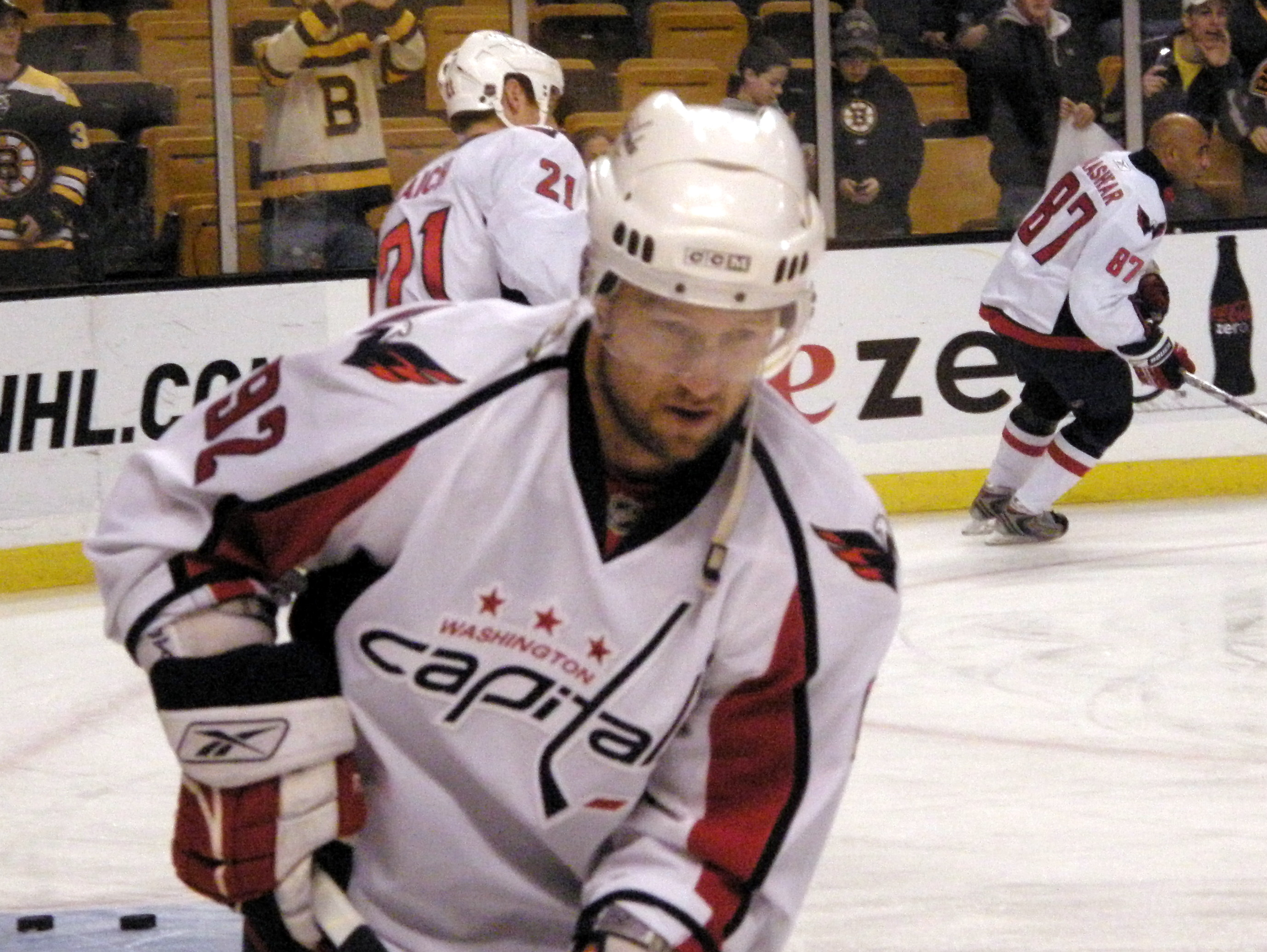
- Michael Nylander won the award during 1991-92 season
- Date: 1990
- Country: Sweden
- Currently held by: Ivar Stenberg

SHL Rookie of the Year (Swedish: Årets Rookie) is an annual award in the Swedish Hockey League (SHL), presented by Svenska Spel since the 1989–90 season. Djurgårdens IF has had eight winners of this award, more than any other team.

== Winners ==
Season	Player	Team (No.)
1989–90	Patrik Carnbäck	Västra Frölunda HC
1990–91	Tommy Söderström	Djurgårdens IF
1991–92	Michael Nylander	AIK
1992–93	Kenny Jönsson	Rögle BK
1993–94	Mats Lindgren	Färjestad BK
1994–95	Per Eklund	Djurgårdens IF (2)
1995–96	Jan Mertzig	Luleå HF
1996–97	Niklas Sjökvist	Färjestad BK (2)
1997–98	Pelle Prestberg	Färjestad BK (3)
1998–99	David Ytfeldt	Leksands IF
1999–2000	Mikael Tellqvist	Djurgårdens IF (3)
2000–01	Henrik Zetterberg	Timrå IK
2001–02	Rolf Wanhainen	Södertälje SK
2002–03	Tobias Enström	Modo Hockey
2003–04	Loui Eriksson	Västra Frölunda HC (2)
2004–05	Oscar Steen	Färjestad BK (4)
2005–06	Nicklas Bäckström	Brynäs IF
2006–07	Patric Hörnqvist	Djurgårdens IF (4)
2007–08	Daniel Larsson	Djurgårdens IF (5)
2008–09	Victor Hedman	Modo Hockey (2)
2009–10	Jacob Markström	Brynäs IF (2)
2010–11	Mattias Ekholm	Brynäs IF (3)
2011–12	Johan Larsson	Brynäs IF (4)
2012–13	William Karlsson	HV71
2013–14	Andreas Johnsson	Frölunda HC (3)
2014–15	Marcus Sörensen	Djurgårdens IF (6)
2015–16	Ludvig Rensfeldt	Rögle BK (2)
2016–17	Andreas Borgman	HV71 (2)
2017–18	Elias Pettersson	Växjö Lakers
2018–19	Emil Bemström	Djurgårdens IF (7)
2019–20	Jesper Frödén	Skellefteå AIK
2020–21	William Eklund	Djurgårdens IF (8)
2021–22	Linus Karlsson	Skellefteå AIK (2)
2022–23	Filip Bystedt	Linköping HC
2023–24	Jonathan Lekkerimäki	Örebro HK
2024–25	Melvin Fernström	Örebro HK (2)
2025–26	Ivar Stenberg	Frölunda HC(4)
