= Jakub Málek =

Czech ice hockey player (born 2002)

- Born: 11 April 2002 (age 24) Kroměříž, Czech Republic
- Height: 6 ft 4 in (193 cm)
- Weight: 190 lb (86 kg; 13 st 8 lb)
- Position: Goaltender
- Catches: Left
- NHL team (P) Cur. team Former teams: New Jersey Devils; Utica Comets (AHL); Ilves
- National team: Czech Republic
- NHL draft: 100th overall, 2021; New Jersey Devils
- Playing career: 2019–present

Jakub Málek (born 11 April 2002) is a Czech professional ice hockey player who is a goaltender for the Utica Comets of the American Hockey League (AHL) while under contract to the New Jersey Devils of the National Hockey League (NHL).

== Playing career ==
Málek made his first professional start at 16 years old on 30 January 2019, for VHK Vsetín of the second-tier Czech Chance Liga against HC Stadion Litoměřice, but was pulled midway through the match after conceding four goals.

Returning to the Chance Liga more permanently in the 2020–21 season, Málek recorded 8 wins and a .912 save percentage in 14 games. In 7 playoff games, he recorded a .927 en route to a semifinal exit at the hands of HC Dukla Jihlava. In 21 total games at the Chance Liga level, he recorded two shutouts. Despite not being ranked at all by NHL Central Scouting, he would be selected 100th overall in the fourth round of the 2021 NHL entry draft by the New Jersey Devils.

On 20 October 2021, early in the 2021–22 season, Málek became the first goalie in Chance Liga history to score a goal by shooting the puck directly into the net (as opposed to being credited with a goal he didn't directly score) when he scored an empty-net goal late in a 4–1 victory over AZ Havířov. He would play 31 games that season and post 22 wins, two shutouts, and a .932 save percentage, earning the league award for best goaltender and making a run to the Chance Liga finals.

Moving to Finland for the 2022–23 season, Málek signed a two-year contract with Ilves of the top-level Liiga on 3 May 2022. Early in the year, Málek was hospitalized for panic attacks caused by what he described as putting too much pressure on himself. After recovering, as well as some time playing in the second-tier Mestis, he returned to Ilves and finished the season with a .903 save percentage in 22 total games. In the playoffs, starting goaltender Marek Langhamer was unable to play midway through the semifinal series against the Lahti Pelicans, thrusting Málek into the starting role.

On 6 March 2024, Ilves exercised an option in Málek's contract to sign him to a one-year extension. On 6 May, Málek signed a two-year, entry-level contract with the Devils.

== International play ==
Málek was set to represent Czechia at the 2022 World Junior Championship, playing in one game before the tournament's cancellation due to the COVID-19 pandemic.

Málek made his senior international debut representing Czechia in the 2023 Karjala Tournament, part of the 2023–24 Euro Hockey Tour.

== Personal life ==
Málek is a supporter of the Forest Green Rovers football club. He initially discovered the team while playing EA Sports FIFA and is a fan of their environmentally conscious operations.

== Career statistics ==
			Regular season									Playoffs
Season	Team	League	GP	W	L	T/OT	MIN	GA	SO	GAA	SV%	GP	W	L	MIN	GA	SO	GAA	SV%
2018–19	VHK Vsetín	CZE.2	2	0	2	0	64	6	0	5.63	.750	—	—	—	—	—	—	—	—
2019–20	VHK Vsetín	CZE U20 2	31	20	8	0	1,692	64	2	2.27	.927	4	3	1	249	6	2	1.45	.942
2019–20	HC Valašské Meziříčí	CZE.3	3	1	1	0	127	7	0	3.31	—	—	—	—	—	—	—	—	—
2020–21	VHK Vsetín	CZE U20 2	2	2	0	0	120	4	0	2.00	.913	—	—	—	—	—	—	—	—
2020–21	HC Valašské Meziříčí	CZE.3	1	0	1	0	60	5	0	5.00	—	—	—	—	—	—	—	—	—
2020–21	VHK Vsetín	CZE.2	14	8	5	0	787	30	1	2.29	.912	7	3	4	438	14	1	1.92	.927
2021–22	VHK Vsetín	CZE U20 2	1	1	0	0	60	1	0	1.00	.976	—	—	—	—	—	—	—	—
2021–22	VHK Vsetín	CZE.2	31	22	9	0	1,847	60	3	1.95	.932	13	7	4	754	22	2	1.75	.933
2022–23	KOOVEE	Mestis	6	2	2	2	364	17	1	2.80	.912	—	—	—	—	—	—	—	—
2022–23	Ilves	Liiga	22	9	7	4	1,256	45	2	2.15	.903	3	1	2	175	7	0	2.39	.870
2023–24	Ilves	Liiga	27	16	4	5	1,528	59	2	2.32	.915	3	1	2	192	6	0	1.87	.910
2024–25	Ilves	Liiga	33	15	11	6	1,926	67	0	2.09	.909	1	1	0	63	4	0	3.81	.862
2025–26	Utica Comets	AHL	31	13	14	3	1,746	80	3	2.75	.895	—	—	—	—	—	—	—	—
2025–26	Adirondack Thunder	ECHL	2	1	0	1	126	4	0	1.91	.930	—	—	—	—	—	—	—	—
Liiga totals			82	40	22	15	4,711	171	4	2.18	.910	7	3	4	430	17	0	2.37	.887

== Awards and honors ==
Award	Year	Ref
Chance liga
Best Junior	2022	
Best Goaltender	2022	
All-Star Team	2022	
