= Malte Strömwall =

Swedish professional ice hockey forward (born 1994)

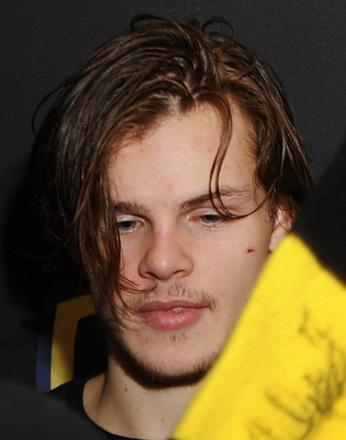
- Born: 24 August 1994 (age 32) Luleå, Sweden
- Height: 5 ft 11 in (180 cm)
- Weight: 181 lb (82 kg; 12 st 13 lb)
- Position: Right wing
- Shoots: Right
- SHL team Former teams: Frölunda HC; Växjö Lakers; Luleå HF; HV71; KooKoo; HC Sochi; SKA Saint Petersburg; Dinamo Minsk
- NHL draft: Undrafted
- Playing career: 2013–present

Malte Strömwall (born 24 August 1994) is a Swedish professional ice hockey forward who is currently playing for the ZSC Lions in the Swiss National League (NL).

== Playing career ==
Undrafted, Strömwall played in the 2015–16 season with AIK IF of the Swedish second tier, HockeyAllsvenskan. In recording 42 points in 49 games, he was signed as a free agent to a two-year entry-level contract with the New York Rangers on 17 April 2016.

In his first North American season in 2016–17, Strömwall was assigned by the Rangers to American Hockey League affiliate the Hartford Wolf Pack. In struggling to find his offensive touch, he recorded just 2 goals and 6 points in 44 games. Approaching his final contract year with the Rangers, Strömwall was unable to make an impression within the Rangers organization and was reassigned to start the 2017–18 season with secondary affiliate, the Greenville Swamp Rabbits of the ECHL on 10 October 2017. He recorded 2 points in 2 games with the Swamp Rabbits before he was placed on unconditional waivers by the Rangers in order for mutual release from his contract on 20 October 2017.

On 26 October 2017, Strömwall agreed to play the remainder of the season in Finland, joining KooKoo of the Liiga on a one-year deal. In April 2018, Strömwall made with KooKoo a one-year extension agreement. In the following 2018–19 season, Strömwall reached a new level to break out offensively, becoming the top scorer and forward of the Liiga, scoring 30 goals recording 57 points in just 52 games.

On 1 May 2019, Strömwall as a free agent left Finland agreeing to a one-year contract with Russian club, HC Sochi of the KHL. In the midst of his second season with Sochi, Strömwall was traded to perennial contending club, SKA Saint Petersburg, and played out the remainder of the 2020–21 campaign with the club.

As a free agent, Strömwall continued his career in the KHL, joining Belarusian club, HC Dinamo Minsk, on 31 August 2021. In the following 2021–22 season, he recorded 19 goals and 32 points in 38 regular-season games with Dinamo Minsk and added 4 points in as many playoff games.

On 15 July 2022, Strömwall made a long awaited return to the NHL, agreeing to a one-year, two-way contract with the Carolina Hurricanes. In the 2022–23 season, Strömwall was unable to break into the NHL, assigned for the duration of his contract with the Hurricanes AHL affiliate, the Chicago Wolves. He produced a professional high 33 assists, for 51 points in 68 regular season appearances.

Leaving the Hurricanes and North America as a free agent, Strömwall returned to his native Sweden in securing a two-year contract with Frölunda HC of the SHL on 10 August 2023.

== Personal life ==
Both Strömwall's father and step father played professional hockey.

== Career statistics ==
=== Regular season and playoffs ===
			Regular season					Playoffs
Season	Team	League	GP	G	A	Pts	PIM	GP	G	A	Pts	PIM
2010–11	Linköpings HC	J18	21	12	6	18	14	—	—	—	—	—
2010–11	Linköpings HC	J18 Allsv	18	5	7	12	4	5	2	0	2	0
2011–12	Tri-City Americans	WHL	64	11	16	27	33	15	3	4	7	6
2012–13	Tri-City Americans	WHL	66	21	45	66	36	5	1	4	5	2
2013–14	Växjö Lakers	J20	3	2	0	2	2	—	—	—	—	—
2013–14	Växjö Lakers	SHL	40	3	4	7	6	6	1	0	1	0
2013–14	IF Troja-Ljungby	Allsv	2	1	2	3	2	—	—	—	—	—
2014–15	Växjö Lakers	SHL	21	2	0	2	41	—	—	—	—	—
2014–15	Luleå HF	SHL	14	1	1	2	2	—	—	—	—	—
2014–15	Asplöven HC	Allsv	4	1	0	1	0	—	—	—	—	—
2014–15	HV71	SHL	12	3	0	3	4	6	0	1	1	0
2015–16	AIK IF	Allsv	49	25	17	42	26	10	1	0	1	2
2016–17	Hartford Wolf Pack	AHL	44	2	4	6	20	—	—	—	—	—
2017–18	Greenville Swamp Rabbits	ECHL	2	1	1	2	0	—	—	—	—	—
2017–18	KooKoo	Liiga	37	14	6	20	30	—	—	—	—	—
2018–19	KooKoo	Liiga	52	30	27	57	48	—	—	—	—	—
2019–20	HC Sochi	KHL	52	21	18	39	12	—	—	—	—	—
2020–21	HC Sochi	KHL	26	8	8	16	14	—	—	—	—	—
2020–21	SKA Saint Petersburg	KHL	21	8	1	9	6	10	1	2	3	2
2021–22	Dinamo Minsk	KHL	38	19	13	32	16	4	3	1	4	2
2022–23	Chicago Wolves	AHL	68	18	33	51	32	—	—	—	—	—
SHL totals			87	9	5	14	53	12	1	1	2	0
Liiga totals			89	44	33	77	78	—	—	—	—	—
KHL totals			137	56	40	96	48	14	4	3	7	4

=== International ===
Year	Team	Event	Result	GP	G	A	Pts	PIM
2011	Sweden	IH18	2nd place, silver medalist(s)	5	2	0	2	0
Junior totals				5	2	0	2	0

== Awards, honors and records ==
Awards	Year
Liiga
Veli-Pekka Ketola trophy	2018–19
Aarne Honkavaara trophy	2018–19
Kultainen kypärä Award	2018–19
