= Juha Jääskä =

Finnish ice hockey player (born 1998)

- Born: 9 February 1998 (age 28) Helsinki, Finland
- Height: 6 ft 0 in (183 cm)
- Weight: 196 lb (89 kg; 14 st 0 lb)
- Position: Forward
- Shoots: Left
- NHL team (P) Cur. team Former teams: Carolina Hurricanes; Chicago Wolves (AHL); HIFK
- National team: Finland
- NHL draft: Undrafted
- Playing career: 2016–present

Juha Jääskä (born 9 February 1998) is a Finnish professional ice hockey forward for the Chicago Wolves of the American Hockey League (AHL) while under contract to the Carolina Hurricanes of the National Hockey League (NHL). He previously played eight seasons for HIFK of the Finnish Liiga, as well 6 seasons with HIFK's junior system.

== Playing career ==
As an undrafted free agent, Jääskä was signed by the Carolina Hurricanes to a one-year, entry-level contract on 10 April 2024. He made his NHL debut for the Carolina Hurricanes on 2 January 2025 against the Florida Panthers, filling in for the injured Tyson Jost.

== Career statistics ==
=== Regular season and playoffs ===
			Regular season					Playoffs
Season	Team	League	GP	G	A	Pts	PIM	GP	G	A	Pts	PIM
2015–16	HIFK	Jr. A	39	8	16	24	24	4	0	1	1	2
2015–16	HIFK	Liiga	1	0	0	0	0	—	—	—	—	—
2016–17	HIFK	Jr. A	25	15	9	24	32	7	4	5	9	8
2016–17	HIFK	Liiga	13	0	2	2	2	8	1	0	1	0
2016–17	RoKi	Mestis	3	0	0	0	16	—	—	—	—	—
2017–18	HIFK	Jr. A	10	6	12	18	10	7	2	6	8	6
2017–18	HIFK	Liiga	26	1	4	5	10	13	2	0	2	2
2018–19	HIFK	Liiga	47	4	17	21	16	13	1	2	3	6
2019–20	HIFK	Liiga	28	2	8	10	10	—	—	—	—	—
2020–21	HIFK	Liiga	40	10	4	14	26	8	2	3	5	0
2021–22	HIFK	Liiga	42	12	11	23	30	—	—	—	—	—
2022–23	HIFK	Liiga	56	12	25	37	26	6	0	4	4	4
2023–24	HIFK	Liiga	57	10	20	30	40	7	5	2	7	4
2024–25	Chicago Wolves	AHL	53	12	21	33	38	2	1	0	1	2
2024–25	Carolina Hurricanes	NHL	18	0	4	4	9	—	—	—	—	—
Liiga totals			310	51	91	142	160	55	11	11	22	16
NHL totals			18	0	4	4	9	—	—	—	—	—

=== International ===
Year	Team	Event	Result	GP	G	A	Pts	PIM
2014	Finland	U17	4th	6	0	2	2	2
2015	Finland	IH18	4th	5	2	0	2	4
2016	Finland	U18	1st place, gold medalist(s)	7	0	1	1	8
2018	Finland	WJC	6th	5	0	1	1	2
2024	Finland	WC	8th	8	0	1	1	8
Junior totals				23	2	4	6	16
Senior totals				8	0	1	1	8
