= Petr Zámorský =

Czech professional ice hockey defenceman (born 1992)

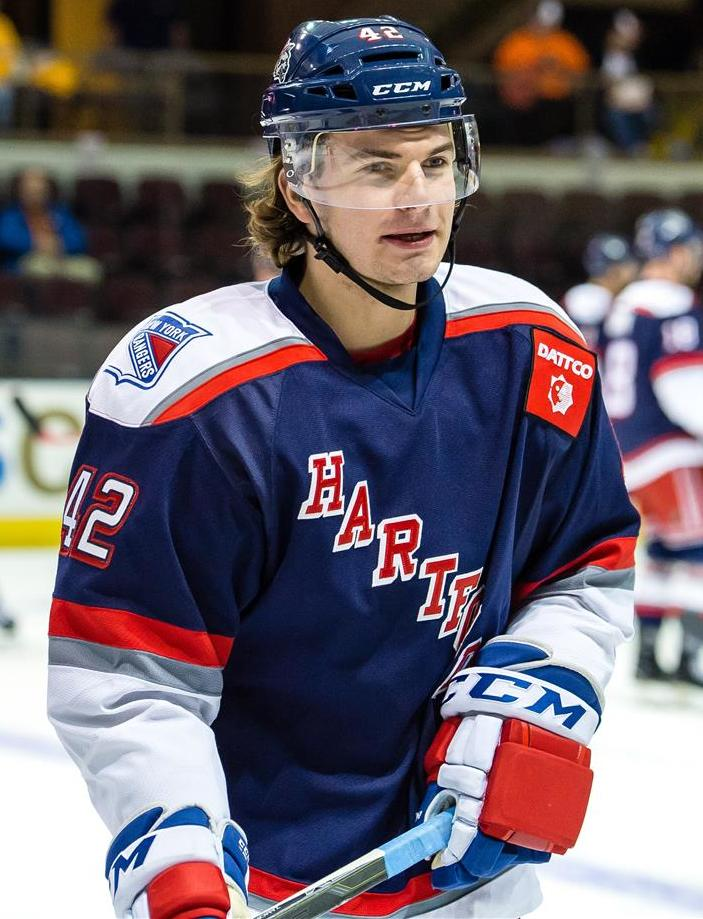
- Zámorský in 2015
- Born: August 3, 1992 (age 33) Zlín, Czechoslovakia
- Height: 6 ft 0 in (183 cm)
- Weight: 196 lb (89 kg; 14 st 0 lb)
- Position: Defence
- Shoots: Right
- ELH team Former teams: Mountfield HK; HC Zlín; Espoo Blues; Örebro HK; Hartford Wolf Pack; HC Sparta Praha
- National team: Czech Republic
- NHL draft: Undrafted
- Playing career: 2011–present

Petr Zámorský (born August 3, 1992) is a Czech ice hockey defenceman currently playing for Kometa Brno in the Czech Extraliga (ELH).

== Playing career ==
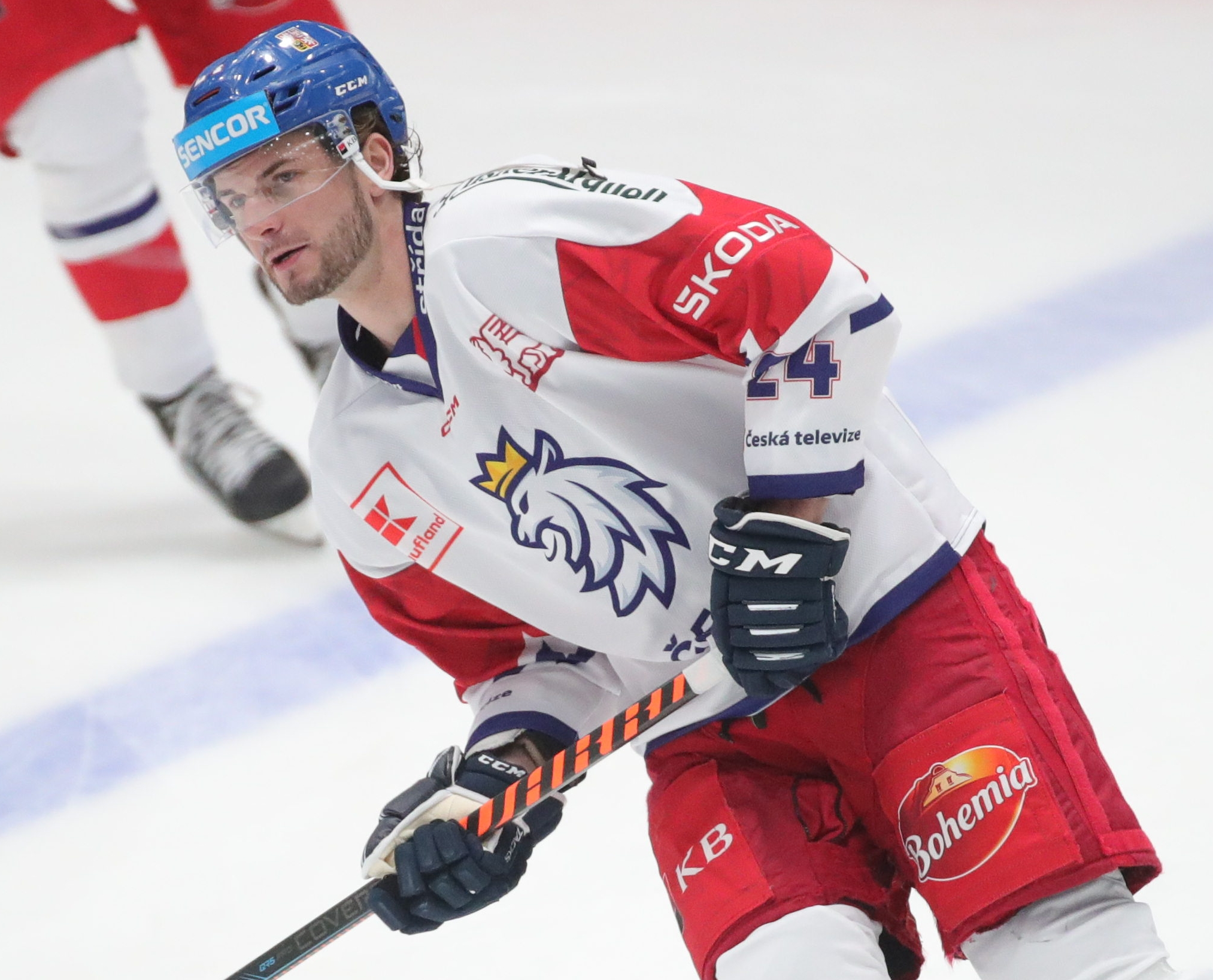
Zámorský with the Czech Republic (2023)

Although he was not selected in the NHL Entry Draft, Zámorský rose through the ranks of the PSG Zlín youth system and established himself as a promising defenceman in the Czech Extraliga. By his third full professional season in 2013–14, playing an instrumental role in the team's successful campaign that culminated in winning the Czech Extraliga championship. His standout performance that season earned him individual recognition as he was named the league's Best Defenseman. On May 5, 2014, Zámorský took the next step in his career by signing a two-year contract with the Espoo Blues of Finland's top-tier league, Liiga.

After making his debut at the senior international level during the 2014 World Championships, where he ranked second in scoring among Czech defensemen, Zámorský drew interest from the NHL. Exercising the NHL out clause in his contract with the Espoo Blues, he signed a two-year entry-level deal with the New York Rangers on June 11, 2014. He was loaned back to the Blues for the 2014–15 season, the first year of his NHL contract.

During his first season in North America in 2015–16, Zámorský took part in the Rangers' training camp and was assigned to their American Hockey League affiliate, the Hartford Wolf Pack, on September 23, 2015. After recording one goal and one assist over 10 games, he chose to return to Europe. The Rangers placed him on unconditional waivers, and his contract was officially terminated on November 17, 2015. A few days later, on November 23, he signed a two-year contract to rejoin Örebro HK of the Swedish Hockey League (SHL).

== Career statistics ==
=== Regular season and playoffs ===
			Regular season					Playoffs
Season	Team	League	GP	G	A	Pts	PIM	GP	G	A	Pts	PIM
2011–12	HC Zlín	ELH	37	1	4	5	34	12	0	0	0	6
2011–12	HC Hradec Kralove	Czech.1	1	0	1	1	0	—	—	—	—	—
2012–13	HC Zlín	ELH	37	8	5	13	30	16	0	4	4	34
2013–14	HC Zlín	ELH	44	7	11	18	80	14	4	5	9	24
2014–15	Espoo Blues	Liiga	25	3	3	6	18	—	—	—	—	—
2014–15	Örebro HK	SHL	10	1	4	5	8	6	2	2	4	4
2015–16	Hartford Wolf Pack	AHL	10	1	1	2	6	—	—	—	—	—
2015–16	Örebro HK	SHL	30	4	13	17	14	2	0	0	0	25
2016–17	Örebro HK	SHL	46	6	10	16	24	—	—	—	—	—
2017–18	HC Sparta Praha	ELH	15	2	0	2	10	—	—	—	—	—
2017–18	Mountfield HK	ELH	29	0	8	8	30	10	1	4	5	2
2018–19	Mountfield HK	ELH	50	10	28	38	38	4	0	0	0	12
ELH totals			212	28	56	84	222	56	5	13	18	78

=== International ===
Year	Team	Event	Result	GP	G	A	Pts	PIM
2010	Czech Republic	WJC18	6th	6	1	1	2	2
2012	Czech Republic	WJC	5th	5	0	2	2	6
2014	Czech Republic	WC	4th	10	0	3	3	12
Junior totals				11	1	3	4	8
Senior totals				10	0	3	3	12
