= David Tomášek =

Czech ice hockey player (born 1996)

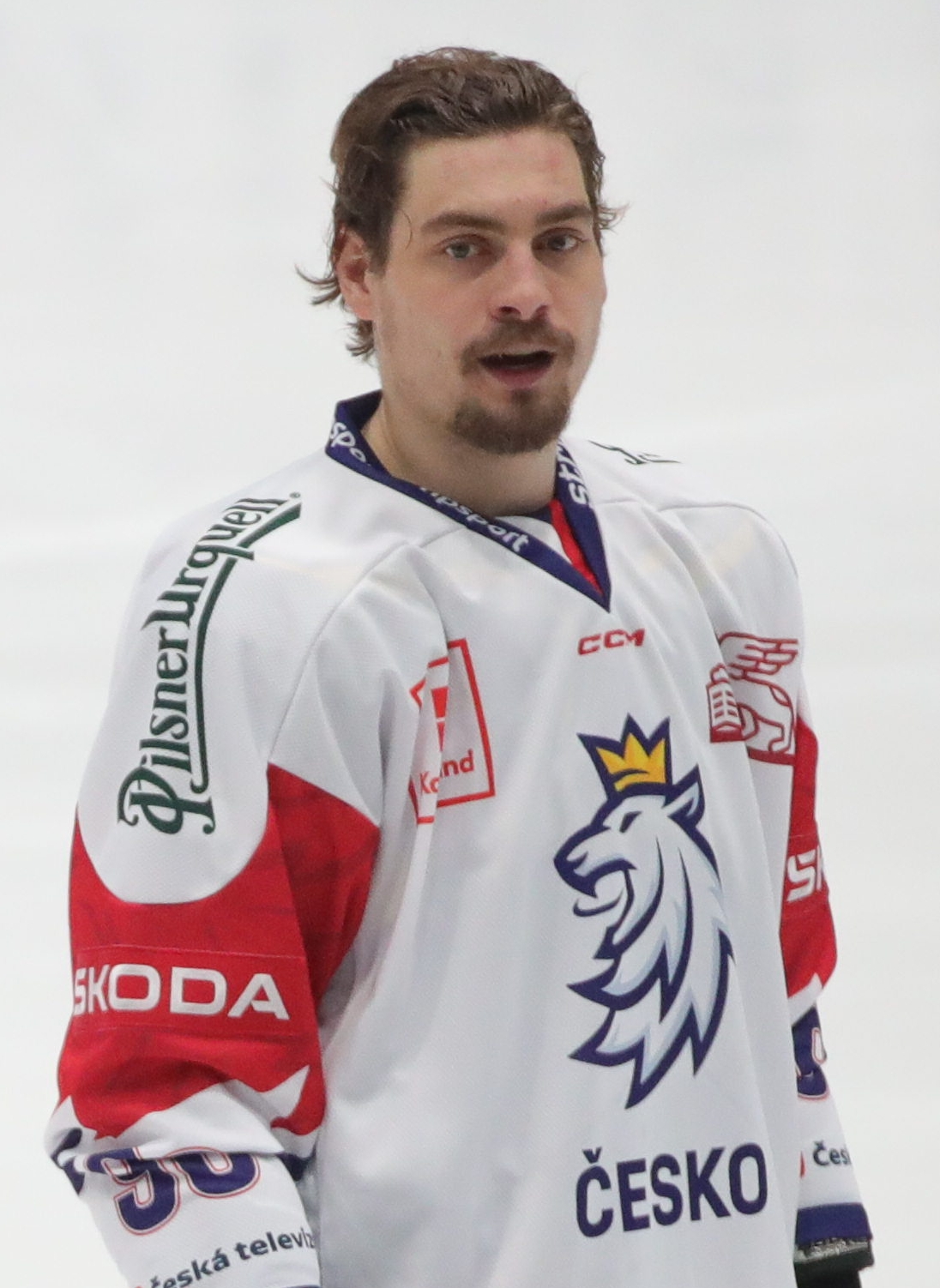
- Tomášek with Czechia in 2023.
- Born: 10 February 1996 (age 30) Prague, Czech Republic
- Height: 6 ft 2 in (188 cm)
- Weight: 210 lb (95 kg; 15 st 0 lb)
- Position: Forward
- Shoots: Right
- ELH team Former teams: HC Dynamo Pardubice; JYP Jyväskylä; HC Sparta Praha; Amur Khabarovsk; Färjestad BK; Edmonton Oilers
- National team: Czech Republic
- NHL draft: Undrafted
- Playing career: 2015–present

David Tomášek (Czech pronunciation: [ˈdavɪt ˈto.maːʃɛk]; born 10 February 1996) is a Czech professional ice hockey player who is a forward for HC Dynamo Pardubice of the Czech Extraliga (ELH). He previously played in the National Hockey League (NHL) for the Edmonton Oilers. He has also played in Liiga, the Kontinental Hockey League (KHL) and the Swedish Hockey League (SHL).

== Playing career ==
=== Early career ===
Tomášek began playing hockey at an early age and was a youth product of his hometown team, HC Sparta Praha. He graduated from their academy in 2010. Upon graduation, Tomášek pursued his hockey dream and moved to the United States for the next three years, attending High School in Michigan. In 2010–11, his first year overseas, he played for the Motor City Metal Jackets U14 AAA in the North American PHL (NAPHL) as a 14-year-old. For the next two years, Tomášek played in the Tier 1 Elite Hockey League (T1EHL) as a member of the Oakland Jr. Grizzlies U16 AAA, in which he was teammates with defenceman Jalen Chatfield in 2011–12 and later, goaltender Brandon Halverson in the Grizzlies' U18 AAA team in 2012–13.

Before his move, Tomášek also played in the 2009 Quebec International Pee-Wee Hockey Tournament with his minor ice hockey team from Chomutov. Two of his teammates at the time were forwards Jakub Vrána and Pavel Zacha, who would also become occasional teammates in future tournaments at the international level.

Tomášek was selected 56th overall by the Belleville Bulls of the Ontario Hockey League (OHL) in the 2013 Canadian Hockey League Import Draft. In his two seasons as a member of the Bulls, Tomášek totalled 27 points in 58 games in the 2013–14 OHL season and was named an alternate captain during his first year in Belleville. He would conclude his major junior career in North America, recording 31 points in 61 games in the 2014–15 OHL season.

=== Professional ===
==== European Leagues ====
After spending the previous five years overseas between the United States and Canada, Tomášek returned to the Czech Republic and made his debut for HC Dynamo Pardubice of the Czech Extraliga (ELH) during the 2015–16 Czech Extraliga season. He recorded 12 points in 40 games in his first professional season. His point totals would steadily increase in the following two seasons, as Tomášek would notch 21 points in 47 games in the 2016–17 season and 27 points in 47 games in the 2017–18 season.

After three years playing in the ELH, Tomášek signed a two-year contract on 15 April 2018 to join Finnish team, JYP Jyväskylä of Liiga for their 2018–19 Liiga season. His initial season in Finland was successful, as Tomášek recorded 33 points in 56 games played. After only ten games into the 2019–20 season, his contract with JYP was terminated on 2 October 2019. Tomášek signed a deal a few days later on 3 October, to play for his hometown team, HC Sparta Praha, for the remainder of their season. He recorded 24 points in 38 games in his first season. Tomášek continued to play for Praha for the 2020–21 season and improved on his point totals, registering 47 points in 50 games.

After two seasons playing back in his home country, Tomášek transferred to Amur Khabarovsk of the Kontinental Hockey League (KHL) for the 2021–22 KHL season. He played in 47 games and collected 21 points. The 2022 Russian invasion of Ukraine cut Tomášek's time in Russia short, as he opted to return to Czechia, re-signing with his former team, HC Sparta Praha, for the remainder of the 2021–22 Czech Extraliga season. He continued to play for Praha during the 2022–23 season, in which Tomášek scored 37 points in 47 games.

On 30 May 2023, Tomášek signed a one-year contract to play for Färjestad BK of the Swedish Hockey League (SHL), for the 2023–24 SHL season, thus marking his debut playing in Sweden. Tomášek's season in Sweden got off to an excellent start, as he signed a contract extension on 2 November, keeping him with the team for another year. Tomášek completed his first year in the SHL with 45 points in 52 games and won the Håkan Loob Trophy, awarded to the league's top goalscorer. Tomášek's second year in Sweden saw him achieve even greater success offensively, as he finished the 2024–25 season as the SHL's overall top pointscorer and won the Guldhjälmen (Golden Helmet) Award, given to the league's most valuable player.

==== NHL ====
On 2 April 2025, Tomášek signed a one-year contract to join the Edmonton Oilers of the National Hockey League (NHL) for their upcoming 2025–26 NHL season. This marked a return to playing hockey in Canada for Tomášek, where he had previously played for the Belleville Bulls during his junior career days.

Tomášek made his NHL debut as a 29-year-old for the Oilers on 8 October 2025, in their season-opening game. He registered his first NHL point that same night, by assisting on fellow forward Leon Draisaitl's 400th career NHL goal in a 4–3 shootout loss to Battle of Alberta rivals, the Calgary Flames. Fifteen days later, Tomášek would score his first NHL goal as a member of the Oilers on 23 October, against Montreal Canadiens goaltender Samuel Montembeault, in a 6–5 victory.

After only a few months with the team, Tomášek's time in the NHL with Edmonton and his return to North America would come to an abrupt end, as the Oilers announced that Tomášek's contract was to be terminated via mutual consent on 26 December. Once the NHL's holiday roster freeze was lifted, Tomášek was placed on waivers for the purpose of contract termination on 28 December. His abbreviated tenure with the Oilers ended the following day, with Tomášek recording 5 points in a total of 22 games played at the NHL level.

==== Return to Europe ====
Upon the cancellation of his contract with the Edmonton Oilers, Tomášek returned to his former team, Färjestad BK, signing a contract on 29 December 2025, which ran for the remainder of the 2025–26 SHL season. Tomášek completed his second stint with Färjestad by recording 19 points in 19 games.

Upon the conclusion of the SHL season, it was announced on 12 May 2026, that Tomášek had signed a five-year contract to return to Czechia and play for HC Dynamo Pardubice, his first professional team, for the 2026–27 Czech Extraliga season.

== International play ==
Medal record

Men's ice hockey

Representing the Czech Republic

World Championships
Gold medal – first place	2024 Czechia	

Tomášek has represented Czechia at the 2023 IIHF World Championship and won a gold medal the following year, at the 2024 IIHF World Championship. He represented his country again at the 2026 IIHF World Championship.

On 6 January 2026, it was announced that Tomášek was named to the roster of Czechia for the 2026 Winter Olympics. The Czechs were eliminated during the quarterfinals game against Canada.

== Personal life ==
Tomášek married his wife, Adéla Kocourková, on 29 June 2024. They became parents to a daughter, Naše Aurélie, born on 6 July 2026.

== Career statistics ==
=== Regular season and playoffs ===
			Regular season					Playoffs
Season	Team	League	GP	G	A	Pts	PIM	GP	G	A	Pts	PIM
2011–12	Oakland Jr. Grizzlies	T1EHL U16	39	13	13	26	12	—	—	—	—	—
2012–13	Oakland Jr. Grizzlies	T1EHL U16	39	29	19	48	22	—	—	—	—	—
2012–13	Oakland Jr. Grizzlies	T1EHL U18	1	0	1	1	0	—	—	—	—	—
2013–14	Belleville Bulls	OHL	58	13	14	27	8	—	—	—	—	—
2014–15	Belleville Bulls	OHL	61	13	18	31	16	—	—	—	—	—
2015–16	HC Dynamo Pardubice U20	Czech.20	1	1	1	2	0	—	—	—	—	—
2015–16	Draci Šumperk	CZE1	4	2	3	5	2	—	—	—	—	—
2015–16	HC Dynamo Pardubice	ELH	40	6	6	12	24	6	1	0	1	0
2016–17	HC Dynamo Pardubice	ELH	47	14	7	21	42	18	6	7	13	6
2017–18	HC Dynamo Pardubice	ELH	47	11	16	27	16	7	2	1	3	18
2018–19	JYP	Liiga	56	11	22	33	36	2	1	0	1	2
2019–20	JYP	Liiga	7	1	5	6	0	—	—	—	—	—
2019–20	HC Sparta Praha	ELH	38	9	15	24	22	—	—	—	—	—
2020–21	HC Sparta Praha	ELH	50	19	28	47	18	11	4	1	5	6
2021–22	Amur Khabarovsk	KHL	47	9	12	21	32	—	—	—	—	—
2021–22	HC Sparta Praha	ELH	7	4	7	11	0	10	6	7	13	6
2022–23	HC Sparta Praha	ELH	47	15	22	37	36	6	1	1	2	2
2023–24	Färjestad BK	SHL	52	25	20	45	20	4	1	0	1	2
2024–25	Färjestad BK	SHL	47	24	33	57	43	6	0	2	2	8
2025–26	Edmonton Oilers	NHL	22	3	2	5	10	—	—	—	—	—
2025–26	Färjestad BK	SHL	19	8	11	19	10	7	5	0	5	2
ELH totals			276	78	101	179	158	46	16	11	27	34
Liiga totals			63	12	27	39	36	2	1	0	1	2
KHL totals			47	9	12	21	32	—	—	—	—	—
SHL totals			118	57	64	121	73	17	6	2	8	12
NHL totals			22	3	2	5	10	—	—	—	—	—

=== International ===
Year	Team	Event	Result	GP	G	A	Pts	PIM
2016	Czech Republic	WJC	5th	4	0	0	0	0
2023	Czechia	WC	8th	7	0	4	4	0
2024	Czechia	WC	1st place, gold medalist(s)	10	1	3	4	0
2026	Czechia	OG	8th	4	0	0	0	0
2026	Czechia	WC	5th	8	0	5	5	6
Junior totals				4	0	0	0	0
Senior totals				29	1	12	13	6

== Awards and honours ==
Award	Year	Ref
SHL
Håkan Loob Trophy	2023–24	
Most assists	2024–25	
Most points	2024–25	
Guldhjälmen Most Valuable Player	2024–25	
