= Eemil Erholtz =

Finnish ice hockey player

- Born: March 25, 2000 (age 26) Mikkeli, Finland
- Height: 5 ft 11 in (180 cm)
- Weight: 183 lb (83 kg; 13 st 1 lb)
- Position: Winger
- Shoots: Right
- Liiga team Former teams: Oulun Kärpät; Vaasan Sport; SaiPa; Porin Ässät
- National team: Finland
- Playing career: 2018–present

Eemil Erholtz (born 25 March 2000) is a Finnish professional ice hockey player who is a winger for Oulun Kärpät of the Liiga.

== Playing career ==
In 2021, Erholtz left Vaasan Sport and signed an initial two-year contract with fellow Liiga outfit, Porin Ässät.

Medal record

Men's ice hockey

Representing Finland

World Championships
Gold medal – first place	2026 Switzerland	
