= Marcus Sylvegård =

Swedish ice hockey player

- Born: 4 May 1999 (age 26) Gessie, Sweden
- Height: 183 cm (6 ft 0 in)
- Weight: 86 kg (190 lb; 13 st 8 lb)
- Position: Right wing
- Shoots: Right
- NL team Former teams: EHC Biel; Malmö Redhawks; Växjö Lakers
- NHL draft: Undrafted
- Playing career: 2016–present

Marcus Sylvegård (born 4 May 1999) is a Swedish professional ice hockey forward who is currently playing with the EHC Biel-Bienne of the National League (NL).

== Playing career ==
Undrafted, Sylvegård played as a youth within the Malmö Redhawks organization. He made his Swedish Hockey League (SHL) with the Redhawks in the 2015–16 season and has also played with the Växjö Lakers.

Sylvegård was part of the winning Växjö Lakers side of the 2020–21 SHL campaign.

Following his second stint with the Lakers, matching his previous career high with 41 points through 51 regular season games in the 2023–24 season, Sylvegård, as an undrafted free agent, was signed to a one-year, entry-level contract with the St. Louis Blues of the National Hockey League (NHL) on 30 April 2024.

After attending the Blues training camp, Sylvegård was assigned to AHL affiliate, the Springfield Thunderbirds, to begin the 2024–25 season. In his first in North America, Sylvegård quickly transitioned to the smaller rink and North American style and was among the team leaders in scoring with 10 goals and 21 points through 35 appearances. Unable to earn a call up to the NHL, on 29 January 2025, Sylvegård opted to mutually terminate the remainder of his contract with the St. Louis Blues. As a free agent, Sylvegård immediately opted to return to Sweden and the SHL to reunite with former club, Växjö Lakers, for the remainder of the season on 30 January 2025.

On 8 April 2025, Sylvegård agreed to a two-year contract with Swiss club, EHC Biel-Bienne of the NL, beginning in the 2025–26 season.

== Career statistics ==
=== Regular season and playoffs ===
			Regular season					Playoffs
Season	Team	League	GP	G	A	Pts	PIM	GP	G	A	Pts	PIM
2014–15	Malmö Redhawks	J20	0	0	0	0	0	1	0	0	0	0
2015–16	Malmö Redhawks	J20	26	8	2	10	22	3	0	0	0	2
2015–16	Malmö Redhawks	SHL	1	0	0	0	0	—	—	—	—	—
2016–17	Malmö Redhawks	J20	37	15	13	28	69	2	0	0	0	0
2016–17	Malmö Redhawks	SHL	14	0	0	0	0	—	—	—	—	—
2016–17	IK Pantern	Allsv	3	2	1	3	0	—	—	—	—	—
2017–18	Malmö Redhawks	J20	2	1	3	4	2	—	—	—	—	—
2017–18	Malmö Redhawks	SHL	25	3	2	5	0	8	0	0	0	2
2017–18	IK Oskarshamn	Allsv	20	2	4	6	6	4	0	0	0	2
2017–18	IK Pantern	Allsv	1	0	2	2	0	—	—	—	—	—
2018–19	Malmö Redhawks	J20	6	4	10	14	6	2	2	3	5	2
2018–19	Malmö Redhawks	SHL	45	6	4	10	78	4	0	0	0	0
2019–20	Växjö Lakers	SHL	41	3	6	9	6	—	—	—	—	—
2019–20	Kristianstads IK	Allsv	8	1	0	1	6	—	—	—	—	—
2020–21	Växjö Lakers	SHL	47	5	11	16	41	14	4	6	10	2
2021–22	Malmö Redhawks	SHL	44	11	7	18	22	—	—	—	—	—
2022–23	Malmö Redhawks	SHL	52	17	24	41	61	—	—	—	—	—
2023–24	Växjö Lakers	SHL	51	23	18	41	10	8	0	3	3	0
2024–25	Springfield Thunderbirds	AHL	35	10	11	21	19	—	—	—	—	—
2024–25	Växjö Lakers	SHL	12	3	9	12	5	8	2	2	4	48
SHL totals			332	71	81	152	223	42	6	11	17	52

=== International ===
Year	Team	Event	Result	GP	G	A	Pts	PIM
2016	Sweden	IH18	4th	5	1	2	3	10
2017	Sweden	U18	4th	7	1	0	1	8
Junior totals				12	2	2	4	18
