= Daniel Voženílek =

Czech ice hockey player

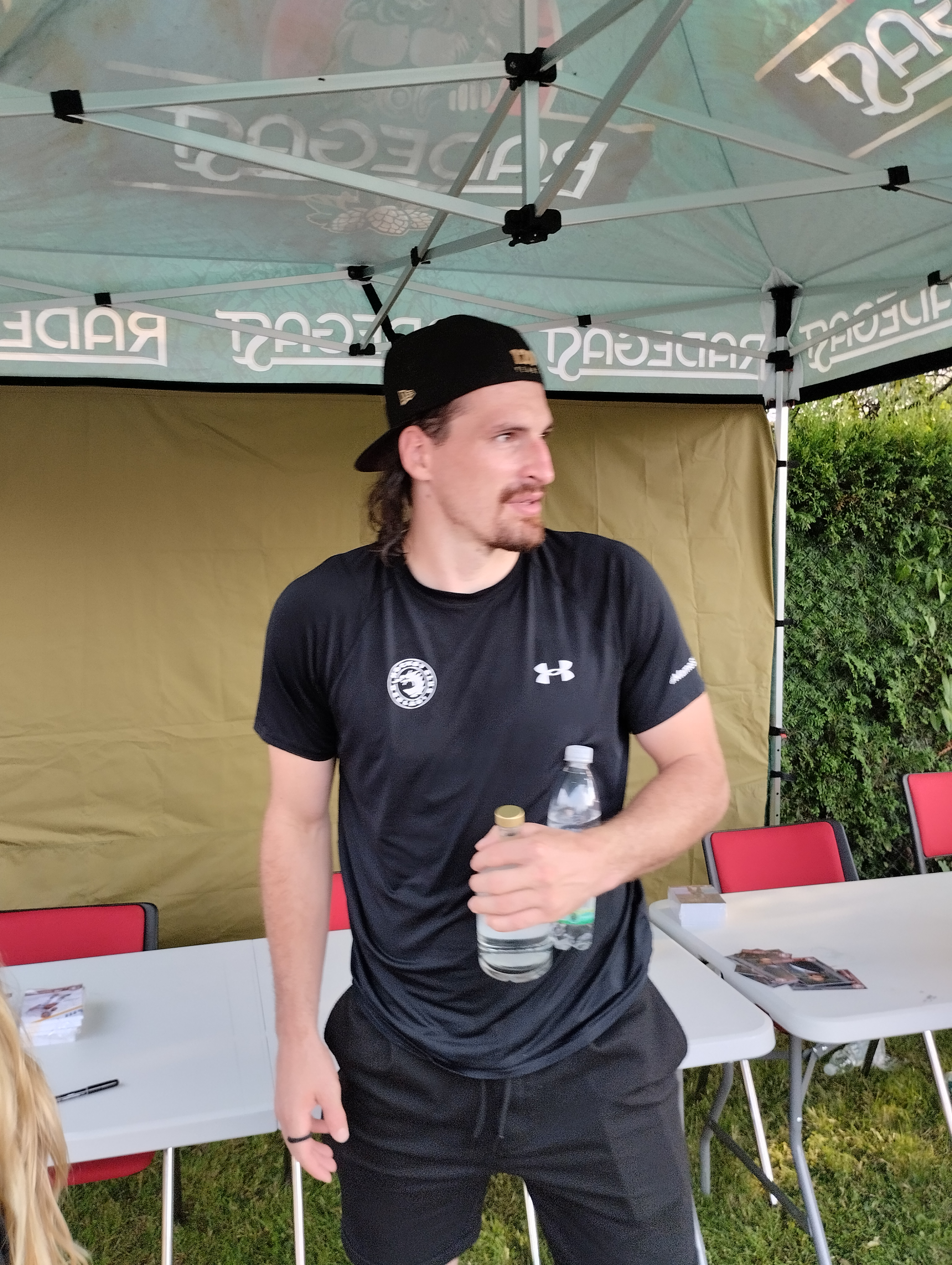
- Born: February 10, 1996 (age 30) Pardubice, Czech Republic
- Height: 6 ft 3 in (191 cm)
- Weight: 214 lb (97 kg; 15 st 4 lb)
- Position: Forward
- Shoots: Left
- ELH team Former teams: HC Oceláři Třinec; HC Dynamo Pardubice; HC Motor České Budějovice; HC Sparta Praha; EV Zug
- National team: Czech Republic
- Playing career: 2014–present

Daniel Voženílek (born February 10, 1996) is a Czech professional ice hockey player who is a forward for HC Oceláři Třinec of the Czech Extraliga (ELH).

== Career ==
Voženílek made his Czech Extraliga debut playing with HC Dynamo Pardubice during the 2013-14 Czech Extraliga season.

== International play ==
Medal record

Men's ice hockey

Representing the Czech Republic

World Championships
Gold medal – first place	2024 Czechia	

Voženílek represented Czechia at the 2024 IIHF World Championship and won a gold medal.

== Career statistics ==
=== International ===
Year	Team	Event	Result	GP	G	A	Pts	PIM
2015	Czech Republic	WJC	6th	2	0	0	0	0
2016	Czech Republic	WJC	5th	5	0	1	1	0
2023	Czechia	WC	8th	7	0	1	1	25
2024	Czechia	WC	1st place, gold medalist(s)	9	0	3	3	0
2025	Czechia	WC	6th	8	1	4	5	4
2026	Czechia	WC	5th	8	2	1	3	4
Junior totals				7	0	1	1	0
Senior totals				32	3	9	12	33
