= Veli-Matti Vittasmäki =

Finnish ice hockey player

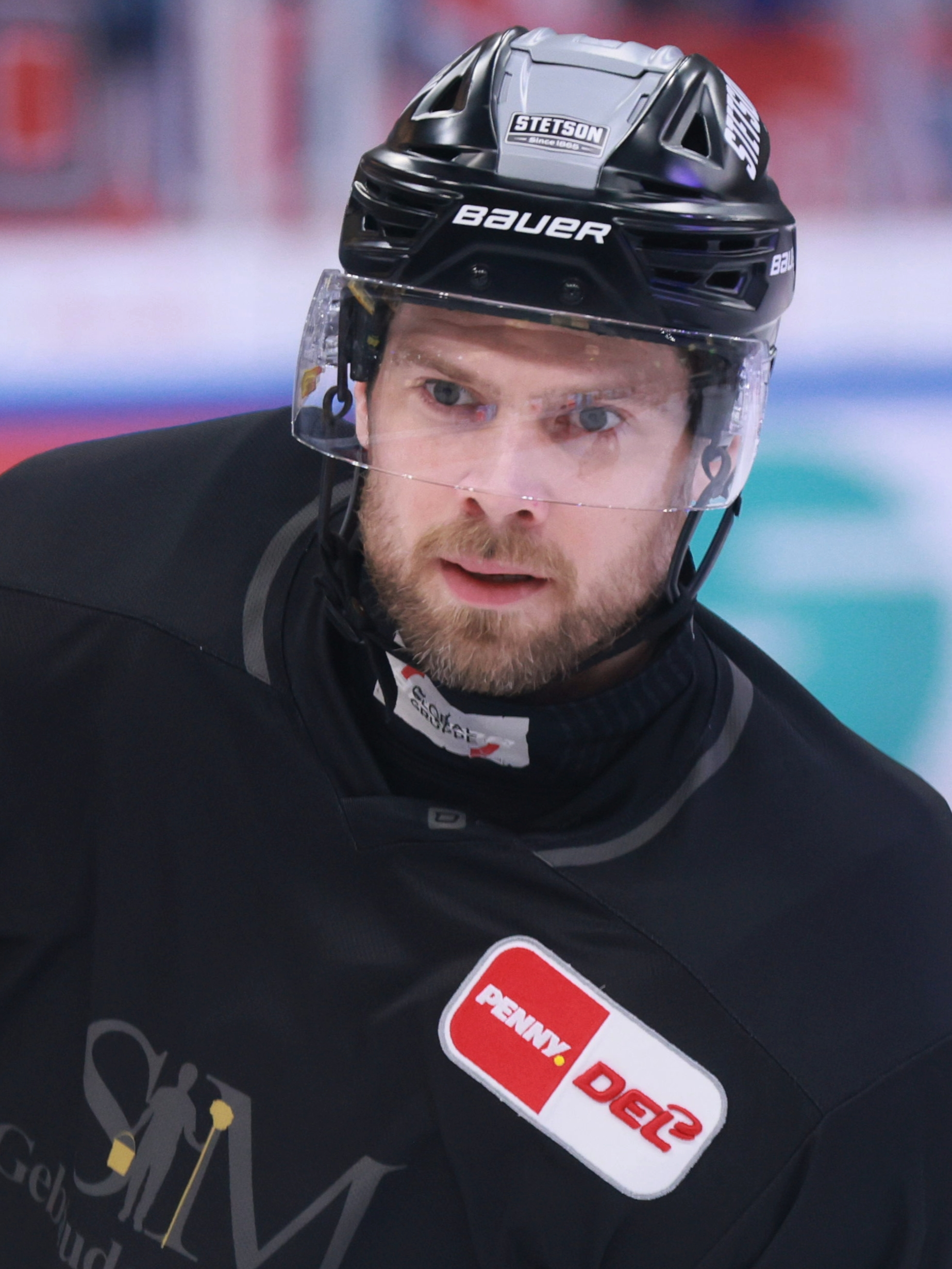
- Vittasmäki in 2025
- Born: July 3, 1990 (age 35) Turku, Finland
- Height: 6 ft 1 in (185 cm)
- Weight: 205 lb (93 kg; 14 st 9 lb)
- Position: Defence
- Shoots: Left
- Liiga team Former teams: Tappara; HC TPS; KalPa; Ilves; Severstal Cherepovets
- National team: Finland
- Playing career: 2008–present

Veli-Matti Vittasmäki (born July 3, 1990) is a Finnish professional ice hockey player who currently plays for Kölner Haie in the Penny DEL.

Vittasmäki joined Severstal Cherepovets after playing the previous three seasons with Tappara of the Finnish Liiga. He agreed to a one-year contract with the Russian club, leaving Finland for the first time in his 12-year professional career on 1 May 2020.

After a lone season in the KHL, Vittasmäki returned to former club, Tappara of the Liiga, agreeing to a three-year contract on 19 May 2021.
