= Victor Ejdsell =

Swedish professional ice hockey forward

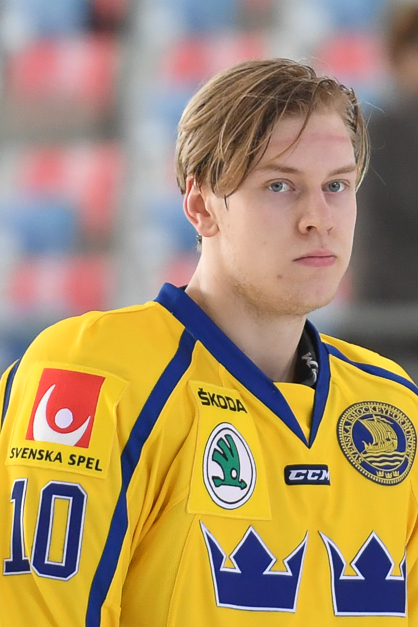
- Ejdsell with Sweden in 2017
- Born: 6 June 1995 (age 31) Karlstad, Sweden
- Height: 6 ft 5 in (196 cm)
- Weight: 214 lb (97 kg; 15 st 4 lb)
- Position: Forward
- Shoots: Left
- NL team Former teams: SC Bern; Färjestad BK; HV71; Chicago Blackhawks
- NHL draft: Undrafted
- Playing career: 2014–present

Victor Ejdsell (born 6 June 1995) is a Swedish professional ice hockey forward currently playing under contract for SC Bern in the National League (NL). Ejdsell has briefly played in the National Hockey League (NHL) with the Chicago Blackhawks.

== Playing career ==
Ejdsell played as a youth with Vikings HC in the lower Swedish divisions before joining the junior ranks of Färjestad BK. Undrafted, Ejdsell made his Swedish Hockey League debut playing with Färjestad BK during the 2014–15 SHL season.

After three seasons within Färjestad BK, and in need of an increased role, Ejdsell left the SHL in signing a one-year contract in the Allsvenskan with BIK Karlskoga on April 29, 2016. In the 2016–17 season, Ejdsell broke out offensively leading the club with 57 points in just 50 games to be amongst the league leaders.

On 5 May 2017, NBC Sports reported that Ejdsell signed an entry-level contract with the Nashville Predators of the NHL, after being pursued by several other NHL franchises such as the Detroit Red Wings and the Chicago Blackhawks. Before official confirmation, Ejdsell made clear his intentions to continue his development in Sweden by agreeing to a two-year contract with newly crowned champions, HV71 of the SHL on 10 May 2017. The Predators later revealed that Ejdsell signed a two-year, entry-level deal on 15 May 2017. On 26 February 2018, the Predators traded Ejdsell along with first-round and fourth-round picks in the 2018 NHL entry draft to the Chicago Blackhawks in exchange for Ryan Hartman and a fifth-round pick in 2018.

Upon completion of the 2017–18 season, having led HV71 with 20 goals and scoring 34 points in 50 games, Ejdsell was reassigned by the Blackhawks to join AHL affiliate, the Rockford IceHogs on 21 March 2018. He was recalled to the NHL a few days later on 25 March 2018. Ejdsell made his NHL debut the next day in a game against the San Jose Sharks. He recorded his first NHL assist on 29 March 2018 in a game against the Winnipeg Jets. He made 6 regular season appearances with the Blackhawks before he was returned to the IceHogs for their extended playoff run.

In the following 2018–19 season, Ejdsell continued to play with the Rockford IceHogs. Unable to earn a recall to the NHL, Ejdsell failed to make the desired impact with the IceHogs posting 12 goals and 29 points in 61 games. As an impending restricted free agent, Ejdsell opted to return to Sweden to continue his career, reuniting with original club on a two-year contract with Färjestad BK of the SHL, on May 9, 2019.

After five seasons with Färjestad BK, Ejdsell opted to move abroad in agreeing to a two-year contract with Swiss club, SC Bern of the NL, on 29 April 2024.

== Career statistics ==
| | | | Regular season | | | | | Playoffs |
| Season | Team | League | GP | G | A | Pts | PIM | GP | G | A | Pts | PIM |
|---|---|---|---|---|---|---|---|---|---|---|---|---|
| 2010–11 | Viking HC | Div.2 | 24 | 7 | 3 | 10 | 8 | — | — | — | — | — |
| 2011–12 | Viking HC | Div.3 | 16 | 28 | 22 | 50 | 8 | 3 | 2 | 4 | 6 | 2 |
| 2012–13 | Viking HC | Div.3 | 13 | 17 | 17 | 34 | 8 | — | — | — | — | — |
| 2012–13 | Sunne IK | Div.2 | 32 | 23 | 36 | 59 | 18 | 2 | 1 | 2 | 3 | 4 |
| 2013–14 | Färjestad BK | J20 | 37 | 17 | 11 | 28 | 36 | 6 | 2 | 2 | 4 | 2 |
| 2014–15 | Färjestad BK | J20 | 37 | 18 | 21 | 39 | 30 | 6 | 2 | 3 | 5 | 8 |
| 2014–15 | Färjestad BK | SHL | 12 | 1 | 0 | 1 | 0 | — | — | — | — | — |
| 2015–16 | Färjestad BK | J20 | 8 | 5 | 9 | 14 | 4 | — | — | — | — | — |
| 2015–16 | Färjestad BK | SHL | 9 | 1 | 0 | 1 | 0 | 2 | 0 | 0 | 0 | 0 |
| 2015–16 | Timrå IK | Allsv | 20 | 4 | 8 | 12 | 6 | 5 | 0 | 1 | 1 | 6 |
| 2016–17 | BIK Karlskoga | Allsv | 50 | 25 | 32 | 57 | 34 | 10 | 4 | 3 | 7 | 8 |
| 2017–18 | HV71 | SHL | 50 | 20 | 14 | 34 | 32 | 2 | 0 | 0 | 0 | 2 |
| 2017–18 | Rockford IceHogs | AHL | 5 | 0 | 1 | 1 | 0 | 13 | 7 | 5 | 12 | 2 |
| 2017–18 | Chicago Blackhawks | NHL | 6 | 0 | 1 | 1 | 2 | — | — | — | — | — |
| 2018–19 | Rockford IceHogs | AHL | 61 | 12 | 17 | 29 | 24 | — | — | — | — | — |
| 2019–20 | Färjestad BK | SHL | 45 | 17 | 14 | 31 | 20 | — | — | — | — | — |
| 2020–21 | Färjestad BK | SHL | 52 | 14 | 23 | 37 | 28 | 6 | 1 | 1 | 2 | 4 |
| 2021–22 | Färjestad BK | SHL | 48 | 8 | 9 | 17 | 45 | 19 | 8 | 6 | 14 | 16 |
| 2022–23 | Färjestad BK | SHL | 46 | 13 | 17 | 30 | 57 | 6 | 1 | 1 | 2 | 0 |
| 2023–24 | Färjestad BK | SHL | 50 | 20 | 21 | 41 | 49 | 4 | 0 | 1 | 1 | 2 |
| SHL totals | | | 312 | 94 | 98 | 192 | 231 | 39 | 10 | 9 | 19 | 24 |
| NHL totals | | | 6 | 0 | 1 | 1 | 2 | — | — | — | — | — |

== Awards and honours ==
| Award | Year |
HockeyAllsvenskan
| Forward of the Year | 2017 |
| MVP | 2017 |
SHL
| Le Mat Trophy (Färjestad BK) | 2022 |
