= Jesper Frödén =

Swedish ice hockey player (born 1994)

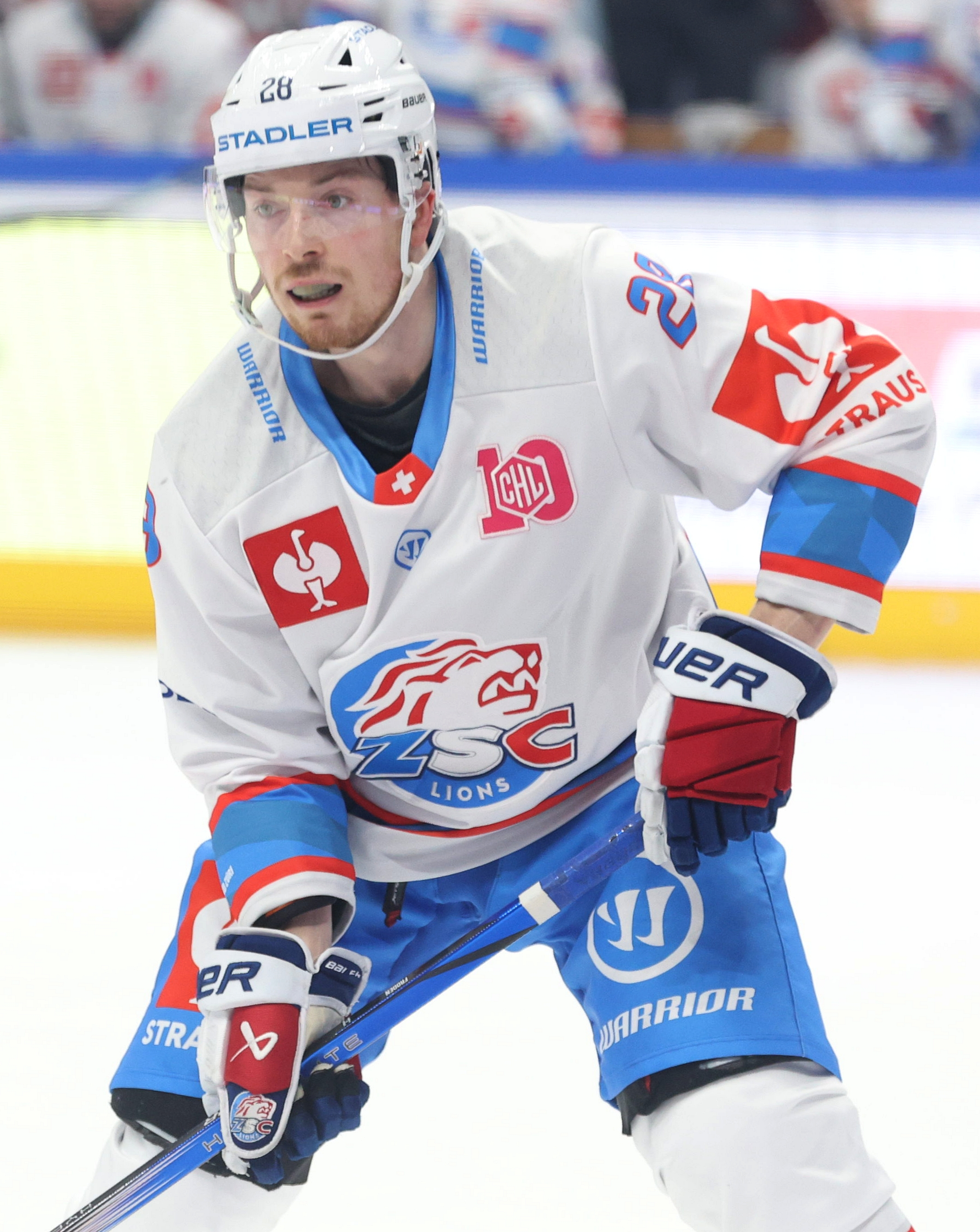
- Frödén with the ZSC Lions in 2024
- Born: 21 September 1994 (age 31) Stockholm, Sweden
- Height: 5 ft 10 in (178 cm)
- Weight: 176 lb (80 kg; 12 st 8 lb)
- Position: Right winger
- Shoots: Right
- NL team Former teams: ZSC Lions; Skellefteå AIK; Boston Bruins; Seattle Kraken
- National team: Sweden
- NHL draft: Undrafted
- Playing career: 2013–present

Jesper Frödén (Swedish: [ˈjɛ̌spɛr frœˈdeːn]; born 21 September 1994) is a Swedish professional ice hockey right winger for the ZSC Lions of the National League (NL).

== Playing career ==
Frödén was awarded Swedish Hockey League Rookie of the Year Award for his achievements during the 2019–20 season.

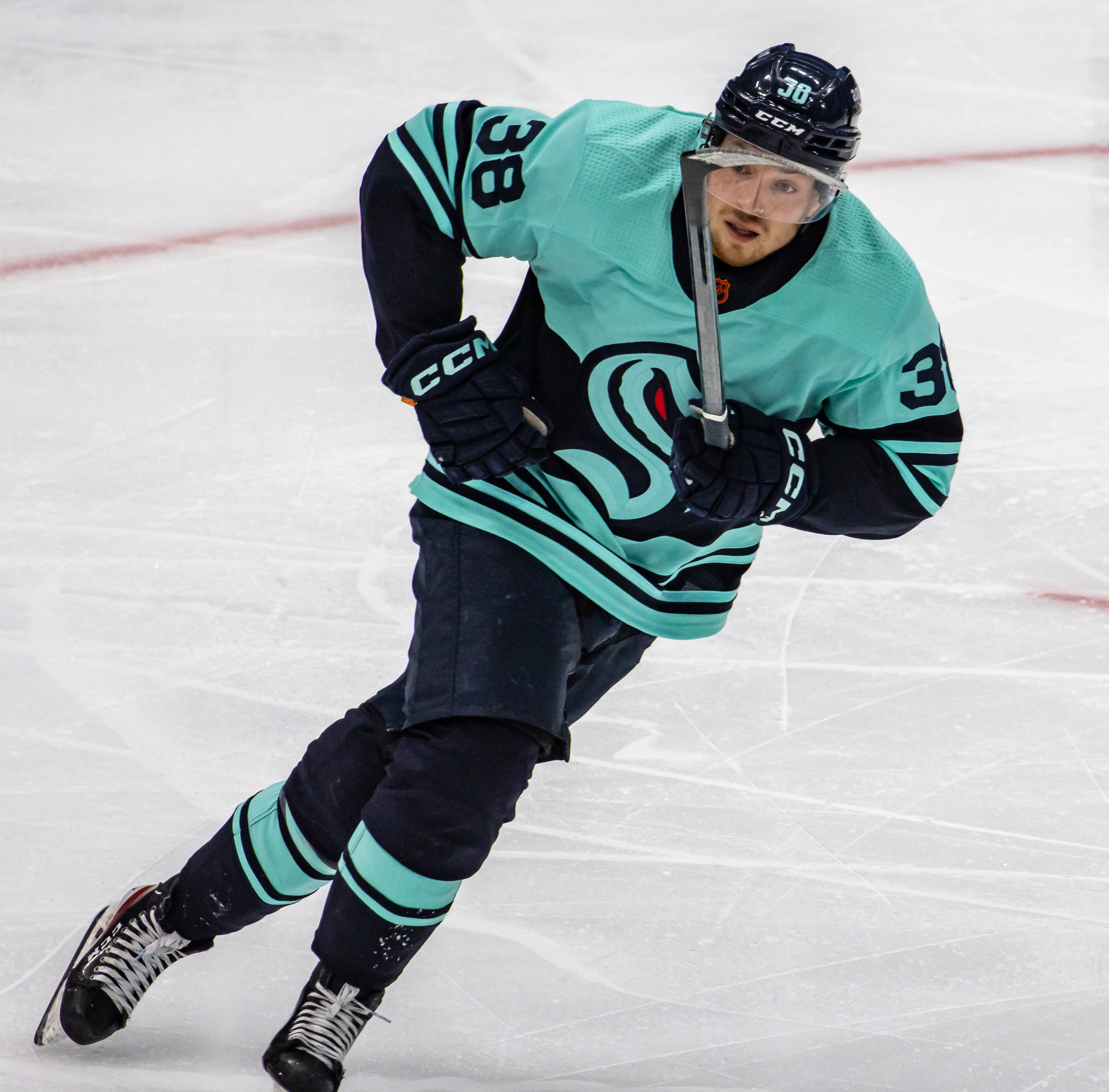
Frödén with the Seattle Kraken in 2023.

On 14 June 2021, Frödén was signed as an undrafted free agent to a one-year, two-way contract with the Boston Bruins of the NHL.

Leaving the Bruins as a free agent at the conclusion of his one-year tenure with the club, Frödén was signed to a one-year, two-way contract with the Seattle Kraken on 13 July 2022.

During the 2022–23 season, on 22 February 2023, Frödén was recalled to the Kraken from their AHL affiliate, the Coachella Valley Firebirds. He appeared in a career high 14 NHL games, recording 4 assists. He remained with the Kraken through their maiden post-season run, featuring in 1 playoff contest. He returned to the Firebirds for their inaugural playoff campaign and collected 5 goals and 10 points through 15 games in reaching the Calder Cup finals against the victorious Hershey Bears.

As a pending free agent from the Kraken, Frödén opted to return to Europe and signed a two-year contract with Swiss club, ZSC Lions of the NL, on 24 June 2023.

== International play ==
Medal record

Representing Sweden

Ice hockey

World Championships
Bronze medal – third place	2024 Czech Republic	
Bronze medal – third place	2025 Sweden/Denmark	

Frödén represented Sweden at the 2024 IIHF World Championship and won a bronze medal.

== Career statistics ==
=== Regular season and playoffs ===
			Regular season					Playoffs
Season	Team	League	GP	G	A	Pts	PIM	GP	G	A	Pts	PIM
2010–11	Huddinge IK	J20	9	2	1	3	0	—	—	—	—	—
2011–12	Huddinge IK	J20	44	15	17	32	28	—	—	—	—	—
2012–13	Södertälje SK	J20	30	10	18	28	22	3	1	1	2	2
2012–13	Södertälje SK	Allsv	8	1	1	2	0	2	0	0	0	0
2013–14	Södertälje SK	J20	7	1	3	4	0	4	3	1	4	2
2013–14	Södertälje SK	Allsv	31	9	6	15	10	—	—	—	—	—
2014–15	Södertälje SK	Allsv	49	11	13	24	12	—	—	—	—	—
2015–16	AIK	Allsv	48	16	16	32	14	10	2	1	3	4
2016–17	AIK	Allsv	51	15	11	26	16	8	1	2	3	2
2017–18	AIK	Allsv	52	17	18	35	38	5	3	1	4	2
2018–19	AIK	Allsv	50	19	19	38	30	7	4	3	7	27
2019–20	Skellefteå AIK	SHL	49	12	17	29	18	—	—	—	—	—
2020–21	Skellefteå AIK	SHL	52	22	18	40	49	12	3	1	4	14
2021–22	Providence Bruins	AHL	49	16	18	34	26	—	—	—	—	—
2021–22	Boston Bruins	NHL	7	1	0	1	2	—	—	—	—	—
2022–23	Coachella Valley Firebirds	AHL	44	25	22	47	24	15	5	5	10	8
2022–23	Seattle Kraken	NHL	14	0	4	4	6	1	0	0	0	0
2023–24	ZSC Lions	NL	47	22	18	40	18	15	2	4	6	10
2024–25	ZSC Lions	NL	45	16	25	41	16	16	3	5	8	12
SHL totals			101	34	35	69	67	12	3	1	4	14
NHL totals			21	1	4	5	8	1	0	0	0	0
NL totals			92	38	43	81	34	31	5	9	14	22

=== International ===
Year	Team	Event	Result	GP	G	A	Pts	PIM
2021	Sweden	WC	9th	5	3	1	4	4
2024	Sweden	WC	3rd place, bronze medalist(s)	9	0	3	3	6
2025	Sweden	WC	3rd place, bronze medalist(s)	10	0	2	2	2
Senior totals				24	3	6	9	12

== Awards and honors ==
Award	Year
SHL
Rookie of the Year	2020
NL
Champion (ZSC Lions)	2024

Awards and achievements
Preceded by Emil Bemström	Winner of the SHL Rookie of the Year award 2020	Succeeded by William Eklund
