= Marcus Sörensen =

Swedish ice hockey player (born 1992)

- Born: 7 April 1992 (age 34) Södertälje, Sweden
- Height: 5 ft 11 in (180 cm)
- Weight: 175 lb (79 kg; 12 st 7 lb)
- Position: Right wing
- Shoots: Left
- NL team Former teams: HC Fribourg-Gottéron; Djurgårdens IF; Skellefteå AIK; San Jose Sharks
- National team: Sweden
- NHL draft: 106th overall, 2010; Ottawa Senators
- Playing career: 2010–present

Marcus Sörensen (born 7 April 1992) is a Swedish professional ice hockey forward for HC Fribourg-Gottéron of the National League (NL).

== Playing career ==
Sörensen began playing hockey in Tälje IK before he was acquired by Södertälje SK's youth organization, where he began playing junior hockey. His play attracted the attention of North American pro hockey scouts. Sörensen was drafted in the fourth round of the 2010 NHL entry draft by Ottawa Senators, 106th overall.

Sörensen moved to Djurgårdens IF for the 2010–11 season, to play in Djurgården's J20-team. Sörensen made his Elitserien debut on 7 December 2010 against Luleå HF, when several regular players were suffering from illness and injuries. He also scored his first Elitserien goal when he shot the puck via Luleå defenceman Janne Niinimaa's stick into the goal. After the 2010–11 season, Sörensen signed a two-year contract with Skellefteå AIK. Sörensen played the majority of the 2011–12 season with Borås HC in the Swedish tier two league HockeyAllsvenskan, on loan.

The Ottawa Senators did not sign Sörensen by 1 June 2012 deadline, leaving him free to sign with any NHL team in the future. Sörensen returned to Djurgårdens IF for the 2012–13 season in early May 2012, signing a one-year contract. The 2012–13 season ended with a failed Swedish Hockey League (SHL) qualification for Djurgården, despite Sörensen's 10 goals and 23 points during the regular season. Sörensen extended his contract with Djurgårdens IF for two years in February 2013. The 2014 Kvalserien ended with the promotion of Djurgården to the 2014–15 season. Sörensen played a major role in the promotion, scoring 4 goals and 12 points in the Kvalserien which made him the scoring leader for Djurgården. He extended his contract yet again in September 2014, enabling him to play in Djurgården until the end of the 2017–18 season.

During the 2014–15 season, Sörensen recorded 17 goals and 15 assists in 50 games and after the end of the season he was awarded with the SHL Rookie of the Year award. In 2015–16, he made 47 appearances in the SHL regular season, scoring 15 goals and 19 assists to go along with one goal and five assists in playoff play (eight games).

On 13 May 2016, Sörensen was signed by the NHL's San Jose Sharks to an entry-level contract. As a result, Sörensen moved to North America for the 2016–17 season, beginning the season with the San Jose Barracuda, the Sharks' American Hockey League (AHL) affiliate. After registering 27 points (13 goals and 14 assists) and a +15 plus-minus rating in 39 games with the Barracuda, Sörensen was recalled by the Sharks for the first time in his career on 6 February 2017. He recorded his first NHL point with the primary assist on a Melker Karlsson goal in the second period of his first NHL game the next night, a 5–4 overtime loss to the Buffalo Sabres. On 2 March, in a game against the Vancouver Canucks, he scored his first NHL goal. On 18 April, in San Jose's first-round series against the Edmonton Oilers in the 2017 playoffs, he scored his first Stanley Cup playoff goal.

On 18 July 2017, Sörensen signed a two-year contract extension with the Sharks. On 15 January 2019, Sörensen signed another two-year contract extension.

On 29 September 2020, remaining in his native Sweden due to the COVID-19 pandemic, Sörensen was loaned by the Sharks to Swedish Allsvenskan club, HC Vita Hästen, until the commencement of the delayed 2020–21 NHL season. During his stint with Vita Hästen, Sörensen led the club and was among league leaders in scoring with 11 goals and 24 points in just 14 appearances. Sörensen returned to Djurgården in September 2021 when he signed on for the Stockholm-based club on a four-year contract.

As captain of Djurgården in the 2021–22 season, Sörensen led the team in scoring with 20 goals and 24 assists for 44 points through 47 games. Despite a strong individual season, he was unable to prevent Djurgården from relegation to the HockeyAllsvenskan, losing in a play out series to Timrå IK. During the end stages of the regular season with Djurgården, Sörensen opted to leave the club and move to Switzerland for the remaining three-year of his contract commencing from the 2022–23 season with HC Fribourg-Gottéron of the NL on 22 February 2022.

== International play ==
Medal record

Representing Sweden

Ice hockey

World Championships
Bronze medal – third place	2024 Czech Republic	

Marcus Sörensen earned selection with his first senior international game with Team Sweden in February 2015.

== Personal life ==
Sörensen is of Finnish descent through his father.

== Career statistics ==
=== Regular season and playoffs ===
			Regular season					Playoffs
Season	Team	League	GP	G	A	Pts	PIM	GP	G	A	Pts	PIM
2009–10	Södertälje SK	J20	27	7	10	17	54	—	—	—	—	—
2010–11	Djurgårdens IF	J20	31	14	22	36	53	4	3	0	3	2
2010–11	Djurgårdens IF	SEL	8	1	1	2	0	—	—	—	—	—
2011–12	Skellefteå AIK	SEL	1	0	0	0	0	—	—	—	—	—
2011–12	Borås HC	Allsv	29	8	9	17	55	—	—	—	—	—
2012–13	Djurgårdens IF	Allsv	46	10	13	23	38	6	4	1	5	2
2013–14	Djurgårdens IF	Allsv	43	13	17	30	34	10	4	8	12	4
2014–15	Djurgårdens IF	SHL	50	17	15	32	30	2	1	0	1	0
2015–16	Djurgårdens IF	SHL	47	15	19	34	34	8	1	5	6	14
2016–17	San Jose Barracuda	AHL	43	17	17	34	23	10	0	1	1	10
2016–17	San Jose Sharks	NHL	19	1	3	4	4	6	1	1	2	0
2017–18	San Jose Barracuda	AHL	23	7	11	18	14	—	—	—	—	—
2017–18	San Jose Sharks	NHL	32	5	2	7	5	10	4	1	5	2
2018–19	San Jose Sharks	NHL	80	17	13	30	23	18	0	5	5	2
2019–20	San Jose Sharks	NHL	66	7	11	18	26	—	—	—	—	—
2020–21	HC Vita Hästen	Allsv	14	11	13	24	8	—	—	—	—	—
2020–21	San Jose Sharks	NHL	29	1	4	5	16	—	—	—	—	—
2021–22	Djurgårdens IF	SHL	47	20	24	44	72	—	—	—	—	—
2022–23	HC Fribourg-Gottéron	NL	35	15	16	31	22	2	0	0	0	4
2023–24	HC Fribourg-Gottéron	NL	52	31	32	63	30	11	4	8	12	4
SHL totals			153	53	59	112	136	10	2	5	7	14
NHL totals			226	31	33	64	74	34	5	7	12	4

=== International ===
Year	Team	Event	Result	GP	G	A	Pts	PIM
2021	Sweden	WC	9th	7	2	2	4	0
2023	Sweden	WC	6th	8	1	1	2	4
2024	Sweden	WC	3rd place, bronze medalist(s)	8	0	0	0	2
Senior totals				23	3	3	6	6

Awards and achievements
Preceded by Andreas Johnsson	Winner of the SHL Rookie of the Year award 2015	Succeeded by Ludvig Rensfeldt
