= Eemeli Suomi =

Finnish ice hockey player

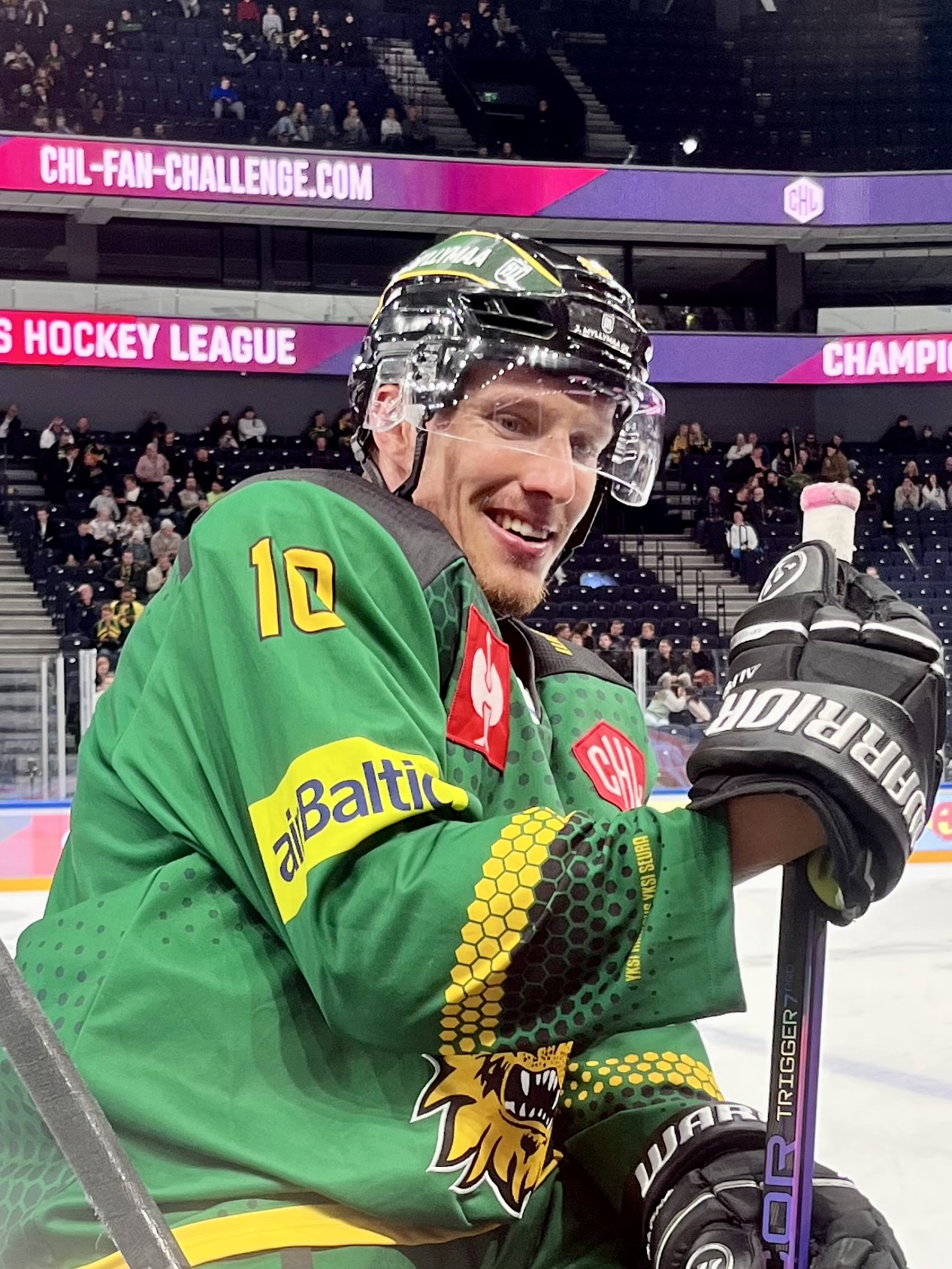
- Born: 4 December 1995 (age 30) Tampere, Finland
- Height: 5 ft 10 in (178 cm)
- Weight: 183 lb (83 kg; 13 st 1 lb)
- Position: Forward
- Shoots: Left
- SHL team Former teams: Växjö Lakers; Ilves
- Playing career: 2015–present

Eemeli Suomi (born 4 December 1995) is a Finnish professional ice hockey forward currently playing for Växjö Lakers of the Swedish Hockey League (SHL)

== Playing career ==
Suomi played as a youth within Ilves, before developing to make his professional debut with the club in the Finnish Liiga. In the 2019–20 season, Suomi's 26 goals scored tied for third in Liiga with Lauri Pajuniemi, behind just Julius Nättinen and Justin Danforth.

Suomi played 10 seasons in the Liiga with Ilves, combining for 395 points in 525 career games. During his tenure at Ilves, he held leadership roles as assistant captain and captain for 7 seasons.

As a free agent following the 2024–25 season, Suomi opted to leave Ilves and move to the Swedish Hockey League in securing a three-year contract with the Växjö Lakers on 4 May 2025.
