= Joren van Pottelberghe =

Swiss ice hockey player (born 1997)

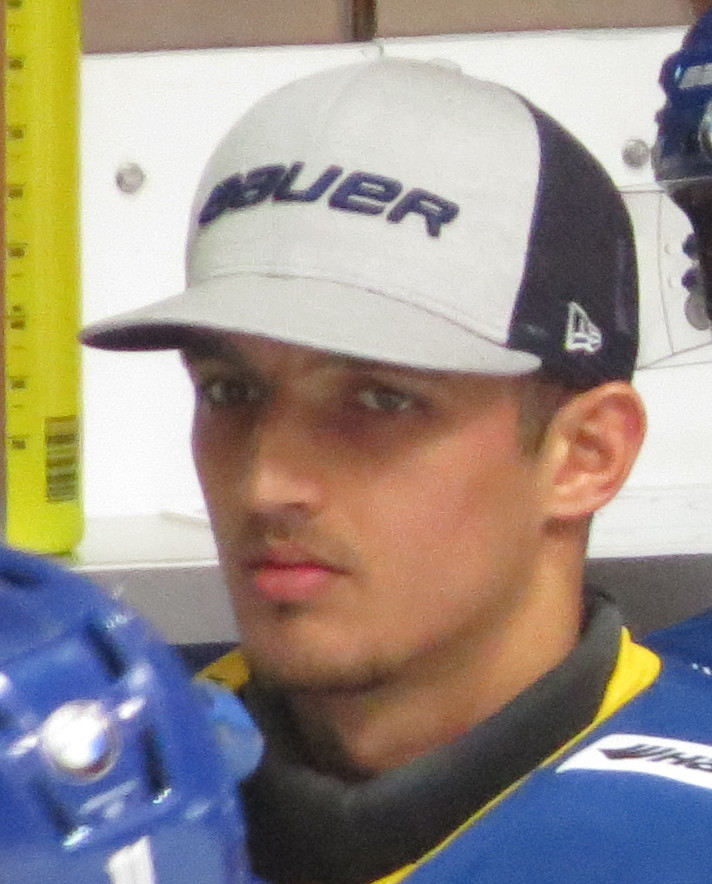
- Born: 5 June 1997 (age 29) Zug, Switzerland
- Height: 6 ft 3 in (191 cm)
- Weight: 187 lb (85 kg; 13 st 5 lb)
- Position: Goaltender
- Shoots: Left
- NL team Former teams: EHC Biel; HC Davos
- National team: Switzerland
- NHL draft: 110th overall, 2015; Detroit Red Wings
- Playing career: 2016–present

Joren van Pottelberghe (born 5 June 1997) is a Swiss professional ice hockey goaltender for EHC Biel of the National League (NL). He previously played for HC Davos.

== Playing career ==
van Pottelberghe was drafted 110th overall by the Detroit Red Wings in the 2015 NHL entry draft. He became the first Swiss player ever drafted by the Red Wings. He made his professional debut for HC Davos during the 2016–17 season where he posted a 2.62 goals against average (GAA) and .906 save percentage in 17 games.

On 8 January 2020, he signed a two-year contract with EHC Biel of the NL. On 30 August 2021, he signed a two-year contract extension with EHC Biel.

== International play ==
van Pottelberghe represented Switzerland at the 2015 IIHF World U18 Championships. He represented Switzerland at the 2016 World Junior Ice Hockey Championships where he posted a 2–3 record, with a 3.15 GAA and .887 save percentage in six games. He again represented Switzerland at the 2017 World Junior Ice Hockey Championships where he posted a 1–3 record, with a 3.16 GAA and .909 save percentage in five games.

On 18 January 2022, he was named to Team Switzerland men's national ice hockey team's roster for the 2022 Winter Olympics. He is the youngest player on the roster for Switzerland. However, after being diagnosed with COVID-19, he was excluded from the national team along with Sven Senteler.

== Career statistics ==
=== Regular season and playoffs ===
			Regular season									Playoffs
Season	Team	League	GP	W	L	T/OT	MIN	GA	SO	GAA	SV%	GP	W	L	MIN	GA	SO	GAA	SV%
2014–15	Linköping HC	J20	5	4	1	0	312	16	0	3.08	.892	—	—	—	—	—	—	—	—
2015–16	Linköping HC	J20	19	11	8	0	1,119	49	0	2.63	.896	—	—	—	—	—	—	—	—
2016–17	HC Davos	NL	17	—	—	—	1,006	44	0	2.62	.906	—	—	—	—	—	—	—	—
2017–18	HC Davos	NL	24	—	—	—	1,278	64	0	3.00	.905	—	—	—	—	—	—	—	—
2018–19	EHC Kloten	SL	24	—	—	—	1,442	55	0	2.29	.921	2	—	—	—	—	0	1.87	.925
2019–20	HC Davos	NL	25	12	8	2	1,445	63	1	2.62	.916	—	—	—	—	—	—	—	—
2020–21	EHC Biel	NL	40	22	11	4	2,366	98	2	2.49	.914	2	0	1	—	—	0	1.77	.925
2021–22	EHC Biel	NL	44	24	12	3	2,534	94	5	2.23	.921	—	—	—	—	—	—	—	—
NL totals			150	58	31	9	8,629	363	8	2.43	.916	2	0	1	—	—	0	1.77	.925

=== International ===
Year	Team	Event	Result	GP	W	L	T/OTL	MIN	GA	SO	GAA	SV%
2015	Switzerland	U18	4th	7	2	5	0	424	24	1	3.39	.881
2016	Switzerland	WJC	9th	6	2	3	0	285	15	0	3.15	.887
2017	Switzerland	WJC	7th	5	1	3	0	304	16	0	3.16	.909
Junior totals				18	5	11	0	1,013	55	1	3.23	.892
