= Arttu Hyry =

Finnish ice hockey player (born 2001)

- Born: 6 April 2001 (age 25) Oulu, North Ostrobothnia, Finland
- Height: 6 ft 3 in (191 cm)
- Weight: 214 lb (97 kg; 15 st 4 lb)
- Position: Center
- Shoots: Right
- NHL team Former teams: Dallas Stars; Oulun Kärpät
- National team: Finland
- NHL draft: Undrafted
- Playing career: 2020–present

Arttu Hyry (born 6 April 2001) is a Finnish professional ice hockey forward for the Dallas Stars of the National Hockey League (NHL).

== Playing career ==
Hyry played as a youth within topflight hometown club, Oulun Kärpät of the Liiga. Undrafted and following four seasons with Kärpät in the Liiga, Hyry was signed as a free agent to a two-year, entry-level contract with the Dallas Stars of the NHL on 16 April 2024.

In his debut season in North America, Hyry was assigned to begin the 2024–25 season campaign with Dallas' AHL affiliate the Texas Stars. Nearing a point-per-game output with Texas, Hyry was later recalled and made his NHL debut on 2 January 2025 with the Dallas Stars in a regular season game against the Ottawa Senators.

== Career statistics ==
=== Regular season and playoffs ===
			Regular season					Playoffs
Season	Team	League	GP	G	A	Pts	PIM	GP	G	A	Pts	PIM
2019–20	Oulun Kärpät	Jr. A	48	12	6	18	4	1	0	0	0	2
2020–21	Oulun Kärpät	Jr. A	36	10	10	20	2	5	1	0	1	0
2020–21	Oulun Kärpät	Liiga	3	0	0	0	0	1	0	0	0	0
2021–22	Oulun Kärpät	Liiga	43	4	5	9	4	7	2	0	2	0
2021–22	Hermes	Mestis	68	8	27	35	12	27	6	20	26	2
2022–23	Oulun Kärpät	Liiga	46	9	4	13	8	3	0	0	0	0
2023–24	Oulun Kärpät	Liiga	55	14	17	31	6	12	3	0	3	0
2024–25	Texas Stars	AHL	67	24	25	49	12	14	1	5	6	6
2024–25	Dallas Stars	NHL	5	0	1	1	0	—	—	—	—	—
2025–26	Texas Stars	AHL	27	9	10	19	13	—	—	—	—	—
2025–26	Dallas Stars	NHL	20	3	2	5	2	4	0	0	0	0
Liiga totals			147	27	26	53	18	23	5	0	5	0
NHL totals			25	3	3	6	2	4	0	0	0	0

=== International ===
Year	Team	Event	Result	GP	G	A	Pts	PIM
2024	Finland	WC	8th	8	2	1	3	2
Senior totals				8	2	1	3	2
