= Linus Johansson =

Swedish ice hockey player (born 1992)

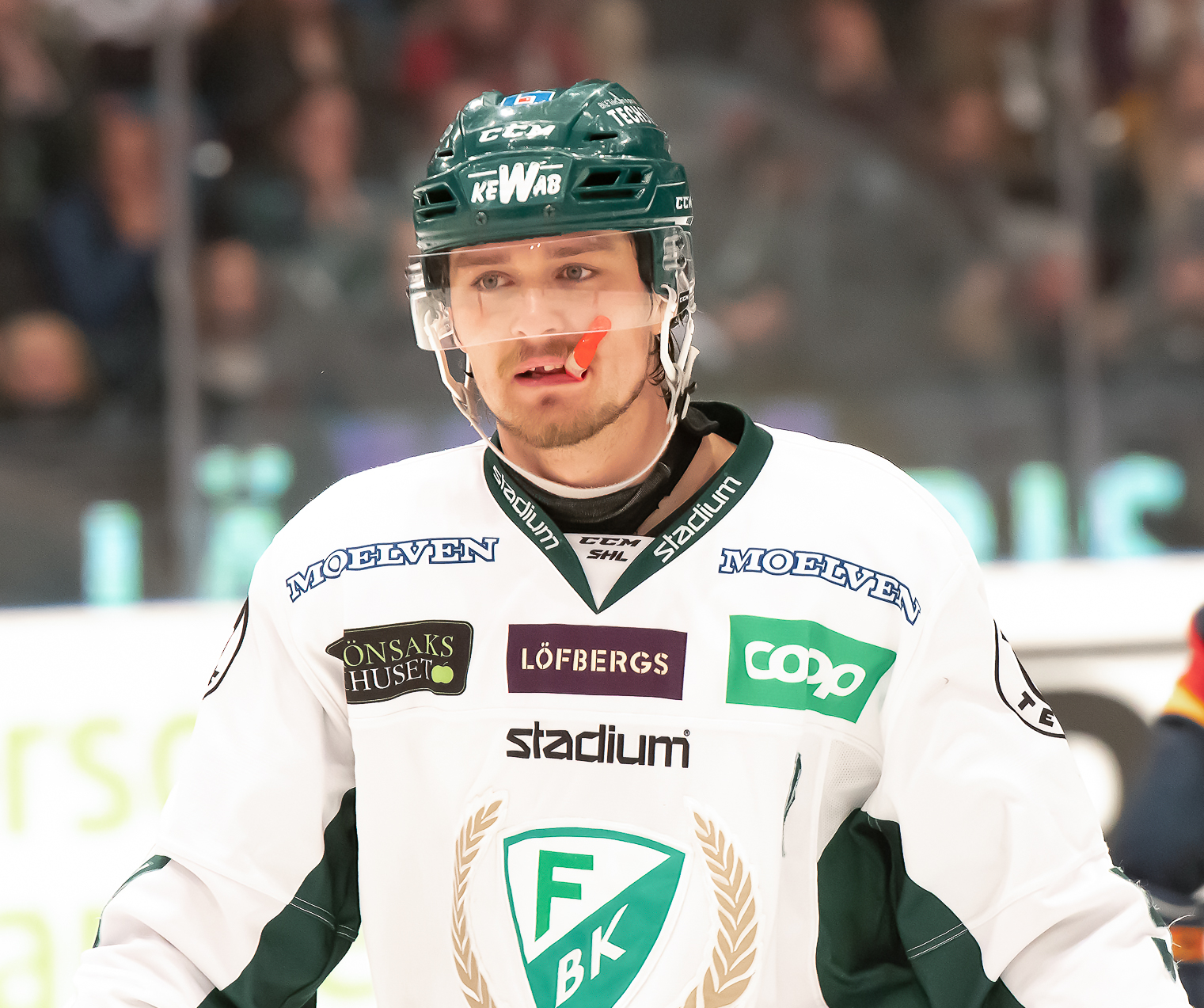
- Johansson in 2019
- Born: 30 November 1992 (age 33) Ljungby, Sweden
- Height: 6 ft 3 in (191 cm)
- Weight: 194 lb (88 kg; 13 st 12 lb)
- Position: Centre
- Shoots: Left
- SHL team Former teams: Färjestad BK; Storhamar Dragons; Djurgårdens IF; HC Sochi; Neftekhimik Nizhnekamsk
- National team: Sweden
- NHL draft: Undrafted
- Playing career: 2014–present

Linus Johansson (born 30 November 1992) is a Swedish professional ice hockey forward who is currently playing for Färjestad BK in the Swedish Hockey League (SHL).

Johansson played in the Kontinental Hockey League (KHL) after serving as captain in his first tenure with Färjestad BK of the SHL.

== International play ==
Medal record

Representing Sweden

Ice hockey

World Championships
| Bronze medal – third place | 2024 Czech Republic | |

Johansson represented Sweden at the 2024 IIHF World Championship and won a bronze medal.

== Career statistics ==
=== Regular season and playoffs ===
| | | | Regular season | | | | | Playoffs |
| Season | Team | League | GP | G | A | Pts | PIM | GP | G | A | Pts | PIM |
|---|---|---|---|---|---|---|---|---|---|---|---|---|
| 2007–08 | IF Troja/Ljungby | J18 | 1 | 0 | 1 | 1 | 0 | — | — | — | — | — |
| 2008–09 | IF Troja/Ljungby | J18 | 26 | 15 | 14 | 29 | 28 | 1 | 0 | 1 | 1 | 2 |
| 2008–09 | IF Troja/Ljungby | J20 | 1 | 0 | 0 | 0 | 0 | — | — | — | — | — |
| 2009–10 | IF Troja/Ljungby | J18 | 13 | 6 | 11 | 17 | 8 | — | — | — | — | — |
| 2009–10 | IF Troja/Ljungby | J20 | 34 | 1 | 7 | 8 | 26 | — | — | — | — | — |
| 2010–11 | IF Troja/Ljungby | J20 | 31 | 10 | 18 | 28 | 38 | — | — | — | — | — |
| 2010–11 | IF Troja/Ljungby | Allsv | 2 | 0 | 0 | 0 | 0 | — | — | — | — | — |
| 2011–12 | Topeka Roadrunners | NAHL | 25 | 3 | 11 | 14 | 26 | — | — | — | — | — |
| 2011–12 | IF Troja/Ljungby | SWE.2 U20 | 6 | 5 | 3 | 8 | 43 | 3 | 1 | 2 | 3 | 6 |
| 2012–13 | Nittorps IK | SWE.3 | 21 | 9 | 12 | 21 | 38 | — | — | — | — | — |
| 2012–13 | Olofströms IK | SWE.3 | 11 | 6 | 8 | 14 | 6 | 4 | 1 | 1 | 2 | 4 |
| 2013–14 | Olofströms IK | SWE.3 | 38 | 18 | 40 | 58 | 36 | — | — | — | — | — |
| 2013–14 | IK Oskarshamn | Allsv | 5 | 0 | 1 | 1 | 27 | — | — | — | — | — |
| 2014–15 | Storhamar Dragons | NOR | 31 | 12 | 30 | 42 | 81 | 16 | 6 | 12 | 18 | 14 |
| 2015–16 | Mora IK | Allsv | 35 | 11 | 17 | 28 | 73 | 5 | 1 | 2 | 3 | 2 |
| 2016–17 | Djurgårdens IF | SHL | 46 | 9 | 6 | 15 | 18 | 3 | 1 | 1 | 2 | 4 |
| 2017–18 | Djurgårdens IF | SHL | 44 | 9 | 17 | 26 | 36 | 11 | 2 | 6 | 8 | 10 |
| 2018–19 | Färjestad BK | SHL | 51 | 10 | 15 | 25 | 67 | 13 | 2 | 4 | 6 | 14 |
| 2019–20 | Färjestad BK | SHL | 49 | 9 | 19 | 28 | 50 | — | — | — | — | — |
| 2020–21 | HC Sochi | KHL | 8 | 1 | 1 | 2 | 6 | — | — | — | — | — |
| 2020–21 | Neftekhimik Nizhnekamsk | KHL | 19 | 3 | 4 | 7 | 10 | — | — | — | — | — |
| 2021–22 | Färjestad BK | SHL | 43 | 13 | 13 | 26 | 30 | 19 | 5 | 6 | 11 | 35 |
| 2022–23 | Färjestad BK | SHL | 37 | 4 | 19 | 23 | 44 | 7 | 1 | 4 | 5 | 2 |
| 2023–24 | Färjestad BK | SHL | 49 | 8 | 10 | 18 | 64 | 4 | 0 | 1 | 1 | 6 |
| 2024–25 | Färjestad BK | SHL | 31 | 2 | 10 | 12 | 20 | 6 | 1 | 2 | 3 | 4 |
| SHL totals | | | 350 | 64 | 109 | 173 | 329 | 63 | 12 | 24 | 36 | 75 |

=== International ===
| Year | Team | Event | Result | GP | G | A | Pts | PIM |
|---|---|---|---|---|---|---|---|---|
| 2022 | Sweden | OG | 4th | 6 | 0 | 0 | 0 | 2 |
| 2023 | Sweden | WC | 6th | 3 | 0 | 1 | 1 | 0 |
| 2024 | Sweden | WC | 3rd place, bronze medalist(s) | 10 | 1 | 2 | 3 | 10 |
| Senior totals | | | | 19 | 1 | 3 | 4 | 12 |

== Awards and honours ==
| Award | Year |
SHL
| Le Mat Trophy (Färjestad BK) | 2022 |
