= Calvin Thürkauf =

Swiss ice hockey player (born 1997)

- Born: 27 June 1997 (age 29) Zug, Switzerland
- Height: 6 ft 2 in (188 cm)
- Weight: 212 lb (96 kg; 15 st 2 lb)
- Position: Forward
- Shoots: Left
- NL team Former teams: HC Lugano; Columbus Blue Jackets; EV Zug
- National team: Switzerland
- NHL draft: 185th overall, 2016; Columbus Blue Jackets
- Playing career: 2015–present

Calvin Thürkauf (born 27 June 1997) is a Swiss professional ice hockey player who is a forward for HC Lugano of the National League (NL). Thurkauf was selected by the Columbus Blue Jackets in the seventh round (185th overall) of the 2016 NHL entry draft.

== Playing career ==
Thürkauf as a youth played within the EV Zug junior ranks. In spending 5 seasons within Zug's development program, Thürkauf made his professional debut in the 2014–15 playoffs, appearing in one game on loan to SC Langenthal of the then second tier National League B (NLB).

With NHL aspirations, Thürkauf was selected 59th overall in the 2015 CHL Import Draft by the Kelowna Rockets of the Western Hockey League (WHL). In his first major junior season in North America, Thürkauf displayed his offensive potential in contributing with 18 goals and 45 points in 61 games as a rookie. He was selected in his second year of eligibility in the seventh-round, 185th overall, by the Columbus Blue Jackets in the 2016 NHL entry draft.

On 31 December 2016, Thürkauf was signed to a three-year, entry-level contract with the Blue Jackets. He placed second on team scoring in the 2016–17 season with the Rockets, establishing a career high 33 goals and 70 points in 60 regular season games.

In the final year of his entry-level contract with the Blue Jackets in the 2019–20 season, while playing with AHL affiliate, the Cleveland Monsters, Thürkauf received his first recall to the NHL on an emergency basis on 21 February 2020. He made his NHL debut with the Blue Jackets, appearing on the fourth-line, in a 4–3 shootout defeat to the Nashville Predators on 22 February 2020. He was returned to the AHL with the Monsters the following day.

As an impending restricted free agent and with the following 2020–21 North American season delayed due to the COVID-19 pandemic, Thürkauf was signed to a temporary contract with hometown Swiss club, EV Zug of the NL, on 24 August 2020.

On May 10, 2021, Thürkauf left the Blue Jackets organization and joined HC Lugano on a three-year deal through the 2023–24 season.

== International play ==
Medal record

Representing Switzerland

Ice hockey

World Championships
Silver medal – second place	2024 Czechia	
Silver medal – second place	2026 Switzerland	

Thürkauf has represented the Swiss national junior team at multiple tournaments. The first time he was selected to play for the national junior team, was during the 2014 Ivan Hlinka Memorial Tournament. He later captained Switzerland at the 2017 World Junior Championships in Canada, posting 4 points in 4 games in a 7th-placed finish.

He represented Switzerland at the 2024 IIHF World Championship and won a silver medal.

== Career statistics ==
=== Regular season and playoffs ===
			Regular season					Playoffs
Season	Team	League	GP	G	A	Pts	PIM	GP	G	A	Pts	PIM
2012–13	EV Zug	Elite. A	4	1	0	1	2	2	0	0	0	0
2013–14	EV Zug	Elite. A	8	1	1	2	6	2	0	0	0	4
2014–15	EV Zug	Elite. A	38	11	10	21	54	12	1	1	2	20
2014–15	SC Langenthal	NLB	—	—	—	—	—	1	0	0	0	4
2015–16	Kelowna Rockets	WHL	61	18	27	45	54	18	2	6	8	16
2016–17	Kelowna Rockets	WHL	60	33	37	70	87	17	8	13	21	24
2017–18	Cleveland Monsters	AHL	75	11	13	24	40	—	—	—	—	—
2018–19	Cleveland Monsters	AHL	26	2	0	2	24	—	—	—	—	—
2019–20	Cleveland Monsters	AHL	53	9	17	26	37	—	—	—	—	—
2019–20	Columbus Blue Jackets	NHL	3	0	0	0	0	—	—	—	—	—
2020–21	EV Zug	NL	22	3	2	5	26	—	—	—	—	—
2021–22	HC Lugano	NL	50	16	19	35	65	6	1	3	4	4
2022–23	HC Lugano	NL	52	11	8	19	61	8	3	4	7	12
2023–24	HC Lugano	NL	52	28	32	60	34	9	1	7	8	6
2024–25	HC Lugano	NL	36	10	13	23	30	—	—	—	—	—
NHL totals			3	0	0	0	0	—	—	—	—	—
NL totals			212	68	74	142	216	23	5	14	19	22

=== International ===
Year	Team	Event	Result	GP	G	A	Pts	PIM
2014	Switzerland	IH18	7th	4	0	1	1	38
2015	Switzerland	U18	4th	7	1	2	3	12
2016	Switzerland	WJC	9th	5	1	1	2	2
2017	Switzerland	WJC	7th	4	2	2	4	16
2022	Switzerland	OG	8th	5	0	2	2	0
2022	Switzerland	WC	5th	6	2	0	2	0
2023	Switzerland	WC	5th	2	1	1	2	0
2024	Switzerland	WC	2nd place, silver medalist(s)	10	1	3	4	4
2026	Switzerland	OG	5th	5	0	0	0	0
2026	Switzerland	WC	2nd place, silver medalist(s)	10	3	4	7	10
Junior totals				20	4	6	10	68
Senior totals				38	7	10	17	14
