= 2024–25 Champions Hockey League =

European ice hockey tournament

Tournament details
- Dates: 5 September 2024 – 18 February 2025
- Teams: 24

Final positions
- Champions: (Switzerland) ZSC Lions (1st title)
- Runners-up: (Sweden) Färjestad BK

Tournament statistics
- Games played: 101
- Goals scored: 580 (5.74 per game)
- Attendance: 411,087 (4,070 per game)
- Scoring leader: (Switzerland) Sven Andrighetto (22 points)

Awards
- MVP: (Switzerland) Sven Andrighetto

The 2024–25 Champions Hockey League was the 10th season of the Champions Hockey League, a European ice hockey tournament. The tournament was competed by 24 teams, with qualification being on sporting merits only. Apart from the reigning champion, the six founding leagues were represented by three teams each, while five "challenge leagues" were represented by one team each.

Swiss team ZSC Lions won their first Champions Hockey League title, defeating Swedish team Färjestad BK 2–1 in the final. This made ZSC Lions the second Swiss side to win the title. The title holders Genève-Servette HC lost to ZSC Lions in the semi-finals with an aggregate score of 9–4.

Swiss right winger Sven Andrighetto from ZSC Lions became the top scorer with 22 points.

== Team allocation ==
A total of 24 teams from different European first-tier leagues were scheduled to participate in the league. Besides the title holders Genève-Servette HC, 18 teams from the six founding leagues, as well as the national champions from Denmark, France, Norway, Poland and the United Kingdom.

The qualification criteria for national leagues was based on the following rules:

1. CHL champions
2. National league champions (play-off winners)
3. Regular season winners
4. Regular season runners-up
5. Regular season third-placed team

Note: the national league champions of the United Kingdom were distinct from the national champions, who were determined in play-offs following the regular season.

=== Teams ===
Team	City/Area	League	Qualification	Participation	Previous best
(Switzerland) Genève-Servette HC	Geneva	National League	2024 CHL winners	4th	Champion
(Sweden) Skellefteå AIK	Skellefteå	Swedish Hockey League	Play-off winners	9th	Final
(Sweden) Färjestad BK	Karlstad	Swedish Hockey League	Regular season winners	7th	Quarter-finals
(Sweden) Växjö Lakers	Växjö	Swedish Hockey League	Regular season runners-up	8th	Final
(Switzerland) ZSC Lions	Zürich	National League	Play-off winners	8th	Quarter-finals
(Switzerland) HC Fribourg-Gottéron	Fribourg	National League	Regular season runners-up	6th	Semi-finals
(Switzerland) Lausanne HC	Lausanne	National League	Regular season third place	3rd	Quarter-finals
(Germany) Eisbären Berlin	Berlin	Deutsche Eishockey Liga	Play-off winners	7th	Round of 16
(Germany) Fischtown Pinguins	Bremerhaven	Deutsche Eishockey Liga	Regular season winners	2nd	Group stage
(Germany) Straubing Tigers	Straubing	Deutsche Eishockey Liga	Regular season third	2nd	Round of 16
(Finland) Tappara	Tampere	Liiga	Play-off winners	10th	Champion
(Finland) Ilves	Tampere	Liiga	Regular season runners-up	3rd	Round of 16
(Finland) Pelicans	Lahti	Liiga	Regular season third place	3rd	Round of 16
(Czech Republic) Oceláři Třinec	Třinec	Czech Extraliga	Play-off winners	9th	Semi-finals
(Czech Republic) Dynamo Pardubice	Pardubice	Czech Extraliga	Regular season winners	5th	Quarter-finals
(Czech Republic) Sparta Praha	Prague	Czech Extraliga	Regular season runners-up	6th	Final
(Austria) Red Bull Salzburg	Salzburg	ICE Hockey League	Play-off winners	9th	Semi-finals
(Austria) EC KAC	Klagenfurt	ICE Hockey League	Regular season winners	5th	Round of 16
(Hungary) Fehérvár AV19	Székesfehérvár	ICE Hockey League	Regular season runners-up	2nd	Group stage
(United Kingdom) Sheffield Steelers	Sheffield	Elite Ice Hockey League	Regular season winners	3rd	Group stage
(France) Dragons de Rouen	Rouen	Ligue Magnus	Play-off winners	5th	Quarter-finals
(Norway) Storhamar	Hamar	EliteHockey Ligaen	Play-off winners	3rd	Round of 16
(Denmark) SønderjyskE Ishockey	Vojens	Metal Ligaen	Play-off winners	4th	Group stage
(Poland) Unia Oświęcim	Oświęcim	Polska Hokej Liga	Play-off winners	1st	First appearance

== Round and draw dates ==
The schedule of the competition was as follows.

Phase	Round	Draw date	First leg	Second leg
Group stage	Matchday 1	22 May 2024	5–6 September 2024	
Group stage	Matchday 2	22 May 2024	7–8 September 2024	
Group stage	Matchday 3	22 May 2024	12–13 September 2024	
Group stage	Matchday 4	22 May 2024	14–15 September 2024	
Group stage	Matchday 5	22 May 2024	8–9 October 2024	
Group stage	Matchday 6	22 May 2024	15–16 October 2024	
Playoff	Round of 16	No draw	12–13 November 2024	19–20 November 2024
Playoff	Quarter-finals	No draw	3–4 December 2024	17 December 2024
Playoff	Semi-finals	No draw	14–15 January 2025	21–22 January 2025
Playoff	Final	No draw	18 February 2025	

== Regular season ==
Teams in the 2024–25 Champions Hockey League.

In the regular season the 24 teams were combined into one table. Each team played home and away against six different opponents once. The best sixteen teams qualified to the round of 16.

The draw of the regular season took place on 22 May 2024 in Prague, Czechia.

=== Pots ===
The participating teams were seeded into Pots A to D according to their achievements in their national leagues and their respective league’s standing in the CHL league ranking. The reigning CHL champions Genève-Servette HC were the top seeded team and therefore given a place in pot A. The top pot also contained the reigning champions of four of the top five founding leagues according to the league rankings (Sweden, Switzerland, Germany, Finland and Czechia). Pot D contained 2023–24 ICE Hockey League regular season runners-up Fehérvár AV19 and champions of five challenger leagues.

Pot A	Pot B	Pot C	Pot D
(Switzerland) Genève-Servette HC (Sweden) Skellefteå AIK (Switzerland) ZSC Lions (Germany) Eisbären Berlin (Finland) Tappara (Czech Republic) Oceláři Třinec	(Austria) Red Bull Salzburg (Sweden) Färjestad BK (Switzerland) HC Fribourg-Gottéron (Germany) Fischtown Pinguins (Finland) Ilves (Czech Republic) Dynamo Pardubice	(Austria) EC KAC (Sweden) Växjö Lakers (Switzerland) Lausanne HC (Germany) Straubing Tigers (Finland) Pelicans (Czech Republic) Sparta Praha	(Hungary) Fehérvár AV19 (United Kingdom) Sheffield Steelers (France) Dragons de Rouen (Norway) Storhamar (Denmark) SønderjyskE Ishockey (Poland) Unia Oświęcim

=== Grid ===
A1	(Finland) Tappara	A2	(Sweden) Skellefteå AIK	A3	(Germany) Eisbären Berlin	A4	(Switzerland) ZSC Lions	A5	(Czech Republic) Oceláři Třinec	A6	(Switzerland) Genève-Servette HC
B1	(Germany) Fischtown Pinguins	B2	(Czech Republic) Dynamo Pardubice	B3	(Austria) Red Bull Salzburg	B4	(Switzerland) HC Fribourg-Gottéron	B5	(Finland) Ilves	B6	(Sweden) Färjestad BK
C1	(Finland) Pelicans	C2	(Czech Republic) Sparta Praha	C3	(Germany) Straubing Tigers	C4	(Sweden) Växjö Lakers	C5	(Austria) EC KAC	C6	(Switzerland) Lausanne HC
D1	(Hungary) Fehérvár AV19	D2	(Denmark) SønderjyskE Ishockey	D3	(United Kingdom) Sheffield Steelers	D4	(Poland) Unia Oświęcim	D5	(Norway) Storhamar	D6	(France) Dragons de Rouen

=== League table ===
Pos	Team	Pld	W	OTW	OTL	L	GF	GA	GD	Pts	Qualification
1	(Sweden) Färjestad BK	6	5	1	0	0	26	10	+16	17	Qualification to playoffs
2	(Switzerland) ZSC Lions	6	4	1	0	1	20	10	+10	14	Qualification to playoffs
3	(Switzerland) Lausanne HC	6	4	0	2	0	17	9	+8	14	Qualification to playoffs
4	(Czech Republic) Oceláři Třinec	6	3	1	1	1	24	16	+8	12	Qualification to playoffs
5	(Switzerland) HC Fribourg-Gottéron	6	3	1	1	1	23	16	+7	12	Qualification to playoffs
6	(Sweden) Skellefteå AIK	6	3	1	1	1	19	15	+4	12	Qualification to playoffs
7	(Germany) Eisbären Berlin	6	3	1	0	2	22	15	+7	11	Qualification to playoffs
8	(Austria) Red Bull Salzburg	6	3	1	0	2	20	13	+7	11	Qualification to playoffs
9	(Finland) Pelicans	6	3	1	0	2	24	18	+6	11	Qualification to playoffs
10	(United Kingdom) Sheffield Steelers	6	2	2	1	1	18	13	+5	11	Qualification to playoffs
11	(Germany) Fischtown Pinguins	6	3	0	1	2	17	13	+4	10	Qualification to playoffs
12	(Sweden) Växjö Lakers	6	3	0	1	2	13	12	+1	10	Qualification to playoffs
13	(Czech Republic) Sparta Praha	6	3	0	1	2	13	15	−2	10	Qualification to playoffs
14	(Switzerland) Genève-Servette HC	6	2	1	2	1	21	19	+2	10	Qualification to playoffs
15	(Germany) Straubing Tigers	6	2	1	1	2	14	14	0	9	Qualification to playoffs
16	(Finland) Tappara	6	2	1	0	3	20	16	+4	8	Qualification to playoffs
17	(Czech Republic) Dynamo Pardubice	6	2	0	2	2	20	13	+7	8	
18	(Poland) Unia Oświęcim	6	2	0	2	2	18	23	−5	8	
19	(Finland) Ilves	6	1	2	0	3	17	21	−4	7	
20	(Austria) EC KAC	6	1	1	0	4	14	24	−10	5	
21	(Norway) Storhamar	6	0	2	1	3	10	17	−7	5	
22	(France) Dragons de Rouen	6	0	0	1	5	12	33	−21	1	
23	(Hungary) Fehérvár AV19	6	0	0	0	6	8	27	−19	0	
24	(Denmark) SønderjyskE Ishockey	6	0	0	0	6	5	33	−28	0	

Source: Champions Hockey League

=== Regular season tie-breaking criteria ===
Teams were ranked according to points (3 points for a win in regulation time, 2 points for a win in overtime, 1 point for a loss in overtime, 0 points for a loss in regulation time). If two or more teams were tied on points, the following tiebreaking criteria was applied, in the order given, to determine the rankings (see 8.4.4. Tie breaking formula group stage standings):

1. Greater number of wins in regulation time (3 point wins);
2. Greater number of wins in total (regulation time wins + overtime and shootout wins);
3. Better goal difference;
4. More goals scored;
5. More away goals scored;
6. The higher position in the CHL Draw pot allocation.

=== Results ===
Home \ Away	ROU	KLA	BER	FBK	FEH	BRE	GEN	PAR	FRI	ILV	LAU	TŘI	PEL	RBS	SHE	SKE	SØN	PRA	STO	STR	TAP	UNI	VÄX	ZSC
Dragons de Rouen		2–4								3–4 SO		3–5												
EC KAC									0–4													4–5		1–5
Eisbären Berlin								3–2 SO									8–0	3–0						
Färjestad BK		6–2										3–2 OT							3–1					
Fehérvár AV19				1–3			2–5				1–3													
Fischtown Pinguins	4–2						3–2				1–2													
Genève-Servette HC		2–3 OT								4–3									4–3 SO					
Dynamo Pardubice					7–0								2–3								5–1			
HC Fribourg-Gottéron			9–3												4–3					3–2 OT				
Ilves																						4–3 OT	3–0	1–4
Lausanne HC										7–2		1–2 OT							2–3 OT					
Oceláři Třinec									7–3													7–3	1–3	
Pelicans	10–1			0–5			5–4 SO																	
Red Bull Salzburg																3–4	6–2	1–2						
Sheffield Steelers								3–2 SO								3–2		5–1						
Skellefteå AIK					4–2	3–2 OT							4–2											
SønderjyskE Ishockey						0–5							2–4								1–7			
Sparta Praha					5–2	4–2															1–2 SO			
Storhamar									1–0 SO														1–4	1–4
Straubing Tigers								3–2								3–2 SO	3–0							
Tappara	6–1			4–6							0–2													
Unia Oświęcim			1–4											2–3 OT						4–1				
Växjö Lakers			3–1											1–3	2–3 OT									
ZSC Lions														2–4	2–1 SO					3–2				

Source: Champions Hockey League
Legend: Blue = home team win; Red = away team win.
Matches with lighter background shading were decided after overtime.

== Playoffs ==
=== Format ===
In the playoffs, pairings will be formed based on the positions of the teams in the regular season as follows: the team finished 1st in the regular season faced the team finished 16th, the team finished 2nd faced the team finished 15th, and so on. There will be no play-off draw or any reseedings for the quarter-finals and semi-finals. In each round except the final, the teams play two games and the aggregate score decides which team advances. The first leg is hosted by the team with the lower seed with the second leg being played on the home ice of the other team. If aggregate score is tied, a sudden death overtime follows. If the overtime is scoreless, the team who wins the shoot out competition advances.

The final will be played on the home ice of the team with the higher accumulative ranking across the entire campaign, including play-off games.

=== Bracket ===
Round of 16
16	(Finland) Tappara	2	3	5
1	(Sweden) Färjestad BK (OT)	3	3	6
9	(Finland) Pelicans	1	0	1
8	(Austria) Red Bull Salzburg	2	5	7
13	(Czech Republic) Sparta Praha	4	1	5
4	(Czech Republic) Oceláři Třinec	1	1	2
12	(Sweden) Växjö Lakers	1	3	4
5	(Switzerland) HC Fribourg-Gottéron	0	3	3
11	(Germany) Fischtown Pinguins	5	5	10
6	(Sweden) Skellefteå AIK	0	1	1
3	(Switzerland) Lausanne HC	0	4	4
14	(Switzerland) Genève-Servette HC	5	7	12
10	(United Kingdom) Sheffield Steelers	3	2	5
7	(Germany) Eisbären Berlin	5	4	9
15	(Germany) Straubing Tigers	2	1	3
2	(Switzerland) ZSC Lions	4	7	11

Quarter-finals
1	(Sweden) Färjestad BK	1	6	7
8	(Austria) Red Bull Salzburg	3	0	3
13	(Czech Republic) Sparta Praha (OT)	1	6	7
12	(Sweden) Växjö Lakers	2	4	6
11	(Germany) Fischtown Pinguins	0	2	2
14	(Switzerland) Genève-Servette HC	4	2	6
7	(Germany) Eisbären Berlin	3	4	7
2	(Switzerland) ZSC Lions	4	5	9

Semi-finals
1	(Sweden) Färjestad BK	6	4	10
13	(Czech Republic) Sparta Praha	2	2	4
14	(Switzerland) Genève-Servette HC	1	3	4
2	(Switzerland) ZSC Lions	6	3	9

Final
1	(Sweden) Färjestad BK	1
2	(Switzerland) ZSC Lions	2

=== Round of 16 ===
The first legs were played on 12 and 13 November with return legs played on 19 and 20 November 2024.

Team 1	Agg.	Team 2	1st leg	2nd leg
Tappara (Finland)	5–6	(Sweden) Färjestad BK (OT)	2–3	3–3
Straubing Tigers (Germany)	3–11	(Switzerland) ZSC Lions	2–4	1–7
Lausanne HC (Switzerland)	4–12	(Switzerland) Genève-Servette HC	0–5	4–7
Sparta Praha (Czech Republic)	5–2	(Czech Republic) Oceláři Třinec	4–1	1–1
Växjö Lakers (Sweden)	4–3	(Switzerland) HC Fribourg-Gottéron	1–0	3–3
Fischtown Pinguins (Germany)	10–1	(Sweden) Skellefteå AIK	5–0	5–1
Sheffield Steelers (United Kingdom)	5–9	(Germany) Eisbären Berlin	3–5	2–4
Pelicans (Finland)	1–7	(Austria) Red Bull Salzburg	1–2	0–5

The first game took place at the venue of the higher-seeded team, rather than at the venue of the lower-seeded team, as the rules required.

==== (1) Färjestad BK vs. (16) Tappara ====
12 November 2024; 17:30 CET (18:30 EEST)	Tappara (Finland)	2–3 (1–0, 1–1, 0–2)	(Sweden) Färjestad BK	Nokia Arena, Tampere; Attendance: 5,137

Game reference

Juha Metsola
Goalies
Maxime Lagacé
Referees:
Cedric Borga
Phillip Ströbel
Linesmen:
Luka Mäkinen
Tommi Niittylä

Halloran (Keskinen, Gallet) – 7:50	1–0
Gallet (Tanus) – 23:24	2–0
	2–1	28:22 – Steen (Ollas Mattson, Studenič)
	2–2	43:35 – Kellman (Bergkvist, Lindqvist) (PP)
	2–3	47:09 – Bergkvist (Studenič, Kellman) (PP)

4 min
Penalties
4 min
15
Shots
29

19 November 2024; 19:00 CET	Färjestad BK (Sweden)	3–3 (OT) (2–1, 0–0, 0–2) (OT 1–0)	(Finland) Tappara	Löfbergs Arena, Karlstad; Attendance: 2,686

Game reference

Maxime Lagacé
Goalies
Juha Metsola
Referees:
Michael Tscherrig
Marcus Vardeberg Wannerstedt
Linesmen:
Anders Nyqvist
Rasmus Strömberg

	0–1	5:02 – Quenneville (Brickley, Halloran) (PP)
Björklund (Lindqvist, Berglund) – 8:39	1–1
Lodin (Forsell, Westfält) – 15:37	2–1
	2–2	42:54 – Halloran (Mattila, Tanus) (PP2)
	2–3	58:09 – Tanus (Quenneville, Leskinen) (EA)
Lodin (Tomášek, Nygren) – 63:19	3–3

10 min
Penalties
4 min
28
Shots
31

Färjestad BK won 6–5 on aggregate.

==== (2) ZSC Lions vs. (15) Straubing Tigers ====
12 November 2024; 19:30 CET	Straubing Tigers (Germany)	2–4 (0–1, 2–1, 0–2)	(Switzerland) ZSC Lions	Eisstadion am Pulverturm, Straubing; Attendance: 3,548

Game reference

Zane McIntyre
Goalies
Šimon Hrubec
Referees:
Daniel Pražák
Marcus Vardeberg Wannerstedt
Linesmen:
Markus Merk
Tobias Schwenk

	0–1	13:56 – Malgin (Baltisberger, Andrighetto)
St. Denis (Samanski, Lipon) – 27:37	1–1
Brunnhuber (Zimmermann, Green) – 30:36	2–1
	2–2	37:12 – Andrighetto (Lehtonen, Malgin) (PP)
	2–3	48:58 – Lammikko (Frödén, Olsson)
	2–4	58:14 – Malgin (Andrighetto)

8 min
Penalties
4 min
22
Shots
29

19 November 2024; 19:45 CET	ZSC Lions (Switzerland)	7–1 (1–1, 3–0, 3–0)	(Germany) Straubing Tigers	Swiss Life Arena, Zurich; Attendance: 3,224

Game reference

Šimon Hrubec
Goalies
Zane McIntyre
Referees:
Christian Ofner
Christoph Sternat
Linesmen:
Eric Cattaneo
Michael Stalder

Andrighetto (Zehnder, Kinnunen) – 12:42	1–0
	1–1	19:18 – Samuelsson (Connolly)
Malgin (Andrighetto, Marti) – 28:36	2–1
Weber (Lammikko, Sigrist) – 31:05	3–1
Geering (Andrighetto) – 31:52	4–1
Lammikko (Kinnunen, Frödén) – 43:32	5–1
Baltisberger (Frödén, De Leo) (PP) – 52:21	6–1
Malgin (Andrighetto, Lehtonen) (PP) – 56:17	7–1

6 min
Penalties
31 min
32
Shots
18

ZSC Lions won 11–3 on aggregate.

==== (3) Lausanne HC vs. (14) Genève-Servette HC ====
12 November 2024; 19:45 CET	Lausanne HC (Switzerland)	0–5 (0–1, 0–2, 0–2)	(Switzerland) Genève-Servette HC	Vaudoise Aréna, Prilly; Attendance: 8,973

Game reference

Kevin Pasche
Goalies
Antti Raanta
Referees:
Mikael Holm
Marcus Linde
Linesmen:
Michael Stalder
Sébastien Duc

0–1	19:50 – Manninen (Granlund, Hartikainen)
0–2	22:40 – Richard (Miranda) (SH)
0–3	34:24 – Palve (Schneller, Cavelleri)
0–4	44:53 – Granlund (Vatanen, Hartikainen) (PP)
0–5	59:02 – Palve (Le Coultre)

10 min
Penalties
29 min
29
Shots
27

20 November 2024; 19:45 CET	Genève-Servette HC (Switzerland)	7–4 (2–2, 1–0, 4–2)	(Switzerland) Lausanne HC	Patinoire des Vernets, Geneva; Attendance: 6,254

Game reference

Robert Mayer
Goalies
Kevin Pasche
Antoine Keller
Referees:
Christoffer Holm
Manuel Nikolic
Linesmen:
Dominik Altmann
Aurélien Urfer

	0–1	1:49 – Riat (Suomela)
Palve (Manninen) – 6:33	1–1
Praplan (Jacquemet, Chanton) – 7:38	2–1
	2–2	14:28 – Riat (Fuchs)
Praplan – 24:00	3–2
Praplan (Jacquemet, Palve) – 41:42	4–2
Praplan (PS) – 47:06	5–2
	5–3	51:35 – Fuchs (Riat, Heldner)
Hartikainen (Granlund, Berni) (PP) – 51:57	6–3
Jooris (Praplan, Le Coultre) (PP) – 53:32	7–3
	7–4	54:37 – Hügli (Jäger, Marti)

8 min
Penalties
6 min
25
Shots
23

Genève-Servette HC won 12–4 on aggregate.

==== (4) Oceláři Třinec vs. (13) Sparta Praha ====
13 November 2024; 18:00 CET	Sparta Praha (Czech Republic)	4–1 (3–0, 0–1, 1–0)	(Czech Republic) Oceláři Třinec	O2 Arena, Prague; Attendance: 7,689

Game reference

Jakub Kovář
Goalies
Marek Mazanec
Referees:
André Schrader
Lukas Kohlmüller
Linesmen:
Daniel Hynek
Jiří Svoboda

Hyka (Sobotka, Mikliš) – 0:20	1–0
Hrabík (Kousal, Krejčík) (PP) – 8:49	2–0
Kousal (Mikliš, Chlapík) – 11:44	3–0
	3–1	39:58 – Kurovský (Kundrátek) (PP)
Irving (Chlapík, Horák) – 51:06	4–1

14 min
Penalties
10 min
33
Shots
31

20 November 2024; 18:00 CET	Oceláři Třinec (Czech Republic)	1–1 (0–1, 0–0, 1–0)	(Czech Republic) Sparta Praha	Werk Arena, Třinec; Attendance: 4,559

Game reference
Marek Mazanec	Goalies	Jakub Kovář	Referees: Tobias Björk; Linus Öhlund; Linesmen: Jiří Ondráček; Petr Šimánek
/ 0–1 / 19:38 – Kemiläinen (Hyka, Chlapík) (PP); Volas (Daňo, Addamo) – 57:41 / 1–1			Referees: Tobias Björk; Linus Öhlund; Linesmen: Jiří Ondráček; Petr Šimánek
31 min	Penalties	8 min	Referees: Tobias Björk; Linus Öhlund; Linesmen: Jiří Ondráček; Petr Šimánek
15	Shots	11	Referees: Tobias Björk; Linus Öhlund; Linesmen: Jiří Ondráček; Petr Šimánek

Sparta Praha won 5–2 on aggregate.

==== (5) HC Fribourg-Gottéron vs. (12) Växjö Lakers ====
12 November 2024; 19:00 CET	Växjö Lakers (Sweden)	1–0 (0–0, 1–0, 0–0)	(Switzerland) HC Fribourg-Gottéron	Vida Arena, Växjö; Attendance: 2,463

Game reference
Adam Åhman	Goalies	Reto Berra	Referees: Lassi Heikkinen; Andreas Huber; Linesmen: Ludvig Lundgren; Anders Nyqvist
Rosén (McLaughlin, Koivula) – 33:52 / 1–0			Referees: Lassi Heikkinen; Andreas Huber; Linesmen: Ludvig Lundgren; Anders Nyqvist
4 min	Penalties	8 min	Referees: Lassi Heikkinen; Andreas Huber; Linesmen: Ludvig Lundgren; Anders Nyqvist
23	Shots	14	Referees: Lassi Heikkinen; Andreas Huber; Linesmen: Ludvig Lundgren; Anders Nyqvist

19 November 2024; 19:45 CET	HC Fribourg-Gottéron (Switzerland)	3–3 (1–1, 0–1, 2–1)	(Sweden) Växjö Lakers	BCF Arena, Fribourg; Attendance: 5,043

Game reference

Reto Berra
Goalies
Emil Larmi
Referees:
Riku Brander
Kristian Vikman
Linesmen:
Dominik Schlegel
Nathy Bürgy

Schmid (Borgman, Diaz) – 3:18	1–0
	1–1	11:48 – Ågren (Strandberg, Sylvegård) (PP)
	1–2	25:17 – Eriksson (Henricksson, Nilsson)
de la Rose (Wallmark, Gunderson) (PP) – 48:49	2–2
Sörensen (Gunderson, de la Rose) (PP) – 49:45	3–2
	3–3	50:56 – Robert (Ågren, Persson)

2 min
Penalties
4 min
30
Shots
17

Växjö Lakers won 4–3 on aggregate.

==== (6) Skellefteå AIK vs. (11) Fischtown Pinguins ====
12 November 2024; 19:30 CET	Fischtown Pinguins (Germany)	5–0 (4–0, 0–0, 1–0)	(Sweden) Skellefteå AIK	Eisarena Bremerhaven, Bremerhaven; Attendance: 3,847

Game reference

Maximilian Franzreb
Goalies
David Rautio
Referees:
Mikko Kaukokari
Jiří Ondráček
Linesmen:
Patrick Laguzov
Kai Jürgens

Vikingstad (Görtz, Bruggisser) – 6:06	1–0
Jeglič (Bruggisser, Verlič) (PP) – 10:55	2–0
Urbas (Jensen, Jeglič) (PP) – 12:10	3–0
Mauermann (Görtz, Appendino) – 14:27	4–0
Kinder (Abt) (SH) – 42:46	5–0

16 min
Penalties
12 min
33
Shots
29

19 November 2024; 18:00 CET	Skellefteå AIK (Sweden)	1–5 (0–4, 0–0, 1–1)	(Germany) Fischtown Pinguins	Skellefteå Kraft Arena, Skellefteå; Attendance: 1,493

Game reference

Love Härenstam
Goalies
Kristers Gudļevskis
Referees:
Joonas Kova
Anssi Salonen
Linesmen:
Teodor Sörholm
Mathias Naperotti

	0–1	4:37 – Bruggisser (Görtz, Vikingstad)
	0–2	15:25 – Wejse (Jeglič, Urbas) (PP)
	0–3	16:19 – Görtz (Vikingstad, Abt) (PP)
	0–4	18:53 – Urbas (Jensen, Appendino)
	0–5	49:28 – Urbas (Wejse, Eminger)
Lindberg (Lindholm, Johansson) (PP) – 53:57	1–5

8 min
Penalties
4 min
39
Shots
17

Fischtown Pinguins won 10–1 on aggregate.

==== (7) Eisbären Berlin vs. (10) Sheffield Steelers ====
13 November 2024; 20:00 CET	Sheffield Steelers (United Kingdom)	3–5 (0–1, 3–2, 0–2)	(Germany) Eisbären Berlin	Utilita Arena Sheffield, Sheffield; Attendance: 8,983

Game reference

Matt Greenfield
Goalies
Jake Hildebrand
Referees:
Christian Ofner
Geoffrey Barcelo
Linesmen:
Scott Rodger
Ryan Fraley

	0–1	18:35 – Boychuk (Ronning, Pföderl)
	0–2	21:15 – Reinke (Kirk, Byron)
Simpson (Ciampini, Tansey) – 23:53	1–2
	1–3	27:45 – Ronning (Kirk, Pföderl)
Tremblay (Shudra) – 33:18	2–3
Cormier (Vainio, Whistle) – 39:07	3–3
	3–4	43:58 – Byron (Reinke)
	3–5	56:36 – Pföderl (Mik, Wissmann)

4 min
Penalties
6 min
22
Shots
35

19 November 2024; 19:30 CET	Eisbären Berlin (Germany)	4–2 (0–1, 2–0, 2–1)	(United Kingdom) Sheffield Steelers	Wellblechpalast, Berlin; Attendance: 4,227

Game reference

Jake Hildebrand
Goalies
Matthew Greenfield
Marco De Filippo
Referees:
Adam Kika
Robin Šír
Linesmen:
Yannik Koziol
Tom Giesen

	0–1	12:05 – Vallerand (Guimond, Ciampini) (PP)
Veilleux (Hördler, Wiederer) – 24:18	1–1
Geibel (Boychuk, Pföderl) – 25:48	2–1
Ronning (Pföderl, Reinke) – 48:53	3–1
	3–2	57:00 – Balmas (Watling, Simpson)
Byron (EN) – 57:46	4–2

12 min
Penalties
4 min
34
Shots
32

Eisbären Berlin won 9–5 on aggregate.

==== (8) Red Bull Salzburg vs. (9) Pelicans ====
12 November 2024; 17:30 CET (18:30 EEST)	Pelicans (Finland)	1–2 (0–0, 1–1, 0–1)	(Austria) Red Bull Salzburg	Isku Areena, Lahti; Attendance: 2,021

Game reference

Jasper Patrikainen
Goalies
Atte Tolvanen
Referees:
Stefan Hürlimann
Seedo Janssen
Linesmen:
Onni Hautamäki
Joni Pekkala

	0–1	25:23 – Huber (Rowe) (SH)
Bryggman (Junkkari, Carlsson) – 28:36	1–1
	1–2	44:52 – Bourke (Thaler, Wukovits)

6 min
Penalties
28 min
13
Shots
33

20 November 2024; 20:20 CET	Red Bull Salzburg (Austria)	5–0 (1–0, 1–0, 3–0)	(Finland) Pelicans	Eisarena Salzburg, Salzburg; Attendance: 2,412

Game reference

Atte Tolvanen
Goalies
Jasper Patrikainen
Referees:
Kilian Hinterdobler
Christopher Schadewaldt
Linesmen:
Gašper Jaka Zgonc
Simon Riecken

Bourke (SH) – 3:37	1–0
Thaler (Lewington, Bourke) – 29:30	2–0
Krening (Rowe) – 41:45	3–0
Huber (Rowe, Murphy) – 48:37	4–0
Schneider (Nissner, Raffl) – 56:24	5–0

12 min
Penalties
6 min
33
Shots
22

Red Bull Salzburg won 7–1 on aggregate.

=== Quarter-finals ===
First legs were played on 3 and 4 December with return legs played on 17 December 2024.

Team 1	Agg.	Team 2	1st leg	2nd leg
Red Bull Salzburg (Austria)	3–7	(Sweden) Färjestad BK	3–1	0–6
Eisbären Berlin (Germany)	7–9	(Switzerland) ZSC Lions	3–4	4–5
Genève-Servette HC (Switzerland)	6–2	(Germany) Fischtown Pinguins	4–0	2–2
Sparta Praha (OT) (Czech Republic)	7–6	(Sweden) Växjö Lakers	1–2	6–4

==== (1) Färjestad BK vs. (8) Red Bull Salzburg ====
3 December 2024; 18:00 CET	Red Bull Salzburg (Austria)	3–1 (1–1, 2–0, 0–0)	(Sweden) Färjestad BK	Eisarena Salzburg, Salzburg; Attendance: 2,281

Game reference

Atte Tolvanen
Goalies
Maxime Lagacé
Referees:
Michael Tscherrig
Lukas Kohlmüller
Linesmen:
Davide Mantovani
David Nothegger

Murphy (Raffl, Schneider) – 16:29	1–0
	1–1	17:02 – Studenič (Steen, Kellman)
Nienhuis (Schneider, Murphy) (SH) – 28:24	2–1
Kosmachuk (Robertson, Schneider) (PP) – 37:02	3–1

12 min
Penalties
37 min
30
Shots
19

17 December 2024; 19:00 CET	Färjestad BK (Sweden)	6–0 (0–0, 3–0, 3–0)	(Austria) Red Bull Salzburg	Löfbergs Arena, Karlstad; Attendance: 4,035

Game reference

Maxime Lagacé
Goalies
Atte Tolvanen
Referees:
Lassi Heikkinen
Janne Wuorenheimo
Linesmen:
Rasmus Strömberg
Mathias Naperotti

Forsell (Nygren, Westfält) – 21:38	1–0
Westfält (Tomášek) – 25:47	2–0
Bergkvist (Steen, Kellman) – 31:57	3–0
Ljungkrantz (Lindqvist, Johansson) – 48:40	4–0
Tomášek (Steen, Lindqvist) (PP) – 49:43	5–0
Steen (Studenič, Bergkvist) (EN) – 56:37	6–0

10 min
Penalties
12 min
31
Shots
19

Färjestad BK won 7–3 on aggregate.

==== (2) ZSC Lions vs. (7) Eisbären Berlin ====
4 December 2024; 19:30 CET	Eisbären Berlin (Germany)	3–4 (1–0, 2–2, 0–2)	(Switzerland) ZSC Lions	Uber Arena, Berlin; Attendance: 5,218

Game reference

Jonas Stettmer
Goalies
Šimon Hrubec
Referees:
Christoph Sternat
Manuel Nikolic
Linesmen:
Tom Giesen
Yanni kKoziol

Boychuk (Ronning, Pföderl) – 13:05	1–0
Fontaine (Tiffels) – 21:18	2–0
Bergmann (Fontaine) – 23:50	3–0
	3–1	29:55 – Grant (Malgin, Andrighetto)
	3–2	32:51 – Andrighetto (Lehtonen, Malgin) (PP)
	3–3	50:54 – Kukan (Lammikko)
	3–4	56:00 – Frödén (Lammikko)

6 min
Penalties
4 min
25
Shots
27

17 December 2024; 19:45 CET	ZSC Lions (Switzerland)	5–4 (0–3, 2–0, 3–1)	(Germany) Eisbären Berlin	Swiss Life Arena, Zurich; Attendance: 6,684

Game reference

Šimon Hrubec
Goalies
Jake Hildebrand
Referees:
Linus Öhlund
Daniel Eriksson
Linesmen:
Dario Fuchs
Sébastien Duc

	0–1	2:56 – Wissmann (Ronning, Pföderl) (PP)
	0–2	12:11 – Wiederer (Byron)
	0–3	19:57 – Tiffels
Frödén (Weber, Lehtonen) – 20:28	1–3
Sigrist (Andrighetto, Malgin) – 38:20	2–3
	2–4	42:11 – Byron (Müller, Noebels)
Lammikko (Frödén) – 42:33	3–4
Andrighetto (Kinnunen) – 49:13	4–4
Grant (Riedi, Rohrer) – 53:05	5–4

6 min
Penalties
10 min
26
Shots
21

ZSC Lions won 9–7 on aggregate.

==== (11) Fischtown Pinguins vs. (14) Genève-Servette HC ====
3 December 2024; 19:45 CET	Genève-Servette HC (Switzerland)	4–0 (2–0, 1–0, 1–0)	(Germany) Fischtown Pinguins	Patinoire des Vernets, Geneva; Attendance: 5,419

Game reference

Antti Raanta
Goalies
Maximilian Franzreb
Referees:
Christoffer Holm
Marcus Vardeberg Wannerstedt
Linesmen:
Michael Stalder
Aurélien Urfer

Lennström (Vatanen, Praplan) – 8:28	1–0
Granlund (Praplan, Jacquemet) – 18:13	2–0
Vatanen (Manninen, Pouliot) (PP) – 26:24	3–0
Bertaggia (Miranda, Le Coultre) – 52:42	4–0

4 min
Penalties
6 min
22
Shots
35

17 December 2024; 19:30 CET	Fischtown Pinguins (Germany)	2–2 (0–0, 0–0, 2–2)	(Switzerland) Genève-Servette HC	Eisarena Bremerhaven, Bremerhaven; Attendance: 4,436

Game reference

Maximilian Franzreb
Goalies
Antti Raanta
Referees:
Daniel Pražák
Jakub Šindel
Linesmen:
Kai Jürgens
Patrick Laguzov

	0–1	42:26 – Bertaggia (Völlmin, Lennström) (EN)
Bruggisser (Scheel) (PP) – 45:27	1–1
Urbas (Jeglič, Abt) (PP) – 45:43	2–1
	2–2	53:09 – Manninen (Pouliot) (EN)

4 min
Penalties
8 min
39
Shots
18

Genève-Servette HC won 6–2 on aggregate.

==== (12) Växjö Lakers vs. (13) Sparta Praha ====
3 December 2024; 18:00 CET	Sparta Praha (Czech Republic)	1–2 (0–0, 1–1, 0–1)	(Sweden) Växjö Lakers	O2 Arena, Prague; Attendance: 5,176

Game reference

Josef Kořenář
Goalies
Adam Åhman
Referees:
Micha Hebeisen
Cedric Borga
Linesmen:
Daniel Hynek
David Thuma

Špaček (Řepík, Hrabík) – 34:46	1–0
	1–1	37:22 – Strandberg (Sylvegård)
	1–2	58:00 – Rosén (Robert, Stjernborg)

2 min
Penalties
2 min
17
Shots
20

17 December 2024; 19:00 CET	Växjö Lakers (Sweden)	4–6 (OT) (2–0, 1–1, 1–4) (OT 0–1)	(Czech Republic) Sparta Praha	Vida Arena, Växjö; Attendance: 4,179

Game reference

Adam Åhman
Goalies
Jakub Kovář
Referees:
Marian Rohatsch
André Schrader
Linesmen:
Ludvig Lundgren
Anders Nyqvist

Stjernborg (Blichfeld, Rasmussen) – 2:48	1–0
Rosén (Strandberg, Gustafsson) – 16:10	2–0
	2–1	34:53 – Lajunen
Ågren (McLaughlin, Robert) – 36:04	3–1
	3–2	42:10 – Horák (Irving, Najman)
	3–3	43:10 – Krejčík (Lajunen, Vitouch)
Persson (Dennis Rasmussen) – 55:13	4–3
	4–4	57:52 – Moravčík (Sobotka, Chlapík) (EA)
	4–5	58:56 – Řepík (Krejčík, Lajunen) (EA)
	4–6	61:57 – Lajunen (Forman, Moravčík)

6 min
Penalties
8 min
28
Shots
26

Sparta Praha won 7–6 on aggregate in overtime.

=== Semi-finals ===
First legs were played on 14 and 15 January with return legs played on 21 January 2025.

Team 1	Agg.	Team 2	1st leg	2nd leg
Sparta Praha (Czech Republic)	4–10	(Sweden) Färjestad BK	2–6	2–4
Genève-Servette HC (Switzerland)	4–9	(Switzerland) ZSC Lions	1–6	3–3

==== (1) Färjestad BK vs. (13) Sparta Praha ====
14 January 2025; 18:00 CET	Sparta Praha (Czech Republic)	2–6 (1–2, 0–1, 1–3)	(Sweden) Färjestad BK	O2 Arena, Prague; Attendance: 11,682

Game reference

Josef Kořenář
Goalies
Maxime Lagacé
Referees:
Riku Brander
Christoph Sternat
Linesmen:
Jiří Svoboda
Josef Špůr

	0–1	1:39 – Lodin (Nygren, Westfält)
Lajunen (Kemiläinen, Špaček) (PP) – 5:58	1–1
	1–2	16:18 – Steen (Kellman, Studenič)
	1–3	25:58 – Ljungkrantz (Forsell, Bergkvist)
	1–4	40:45 – Studenič
	1–5	49:16 – Steen (Studenič)
Forman (Tomov) – 50:35	2–5
	2–6	50:46 – Nyström (Studenič)

4 min
Penalties
10 min
30
Shots
23

21 January 2025; 19:00 CET	Färjestad BK (Sweden)	4–2 (1–1, 2–1, 1–0)	(Czech Republic) Sparta Praha	Löfbergs Arena, Karlstad; Attendance: 6,836

Game reference

Maxime Lagacé
Goalies
Jakub Kovář
Referees:
Mikko Kaukokari
Micha Hebeisen
Linesmen:
Ludvig Lundgren
Anders Nyqvist

Kellman (Nyström) (PP) – 15:30	1–0
	1–1	17:08 – Řepík
Nygren (PP) – 21:34	2–1
Lindqvist (Lodin) – 27:25	3–1
	3–2	39:13 – Moravčík (Vitouch)
Studenič (Kellman) – 47:22	4–2

6 min
Penalties
8 min
16
Shots
16

Färjestad BK won 10–4 on aggregate.

==== (2) ZSC Lions vs. (14) Genève-Servette HC ====
15 January 2025; 20:15 CET	Genève-Servette HC (Switzerland)	1–6 (0–2, 0–4, 1–0)	(Switzerland) ZSC Lions	Patinoire des Vernets, Geneva; Attendance: 3,781

Game reference

Antti Raanta
Robert Mayer
Goalies
Šimon Hrubec
Referees:
André Schrader
Antonín Jeřábek
Linesmen:
Aurélien Urfer
Michael Stalder

	0–1	1:18 – Zehnder (Lammikko, Frödén)
	0–2	10:41 – Baechler (Kärki, Kukan)
	0–3	21:15 – Lehtonen (Lammikko, Frödén)
	0–4	27:45 – Balcers (Malgin, Andrighetto) (PP)
	0–5	30:30 – Balcers (Grant, Rohrer)
	0–6	35:04 – Grant (Andrighetto, Balcers) (PP)
Schneller (Bertaggia, Jacquemet) – 48:25	1–6

39 min
Penalties
6 min
22
Shots
33

21 January 2025; 20:15 CET	ZSC Lions (Switzerland)	3–3 (0–0, 2–1, 1–2)	(Switzerland) Genève-Servette HC	Swiss Life Arena, Zurich; Attendance: 6,400

Game reference

Robin Zumbühl
Goalies
Robert Mayer
Referees:
Tobias Björk (Sweden)
Mikael Holm (Sweden)
Linesmen:
Eric Cattaneo (Switzerland)
Dominik Altmann (Switzerland)

Rohrer – 21:55	1–0
Andrighetto (Malgin, Kukan) (PP2) – 36:19	2–0
	2–1	39::05 – Praplan (Le Coultre, Manninen) (PP)
Kinnunen (Segafredo, Baltisberger) – 43:55	3–1
	3–2	44:58 – Bertaggia (Berni, Richard)
	3–3	53:46 – Jooris (Manninen, Timashov) (PP)

4 min
Penalties
6 min
18
Shots
27

ZSC Lions won 9–4 on aggregate.

=== Final ===
18 February 2025; 20:15 CET	ZSC Lions (Switzerland)	2–1 (1–0, 1–0, 0–1)	(Sweden) Färjestad BK	Swiss Life Arena, Zurich; Attendance: 12,000

Game reference

Šimon Hrubec
Goalies
Maxime Lagacé
Referees:
André Schrader
Riku Brander
Linesmen:
Oto Durmis
Simon Riecken

Andrighetto (Balcers, Trutmann) – 17:48	1–0
Andrighetto (Balcers, Malgin) – 32:33	2–0
	2–1	51:05 – Åslund (Tomášek, Nygren) (PP)

10 min
Penalties
4 min
30
Shots
32

== Statistics ==
=== Scoring leaders ===
The following players lead the league in points.

Player	Team	GP	G	A	PTS	PIM	+/–	GWG	PPG	SHG	SOG	S%
(Switzerland) Sven Andrighetto	(Switzerland) ZSC Lions	12	10	12	22	4	+13	1	4	0	42	23.81%
(Switzerland) Denis Malgin	(Switzerland) ZSC Lions	11	6	12	18	4	+12	2	1	1	37	16.22%
(Sweden) Oskar Steen	(Sweden) Färjestad BK	13	6	12	18	8	+10	1	2	0	33	18.18%
(Czech Republic) Michael Špaček	(Switzerland) Genève-Servette HC / (Czech Republic) Sparta Praha	12	8	7	15	4	+5	1	5	0	25	32.00%
(Germany) Leonhard Pföderl	(Germany) Eisbären Berlin	10	5	10	15	4	0	2	3	0	22	22.73%
(Slovenia) Žiga Jeglič	(Germany) Fischtown Pinguins	10	3	10	13	2	+5	1	2	0	11	27.27%
(Sweden) Michael Lindqvist	(Sweden) Färjestad BK	11	2	11	13	4	+4	1	1	0	19	10.53%
(Slovenia) Jan Urbas	(Germany) Fischtown Pinguins	10	7	5	12	4	+5	0	4	0	32	21.88%
(Austria) Peter Schneider	(Austria) Red Bull Salzburg	10	5	7	12	6	+1	1	3	0	35	14.29%
(Slovakia) Libor Hudáček	(Czech Republic) Oceláři Třinec	6	4	8	12	4	+4	0	1	0	21	19.05%

=== Leading goaltenders ===
The following goaltenders lead the league in save percentage, provided that they have played at least 40% of their team's minutes.

Player	Team	GP	W	L	SV	GA	SV%	GAA	SO	MIN
(Germany) Maximilian Franzreb	(Germany) Fischtown Pinguins	6	3	2	138	9	93.88%	1.52	3	355
(Czech Republic) Šimon Hrubec	(Switzerland) ZSC Lions	10	10	0	236	17	93.28%	1.69	0	605
(Canada) Maxime Lagacé	(Sweden) Färjestad BK	11	8	2	229	18	92.71%	1.63	2	663
(United States) Matthew Greenfield	(United Kingdom) Sheffield Steelers	8	4	3	224	18	92.56%	2.47	0	438
(Czech Republic) Marek Mazanec	(Czech Republic) Oceláři Třinec	5	1	3	138	12	92.00%	2.40	0	300

=== Home Game and Overall ===
As of 18 February 2025

Pos.	Team	Regular season		Playoffs		Overall			2023–24 average
Pos.	Team	Matches	Attendance	Matches	Attendance	Matches	Total	Average	2023–24 average
1	(United Kingdom) Sheffield Steelers	3	23,933	1	8,983	4	32,916	8,229	–
2	(Czech Republic) HC Sparta Praha	3	15,330	3	24,547	6	39,877	6,646	–
3	(Czech Republic) Dynamo Pardubice	3	17,542	0	—	3	17,542	5,847	4,798
4	(Switzerland) ZSC Lions	3	9,950	4	28,308	7	38,258	5,465	–
5	(Finland) Tappara	3	15,933	1	5,137	4	21,070	5,268	4,044
6	(Switzerland) HC Fribourg-Gottéron	3	14,707	1	5,043	4	19,750	4,938	–
7	(Finland) Ilves	3	14,473	0	–	3	14,473	4,824	4,314
8	(Switzerland) Lausanne HC	3	9,805	1	8,973	4	18,778	4,695	–
9	(Germany) Fischtown Pinguins	3	12,915	2	8,283	5	21,198	4,240	–
10	(Germany) Eisbären Berlin	3	11,705	2	9,445	5	21,150	4,230	–
11	(Czech Republic) Oceláři Třinec	3	11,526	1	4,559	4	16,085	4,021	3,297
12	(Sweden) Färjestad BK	3	9,615	3	13,557	6	23,172	3,862	2,742
13	(Sweden) Växjö Lakers	3	12,162	2	6,642	5	18,804	3,761	2,618
14	(Germany) Straubing Tigers	3	10,550	1	3,548	4	14,098	3,525	–
15	(Switzerland) Genève-Servette HC	3	5,067	3	15,454	6	20,521	3,420	5,030
16	(Norway) Storhamar	3	9,603	0	—	3	9,603	3,201	–
17	(France) Dragons de Rouen	3	9,087	0	–	3	9,087	3,029	3,268
18	(Poland) Unia Oświęcim	3	8,215	0	—	3	8,215	2,738	–
19	(Austria) EC KAC	3	8,131	0	–	3	8,131	2,710	–
20	(Hungary) Fehérvár AV19	3	7,839	0	–	3	7,839	2,613	–
21	(Austria) Red Bull Salzburg	3	6,106	2	4,693	5	10,799	2,160	1,732
22	(Denmark) SønderjyskE Ishockey	3	6,108	0	—	3	6,108	2,036	–
23	(Sweden) Skellefteå AIK	3	6,088	1	1,493	4	7,581	1,895	3,173
24	(Finland) Pelicans	3	4,011	1	2,021	4	6,032	1,508	1,449
Tournament total		72	260,401	29	150,686	101	411,087	4,070	3,315

== Awards ==
=== Team of the Regular Season ===
The Team of the Regular Season was announced on 30 October 2024.

Position	Player	Team
Goaltender	(United States) Matthew Greenfield	(United Kingdom) Sheffield Steelers
Defenceman	(Canada) Dennis Eamon Robertson	(Austria) Red Bull Salzburg
Defenceman	(Sweden) Jonathan Pudas	(Sweden) Skellefteå AIK
Forward	(Czech Republic) Michael Špaček	(Czech Republic) Sparta Praha
Forward	(Czech Republic) Libor Hudáček	(Czech Republic) Oceláři Třinec
Forward	(Sweden) Marcus Sörensen	(Switzerland) HC Fribourg-Gottéron

=== MVP ===
LGT MVP Award nominees were announced on 16-18 January 2025. LGT MVP Award winner was announced on 18 February 2025.

Winner

Player	Team
(Switzerland) Sven Andrighetto	(Switzerland) ZSC Lions

Nominees

Player	Team
(Switzerland) Sven Andrighetto	(Switzerland) ZSC Lions
(Canada) Maxime Lagacé	(Sweden) Färjestad BK
(Finland) Antti Raanta	(Switzerland) Genève-Servette HC
(Czech Republic) Michael Špaček	(Czech Republic) Sparta Praha
(Sweden) Oskar Steen	(Sweden) Färjestad BK

=== Team of the Season ===
The Team of the Season was announced on 7 March 2025.

Position	Player	Team
Goaltender	(United States) Matthew Greenfield	(United Kingdom) Sheffield Steelers
Defenceman	(Canada) Ryan Murphy	(Austria) Red Bull Salzburg
Defenceman	(Germany) Kai Wissmann	(Germany) Eisbären Berlin
Forward	(Switzerland) Sven Andrighetto	(Switzerland) ZSC Lions
Forward	(Czech Republic) Michael Špaček	(Czech Republic) Sparta Praha
Forward	(Sweden) Oskar Steen	(Sweden) Färjestad BK
