= Matthew Greenfield (disambiguation) =

Matthew Greenfield is an American film producer.

Matthew Greenfield or Matt Greenfield may also refer to:

- Matthew Greenfield (ice hockey), ice hockey netminder
- Matthew Brian Greenfield, known as Matt Greenfield, American film producer and voice actor
