= Derek Grant (ice hockey, born 1990) =

Canadian ice hockey player

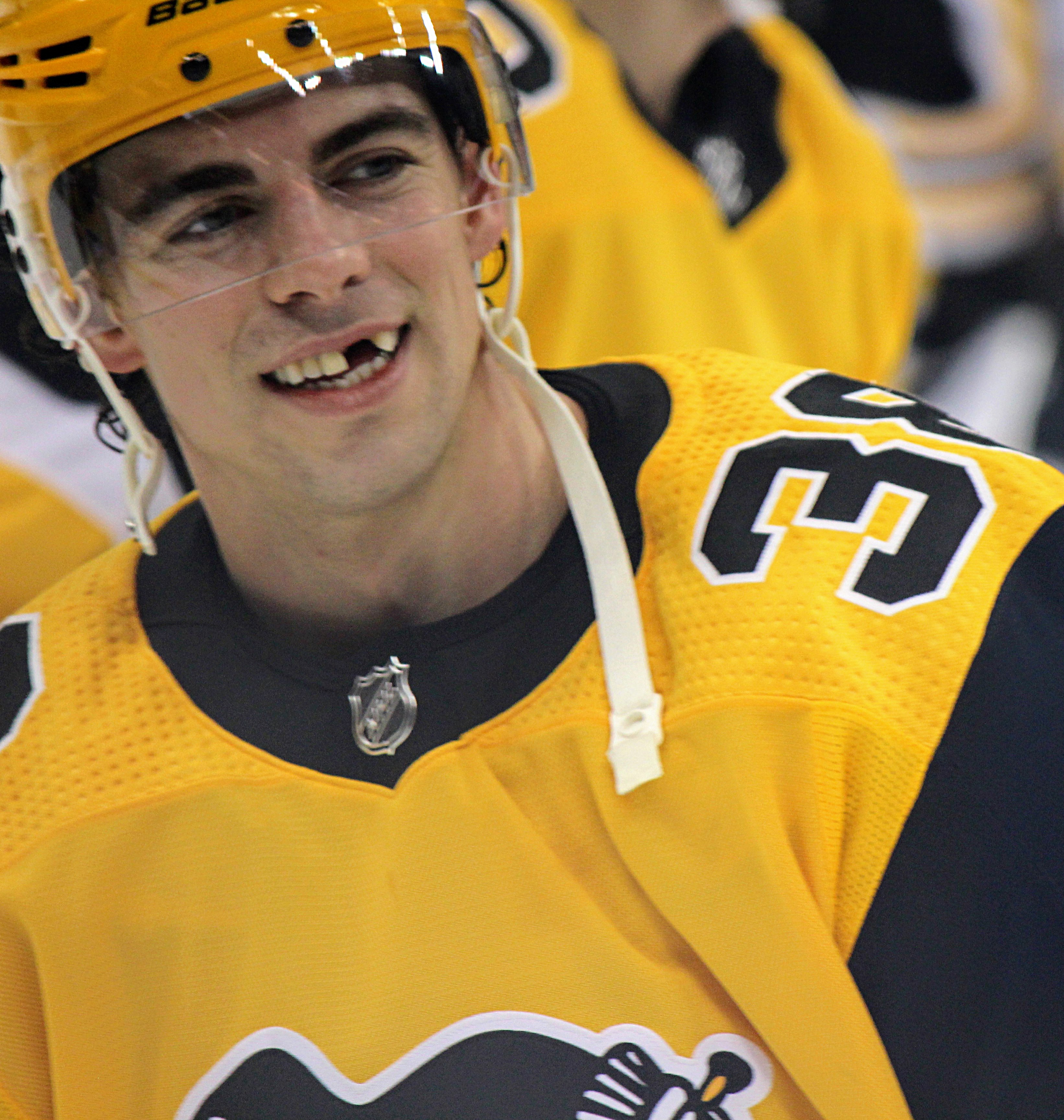
- Grant with the Pittsburgh Penguins in 2018
- Born: April 20, 1990 (age 36) Abbotsford, British Columbia, Canada
- Height: 6 ft 3 in (191 cm)
- Weight: 212 lb (96 kg; 15 st 2 lb)
- Position: Centre
- Shoots: Left
- NL team Former teams: ZSC Lions; Ottawa Senators; Calgary Flames; Buffalo Sabres; Nashville Predators; Anaheim Ducks; Pittsburgh Penguins; Philadelphia Flyers
- NHL draft: 119th overall, 2008; Ottawa Senators
- Playing career: 2011–present

Derek Grant (born April 20, 1990) is a Canadian professional ice hockey center for ZSC Lions of the National League (NL).

After being drafted in the 4th round (119th overall) of the 2008 NHL entry draft by the Ottawa Senators, Grant played with the NCAA Division I collegiate ice hockey with the Michigan State Spartans men's ice hockey team from 2009 to 2011. During this time, he earned numerous CCHA honors including being an Honorable Mention for the CCHA All-Rookie Team. Following his sophomore season, Grant joined the Senators organization and was assigned to their American Hockey League affiliate, the Binghamton Senators, to finish out the 2010–11 season. During this time, he helped the Senators in their 2011 Calder Cup playoffs push and won a Calder Cup.

== Early life ==
Grant was born on April 20, 1990, in Abbotsford, British Columbia, to parents Debi and Dean Grant.

== Playing career ==
=== Early career ===
Growing up in Abbotsford, Grant began playing ice hockey with his hometown Abbotsford Hawks atom team. During his time with the team, he helped them win silver in a 2002 Coquitlam tournament and was also named MVP. Once aging out of atoms, Grant went undrafted during the Western Hockey Leagues Bantam Draft due his short stature and subsequently joined the South East Flames of the B.C. Major Midget League. In his first season with the Flames, Grant broke his arm in November 2007 and missed significant time. However, he endured a growth spurt while recovering and returned standing at six-foot-three and weighing 180 pounds.

Following his growth spurt, Grant was recruited by the Junior B Abbotsford Pilots to try out for the team for the 2006–07 season. Upon making the roster, Grant led the team with 31 goals through 47 games. As such, he was scouted by the Swift Current Broncos and the Moose Jaw Warriors of the WHL but chose to commit to Michigan State University (MSU). During his breakout rookie season, Grant scored a hat-trick, including the game-winning goal, with 40 seconds left and was named the player of the game. Following the 2006–07 season with the Pilots, Grant played junior hockey with the Langley Chiefs of the British Columbia Hockey League (BCHL). After tallying 21 goals and 30 assists by January, he was named to the Coastal Conference in the BCHL All-Star Game and ranked 103rd amongst all North American skaters eligible for the 2008 NHL entry draft.

Once the 2007–08 season was concluded, Grant had recorded 24 goals and 63 points in his rookie season and was drafted 119th overall in the 2008 NHL entry draft by the Ottawa Senators. Following the draft, Grant returned to Langley for one more season before beginning his freshman season at MSU.

=== Collegiate ===
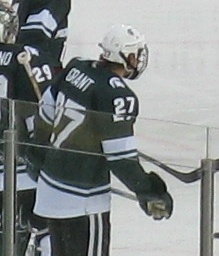
Grant playing for Michigan State in The Big Chill at the Big House

Grant played NCAA Division I collegiate ice hockey with the Michigan State Spartans men's ice hockey team from 2009 to 2011. Upon joining the Spartans as a freshman, Grant played on their top line with Corey Tropp and Nick Sucharski. On October 12, 2009, Grant was honored as the CCHA Rookie of the Week after he had tied the national lead in rookie scoring and in points per game, goals, and power-play points. At the conclusion of October, Grant was recognized by the CCHA as their Rookie of the Month after he tallied four goals and six assists through 10 games. This earned him praise from the Spartans head coach who called him a "complete player" and someone who is "more of a distributor of the puck than a guy who puts in 20 shots a night on goal." Grant concluded his rookie season with the Spartans third on the team in goals and tied for fourth in assists with 12 and 18 respectively. His play earned him Honorable Mention honors for the CCHA All-Rookie Team.

Grant returned to the Spartans for his sophomore campaign where he played alongside Brett Perlini and Zach Golembiewski. His second season did not start out as successfully as his freshman season as he went scoreless in his first eight games of the season. He eventually scored his first goal of the season in mid November during a five-point weekend against Ohio State University. As a result of the four assists and one goal in one weekend, Grant was the recipient of the CCHA Offensive Player of the Week honor on November 15, 2010.

=== Professional ===
==== Ottawa Senators ====
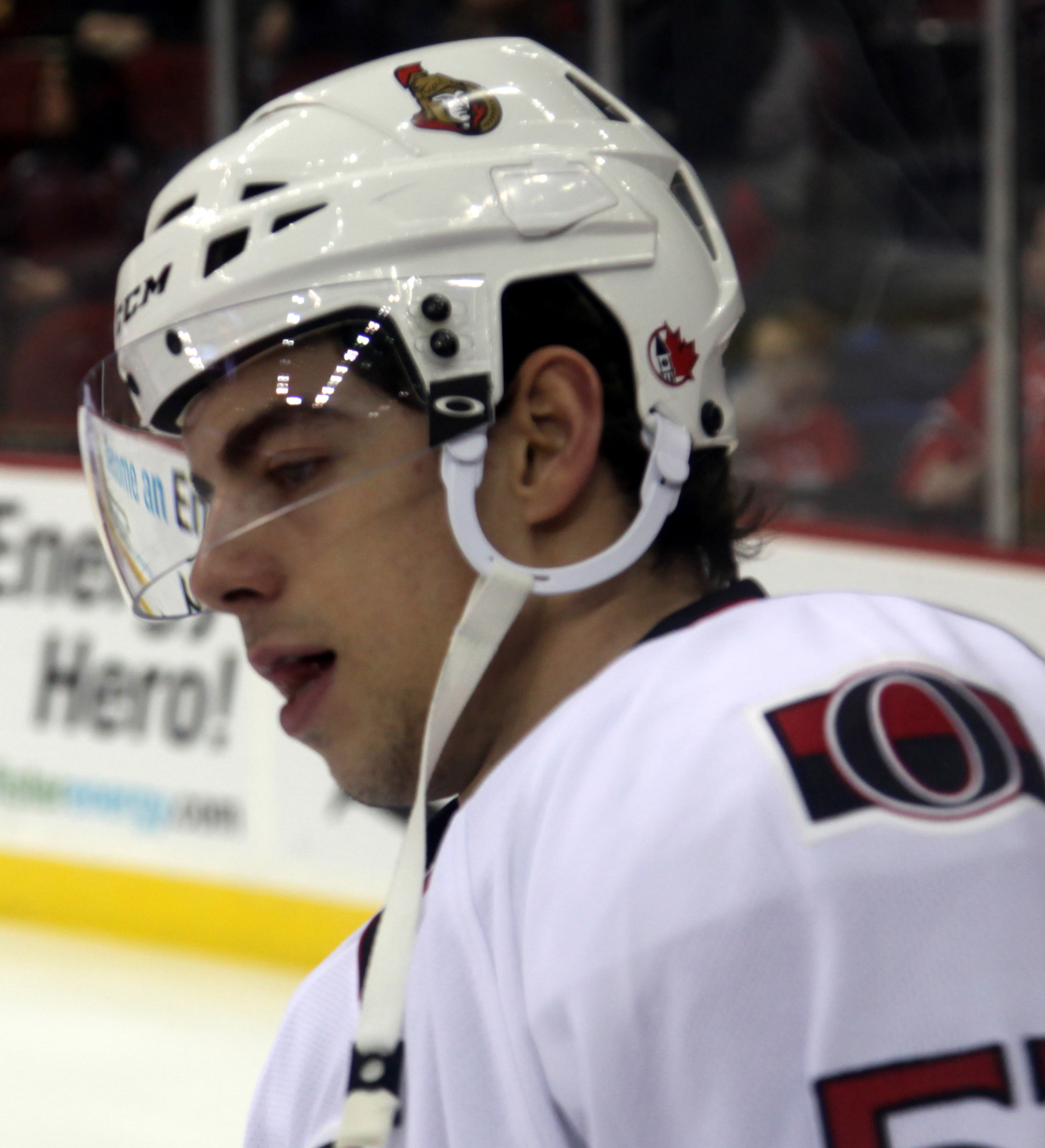
Grant with the Ottawa Senators in 2013.

Following his sophomore season at Michigan State, Grant chose to leave MSU and signed a three-year entry-level contract with the Senators on March 10, 2011. He was immediately assigned to their American Hockey League (AHL) affiliate, the Binghamton Senators, for the remainder of the season and 2011 Calder Cup playoffs push. Upon joining the Binghamton Senators, Grant earned his first professional career point with an assist in a 3–1 win over the Charlotte Checkers. He then scored the game-winning goal in overtime to tie their best-of-seven Atlantic Division series with the Manchester Monarchs. Grant helped the Senators overcame the Monarchs, the Portland Pirates, and the Checkers en route to the Calder Cup final, where they eliminated the Houston Aeros in six games.

Grant was invited to participate with the Ottawa Senators in the NHL's rookie tournament prior to the 2011–12 season where he played on the starting line alongside Corey Cowick and Stefan Noesen. Following the tournament, Grant was selected to participate in the Senators training camp but was returned to the AHL for the start of the season. He remained in the AHL for the entirety of the season where he tallied 23 points through 60 games.

On February 16, 2013, Grant made his NHL debut in a game against the Toronto Maple Leafs. He played in a total of five games before being reassigned to the AHL. Following his second full professional season, Grant was again invited to participate with the Ottawa Senators training camp prior to the start of the 2013–14 season. On July 10, 2014, Grant signed a one-year two-way contract extension with the Senators.

==== Calgary Flames ====
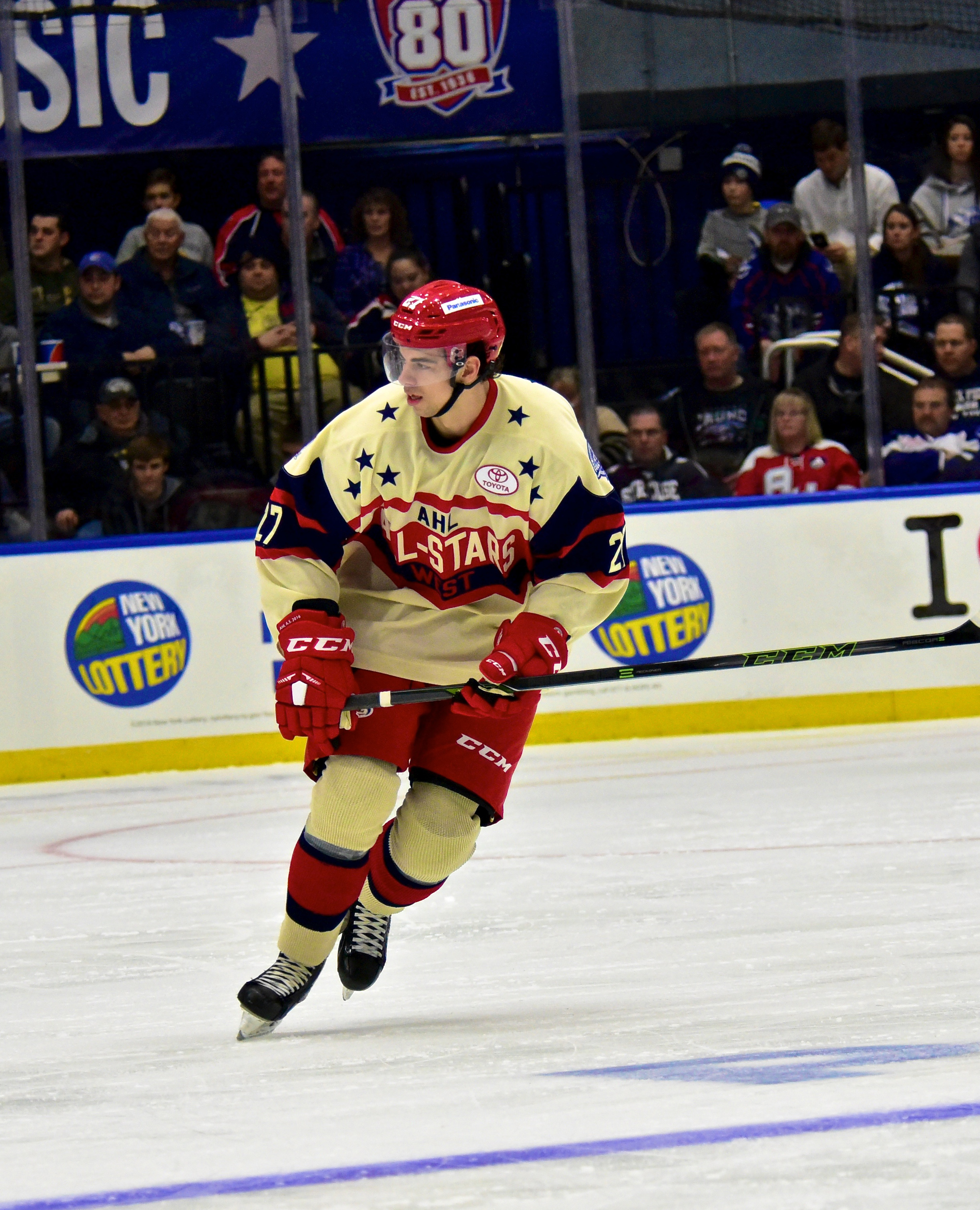
Grant during the 2016 AHL All-Star Game.

As Grant was not offered a new contract by the Senators, he signed a one-year contract with the Calgary Flames on July 1, 2015, as a free agent. Grant later stated that he chose to join the Flames organization due to their young core group. He attended the Flames' training camp but was re-assigned to their AHL affiliate, the Stockton Heat, prior to the start of the 2015–16 season. He was quickly recalled to the NHL level however after Micheal Ferland suffered an injury. Grant played in nine games for Calgary before being re-assigned to the AHL on November 16.

By January, Grant led the team in scoring with 16 goals and 20 points which included his 11 points in 11 games during December. Grant also recorded 51 shots on net in December, including an 11-shot effort during a 3-2 loss to the Bakersfield Condors. As a result of his overall play, Grant was chosen to represent the Heat at the 2016 AHL All-Star Game. Upon returning from the All-Star Game, Grant continued to generate offense and netted two goals and six points through two games. He finished the month with 10 goals and 9 assists for 19 points through 10 games. His efforts were recognized with the AHL Player Of The Month for January honor. Within the following two months, Grant missed numerous games to recover from a broken jaw but returned to the Heat's lineup and scored five points through two games.

Due to various injuries in the Flames' lineup, Grant and three other teammates were recalled to the NHL level on March 28, 2016. In his first game back with the Flames, he recorded his first career NHL point during their 5–2 win over the Arizona Coyotes. Upon returning to the AHL, Grant was named the Heat's Most Valuable Player, Offensive Player Of The Year, and this season's Fan Favourite.

==== Buffalo Sabres and Nashville Predators ====
On July 2, 2016, Grant signed a one-year two-way contract as a free agent with the Buffalo Sabres. After a successful training camp and pre-season with the Sabres, he made the opening night roster to begin the 2016–17 season. Grant appeared in 35 games with the Sabres, and tallied three assists, before being claimed by the Nashville Predators on January 11, 2017. He played six games with the Predators before being picked up by the Sabres after being waived. Upon being picked up, he was immediately assigned to their AHL affiliate, the Rochester Americans.

Although he was re-assigned to the AHL, Grant was quickly recalled to the NHL level a few days later due to various injuries. When speaking about the call-up, head coach Dan Bylsma said: "[Grant] being able to take draws in the pivot position would be an opportunity to use more of a four-line rotation...with Zemgus going out, [we're] definitely looking for a penalty killer to go into our lineup." A few weeks later, Grant suffered a shoulder injury during a game against the Colorado Avalanche and missed numerous games to recover. He was re-assigned to the AHL on February 24 while Justin Bailey and Evan Rodrigues were recalled in his place.

Grant played out the rest of the season with the Americans and regained his scoring touch by contributing 19 points through 23 games. He began by scoring his first goal since March 26, 2016, to lift the team to a 4–3 win over the Toronto Marlies on March 8, 2017. Following this, Grant scored six goals over three games to help the Americans rank sixth in the North Division with 56 points.

==== Anaheim Ducks ====
As a result of his play during the 2016–17 season, Grant signed a one-year, one-way deal on the second day of free agency with the Anaheim Ducks. With the Ducks suffering through early injuries at training camp, Grant made the opening night roster for the 2017–18 season. Upon joining the Ducks' lineup, Grant appeared to score his first goal on October 11 against the Vancouver Canucks before it was called back due to it being ruled offside. He officially recorded his first two NHL goals a few games later on October 20 against the Montreal Canadiens. Grant continued to produce offensively and quickly tied his career-high four points in a single season by late October. Grant added an initial offensive presence with the Ducks and was moved between the first and fourth lines due to various injuries. Grant surprised the coaching staff with his play while on the top line but struggled to remain on the ice and was a healthy scratch 13 times over a six-week period. He eventually found his role on the Ducks' third-line and responded by producing a career-high 12 goals, 12 assists, and 24 points through 66 games.

==== Pittsburgh Penguins ====
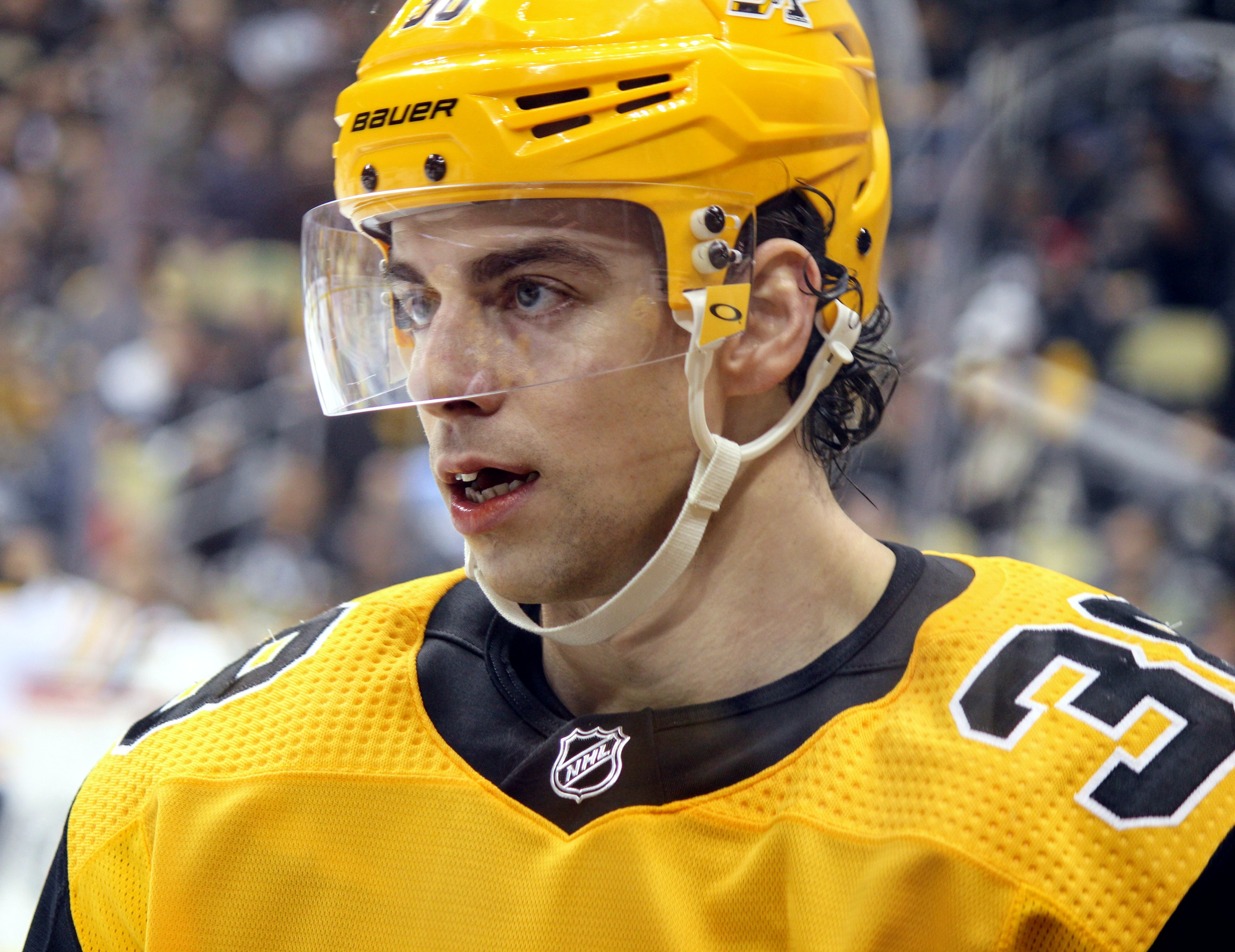
Grant during a game with the Penguins in December 2018.

Having played his first full season in the NHL, Grant left the Ducks as a free agent and agreed to a one-year, $650,000 contract with the Pittsburgh Penguins on July 20, 2018. After attending the Penguins training camp and pre-season, Grant made the Penguins opening night roster to begin the 2018-19 season. However, his stint in the NHL was shortlived as he was assigned to their AHL affiliate, the Wilkes-Barre/Scranton Penguins, to accommodate Tristan Jarry's promotion after scoring in one game. He spent a total of 25 games with the Penguins while filling a bottom-six role but was overshadowed by the Penguins’ depth at center. At the AHL level, Grant played in five games with Wilkes-Barre/Scranton over two different assignments where he tallied four points.

On January 16, 2019, Grant was returned to the Anaheim Ducks after a trade with the Penguins in exchange for Joseph Blandisi.

==== Return to Anaheim and Philadelphia Flyers ====
Upon rejoining the Ducks for the remainder of the 2018–19 season, Grant contributed two goals and nine points through 31 games. At the end of the season, Grant was re-signed by the Ducks to a one-year $700,000 contract extension. In the following 2019–20 season, Grant established a career high 14 goals through 49 games with the Ducks, including recording his first career NHL hat-trick. Despite this, he was dealt at the NHL trade deadline to the Philadelphia Flyers in exchange for Kyle Criscuolo and a 2020 fourth-round pick on February 24, 2020. Grant posted five points through his first seven games with the Flyers before the season was paused due to the COVID-19 pandemic.

During the pause in play, Grant had a difficult time finding rinks available for him to practice and train with numerous teammates. He eventually returned to help the Flyers in the 2020 Stanley Cup playoffs where they swept the Boston Bruins, Tampa Bay Lightning, and Washington Capitals in the Eastern Conference seeding round-robin. Following this, Grant helped the Flyers beat the Montreal Canadiens in six games to moved onto the Eastern Conference semi-finals against the New York Islanders. While the Flyers were eliminated in the semi-finals, Grant finished the post-season with two assists through 15 games.

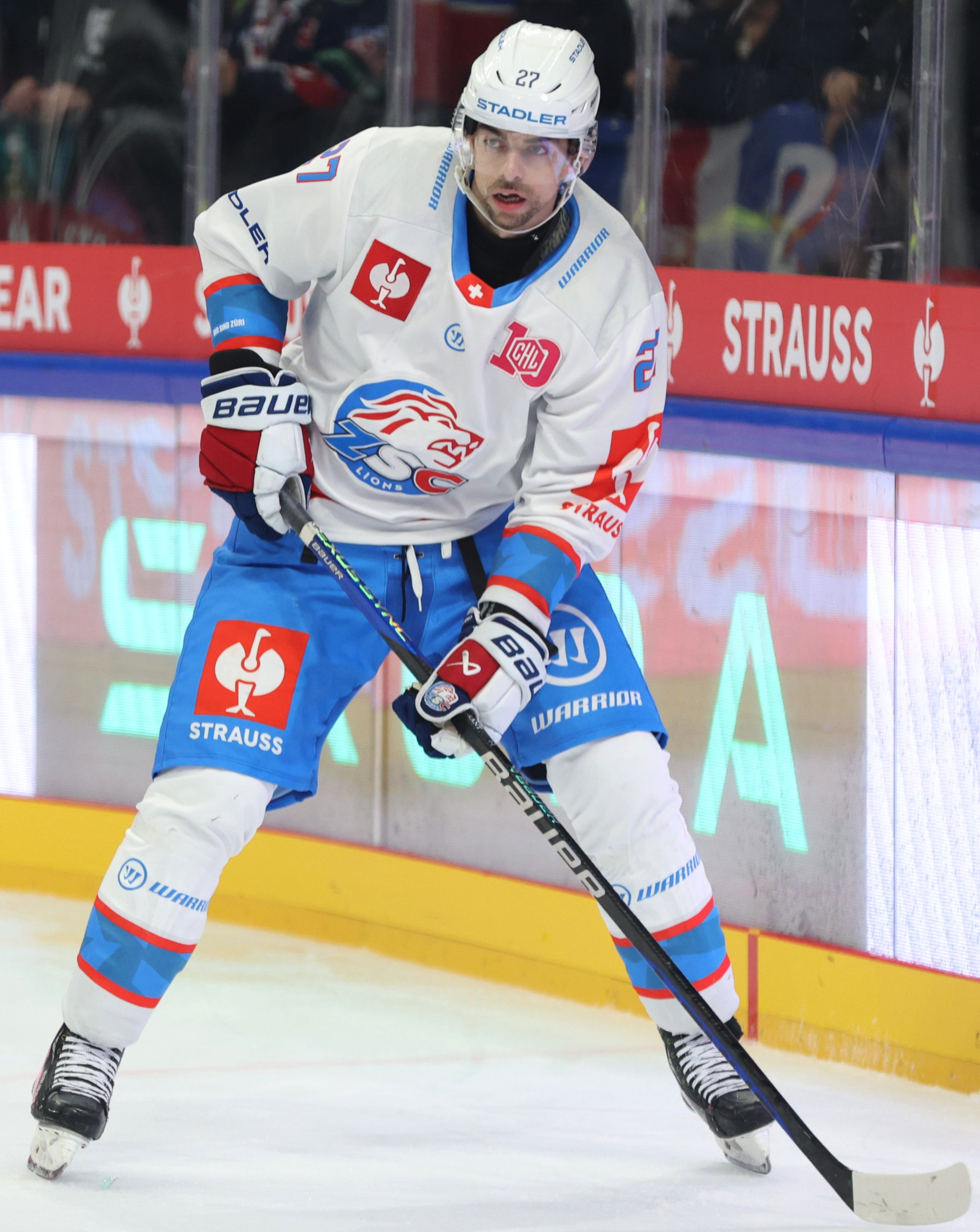
Grant with ZSC Lions in 2024

As a free agent, Grant opted to return for a third stint with the Anaheim Ducks, securing a three-year, $4.5 million contract on October 9, 2020.

==== ZSC Lions ====
Having concluded his three-year contract with the Ducks, Grant left the club as a free agent and opted to sign his first contract abroad by agreeing to a one-year deal with Swiss based ZSC Lions of the National League, on July 20, 2023.

He played 50 games for ZSC Lions in the National League in 2023–24, scoring 18 goals and 39 points. In the playoffs, Grant scored 13 points in 15 games helping ZSC to their 10th Swiss Championship.

In 2024–25, ZSC Lions played in both the National League and the Champions Hockey League. Grant scored 21 goals and 40 points in 47 games for ZSC in the NL, and 4 goals and 7 points in 10 games in the Champions Hockey League. Heading into the National League playoffs, ZSC had the second best record in the league. Grant scored four goals and 13 points in the playoffs, helping ZCS win their second consecutive Swiss Championship. ZSC also won the Champions Hockey League, beating Swedish representative Farjestad BK 2–1 in the final.

== International play ==
Medal record

Ice hockey

Representing Canada West

World Junior A Challenge
Silver medal – second place	2008 Camrose	

As a native of Canada, Grant was chosen to represent Team Canada West at the 2008 World Junior A Challenge where he helped them win a silver medal.

He represented Canada at the 2023 Spengler Cup, where he was named an alternate captain. Grant scored three points in three games in the tournament, including two goals in the semifinal, where Canada lost to HC Dynamo Pardubice.

Grant once again represented Canada as an alternate captain at the 2025 Spengler Cup, notching two assists in two games in the group stage. He missed the quarterfinal game against HC Sparta Praha, where Canada was eliminated from the tournament in a 5–1 loss to the Czech side.

== Career statistics ==
			Regular season					Playoffs
Season	Team	League	GP	G	A	Pts	PIM	GP	G	A	Pts	PIM
2006–07	Abbotsford Pilots	PIJHL	47	31	20	51	42	11	6	5	11	20
2007–08	Langley Chiefs	BCHL	57	24	39	63	44	—	—	—	—	—
2008–09	Langley Chiefs	BCHL	35	25	35	60	22	—	—	—	—	—
2009–10	Michigan State University	CCHA	38	12	18	30	10	—	—	—	—	—
2010–11	Michigan State University	CCHA	38	8	25	33	44	—	—	—	—	—
2010–11	Binghamton Senators	AHL	14	1	5	6	0	7	1	1	2	2
2011–12	Binghamton Senators	AHL	60	8	15	23	26	—	—	—	—	—
2012–13	Binghamton Senators	AHL	63	19	9	28	37	3	0	0	0	6
2012–13	Ottawa Senators	NHL	5	0	0	0	0	—	—	—	—	—
2013–14	Binghamton Senators	AHL	46	12	10	22	30	4	0	1	1	2
2013–14	Ottawa Senators	NHL	20	0	2	2	4	—	—	—	—	—
2014–15	Binghamton Senators	AHL	73	21	17	38	45	—	—	—	—	—
2015–16	Stockton Heat	AHL	36	27	18	45	36	—	—	—	—	—
2015–16	Calgary Flames	NHL	15	0	1	1	2	—	—	—	—	—
2016–17	Buffalo Sabres	NHL	40	0	3	3	19	—	—	—	—	—
2016–17	Nashville Predators	NHL	6	0	1	1	5	—	—	—	—	—
2016–17	Rochester Americans	AHL	23	11	8	19	22	—	—	—	—	—
2017–18	Anaheim Ducks	NHL	66	12	12	24	11	4	0	0	0	0
2018–19	Wilkes-Barre/Scranton Penguins	AHL	5	3	1	4	6	—	—	—	—	—
2018–19	Pittsburgh Penguins	NHL	25	2	3	5	6	—	—	—	—	—
2018–19	Anaheim Ducks	NHL	31	2	7	9	8	—	—	—	—	—
2019–20	Anaheim Ducks	NHL	49	14	6	20	28	—	—	—	—	—
2019–20	Philadelphia Flyers	NHL	7	1	4	5	2	15	0	2	2	8
2020–21	Anaheim Ducks	NHL	46	6	9	15	25	—	—	—	—	—
2021–22	Anaheim Ducks	NHL	71	15	14	29	27	—	—	—	—	—
2022–23	Anaheim Ducks	NHL	46	5	13	18	26	—	—	—	—	—
2023—24	ZSC Lions	NL	50	18	21	39	22	15	9	4	13	6
2024—25	ZSC Lions	NL	47	21	19	40	20	16	4	9	13	42
NHL totals			427	57	75	132	163	19	0	2	2	8

== Awards and honours ==
Award	Year
AHL
Calder Cup (Binghamton Senators)	2011
AHL All-Star Game	2016
NL
Champion (ZSC Lions)	2024, 2025
Champions Hockey League
Champion (ZSC Lions)	2024–25
