= Nick Halloran =

American ice hockey player

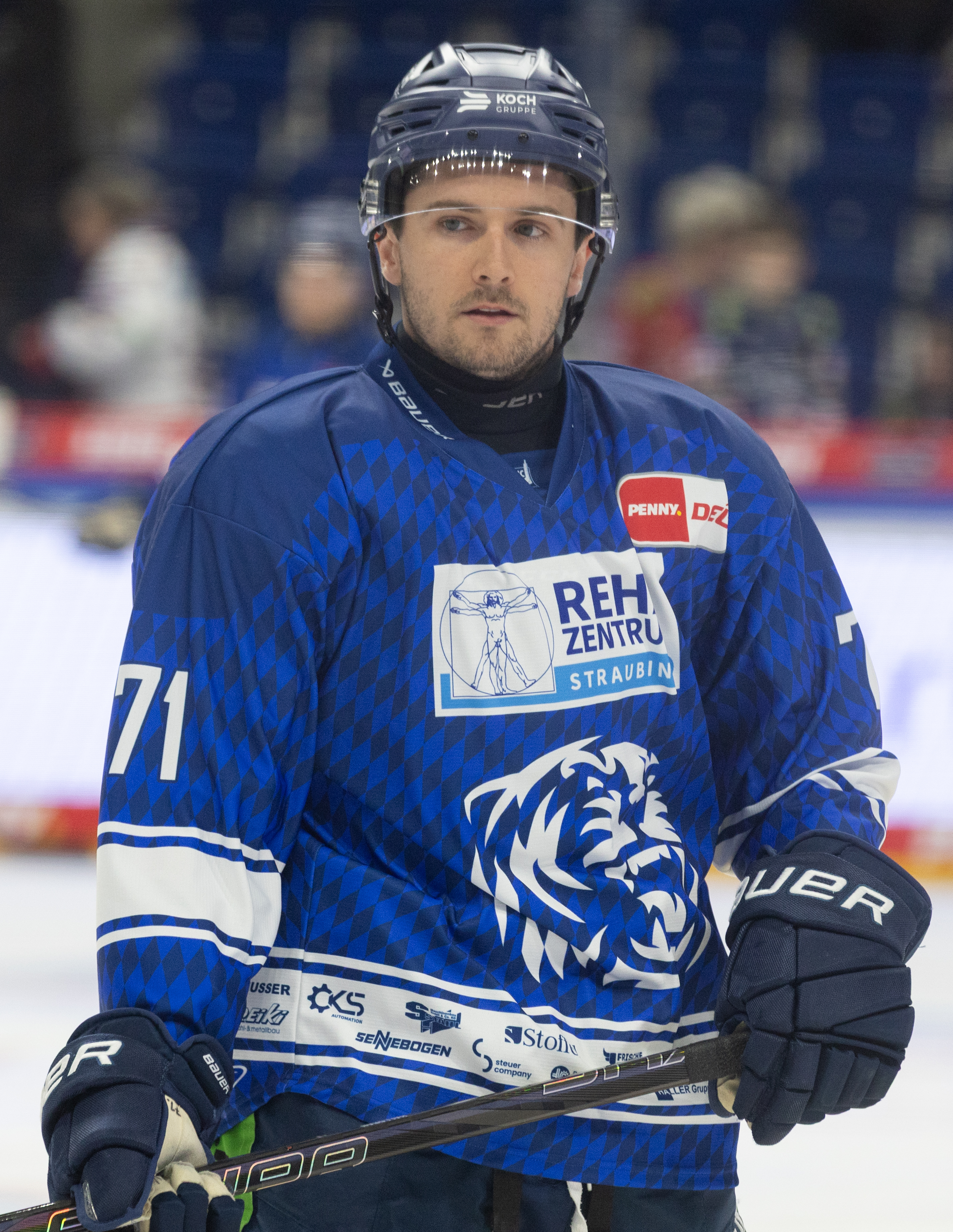
- Halloran in 2026
- Born: May 13, 1997 (age 28) Draper, Utah, U.S.
- Height: 5 ft 10 in (178 cm)
- Weight: 174 lb (79 kg; 12 st 6 lb)
- Position: Right wing
- Shoots: Right
- team Former teams: Straubing Tigers; Tappara; Ontario Reign; SaiPa; Örebro HK; Timrå IK
- NHL draft: Undrafted
- Playing career: 2021–present

Nicholas Halloran (born May 13, 1997) is an American professional ice hockey forward who currently plays for Straubing Tigers in the DEL.

== Early life ==
Halloran was born on May 13, 1997, in Draper, Utah to parents Michael Halloran and Cheryl Gilger.

== Career ==
=== Early career ===
Growing up, Halloran played for the Colorado Thunderbirds and Colorado Rampage 16U AAA in the Tier 1 Elite Hockey League (T1EHL). He made his U15 Midget Minor debut with the Thunderbirds during the 2012–13 season and moved to Colorado with his mother for his first two seasons in the T1EHL. He advanced to the Colorado Rampage 18U AAA during the 2014–15 season where he recorded 26 points in 24 games and earned a selection by the Sioux Falls Stampede in the 2015 United States Hockey League (USHL) Entry Draft. Halloran declined and chose to play with the Trail Smoke Eaters in the British Columbia Hockey League (BCHL) where he led the team with 45 points in 53 regular-season games.

While with the Trail Smoke Eaters, Halloran committed to play NCAA Division 1 ice hockey with the Colorado College Tigers men's ice hockey, following after his brother who also earned a college hockey opportunity after playing in the BCHL. When speaking of his decision to play at Colorado College, he admitted that his years playing with the Thunderbirds and Rampage influenced his choice.

=== Collegiate ===
Halloran played with the Colorado College Tigers from 2016 until 2020 while majoring in economics. He made his collegiate debut on October 14, 2016, against the UMass Lowell River Hawks, where he scored his first goal in an eventual 8–5 loss. Later that month, he was named NCHC Rookie of the Week after scoring three of the team's five goals over a two-game weekend against Boston College and New Hampshire. Halloran ended the season with a selection to the 2016–17 NCHC's Academic All-Conference Team and tied for sixth on the team with five goals in 29 games.

Following his freshman campaign, Halloran proceeded to have a breakout sophomore season while playing on a line with Mason Bergh and Trey Bradley (often called the 13-14-15 line for their uniform numbers). His 45 points placed him third overall in the conference and 15th in the country while also earning him the Thayer Tutt Award as team MVP and M.B. Hopper Award as the team's leading scorer. As a result of his play, Halloran won back-to-back NCHC Player of the Month accolades for December and January. was named a Hobey Baker Award nominee, and became the first Tiger since 2012 to be selected as a Second-team All-America. After his successful season, Tigers coach Mike Haviland estimated that 10 to 15 professional teams took an interest in Halloran and said "we [the team] didn’t know if he’d come back for that junior year." It was later revealed that Halloran had played through a torn labrum and required surgery to remove a bone spur during the offseason.

Leading up to his third year at Colorado College, Halloran was selected for the NCHC Preseason All-Conference Team as voted on by local and select media members. He was also praised by Air Force Falcons coach Frank Serratore who speculated that he would end his collegiate career early to pursue a professional one. This would never come to fruition as he struggled at the beginning of the season and underwent a second surgery in January which cut his season short. Although he finished the season early, Halloran was named to his third Academic All-Conference Team for maintaining a 3.0 cumulative GPA or better during the semesters.

Halloran announced he would rejoin the Tigers for his fourth and final season and said "I definitely feel like a new person. My hip was really bothering me, and it was a tough decision to get it fixed. But ultimately, I believe it was the right one. I’m flying now." Similar to his sophomore season, Halloran meshed well with Chris Wilkie and together they accounted for 41.6% of their team's goal total by January. As a result of their outstanding play, both Wilkie and Halloran were nominated for the 2020 Hobey Baker Award. Due to the COVID-19 pandemic, his senior season was cut short and he moved his classes online so he could return home.

=== Professional ===
Halloran concluded his collegiate career by signing an American Hockey League (AHL) contract with the Ontario Reign for the 2020–21 season on May 14, 2020. When asked what his first purchase would be with his first check, Halloran said he would open a savings account. With the season shortened due to the pandemic, Halloran made just 15 appearances, collecting 8 points, in his lone season with the Reign.

As a free agent, Halloran embarked on a European career by splitting the following 2021–22 season between Finnish club, SaiPa of the Liiga and Swedish club, Örebro HK of the SHL.

In showing his offensive acumen, Halloran as a free agent opted to continue in the SHL, securing a one-year contract with Timrå IK on May 18, 2022. In the 2022–23 season, Halloran contributed offensively for Timrå in adding 7 goals and 15 points in 27 appearances. On January 24, 2023, Halloran opted to leave the club and sign for the remainder of the season with Swedish second tier club, Modo Hockey of the HockeyAllsvenskan.

== Career statistics ==
			Regular season					Playoffs
Season	Team	League	GP	G	A	Pts	PIM	GP	G	A	Pts	PIM
2014–15	Colorado Rampage	T1EHL	24	11	15	26	14	4	0	0	0	2
2015–16	Trail Smoke Eaters	BCHL	53	21	24	45	24	—	—	—	—	—
2016–17	Colorado College	NCHC	29	5	4	9	22	—	—	—	—	—
2017–18	Colorado College	NCHC	37	19	26	45	33	—	—	—	—	—
2018–19	Colorado College	NCHC	20	4	9	13	8	—	—	—	—	—
2019–20	Colorado College	NCHC	33	12	18	30	12	—	—	—	—	—
2020–21	Ontario Reign	AHL	15	1	7	8	6	—	—	—	—	—
2021–22	SaiPa	Liiga	25	7	10	17	16	—	—	—	—	—
2021–22	Örebro HK	SHL	20	6	6	12	10	8	0	1	1	6
2022–23	Timrå IK	SHL	27	7	8	15	10	—	—	—	—	—
2023–24	Tappara	Liiga	60	19	24	43	43	16	3	8	11	2
Liiga totals			85	26	34	60	59	16	3	8	11	2
SHL totals			47	13	14	27	20	8	0	1	1	6

== Awards and honors ==
Award	Year	Ref
College
NCHC First All-Star Team	2018	
NCAA West Second All-American Team	2018	

Awards and achievements
Preceded by Ben Blacker	NCHC Three Stars Award; 2017–18	Succeeded by Hunter Shepard
