= Sheldon Rempal =

Canadian ice hockey player (born 1995)

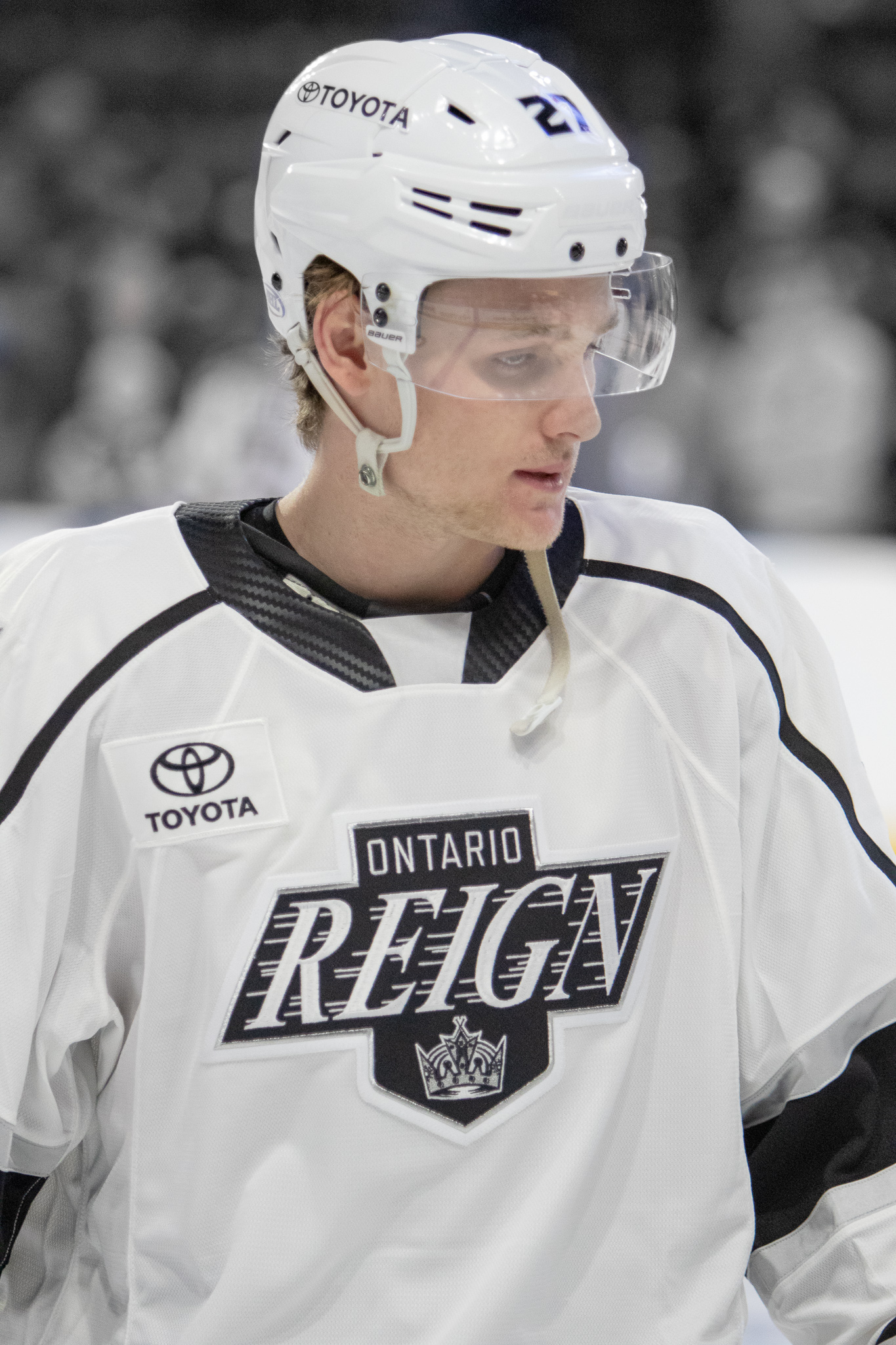
- Rempal with the Ontario Reign in 2019
- Born: August 7, 1995 (age 31) Calgary, Alberta, Canada
- Height: 5 ft 10 in (178 cm)
- Weight: 165 lb (75 kg; 11 st 11 lb)
- Position: Right wing
- Shoots: Right
- KHL team Former teams: Salavat Yulaev Ufa; Los Angeles Kings; Carolina Hurricanes; Vancouver Canucks; Vegas Golden Knights
- NHL draft: Undrafted
- Playing career: 2018–present

Sheldon Rempal (born August 7, 1995) is a Canadian professional ice hockey winger for Salavat Yulaev Ufa of the Kontinental Hockey League (KHL). Prior to turning professional, Rempal played two seasons with Clarkson University where he was named to the NCAA (East) Second All-American Team, NCAA (ECAC) All-Tournament Team, and NCAA (ECAC) First All-Star Team. Rempal has previously played in the National Hockey League (NHL) with the Los Angeles Kings, Carolina Hurricanes, Vancouver Canucks, and Vegas Golden Knights.

== Playing career ==
Rempal played three seasons with the Nanaimo Clippers in the British Columbia Hockey League. At the conclusion of the 2015–16 season, he was named to the BCHL 1st Team All-Stars. While playing for the Clippers, Rempal committed to Clarkson University. He concluded his time with the BCHL playing in 167 games from 2013–2016.

Rempal played two seasons with Clarkson University while majoring in business. In his freshman year, Rempal was named to the NCAA (ECAC) All-Rookie Team. In his sophomore year, he was named to the NCAA (East) Second All-American Team, NCAA (ECAC) All-Tournament Team, and NCAA (ECAC) First All-Star Team.

As an unrestricted free agent, Rempal signed a two-year, entry-level contract with the Los Angeles Kings on March 30, 2018. Rempal attended the Kings training camp prior to the 2018–19 season but was reassigned to their American Hockey League (AHL) affiliate, the Ontario Reign, on September 17. Rempal began the 2018–19 season in the AHL, where he recorded eight points in four games, but was recalled to the NHL on October 17. He made his NHL debut the following day on October 18, in a 7–2 loss to the New York Islanders. He played 13:06 minutes of ice time in his debut. Rempal was re-assigned to Ontario Reign on October 27 after playing in three NHL games. On December 3, Rempal was named the AHL Rookie of the Month for November after he collected 12 points in nine games with the Ontario Reign. He was later selected to the Pacific Division All-Stars for the 2019 American Hockey League All-Star Classic.

At the conclusion of his entry-level contract, Rempal as an impending restricted free agent was not tendered a qualifying offer by the Kings and was released to free agency. On October 16, 2020, Rempal was signed to a one-year, two-way, league minimum contract with the Carolina Hurricanes. In the pandemic delayed 2020–21 season, Rempal appeared in three games with the Hurricanes before he was assigned to AHL affiliate, the Chicago Wolves for the remainder of his contract.

As a free agent from the Hurricanes, Rempal was signed to a one-year, two-way contract with the Vancouver Canucks on July 28, 2021.

On July 13, 2022, Rempal left the Canucks and was signed to a two-year, two-way contract with the Vegas Golden Knights. After spending all but one game of the 2022–23 season with Vegas' AHL affiliate, the Henderson Silver Knights, Rempal was recalled to Vegas on January 18, 2024, after recording a four-goal game for Henderson the day before. Rempal then recorded his first career NHL goal with Vegas on January 23, scoring on the power play against Ilya Sorokin of the New York Islanders. Just three days later against the New York Rangers, Rempal added his second career goal, deflecting a shot from Paul Cotter past Rangers goaltender Igor Shesterkin.

After the conclusion of his contract with Vegas, Rempal went overseas, signing a one-year contract with Salavat Yulaev Ufa of the Kontinental Hockey League on July 2, 2024. After his lone season in Russia, Rempal returned to North America, signing a one-year contract with the Washington Capitals on July 7, 2025. On the commencement of the 2025–26 season, Rempal having cleared waivers was re-assigned to AHL affiliate, the Hershey Bears. He registered 4 appearances and posted 2 points with the Bears before he was placed on unconditional waivers in order for a mutual termination of his contract with the Capitals on October 23, 2025. Two days later, on October 27, Rempal returned to Salavat Yulaev Ufa on a one-year contract.

== Career statistics ==
			Regular season					Playoffs
Season	Team	League	GP	G	A	Pts	PIM	GP	G	A	Pts	PIM
2013–14	Nanaimo Clippers	BCHL	58	22	28	50	30	5	3	1	4	0
2014–15	Nanaimo Clippers	BCHL	53	29	24	53	52	23	7	5	12	14
2015–16	Nanaimo Clippers	BCHL	56	59	51	110	88	14	9	14	23	8
2016–17	Clarkson University	ECAC	39	11	12	23	14	—	—	—	—	—
2017–18	Clarkson University	ECAC	39	23	23	46	34	—	—	—	—	—
2018–19	Ontario Reign	AHL	59	15	25	40	25	—	—	—	—	—
2018–19	Los Angeles Kings	NHL	7	0	0	0	0	—	—	—	—	—
2019–20	Ontario Reign	AHL	56	4	17	21	44	—	—	—	—	—
2020–21	Carolina Hurricanes	NHL	3	0	0	0	0	—	—	—	—	—
2020–21	Chicago Wolves	AHL	25	4	10	14	6	—	—	—	—	—
2021–22	Abbotsford Canucks	AHL	55	33	36	69	46	2	1	1	2	0
2021–22	Vancouver Canucks	NHL	1	0	0	0	0	—	—	—	—	—
2022–23	Henderson Silver Knights	AHL	70	25	38	63	50	—	—	—	—	—
2022–23	Vegas Golden Knights	NHL	1	0	0	0	0	—	—	—	—	—
2023–24	Henderson Silver Knights	AHL	63	27	18	45	22	—	—	—	—	—
2023–24	Vegas Golden Knights	NHL	9	2	1	3	4	—	—	—	—	—
2024–25	Salavat Yulaev Ufa	KHL	68	31	30	61	12	19	8	13	21	14
2025–26	Hershey Bears	AHL	4	1	1	2	2	—	—	—	—	—
2025–26	Salavat Yulaev Ufa	KHL	38	15	31	46	38	10	3	5	8	6
NHL totals			21	2	1	3	4	—	—	—	—	—
KHL totals			106	46	61	107	50	29	11	18	29	20

== Awards and honours ==
Award	Year	Ref
BCHL
BCHL 1st Team All-Stars	2016	
College
NCAA (ECAC) All-Rookie Team	2017	
NCAA (East) Second All-American Team	2018	
NCAA (ECAC) All-Tournament Team	2018	
NCAA (ECAC) First All-Star Team	2018	
AHL
Rookie of the Month (November)	2018	
All-Star Game	2019	
