= 2015–16 BCHL season =

2015–16 BCHL Season
- League: British Columbia Hockey League
- Sport: Hockey
- Duration: Regular season 11 Sep. 2015 – 28 Feb. 2016; Playoffs; 4 Mar. – 23 Apr. 2016
- Teams: 17

Regular season
- Season champions: Penticton Vees
- Season MVP: Tyson Jost (Penticton Vees)
- Top scorer: Scott Conway (Penticton Vees)

Fred Page Cup
- Champions: West Kelowna Warriors
- Runners-up: Chilliwack Chiefs

BCHL seasons
- 2014–15 BCHL 2016–17 BCHL

The 2015–16 BCHL season was the 54th season of the British Columbia Hockey League. (BCHL) The seventeen teams from the Interior, Island and Mainland divisions played 58-game schedules, featuring the 2015 BCHL Showcase, hosted in Chilliwack, shortly after the start of the season from September 24 to 27, 2015.

In March, the top teams from each division played for the Fred Page Cup, the BCHL Championship. The league champion then moved on to compete in the Western Canadian Junior A championship, the Western Canada Cup, in Estevan, Saskatchewan. If successful against the winners of the Alberta Junior Hockey League, Saskatchewan Junior Hockey League, Manitoba Junior Hockey League and the 2016 Western Canada Cup hosts, the Estevan Bruins, the champion and runner-up would then move on to play for the Canadian Junior Hockey League championship, the Royal Bank Cup, in Lloydmyinster, Saskatchewan

== League changes ==
Team map, 2015–16 BCHL season
Island Division
Mainland Division
Interior Division
- Wenatchee Wild joined the league from the North American Hockey League and began play in the Mainland Division.

== Standings ==
Note: GP = Games Played, W = Wins, L = Losses, T = Ties, OTL = Overtime Losses, Pts = Points

Mainland Division
Team	Centre	W–L–T-OTL	Points
Chilliwack Chiefs	Chilliwack, BC	38-13-3-4	83
Wenatchee Wild	Wenatchee, Washington, USA	34-16-4-4	76
Langley Rivermen	Langley Township, BC	31-22-2-3	67
Coquitlam Express	Coquitlam, BC	22-29-1-6	51
Prince George Spruce Kings	Prince George, BC	14-38-2-4	34
Surrey Eagles	White Rock, BC	7-48-2-1	17
Island Division
Team	Centre	W–L–T-OTL	Points
Nanaimo Clippers	Nanaimo, BC	38-18-1-1	78
Powell River Kings	Powell River, BC	33-20-1-4	71
Cowichan Valley Capitals	Duncan, BC	27-25-3-3	60
Alberni Valley Bulldogs	Port Alberni, BC	23-27-4-4	54
Victoria Grizzlies	Victoria, BC	24-30-0-4	52
Interior Division
Team	Centre	W–L–T-OTL	Points
Penticton Vees	Penticton, BC	50-7-1-0	101
West Kelowna Warriors	West Kelowna, BC	38-17-1-2	79
Salmon Arm Silverbacks	Salmon Arm, BC	29-20-4-5	67
Vernon Vipers	Vernon, BC	24-31-0-3	51
Merritt Centennials	Merritt, BC	23-30-1-4	51
Trail Smoke Eaters	Trail, BC	23-33-0-2	48

- Standings listed on the official league website.

== 2015–16 BCHL Fred Page Cup Playoffs ==
=== Division playoffs ===
Mainland Division Semi-final
1	Chilliwack	4
4	Coquitlam	0
2	Wenatchee	4
3	Langley	1

Mainland Division Final
1	Chilliwack	4
2	Wenatchee	1

Island Division Semi-final
1	Nanaimo	4
4	Alberni Valley	1
2	Powell River	4
3	Cowichan Valley	2

Island Division Final
1	Nanaimo	4
2	Powell River	0

Interior Division Semi-finals
1	Penticton	4
4	Vernon	1
2	West Kelowna	4
3	Salmon Arm	2

Interior Division Finals
1	Penticton	2
2	West Kelowna	4

=== Semi-final Round Robin ===
The 2016 semifinal simplifies the double round robin concept with the "Three Wins To Get In" format. The first two teams to three wins advances to the final with the first team to reach three wins getting home ice advantage, while the remaining team is eliminated.

In case of a tie, the two tied teams will play a one game playoff to determine the second spot in the finals. In a three way tie, the teams will face off in a Page playoff format, starting with Chilliwack vs. West Kelowna. The loser of that game would play Nanaimo, and the winners from both games advance to the final.

Team	Wins
Chilliwack	3
West Kelowna	3
Nanaimo	2

=== Fred Page Cup Final ===
Final
1	Chilliwack	2
2	West Kelowna	4

==== (1) Chilliwack Chiefs vs. (2) West Kelowna Warriors ====
April 15	Chilliwack Chiefs	0 – 2	West Kelowna Warriors	Prospera Centre
No scoring		First period	Kylar Hope (13) - 18:46
No scoring		Second period	Kyle Marino (4) - 12:58
No scoring		Third period	No scoring
Aidan Pelino (23 saves / 25 shots)		Goalie stats	Matthew Greenfield (37 saves / 37 shots)

April 16	Chilliwack Chiefs	3 – 6	West Kelowna Warriors	Prospera Centre
1:31 - pp - Jordan Kawaguchi (10)		First period	No scoring
11:46 - Aaron O'Neill (3); 19:06 - Ryan Forbes (5)		Second period	Nick Rutigliano (3) - 4:52; Jonathan Desbiens (13) - pp - 6:18; Jake LeBrun (3) - pp - 13:39
No scoring		Third period	Jonathan Desbiens (14) - pp - 8:35; Brett Mennear (2) - en - 17:42; Kyle Marino (5) - en - 18:28
Aidan Pelino (29 saves / 33 shots)		Goalie stats	Matthew Greenfield (23 saves / 26 shots)

April 18	West Kelowna Warriors	1 – 3	Chilliwack Chiefs	Royal LePage Place
No scoring		First period	No scoring
8:33 - Garrett Forster (5)		Second period	Connor McCarthy (1) - 2:06; Darien Craighead (6) - 10:32
No scoring		Third period	Jordan Kawaguchi (11) - 8:40
Matthew Greenfield (24 saves / 27 shots)		Goalie stats	Aidan Pelino (26 saves / 27 shots)

April 19	West Kelowna Warriors	3 – 2	OT	Chilliwack Chiefs	Royal LePage Place
16:17 - pp - Rylan Yaremko (2)		First period		No scoring
10:43 - pp - Kyle Marino (6)		Second period		Zach Giuttari (1) - 6:06
No scoring		Third period		Darien Craighead (7) - 1:09
16:28 - Jake LeBrun (4)		First overtime period		No scoring
Matthew Greenfield (34 saves / 36 shots)		Goalie stats		Aidan Pelino (38 saves / 41 shots)

April 22	Chilliwack Chiefs	5 – 2	West Kelowna Warriors	Prospera Centre
10:05 - pp - Vimal Sukumaran (6)		First period	Kylar Hope (14) - pp - 11:40
12:08 - pp - Ryan Forbes (6); 16:36 - pp - Jordan Kawaguchi (12)		Second period	No scoring
17:19 - en - Darien Craighead (8); 18:56 - pp - Taylor Allan (2)		Third period	Tyler Anderson (1) - sh - 19:02
Aidan Pelino (21 saves / 22 shots); Matteo Esposito (0 saves / 1 shot)		Goalie stats	Matthew Greenfield (7 saves / 8 shots); Keelan Williams (20 saves / 23 shots)

April 13	West Kelowna Warriors	4 – 2	Chilliwack Chiefs	Royal LePage Place
1:57 - pp - Garrett Forster (6); 9:56 - Kyle Marino (7)		First period	Ryan Forbes (7) - pp - 3:36
No scoring		Second period	No scoring
6:54 - pp - Kylar Hope (15); 11:03 - Jonathan Desbiens (15)		Third period	Vimal Sukumaran (7) - 11:55
Keelan Williams (36 saves / 38 shots)		Goalie stats	Aidan Pelino (33 saves / 37 shots)

West Kelowna wins series 4 – 2

=== 2016 Western Canada Cup ===
The Fred Page Cup Champion West Kelowna Warriors advanced to the 2016 Western Canada Cup in Estevan, Saskatchewan where they will play for one of two spots in the 2016 Royal Bank Cup, where they finished first. They would go on to win the first national championship in franchise history.

== Scoring leaders ==
GP = Games Played, G = Goals, A = Assists, P = Points, PIM = Penalties In Minutes

Player	Team	GP	G	A	Pts	PIM
Scott Conway	Penticton Vees	56	56	50	116	52
Sheldon Rempal	Nanaimo Clippers	56	59	51	110	88
Tyson Jost	Penticton Vees	48	42	62	104	43
Devin Brosseau	Nanaimo Clippers	56	27	57	84	108
Jordan Kawaguchi	Chilliwack Chiefs	56	45	38	83	29
Johnathan Desbiens	West Kelowna Warriors	58	44	39	83	48
Matthew Hoover	Nanaimo Clippers	57	38	43	81	100
Colton Kerfoot	Coquitlam Express	58	24	55	79	14
Colin Grannary	Merritt Centennials	55	28	48	76	44
Kylar Hope	West Kelowna Warriors	58	28	46	74	62

== Leading goaltenders ==
Note: GP = Games Played, Mins = Minutes Played, W = Wins, L = Losses, T = Ties, GA = Goals Against, SO = Shutouts, Sv% = Save Percentage, GAA = Goals Against Average. Regulation losses and overtime losses have been combined for total losses.

Player	Team	GP	Mins	W	L	T	GA	SO	Sv%	GAA
Zachary Driscoll	Penticton Vees	26	1483	21	4	0	47	4	0.933	1.90
Anthony Brodeur	Penticton Vees	33	1927	28	2	1	64	3	0.931	1.99
Jeff Smith	Powell River Kings	42	2348	25	12	1	97	5	0.927	2.48
Aiden Pelino	Chilliwack Chiefs	38	2127	22	11	2	90	2	0.909	2.54
Chase Perry	Wenatchee Wild	43	2431	23	16	2	106	5	0.892	2.62

== Award winners ==
- Brett Hull Trophy (Top Scorer): Scott Conway (Penticton)
- Best Defenceman: Dante Fabbro (Penticton)
- Bruce Allison Memorial Trophy (Rookie of the Year): Vimal Sukumaran (Chilliwack)
- Bob Fenton Trophy (Most Sportsmanlike): Colton Kerfoot (Coquitlam)
- Top Goaltender: Zachary Driscoll (Penticton)
- Wally Forslund Memorial Trophy (Best Goaltending Duo): Zachary Driscoll & Anthony Brodeur (Penticton)
- Vern Dye Memorial Trophy (regular-season MVP): Tyson Jost (Penticton)
- Joe Tennant Memorial Trophy (Coach of the Year): Fred Harbinson (Penticton)
- Ron Boileau Memorial Trophy (Best Regular Season Record): Penticton Vees
- Fred Page Cup (League Champions): West Kelowna Warriors

== Players selected in 2016 NHL entry draft ==
- Rd1: 10 Tyson Jost: Colorado Avalanche (Penticton Vees)
- Rd1: 17 Dante Fabbro: Nashville Predators (Penticton Vees)
- Rd1: 20 Dennis Cholowski: Detroit Red Wings (Chilliwack Chiefs)

== See also ==
- 2015 in ice hockey
- 2016 in ice hockey
