= Sven Andrighetto =

Swiss ice hockey player (born 1993)

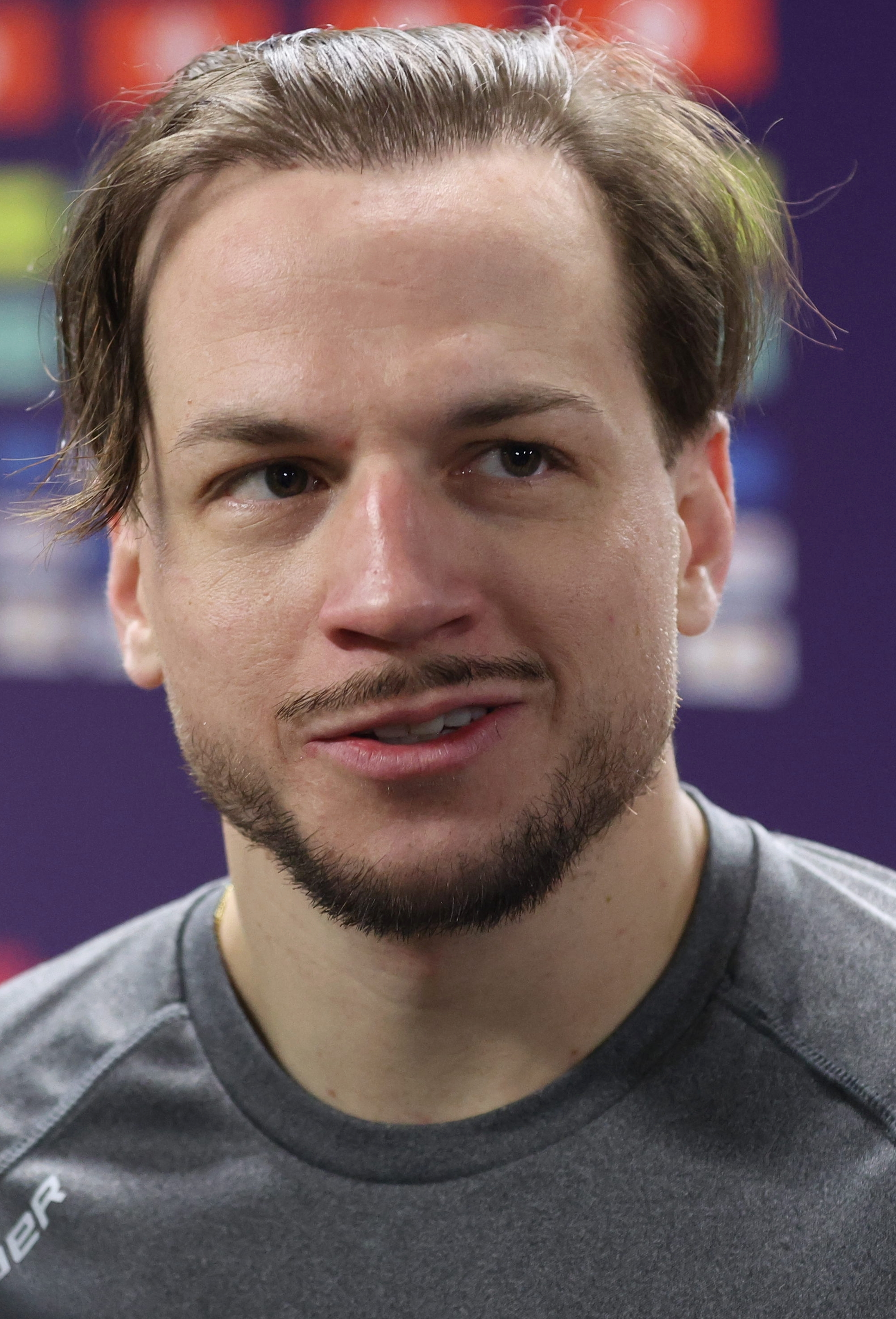
- Andrighetto with the ZSC Lions in 2024
- Born: 21 March 1993 (age 33) Sumiswald, Switzerland
- Height: 5 ft 10 in (178 cm)
- Weight: 180 lb (82 kg; 12 st 12 lb)
- Position: Forward
- Shoots: Left
- NL team Former teams: ZSC Lions; Montreal Canadiens; Colorado Avalanche; Avangard Omsk
- National team: Switzerland
- NHL draft: 86th overall, 2013; Montreal Canadiens
- Playing career: 2010–present

Sven Andrighetto (born 21 March 1993) is a Swiss professional ice hockey player who is a forward for the ZSC Lions of the National League (NL). He was selected in the third round, 86th overall, by the Montreal Canadiens in the 2013 NHL entry draft. Andrighetto has also previously played for the Colorado Avalanche and Avangard Omsk.

== Playing career ==
=== Junior ===
The Rouyn-Noranda Huskies selected him in the first round, 11th overall, of the 2011 Quebec Major Junior Hockey League (QMJHL) Import Draft from the GCK Lions of the Swiss National League B (NLB), Switzerland's second-tier professional league. In the 2010–11 season while playing for the Lions, he was selected to represent Switzerland at the 2011 World Junior tournament. Playing 36 games for GCK, he recorded 23 points (11 goals and 12 assists) and 20 penalty minutes. Loaned to eventual NLB champion EHC Visp, he was scoreless in two regular-season games, adding one goal, two assists, and 12 penalty minutes in 17 playoff games.

For the 2011–12 QMJHL season, Andrighetto moved to Canada to play in the QMJHL. Andrighetto had previously played in Canada at the 2006 Quebec International Pee-Wee Hockey Tournament with a youth team from Zürich. Despite his small size, Andrighetto managed to score 74 points (36 goals and 38 assists), along with 50 penalty minutes. He was a –23 in plus/minus despite his high scoring. The Huskies made it to the playoffs but lost to the Shawinigan Cataractes in a four-game sweep. Andrighetto had two assists and four penalty minutes in those four games.

Andrighetto returned to Rouyn-Noranda and the Huskies for the 2012–13 QMJHL season. He had a successful season in his second year in North America, playing in 53 games for the team but recording 98 points (31 goals and 67 assists) to finish sixth in regular season scoring in the QMJHL, with 45 penalty minutes as well as a +25 plus/minus rating. With the Huskies once again in the playoffs, they made a run to the semi-finals, falling to the Halifax Mooseheads. Andrighetto played in all of 14 games, with eight goals and 22 assists for 30 points with only 14 penalty minutes.

Andrighetto was entering his final year of eligibility for the 2013 NHL entry draft; he was 20 years of age when the draft came, held in Newark, New Jersey. The Montreal Canadiens held the 86th pick in the third round of the draft and made him the second Swiss player selected (and the first forward hailing from the country), behind Mirco Müller, whom the San Jose Sharks took with the 18th pick.

=== Professional ===
==== Montreal Canadiens ====
On 15 July 2013, the Canadiens signed Andrighetto to a three-year, entry-level contract, detailed to a two-way deal, worth $625,000 if Andrighetto played in the NHL and $70,000 if he played in the American Hockey League (AHL). The contract also included a $75,000 signing bonus.

Andrighetto reported to the AHL's Hamilton Bulldogs for the 2013–14 season, his rookie campaign in the AHL. He scored 44 points (17 goals and 27 assists) in 64 games played and added 40 penalty minutes with a –4 plus-minus rating.

Unable to make the Canadiens out of training camp and pre-season, Andrighetto returned to the Bulldogs for the 2014–15 season. He contributed a goal and two assists in a game on 2 December 2014 against the Adirondack Flames at the Glens Falls Civic Center. Recalled by the Canadiens in December, he made his NHL debut in a 4–1 loss to the Dallas Stars on 6 December, recording his first goal with assists from Tomáš Plekanec and Jiří Sekáč. He registered a point in his first three games to become the first Hab to do so since Pierre Mondou in 1978.

Andrighetto was assigned to begin the 2015–16 season with the Canadiens' new AHL affiliate, the St. John's IceCaps. On 20 November 2015, he was recalled to Montreal for the remainder of the season after producing 23 points in 26 games. After that, he enjoyed the most productive period in his career, scoring seven goals and 17 points in 40 games.

Andrighetto had a slow start at training camp before the 2016–17 season and was reassigned to the IceCaps. Scoring at more than a point-per-game pace in the AHL, Andrighetto earned another recall to Montreal.

==== Colorado Avalanche ====
Struggling to secure a defined role in the team and having contributed only 8 points in 27 games, Andrighetto was traded by the Canadiens at the trade deadline on 1 March 2017 to the Colorado Avalanche in exchange for Andreas Martinsen. Andrighetto became the first Swiss skater to appear for the franchise when he made his debut at the Pepsi Center in a 3–0 shutout defeat to the St. Louis Blues on 5 March 2017. He recorded his first point in his second game with the Avalanche when he contributed an assist toward their 3–1 victory over the Carolina Hurricanes. On 11 March 2017, he scored his first goal for the Avalanche in a 4–2 defeat to the Ottawa Senators. Given an extended opportunity in a scoring role on a line with Nathan MacKinnon and Mikko Rantanen, Andrighetto blossomed to lead the Avalanche in scoring through the month of March and finish the season with 16 points in 19 games.

Protected in the 2017 NHL Expansion Draft, Andrighetto agreed to a two-year, $2.8 million contract extension with Colorado on 28 June 2017. After his first training camp with the Avalanche, Andrighetto began the 2017–18 season on Colorado's top two scoring lines, collecting his first goal and assist in the third game of the season in a 4–0 victory against the Boston Bruins on 9 October 2017. After collecting 12 points in his first 16 games, Andrighetto slowed offensively before suffering a leg injury against the New York Islanders on 31 December 2017. After missing 28 games, Andrighetto returned to the lineup on 8 March 2018 against the Columbus Blue Jackets. Playing in a reduced role, he appeared in a further eight games before suffering a re-occurrence of his lingering leg injury, missing three games. In his first game back, Andrighetto scored two goals in a 5–0 win over the Chicago Blackhawks on 30 March 2018. Helping the Avalanche reach the Stanley Cup playoffs for the first time in four years, Andrighetto finished with eight goals and 22 points in 50 games. He made his playoff debut in the first-round series against the Nashville Predators. He scored his first playoff goal, staving off elimination for the Avalanche in a 2–1 road victory in Game 5 on 21 April 2018. He finished with one point in six games in the playoffs.

In his third season with the Avalanche, Andrighetto began the 2018–19 season on the injured reserve after suffering a leg injury during a pre-season game against the Dallas Stars on 26 September 2018. He made his season debut in the Avalanche's seventh game of the season against the New Jersey Devils, scoring a goal in a 5-3 victory on 19 October 2018. Playing in a top 9 role, he appeared in just six games before he was returned to the injured reserve with a week-to-week lower-body injury on 30 October 2018. Upon his return to health, Andrighetto's missed time affected his role, receiving fourth-line minutes and the occasional healthy scratch. Despite averaging just over 11 minutes time-on-ice, Andrighetto produced seven goals and 17 points in 64 games with the Avalanche. In the post-season, Andrighetto was used as the team's first reserve forward, drawing into the lineup on the fourth line in game three of a first-round series against the Calgary Flames on 15 April 2019. He finished scoreless in 5 playoff games before the Avalanche were defeated in the Western Conference Semi-finals against the San Jose Sharks.

As an impending restricted free agent, Andrighetto's tenure with Colorado ended after he was not tendered a qualifying offer on 25 June 2019.

==== Avangard Omsk ====
As a free agent with minimal multi-term offers from the NHL, Andrighetto opted to leave North America in agreeing to a long-rumoured two-year contract with Russian club, Avangard Omsk of the Kontinental Hockey League (KHL), on 9 July 2019. In his debut season in the KHL, Andrighetto began the 2019–20 season in a top-six role. Unable to increase his offensive influence from the NHL, Andrighetto contributed 13 goals and 27 points in 56 regular season games. He added two assists in Avangard's upset first-round defeat to Salavat Yulaev Ufa in six games.

Exactly one year after he signed with Avangard, Andrighetto opted to end his tenure with the club by mutually terminating the remaining year of his contract on 9 July 2020.

==== ZSC Lions ====
On 15 July 2020, Andrighetto officially returned to Switzerland and agreed to a five-year contract worth CHF 4 million with the ZSC Lions of the National League (NL).

== International play ==
Medal record

Representing Switzerland

Ice hockey

World Championships
Silver medal – second place	2018 Denmark	
Silver medal – second place	2024 Czechia	
Silver medal – second place	2025 Sweden/Denmark	
Silver medal – second place	2026 Switzerland	

He represented Switzerland at the 2024 IIHF World Championship and won a silver medal.

== Career statistics ==
=== Regular season and playoffs ===
			Regular season					Playoffs
Season	Team	League	GP	G	A	Pts	PIM	GP	G	A	Pts	PIM
2008–09	ZSC Lions	SUI U17	28	14	11	25	38	10	3	2	5	8
2009–10	ZSC Lions	SUI U17	22	24	31	55	14	10	16	8	24	18
2009–10	GCK Lions	SUI U20	14	3	4	7	4	—	—	—	—	—
2010–11	GCK Lions	NLB	36	11	12	23	20	—	—	—	—	—
2010–11	EHC Visp	NLB	2	0	0	0	0	17	1	2	3	4
2011–12	Rouyn–Noranda Huskies	QMJHL	62	36	38	74	50	4	0	2	2	4
2012–13	Rouyn–Noranda Huskies	QMJHL	53	31	67	98	45	14	8	22	30	14
2013–14	Hamilton Bulldogs	AHL	64	17	27	44	40	—	—	—	—	—
2014–15	Montreal Canadiens	NHL	12	2	1	3	0	—	—	—	—	—
2014–15	Hamilton Bulldogs	AHL	60	14	29	43	42	—	—	—	—	—
2015–16	Montreal Canadiens	NHL	44	7	10	17	6	—	—	—	—	—
2015–16	St. John's IceCaps	AHL	26	10	13	23	22	—	—	—	—	—
2016–17	Montreal Canadiens	NHL	27	2	6	8	4	—	—	—	—	—
2016–17	Colorado Avalanche	NHL	19	5	11	16	8	—	—	—	—	—
2016–17	St. John's IceCaps	AHL	20	8	14	22	8	—	—	—	—	—
2017–18	Colorado Avalanche	NHL	50	8	14	22	10	6	1	0	1	6
2018–19	Colorado Avalanche	NHL	64	7	10	17	14	5	0	0	0	2
2019–20	Avangard Omsk	KHL	56	13	14	27	22	6	0	2	2	0
2020–21	ZSC Lions	NL	52	27	28	55	18	8	3	5	8	31
2021–22	ZSC Lions	NL	47	19	19	38	33	18	6	11	17	4
2022–23	ZSC Lions	NL	35	11	12	23	24	9	3	3	6	6
2023–24	ZSC Lions	NL	40	13	18	31	8	15	3	11	14	4
2024–25	ZSC Lions	NL	45	20	19	39	12	16	9	13	22	20
2025–26	ZSC Lions	NL	41	17	24	41	24	3	2	4	6	0
NHL totals			216	31	52	83	42	11	1	0	1	8
KHL totals			56	13	14	27	22	6	0	2	2	0
NL totals			260	107	120	227	119	69	26	47	73	65

=== International ===
Year	Team	Event	Result	GP	G	A	Pts	PIM
2010	Switzerland	U18	5th	6	0	3	3	2
2011	Switzerland	U18	7th	6	3	2	5	8
2012	Switzerland	WJC	8th	6	1	1	2	2
2013	Switzerland	WJC	6th	6	5	3	8	4
2016	Switzerland	WC	11th	7	3	4	7	4
2018	Switzerland	WC	2nd place, silver medalist(s)	9	2	7	9	27
2019	Switzerland	WC	8th	6	3	0	3	2
2021	Switzerland	WC	6th	8	2	2	4	2
2022	Switzerland	OLY	8th	5	0	3	3	0
2024	Switzerland	WC	2nd place, silver medalist(s)	10	1	2	3	0
2025	Switzerland	WC	2nd place, silver medalist(s)	9	7	1	8	4
2026	Switzerland	OLY	5th	5	0	3	3	0
2026	Switzerland	WC	2nd place, silver medalist(s)	10	4	11	15	6
Junior totals				24	9	9	18	16
Senior totals				69	22	33	55	45

== Awards and honours ==
Award	Year
QMJHL
All-Rookie Team	2011–12
AHL
Player of the Week (2–9 February 2014)	2013–14
NL
Media Swiss All-Star Team	2021
Media All-Star Team	2021
Champion (ZSC Lions)	2024, 2025
Champions Hockey League
Champion (ZSC Lions)	2024–25
Most Valuable Player	2024–25
Top Scorer	2024–25
International
IIHF Male Player of the Year	2025
