= Simon Le Coultre =

Swiss ice hockey defenceman

- Born: August 9, 1999 (age 26); Le Sentier, Switzerland
- Height: 6 ft 0 in (183 cm)
- Weight: 185 lb (84 kg; 13 st 3 lb)
- Position: Defence
- Shoots: Left
- NL team: Genève-Servette HC
- NHL draft: Undrafted
- Playing career: 2019–present

Simon Le Coultre (born August 9, 1999) is a Swiss professional ice hockey defenceman for Genève-Servette HC of the National League (NL). He played his junior hockey with the Moncton Wildcats of the QMJHL.

== Playing career ==
Le Coultre played 154 games (60 points) over 3 seasons with the Moncton Wildcats of the QMJHL.

On January 8, 2019, Le Coultre signed his first professional contract with Genève-Servette HC of the National League, agreeing to a 3-year deal. Le Coultre scored his first NL goal on September 20, 2019, against HC Ambrì-Piotta in a 3-2 shootout win at the Valascia. He finished his first NL season having played all 50 regular season games and tallied 19 points (5 goals).

On January 16, 2021, Le Coultre was issued a two-game suspension and a CHF 1,700 fine for a late hit on HC Ambrì-Piotta's Brian Flynn in a game on January 12, 2021.

On July 6, 2021, Le Coultre was signed to an early two-year contract extension by Servette through the 2023-24 season.

== International play ==
Le Coultre played in the 2018 and 2019 IIHF World Junior Championship with Switzerland's under-20 national team.

Le Coultre made his debut with Switzerland men's national team at the 2019 Deutschland Cup.
