= Matthew Greenfield (ice hockey) =

Ice hockey goaltender

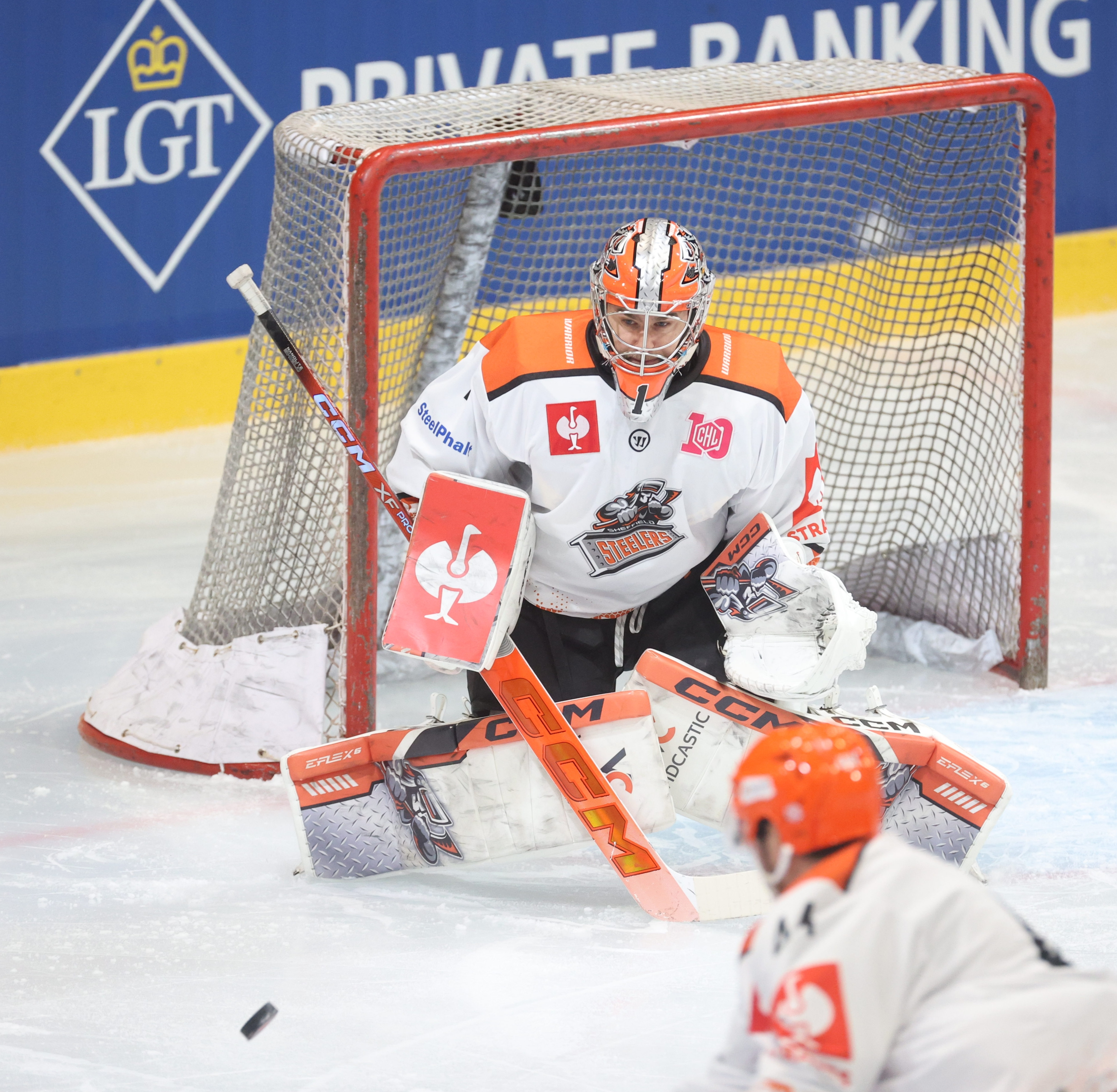
- Greenfield in 2024
- Born: January 22, 1995 (age 31) Parkland, Florida, USA
- Height: 185 cm (6 ft 1 in)
- Weight: 84 kg (185 lb; 13 st 3 lb)
- Position: Goaltender
- Catches: Left
- EIHL team: Sheffield Steelers

Matthew Greenfield (born 22nd January, 1995) is an American professional ice hockey goaltender for the Sheffield Steelers, who play in the Elite Ice Hockey League (EIHL). He is currently signed until the end of the 2027-28 season after signing a three-year contract extension prior to the 2025-26 season. Greenfield started his junior career in the United States and Canada, including playing for the University of Calgary. Greenfield reached the American Hockey League (AHL), signing with the Springfield Thunderbirds in the 2018-19 season and the Stockton Heat in the 2021-22 season, both of which he never played a game; instead, playing with their ECHL counter-parts.

After signing with the Sheffield Steelers in the 2022-23 season, Greenfield has become the most decorated goaltender in Steelers history after recording his 25th shutout in the 2025-26 season, beating Jody Lehman's previous record of 24. Greenfield won the Grand Slam with the Steelers in the 2023-24 season, winning the League, the Challenge Cup, and the Playoffs. He has also won EIHL Netminder of the Year three straight seasons in a row, being the 2022-23 season, the 2023-24 season, and the 2024-25 season, and has made the EIHL All-Star First Team twice, in the 2022-23 season and the 2023-24 season.

== Playing career ==
Greenfield started his junior career in the US and Canada, playing in Florida, Illinois, Kitchener and West Kelowna. He signed with the ECHL side Kansas City Mavericks for the 2020-21 season and again on a two-way deal with their AHL team Stockton Heat for the 2021-22 season.

=== Sheffield Steelers (2022 - present) ===
Greenfield joined the Steelers ahead of the 2022-23 EIHL Season. Since then, he has played in 229 games, winning 163 of them. He has recorded 25 shutouts, a 2.19 Goals Against Average (GAA), and an average save percentage of 92.28%.

== Career statistics ==
Season/Year	Team	League	Games Played	Save Percentage	Goals Against Average
2022-23	Sheffield Steelers	EIHL	53	.920	2.22
2023-24	Sheffield Steelers	EIHL	47	.930	1.93
2024-25	Sheffield Steelers	EIHL	49	.928	2.24
2025-26	Sheffield Steelers	EIHL	35	.916	2.44

Ref:
