= 2026 IIHF World Championship playoff round =

Ice hockey results

The playoff round of the 2026 IIHF World Championship was held from 28 to 31 May 2026. The top four of each preliminary group qualified for the playoff round.

== Qualified teams ==
Group	Winners	Runners-up	Third place	Fourth place
A	Switzerland	Finland	Latvia	United States
B	Canada	Norway	Czechia	Sweden

=== Qualified teams' seedings ===
Quarter-finalists were paired according to their positions in the groups: the first-placed team in each preliminary-round group played the fourth-place team of the other group, while the second-place team played the third-place team of the other group.

Semi-finalists were paired according to their seeding after the preliminary round, which was determined by the following criteria. The best-ranked semi-finalist played against the lowest-ranked semi-finalist, while the second-best ranked semi-finalist played the third-best ranked semi-finalist.

Rank	Team	Grp	Pos	Pts	GD	GF	Seed
1	Switzerland	A	1	21	+32	39	3
2	Canada	B	1	20	+20	33	4
3	Finland	A	2	18	+20	31	7
4	Norway	B	2	15	+11	25	13
5	Czechia	B	3	13	+2	19	6
6	Latvia	A	3	12	+7	24	11
7	Sweden	B	4	12	+11	27	5
8	United States	A	4	11	+4	25	2

Classification rules: 1) position in the group; 2) number of points; 3) goal difference; 4) number of goals scored for; 5) seeding number entering the tournament.

== Bracket ==
There was a re-seeding after the quarterfinals.

Quarter-finals
28 May
1A Switzerland	3
4B Sweden	1
28 May
1B Canada	4
4A United States	0
28 May
2A Finland	4
3B Czechia	1
28 May
2B Norway	2
3A Latvia	0

Semi-finals
30 May
1 Switzerland	6
4 Norway	0
30 May
2 Canada	2
3 Finland	4

Final
31 May
1 Switzerland	0
3 Finland (OT)	1
Third place
31 May
2 Canada	2
4 Norway (OT)	3

All times are local (UTC+2).

== Quarterfinals ==
28 May 2026; 16:20	Finland	4–1 (2–0, 1–1, 1–0)	Czechia	Swiss Life Arena, Zürich; Attendance: 10,000

Game reference

Justus Annunen
Goalies
Josef Kořenář
Referees:
(Sweden) Christoffer Holm
(United States) Sean MacFarlane
Linesmen:
(United States) Shane Gustafson
(United States) John Rey

Manninen (Puljujärvi) – 07:33	1–0
Lundell (Hämeenaho, Vaakanainen) – 14:32	2–0
Helenius (Barkov, Granlund) – 21:35	3–0
	3–1	30:51 – Hronek (Kubalík, Červenka) (PP2)
Hämeenaho (Manninen) – 55:31	4–1

6 min
Penalties
6 min
28
Shots
26

28 May 2026; 16:20	Canada	4–0 (1–0, 1–0, 2–0)	United States	BCF Arena, Fribourg; Attendance: 7,500

Game reference

Jet Greaves
Goalies
Devin Cooley
Referees:
(Sweden) Tobias Björk
(Germany) André Schrader
Linesmen:
(Slovakia) Oto Durmis
(Sweden) Anders Nyqvist

Celebrini (Scheifele, Mateychuk) (PP) – 18:31	1–0
Holloway (Scheifele) – 29:48	2–0
Brown (Whitecloud, O'Reilly) (EN) – 58:01	3–0
Crosby (Cozens, Nurse) (EN) – 58:41	4–0

8 min
Penalties
33 min
38
Shots
34

28 May 2026; 20:20	Switzerland	3–1 (1–1, 2–0, 0–0)	Sweden	Swiss Life Arena, Zürich; Attendance: 10,000

Game reference

Leonardo Genoni
Goalies
Magnus Hellberg
Referees:
(Finland) Riku Brander
(Finland) Mikko Kaukokari
Linesmen:
(Canada) Brian Birkhoff
(Canada) Mitchell Gibbs

	0–1	06:21 – Karlsson (Heineman, Ekman-Larsson)
Josi (Malgin) – 13:23	1–1
Malgin (Josi, Moser) – 32:58	2–1
Thürkauf (Hischier, Josi) (PP) – 36:31	3–1

35 min
Penalties
6 min
32
Shots
22

28 May 2026; 20:20	Norway	2–0 (0–0, 1–0, 1–0)	Latvia	BCF Arena, Fribourg; Attendance: 7,500

Game reference
Henrik Haukeland	Goalies	Kristers Gudļevskis	Referees: (Canada) Taylor Burzminski (Canada) Jesse Gour; Linesmen: (Sweden) Gustav Jonsson (Czech Republic) Lukáš Rampír
Koblar (Brandsegg-Nygård, Hurrod) – 27:10 / 1–0; Steen (Pettersen) (EN) – 59:44 / 2–0			Referees: (Canada) Taylor Burzminski (Canada) Jesse Gour; Linesmen: (Sweden) Gustav Jonsson (Czech Republic) Lukáš Rampír
4 min	Penalties	6 min	Referees: (Canada) Taylor Burzminski (Canada) Jesse Gour; Linesmen: (Sweden) Gustav Jonsson (Czech Republic) Lukáš Rampír
24	Shots	35	Referees: (Canada) Taylor Burzminski (Canada) Jesse Gour; Linesmen: (Sweden) Gustav Jonsson (Czech Republic) Lukáš Rampír

== Semifinals ==
30 May 2026; 15:20	Switzerland	6–0 (1–0, 3–0, 2–0)	Norway	Swiss Life Arena, Zürich; Attendance: 10,000

Game reference

Leonardo Genoni
Goalies
Henrik Haukeland
Referees:
(Sweden) Tobias Björk
(Germany) André Schrader
Linesmen:
(United States) Shane Gustafson
(Finland) Onni Hautamäki

Bertschy (Baechler, Egli) – 17:36	1–0
Malgin (Thürkauf) – 24:23	2–0
Jäger (Jung, Knak) – 32:51	3–0
Riat (Josi, Andrighetto) (PP) – 36:24	4–0
Hischier (Riat, Andrighetto) (PP) – 44:27	5–0
Rochette (Suter, (Biasca) – 57:34	6–0

12 min
Penalties
14 min
30
Shots
20

30 May 2026; 20:00	Canada	2–4 (2–1, 0–3, 0–0)	Finland	Swiss Life Arena, Zürich; Attendance: 10,000

Game reference

Jet Greaves
Goalies
Justus Annunen
Referees:
(Sweden) Christoffer Holm
(United States) Sean MacFarlane
Linesmen:
(Slovakia) Oto Durmis
(Czech Republic) Jiří Ondráček

	0–1	03:30 – Puistola (Helenius)
Thomas (Holloway, Mateychuk) – 08:17	1–1
Holloway (Celebrini, DeMelo) – 14:26	2–1
	2–2	20:49 – Barkov (Granlund, Lehtonen)
	2–3	31:28 – Helenius (Granlund, Barkov)
	2–4	32:50 – Räty

0 min
Penalties
4 min
30
Shots
21

== Bronze medal game ==
31 May 2026; 15:30	Canada	2–3 OT (0–1, 0–1, 2–0) (OT: 0–1)	Norway	Swiss Life Arena, Zürich; Attendance: 10,000

Game reference

Jet Greaves
Goalies
Henrik Haukeland
Referees:
(Sweden) Christoffer Holm
(United States) Sean MacFarlane
Linesmen:
(Finland) Onni Hautamäki
(United States) John Rey

	0–1	06:44 – Pettersen (Kåsastul)
	0–2	32:29 – Solberg (Brandsegg-Nygård, Johannesen)
Thomas (EA) – 58:44	1–2
Thomas (O'Reilly, Celebrini) (EA) – 59:52	2–2
	2–3	63:32 – Steen

8 min
Penalties
8 min
46
Shots
24

== Gold medal game ==
31 May 2026; 20:20	Switzerland	0–1 OT (0–0, 0–0, 0–0) (OT: 0–1)	Finland	Swiss Life Arena, Zürich; Attendance: 10,000

Game reference
Leonardo Genoni	Goalies	Justus Annunen	Referees: (Sweden) Tobias Björk (Germany) André Schrader; Linesmen: (Canada) Brian Birkhoff (Sweden) Anders Nyqvist
0–1 / 70:42 – Helenius (Lundell, Lehtonen)			Referees: (Sweden) Tobias Björk (Germany) André Schrader; Linesmen: (Canada) Brian Birkhoff (Sweden) Anders Nyqvist
10 min	Penalties	8 min	Referees: (Sweden) Tobias Björk (Germany) André Schrader; Linesmen: (Canada) Brian Birkhoff (Sweden) Anders Nyqvist
22	Shots	28	Referees: (Sweden) Tobias Björk (Germany) André Schrader; Linesmen: (Canada) Brian Birkhoff (Sweden) Anders Nyqvist
