= 2026 IIHF World Championship Group A =

Ice hockey tournament group stage

Group A was one of two groups of the 2026 IIHF World Championship. The four best-placed teams advanced to the playoff round, while the last placed team was relegated to Division I in 2027.

== Standings ==
Pos	Team	Pld	W	OTW	OTL	L	GF	GA	GD	Pts	Qualification or relegation
1	Switzerland (H)	7	7	0	0	0	39	7	+32	21	Quarterfinals
2	Finland	7	6	0	0	1	31	11	+20	18	Quarterfinals
3	Latvia	7	4	0	0	3	24	17	+7	12	Quarterfinals
4	United States	7	3	1	0	3	25	21	+4	11	Quarterfinals
5	Germany	7	3	0	1	3	23	22	+1	10	Qualified for the 2027 IIHF World Championship
6	Austria	7	3	0	0	4	17	29	−12	9	Qualified for the 2027 IIHF World Championship
7	Hungary	7	1	0	0	6	14	38	−24	3	Qualified for the 2027 IIHF World Championship
8	Great Britain	7	0	0	0	7	7	35	−28	0	Relegated to the 2027 Division I A

Source: IIHF
Rules for classification: 1) points; 2) head-to-head points; 3) head-to-head goal difference; 4) head-to-head number of goals scored; 5) result against closest best-ranked team outside tied teams; 6) seeding before tournament
(H) Host

== Matches ==
All times are local (UTC+2).

=== Finland vs Germany ===
15 May 2026; 16:20	Finland	3–1 (1–0, 0–0, 2–1)	Germany	Swiss Life Arena, Zürich; Attendance: 9,516

Game reference

Justus Annunen
Goalies
Philipp Grubauer
Referees:
(Canada) Taylor Burzminski
(Sweden) Christoffer Holm
Linesmen:
(Sweden) Anders Nyqvist
(Czech Republic) Jiří Ondráček

Lundell (Teräväinen, Barkov) (PP) – 08:33	1–0
Puljujärvi (Teräväinen, Lundell) (PP) – 43:05	2–0
	2–1	48:09 – Loibl (Gawanke, Hüttl)
Räty (Mäenalanen, Puljujärvi) – 55:25	3–1

10 min
Penalties
6 min
27
Shots
18

=== United States vs Switzerland ===
15 May 2026; 20:20	United States	1–3 (0–2, 0–0, 1–1)	Switzerland	Swiss Life Arena, Zürich; Attendance: 10,000

Game reference

Joseph Woll
Goalies
Leonardo Genoni
Referees:
(Sweden) Tobias Björk
(Czech Republic) Jiří Ondráček
Linesmen:
(Canada) Mitchell Gibbs
(Czech Republic) Lukáš Rampir

	0–1	02:03 – Suter (Andrighetto, Moser)
	0–2	11:19 – Andrighetto (Malgin, Suter)
Steeves (Lindgren, Borgen) – 48:45	1–2
	1–3	56:21 – Jäger (Knak, Kukan)

12 min
Penalties
10 min
20
Shots
19

=== Great Britain vs Austria ===
16 May 2026; 12:20	Great Britain	2–5 (2–3, 0–2, 0–0)	Austria	Swiss Life Arena, Zürich; Attendance: 7,974

Game reference

Mat Robson
Goalies
David Kickert
Referees:
(Sweden) Christoffer Holm
(Germany) Lukas Kohlmüller
Linesmen:
(Canada) Brian Birkhoff
(Norway) Njaal Søstumoen

	0–1	02:50 – Nissner (Zwerger, Wolf)
	0–2	06:00 – Schneider (Nissner)
	0–3	09:47 – Huber (Nickl)
Clements (Perlini, Hazeldine) – 15:33	1–3
Kirk (Neilson, Halbert) – 16:10	2–3
	2–4	26:43 – Schneider (Zwerger, Nickl)
	2–5	33:27 – Wallner (Wolf, Kolarik)

6 min
Penalties
6 min
20
Shots
33

=== Hungary vs Finland ===
16 May 2026; 16:20	Hungary	1–4 (0–0, 1–3, 0–1)	Finland	Swiss Life Arena, Zürich; Attendance: 9,069

Game reference

Ádám Vay
Goalies
Joonas Korpisalo
Referees:
(Sweden) Tobias Björk
(Norway) Marcus Wannerstedt
Linesmen:
(Sweden) Gustav Jonsson
(Czech Republic) Lukáš Rampir

	0–1	20:46 – Heinola (Vaakanainen, Puljujärvi)
	0–2	23:15 – Puljujärvi (Barkov, Manninen)
Sebők (Horváth, Terbócs) – 27:01	1–2
	1–3	36:03 – Kuokkanen (Räty, Jokiharju)
	1–4	42:36 – Puljujärvi (Barkov, Heinola) (PP)

6 min
Penalties
0 min
10
Shots
32

=== Switzerland vs Latvia ===
16 May 2026; 20:20	Switzerland	4–2 (0–0, 2–1, 2–1)	Latvia	Swiss Life Arena, Zürich; Attendance: 10,000

Game reference

Sandro Aeschlimann
Goalies
Kristers Gudļevskis
Referees:
(Canada) Jesse Gour
(Slovakia) Tomáš Hronský
Linesmen:
(Slovakia) Oto Durmis
(Czech Republic) Jiří Ondráček

Meier (Hischier, Rochette) – 30:10	1–0
	1–1	31:45 – Balcers (Smirnovs, Vilmanis)
Riat (Andrighetto, Malgin) (PP) – 37:18	2–1
Kukan (Marti, Meier) – 40:59	3–1
Riat (Knak, Kukan) – 52:13	4–1
	4–2	59:46 – Balcers (Vilmanis, Smirnovs) (PP)

8 min
Penalties
6 min
43
Shots
23

=== Great Britain vs United States ===
17 May 2026; 12:20	Great Britain	1–5 (0–1, 1–1, 0–3)	United States	Swiss Life Arena, Zürich; Attendance: 6,456

Game reference

Ben Bowns
Goalies
Devin Cooley
Referees:
(Sweden) Tobias Björk
(Norway) Marcus Wannerstedt
Linesmen:
(Sweden) Gustav Jonsson
(Czech Republic) Lukáš Rampir

	0–1	13:55 – Cotter (Olivier, Sasson)
Halbert (Waller, Perlini) (PP) - 28:39	1–1
	1–2	37:01 – Howard
	1–3	42:49 – Olivier (Lafferty, Cotter)
	1–4	43:04 – Carlile (Cotter, Olivier)
	1–5	56:11 – Howard (Moore, Novak) (PP)

6 min
Penalties
2 min
20
Shots
40

=== Austria vs Hungary ===
17 May 2026; 16:20	Austria	4–2 (1–1, 0–0, 3–1)	Hungary	Swiss Life Arena, Zürich; Attendance: 7,668

Game reference

Atte Tolvanen
Goalies
Bence Bálizs
Referees:
(Germany) Lukas Kohlmüller
(Czech Republic) Jiří Ondráček
Linesmen:
(Slovakia) Oto Durmis
(Canada) Mitchell Gibbs

Rohrer (Schneider, Unterweger) (PP) – 05:01	1–0
	1–1	11:03 – Sofron (Csollák, Sebők) (PP)
Zwerger (Unterweger, Schneider) (PP) – 46:21	2–1
Nickl (Huber) – 47:05	3–1
	3–2	53:21 – Vincze (Hári, Papp) (PP2)
Nickl (EN) – 59:57	4–2

8 min
Penalties
10 min
22
Shots
19

=== Germany vs Latvia ===
17 May 2026; 20:20	Germany	0–2 (0–1, 0–1, 0–0)	Latvia	Swiss Life Arena, Zürich; Attendance: 6,633

Game reference
Philipp Grubauer	Goalies	Kristers Gudļevskis	Referees: (Canada) Jesse Gour (Slovakia) Tomáš Hronský; Linesmen: (Canada) Brian Birkhoff (Norway) Njaal Søstumoen
0–1 / 18:19 – Dzierkals (Batņa); 0–2 / 24:56 – Balcers (Smirnovs) (PP)			Referees: (Canada) Jesse Gour (Slovakia) Tomáš Hronský; Linesmen: (Canada) Brian Birkhoff (Norway) Njaal Søstumoen
4 min	Penalties	6 min	Referees: (Canada) Jesse Gour (Slovakia) Tomáš Hronský; Linesmen: (Canada) Brian Birkhoff (Norway) Njaal Søstumoen
26	Shots	22	Referees: (Canada) Jesse Gour (Slovakia) Tomáš Hronský; Linesmen: (Canada) Brian Birkhoff (Norway) Njaal Søstumoen

=== Finland vs United States ===
18 May 2026; 16:20	Finland	6–2 (3–1, 2–0, 1–1)	United States	Swiss Life Arena, Zürich; Attendance: 9,206

Game reference

Justus Annunen
Goalies
Joseph Woll
Devin Cooley
Referees:
(Sweden) Tobias Björk
(Slovakia) Tomáš Hronský
Linesmen:
(Canada) Brian Birkhoff
(Czech Republic) Jiří Ondráček

Hämeenaho – 06:06	1–0
	1–1	07:44 – Coronato (Moore)
Puistola (Hämeenaho, Määttä) – 08:45	2–1
Räty (Lehtonen, Björninen) – 14:10	3–1
Hämeenaho (Lehtonen, Kuokkanen) (PP) – 21:26	4–1
Mäenalanen (Määttä, Merelä) – 21:57	5–1
	5–2	43:21 – Leonard (Ufko, Faulk) (PP2)
Lundell (PP) – 46:33	6–2

6 min
Penalties
10 min
28
Shots
32

=== Germany vs Switzerland ===
18 May 2026; 20:20	Germany	1–6 (0–0, 0–5, 1–1)	Switzerland	Swiss Life Arena, Zürich; Attendance: 10,000

Game reference

Jonas Stettmer
Goalies
Leonardo Genoni
Referees:
(Sweden) Christoffer Holm
(Czech Republic) Jiří Ondráček
Linesmen:
(Canada) Mitchell Gibbs
(Czech Republic) Lukáš Rampir

	0–1	25:56 – Malgin (Hischier, Josi) (SH)
	0–2	28:54 – Andrighetto (Malgin, Meier)
	0–3	29:29 – Bertschy (Niederreiter, Jung)
	0–4	37:23 – Hischier (Meier, Josi) (PP)
	0–5	38:19 – Josi (Niederreiter, Jäger) (PP)
	0–6	45:16 – Andrighetto (Malgin, Suter)
Tiffels (Reichel, Samanski) – 55:47	1–6

12 min
Penalties
10 min
17
Shots
31

=== Latvia vs Austria ===
19 May 2026; 16:20	Latvia	1–3 (0–0, 0–1, 1–2)	Austria	Swiss Life Arena, Zürich; Attendance: 8,677

Game reference

Kristers Gudļevskis
Goalies
Atte Tolvanen
Referees:
(Canada) Taylor Burzminski
(Norway) Marcus Wannerstedt
Linesmen:
(United Kingdom) Danny Beresford
(United States) John Rey

	0–1	27:11 – Harnisch (Stapelfeldt)
Balcers (Smirnovs, Šmits) – 40:25	1–1
	1–2	44:22 – Nissner (Schneider, Rohrer) (PP)
	1–3	59:58 – Rohrer (Nickl) (EN)

8 min
Penalties
4 min
26
Shots
14

=== Hungary vs Great Britain ===
19 May 2026; 20:20	Hungary	5–0 (2–0, 1–0, 2–0)	Great Britain	Swiss Life Arena, Zürich; Attendance: 7,996

Game reference

Bence Bálizs
Goalies
Ben Bowns
Mat Robson
Referees:
(United States) Nolan Bloyer
(Switzerland) Cedric Borga
Linesmen:
(Slovakia) Oto Durmis
(Norway) Njaal Søstumoen

Nagy – 02:19	1–0
Szongoth (M. Horváth, B. Horváth) – 18:14	2–0
Terbócs (SH) – 23:31	3–0
Terbócs (B. Horváth, Ortenszky) – 53:24	4–0
Nagy (Vincze, Sárpátki) – 54:05	5–0

6 min
Penalties
10 min
23
Shots
26

=== Austria vs Switzerland ===
20 May 2026; 16:20	Austria	0–9 (0–4, 0–3, 0–2)	Switzerland	Swiss Life Arena, Zürich; Attendance: 10,000

Game reference

David Kickert
Florian Vorauer
Goalies
Leonardo Genoni
Referees:
(Sweden) Christoffer Holm
(Norway) Marcus Wannerstedt
Linesmen:
(Canada) Brian Birkhoff
(Czech Republic) Jiří Ondráček

0–1	05:11 – Rochette (Malgin, Andrighetto)
0–2	09:20 – Meier (Egli)
0–3	11:28 – Hischier (Meier, Biasca)
0–4	13:21 – Riat (Andrighetto, Kukan) (PP)
0–5	29:42 – Hischier (Niederreiter, Meier) (PP)
0–6	30:03 – Thürkauf (Moser)
0–7	32:19 – Rochette (Andrighetto, Marti)
0–8	50:29 – Riat (Rochette, Malgin) (PP)
0–9	56:02 – Bertschy (Thürkauf, Jung)

8 min
Penalties
2 min
20
Shots
30

=== United States vs Germany ===
20 May 2026; 20:20	United States	4–3 GWS (1–1, 1–2, 1–0) (OT: 0–0) (SO: 1–0)	Germany	Swiss Life Arena, Zürich; Attendance: 9,731

Game reference

Devin Cooley
Goalies
Philipp Grubauer
Referees:
(Canada) Taylor Burzminski
(Czech Republic) Jiří Ondráček
Linesmen:
(Canada) Mitchell Gibbs
(Czech Republic) Lukáš Rampir

	0–1	01:00 – Seider (Tiffels, Samanski)
Howard (Steeves) – 14:33	1–1
Sasson (Ufko, Steeves) – 25:06	2–1
	2–2	29:53 – Tiffels (Reichel, Gawanke)
	2–3	32:42 – Michaelis (Ehl)
Novak (Carlile) – 54:13	3–3

Tkachuk (miss)
Cotter (miss)
Howard (miss)
Coronato
Leonard
Shootout
Samanski
(miss) Reichel
(miss) Kahun
(miss) Michaelis
(miss) Krämmer
2 min
Penalties
2 min
42
Shots
32

=== Latvia vs Finland ===
21 May 2026; 16:20	Latvia	1–7 (1–3, 0–1, 0–3)	Finland	Swiss Life Arena, Zürich; Attendance: 8,932

Game reference

Mareks Mitens
Gustavs Grigals
Goalies
Justus Annunen
Referees:
(Switzerland) Cedric Borga
(United States) Sean MacFarlane
Linesmen:
(United Kingdom) Danny Beresford
(Switzerland) Dominic Schlegel

Balcers (Vilmanis) – 00:10	1–0
	1–1	05:11 – Björninen (Jokiharju, Merelä)
	1–2	10:19 – Jokiharju (Puistola, Lehtonen)
	1–3	15:22 – Mäenalanen (Björninen)
	1–4	28:55 – Merelä (Mäenalanen, Björninen)
	1–5	40:58 – Lundell (Granlund, Barkov) (PP2)
	1–6	41:25 – Puistola (Lehtonen, Kuokkanen) (PP)
	1–7	45:36 – Räty (Hämeenaho, Lehtonen)

12 min
Penalties
14 min
15
Shots
37

=== Switzerland vs Great Britain ===
21 May 2026; 20:20	Switzerland	4–1 (1–0, 2–1, 1–0)	Great Britain	Swiss Life Arena, Zürich; Attendance: 10,000

Game reference

Reto Berra
Goalies
Mat Robson
Referees:
(United States) Nolan Bloyer
(Finland) Riku Brander
Linesmen:
(Canada) Mitchell Gibbs
(Finland) Onni Hautamäki

Niederreiter (Josi, Egli) – 05:05	1–0
Hischier – 21:02	2–0
Knak (Riat) – 28:01	3–0
	3–1	34:53 – Waller (Kirk, Richarson)
Niederreiter (Meier, Hishier) – 52:53	4–1

6 min
Penalties
8 min
41
Shots
14

=== Germany vs Hungary ===
22 May 2026; 16:20	Germany	6–2 (2–0, 2–0, 2–2)	Hungary	Swiss Life Arena, Zürich; Attendance: 7,925

Game reference

Philipp Grubauer
Goalies
Bence Bálizs
Referees:
(United States) Nolan Bloyer
(United States) Sean MacFarlane
Linesmen:
(United Kingdom) Danny Beresford
(Czech Republic) Jiří Ondráček

Mik (Kastner, Wiederer) – 08:43	1–0
Gawanke (Loibl, Michaelis) (PP) – 19:35	2–0
Reichel (Tiffels, Samanski) – 39:10	3–0
Dove-McFalls (Michaelis, Ehl) – 39:49	4–0
Gawanke (Kastner, Loibl) – 41:36	5–0
	5–1	44:35 – Sárpátki (Nagy, Garát)
Gawanke (Wissmann, Michaelis) – 49:40	6–1
	6–2	57:22 – Hári (Nemes, Kiss)

2 min
Penalties
4 min
36
Shots
12

=== Finland vs Great Britain ===
22 May 2026; 20:20	Finland	4–0 (1–0, 2–0, 1–0)	Great Britain	Swiss Life Arena, Zürich; Attendance: 7,049

Game reference

Joonas Korpisalo
Goalies
Mat Robson
Referees:
(Sweden) Christoffer Holm
(Norway) Marcus Wannerstedt
Linesmen:
(Czech Republic) Lukáš Rampir
(United States) John Rey

Heinola (Helenius, Barkov) – 00:58	1–0
Heinola (Jokiharju, Hämeenaho) – 28:30	2–0
Lehtonen (Räty, Granlund) – 31:51	3–0
Jokiharju (Saarijärvi, Puljujärvi) – 58:50	4–0

2 min
Penalties
8 min
49
Shots
9

=== Latvia vs United States ===
23 May 2026; 12:20	Latvia	4–2 (1–0, 0–1, 3–1)	United States	Swiss Life Arena, Zürich; Attendance: 9,184

Game reference

Kristers Gudļevskis
Goalies
Devin Cooley
Referees:
(Sweden) Christoffer Holm
(Austria) Christian Ofner
Linesmen:
(Finland) Onni Hautamäki
(Czech Republic) Jiří Ondráček

Egle (Dzierkals, Zīle) – 08:47	1–0
	1–1	34:48 – Tkachuk (Moore, Nelson) (PP)
Smirnovs (Vilmanis, Balcers) – 46:06	2–1
Vilmanis (Batņa) (EN) – 58:58	3–1
	3–2	59:09 – Olivier (Tkachuk, Faulk) (EA)
Vilmanis (EN) – 59:18	4–2

10 min
Penalties
8 min
22
Shots
47

=== Switzerland vs Hungary ===
23 May 2026; 16:20	Switzerland	9–0 (1–0, 6–0, 2–0)	Hungary	Swiss Life Arena, Zürich; Attendance: 10,000

Game reference

Leonardo Genoni
Goalies
Ádám Vay
Bence Bálizs
Referees:
(Germany) André Schrader
(Norway) Marcus Wannerstedt
Linesmen:
(United States) Shane Gustafson
(Czech Republic) Lukáš Rampir

Josi (Jäger, Riat) – 18:09	1–0
Josi – 20:29	2–0
Josi (Hischier, Andrighetto) (PP) – 22:54	3–0
Meier (Moser) – 31:37	4–0
Malgin (Thürkauf, Andrighetto) – 33:07	5–0
Thürkauf (Andrighetto, Malgin) – 35:48	6–0
Andrighetto (Moser, Berni) (EA) – 39:04	7–0
Malgin (Thürkauf, Andrighetto) – 52:58	8–0
Knak (Josi) – 55:09	9–0

4 min
Penalties
8 min
48
Shots
10

=== Austria vs Germany ===
23 May 2026; 20:20	Austria	2–6 (0–0, 1–2, 1–4)	Germany	Swiss Life Arena, Zürich; Attendance: 9,685

Game reference

Atte Tolvanen
Goalies
Philipp Grubauer
Referees:
(Switzerland) Cedric Borga
(Finland) Riku Brander
Linesmen:
(Latvia) Renārs Davidonis
(Switzerland) Dominic Schlegel

Wallner (Harnisch, Stapelfeldt) – 22:22	1–0
	1–1	23:28 – Reichel (Samanski, Tiffels)
	1–2	33:07 – Samanski (Tiffels, Reichel)
	1–3	45:47 – Reichel (Seider, Samanski) (PP)
	1–4	48:25 – Wiederer (Seider)
Rohrer (Schwinger, Nickl) – 48:59	2–4
	2–5	51:45 – Reichel (Tiffels, Michaelis) (PP2)
	2–6	54:44 – Ehl (Michaelis, Dove-McFalls) (EN)

10 min
Penalties
2 min
17
Shots
34

=== Great Britain vs Latvia ===
24 May 2026; 16:20	Great Britain	0–6 (0–3, 0–3, 0–0)	Latvia	Swiss Life Arena, Zürich; Attendance: 8,071

Game reference

Mat Robson
Ben Bowns
Goalies
Kristers Gudļevskis
Referees:
(Switzerland) Cedric Borga
(United States) Sean MacFarlane
Linesmen:
(Finland) Onni Hautamäki
(United States) John Rey

0–1	09:29 – Dzierkals (Egle, Tralmaks)
0–2	13:25 – Smirnovs (Tumānovs, Vilmanis)
0–3	19:18 – Balcers (Smirnovs, Mamčics)
0–4	22:03 – Tralmaks (Balcers, Šmits) (PP)
0–5	36:19 – Egle (Tralmaks)
0–6	38:41 – Krastenbergs (Vilmanis, Šmits) (PP)

10 min
Penalties
4 min
19
Shots
38

=== Finland vs Austria ===
24 May 2026; 20:20	Finland	5–2 (1–0, 3–0, 1–2)	Austria	Swiss Life Arena, Zürich; Attendance: 7,010

Game reference

Justus Annunen
Goalies
David Kickert
Referees:
(United States) Nolan Bloyer
(Germany) André Schrader
Linesmen:
(United Kingdom) Danny Beresford
(Switzerland) Dominic Schlegel

Granlund (Barkov, Heinola) (PP) – 18:39	1–0
Mäenalanen (Merelä, Saarijärvi) – 23:14	2–0
Puljujärvi (Lundell, Jokiharju) – 31:49	3–0
Manninen (Räty, Puljujärvi) – 32:36	4–0
	4–1	43:24 – Nissner (Zwerger, Schneider)
Puistola (Hämeenaho, Saarijärvi) – 47:29	5–1
	5–2	58:24 – Wallner (Scherzer, Kolarik)

6 min
Penalties
8 min
34
Shots
16

=== United States vs Hungary ===
25 May 2026; 16:20	United States	7–3 (2–0, 3–1, 2–2)	Hungary	Swiss Life Arena, Zürich; Attendance: 5,813

Game reference

Joseph Woll
Goalies
Ádám Vay
Referees:
(Finland) Riku Brander
(Switzerland) Michael Tscherrig
Linesmen:
(Latvia) Renārs Davidonis
(Germany) Patrick Laguzov

Faulk (Novak) – 09:43	1–0
Tkachuk (Novak, Coronato) (PP) – 18:22	2–0
Leonard (Novak) – 22:09	3–0
Faulk (Tkachuk, Novak) (PP) – 27:52	4–0
	4–1	30:19 – Erdély (Terbócs, Sebők)
Leonard (Faulk, Tkachuk) (PP) – 38:13	5–1
	5–2	47:15 – Erdély (M. Horváth, Hári)
	5–3	54:09 – Tornyai (Terbócs, Sebők)
Tkachuk (Hagens) (EN) – 56:45	6–3
Plante (Leonard, Novak) – 59:33	7–3

4 min
Penalties
12 min
46
Shots
17

=== Germany vs Great Britain ===
25 May 2026; 20:20	Germany	6–3 (3–0, 1–1, 2–2)	Great Britain	Swiss Life Arena, Zürich; Attendance: 5,462

Game reference

Philipp Grubauer
Goalies
Ben Bowns
Referees:
(United States) Sean MacFarlane
(Austria) Christian Ofner
Linesmen:
(United States) Shane Gustafson
(Finland) Tommi Niittylä

Karachun (Seider) – 13:56	1–0
Tiffels – 19:25	2–0
Wagner (Seider, Karachun) – 19:41	3–0
Eder (Loibl, Gawanke) – 22:12	4–0
	4–1	24:04 – Dowd (C. Neilson, Halbert) (PP)
Samanski (Reichel, Tiffels) – 40:17	5–1
Gawanke (Hüttl, Krämmer) – 49:00	6–1
	6–2	50:51 – Betteridge (Jenion)
	6–3	54:06 – Lachowicz (L. Neilson, Curran)

2 min
Penalties
2 min
42
Shots
16

=== Hungary vs Latvia ===
26 May 2026; 12:20	Hungary	1–8 (0–3, 1–2, 0–3)	Latvia	Swiss Life Arena, Zürich; Attendance: 7,485

Game reference

Bence Bálizs
Goalies
Kristers Gudļevskis
Referees:
(United States) Sean MacFarlane
(Austria) Christian Ofner
Linesmen:
(United Kingdom) Danny Beresford
(Switzerland) Dominic Schlegel

	0–1	09:48 – Balcers (Vilmanis, Tralmaks) (PP)
	0–2	18:38 – Smirnovs (Zīle, Andersons) (PP)
	0–3	19:47 – Tralmaks (Egle, Dzierkals)
	0–4	27:53 – Andersons (Batņa, Krastenbergs) (PP)
	0–5	34:51 – Tumānovs (Andžāns, Smirnovs)
Nemes (Hadobás, Horváth) – 37:57	1–5
	1–6	54:44 – Krastenbergs (Egle, Andžāns)
	1–7	57:00 – Vilmanis (Balcers) (SH)
	1–8	58:03 – Vilmanis (Šmits, Tralmaks) (PP)

10 min
Penalties
4 min
15
Shots
27

=== United States vs Austria ===
26 May 2026; 16:20	United States	4–1 (2–0, 2–1, 0–0)	Austria	Swiss Life Arena, Zürich; Attendance: 9,126

Game reference

Devin Cooley
Goalies
Atte Tolvanen
Referees:
(Finland) Riku Brander
(Finland) Mikko Kaukokari
Linesmen:
(Latvia) Renārs Davidonis
(Finland) Onni Hautamäki

Clifton (Borgen, Steeves) – 05:34	1–0
Ufko (Novak) – 06:19	2–0
Cotter (Olivier, Borgen) – 21:07	3–0
Tkachuk (Coronato, Leonard) (PP) – 31:52	4–0
	4–1	36:10 – Schwinger (Maier, Wallner)

4 min
Penalties
6 min
36
Shots
25

=== Switzerland vs Finland ===
26 May 2026; 20:20	Switzerland	4–2 (2–0, 0–2, 2–0)	Finland	Swiss Life Arena, Zürich; Attendance: 10,000

Game reference

Reto Berra
Goalies
Justus Annunen
Referees:
(United States) Nolan Bloyer
(Germany) André Schrader
Linesmen:
(United States) Shane Gustafson
(United States) John Rey

Biasca (Egli) – 00:40	1–0
Jäger – 03:59	2–0
	2–1	32:48 – Barkov (Jokiharju, Heinola)
	2–2	35:18 – Barkov (Helenius, Jokiharju)
Jäger (Meier, Rochette) (PP) – 56:47	3–2
Hischier (Jäger, Meier) (EN) – 59:05	4–2

8 min
Penalties
14 min
24
Shots
26
