= 2026 IIHF World Championship final =

Ice hockey game

	1	2	3	OT	Total
Switzerland	0	0	0	0	0
Finland	0	0	0	1	1
- Date: 31 May 2026
- Arena: Swiss Life Arena
- City: Zürich
- Attendance: 10,000

The 2026 IIHF World Championship final was played between Switzerland and Finland at the Swiss Life Arena in Zürich, Switzerland on 31 May 2026 to decide the winner of the 2026 IIHF World Championship.

Finland won the title for the fifth time, beating the Swiss hosts 1–0 in overtime, marking Switzerland's third consecutive loss in the final.

== Road to the final ==
Switzerland
Round
Finland
Opponent
Result
Preliminary round
Opponent
Result
United States
3–1
Game 1
Germany
3–1
Latvia
4–2
Game 2
Hungary
4–1
Germany
6–1
Game 3
United States
6–2
Austria
9–0
Game 4
Latvia
7–1
Great Britain
4–1
Game 5
Great Britain
4–0
Hungary
9–0
Game 6
Austria
5–2
Finland
4–2
Game 7
Switzerland
2–4

Pos	Team	Pld	Pts
1	Switzerland (H)	7	21
2	Finland	7	18
3	Latvia	7	12
4	United States	7	11
5	Germany	7	10
6	Austria	7	9
7	Hungary	7	3
8	Great Britain	7	0

Source: IIHF
(H) Host
Preliminary

Pos	Team	Pld	Pts
1	Switzerland (H)	7	21
2	Finland	7	18
3	Latvia	7	12
4	United States	7	11
5	Germany	7	10
6	Austria	7	9
7	Hungary	7	3
8	Great Britain	7	0

Source: IIHF
(H) Host
Opponent
Result
Playoff
Opponent
Result
Sweden
3–1
Quarterfinals
Czechia
4–1
Norway
6–0
Semifinals
Canada
4–2

== Match ==
31 May 2026; 20:20	Switzerland	0–1 OT (0–0, 0–0, 0–0) (OT: 0–1)	Finland	Swiss Life Arena, Zürich; Attendance: 10,000

Game reference
Leonardo Genoni	Goalies	Justus Annunen	Referees: (Sweden) Tobias Björk (Germany) André Schrader; Linesmen: (Canada) Brian Birkhoff (Sweden) Anders Nyqvist
0–1 / 70:42 – Helenius (Lundell, Lehtonen)			Referees: (Sweden) Tobias Björk (Germany) André Schrader; Linesmen: (Canada) Brian Birkhoff (Sweden) Anders Nyqvist
10 min	Penalties	8 min	Referees: (Sweden) Tobias Björk (Germany) André Schrader; Linesmen: (Canada) Brian Birkhoff (Sweden) Anders Nyqvist
22	Shots	28	Referees: (Sweden) Tobias Björk (Germany) André Schrader; Linesmen: (Canada) Brian Birkhoff (Sweden) Anders Nyqvist
