= Noah Steen =

Norwegian ice hockey player (born 2004)

- Born: 16 August 2004 (age 21) Oslo, Norway
- Height: 6 ft 1 in (185 cm)
- Weight: 194 lb (88 kg; 13 st 12 lb)
- Position: Winger
- Shoots: Left
- NHL team (P) Cur. team Former teams: Tampa Bay Lightning; Syracuse Crunch (AHL); Örebro HK
- National team: Norway
- NHL draft: 199th overall, 2024; Tampa Bay Lightning
- Playing career: 2023–present

Noah Steen (born 16 August 2004) is a Norwegian professional ice hockey player who is a winger for Syracuse Crunch in the American Hockey League (AHL) while under contract as a prospect to the Tampa Bay Lightning of the National Hockey League (NHL).

== Playing career ==
In April 2024, Steen signed a three-year contract with Örebro HK of the Swedish Hockey League (SHL).

On 29 June 2024, Steen was selected by the Tampa Bay Lightning in the seventh round of the 2024 NHL entry draft.

On 31 March 2026, Steen signed with the Lightning on a two-year, entry-level contract. Steen then joined the Syracuse Crunch of the American Hockey League (AHL) on a professional tryout (PTO) for the remainder of the 2025–26 season.

== International play ==
Medal record

Men's ice hockey

Representing Norway

World Championships
Bronze medal – third place	2026 Switzerland	

Steen represented the Norway national team at the 2023, 2024, 2025, and 2026 IIHF World Championship. He scored the overtime game-winning goal for Norway in the bronze medal game against Canada in the 2026 IIHF World Championship, earning Norway's first medal of any color in the tournament.

== Career statistics ==
=== Regular season and playoffs ===
			Regular season					Playoffs
Season	Team	League	GP	G	A	Pts	PIM	GP	G	A	Pts	PIM
2018–19	Lørenskog U18	Norway U18	1	0	0	0	0	—	—	—	—	—
2019–20	Lørenskog U18	Norway U18	24	19	22	41	61	—	—	—	—	—
2019–20	Lørenskog U21	Norway U21	13	4	1	5	24	—	—	—	—	—
2020–21	Mora IK J18	J18 Region	7	0	0	0	0	—	—	—	—	—
2021–22	Mora IK J18	J18 Region	30	19	28	47	45	5	0	3	3	4
2021–22	Mora IK J20	J20 Nationell	11	4	0	4	6	—	—	—	—	—
2022–23	Mora IK J20	J20 Nationell	43	17	11	28	78	2	0	0	0	0
2023–24	Mora IK	Allsv	40	14	3	17	24	—	—	—	—	—
2024–25	Örebro HK	SHL	51	5	1	6	47	3	0	0	0	0
2025–26	Örebro HK	SHL	52	12	10	22	18	3	0	0	0	0
2025–26	Syracuse Crunch	AHL	5	1	0	1	5	2	0	0	0	0
SHL totals			103	17	11	28	65	6	0	0	0	0
AHL totals			5	1	0	1	5	2	0	0	0	0

=== International ===
Year	Team	Event	GP	G	A	Pts	PIM
2023	Norway U20	WJC-20 (D1)	5	1	2	3	0
2023	Norway	WC	5	0	0	0	0
2024	Norway U20	WJC-20	5	1	2	3	4
2024	Norway	WC	7	1	2	3	4
2024	Norway	OGQ	3	0	0	0	0
2025	Norway	WC	7	2	0	2	2
2026	Norway	WC	10	7	0	7	8
Junior totals			10	2	4	6	4
Senior totals			32	10	2	12	14
