= Henrik Haukeland =

Norwegian ice hockey player (born 1994)

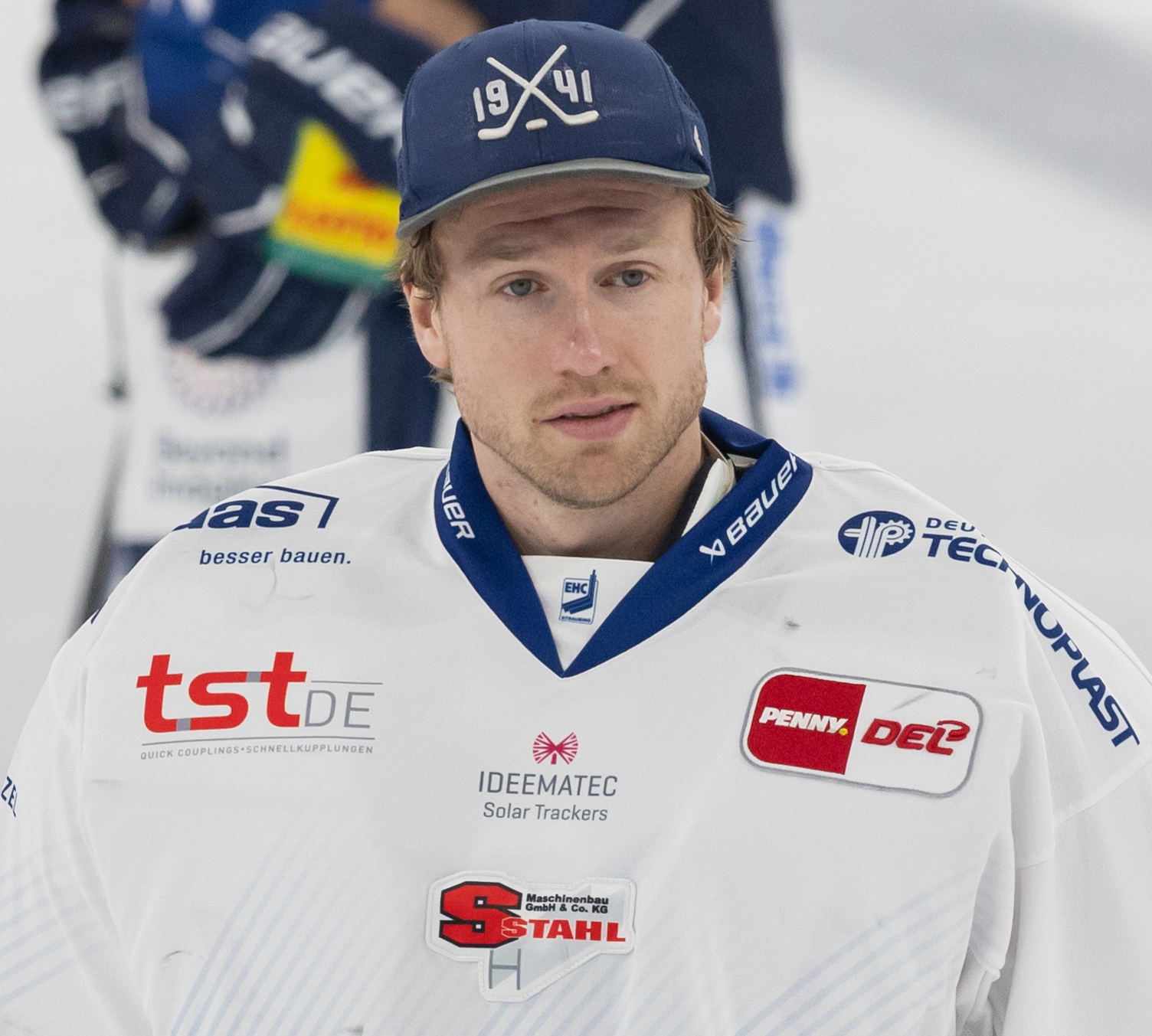
- Haukeland in 2026
- Born: 6 December 1994 (age 31) Fredrikstad, Norway
- Height: 6 ft 2 in (188 cm)
- Weight: 205 lb (93 kg; 14 st 9 lb)
- Position: Goaltender
- Catches: Left
- KHL team Former teams: Traktor Chelyabinsk; Stjernen Hockey; Leksands IF; TPS; KooKoo; Färjestad BK; EHC München; Straubing Tigers
- National team: Norway
- Playing career: 2011–present

Medal record

Men's ice hockey

Representing Norway

World Championships
| Bronze medal – third place | 2026 Switzerland | |

Henrik Haukeland (born 6 December 1994) is a Norwegian professional ice hockey player who is a goaltender for Traktor Chelyabinsk of the Kontinental Hockey League (KHL).

Haukeland has also played for the Norwegian national team. After participating in the 2017 and 2018 IIHF World Championships, he helped Norway win its first medal with a bronze at the 2026 edition and was named the tournament's best goaltender. Despite the accolade, he was barred from continuing with the team upon signing a two-year contract with Chelyabinsk in June; due to the 2022 Russian invasion of Ukraine, the Norwegian Ice Hockey Association has a policy banning players from representing the national team if they play in Russia or Belarus.

== Awards ==
- Leksands IF:
  - Allsvenskan to SHL Promotion, 2015–16
- Timrå IK:
  - Allsvenskan Best GAA (1.72)
  - Allsvenskan Best SVS% (.929)
  - Allsvenskan Goalie of the Year
  - Allsvenskan to SHL Promotion, 2017–18
- KooKoo:
  - SM-liiga Player of the Month, (January) 2019–20
