= Lenni Hämeenaho =

Finnish ice hockey player (born 2004)

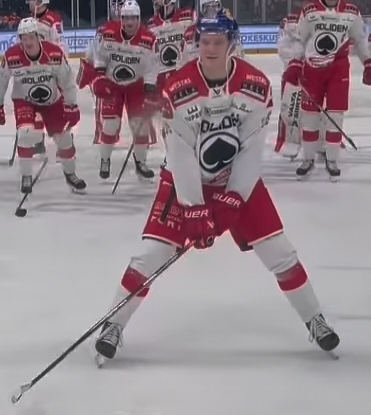
- Hämeenaho with Porin Ässät in 2023
- Born: November 7, 2004 (age 21) Kajaani, Finland
- Height: 185 cm (6 ft 1 in)
- Weight: 88.5 kg (195 lb; 13 st 13 lb)
- Position: Right wing
- Shoots: Right
- NHL team (P) Cur. team Former teams: New Jersey Devils; Utica Comets (AHL); Porin Ässät
- National team: Finland
- NHL draft: 58th overall, 2023; New Jersey Devils
- Playing career: 2022–present

Lenni Hämeenaho (Finnish: [ˈlenːi ˈhæmeːnˌɑho], born November 7, 2004) is a Finnish professional ice hockey player who is a right winger for the Utica Comets of the American Hockey League (AHL) while under contract to the New Jersey Devils of the National Hockey League (NHL). He was selected by the Devils 58th overall, in the second round of the 2023 NHL entry draft.

== Playing career ==
=== Junior ===
Hämeenaho started playing hockey at the age of four. His youth club was Kajaanin Hokki and played there until the spring of 2018, when Hämeenaho and his older brother Veikka moved to Ylivieskan Jääkarhut's U16 team at the age of 13, when Hokki had difficulties assembling a U16 team. The entire Hämeenaho family also moved to Ylivieska. Hämeenaho was the team's top scorer in both the U16 Mestis qualifiers with 46 points and the U16 Mestis with 27 points.

Entering the 2019–20 season, Hämeenaho, along with his brother Veikka and defenseman Valtteri Viirret, transferred from YJK to HC Ässät Pori through a tryout when the club's head coach Jaakko Välimaa contacted them. The entire Hämeenaho family moved to Pori to follow the brothers' hockey career. Lenni Hämeenaho was the team's top point scorer, goal scorer and assister in the U16 SM-sarja qualifiers with 50 points. In the U16 SM-sarja, he led the team in goals tied with Juuso Rajala with ten goals. In the 2020–21 season, Hämeenaho led the U18 SM-sarja in points, goals and assists with 23 goals and 37 assists totaling 60 points. He scored 14 more points than his teammate Jesperi Kaukonen, who finished second in points, but the Matti Hagman Award, which is given to the best point scorer, was not awarded as COVID-19 restrictions reduced the number of games for some teams. However, Hämeenaho was awarded the Esa Tikkanen Award as the best player in the entire U18 SM-sarja and was selected to the first All-Star team.

In the 2021–22 season, Hämeenaho was the second-best goal scorer and fourth-best in points of the Ässät U20 team with 21 goals and 37 points. He shared third place in the entire U20 SM-sarja with Vili Munkki of HC TPS, Oskari Luoto of Tappara and Tomi Palo of HPK. Hämeenaho was chosen as the rookie of the month in November. He also made his senior debut during the season, when in January 2022, Ässät loaned Hämeenaho and six other players to the Mestis team Kokkolan Hermes on to gain experience while the Ässät U20 team's games were on hiatus due to COVID-19 restrictions. Hämeenaho played three regular season games there without scoring any points.

=== Professional ===
==== Porin Ässät (2022–2025) ====
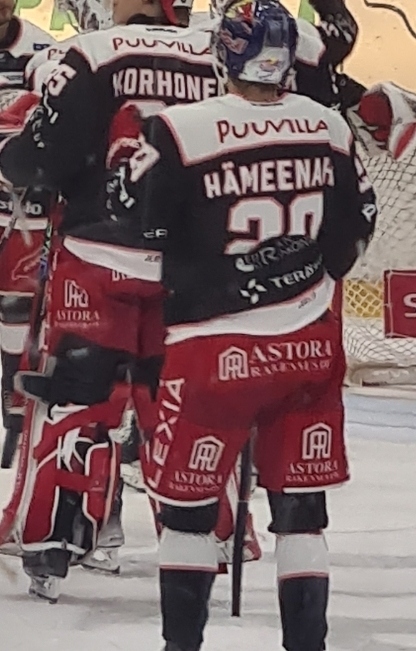
Hämeenaho with Porin Ässät in 2022.

In April 2022, Hämeenaho signed a three-year Liiga contract with the HC Ässät. He made his professional debut at the age of 17 in the opening round of the 2022–23 season on September 14, 2022, away against Ilves. Hämeenaho was assigned on the right wing of the fourth line alongside Kalle Myllymaa and Niklas Appelgren. He received 13.26 minutes of ice time in the game. Hämeenaho scored his first two goals on October 29, 2022, away against KooKoo. He was involved in every goal for his team in the game, which ended in a 3–4 loss. Miika Katajainen selected him as the third star of the game. Hämeenaho established himself in the Ässät third line, playing a total of 51 regular season games with 21 points and eight playoff games with four points during his rookie season. Hämeenaho tied for the team's top scorer in the playoffs with Joachim Rohdin and Jesse Joensuu. On July 29, 2023, Hämeenaho was selected 58th overall by the New Jersey Devils in the 2023 NHL entry draft.

Hämeenaho began the 2023–24 season on a hot streak, leading Ässät with nine goals and 14 points in the first 18 games. Slowing down somewhat over the rest of the year, he finished with 14 goals and 31 points in 45 games, and Ässät missed the playoffs by just two points. Joining Ässät's under-20 team for their playoffs, Hämeenaho recorded 12 points in six games en route to a championship victory. The following 2024–25 season, Hämeenaho established himself as a leading forward for Ässät, as he led the team in goals with 20 and was second in points with 51 just behind linemate Jan-Mikael Järvinen. Hämeenaho scored four points in two Winter Classic games against Satakunnan derby rivals Rauman Lukko in January 2025.

==== New Jersey Devils (2025–present) ====
Hämeenaho signed a three-year, entry-level contract with his draft club, the New Jersey Devils, on May 8, 2025. On October 6, he was named to the team's opening night roster, however the following day he was assigned to the Utica Comets, the Devils' American Hockey League (AHL) affiliate. He made his NHL debut on January 19, 2026, in a 2–1 victory over the Calgary Flames. Four days later, he scored his first NHL goal before adding his first assist in a 5–4 victory over the Vancouver Canucks.

== International play ==
Medal record

Men's ice hockey

Representing Finland

World Championships
Gold medal – first place	2026 Switzerland	

World U18 Championship
Bronze medal – third place	2022 Germany	

Hämeenaho represented Finland in the European Youth Olympic Festival in 2022, recording two goals and three assists for five points.

He won a bronze medal with Finland under-18 team at the 2022 World U18 Championships. In a game against Sweden, he was chosen as Finland's best player of the game.

He played for Finland junior team at the 2023 Junior Ice Hockey Championships, scoring two points in five games. Hämeenaho rejoined Finland's squad for the following year. He scored four goals and six points, including two goals in the bronze medal game where Finland conceded six straight goals, blowing a 5–2 lead to lose 8–5 to the Czech Republic.

He was selected to Finland senior team in April 2025 and represented it in the 2025 IIHF World Championship.

== Personal life ==
Hämeenaho's brother, Veikka, also plays in the Ässät organization, on the under-20 team as of the 2023–24 season. Hämeenaho's father, Jarmo, represented Kajaanin Hokki in the Mestis and has been a coach for Hokki and Ässät's junior teams.

Hämeenaho attended high school at the Porin suomalainen yhteislyseo.

== Career statistics ==
=== Regular season and playoffs ===
			Regular season					Playoffs
Season	Team	League	GP	G	A	Pts	PIM	GP	G	A	Pts	PIM
2020–21	Porin Ässät	U20 SM-sarja	1	0	0	0	2	—	—	—	—	—
2021–22	Porin Ässät	U20 SM-Sarja	42	21	16	37	12	3	0	1	1	2
2021–22	Kokkolan Hermes	Mestis	3	0	0	0	0	—	—	—	—	—
2022–23	Porin Ässät	Liiga	51	9	12	21	14	8	3	1	4	2
2023–24	Porin Ässät	Liiga	46	14	17	31	10	—	—	—	—	—
2023–24	Porin Ässät	U20 SM-sarja	—	—	—	—	—	6	4	8	12	2
2024–25	Porin Ässät	Liiga	58	20	31	51	28	10	1	4	5	4
2025–26	Utica Comets	AHL	37	10	16	26	12	—	—	—	—	—
2025–26	New Jersey Devils	NHL	33	2	6	8	14	—	—	—	—	—
Liiga totals			155	43	60	103	52	18	4	5	9	6
NHL totals			33	2	6	8	14	—	—	—	—	—

=== International ===
Year	Team	Event	Result	GP	G	A	Pts	PIM
2022	Finland	U18	3rd place, bronze medalist(s)	6	2	1	3	2
2023	Finland	WJC	5th	5	1	1	2	0
2024	Finland	WJC	4th	7	4	2	6	4
2025	Finland	WC	7th	8	1	3	4	2
2026	Finland	WC	1st place, gold medalist(s)	10	3	5	8	2
Junior totals				18	7	4	11	6
Senior totals				18	4	8	12	4

== Awards and honors ==
Award	Year	Ref
U18 SM-sarja
Esa Tikkanen Award	2020–21	
