= Devin Cooley =

American ice hockey player (born 1997)

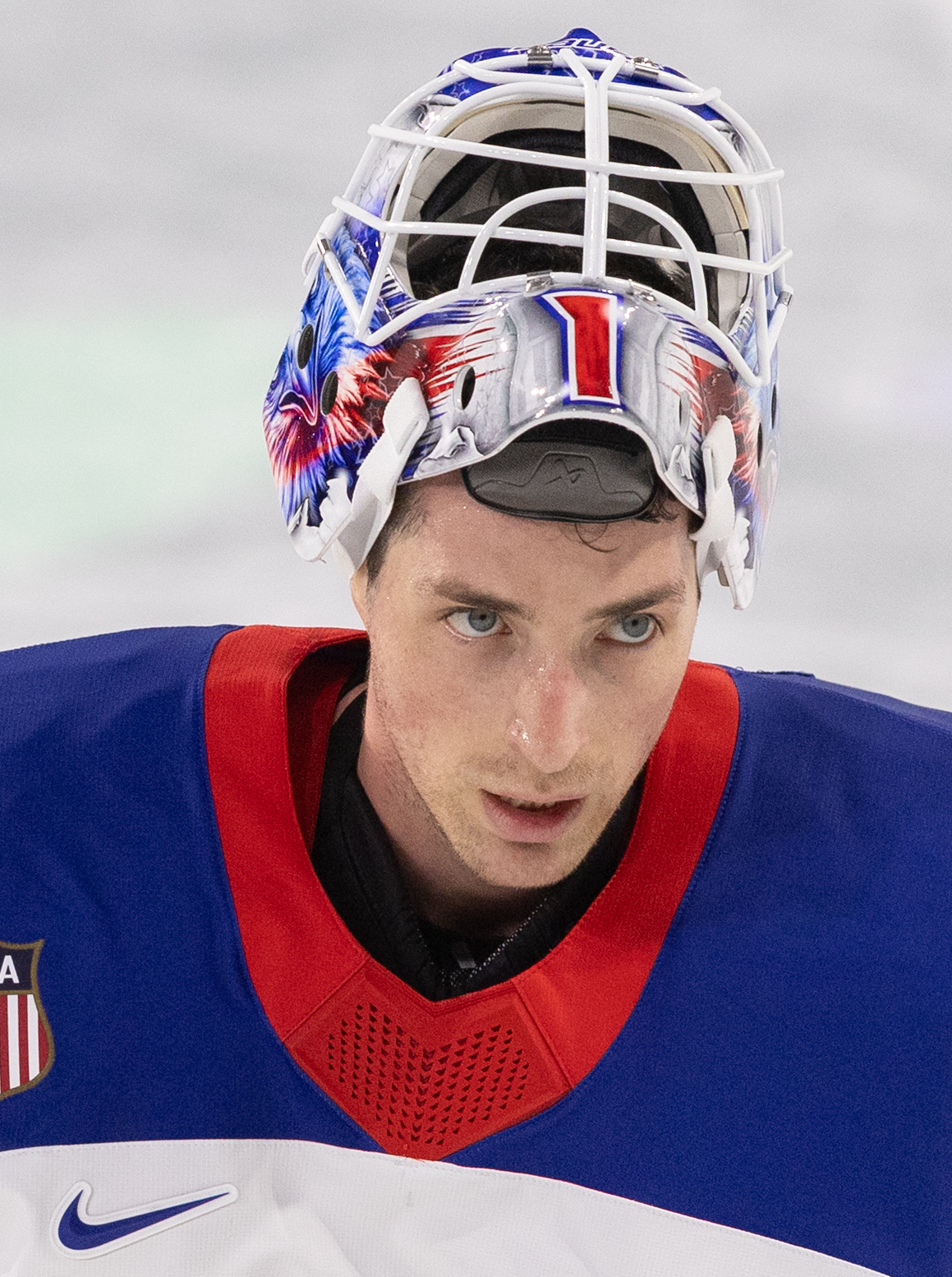
- Cooley in 2026
- Born: May 25, 1997 (age 29) Los Gatos, California, U.S.
- Height: 6 ft 5 in (196 cm)
- Weight: 192 lb (87 kg; 13 st 10 lb)
- Position: Goaltender
- Catches: Left
- NHL team Former teams: Calgary Flames; San Jose Sharks
- National team: United States
- NHL draft: Undrafted
- Playing career: 2020–present

Devin Cooley (born May 25, 1997) is an American professional ice hockey player who is a goaltender for the Calgary Flames of the National Hockey League (NHL).

== Playing career ==
Cooley with the Calgary Flames in 2026

Cooley spent time with the San Jose Jr Sharks, Muskegon Lumberjacks, Springfield Jr. Blues and Wenatchee Wild as a junior before playing three seasons at the University of Denver. Cooley appeared in 32 games, amassing 6 shutouts, a .927 save percentage and a 1.93 goals against average. Cooley signed with the Nashville Predators out of college and primarily spent the 2020–21 season with the Predators' ECHL affiliate, the Florida Everblades. He spent the next two years mainly playing with the Predators' American Hockey League (AHL) affiliate, the Milwaukee Admirals, before signing a-one year contract with the Buffalo Sabres before the 2023–24 NHL season.

Cooley was assigned to Buffalo's AHL affiliate, the Rochester Americans, to start the season, and amassed a 3–0–1 record before he was recalled on an emergency basis in order to backup Ukko-Pekka Luukkonen. Cooley would serve as the backup to Luukkonen on October 29, 2023, but would not play. He was then sent back down to Rochester after the game.

The Sabres traded Cooley to the San Jose Sharks on March 8, 2024, for a 2025 seventh-round pick. Cooley was immediately assigned to the Sharks' AHL affiliate, the San Jose Barracuda, but was recalled shortly after in order to back up former University of Denver teammate Magnus Chrona. He made his on-ice NHL debut for the Sharks on March 17, in a 5–2 loss to the Chicago Blackhawks. Cooley recorded his first NHL win on April 6, in a 3–2 overtime victory over the St. Louis Blues.

Cooley signed as a free agent to a two-year contract with the Calgary Flames on July 1, 2024.

== Personal life ==
Cooley is engaged to his fiancée, Natalie Weyers. Together they have a rabbit named Tito.

== Career statistics ==
=== Regular season and playoffs ===
			Regular season									Playoffs
Season	Team	League	GP	W	L	OTL	MIN	GA	SO	GAA	SV%	GP	W	L	MIN	GA	SO	GAA	SV%
2015–16	Muskegon Lumberjacks	USHL	19	6	6	2	911	65	0	4.28	.873	—	—	—	—	—	—	—	—
2016–17	Springfield Jr. Blues	NAHL	10	3	6	1	571	29	1	3.05	.909	—	—	—	—	—	—	—	—
2016–17	Wenatchee Wild	BCHL	14	7	3	0	686	28	3	2.45	.887	2	0	2	55	5	0	5.45	.828
2017–18	Denver Pioneers	NCHC	3	0	0	0	20	1	0	3.00	.929	—	—	—	—	—	—	—	—
2018–19	Denver Pioneers	NCHC	20	11	6	2	1,169	36	4	1.85	.934	—	—	—	—	—	—	—	—
2019–20	Denver Pioneers	NCHC	9	4	3	2	519	18	2	2.08	.908	—	—	—	—	—	—	—	—
2020–21	Chicago Wolves	AHL	2	2	0	0	120	6	0	3.00	.895	—	—	—	—	—	—	—	—
2020–21	Florida Everblades	ECHL	22	12	7	2	1,221	60	1	2.95	.911	1	0	0	25	0	0	0.00	1.000
2021–22	Milwaukee Admirals	AHL	24	9	10	2	1,294	66	0	3.06	.898	7	3	2	345	17	0	2.96	.926
2021–22	Florida Everblades	ECHL	3	2	1	0	177	4	0	1.36	.954	—	—	—	—	—	—	—	—
2022–23	Milwaukee Admirals	AHL	26	15	8	2	1,497	73	0	2.93	.909	4	2	2	236	9	0	2.29	.916
2023–24	Rochester Americans	AHL	14	6	6	2	828	52	0	3.77	.891	—	—	—	—	—	—	—	—
2023–24	San Jose Sharks	NHL	6	2	3	1	301	25	0	4.98	.870	—	—	—	—	—	—	—	—
2024–25	Calgary Wranglers	AHL	46	21	17	5	2,588	127	3	2.94	.905	—	—	—	—	—	—	—	—
2025–26	Calgary Flames	NHL	31	10	10	6	1,718	77	0	2.69	.909	—	—	—	—	—	—	—	—
NHL totals			37	12	13	7	2,019	102	0	3.03	.902	—	—	—	—	—	—	—	—

=== International ===
Year	Team	Event	Result	GP	W	L	T	MIN	GA	SO	GAA	SV%
2026	United States	WC	8th	6	3	3	0	341	10	0	1.76	.930
Senior totals				6	3	3	0	341	10	0	1.76	.930
