= 2026 IIHF World Championship =

2026 edition of the Men's Ice Hockey World Championship

Tournament details
- Host country: Switzerland
- Venues: 2 (in 2 host cities)
- Dates: 15–31 May
- Opened by: Guy Parmelin
- Teams: 16

Final positions
- Champions: Finland (5th title)
- Runners-up: Switzerland
- Third place: Norway
- Fourth place: Canada

Tournament statistics
- Games played: 64
- Goals scored: 371 (5.8 per game)
- Attendance: 466,314 (7,286 per game)
- Scoring leader: (Switzerland) Sven Andrighetto (15 points)

Awards
- MVP: (Switzerland) Roman Josi

The 2026 IIHF World Championship was hosted by Zurich and Fribourg, Switzerland from 15 to 31 May 2026, as the International Ice Hockey Federation (IIHF) announced on 27 May 2022 in Tampere, Finland.

Finland won the title for the fifth time, beating the host, Switzerland 1–0 in overtime, marking Switzerland's third consecutive loss in the final. Norway claimed its first IIHF medal after defeating Canada 3–2 in overtime and finishing third.

The tournament featured a number of upsets, most notably Norway's win over Canada in the bronze medal game, after having come within one game of relegation to Division I in both the 2024 and 2025 editions.

== Host nation bid ==
The only bidders were Kazakhstan and Switzerland.

Switzerland was originally slated to host in 2020 but the tournament was cancelled due to COVID-19 restrictions, while Kazakhstan has not hosted any tournaments.

In the end, on 27 May 2022, IIHF Congress awarded Switzerland rights to host the competition. No votes were needed, due to Kazakhstan's bid withdrawal earlier.

== Venues ==
Zurich	2026 IIHF World Championship is located in Switzerland	Fribourg
Swiss Life Arena	2026 IIHF World Championship is located in Switzerland	BCF Arena
Capacity: 10,000	2026 IIHF World Championship is located in Switzerland	Capacity: 7,500

== Participants ==
Sixteen teams took part in the competition for the 28th time. France and Kazakhstan, after taking part in the top division for three and four years respectively, were relegated to Division I after finishing last in their groups at the 2025 edition. They were replaced by Division I champions Great Britain, who secured their immediate promotion back to the top division, and runners-up, Italy, who secured their promotion back to the top division after last appearing in 2022.

Qualification	Host	Dates	Vacancies	Qualified
Top fourteen in 2025	(Denmark) Herning / (Sweden) Stockholm	9–25 May 2025	14	United States; Switzerland (H); Sweden; Denmark; Canada; Czechia; Finland; Austria; Germany; Slovakia; Latvia; Norway; Slovenia; Hungary
Promoted from Division I	(Romania) Sfântu Gheorghe	27 April – 3 May 2025	2	Great Britain; Italy

=== Summary of qualified teams ===
Team	Qualification method	Appearance(s)				Previous best performance (Note: Bold text indicates they hosted that edition.)	WR
Team	Qualification method	Total (Note: In top division. Results in tiers below are excluded.)	First	Last	Streak	Previous best performance	WR
United States	First in 2025	77th	1920	2025	40	Champions (1933, 1960, 2025)	1
Switzerland	Second in 2025	58th	1920	2025	28	Runners-up (1935, 2013, 2018, 2024, 2025)	2
Sweden	Third in 2025	84th	1920	2025	76	Champions (11 times) (Note: Sweden have won in 1953, 1957, 1962, 1987, 1991, 1992, 1998, 2006, 2013, 2017 and 2018.)	4
Denmark	Fourth in 2025	24th	1949	2025	23	Fourth place (2025)	8
Canada	Fifth in 2025	79th	1920	2025	46	Champions (28 times) (Note: Canada have won in 1920, 1924, 1928, 1930, 1931, 1932, 1934, 1935, 1937, 1938, 1939, 1948, 1950, 1951, 1952, 1955, 1958, 1959, 1961, 1994, 1997, 2003, 2004, 2007, 2015, 2016, 2021 and 2023.)	3
Czechia	Sixth in 2025	33rd	1993	2025	33	Champions (1996, 1999, 2000, 2001, 2005, 2010, 2024)	5
Finland	Seventh in 2025	72nd	1939	2025	66	Champions (1995, 2011, 2019, 2022)	6
Austria	Eighth in 2025	38th	1928	2025	5	Third place (1931, 1947)	11
Germany	Ninth in 2025	70th	1928	2025	19	Runners-up (1930, 1953, 2023)	7
Latvia	Tenth in 2025	34th	1933	2025	29	Third place (2023)	10
Slovakia	Eleventh in 2025	30th	1996	2025	30	Champions (2002)	9
Norway	Twelfth in 2025	41st	1937	2025	20	Fourth place (1951)	12
Slovenia	Thirteenth in 2025	12th	2002	2025	2	Thirteenth place (2002, 2005, 2025)	15
Hungary	Fourteenth in 2025	15th	1928	2025	2	Fifth place (1937)	16
Italy	Top two in Division I	33rd	1930	2022	1	Fourth place (1953)	18
Great Britain	Top two in Division I	20th	1924	2024	1	Champions (1936)	17

== Seeding ==
Seeding in the preliminary round was based on the 2025 IIHF World Ranking, at the end of the 2025 IIHF World Championship, using the serpentine system "to allocate a maximum of two teams to separate groups".

Group A (Zurich)

- United States (2)
- Switzerland (3)
- Finland (7)
- Germany (8)
- Latvia (11)
- Austria (12)
- Hungary (18)
- Great Britain (19)

Group B (Fribourg)

- Canada (4)
- Sweden (5)
- Czechia (6)
- Denmark (9)
- Slovakia (10)
- Norway (13)
- Slovenia (17)
- Italy (20)

== Marketing ==
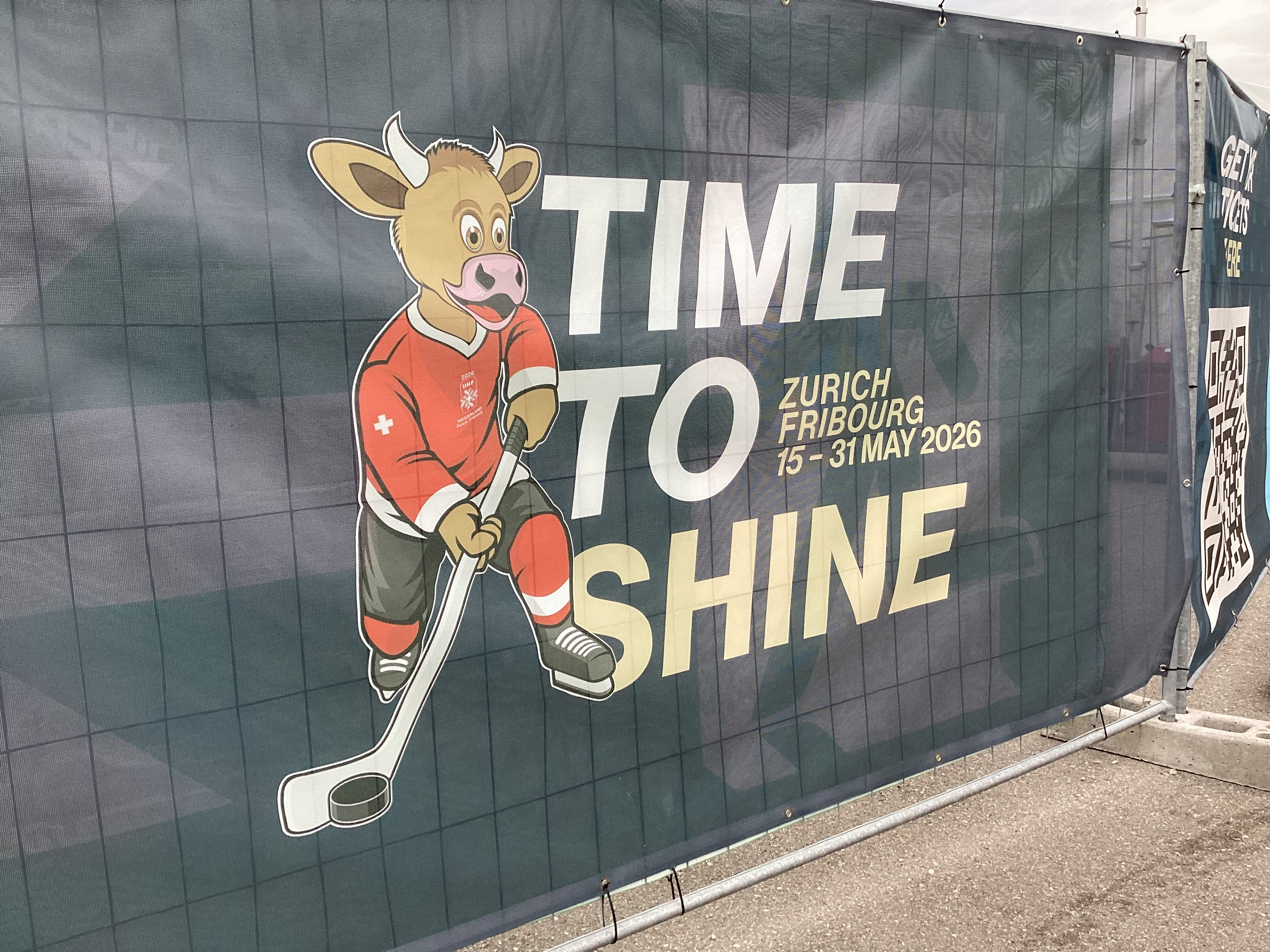
Official mascot Cooly

=== Mascot ===
The mascot of the tournament was a Swiss cow called Cooly. Cooly was originally the mascot of the 2009 IIHF Men's World Championship, the last men's world championship to have been hosted in Switzerland, and has since been the mascot of other sporting events in Switzerland, including the 2014 European Athletic Championships.

=== Slogan ===
The slogan of the tournament was "Time to Shine".

=== Official song ===
"Time to Shine" by Swiss musician Bastian Baker was released on 6 October 2025 as the official song of the 2026 IIHF World Championship. Baker is an ice hockey fan and a former player from Lausanne.

== Match officials ==
16 referees and linespersons were announced on 17 April 2026.

Referees	Linesmen
(Austria) Christian Ofner; (Canada) Taylor Burzminski; (Canada) Jesse Gour; (Czech Republic) Jiří Ondráček; (Finland) Riku Brander; (Finland) Mikko Kaukokari; (Germany) Lukas Kohlmüller; (Germany) André Schrader; (Norway) Marcus Wannerstedt; (Slovakia) Tomáš Hronský; (Sweden) Tobias Björk; (Sweden) Christoffer Holm; (Switzerland) Cedric Borga; (Switzerland) Michael Tscherrig; (United States) Nolan Bloyer; (United States) Sean MacFarlane	(Canada) Brian Birkhoff; (Canada) Mitchell Gibbs; (Czech Republic) Jiří Ondráček; (Czech Republic) Lukáš Rampir; (Finland) Onni Hautamäki; (Finland) Tommi Niittylä; (Germany) Patrick Laguzov; (United Kingdom) Danny Beresford; (Latvia) Renārs Davidonis; (Norway) Njaal Søstumoen; (Slovakia) Oto Durmis; (Sweden) Gustav Jonsson; (Sweden) Anders Nyqvist; (Switzerland) Dominic Schlegel; (United States) Shane Gustafson; (United States) John Rey

== Rosters ==
Each team's roster consisted of at least 15 skaters (forwards and defencemen) and two goaltenders, and at most 22 skaters and three goaltenders. All 16 participating nations, through the confirmation of their respective national associations, had to submit a "Long List" no later than two weeks before the tournament, and a final roster by the Passport Control meeting prior to the start of the tournament.

== Preliminary round ==
The groups were announced on 4 June 2025, with the schedule being revealed on 19 August 2025.

=== Group A ===
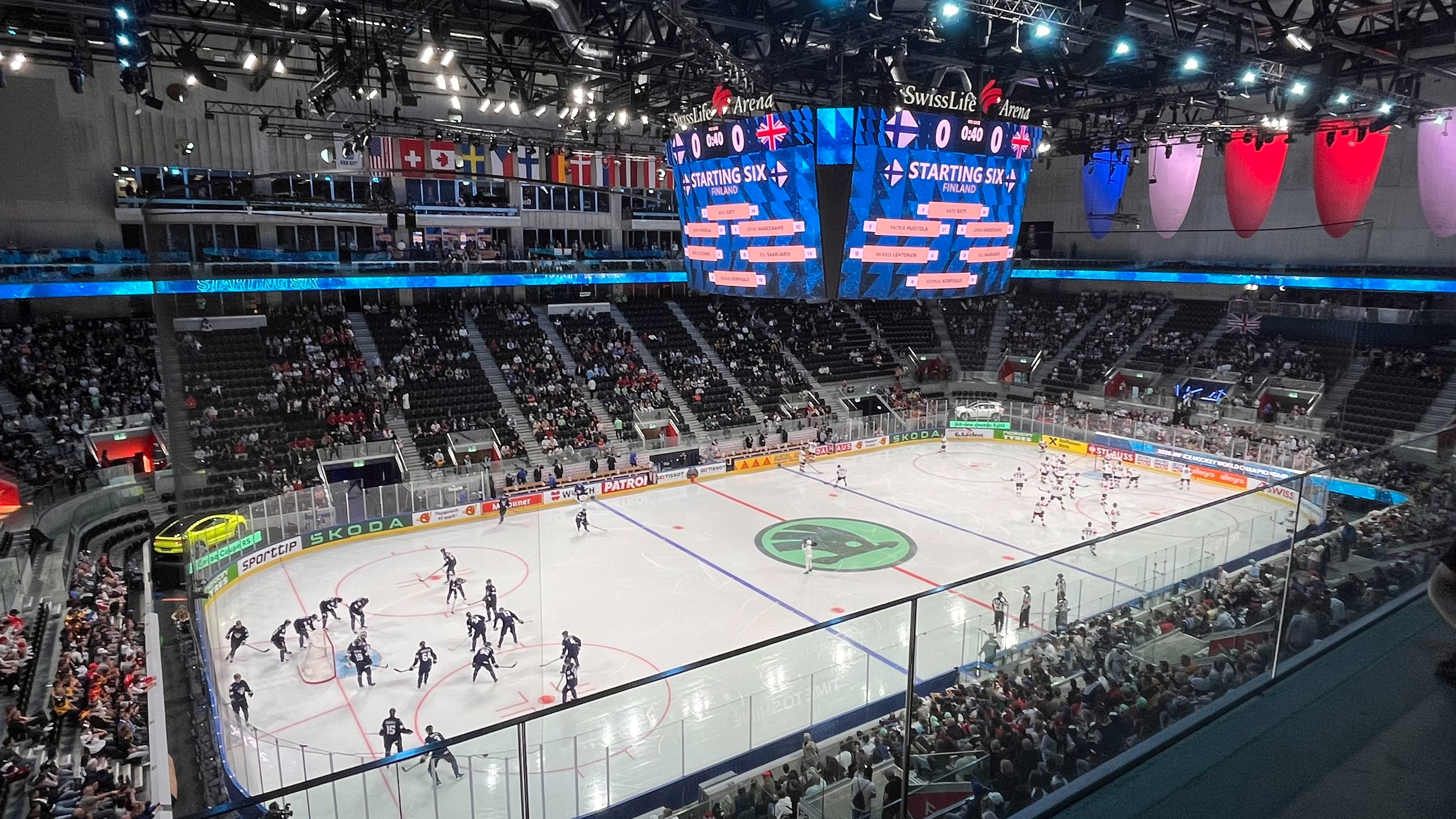
Finland - Great Britain

Pos	Team	Pld	W	OTW	OTL	L	GF	GA	GD	Pts	Qualification or relegation
1	Switzerland (H)	7	7	0	0	0	39	7	+32	21	Quarterfinals
2	Finland	7	6	0	0	1	31	11	+20	18	Quarterfinals
3	Latvia	7	4	0	0	3	24	17	+7	12	Quarterfinals
4	United States	7	3	1	0	3	25	21	+4	11	Quarterfinals
5	Germany	7	3	0	1	3	23	22	+1	10	Qualified for the 2027 IIHF World Championship
6	Austria	7	3	0	0	4	17	29	−12	9	Qualified for the 2027 IIHF World Championship
7	Hungary	7	1	0	0	6	14	38	−24	3	Qualified for the 2027 IIHF World Championship
8	Great Britain	7	0	0	0	7	7	35	−28	0	Relegated to the 2027 Division I A

Source: IIHF
Rules for classification: 1) points; 2) head-to-head points; 3) head-to-head goal difference; 4) head-to-head number of goals scored; 5) result against closest best-ranked team outside tied teams; 6) seeding before tournament
(H) Host

15 May 2026
Finland	3–1	Germany
United States	1–3	Switzerland
16 May 2026
Great Britain	2–5	Austria
Hungary	1–4	Finland
Switzerland	4–2	Latvia
17 May 2026
Great Britain	1–5	United States
Austria	4–2	Hungary
Germany	0–2	Latvia
18 May 2026
Finland	6–2	United States
Germany	1–6	Switzerland
19 May 2026
Latvia	1–3	Austria
Hungary	5–0	Great Britain
20 May 2026
Austria	0–9	Switzerland
United States	4–3 (GWS)	Germany
21 May 2026
Latvia	1–7	Finland
Switzerland	4–1	Great Britain
22 May 2026
Germany	6–2	Hungary
Finland	4–0	Great Britain
23 May 2026
Latvia	4–2	United States
Switzerland	9–0	Hungary
Austria	2–6	Germany
24 May 2026
Great Britain	0–6	Latvia
Finland	5–2	Austria
25 May 2026
United States	7–3	Hungary
Germany	6–3	Great Britain
26 May 2026
Hungary	1–8	Latvia
United States	4–1	Austria
Switzerland	4–2	Finland

=== Group B ===
Pos	Team	Pld	W	OTW	OTL	L	GF	GA	GD	Pts	Qualification or relegation
1	Canada	7	6	1	0	0	33	13	+20	20	Quarterfinals
2	Norway	7	4	1	1	1	25	14	+11	15	Quarterfinals
3	Czechia	7	4	0	1	2	19	17	+2	13	Quarterfinals
4	Sweden	7	4	0	0	3	27	16	+11	12	Quarterfinals
5	Slovakia	7	3	1	0	3	21	19	+2	11	Qualified for the 2027 IIHF World Championship
6	Denmark	7	1	1	1	4	15	26	−11	6 (Note: Denmark 4–0 Slovenia)	Qualified for the 2027 IIHF World Championship
7	Slovenia	7	1	1	1	4	13	25	−12	6	Qualified for the 2027 IIHF World Championship
8	Italy	7	0	0	1	6	5	28	−23	1	Relegated to the 2027 Division I A

Source: IIHF
Rules for classification: 1) points; 2) head-to-head points; 3) head-to-head goal difference; 4) head-to-head number of goals scored; 5) result against closest best-ranked team outside tied teams; 6) seeding before tournament
Notes:

15 May 2026
Canada	5–3	Sweden
Czechia	4–1	Denmark
16 May 2026
Slovakia	2–1	Norway
Italy	0–6	Canada
Slovenia	3–2 (OT)	Czechia
17 May 2026
Italy	1–4	Slovakia
Denmark	2–6	Sweden
Norway	4–0	Slovenia
18 May 2026
Canada	5–1	Denmark
Sweden	3–4	Czechia
19 May 2026
Italy	0–4	Norway
Slovenia	4–5 (GWS)	Slovakia
20 May 2026
Czechia	3–1	Italy
Sweden	6–0	Slovenia
21 May 2026
Canada	6–5 (OT)	Norway
Denmark	1–5	Slovakia
22 May 2026
Canada	3–1	Slovenia
Sweden	3–0	Italy
23 May 2026
Denmark	4–0	Slovenia
Slovakia	2–3	Czechia
Norway	3–2	Sweden
24 May 2026
Denmark	3–2 (GWS)	Italy
Slovakia	1–5	Canada
25 May 2026
Czechia	1–4	Norway
Slovenia	5–1	Italy
26 May 2026
Norway	4–3 (OT)	Denmark
Sweden	4–2	Slovakia
Czechia	2–3	Canada

== Playoff round ==
Teams were reseeded after the quarterfinals.

Quarter-finals
28 May
1A Switzerland	3
4B Sweden	1
28 May
1B Canada	4
4A United States	0
28 May
2A Finland	4
3B Czechia	1
28 May
2B Norway	2
3A Latvia	0

Semi-finals
30 May
1 Switzerland	6
4 Norway	0
30 May
2 Canada	2
3 Finland	4

Final
31 May
1 Switzerland	0
3 Finland (OT)	1
Third place
31 May
2 Canada	2
4 Norway (OT)	3

=== Final ===
31 May 2026; 20:20	Switzerland	0–1 OT (0–0, 0–0, 0–0) (OT: 0–1)	Finland	Swiss Life Arena, Zürich; Attendance: 10,000

Game reference
Leonardo Genoni	Goalies	Justus Annunen	Referees: (Sweden) Tobias Björk (Germany) André Schrader; Linesmen: (Canada) Brian Birkhoff (Sweden) Anders Nyqvist
0–1 / 70:42 – Helenius (Lundell, Lehtonen)			Referees: (Sweden) Tobias Björk (Germany) André Schrader; Linesmen: (Canada) Brian Birkhoff (Sweden) Anders Nyqvist
10 min	Penalties	8 min	Referees: (Sweden) Tobias Björk (Germany) André Schrader; Linesmen: (Canada) Brian Birkhoff (Sweden) Anders Nyqvist
22	Shots	28	Referees: (Sweden) Tobias Björk (Germany) André Schrader; Linesmen: (Canada) Brian Birkhoff (Sweden) Anders Nyqvist

== Final standings ==
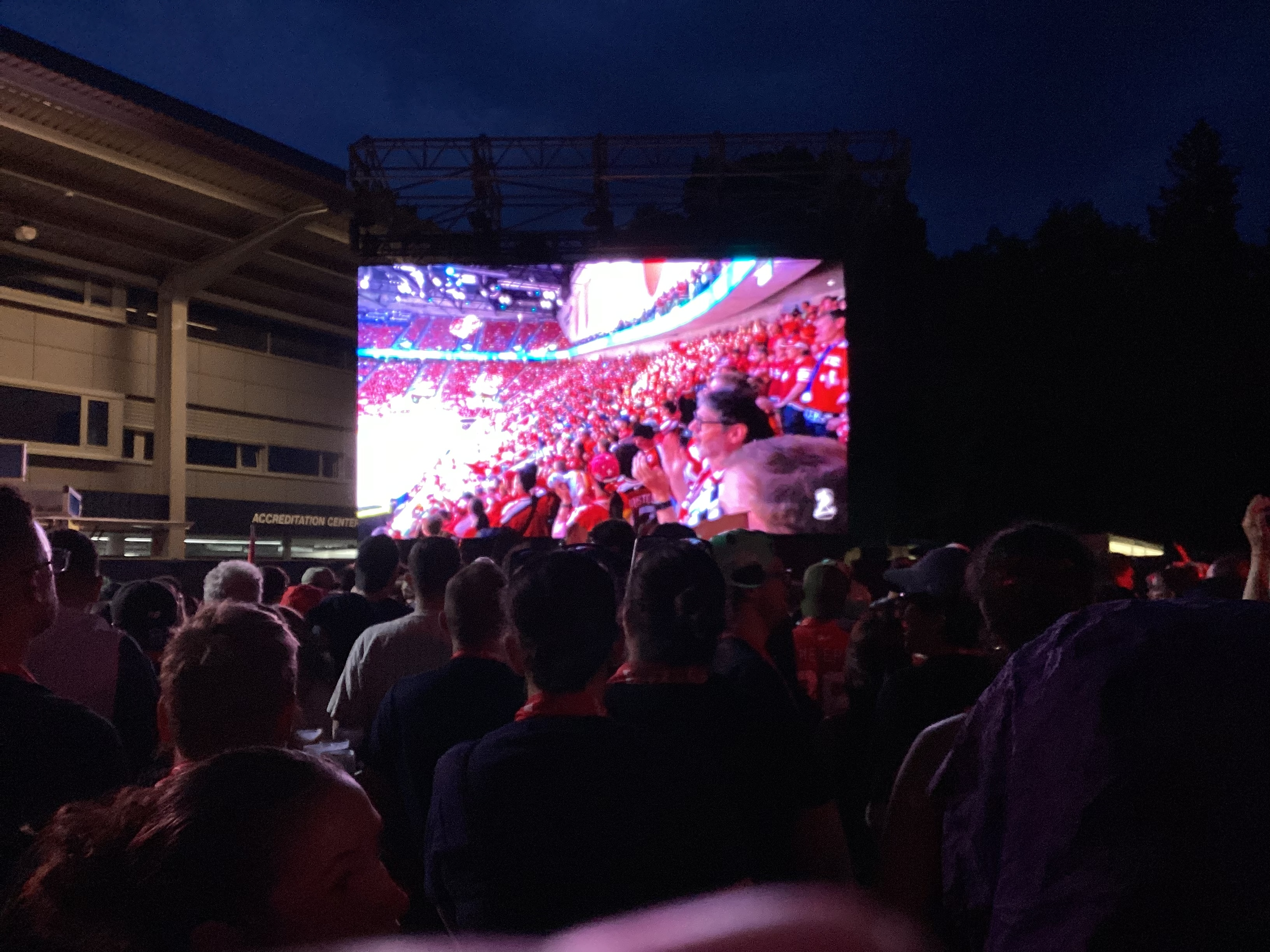
People watching 2026 IIHF world championship Final in Fribourg

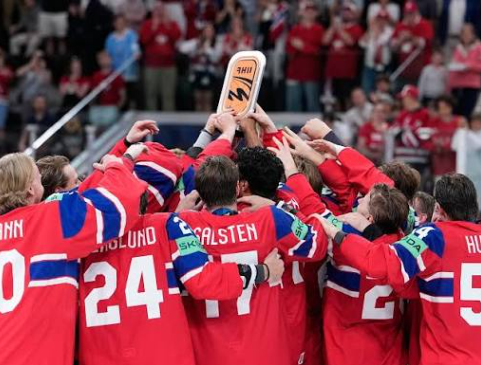
Norway ice Hockey team lifting the bronze IIHF trophy

Teams finishing fifth in the preliminary round were ranked ninth and tenth, teams finishing sixth were ranked 11th and 12th, and so on.

Pos	Grp	Team	Pld	W	OTW	OTL	L	GF	GA	GD	Pts	Final Result
1	A	Finland	10	8	1	0	1	40	14	+26	26	Champions
2	A	Switzerland (H)	10	9	0	1	0	48	9	+39	28	Runners-up
3	B	Norway	10	5	2	1	2	30	22	+8	20	Third place
4	B	Canada	10	7	1	1	1	41	20	+21	24	Fourth place
5	B	Czechia	8	4	0	1	3	20	21	−1	13	Eliminated in Quarterfinals
6	A	Latvia	8	4	0	0	4	24	19	+5	12	Eliminated in Quarterfinals
7	B	Sweden	8	4	0	0	4	28	19	+9	12	Eliminated in Quarterfinals
8	A	United States	8	3	1	0	4	25	25	0	11	Eliminated in Quarterfinals
9	B	Slovakia	7	3	1	0	3	21	19	+2	11	Eliminated in Preliminary round
10	A	Germany	7	3	0	1	3	23	22	+1	10	Eliminated in Preliminary round
11	A	Austria	7	3	0	0	4	17	29	−12	9	Eliminated in Preliminary round
12	B	Denmark	7	1	1	1	4	15	26	−11	6	Eliminated in Preliminary round
13	B	Slovenia	7	1	1	1	4	13	25	−12	6	Eliminated in Preliminary round
14	A	Hungary	7	1	0	0	6	14	38	−24	3	Eliminated in Preliminary round
15	B	Italy	7	0	0	1	6	5	28	−23	1	Relegated to the 2027 IIHF World Championship Division I
16	A	Great Britain	7	0	0	0	7	7	35	−28	0	Relegated to the 2027 IIHF World Championship Division I

Source: IIHF
Rules for classification: 1) position in the group; 2) number of points; 3) goal difference; 4) goals scored; 5) seeding before tournament.
(H) Host

== Statistics ==
=== Scoring leaders ===
List shows the top skaters sorted by points, then goals.

Player	GP	G	A	Pts	+/−	PIM	POS
(Switzerland) Sven Andrighetto	10	4	11	15	+12	6	F
(Canada) Macklin Celebrini	10	6	8	14	+13	4	F
(Switzerland) Denis Malgin	10	5	8	13	+12	2	F
(Switzerland) Roman Josi	10	5	7	12	+15	6	D
(Switzerland) Nico Hischier	10	6	5	11	+10	2	F
(Sweden) Lucas Raymond	8	5	6	11	+4	0	F
(Latvia) Sandis Vilmanis	8	4	7	11	+7	4	F
(Switzerland) Timo Meier	9	3	8	11	+10	6	F
(Finland) Aleksander Barkov	10	3	8	11	+5	2	F
(Latvia) Rūdolfs Balcers	8	7	3	10	+6	2	F

GP = Games played; G = Goals; A = Assists; Pts = Points; +/− = Plus/Minus; PIM = Penalties in Minutes; POS = Position
Source: IIHF.com

=== Goaltending leaders ===
Only the top five goaltenders, based on save percentage, who have played at least 40% of their team's minutes, are included in this list.

Player	TOI	GA	GAA	SA	Sv%	SO
(Switzerland) Leonardo Genoni	430:42	4	0.56	133	97.08	3
(Latvia) Kristers Gudļevskis	416:52	10	1.44	186	94.62	2
(Norway) Henrik Haukeland	483:45	14	1.74	225	93.78	3
(United States) Devin Cooley	341:06	10	1.76	151	93.38	0
(Finland) Justus Annunen	489:38	12	1.47	169	93.37	1

TOI = time on ice (minutes:seconds); SA = shots against; GA = goals against; GAA = goals against average; Sv% = save percentage; SO = shutouts
Source: IIHF.com

== Awards ==
The awards were announced on 31 May 2026.

=== Media All Stars ===
Position	Player
Goaltender	(Switzerland) Leonardo Genoni
Defenceman	(Switzerland) Roman Josi
Defenceman	(Finland) Henri Jokiharju
Forward	(Canada) Macklin Celebrini
Forward	(Switzerland) Sven Andrighetto
Forward	(Finland) Aleksander Barkov
MVP	(Switzerland) Roman Josi

=== Individual awards ===
Position	Player
Goaltender	(Norway) Henrik Haukeland
Defenceman	(Switzerland) Roman Josi
Forward	(Canada) Macklin Celebrini
