= Konsta Helenius =

Finnish ice hockey player (born 2006)

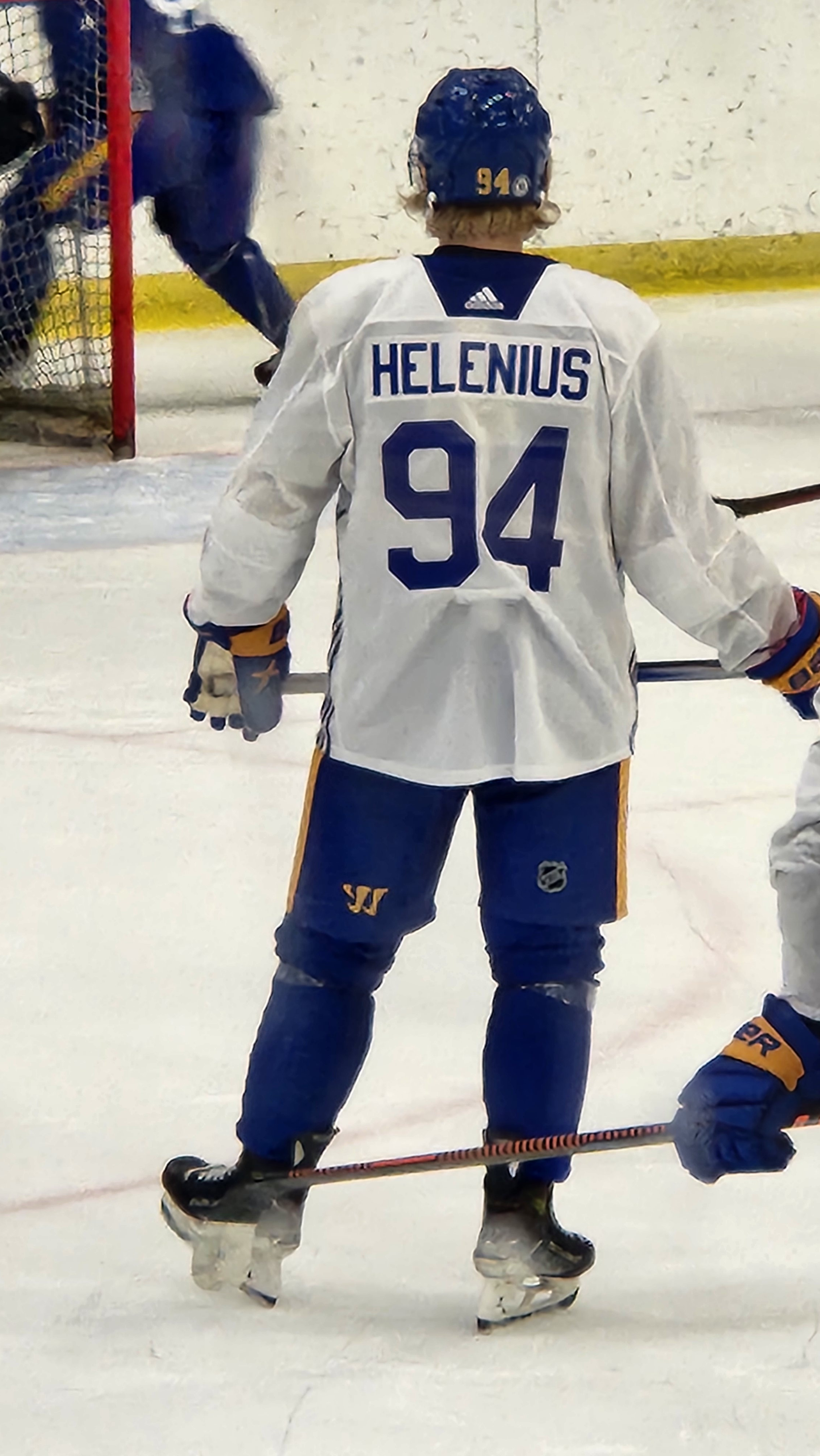
- Helenius in 2024
- Born: 11 May 2006 (age 20) Ylöjärvi, Finland
- Height: 181 cm (5 ft 11 in)
- Weight: 86 kg (190 lb; 13 st 8 lb)
- Position: Forward
- Shoots: Right
- NHL team Former teams: Buffalo Sabres; Jukurit
- National team: Finland
- NHL draft: 14th overall, 2024; Buffalo Sabres
- Playing career: 2022–present

Konsta Helenius (born 11 May 2006) is a Finnish professional ice hockey player who is a forward for the Buffalo Sabres of the National Hockey League (NHL). He was drafted 14th overall by the Sabres in the 2024 NHL entry draft.

== Playing career ==
On 7 February 2024, while playing with Mikkelin Jukurit of the Liiga, Helenius became the second youngest player in Liiga history to record a hat trick, after Tuomo Ruutu, and fifth to do so before the age of 18. He finished the season with 14 goals and 36 points in 51 games. Following the season, he was selected 14th overall in the 2024 NHL entry draft by the Buffalo Sabres, with whom he signed a 3-year entry-level contract on 8 July.

Helenius spent the entire 2024–25 season playing with the Rochester Americans in the AHL. During the 2025–26 season Helenius recorded 30 points (9-G, 21-A) in 34 games with the Rochester Americans en route to being named to the 2026 AHL All-star Classic. On 15 January 2026 Helenius was called up to the Buffalo Sabres later making his NHL debut on 19 January. On 20 January, in his second career NHL game, Helenius scored his first NHL goal, added two assists and was named the first star in a 5–3 win over the Nashville Predators.

Helenius made his playoff debut as a black ace during the 2026 playoffs, scoring his first NHL playoff goal in his second playoff game, a 6–3 loss to the Montreal Canadiens on May 14.

== International play ==
Medal record

Men's ice hockey

Representing Finland

World Championships
Gold medal – first place	2026 Switzerland	

World Junior Championships
Silver medal – second place	2025 Canada	

At the 2024 World Juniors Helenius was the youngest player on the Finnish roster. Helenius once again appeared in the World Juniors in 2025.

Helenius scored the golden goal in overtime against Switzerland in the 2026 IIHF Ice Hockey World Championship grand final. Immediately after scoring, he knocked over two Swiss players in celebration. Helenius was subsequently awarded man of the match.

== Personal life ==
Helenius has a brother Kalle. He is two years older and the two of them played hockey together as well as soccer, badminton, and tennis.

== Career statistics ==
=== Regular season and playoffs ===
			Regular season					Playoffs
Season	Team	League	GP	G	A	Pts	PIM	GP	G	A	Pts	PIM
2022–23	Tappara	U20 SM-sarja	19	8	20	28	10	—	—	—	—	—
2022–23	Jukurit	Liiga	33	3	8	11	8	—	—	—	—	—
2023–24	Jukurit	Liiga	51	14	22	36	10	6	2	4	6	4
2024–25	Rochester Americans	AHL	65	14	21	35	28	8	3	3	6	4
2025–26	Rochester Americans	AHL	63	21	42	63	22	3	2	1	3	0
2025–26	Buffalo Sabres	NHL	9	1	3	4	0	4	2	0	2	0
Liiga totals			84	17	30	47	18	6	2	4	6	4
NHL totals			9	1	3	4	0	4	2	0	2	0

=== International ===
Year	Team	Event	Result	GP	G	A	Pts	PIM
2022	Finland	U17	3rd place, bronze medalist(s)	7	2	9	11	4
2023	Finland	U18	5th	5	2	4	6	0
2024	Finland	WJC	4th	7	1	1	2	2
2024	Finland	U18	5th	5	0	7	7	0
2024	Finland	WC	8th	4	0	1	1	2
2025	Finland	WJC	2nd place, silver medalist(s)	7	0	6	6	0
2026	Finland	WC	1st place, gold medalist(s)	6	3	3	6	4
Junior totals				31	5	27	32	6
Senior totals				10	3	4	7	6

Awards and achievements
Preceded by Zach Benson	Buffalo Sabres first-round draft pick 2024	Succeeded by Radim Mrtka
