= Justus Annunen =

Finnish ice hockey player (born 2000)

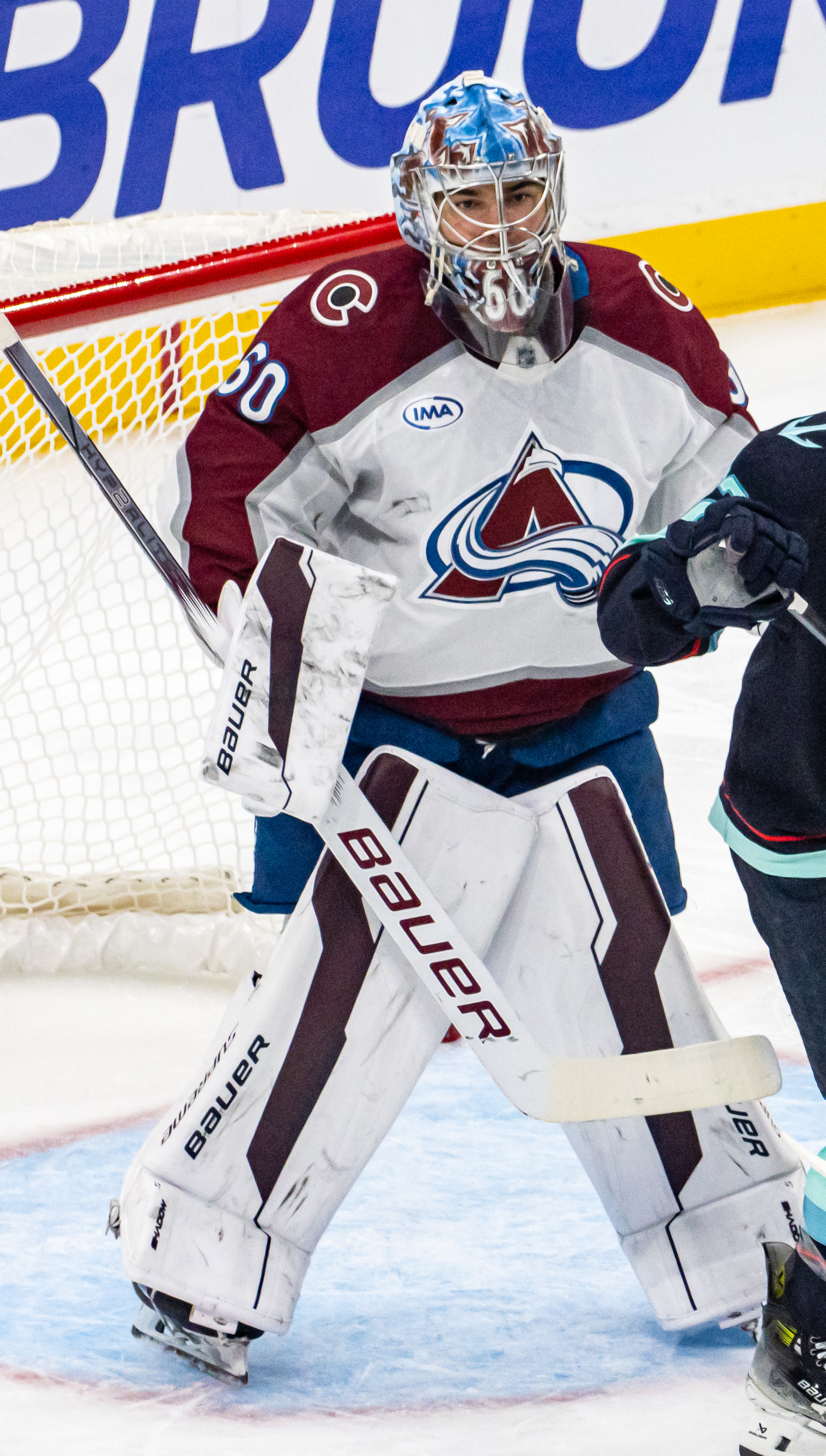
- Born: 11 March 2000 (age 26) Kempele, Finland
- Height: 6 ft 4 in (193 cm)
- Weight: 207 lb (94 kg; 14 st 11 lb)
- Position: Goaltender
- Catches: Left
- NHL team Former teams: Nashville Predators; Oulun Kärpät; Colorado Avalanche
- National team: Finland
- NHL draft: 64th overall, 2018; Colorado Avalanche
- Playing career: 2018–present

Justus Hermanni Annunen (born 11 March 2000), nicknamed "Juice" or "Big Juice", is a Finnish professional ice hockey player who is a goaltender for the Nashville Predators of the National Hockey League (NHL). He was selected by the Colorado Avalanche in the third-round, 64th overall, of the 2018 NHL entry draft.

== Playing career ==
=== Finland ===
Annunen first played as a 14-year old with Kiekko-Laser at the junior under-18 level in 2014. Showing promise at age 16, Annunen joined the ranks of Oulun Kärpät, leading the under-18 team in the 2016–17 season, with 30 appearances. In the 2017–18 season, Annunen played predominantly in the Nuorten SM-liiga, posting a 2.21 goals-against average and .907 save percentage. He made his professional and Liiga debut with Kärpät near the conclusion of the regular season, allowing four goals in 33 shots of a shutout defeat to HPK on 8 March 2018. He returned to the Jr. A to be named as the league's best goalie, a first-team all-star and won a silver medal after the club finished in second place.

With his draft eligible status, Annunen was ranked as the fourth International goalie by the NHL Central Scouting Bureau and was elevated as the third keeper selected, when he was drafted in the third-round, 64th overall, by the Colorado Avalanche in the 2018 NHL entry draft.

In order to continue his development, Annunen was loaned by Kärpät to Mestis club Kokkolan Hermes, to begin the 2018–19 season on 31 July 2018. In 22 appearances with Hermes, he had a 12–7–2 record with a 2.77 goals-against average and .891 save percentage, before he returned to Kärpät mirroring his previous season in making one regular season appearance in a 4–3 overtime defeat to KalPa on 14 March 2019. In the post-season, Annunen was assigned to join Kärpät's Junior team and posted a 1.50 goals-against average and .930 save percentage in six appearances to help the team capture the Jr. A SM-liiga championship.

In the 2019–20 season, Annunen was slated to play in the Liiga to serve as the backup to Patrik Rybár. He collected his first Liiga win in a 3–2 decision in his opening game against KalPa on 12 September 2019. On 16 September 2019, Annunen was signed to an improved two-year contract extension to solidify his role in the Liiga. From September 21 to October 23, Annunen collected four consecutive shutouts to establish a new league record for the longest shutout streak during a single season (302 minutes, five seconds). Sharing the goaltending duties with Rybár for the regular season leading Kärpät, Annunen posted a 15–5–3 record in 23 games, ranking first among all goaltenders in both save percentage (.929) and goals-against average (1.77). With the season ended prematurely before the commencement of the playoffs due to the COVID-19 pandemic, Annunen finished the season third in voting for the Urpo Ylönen trophy as the league's best goalkeeper.

=== Colorado Avalanche ===
On 30 April 2020, Annunen was signed by his draft club, the Colorado Avalanche, to a three-year, entry-level contract. He was assigned to continue his development and tenure with Oulun Kärpät for the 2020–21 season. Unable to match his previous seasons numbers, Annunen played in a career high 24 regular season games, collecting seven wins and recording a 2.43 goals-against average and a .880 save percentage. He lost both playoff games as seventh-seeded Oulun Kärpät bowed out of the post-season after a quarterfinal defeat to HIFK. On 6 May 2021, Annunen was reassigned by the Avalanche to begin his North American career with AHL affiliate, the Colorado Eagles, for the remainder of their season.

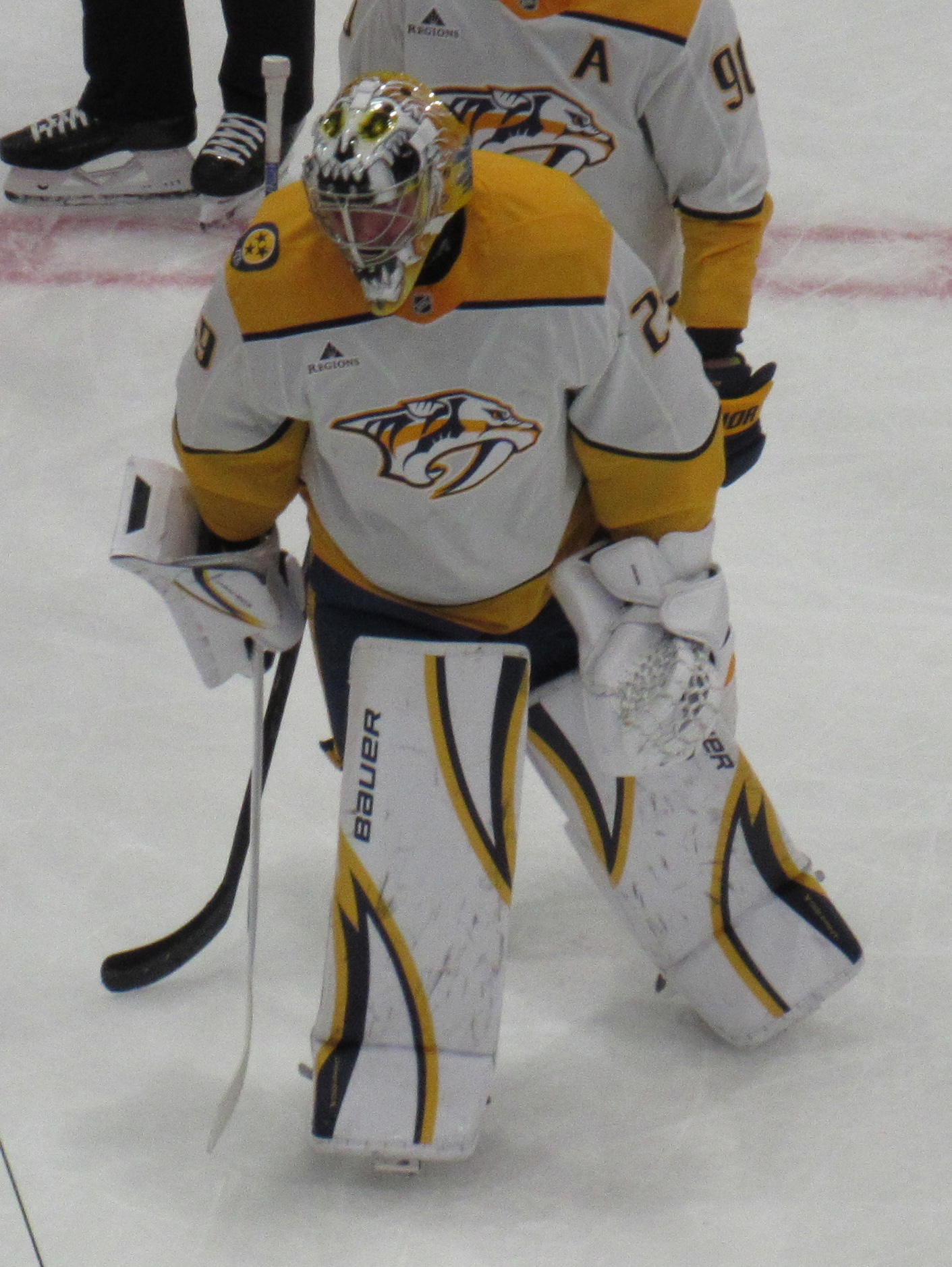
Annunen with the Predators in 2026

Annunen continued with the Eagles to begin the following 2021–22 season, assigned by the Avalanche to assume the starting goaltender role. Adapting to the North American rink and style, Annunen was winless in his first 8 career AHL contests before earning a 5–4 overtime victory against the San Jose Barracuda on 29 October 2021. He quickly improved to collect the AHL's November Goaltender of the Month honors in posting a 5–1–2 record. On 1 December, Annunen received his first NHL recall on emergency conditions, after starting goaltender Darcy Kuemper went down with injury. He joined the Avalanche in time for the second period, assuming the backup duties for the remainder of an 8–2 defeat to the Toronto Maple Leafs. Continuing as backup with the Avalanche on their Canadian road trip, on 4 December 2021, Annunen made his NHL debut with the Avalanche, appearing in relief of goaltender Jonas Johansson and allowing two goals on 19 shots including the overtime winner of a 6–5 defeat by the Ottawa Senators. Annunen achieved his first NHL win on 6 December when the Avalanche defeated the Philadelphia Flyers 7–5.

Annunen was called up by the Avalanche during the 2022 Stanley Cup playoffs dressing for 13 May after an eye injury to Darcy Kuemper. Annunen dressed for two games in the Western Conference Finals when Kuemper had an upper body injury. However, he did not play in a game. He shared in the team's eventual Stanley Cup win. He was given a Stanley Cup ring but did not dress in the finals, resulting in his name not being put on the Cup.

In the 2024–25 season, Annunen made the Avalanche roster out training camp, solidifying his role as the backup to Alexandar Georgiev. Splitting duties with Georgiev through the first two months of the season, Annunen started 9 games and made 11 appearances, posting a 6 wins through the first two months of the campaign.

=== Nashville Predators ===
On 30 November 2024, Annunen was traded, along with a sixth-round selection in the 2025 NHL entry draft, to divisional rivals the Nashville Predators in exchange for Scott Wedgewood. His new backup position behind Predators goaltender Juuse Saros, who shared the same nickname of "Juice" with him, generated some confusion. However, the problem was solved by giving Annunen the nickname of "Big Juice", referencing the 5 inch size difference between the two.

== International play ==
Medal record

Representing Finland

Ice hockey

World Championships
Gold medal – first place	2026 Switzerland	

World U18 Championships
Gold medal – first place	2018 Russia	

Annunen first represented Finland at the 2017 Ivan Hlinka Memorial Tournament before competing at the 2018 IIHF World U18 Championships, the latter of which he helped Finland to a gold medal. He posted a 2.00 goals-against average and .914 save percentage in six games at the under-18 tournament.

Annunen represented his country at the 2020 World Junior Championships, where he finished the tournament with a .916 save percentage and a 2.65 goals-against average in six contests. His 362:01 minutes in net was the second-most among all goaltenders in the tournament.

Annunen was the main starting goaltender for Finland in the 2026 World Championship. He had a strong performance, with a 7–1–0 record, 1.47 goals-against-average, and a .933 save percentage, ultimately helping his team to win the gold medal.

== Career statistics ==
=== Regular season and playoffs ===
			Regular season									Playoffs
Season	Team	League	GP	W	L	OT	MIN	GA	SO	GAA	SV%	GP	W	L	MIN	GA	SO	GAA	SV%
2017–18	Oulun Kärpät	Jr. A	26	19	5	0	1516	52	4	2.31	.907	12	8	4	728	22	2	1.83	.935
2017–18	Oulun Kärpät	Liiga	1	0	1	0	60	4	0	4.00	.892	—	—	—	—	—	—	—	—
2018–19	Hermes	Mestis	22	12	7	2	1149	61	1	2.77	.891	—	—	—	—	—	—	—	—
2018–19	Oulun Kärpät	Liiga	1	0	0	1	61	4	0	4.00	.818	—	—	—	—	—	—	—	—
2018–19	Oulun Kärpät	Jr. A	—	—	—	—	—	—	—	—	—	6	5	1	359	9	1	1.50	.930
2019–20	Oulun Kärpät	Liiga	23	15	5	3	1358	40	6	1.77	.929	—	—	—	—	—	—	—	—
2020–21	Oulun Kärpät	Liiga	24	7	9	7	1384	56	1	2.43	.880	2	0	2	129	6	0	2.80	.861
2020–21	Colorado Eagles	AHL	2	0	1	1	123	6	0	2.93	.900	1	0	1	58	3	0	3.08	.909
2021–22	Colorado Eagles	AHL	48	24	13	6	2693	135	2	3.01	.893	9	6	3	561	23	0	2.46	.923
2021–22	Colorado Avalanche	NHL	2	1	0	1	97	7	0	4.34	.863	—	—	—	—	—	—	—	—
2022–23	Colorado Eagles	AHL	41	22	10	8	2379	101	1	2.55	.916	3	2	1	186	12	0	3.87	.886
2022–23	Colorado Avalanche	NHL	2	1	1	0	118	7	0	3.58	.854	—	—	—	—	—	—	—	—
2023–24	Colorado Eagles	AHL	23	14	5	4	1360	60	0	2.65	.908	—	—	—	—	—	—	—	—
2023–24	Colorado Avalanche	NHL	14	8	4	1	801	30	2	2.25	.928	—	—	—	—	—	—	—	—
2024–25	Colorado Avalanche	NHL	11	6	4	0	521	28	0	3.23	.872	—	—	—	—	—	—	—	—
2024–25	Nashville Predators	NHL	23	9	11	1	1269	67	0	3.17	.888	—	—	—	—	—	—	—	—
2025–26	Nashville Predators	NHL	28	10	12	2	1501	66	1	2.64	.907	—	—	—	—	—	—	—	—
Liiga totals			49	22	15	11	2,863	104	7	2.18	.906	2	0	2	129	6	0	2.80	.861
NHL totals			80	35	32	5	4,306	205	3	2.87	.899	—	—	—	—	—	—	—	—

=== International ===
Year	Team	Event	Result	GP	W	L	T	MIN	GA	SO	GAA	SV%
2016	Finland	U17	7th	3	1	2	0	176	9	0	3.05	.904
2017	Finland	IH18	6th	3	1	2	0	174	9	0	3.10	.871
2018	Finland	U18	1st place, gold medalist(s)	6	6	0	0	360	12	1	2.00	.914
2020	Finland	WJC	4th	6	2	3	1	362	16	1	2.65	.916
2026	Finland	WC	1st place, gold medalist(s)	8	7	1	0	490	12	1	1.47	.934
Junior totals				18	10	7	1	1,072	46	2	2.57	.911
Senior totals				8	7	1	0	490	12	1	1.47	.934

== Awards and honours ==
Award	Year	Ref
Jr. A
Jorma Valtonen Award	2018	
First All-Star Team	2018	
Champion	2019	
