= Swiss Life Arena =

Ice hockey arena in Zürich, Switzerland

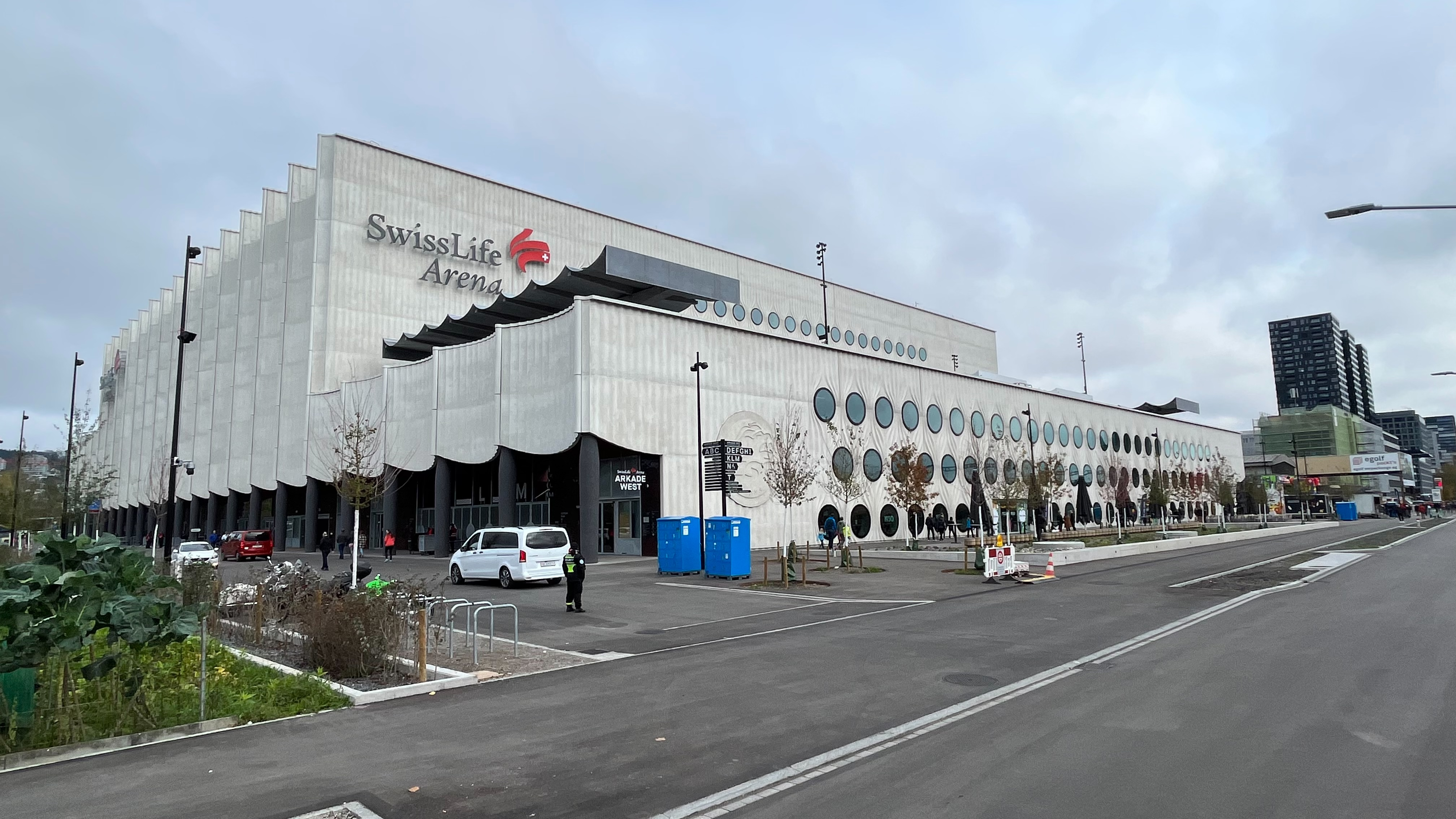
- Pictured in 2022
- Interactive map of Swiss Life Arena
- Location: Altstetten, Zürich, Switzerland
- Coordinates: 47°23′43.33″N 8°28′48.11″E
- Capacity: 11,157

Construction
- Groundbreaking: March 2019
- Opened: 18 October 2022 (first ice hockey game); 19 November 2022 (official inauguration)
- Cost: CHF 169 million (US$ 187.6 million)
- Architect: Caruso St John
- Project manager: Michael Schneider

Tenant
- ZSC Lions (NL) (2022–present)

The Swiss Life Arena is an ice hockey and entertainment arena in the Altstetten quarter of Zürich, Switzerland. It is located approximately seven kilometers west of downtown Zürich. The arena officially opened in October 2022. The ZSC Lions won their first game in the Swiss Life Arena on 18 October 2022, with a 2–1 victory over HC Fribourg-Gottéron.

The arena currently serves as the home for the ZSC Lions of the National League (NL) and seats up to 12,000 spectators for hockey games.

== Background ==
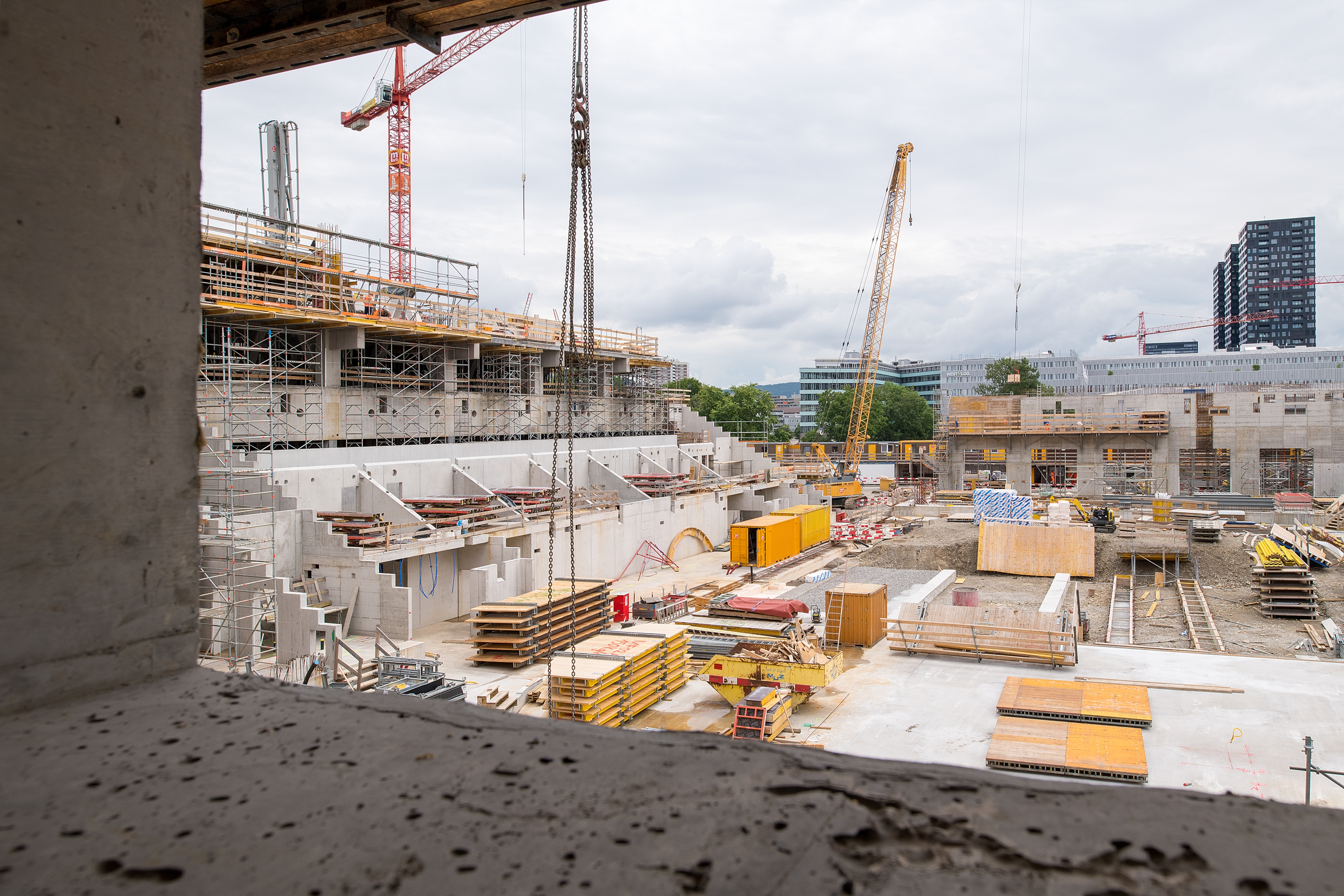
Swiss Life Arena under construction in September 2020

Starting in the 2022/2023 season, the Swiss Life Arena became be the new arena of the ZSC Lions’ national league A-team, which will play as many as 40 national and international matches there every year. The arena will also host games of GCK/ZSC Lions young talent.

The Swiss Life Arena was designed to be a multifunctional event space with modern infrastructure. With its steeply graded seating and compact construction, the arena is a “cauldron”, with a focus on sports and corporate events.

Swiss Life, a Swiss provider of pension and financial solutions, will lend its name to the arena. The former Swisslife Arena in Lucerne has been operating under the name "Eiszentrum Luzern" since 2014, after the name sponsorship with Swiss Life expired at the end of 2012.

== Funding ==
The estimated cost for the Swiss Life Arena is about CHF 169 million. The funding is as follows : CHF 30 million from equity, CHF 19 million from third parties and the remaining CHF 120 million come as a loan from the city of Zürich. The ZSC Lions will also receive, along with operating income, an urban operating contribution of CHF 2 million per year. Profits will mostly be used for amortization and strengthening of equity.

== Opening ==
The ZSC Lions played their inaugural game at Swiss Life Arena during the regular season against HC Fribourg-Gottéron on 18 October 2022. The home team won the game, 2–1, in a sold-out arena.

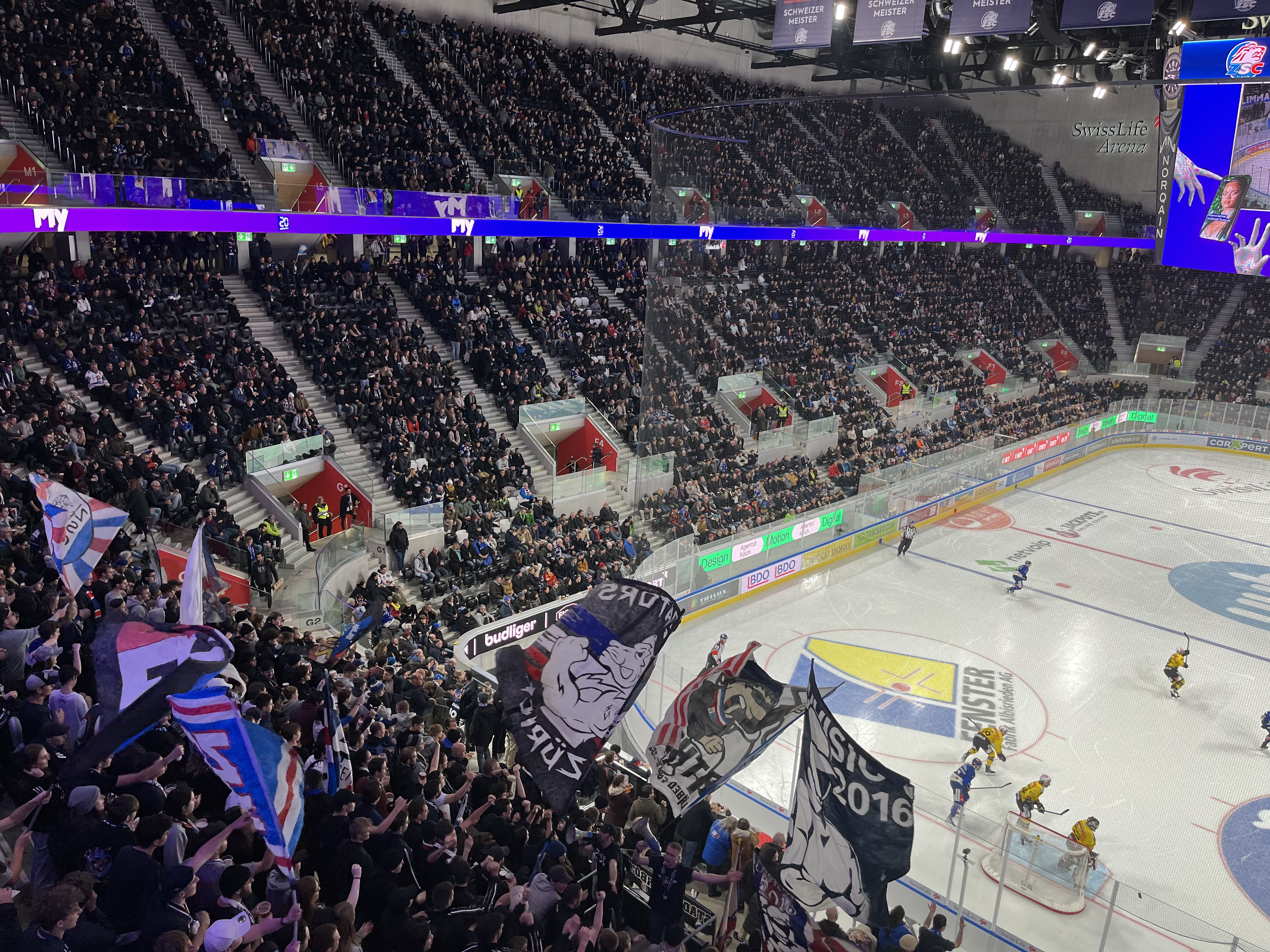
Sold-out, double-decker back straight during a game between the ZSC Lions and SC Bern (2022)

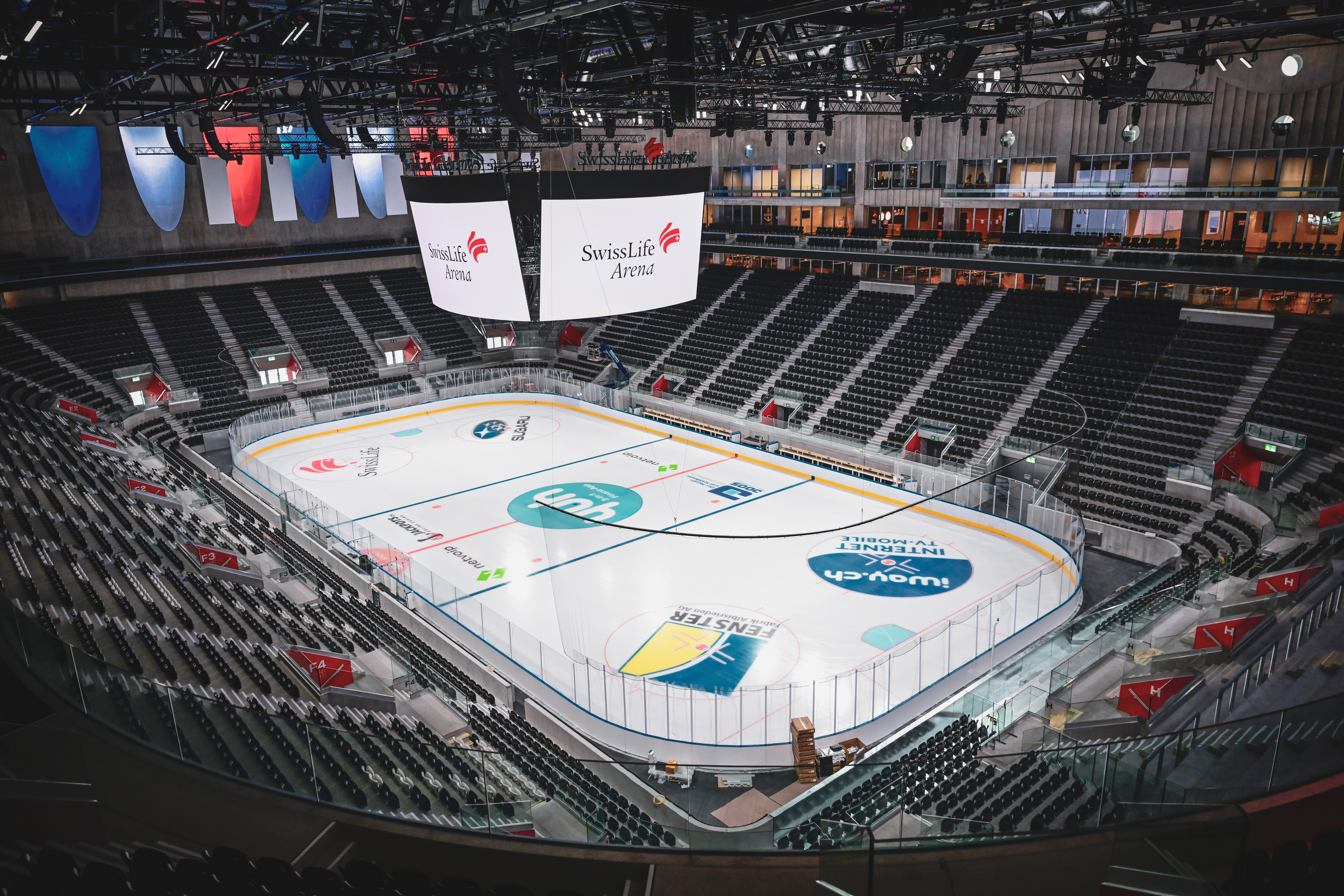
The arena's “cauldron” shortly before opening (October 2022)

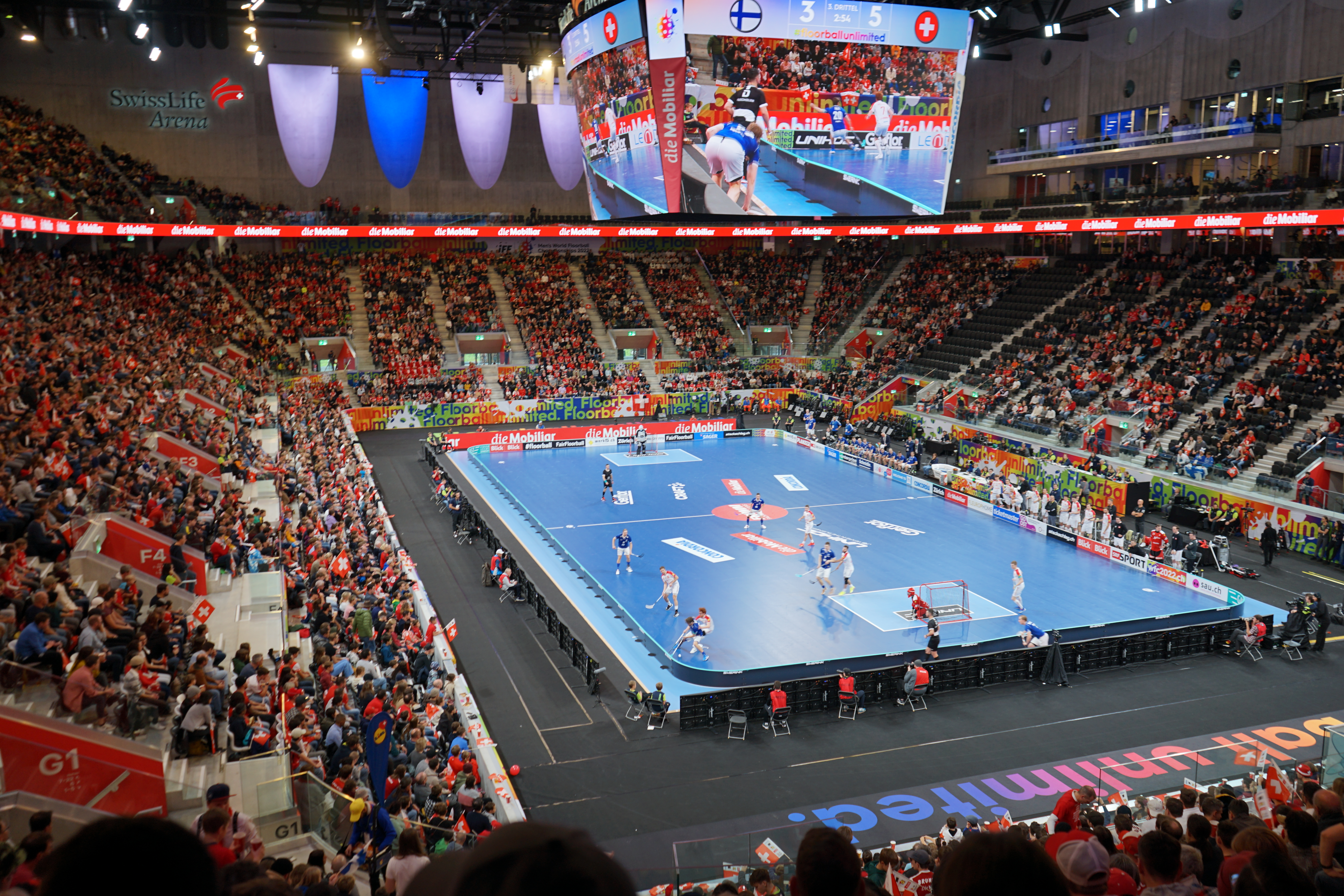
Venue of the 2022 Men's World Floorball Championships.In

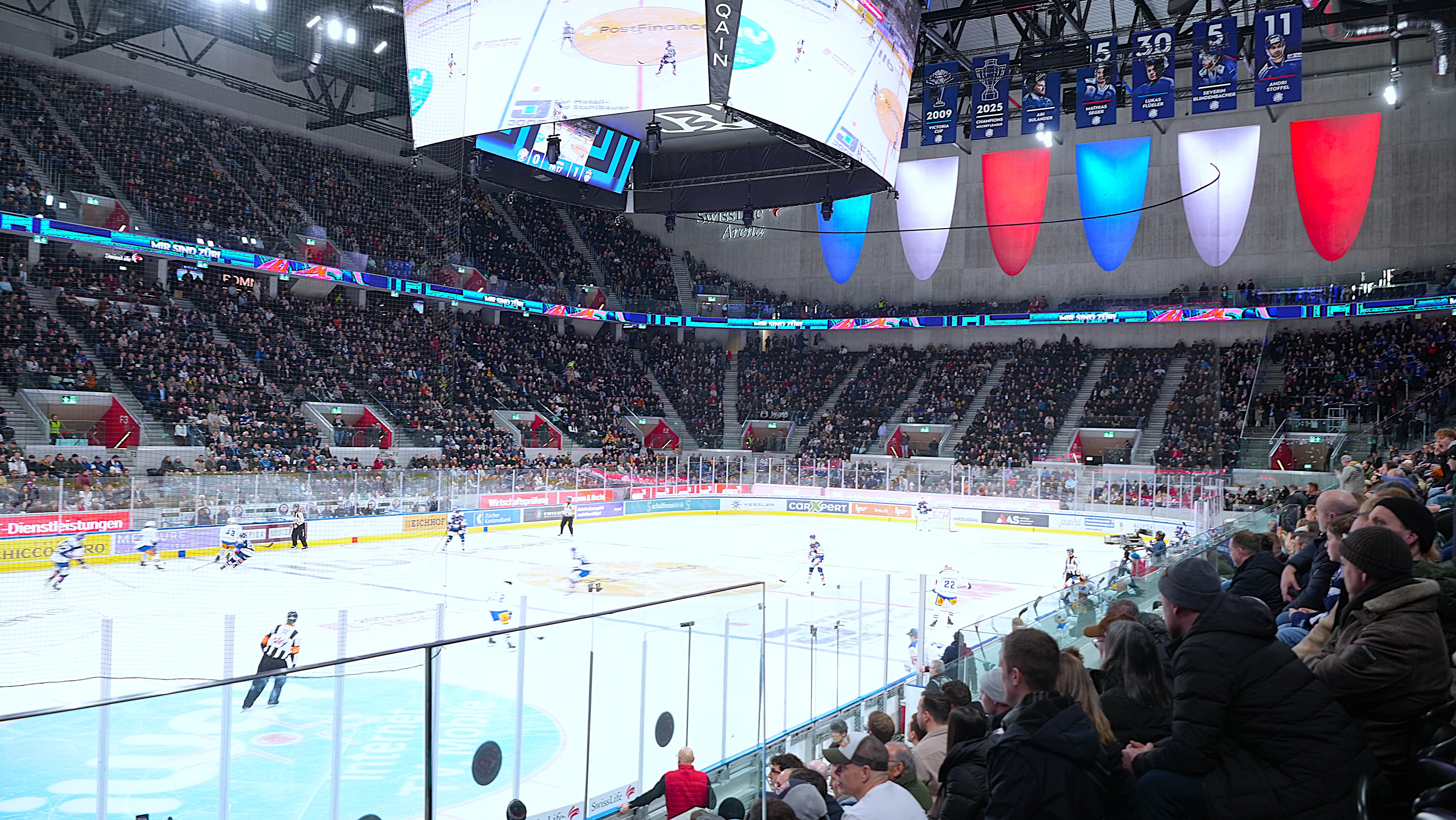
Ice hockey in the Swiss National League: The ZSC Lions are playing against EV Zug on 31 January 2026 at the Swiss Life Arena.

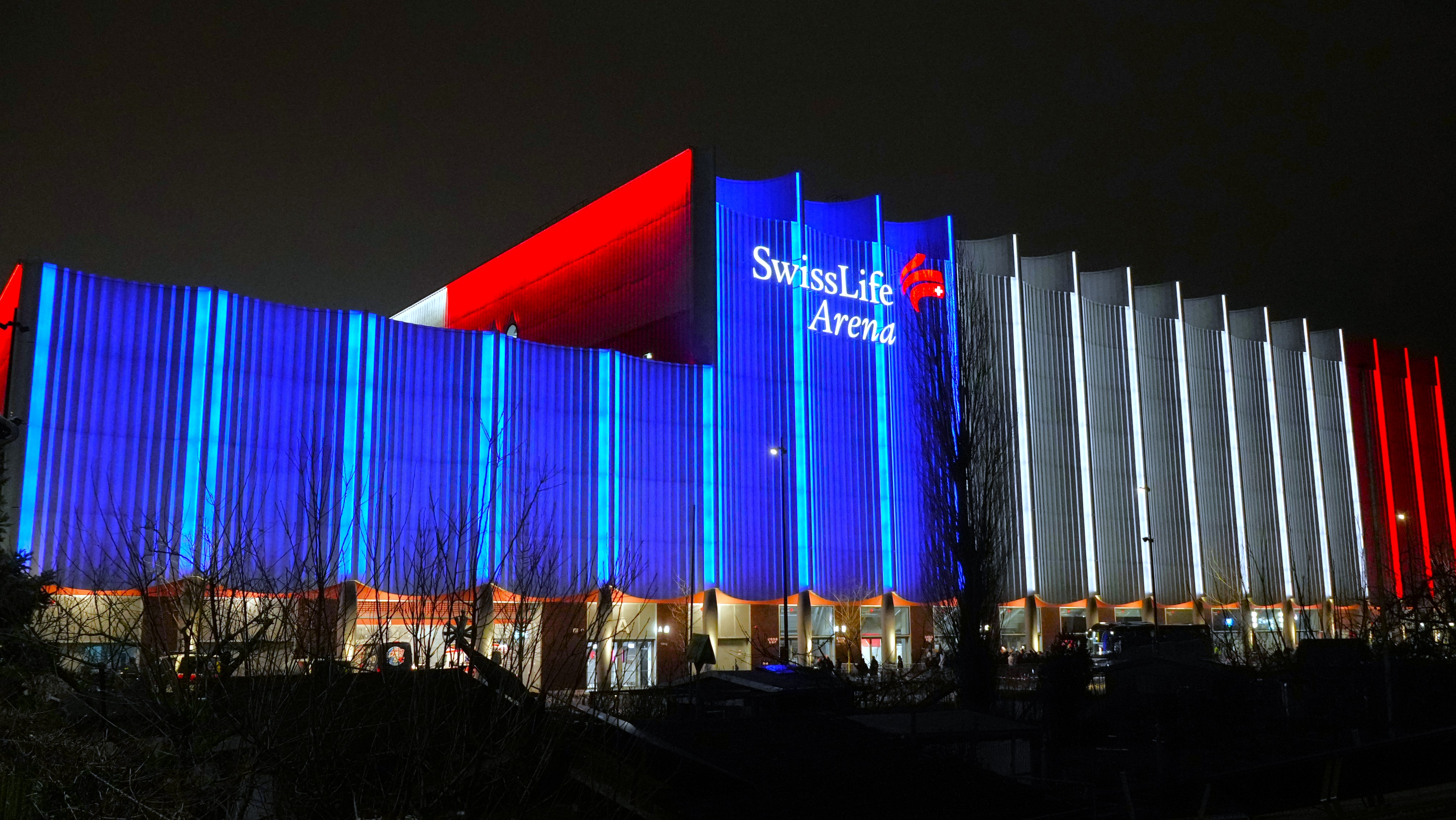
Venue of the 2026 IIHF Ice Hockey World Championship. The tournament will be played in Swiss Life Arena, Zurich and BCF Arena, Fribourg.

== Events ==
The venue will host matches for the 2028 European Men's Handball Championship. In 2026, Switzerland will host the 2026 IIHF World Championship with Zürich's Swiss Life Arena as the main venue.

== See also ==
- List of indoor arenas in Switzerland
