= 2025 IIHF World Championship Group B =

Ice hockey tournament group stage

Group B was one of two groups of the 2025 IIHF World Championship. The four best-placed teams advanced to the playoff round, while the last placed team was relegated to Division I in 2026.

== Standings ==
Pos	Team	Pld	W	OTW	OTL	L	GF	GA	GD	Pts	Qualification or relegation
1	Switzerland	7	6	0	1	0	34	9	+25	19	Quarterfinals
2	United States	7	5	1	0	1	34	14	+20	17 (Note: Czechia 2–5 United States)	Quarterfinals
3	Czechia	7	5	1	0	1	35	14	+21	17	Quarterfinals
4	Denmark (H)	7	3	1	0	3	25	24	+1	11	Quarterfinals
5	Germany	7	3	0	1	3	20	22	−2	10	Qualified for the 2026 IIHF World Championship
6	Norway	7	1	0	1	5	13	24	−11	4	Qualified for the 2026 IIHF World Championship
7	Hungary	7	1	0	0	6	8	39	−31	3 (Note: Kazakhstan 2–4 Hungary)	Qualified for the 2026 IIHF World Championship
8	Kazakhstan	7	1	0	0	6	9	32	−23	3	Relegated to the 2026 Division I A

Source: IIHF
Rules for classification: 1) points; 2) head-to-head points; 3) head-to-head goal difference; 4) head-to-head number of goals scored; 5) result against closest best-ranked team outside tied teams; 6) result against second-best-ranked team outside tied teams; 7) seeding before tournament
(H) Host

== Matches ==
All times are local (UTC+2).

=== Switzerland vs Czechia ===
9 May 2025; 16:20	Switzerland	4–5 OT (2–1, 0–2, 2–1) (OT: 0–1)	Czechia	Jyske Bank Boxen, Herning; Attendance: 10,500

Game reference

Leonardo Genoni
Goalies
Karel Vejmelka
Referees:
(Latvia) Andris Ansons
(Sweden) Tobias Björk
Linesmen:
(Finland) Onni Hautamäki
(Sweden) Anders Nyqvist

Marti (Hofmann, Fora) – 01:34	1–0
Riat (Siegenthaler, Kukan) – 17:50	2–0
	2–1	19:41 – Stránský (Pastrňák, Červenka) (PP2)
	2–2	26:01 – Zadina (Krejčík, M. Špaček)
	2–3	35:33 – Pyrochta (Zadina, D. Špaček)
Schmid (Moy, Hofmann) (PP) – 41:21	3–3
Andrighetto (Marti, Malgin) – 49:00	4–3
	4–4	56:13 – Sedlák (Červenka, Hronek) (PP)
	4–5	62:30 – Červenka (Pastrňák, Vejmelka)

6 min
Penalties
4 min
20
Shots
29

=== Denmark vs United States ===
9 May 2025; 20:20	Denmark	0–5 (0–1, 0–2, 0–2)	United States	Jyske Bank Boxen, Herning; Attendance: 10,500

Game reference

Frederik Dichow
Goalies
Joey Daccord
Referees:
(Sweden) Christoffer Holm
(Finland) Miko Kaukokari
Linesmen:
(Slovakia) Oto Durmis
(Canada) Tarrington Wyonzek

0–1	17:52 – Gauthier (Kesselring)
0–2	23:59 – Cooley (Garland, Thompson) (PP)
0–3	28:32 – Beniers (Peeke, Lohrei)
0–4	49:31 – Lohrei (Kesselring, Nazar)
0–5	56:16 – Beniers (Gauthier, Smith)

8 min
Penalties
6 min
26
Shots
48

=== Norway vs Kazakhstan ===
10 May 2025; 12:20	Norway	1–2 (1–0, 0–1, 0–1)	Kazakhstan	Jyske Bank Boxen, Herning; Attendance: 3,588

Game reference

Tobias Normann
Goalies
Maxim Pavlenko
Referees:
(Slovakia) Peter Stano
(Finland) Kristian Vikman
Linesmen:
(United Kingdom) Danny Beresford
(Germany) Patrick Laguzov

Johannesen (Elvsveen, Salsten) – 05:33	1–0
	1–1	25:08 – Starchenko (Mikhailis, Orekhov) (PP)
	1–2	52:08 – Volkov (Asetov, Kaiyrzhan)

8 min
Penalties
8 min
31
Shots
21

=== Germany vs Hungary ===
10 May 2025; 16:20	Germany	6–1 (2–0, 2–0, 2–1)	Hungary	Jyske Bank Boxen, Herning; Attendance: 6,184

Game reference

Philipp Grubauer
Goalies
Bence Bálizs
Referees:
(Finland) Mikko Kaukokari
(Austria) Christian Ofner
Linesmen:
(Finland) Onni Hautamäki
(Sweden) Anders Nyqvist

Kahun (Schütz, Stachowiak) – 10:54	1–0
Samanski (Reichel) – 16:09	2–0
Kalble (Kastner) – 34:09	3–0
Tiffels (Reichel, Samanski) – 39:44	4–0
Ehl (Hager, Müller) – 45:54	5–0
	5–1	48:29 – Ambrus (Ortenszky, Hári)
Kahun (Schütz, Stachowiak) – 59:09	6–1

4 min
Penalties
8 min
35
Shots
19

=== Denmark vs Switzerland ===
10 May 2025; 20:20	Denmark	2–5 (0–1, 2–2, 0–2)	Switzerland	Jyske Bank Boxen, Herning; Attendance: 10,095

Game reference

Sebastian Dahm
Goalies
Stéphane Charlin
Referees:
(Sweden) Mikael Holm
(Canada) Mike Langin
Linesmen:
(United States) Nick Briganti
(Czech Republic) Jiří Ondráček

	0–1	14:41 – Hischier (Marti, Fora)
Fisker Mølgaard (SH) – 22:09	1–1
Blichfeld (Aagaard, Olesen) – 28:59	2–1
	2–2	35:40 – Moy (Hischier, Meier)
	2–3	38:34 – Moy (Meier)
	2–4	45:19 – Riat (Moy, Schmid) (PP)
	2–5	58:49 – Hischier (Schmid) (ENG)

8 min
Penalties
8 min
15
Shots
35

=== United States vs Hungary ===
11 May 2025; 12:20	United States	6–0 (2–0, 1–0, 3–0)	Hungary	Jyske Bank Boxen, Herning; Attendance: 4,041

Game reference

Jeremy Swayman
Goalies
Ádám Vay
Referees:
(Latvia) Andris Ansons
(Slovakia) Peter Stano
Linesmen:
(United Kingdom) Danny Beresford
(Germany) Patrick Laguzov

Nazar (Cooley, Garland) – 14:07	1–0
Nazar (Pinto, Lohrei) – 16:54	2–0
Gauthier (Beniers, Smith) – 30:02	3–0
Gauthier (Smith, Vlasic) – 41:13	4–0
Garland (Pinto, Nazar) – 41:54	5–0
Cooley (Keller, Thompson) – 54:26	6–0

4 min
Penalties
6 min
39
Shots
13

=== Germany vs Kazakhstan ===
11 May 2025; 16:20	Germany	4–1 (1–1, 1–0, 2–0)	Kazakhstan	Jyske Bank Boxen, Herning; Attendance: 4,733

Game reference

Mathias Niederberger
Goalies
Maxim Pavlenko
Referees:
(Sweden) Tobias Björk
(Austria) Christian Ofner
Linesmen:
(Czech Republic) Jiří Ondráček
(Canada) Tarrington Wyonzek

	0–1	03:05 – Mikhailis (Shestakov)
Kastner (Ehl, Seider) – 13:09	1–1
Stachowiak (Kahun, Schütz) – 34:53	2–1
Reichel (Tiffels, Kälble) – 41:49	3–1
Kälble (Ehl, Kastner) – 45:33	4–1

4 min
Penalties
0 min
33
Shots
21

=== Norway vs Czechia ===
11 May 2025; 20:20	Norway	1–2 (0–0, 1–2, 0–0)	Czechia	Jyske Bank Boxen, Herning; Attendance: 4,791

Game reference

Jonas Arntzen
Goalies
Karel Vejmelka
Referees:
(Canada) Mike Langin
(Finland) Kristian Vikman
Linesmen:
(United States) Nick Briganti
(Slovakia) Oto Durmis

	0–1	22:14 – Flek (Krejčík, Lauko)
Solberg (Berglund, Salsten) – 28:03	1–1
	1–2	33:20 – Pastrňák (Červenka, Hronek)

6 min
Penalties
6 min
23
Shots
33

=== United States vs Switzerland ===
12 May 2025; 16:20	United States	0–3 (0–2, 0–0, 0–1)	Switzerland	Jyske Bank Boxen, Herning; Attendance: 5,741

Game reference

Joey Daccord
Goalies
Leonardo Genoni
Referees:
(Sweden) Tobias Björk
(Canada) Mike Langin
Linesmen:
(Germany) Patrick Laguzov
(Sweden) Anders Nyqvist

0–1	12:46 – Riat (Berni)
0–2	15:59 – Siegenthaler (Fiala, Moy)
0–3	51:51 – Kukan (Malgin, Andrighetto)

4 min
Penalties
4 min
23
Shots
27

=== Czechia vs Denmark ===
12 May 2025; 20:20	Czechia	7–2 (0–0, 4–1, 3–1)	Denmark	Jyske Bank Boxen, Herning; Attendance: 9,882

Game reference

Daniel Vladař
Goalies
Frederik Dichow
Referees:
(Slovakia) Peter Stano
(Finland) Kristian Vikman
Linesmen:
(Finland) Onni Hautamaki
(Canada) Tarrington Wyonzek

Nečas (Beránek, Hronek) – 23:35	1–0
Gazda (Kodytek, Beránek) – 24:23	2–0
Pastrňák (Sedlák, Vladař) – 33:52	3–0
Sedlák (Pastrňák, Hronek) – 36:21	4–0
	4–1	38:47 – Olesen (Russell, N. Jensen)
Nečas (Zadina, Špaček) – 44:32	5–1
	5–2	46:24 – Wejse (N. Jensen, Olesen)
Voženílek (Flek, Lauko) (EN) – 57:43	6–2
Červenka (Pastrňák, Sedlák) – 59:01	7–2

8 min
Penalties
8 min
33
Shots
31

=== Norway vs Germany ===
13 May 2025; 16:20	Norway	2–5 (1–2, 0–2, 1–1)	Germany	Jyske Bank Boxen, Herning; Attendance: 3,622

Game reference

Jonas Arntzen
Goalies
Philipp Grubauer
Referees:
(Latvia) Andris Ansons
(Finland) Riku Brander
Linesmen:
(United Kingdom) Danny Beresford
(United States) Nick Briganti

	0–1	04:51 – Ehliz (Stützle, Michaelis)
	0–2	16:10 – Michaelis (Ehliz, Wagner) (SH)
Martinsen (Brandsegg-Nygård, Johannesen) (PP) – 19:50	1–2
	1–3	24:56 – Stachowiak (Kahun)
	1–4	26:46 – Samanski (Reichel, Kälble)
Berglund (Salsten, Olsen) – 47:07	2–4
	2–5	59:43 – Tiffels (Kahun, Stützle) (PP, EN)

12 min
Penalties
8 min
31
Shots
30

=== Kazakhstan vs Hungary ===
13 May 2025; 20:20	Kazakhstan	2–4 (0–2, 1–0, 1–2)	Hungary	Jyske Bank Boxen, Herning; Attendance: 1,972

Game reference

Maxim Pavlenko
Goalies
Bence Bálizs
Referees:
(Sweden) Christoffer Holm
(Austria) Christian Ofner
Linesmen:
(Slovakia) Oto Durmis
(Latvia) Dāvis Zunde

	0–1	00:15 – Hári (Nilsson, M. Horváth)
	0–2	18:31 – Terbócs (B. Horváth)
Mikhailis (Orekhov, Shestakov) (PP) – 34:32	1–2
	1–3	40:14 – Galló (Hári, Erdély)
	1–4	43:35 – Vincze (Papp, Hári) (PP)
Orekhov (Shestakov, Starchenko) (PP, EA) – 59:01	2–4

8 min
Penalties
10 min
25
Shots
28

=== United States vs Norway ===
14 May 2025; 16:20	United States	6–5 OT (4–1, 1–2, 0–2) (OT: 1–0)	Norway	Jyske Bank Boxen, Herning; Attendance: 3,149

Game reference

Jeremy Swayman
Goalies
Tobias Normann
Referees:
(Sweden) Christoffer Holm
(Austria) Christian Ofner
Linesmen:
(Finland) Onni Hautamäki
(Canada) Tarrington Wyonzek

Gauthier (Pinto, Smith) – 04:50	1–0
Keller (LaCombe, Kesselring) – 07:18	2–0
	2–1	09:59 – Solberg (Berglund, Brandsegg-Nygård) (PP)
Thompson – 12:34	3–1
McCarron (O'Connor, Howard) – 17:50	4–1
Thompson (Keller, Werenski) (PP) – 22:55	5–1
	5–2	26:59 – Solberg (Martinsen) (PP2)
	5–3	32:48 – Rønnild
	5–4	51:08 – Steen
	5–5	58:33 – Solberg (Brandsegg-Nygård, Martinsen) (EA)
Thompson (Cooley, Keller) (PP) – 64:09	6–5

10 min
Penalties
10 min
39
Shots
18

=== Kazakhstan vs Denmark ===
14 May 2025; 20:20	Kazakhstan	1–5 (0–0, 0–2, 1–3)	Denmark	Jyske Bank Boxen, Herning; Attendance: 10,388

Game reference

Maxim Pavlenko
Goalies
Frederik Dichow
Referees:
(Latvia) Andris Ansons
(Canada) Mike Langin
Linesmen:
(Germany) Patrick Laguzov
(Sweden) Anders Nyqvist

	0–1	24:20 – Aagaard (Blichfeld, Koch)
	0–2	32:57 – True (Russell, N. Jensen) (PP)
Mikhailis (Starchenko, Metalnikov) – 46:33	1–2
	1–3	50:08 – Wejse (Olesen, Blichfeld) (PP)
	1–4	50:28 – True (Lauridsen)
	1–5	59:53 – Olesen (EN)

6 min
Penalties
10 min
22
Shots
27

=== Switzerland vs Germany ===
15 May 2025; 16:20	Switzerland	5–1 (0–0, 4–0, 1–1)	Germany	Jyske Bank Boxen, Herning; Attendance: 5,391

Game reference

Leonardo Genoni
Goalies
Mathias Niederberger
Referees:
(Sweden) Tobias Björk
(Finland) Kristian Vikman
Linesmen:
(Slovakia) Oto Durmis
(Czech Republic) Daniel Hynek

Riat (Jäger, Marti) – 24:25	1–0
Andrighetto (Siegenthaler, Malgin) – 25:49	2–0
Andrighetto (Fiala, Malgin) (EA) – 33:51	3–0
Andrighetto (Kukan, Malgin) (PP) – 34:53	4–0
Andrighetto (Kukan, Malgin) (PP) – 48:15	5–0
	5–1	58:35 – Müller (Kahun, Schütz) (PP)

8 min
Penalties
10 min
32
Shots
22

=== Czechia vs Hungary ===
15 May 2025; 20:20	Czechia	6–1 (2–0, 1–1, 3–0)	Hungary	Jyske Bank Boxen, Herning; Attendance: 2,939

Game reference

Daniel Vladař
Goalies
Ádám Vay
Referees:
(Finland) Riku Brander
(Slovakia) Peter Stano
Linesmen:
(United Kingdom) Danny Beresford
(United States) Nick Briganti

Pastrňák (Červenka, Sedlák) – 17:30	1–0
Flek (Voženílek)– 19:23	2–0
Kodytek (Hronek, Voženílek) – 29:43	3–0
	3–1	35:27 – Mihalik (Vincze, Ortenszky)
Pastrňák (Krejčík, Gazda) – 43:42	4–1
Beránek (Zadina, Krejčík) (PP) – 46:19	5–1
Sedlák (Červenka, Pastrňák) – 47:38	6–1

2 min
Penalties
8 min
32
Shots
12

=== Hungary vs Denmark ===
16 May 2025; 16:20	Hungary	2–8 (2–1, 0–3, 0–4)	Denmark	Jyske Bank Boxen, Herning; Attendance: 10,022

Game reference

Bence Bálizs
Ádám Vay
Goalies
Frederik Dichow
Sebastian Dahm
Referees:
(Latvia) Andris Ansons
(Slovakia) Peter Stano
Linesmen:
(Finland) Onni Hautamäki
(Germany) Patrick Laguzov

Vincze (Hári, Nilsson) (PP) – 00:33	1–0
Mihalik (Szabó, Ortenszky) – 06:23	2–0
	2–1	13:22 – Aagaard (Olesen, Lauridsen) (PP)
	2–2	27:37 – Lauridsen
	2–3	34:23 – J. Jensen (Bau, Bruggisser)
	2–4	34:49 – Russell (Olesen, Lassen)
	2–5	43:41 – Aagaard (Mølgaard, Blichfeld)
	2–6	48:45 – Bau (True)
	2–7	49:13 – Aagaard (Mølgaard, Blichfeld)
	2–8	52:53 – Lauridsen (Mølgaard, N. Jensen) (PP)

12 min
Penalties
8 min
12
Shots
41

=== Switzerland vs Norway ===
16 May 2025; 20:20	Switzerland	3–0 (2–0, 1–0, 0–0)	Norway	Jyske Bank Boxen, Herning; Attendance: 3,837

Game reference

Stéphane Charlin
Goalies
Jonas Arntzen
Referees:
(Sweden) Christoffer Holm
(Finland) Kristian Vikman
Linesmen:
(Czech Republic) Daniel Hynek
(Sweden) Anders Nyqvist

Andrighetto (Kukan, Malgin) (PP) – 08:56	1–0
Hofmann (Moy, Knak) – 14:15	2–0
Moy (Meier, Fora) – 28:03	3–0

8 min
Penalties
10 min
28
Shots
12

=== United States vs Germany ===
17 May 2025; 12:20	United States	6–3 (3–0, 0–3, 3–0)	Germany	Jyske Bank Boxen, Herning; Attendance: 9,595

Game reference

Joey Daccord
Goalies
Philipp Grubauer
Mathias Niederberger
Referees:
(Latvia) Andris Ansons
(Sweden) Christoffer Holm
Linesmen:
(United Kingdom) Danny Beresford
(Finland) Onni Hautamäki

Thompson (Werenski, Garland) (PP) – 01:42	1–0
Nazar (Gauthier) – 09:43	2–0
O'Connor (Thompson) – 14:17	3–0
	3–1	28:43 – Mik (Samanski, Hüttl)
	3–2	34:43 – Müller (Kahun, Stachowiak)
	3–3	35:31 – Stachowiak (Michaelis, Hüttl) (PP)
Garland (Keller, Cooley) (PP) – 44:50	4–3
Cooley (Garland, Keller) – 56:31	5–3
Keller (Nazar, Garland) (EN) – 58:07	6–3

4 min
Penalties
10 min
44
Shots
21

=== Czechia vs Kazakhstan ===
17 May 2025; 16:20	Czechia	8–1 (1–0, 3–0, 4–1)	Kazakhstan	Jyske Bank Boxen, Herning; Attendance: 7,112

Game reference

Karel Vejmelka
Goalies
Jelal-ad-Din Amirbekov
Maxim Pavlenko
Referees:
(Canada) Mike Langin
(Finland) Kristian Vikman
Linesmen:
(United States) Nick Briganti
(Canada) Tarrington Wyonzek

Stránský (Beránek, Pyrochta) – 05:19	1–0
Flek (Gazda, Klapka) – 21:26	2–0
Stránský (D. Špaček, M. Špaček) – 32:19	3–0
Červenka (Pastrňák, Krejčík) – 37:04	4–0
Klapka – 41:06	5–0
	5–1	47:36 – Kolesnikov (Muratov, Breus) (PP)
Červenka (Pyrochta, Pastrňák) – 53:13	6–1
Červenka (Nečas, Sedlák) – 55:44	7–1
Klapka (Flek, Gazda) – 59:22	8–1

6 min
Penalties
8 min
33
Shots
22

=== Denmark vs Norway ===
17 May 2025; 20:20	Denmark	6–3 (2–1, 3–1, 1–1)	Norway	Jyske Bank Boxen, Herning; Attendance: 10,500

Game reference

Frederik Dichow
Goalies
Jonas Arntzen
Tobias Normann
Referees:
(Sweden) Tobias Björk
(Finland) Riku Brander
Linesmen:
(Slovakia) Oto Durmis
(Sweden) Anders Nyqvist

Russell (Mølgaard, Blichfeld) (PP2) – 13:42	1–0
Aagaard (N. Jensen, Mølgaard) (PP) – 14:38	2–0
	2–1	15:14 – Salsten (Solberg, Berglund)
Røndbjerg (Russell, N. Jensen) – 27:25	3–1
Blichfeld (Bruggisser, Wejse) (PP) – 30:32	4–1
Røndbjerg – 34:59	5–1
	5–2	36:59 – Berglund
Olesen (Blichfeld, Wejse) (PP) – 49:46	6–2
	6–3	59:37 – Olsen (Johnsen, Solberg) (PP)

6 min
Penalties
37 min
47
Shots
27

=== Kazakhstan vs United States ===
18 May 2025; 16:20	Kazakhstan	1–6 (0–0, 0–5, 1–1)	United States	Jyske Bank Boxen, Herning; Attendance: 3,968

Game reference

Sergei Kudryavtsev
Maxim Pavlenko
Goalies
Jeremy Swayman
Referees:
(Slovakia) Peter Stano
(Finland) Kristian Vikman
Linesmen:
(Czech Republic) Daniel Hynek
(Sweden) Anders Nyqvist

	0–1	26:58 – Nazar (LaCombe, Eyssimont)
	0–2	31:46 – LaCombe (Nazar, McCarron)
	0–3	34:00 – Thompson (Buium, Pinto)
	0–4	34:58 – Beniers (O'Connor)
	0–5	39:04 – Kesselring (Nazar, Eyssimont)
	0–6	45:54 – Werenski (Kesselring, Keller)
Volkov (SH) – 59:10	1–6

4 min
Penalties
4 min
17
Shots
38

=== Hungary vs Switzerland ===
18 May 2025; 20:20	Hungary	0–10 (0–2, 0–3, 0–5)	Switzerland	Jyske Bank Boxen, Herning; Attendance: 2,846

Game reference

Ádám Vay
Goalies
Leonardo Genoni
Referees:
(Finland) Riku Brander
(Austria) Christian Ofner
Linesmen:
(United Kingdom) Danny Beresford
(United States) Nick Briganti

0–1	05:44 – Ambühl (Egli, Moser)
0–2	07:25 – Meier (Kukan)
0–3	31:57 – Egli (Glauser, Fiala)
0–4	33:24 – Meier (Moy, Fiala)
0–5	35:21 – Moser (Baechler, Meier)
0–6	50:03 – Egli (Moser, Meier)
0–7	50:51 – Ambühl (Schmid, Marti)
0–8	54:49 – Glauser (Jäger, Knak)
0–9	58:53 – Ambühl (Fora, Moser)
0–10	59:20 – Fiala (Moy, Marti)

6 min
Penalties
4 min
6
Shots
37

=== Germany vs Czechia ===
19 May 2025; 16:20	Germany	0–5 (0–1, 0–2, 0–2)	Czechia	Jyske Bank Boxen, Herning; Attendance: 8,221

Game reference

Mathias Niederberger
Goalies
Daniel Vladař
Referees:
(Sweden) Tobias Björk
(Sweden) Christoffer Holm
Linesmen:
(Finland) Onni Hautamäki
(Canada) Tarrington Wyonzek

0–1	05:51 – Pastrňák (Nečas, Červenka) (PP)
0–2	26:43 – Sedlák (Pastrňák, Červenka)
0–3	29:07 – Flek (Voženílek, Krejčík)
0–4	40:43 – Lauko (SH)
0–5	56:40 – Flek (Nečas, Hronek)

4 min
Penalties
4 min
19
Shots
25

=== Hungary vs Norway ===
19 May 2025; 20:20	Hungary	0–1 (0–1, 0–0, 0–0)	Norway	Jyske Bank Boxen, Herning; Attendance: 2,808

Game reference
Bence Bálizs	Goalies	Tobias Normann	Referees: (Latvia) Andris Ansons (Canada) Mike Langin; Linesmen: (Slovakia) Oto Durmis (Germany) Patrick Laguzov
0–1 / 06:28 – Steen (Brandsegg-Nygård)			Referees: (Latvia) Andris Ansons (Canada) Mike Langin; Linesmen: (Slovakia) Oto Durmis (Germany) Patrick Laguzov
8 min	Penalties	12 min	Referees: (Latvia) Andris Ansons (Canada) Mike Langin; Linesmen: (Slovakia) Oto Durmis (Germany) Patrick Laguzov
17	Shots	25	Referees: (Latvia) Andris Ansons (Canada) Mike Langin; Linesmen: (Slovakia) Oto Durmis (Germany) Patrick Laguzov

=== Switzerland vs Kazakhstan ===
20 May 2025; 12:20	Switzerland	4–1 (0–1, 1–0, 3–0)	Kazakhstan	Jyske Bank Boxen, Herning; Attendance: 3,833

Game reference

Stéphane Charlin
Goalies
Maxim Pavlenko
Referees:
(Austria) Christian Ofner
(Finland) Kristian Vikman
Linesmen:
(Slovakia) Oto Durmis
(Sweden) Anders Nyqvist

	0–1	15:17 – Shestakov (Beketayev, Mikhailis)
Fiala (Malgin, Kukan) (PP) – 39:55	1–1
Andrighetto (Malgin, Moser) (PP) – 47:15	2–1
Ambühl (Niederreiter, Fiala) – 57:06	3–1
Riat (Knak, Fora) – 57:44	4–1

4 min
Penalties
6 min
39
Shots
16

=== Czechia vs United States ===
20 May 2025; 16:20	Czechia	2–5 (0–1, 2–0, 0–4)	United States	Jyske Bank Boxen, Herning; Attendance: 8,441

Game reference

Karel Vejmelka
Goalies
Jeremy Swayman
Referees:
(Sweden) Tobias Björk
(Canada) Mike Langin
Linesmen:
(Finland) Onni Hautamäki
(Canada) Tarrington Wyonzek

	0–1	09:25 – Doan (Peeke, Pinto)
Pastrňák (Červenka) – 20:41	1–1
Nečas (Pastrňák, Sedlák) (PP) – 28:33	2–1
	2–2	41:35 – Nazar (Buium, Beniers) (PP)
	2–3	47:01 – Nazar (Gauthier, Beniers) (PP)
	2–4	53:29 – Cooley (Keller, Werenski)
	2–5	57:06 – Peeke (O'Connor) (EN)

22 min
Penalties
18 min
27
Shots
56

=== Germany vs Denmark ===
20 May 2025; 20:20	Germany	1–2 GWS (0–0, 1–0, 0–1) (OT: 0–0) (SO: 0–1)	Denmark	Jyske Bank Boxen, Herning; Attendance: 10,500

Game reference
Philipp Grubauer	Goalies	Frederik Dichow	Referees: (Latvia) Andris Ansons (Sweden) Christoffer Holm; Linesmen: (United States) Nick Briganti (Czech Republic) Daniel Hynek
Geibel (Wagner, Samanski) – 39:14 / 1–0; / 1–1 / 50:00 – Ehlers (Mølgaard, Olesen)			Referees: (Latvia) Andris Ansons (Sweden) Christoffer Holm; Linesmen: (United States) Nick Briganti (Czech Republic) Daniel Hynek
Schutz (miss); Pföderl (miss); Stützle (miss); Kahun (miss)	Shootout	Olesen; Blichfeld; (miss) Ehlers; (miss) N. Jensen	Referees: (Latvia) Andris Ansons (Sweden) Christoffer Holm; Linesmen: (United States) Nick Briganti (Czech Republic) Daniel Hynek
8 min	Penalties	10 min	Referees: (Latvia) Andris Ansons (Sweden) Christoffer Holm; Linesmen: (United States) Nick Briganti (Czech Republic) Daniel Hynek
26	Shots	27	Referees: (Latvia) Andris Ansons (Sweden) Christoffer Holm; Linesmen: (United States) Nick Briganti (Czech Republic) Daniel Hynek
