= 2025 IIHF World Championship playoff round =

Round of 2025 international ice hockey tournament

The playoff round of the 2025 IIHF World Championship was held from 22 to 25 May 2025. The top four of each preliminary group qualified for the playoff round.

== Qualified teams ==
Group	Winners	Runners-up	Third place	Fourth place
A	Canada	Sweden	Finland	Austria
B	Switzerland	United States	Czechia	Denmark

=== Qualified teams' seedings ===
Quarter-finalists were paired according to their positions in the groups: the first-placed team in each preliminary-round group played the fourth-place team of the other group, while the second-placed team played the third-place team of the other group. If a matchup would be Denmark versus Sweden, the pairings would have been played in their groups (A1 vs A4 and so on).

Semi-finalists were paired according to their seeding after the preliminary round, which was determined by the following criteria. The best-ranked semi-finalist played against the lowest-ranked semi-finalist, while the second-best ranked semi-finalist played the third-best ranked semi-finalist.

Rank	Team	Grp	Pos	Pts	GD	GF	Seed
1	Canada	A	1	19	+27	34	1
2	Switzerland	B	1	19	+25	34	5
3	Sweden	A	2	18	+20	28	7
4	United States	B	2	17	+20	34	6
5	Czechia	B	3	17	+21	35	4
6	Finland	A	3	16	+12	22	3
7	Denmark	B	4	11	+1	25	11
8	Austria	A	4	10	+3	21	13

Classification rules: 1) position in the group; 2) number of points; 3) goal difference; 4) number of goals scored for; 5) seeding number entering the tournament.

== Bracket ==
There was a re-seeding after the quarterfinals.

Quarter-finals
22 May
1A Canada	1
4B Denmark	2
22 May
1B Switzerland	6
4A Austria	0
22 May
2A Sweden	5
3B Czechia	2
22 May
2B United States	5
3A Finland	2

Semi-finals
24 May
2 Switzerland	7
7 Denmark	0
24 May
3 Sweden	2
4 United States	6

Final
25 May
2 Switzerland	0
4 United States(OT)	1
Third place
25 May
3 Sweden	6
7 Denmark	2

All times are local (UTC+2).

== Quarterfinals ==
22 May 2025; 16:20	United States	5–2 (1–1, 2–1, 2–0)	Finland	Avicii Arena, Stockholm; Attendance: 9,642

Game reference

Jeremy Swayman
Goalies
Juuse Saros
Referees:
(Canada) Michael Campbell
(Sweden) Mikael Holm
Linesmen:
(Denmark) Albert Ankerstjerne
(Sweden) Ludvig Lundgren

Garland (Cooley, Werenski) (PP) – 04:50	1–0
	1–1	12:58 – Tolvanen (Lammikko, Teräväinen) (PP)
	1–2	27:46 – Puistola (Teräväinen, Lehtonen) (PP)
Buium (Beniers, Werenski) – 34:53	2–2
Garland (Thompson, Cooley) (PP) – 36:04	3–2
Pinto (Smith, Gauthier) – 45:52	4–2
Keller (Pinto) (EN) – 57:15	5–2

10 min
Penalties
8 min
28
Shots
22

22 May 2025; 16:20	Switzerland	6–0 (3–0, 2–0, 1–0)	Austria	Jyske Bank Boxen, Herning; Attendance: 2,621

Game reference

Leonardo Genoni
Goalies
David Kickert
Referees:
(Sweden) Tobias Björk
(Finland) Riku Brander
Linesmen:
(United States) Nick Briganti
(Slovakia) Oto Durmis

Bertschy (Glauser, Genoni) – 06:38	1–0
Meier (Fiala, Moy) (PP) – 11:03	2–0
Jäger (Niederreiter, Knak) – 14:17	3–0
Fiala (Niederreiter, Kukan) (PP) – 23:32	4–0
Schmid (Glauser, Moy) – 24:36	5–0
Knak (Jäger, Marti) – 51:46	6–0

12 min
Penalties
35 min
40
Shots
13

22 May 2025; 20:20	Sweden	5–2 (3–0, 1–1, 1–1)	Czechia	Avicii Arena, Stockholm; Attendance: 12,530

Game reference

Jacob Markström
Goalies
Karel Vejmelka
Daniel Vladař
Referees:
(United States) Sean MacFarlane
(Germany) André Schrader
Linesmen:
(United States) Jake Davis
(United States) Shane Gustafson

Carlsson (Andersson, Zibanejad) (PP) – 12:40	1–0
Raymond (Sandin) – 16:52	2–0
Raymond (Sandin) – 19:33	3–0
	3–1	23:04 – Červenka (Nečas, Pastrňák) (PP2)
Carlsson (Zibanejad, Johansson) – 34:05	4–1
	4–2	48:33 – M. Špaček (Voženílek, Ticháček)
Forsberg (Pettersson) (EN) – 55:04	5–2

8 min
Penalties
6 min
33
Shots
26

22 May 2025; 20:20	Canada	1–2 (0–0, 0–0, 1–2)	Denmark	Jyske Bank Boxen, Herning; Attendance: 10,500

Game reference

Jordan Binnington
Goalies
Frederik Dichow
Referees:
(Latvia) Andris Ansons
(Sweden) Christoffer Holm
Linesmen:
(Finland) Onni Hautamäki
(Czech Republic) Daniel Hynek

Sanheim (Crosby, Konecny) – 45:17	1–0
	1–1	57:43 – Ehlers (Lauridsen, Russell) (EA)
	1–2	59:11 – Olesen (Jensen, Russell)

6 min
Penalties
10 min
40
Shots
33

== Semifinals ==
24 May 2025; 14:20	Sweden	2–6 (0–2, 0–2, 2–2)	United States	Avicii Arena, Stockholm; Attendance: 12,530

Game reference

Jacob Markström
Samuel Ersson
Goalies
Jeremy Swayman
Referees:
(Canada) Michael Campbell
(Germany) André Schrader
Linesmen:
(Czech Republic) Daniel Hynek
(Canada) Tarrington Wyonzek

	0–1	06:52 – Skjei (Pinto)
	0–2	17:13 – Gauthier (Pinto, Smith)
	0–3	31:07 – Garland (Cooley, Skjei)
	0–4	37:03 – Eyssimont (Beniers, LaCombe)
Nylander (Andersson, Karlsson) – 46:32	1–4
Lindholm (Wennberg) – 47:13	2–4
	2–5	51:09 – LaCombe (Nazar)
	2–6	55:53 – Pinto (EN)

2 min
Penalties
4 min
29
Shots
28

24 May 2025; 18:20	Switzerland	7–0 (3–0, 1–0, 3–0)	Denmark	Avicii Arena, Stockholm; Attendance: 12,530

Game reference

Leonardo Genoni
Goalies
Frederik Dichow
Sebastian Dahm
Referees:
(Sweden) Christoffer Holm
(Czech Republic) Jan Hribik
Linesmen:
(United States) Nick Briganti
(United States) Jake Davis

Niederreiter (Moser, Fiala) – 09:23	1–0
Jäger (Knak, Riat) – 12:47	2–0
Niederreiter (Malgin, Kukan) (PP) – 17:23	3–0
Malgin (Meier) – 37:38	4–0
Schmid (Bertschy, Siegenthaler) – 44:48	5–0
Riat (Bertschy) – 52:02	6–0
Moy (Schmid, Meier) (PP) – 53:26	7–0

10 min
Penalties
10 min
34
Shots
17

== Bronze medal game ==
25 May 2025; 15:20	Sweden	6–2 (0–0, 3–0, 3–2)	Denmark	Avicii Arena, Stockholm; Attendance: 12,530

Game reference

Samuel Ersson
Goalies
Frederik Dichow
Referees:
(Latvia) Andris Ansons
(United States) Sean MacFarlane
Linesmen:
(United States) Jake Davis
(United States) Shane Gustafson

Backlund (Larsson, Lindholm) – 25:16	1–0
Backlund (Heineman, Lindholm) – 29:50	2–0
Johansson (Sandin, Carlsson) – 37:09	3–0
Raymond (SH) – 42:55	4–0
	4–1	43:15 – Olesen (Aagaard, Bruggisser) (PP)
	4–2	46:02 – Ehlers (Olesen, True)
Johansson (Backlund, Zibanejad) (PP) – 48:25	5–2
Zibanejad (Carlsson, Gustafsson) – 55:03	6–2

4 min
Penalties
4 min
37
Shots
18

== Gold medal game ==
25 May 2025; 20:20	Switzerland	0–1 OT (0–0, 0–0, 0–0) (OT: 0–1)	United States	Avicii Arena, Stockholm; Attendance: 12,530

Game reference
Leonardo Genoni	Goalies	Jeremy Swayman	Referees: (Canada) Michael Campbell (Sweden) Mikael Holm; Linesmen: (Denmark) Albert Ankerstjerne (Finland) Onni Hautamäki
0–1 / 62:02 – Thompson (Cooley, Skjei)			Referees: (Canada) Michael Campbell (Sweden) Mikael Holm; Linesmen: (Denmark) Albert Ankerstjerne (Finland) Onni Hautamäki
4 min	Penalties	4 min	Referees: (Canada) Michael Campbell (Sweden) Mikael Holm; Linesmen: (Denmark) Albert Ankerstjerne (Finland) Onni Hautamäki
25	Shots	40	Referees: (Canada) Michael Campbell (Sweden) Mikael Holm; Linesmen: (Denmark) Albert Ankerstjerne (Finland) Onni Hautamäki
