= 2025 IIHF World Championship final =

Ice hockey game

	1	2	3	OT	Total
Switzerland	0	0	0	0	0
United States	0	0	0	1	1
- Date: 25 May 2025
- Arena: Avicii Arena
- City: Stockholm
- Attendance: 12,530

The 2025 IIHF World Championship final was played at the Avicii Arena in Stockholm, Sweden on 25 May 2025 to decide the winner of the 2025 IIHF World Championship.

The United States won the title for the third time, beating Switzerland 1–0 in overtime, ending the Americans' 92-year gold medal drought after winning the standalone World Championship for the first time since 1933. Switzerland lost its second consecutive final, having never won gold before.

== Road to the final ==
Switzerland
Round
United States
Opponent
Result
Preliminary round
Opponent
Result
Czechia
4–5 (OT)
Game 1
Denmark
5–0
Denmark
5–2
Game 2
Hungary
6–0
United States
3–0
Game 3
Switzerland
0–3
Germany
5–1
Game 4
Norway
6–5 (OT)
Norway
3–0
Game 5
Germany
6–3
Hungary
10–0
Game 6
Kazakhstan
6–1
Kazakhstan
4–1
Game 7
Czechia
5–2

Pos	Team	Pld	Pts
1	Switzerland	7	19
2	United States	7	17
3	Czechia	7	17
4	Denmark (H)	7	11
5	Germany	7	10
6	Norway	7	4
7	Hungary	7	3
8	Kazakhstan	7	3

Source: IIHF
(H) Host
Preliminary

Pos	Team	Pld	Pts
1	Switzerland	7	19
2	United States	7	17
3	Czechia	7	17
4	Denmark (H)	7	11
5	Germany	7	10
6	Norway	7	4
7	Hungary	7	3
8	Kazakhstan	7	3

Source: IIHF
(H) Host
Opponent
Result
Playoff
Opponent
Result
Austria
6–0
Quarterfinals
Finland
5–2
Denmark
7–0
Semifinals
Sweden
6–2

== Match ==
25 May 2025; 20:20	Switzerland	0–1 OT (0–0, 0–0, 0–0) (OT: 0–1)	United States	Avicii Arena, Stockholm; Attendance: 12,530

Game reference
Leonardo Genoni	Goalies	Jeremy Swayman	Referees: (Canada) Michael Campbell (Sweden) Mikael Holm; Linesmen: (Denmark) Albert Ankerstjerne (Finland) Onni Hautamäki
0–1 / 62:02 – Thompson (Cooley, Skjei)			Referees: (Canada) Michael Campbell (Sweden) Mikael Holm; Linesmen: (Denmark) Albert Ankerstjerne (Finland) Onni Hautamäki
4 min	Penalties	4 min	Referees: (Canada) Michael Campbell (Sweden) Mikael Holm; Linesmen: (Denmark) Albert Ankerstjerne (Finland) Onni Hautamäki
25	Shots	40	Referees: (Canada) Michael Campbell (Sweden) Mikael Holm; Linesmen: (Denmark) Albert Ankerstjerne (Finland) Onni Hautamäki
