= Korbinian Geibel =

German ice hockey player (born 2002)

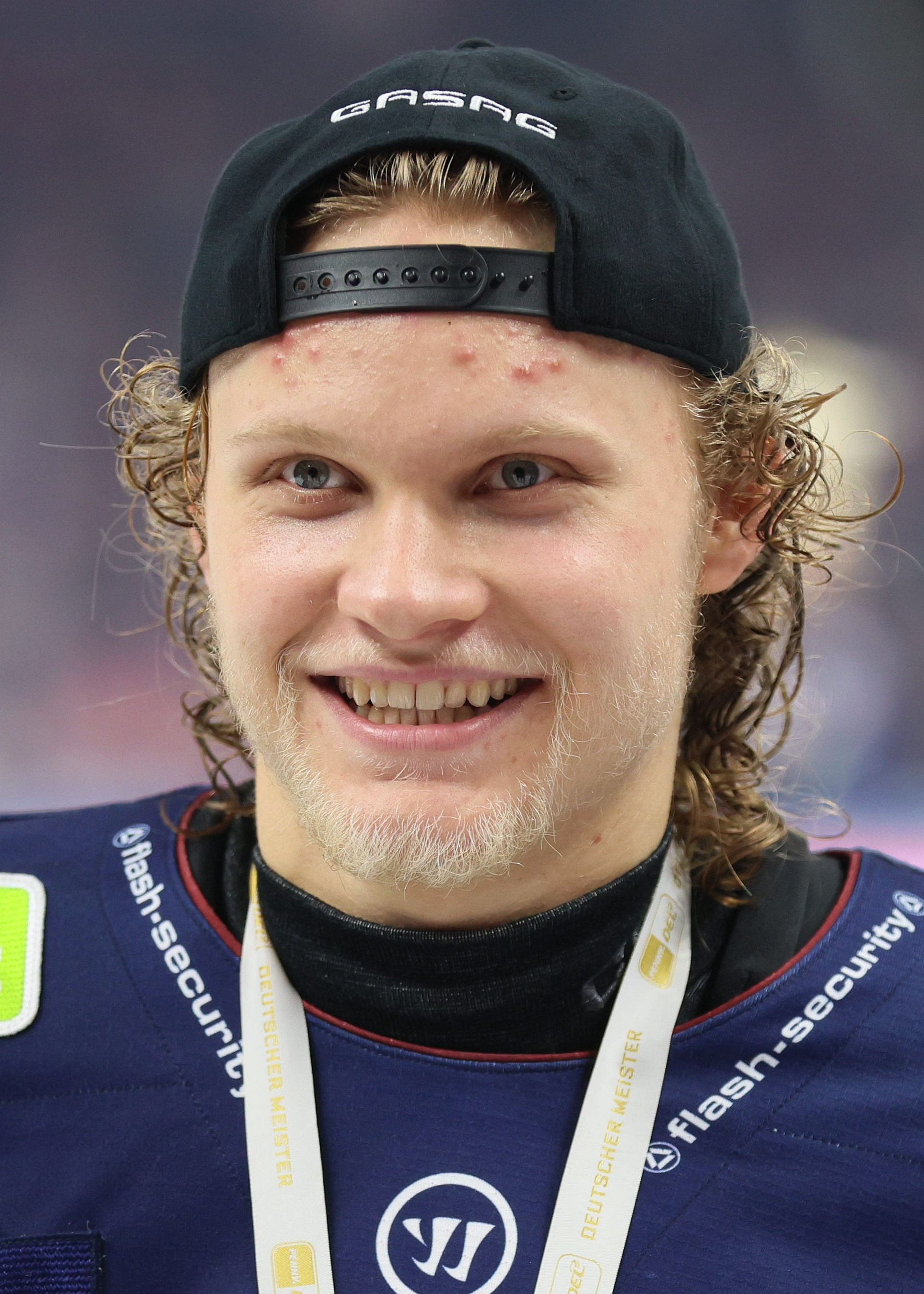
- Geibel in 2025
- Born: 8 July 2002 (age 23) Starnberg, Germany
- Height: 1.83 m (6 ft 0 in)
- Weight: 91 kg (201 lb; 14 st 5 lb)
- Position: Defence
- Shoots: Left
- DEL team Former teams: Eisbären Berlin; Lausitzer Füchse
- National team: Germany
- Playing career: 2020–present

Korbinian Geibel (born 8 July 2002) is a German professional ice hockey player who is a defenceman for Eisbären Berlin of the Deutsche Eishockey Liga (DEL).

== International play ==
Geibel represented the Germany national team at the 2026 Winter Olympics, and the 2025 IIHF World Championship.
