= Michael Fora =

Swiss ice hockey player (born 1995)

- Born: 30 October 1995 (age 30) Giubiasco, Switzerland
- Height: 6 ft 4 in (193 cm)
- Weight: 216 lb (98 kg; 15 st 6 lb)
- Position: Defence
- Shoots: Right
- NL team Former teams: HC Davos; HC Ambrì-Piotta; Charlotte Checkers
- National team: Switzerland
- NHL draft: Undrafted
- Playing career: 2015–present

Michael Fora (born 30 October 1995) is a Swiss professional ice hockey player who is a defenceman for HC Davos of the National League (NL).

== Playing career ==
Fora made his NL debut with HC Ambri-Piotta in the 2015–16 season, appearing in 32 games and putting up 6 points (3 goals).

Fora served as captain of the team for the 2017–18 season. On 23 December 2017, Fora agreed to an early three-year contract extension with HC Ambri-Piotta through the 2020–21 season. The contract contained an NHL-out clause.

Undrafted, on 15 June 2018, Fora signed a two-year entry-level contract with the Carolina Hurricanes of the National Hockey League (NHL). He participated in the Hurricanes training camp and played preseason games with the Hurricanes before being assigned to the Charlotte Checkers of the American Hockey League (AHL) to start the 2018–19 season. Fora played one game in the AHL before asking to part ways with the organization in order to return to HC Ambri-Piotta.

On 3 December 2021, while in his eighth season with Ambri-Piotta 2021–22, Fora agreed to a four-year contract starting in 2022–23 with HC Davos.

== International play ==
Medal record

Representing Switzerland

Ice hockey

World Championships
Silver medal – second place	2018 Denmark	
Silver medal – second place	2024 Czechia	
Silver medal – second place	2025 Sweden/Denmark	

Fora was named to Switzerland men's national team for the 2018 and the 2019 IIHF World Championship.

He represented Switzerland at the 2024 IIHF World Championship and won a silver medal.

== Career statistics ==
=== Regular season and playoffs ===
			Regular season					Playoffs
Season	Team	League	GP	G	A	Pts	PIM	GP	G	A	Pts	PIM
2010–11	HC Ambrì–Piotta	SUI U17	32	10	6	16	36	3	1	0	1	8
2011–12	HC Ambrì–Piotta	SUI U17	1	0	0	0	2	—	—	—	—	—
2012–13	HC Ambrì–Piotta	SUI U17	1	1	0	1	2	—	—	—	—	—
2012–13	HC Ambrì–Piotta	SUI U20	38	3	8	11	52	—	—	—	—	—
2013–14	HC Ambrì–Piotta	SUI U20	38	5	4	9	66	3	0	0	0	6
2013–14	GDT Bellinzona	SUI.3	7	0	1	1	22	—	—	—	—	—
2014–15	Kamloops Blazers	WHL	60	6	26	32	68	—	—	—	—	—
2015–16	HC Ambrì–Piotta	NLA	32	3	3	6	33	—	—	—	—	—
2016–17	HC Ambrì–Piotta	NLA	50	1	8	9	56	—	—	—	—	—
2017–18	HC Ambrì–Piotta	NL	50	6	21	27	26	—	—	—	—	—
2018–19	Charlotte Checkers	AHL	1	0	0	0	0	—	—	—	—	—
2018–19	HC Ambrì–Piotta	NL	30	4	10	14	32	5	1	1	2	0
2019–20	HC Ambrì–Piotta	NL	44	5	15	20	26	—	—	—	—	—
2020–21	HC Ambrì–Piotta	NL	45	7	14	21	95	—	—	—	—	—
2021–22	HC Ambrì–Piotta	NL	39	5	13	18	24	3	0	0	0	4
2022–23	HC Davos	NL	41	3	10	13	18	5	1	1	2	4
2023–24	HC Davos	NL	32	1	10	11	49	7	0	2	2	8
2024–25	HC Davos	NL	43	6	9	15	82	10	0	5	5	8
NL totals			406	41	113	154	441	30	2	9	11	24

=== International ===
Year	Team	Event	Result	GP	G	A	Pts	PIM
2015	Switzerland	WJC	9th	6	0	2	2	2
2018	Switzerland	WC	2nd place, silver medalist(s)	10	0	1	1	4
2019	Switzerland	WC	8th	8	0	0	0	6
2022	Switzerland	OG	8th	4	0	0	0	2
2022	Switzerland	WC	5th	8	1	0	1	33
2023	Switzerland	WC	5th	8	0	2	2	4
2024	Switzerland	WC	2nd place, silver medalist(s)	8	0	1	1	2
2025	Switzerland	WC	2nd place, silver medalist(s)	10	0	5	5	2
2026	Switzerland	OG	5th	5	0	1	1	6
Junior totals				6	0	2	2	2
Senior totals				61	1	10	11	59
