= Jakub Krejčík =

Czech ice hockey player (born 1991)

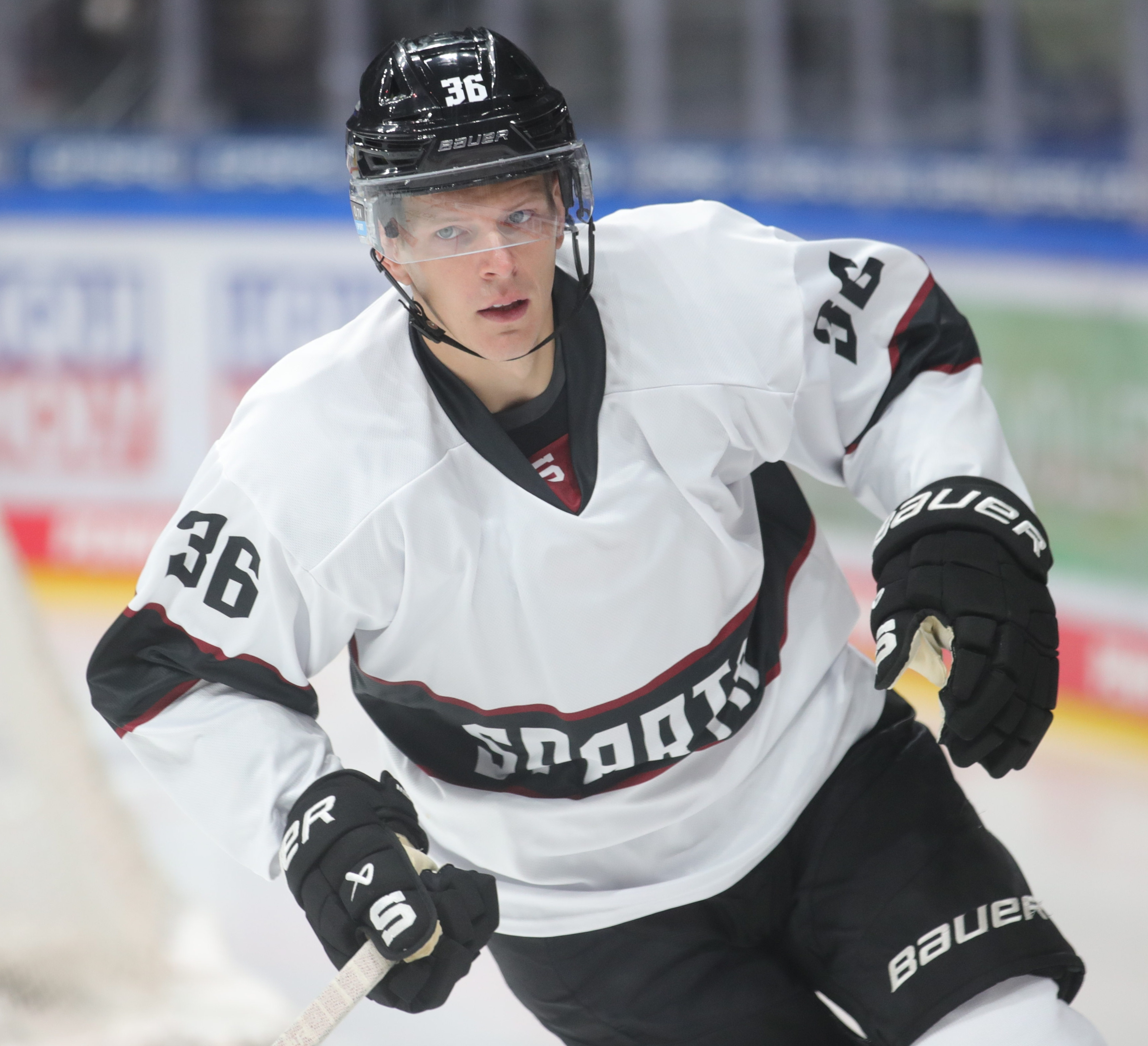
- Jakub Krejčík in 2023
- Born: June 25, 1991 (age 35) Prague, Czechoslovakia
- Height: 6 ft 2 in (188 cm)
- Weight: 198 lb (90 kg; 14 st 2 lb)
- Position: Defence
- Shoots: Left
- ELH team Former teams: HC Sparta Praha; HC Slavia Praha; HC Lev Praha; Örebro HK; KHL Medveščak Zagreb; HC Kometa Brno; Lukko; Oulun Kärpät; Jokerit; Dinamo Minsk
- National team: Czech Republic
- Playing career: 2010–present

Jakub Krejčík (born June 25, 1991) is a Czech professional ice hockey defenceman who is currently playing with HC Sparta Praha of the Czech Extraliga (ELH).

== Playing career ==
Krejčík first played with HC Slavia Praha in the Czech Extraliga during the 2010–11 season, and later moved to the Swedish Hockey League with Örebro HK.

On 8 May 2020, Krejčík was signed to a two-year contract to join Finnish KHL club, Jokerit, starting from the 2020–21 season.

On 14 July 2021, Krejčík and Jokerit mutually agreed to a contract termination. He was later signed to continue in the KHL with HC Dinamo Minsk on a one-year contract on 20 August 2021.

== International play ==
Medal record

Representing Czech Republic

Ice hockey

World Championships
Gold medal – first place	2024 Czechia	
Bronze medal – third place	2012 Finland	

Krejčík represented Czechia at the 2024 IIHF World Championship and won a gold medal.

== Career statistics ==
=== International ===
Year	Team	Event	Result	GP	G	A	Pts	PIM
2012	Czech Republic	WC	3rd place, bronze medalist(s)	6	0	0	0	0
2015	Czech Republic	WC	4th	10	0	3	3	0
2017	Czech Republic	WC	7th	7	0	1	1	2
2018	Czech Republic	WC	7th	4	0	3	3	2
2024	Czechia	WC	1st place, gold medalist(s)	10	1	3	4	6
2025	Czechia	WC	6th	8	0	6	6	14
Senior totals				37	1	16	17	24
