= Cutter Gauthier =

American ice hockey player (born 2004)

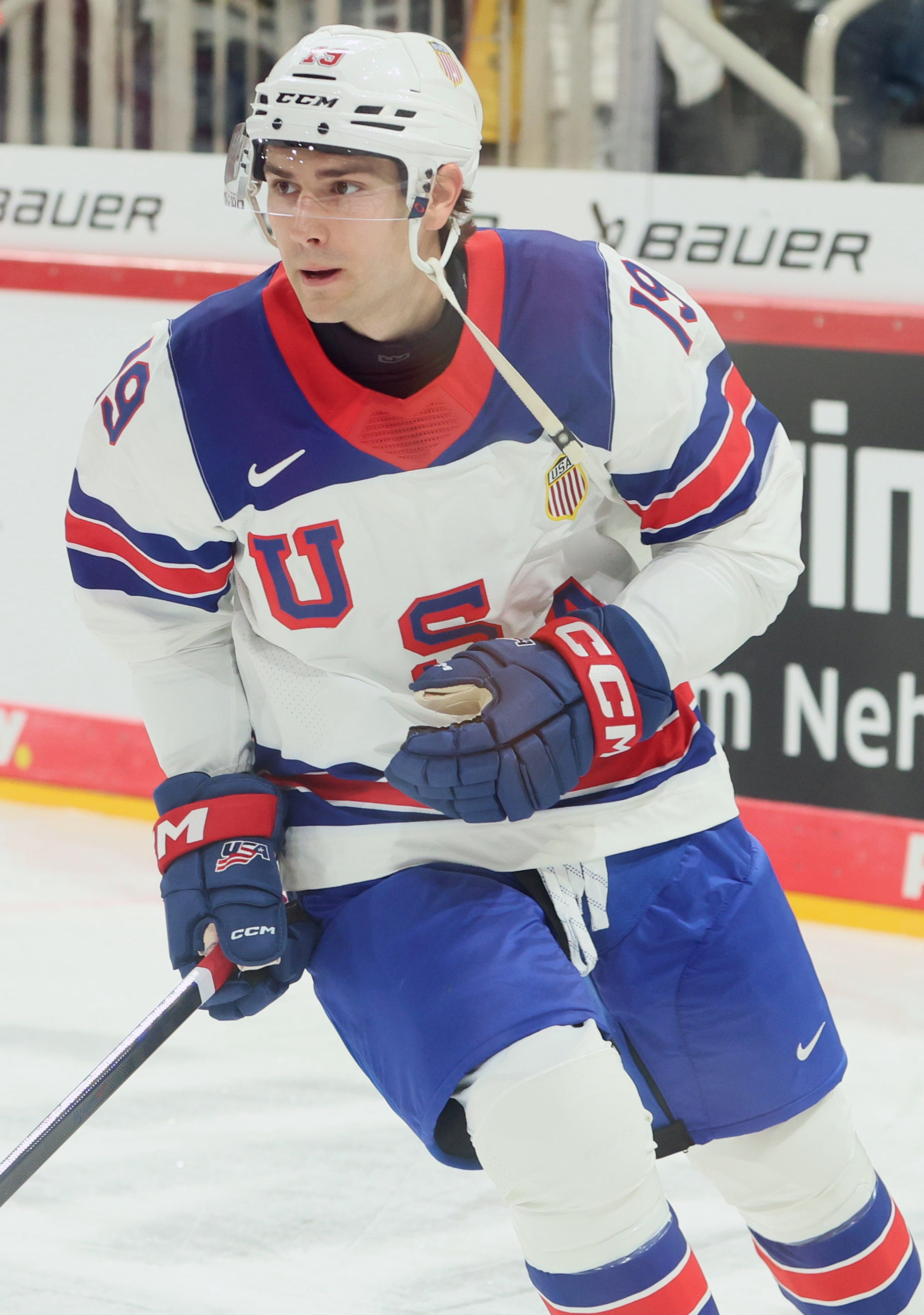
- Gauthier with the United States in 2025
- Born: January 19, 2004 (age 22) Skellefteå, Sweden
- Height: 6 ft 2 in (188 cm)
- Weight: 205 lb (93 kg; 14 st 9 lb)
- Position: Winger
- Shoots: Left
- NHL team: Anaheim Ducks
- National team: United States
- NHL draft: 5th overall, 2022; Philadelphia Flyers
- Playing career: 2023–present

William Cutter Gauthier (/ɡoʊˈtʃiːeɪ/ GOH-chee-ay) (born January 19, 2004) is an American professional ice hockey player who is a winger for the Anaheim Ducks of the National Hockey League (NHL). He was drafted fifth overall by the Philadelphia Flyers in the 2022 NHL entry draft. Gauthier then played two seasons of college ice hockey at Boston College before being traded by request from the Flyers. He made his NHL debut with the Ducks on April 18, 2024.

== Playing career ==
Gauthier competed at the 2022 BioSteel All-American Game.

In his freshman season at Boston College, he was the Eagles' leading point and goal scorer, with 16 goals and 21 assists for 37 points in 32 games. Gauthier earned All-Rookie team and Third-Team All-Star honors in Hockey East.

On January 8, 2024, Gauthier's NHL rights were traded to the Anaheim Ducks for Jamie Drysdale and a 2025 second-round draft pick. Shortly after the trade announcement, it was reported that Gauthier had refused to sign with the Flyers, and Gauthier had quipped in an interview the previous month that being drafted by the Flyers was not going to "roll over well," because his favorite team as a child was the rival Pittsburgh Penguins. Later that evening, in response to questions from the press on the matter, Flyers management confirmed that Gauthier had informed the team in May 2023 that he did not intend on signing with the Flyers. Gauthier received death threats after the trade amid speculation that his decision was related to Flyers head coach John Tortorella or former Flyer Kevin Hayes, but he denied those rumors and stated that it was a "private matter." Aside from much speculation, the specific reasons for Gauthier opting not to sign with the Flyers are largely not publicly known.

At the conclusion of his sophomore season, having led the NCAA with 38 goals and tying the Eagles' record for most goals in a single season in program history, Gauthier ended his collegiate career, signing a three-year, entry-level contract with the Anaheim Ducks on April 14, 2024. Gauthier recorded his first NHL goal on November 15, 2024, beating Alex Lyon of the Detroit Red Wings, boosting his team in a 6–4 victory. In his first full season in the NHL, Gauthier had 20 goals and 24 assists in 82 games. He was named to the league's All-Rookie Team.

Gauthier scored his first career hat trick on November 4, 2025, in a 7–3 victory over the Florida Panthers. He became the fourth player in Ducks history, joining Teemu Selänne, Paul Kariya, and Corey Perry, to score 40 goals in a season when he scored off a one-timer on the power play during the third period of an April 12, 2026 game against the Vancouver Canucks.

On September 15, 2026, Gauthier was re-signed to an $81 million, six-year contract, worth $13.5 million annually, by the Ducks.

In November 2026, Gauthier scored a hat trick on four separate occasions, becoming the first player in NHL history to record four hat tricks in a single month.

== International play ==
Medal record

Men's ice hockey

Representing the United States

World Championships
Gold medal – first place	2025 Sweden/Denmark	

World Junior Championships
Gold medal – first place	2024 Sweden	
Bronze medal – third place	2023 Canada	

World U18 Championships
Silver medal – second place	2022 Germany	

Gauthier represented the United States at the 2020 Winter Youth Olympics and earned a silver medal. He was then selected to represent the United States at the 2022 World U18 Championships, where he recorded three goals and six assists in six games and earned a silver medal.

On December 12, 2022, Gauthier was named to the United States junior team to compete at the 2023 World Junior Championships.

On December 16, 2023, he was again named to junior team's roster to compete at the 2024 World Junior Championships and was named alternate captain of the gold medal-winning team. He led the team in scoring, recording two goals and ten assists in seven games, tying Czech player Jiří Kulich for top scorer in the tournament. He was named the best forward in the directorate awards.

Gauthier represented the United States senior team at the 2025 World Championship, where he recorded five goals and four assists in ten games and helped the team win its first gold medal since 1933.

== Personal life ==
Cutter was born in Sweden while his father, Sean Gauthier, was playing for Skellefteå AIK. His father is Canadian, while his mother is American. He has two younger sisters. The family moved to Scottsdale, Arizona and later relocated to Detroit, Michigan. Growing up, Cutter’s favorite team was the Pittsburgh Penguins, and his favorite player was Penguins' captain Sidney Crosby.

== Career statistics ==
=== Regular season and playoffs ===
			Regular season					Playoffs
Season	Team	League	GP	G	A	Pts	PIM	GP	G	A	Pts	PIM
2020–21	U.S. National Development Team	USHL	45	20	17	37	33	—	—	—	—	—
2021–22	U.S. National Development Team	USHL	54	34	31	65	49	—	—	—	—	—
2022–23	Boston College	HE	32	16	21	37	37	—	—	—	—	—
2023–24	Boston College	HE	41	38	27	65	18	—	—	—	—	—
2023–24	Anaheim Ducks	NHL	1	0	1	1	0	—	—	—	—	—
2024–25	Anaheim Ducks	NHL	82	20	24	44	20	—	—	—	—	—
2025–26	Anaheim Ducks	NHL	76	41	28	69	28	12	4	8	12	4
NHL totals			159	61	53	114	48	12	4	8	12	4

=== International ===
Year	Team	Event	Result	GP	G	A	Pts	PIM
2022	United States	U18	2nd place, silver medalist(s)	6	3	6	9	6
2023	United States	WJC	3rd place, bronze medalist(s)	7	4	6	10	2
2023	United States	WC	4th	10	7	2	9	2
2024	United States	WJC	1st place, gold medalist(s)	7	2	10	12	4
2025	United States	WC	1st place, gold medalist(s)	10	5	4	9	2
Junior totals				20	9	22	31	12
Senior totals				20	12	6	18	4

== Awards and honors ==
Award	Year	Ref
College
Hockey East All-Rookie Team	2023	
All-Hockey East Third Team	2023	
All-Hockey East First Team	2024	
AHCA East First Team All-American	2024	
NHL
All-Rookie Team	2025	
International
WJC Best Forward	2024	
WJC Media All-Star Team	2024	

Awards and achievements
Preceded by Tyson Foerster	Philadelphia Flyers first-round draft pick 2022	Succeeded by Matvei Michkov
