= Frederik Dichow =

Danish ice hockey player (born 2001)

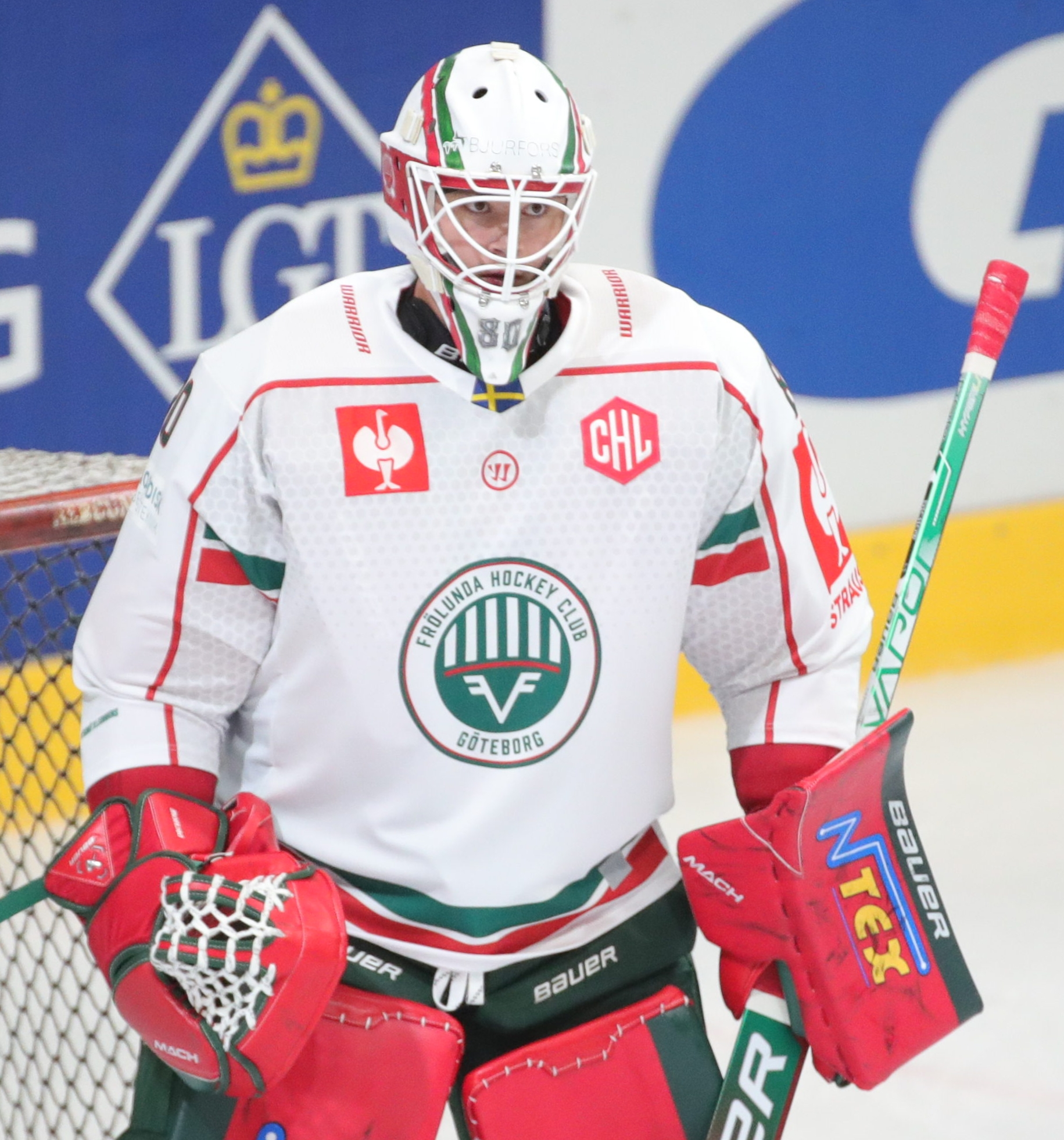
- Dichow in September 2022.
- Born: 1 March 2001 (age 25) Vojens, Denmark
- Height: 6 ft 5 in (196 cm)
- Weight: 192 lb (87 kg; 13 st 10 lb)
- Position: Goaltender
- Catches: Right
- SHL team Former teams: HV71; Rungsted Seier Capital; Odense Bulldogs; Rögle BK; Frölunda HC
- National team: Denmark
- NHL draft: 138th overall, 2019; Montreal Canadiens
- Playing career: 2019–present

Frederik Emanuel Dichow Nissen (born 1 March 2001) is a Danish professional ice hockey player who is a goaltender for HV71 of the Swedish Hockey League (SHL).

== Early life ==
He was born on 1 March 2001. He is from Vojens, Denmark.

== Playing career ==
He was selected by the Montreal Canadiens in the fifth round, 138th overall, of the 2019 NHL entry draft.

He moved to Sweden to play with Kristianstads IK for the 2022 season. After a stint with Frölunda HC, he signed with HV71.

== International play ==
Dichow represented the Denmark national team at the 2022 Winter Olympics and the 2022, 2023, 2024, and 2025 IIHF World Championship.

He was cited as a critical factor in Denmark reaching the semi-finals for the first time in 2025. He stopped 39 Canadian shots, and was described as a "wall in the Danish goal."
