= Ken Jäger =

Swiss ice hockey player

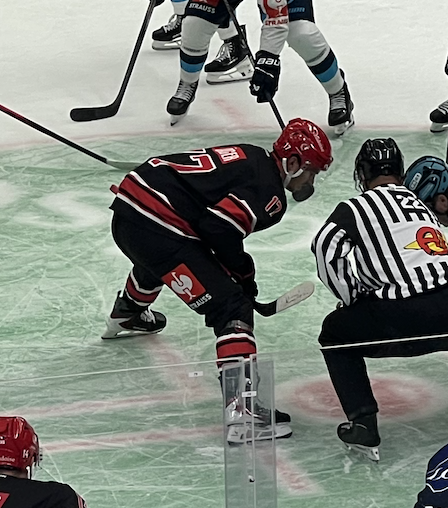
- Born: 30 May 1998 (age 28) Davos, Switzerland
- Height: 186 cm (6 ft 1 in)
- Weight: 83 kg (183 lb; 13 st 1 lb)
- Position: Forward
- Shoots: Right
- NL team Former teams: Lausanne HC; HC Davos; EHC Visp; Rögle BK; Västerviks IK
- National team: Switzerland
- Playing career: 2016–present

Ken Jäger (born 30 May 1998) is a Swiss professional ice hockey player who is a forward for Lausanne HC of the National League (NL).

== Playing career ==
Jäger made National League debut during the 2016–17 season with HC Davos.

In 2018, Jäger shortly joined Rögle BK in the Swedish Hockey League(SHL) before joining Västerviks IK in the HockeyAllsvenskan.

For the 2020–21 season, Jäger returned to Switzerland and the NL, joining Lausanne HC. In September 2022, he signed a contract extension with the LHC lasting until the end of the 2025–26 season.

In August 2025, Jäger signed a seven-year contract with HC Davos, returning to the team starting with the 2026–27 season until 2033.

== International play ==
Medal record

Representing Switzerland

Ice hockey

World Championships
Silver medal – second place	2024 Czechia	
Silver medal – second place	2025 Sweden/Denmark	
Silver medal – second place	2026 Switzerland	

Jäger was named to Switzerland's under-20 team for the 2018 World Junior Ice Hockey Championships. He played 5 games with the team, scoring 2 goals.

He made his IIHF World Championship debut at the 2024 IIHF World Championship and recorded one goal and one assist in six games and won a silver medal. He again represented Switzerland at the 2025 IIHF World Championship and recorded two goals and three assists in ten games and won a silver medal.

Jäger represented the Switzerland national team at the 2026 Winter Olympics.

== Career statistics ==
=== Regular season and playoffs ===
			Regular season					Playoffs
Season	Team	League	GP	G	A	Pts	PIM	GP	G	A	Pts	PIM
2013–14	HC Davos U17	Novizen Elite	5	0	1	1	0	2	0	0	0	0
2014–15	HC Davos U17	Novizen Elite	30	15	15	30	2	6	2	4	6	2
2015–16	HC Davos U20	Elite Jr. A	34	4	9	13	12	8	0	2	2	0
2016–17	HC Davos U20	Elite Jr. A	42	14	17	31	26	8	2	2	4	0
2016–17	HC Davos	NLA	2	0	0	0	0	—	—	—	—	—
2017–18	HC Davos U20	Elite Jr. A	18	12	6	18	28	3	1	0	1	2
2017–18	HC Davos	NL	0	0	0	0	0	3	0	0	0	0
2017–18	EHC Visp	SL	8	1	1	2	0	—	—	—	—	—
2018–19	Rögle BK	SHL	4	0	0	0	0	—	—	—	—	—
2018–19	Västerviks IK	Allsvenskan	37	5	2	7	14	5	2	0	2	0
2019–20	Västerviks IK	Allsvenskan	49	10	9	19	12	1	1	0	1	0
2020–21	Lausanne HC	NL	36	1	5	6	10	6	0	0	0	0
2021–22	Lausanne HC	NL	51	8	8	16	14	8	2	1	3	0
2022–23	Lausanne HC	NL	43	6	5	11	18	—	—	—	—	—
2023–24	Lausanne HC	NL	51	12	15	27	14	19	1	7	8	6
2024–25	Lausanne HC	NL	51	14	13	27	12	19	3	1	4	12
2025–26	Lausanne HC	NL	40	5	4	9	39	7	2	1	3	2
NL (NLA) totals			274	46	50	96	107	62	8	10	18	20

=== International ===
Year	Team	Event	GP	G	A	Pts	PIM
2018	Switzerland U20	WJC-20	5	2	0	2	2
2024	Switzerland	WC	6	1	1	2	0
2025	Switzerland	WC	10	2	3	5	4
2026	Switzerland	OG	5	0	2	2	0
2026	Switzerland	WC	10	4	3	7	4
Junior totals			5	2	0	2	2
Senior totals			31	7	9	16	8
