= Simon Knak =

Swiss ice hockey player (born 2002)

- Born: 27 January 2002 (age 24) Zürich, Switzerland
- Height: 6 ft 1 in (185 cm)
- Weight: 185 lb (84 kg; 13 st 3 lb)
- Position: Winger
- Shoots: Left
- NL team: HC Davos
- National team: Switzerland
- NHL draft: 179th overall, 2021; Nashville Predators
- Playing career: 2019–present

Simon Knak (born 27 January 2002) is a Swiss professional ice hockey player who is a winger for HC Davos of the National League (NL). He was selected by the Nashville Predators in the sixth round, 179th overall, of the 2021 NHL entry draft.

== Playing career ==
Knak began his professional career in the 2018–19 season, playing three games for EHC Kloten in the Swiss League (SL), where he recorded one assist. On 1 July 2019, he departed from Kloten's U20 squad to join the Portland Winterhawks of the Western Hockey League (WHL) for the 2019–20 campaign.

Knak began the 2020–21 season with HC Davos in the National League (NL) due to the delayed start of the WHL season. On 25 February 2021, it was confirmed that he would head back to Portland for the beginning of their season, following his final game with HC Davos against HC Fribourg-Gottéron on 26 February 2021.

On 2 August 2021, Knak took a significant step in his hockey career by signing his first professional contract. The deal was a two-year agreement with HC Davos, one of the most prominent clubs in Switzerland's National League (NL). This contract secured his place on the team's roster through the end of the 2022–23 season.

== International play ==
Medal record

Representing Switzerland

Ice hockey

World Championships
Silver medal – second place	2025 Sweden/Denmark	
Silver medal – second place	2026 Switzerland	

Knak was selected to represent Switzerland's U20 national team at the 2020 World Junior Championships held in the Czech Republic. He earned another selection for the 2021 tournament in Edmonton, Canada, where he served as team captain. During the competition, he scored one goal in four games, as Switzerland missed the quarterfinals for the first time in five years.

== Career statistics ==
=== Regular season and playoffs ===
			Regular season					Playoffs
Season	Team	League	GP	G	A	Pts	PIM	GP	G	A	Pts	PIM
2017–18	EHC Kloten	Elite Jr. A	17	1	1	2	8	2	0	1	1	0
2018–19	EHC Kloten	Elite Jr. A	37	14	11	25	8	6	4	4	8	6
2018–19	EHC Kloten	SL	3	0	1	1	0	—	—	—	—	—
2019–20	Portland Winterhawks	WHL	49	9	25	34	6	—	—	—	—	—
2020–21	HC Davos	NL	25	3	5	8	6	—	—	—	—	—
2020–21	Portland Winterhawks	WHL	24	16	13	29	6	—	—	—	—	—
2021–22	HC Davos	NL	42	6	5	11	10	9	2	2	4	0
2022–23	HC Davos	NL	50	8	15	23	24	5	0	0	0	2
2022–23	Milwaukee Admirals	AHL	2	0	0	0	0	—	—	—	—	—
2023–24	HC Davos	NL	32	5	7	12	8	—	—	—	—	—
2024–25	HC Davos	NL	44	8	5	13	8	10	1	5	6	6
2025–26	HC Davos	NL	47	7	10	17	37	17	4	2	6	4
NL totals			240	37	47	84	93	41	7	9	16	12

=== International ===
Year	Team	Event	Result	GP	G	A	Pts	PIM
2018	Switzerland	HG18	8th	4	2	0	2	0
2019	Switzerland	U18	9th	7	1	3	4	6
2019	Switzerland	HG18	8th	4	0	1	1	0
2020	Switzerland	WJC	5th	5	2	0	2	0
2021	Switzerland	WJC	9th	4	1	0	1	0
2022	Switzerland	WJC	8th	5	2	0	2	6
2025	Switzerland	WC	2nd place, silver medalist(s)	10	1	5	6	2
2026	Switzerland	OG	5th	3	0	0	0	2
2026	Switzerland	WC	2nd place, silver medalist(s)	10	2	3	5	0
Junior totals				29	8	4	12	12
Senior totals				23	3	8	11	4
