= Christian Marti =

Swiss ice hockey player (born 1993)

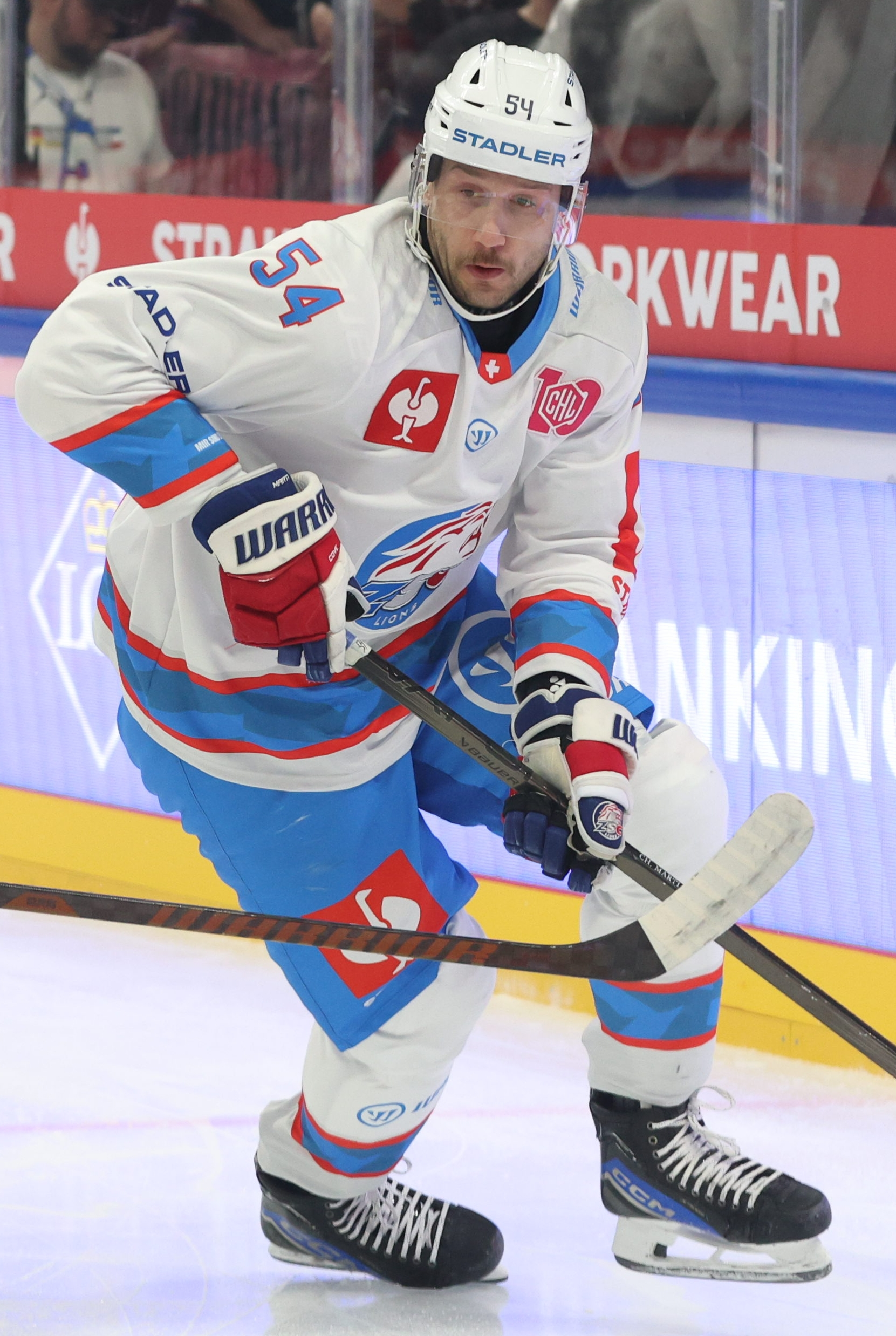
- Marti in 2024 with ZSC Lions
- Born: 29 March 1993 (age 33) Bülach, Switzerland
- Height: 6 ft 3 in (191 cm)
- Weight: 209 lb (95 kg; 14 st 13 lb)
- Position: Defence
- Shoots: Left
- NL team Former teams: ZSC Lions; Kloten Flyers; Genève-Servette HC; Lehigh Valley Phantoms
- National team: Switzerland
- NHL draft: Undrafted
- Playing career: 2011–present

Christian Marti (born 29 March 1993) is a Swiss professional ice hockey player who is a defenceman for the ZSC Lions of the National League (NL).

== Playing career ==
Marti participated in the 2012 World Junior Ice Hockey Championships as a member of the Switzerland men's national junior ice hockey team. After transferring from the Kloten Flyers and playing two National League A seasons with Genève-Servette HC, Marti, as an undrafted free agent, signed to an entry-level contract with the Philadelphia Flyers on 1 May 2015.

In the 2015–16 season, Marti attended the Flyers training camp before he was reassigned to American Hockey League affiliate, the Lehigh Valley Phantoms. In 27 games with the Phantoms, Marti registered 1 assist while also appearing in two games with the Reading Royals of the ECHL.

At the conclusion of his first North American season, Marti opted to leave the Flyers organization and return to his native Switzerland, signing a three-year deal with the ZSC Lions on 14 June 2016.

== International play ==
Medal record

Representing Switzerland

Ice hockey

World Championships
Silver medal – second place	2024 Czechia	
Silver medal – second place	2025 Sweden/Denmark	
Silver medal – second place	2026 Switzerland	

Marti represented Switzerland at the Ice Hockey World Championships and won silver medals in 2024 and 2025.

== Career statistics ==
=== Regular season and playoffs ===
			Regular season					Playoffs
Season	Team	League	GP	G	A	Pts	PIM	GP	G	A	Pts	PIM
2008–09	Kloten Flyers	SUI U17	30	2	6	8	48	10	1	2	3	30
2009–10	Kloten Flyers	SUI U17	28	11	14	25	86	10	2	6	8	26
2009–10	Kloten Flyers	SUI U20	2	0	0	0	0	—	—	—	—	—
2010–11	Kloten Flyers	SUI U20	38	3	6	9	22	11	0	0	0	28
2011–12	Kloten Flyers	SUI U20	12	4	6	10	24	3	1	0	1	0
2011–12	Kloten Flyers	NLA	41	0	2	2	6	5	0	0	0	2
2012–13	Blainville–Boisbriand Armada	QMJHL	46	5	9	14	35	15	1	3	4	6
2013–14	Genève–Servette HC	NLA	50	4	8	12	24	12	1	4	5	8
2014–15	Genève–Servette HC	NLA	32	1	7	8	20	—	—	—	—	—
2015–16	Lehigh Valley Phantoms	AHL	27	0	1	1	10	—	—	—	—	—
2015–16	Reading Royals	ECHL	2	0	0	0	0	—	—	—	—	—
2016–17	ZSC Lions	NLA	48	2	8	10	43	6	1	0	1	8
2017–18	ZSC Lions	NL	28	1	3	4	10	13	0	1	1	8
2018–19	ZSC Lions	NL	48	0	3	3	32	—	—	—	—	—
2019–20	ZSC Lions	NL	50	2	16	18	48	—	—	—	—	—
2020–21	ZSC Lions	NL	51	2	13	15	22	9	1	2	3	0
2021–22	ZSC Lions	NL	51	2	12	14	22	18	1	5	6	16
2022–23	ZSC Lions	NL	38	1	8	9	26	9	0	1	1	0
2023–24	ZSC Lions	NL	50	2	14	16	43	15	1	1	2	8
2024–25	ZSC Lions	NL	46	0	3	3	18	14	1	2	3	33
NL totals			533	17	97	114	314	101	6	16	22	83

=== International ===
Year	Team	Event	Result	GP	G	A	Pts	PIM
2011	Switzerland	U18	7th	6	0	0	0	16
2012	Switzerland	WJC	8th	6	1	0	1	0
2013	Switzerland	WJC	6th	6	1	2	3	4
2016	Switzerland	WC	11th	4	0	0	0	4
2017	Switzerland	WC	6th	8	0	1	1	2
2022	Switzerland	WC	5th	5	0	1	1	2
2023	Switzerland	WC	5th	8	1	1	2	2
2024	Switzerland	WC	2nd place, silver medalist(s)	10	0	0	0	2
2025	Switzerland	WC	2nd place, silver medalist(s)	8	1	6	7	2
2026	Switzerland	OG	5th	5	0	0	0	2
2026	Switzerland	WC	2nd place, silver medalist(s)	10	0	2	2	2
Junior totals				18	2	2	4	20
Senior totals				58	2	11	13	18
