= Tage Thompson =

American ice hockey player (born 1997)

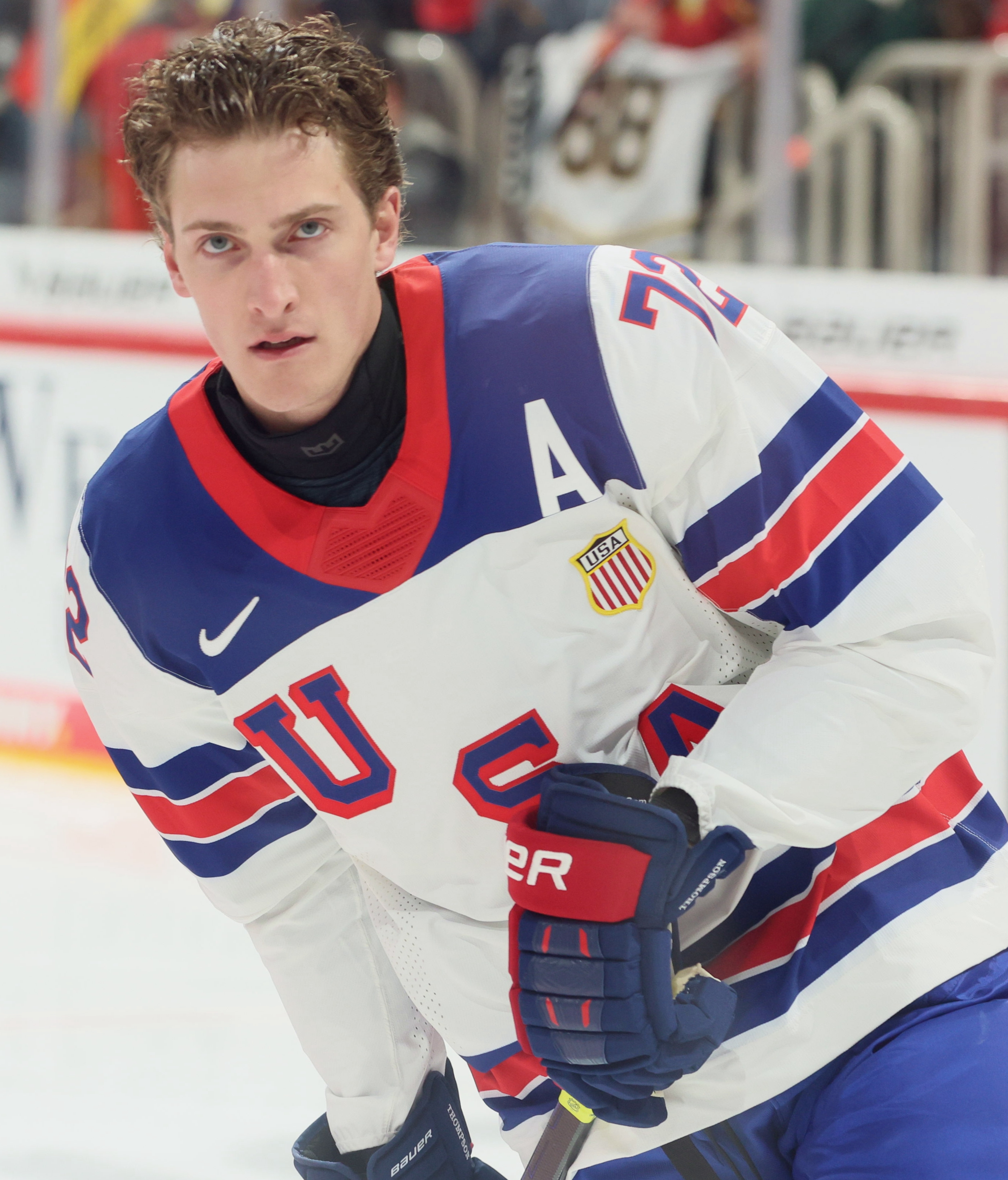
- Thompson with the United States in 2025
- Born: October 30, 1997 (age 28) Phoenix, Arizona, U.S.
- Height: 6 ft 6 in (198 cm)
- Weight: 220 lb (100 kg; 15 st 10 lb)
- Position: Center
- Shoots: Right
- NHL team Former teams: Buffalo Sabres; St. Louis Blues
- National team: United States
- NHL draft: 26th overall, 2016; St. Louis Blues
- Playing career: 2017–present

Tage Nathaniel Thompson (/teɪdʒ/ TAYJ; born October 30, 1997) is an American professional ice hockey player who is a center and alternate captain for the Buffalo Sabres of the National Hockey League (NHL). Nicknamed "TNT" for his initials and booming slapshot, Thompson was selected 26th overall by the St. Louis Blues in the 2016 NHL entry draft, with whom he played one season before being traded to the Sabres. Thompson played his collegiate hockey at the University of Connecticut.

== Early life ==
Thompson's father, Brent Thompson, is a Canadian former NHL player and was a long time ECHL, AHL and NHL assistant coach starting with his first team the AHL Riverman from 2005-2009, in Peoria, Illinois. He last served as an assistant coach for the Anaheim Ducks. At the time Tage was born, Brent was a member of the Phoenix Coyotes organization. His mother, Kimberly Oliver Thompson, is from Phoenix, Arizona. His younger brother, Tyce, is a forward for Barys Astana of the Kontinental Hockey League (KHL) and had a brief NHL stint with the New Jersey Devils.

Thompson was born in Phoenix, Arizona, attending 11 different schools throughout the U.S. before his accelerated graduation from Pioneer High School in Ann Arbor, Michigan, at the request of the University of Connecticut. During his time in Peoria, Illinois, Thompson won the NIHL 2008-2009 Pee Wee Elite title with his Peoria Youth Hockey Association team.

== Playing career ==
After playing in the U.S. National Development Team in the United States Hockey League, Thompson embarked on a collegiate career with Connecticut in the Hockey East conference. Thompson appeared in all 36 games during his freshman season at UConn in 2015–16 and was second on the team with 32 points on 14 goals and 18 assists. He also led the nation with 14 power play goals.

In the 2016–17 season, and after his selection by the Blues in the draft, Thompson appeared in 34 games with the Huskies as a sophomore. He missed two games while participating with Team USA in the IIHF World Junior Championship in Canada which resulted in Thompson earning his second Gold Medal. During his 34 games, Thompson led the Huskies with 19 goals and 32 points. After the completion of the Huskies season, Thompson concluded his collegiate career and signed a three-year, entry-level contract with the St. Louis Blues on March 7, 2017. He immediately joined the Blues affiliate, the Chicago Wolves of the AHL, on an amateur tryout contract for the remainder of the 2016–17 season.

Thompson made his NHL debut in the Blues' first game of the 2017–18 season against the Pittsburgh Penguins on October 4, 2017. He played four NHL games before being sent down to the San Antonio Rampage on October 13. He was recalled to the NHL on December 18, and scored his first NHL goal three days later, in a 3–2 loss against the Edmonton Oilers.

On July 1, 2018, he was part of a trade by the Blues that sent Patrik Berglund, Vladimír Sobotka, a 2019 first-round draft pick, and a 2021 second-round draft pick to the Buffalo Sabres for Ryan O'Reilly.

On October 5, 2020, as a restricted free agent, Thompson signed a three-year, $4.2 million contract extension with the Sabres.

Entering the 2021–22 season with low expectations for the Sabres, Thompson enjoyed a breakout season playing on the top line with Jeff Skinner and new acquisition Alex Tuch. He tallied his first career hat-trick on February 19, 2022, in a 5–3 loss to the Colorado Avalanche. He finished the season with 38 goals and 68 points in 78 games. On August 30, Thompson signed a seven-year, $50 million contract extension with the Sabres.

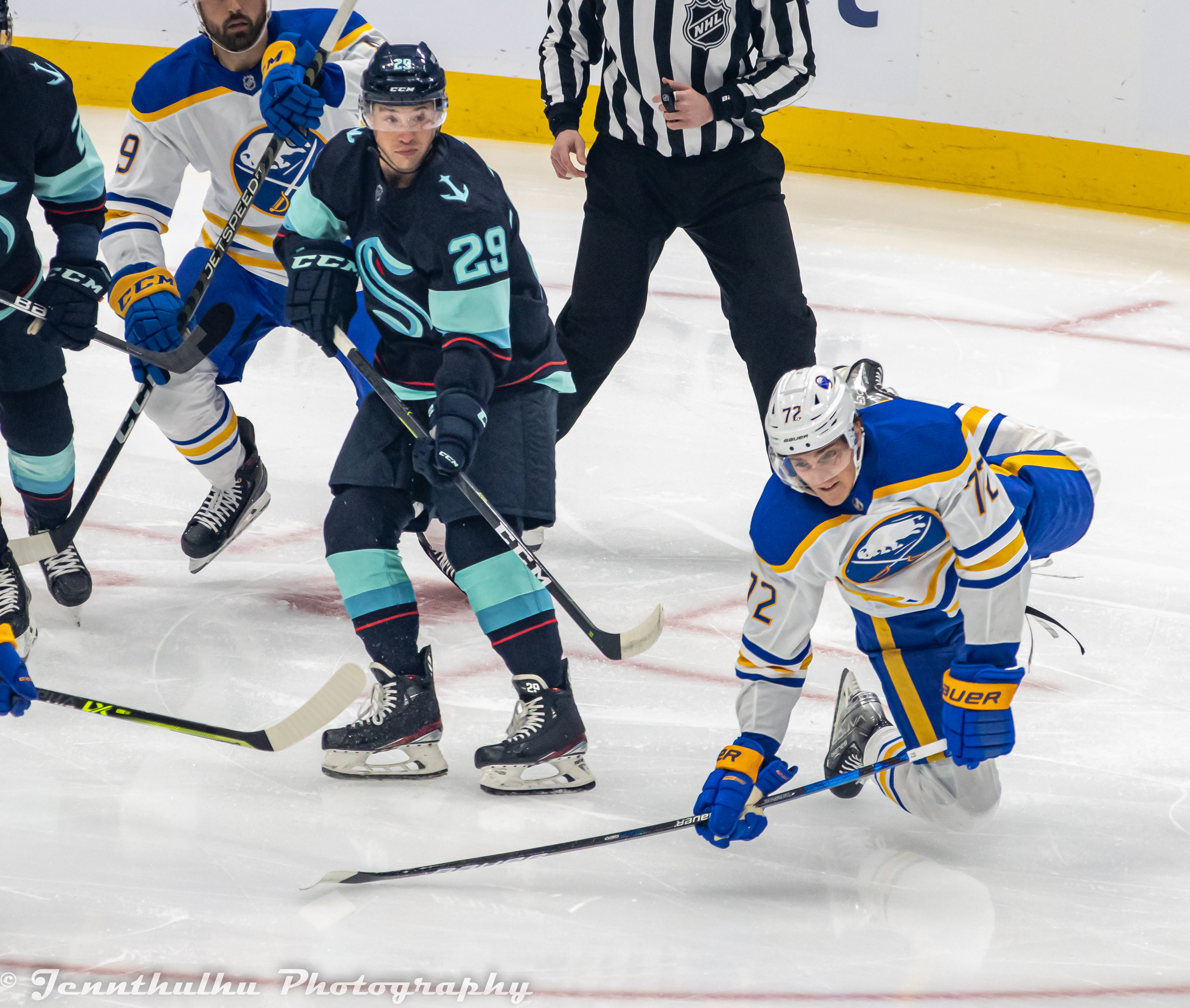
Thompson (right) in a game against the Seattle Kraken in 2022.

On October 31, 2022, Thompson scored a hat-trick and tallied three assists in an 8–3 win over the Detroit Red Wings. He was the sixth player in franchise history to collect six points in a game, and he did so again a little over one month later. On December 7, against the Columbus Blue Jackets, he scored five goals in a game including four in the first period, becoming the fourth player in NHL history to do so. He added an assist for a total of six points. His five goals also tied the Sabres franchise record for goals in a game, joining Dave Andreychuk. He also became only the second American-born player to score five times in a game; the first one, Mark Pavelich, did it 39 years before Thompson.

In January 2023, he was named to the 2023 NHL All Star Game, the first of his career, but would be replaced by defenseman Rasmus Dahlin due to injury. On February 23, Thompson became the first Sabres player to record four hat-tricks in a season since Drew Stafford in 2010–11, doing so in a 6–5 overtime win versus the Tampa Bay Lightning. Three days later, on February 26, he scored in a 7–4 win against the Washington Capitals, becoming a 40-goal scorer for the first time in his career, and the first player to do so for the Sabres since Jeff Skinner in 2018–19. Later in the season, he became the first Sabres player to record 90 points in a season since Daniel Brière did so in 2006–07, picking up an assist in a 2–1 loss to the Florida Panthers. In 2023–24, his output per game dropped by 35% from the previous season, scoring 56 points in 71 games.

Leading up to the 2026 Winter Olympics during the 2025–26 season, Thompson had scored eight goals and seven assists in 12 games, including scoring a hat trick against the Montreal Canadiens. Overall, he scored 59 points with 30 goals and 29 assists in 57 games prior to the Olympic break.

== International play ==
Medal record

Men's ice hockey

Representing the United States

Winter Olympics
Gold medal – first place	2026 Milano Cortina	

World Championships
Gold medal – first place	2025 Sweden/Denmark	
Bronze medal – third place	2018 Denmark	
Bronze medal – third place	2021 Latvia	

World Junior Championships
Gold medal – first place	2017 Canada	

World U18 Championships
Gold medal – first place	2015 Switzerland	

Thompson represented the United States at the 2025 IIHF World Championship, where he recorded six goals and three assists in ten games. During the 2025 IIHF World Championship final he scored the game-winning overtime goal against Switzerland and helped Team USA win their first gold medal since 1933.

On January 2, 2026, he was named to Team USA's roster for the 2026 Winter Olympics at which he won a gold medal with Team USA. He injured his foot in the game against Slovakia, but still played in the final game against Canada two days later. During the preliminary round, Thompson had two goals in three games, and was tied with forwards Brock Nelson and Brady Tkachuk.

Amid online backlash faced by the men's Olympic hockey team regarding the inclusion of FBI director Kash Patel during their gold medal celebrations and members of the team laughing at President Trump's comments of being impeached if he did not invite the women's team to the White House, Thompson was among the majority who visited with the president and attended the State of the Union. Thompson was also photographed wearing a Make America Great Again hat with press secretary Karoline Leavitt, during the team's visit. When questioned about his and the team's reactions, Thompson stated that it was a huge honor to play for the national team and that everyone has their own opinions, while describing the following 72 hours after the game as a lot of fun and a whirlwind.

== Personal life ==
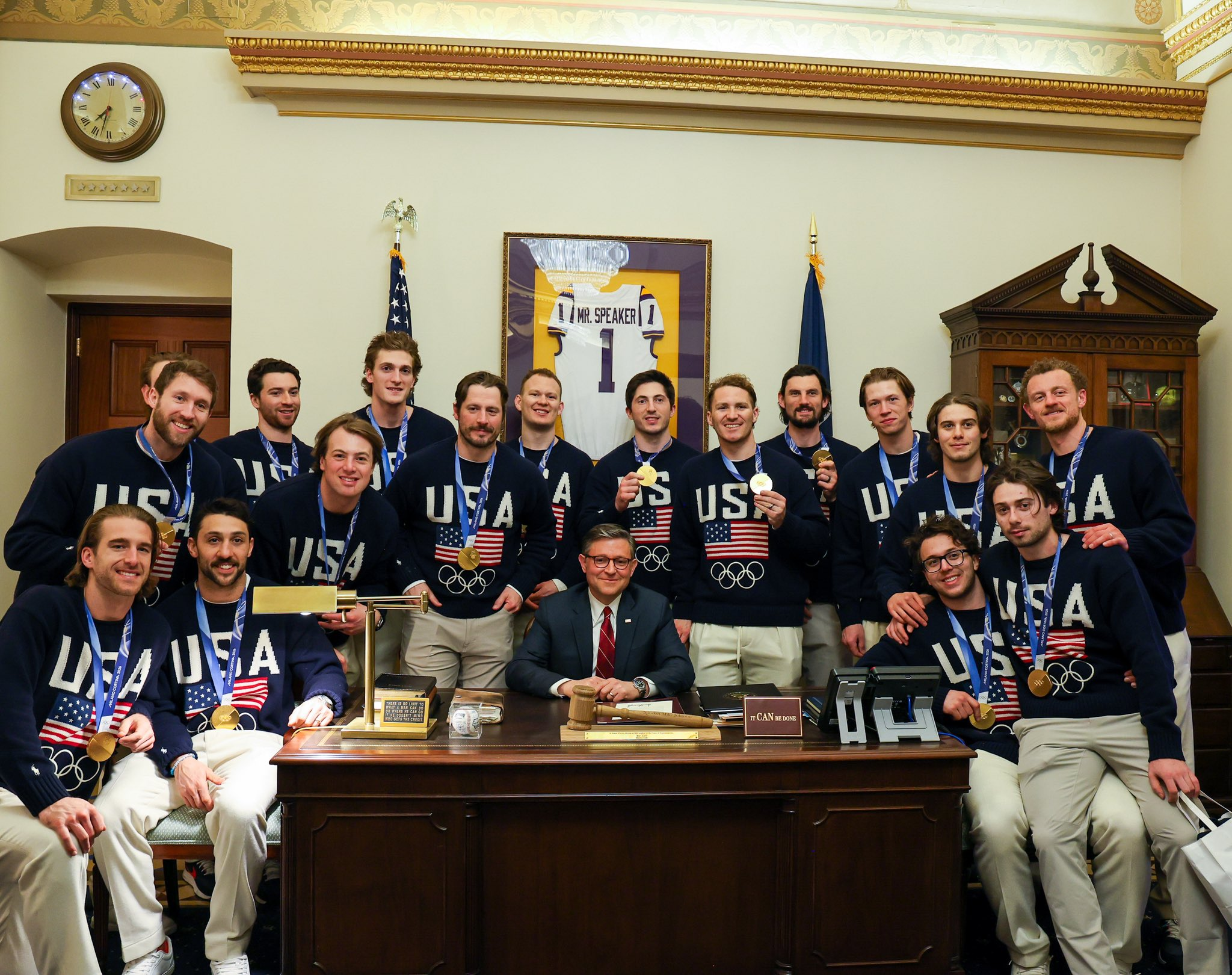
Thompson and teammates posing with House Speaker Mike Johnson during visit to the White House in February 2026

Thompson is a Christian. He married his wife Rachel in July 2021 after the pair met in college, with the pair having three children between 2022 and 2025. Thompson's wife was diagnosed with chondrosarcoma in 2018, and he highlighted his continued positivity and their relationship for the couple navigating her diagnosis.

== Career statistics ==
=== Regular season and playoffs ===
			Regular season					Playoffs
Season	Team	League	GP	G	A	Pts	PIM	GP	G	A	Pts	PIM
2013–14	P.A.L. Jr. Islanders 16U AAA	USPHL	16	17	14	31	8	—	—	—	—	—
2014–15	U.S. NTDP Juniors	USHL	25	7	7	14	20	—	—	—	—	—
2014–15	U.S. NTDP U18	USDP	64	12	14	26	32	—	—	—	—	—
2015–16	University of Connecticut	HE	36	14	18	32	12	—	—	—	—	—
2016–17	University of Connecticut	HE	34	19	13	32	24	—	—	—	—	—
2016–17	Chicago Wolves	AHL	16	1	1	2	2	10	2	1	3	4
2017–18	St. Louis Blues	NHL	41	3	6	9	12	—	—	—	—	—
2017–18	San Antonio Rampage	AHL	30	8	10	18	4	—	—	—	—	—
2018–19	Buffalo Sabres	NHL	65	7	5	12	20	—	—	—	—	—
2018–19	Rochester Americans	AHL	8	6	3	9	4	3	2	0	2	2
2019–20	Rochester Americans	AHL	16	6	6	12	8	—	—	—	—	—
2019–20	Buffalo Sabres	NHL	1	0	0	0	0	—	—	—	—	—
2020–21	Buffalo Sabres	NHL	38	8	6	14	17	—	—	—	—	—
2021–22	Buffalo Sabres	NHL	78	38	30	68	37	—	—	—	—	—
2022–23	Buffalo Sabres	NHL	78	47	47	94	39	—	—	—	—	—
2023–24	Buffalo Sabres	NHL	71	29	27	56	43	—	—	—	—	—
2024–25	Buffalo Sabres	NHL	76	44	28	72	35	—	—	—	—	—
2025–26	Buffalo Sabres	NHL	81	40	41	81	35	13	5	10	15	22
NHL totals			529	216	190	406	238	13	5	10	15	22

=== International ===
Year	Team	Event	Result	GP	G	A	Pts	PIM
2015	United States	U18	1st place, gold medalist(s)	7	0	1	1	2
2017	United States	WJC	1st place, gold medalist(s)	7	1	4	5	4
2018	United States	WC	3rd place, bronze medalist(s)	10	1	2	3	16
2021	United States	WC	3rd place, bronze medalist(s)	8	1	4	5	2
2025	United States	WC	1st place, gold medalist(s)	10	6	3	9	6
2026	United States	OG	1st place, gold medalist(s)	6	3	1	4	0
Junior totals				14	1	5	6	6
Senior totals				34	11	10	21	24

== Awards, honors, and records ==
Award	Year	Ref
College
Hockey East Third All-Star Team	2017	
NHL
NHL All-Star Game	2023	

=== Records ===
==== NHL ====
- Most goals in one period (4, tied with 16 others)

==== Buffalo Sabres ====
- Most goals in one game (5, tied with Dave Andreychuk)

Awards and achievements
Preceded by Robby Fabbri	St. Louis Blues first-round draft pick 2016	Succeeded by Robert Thomas
