= Tyler Moy =

American ice hockey player (born 1995)

- Born: July 18, 1995 (age 31) San Diego, California, U.S.
- Height: 6 ft 1 in (185 cm)
- Weight: 195 lb (88 kg; 13 st 13 lb)
- Position: Forward
- Shoots: Right
- NL team Former teams: SC Rapperswil-Jona Lakers; Lausanne HC; Genève-Servette HC
- National team: Switzerland
- NHL draft: 175th overall, 2015; Nashville Predators
- Playing career: 2017–present

Tyler Moy (born July 18, 1995) is a Swiss-American professional ice hockey player who is a forward for SC Rapperswil-Jona Lakers of the National League (NL). He previously played with Lausanne HC and Genève-Servette HC of the NL, and also within the Nashville Predators organization of the National Hockey League (NHL). Moy was drafted 175th overall by the Predators in the 2015 NHL entry draft.

== Early life ==
Moy father was Randy Moy (died July 7, 2020) was involved in ice hockey in the San Diego area for over 40 years. His Swiss mother Susanna had moved to California in the early 1990s.

== Playing career ==
Moy played college ice hockey for Harvard University. He was drafted 175th overall by the Nashville Predators in the 2015 NHL entry draft.

On April 10, 2017, Moy was signed to a two-year, entry-level contract by the Nashville Predators. He only played a full season within the organization in 2017–18, appearing in 72 games and putting up 16 points with their American Hockey League (AHL) affiliate, the Milwaukee Admirals.

On November 5, 2018, Moy was signed to a one-year contract by Lausanne HC of the National League (NL). On December 22, Moy was signed to an early two-year contract extension by Lausanne HC through to the end of the 2020/21 season.

On August 23, 2020, Moy was traded to Genève-Servette HC in exchange for Floran Douay and Guillaume Maillard.

On April 6, 2021, Moy agreed to an early two-year contract extension with Genève-Servette HC through the 2022–23 season.

On August 24, 2022, Moy signed a one-year contract with SC Rapperswil-Jona Lakers. On December 2, he signed a one-year contract extension. On October 23, 2023, Moy signed an early contract extension for the 2024–25 season.

On October 19, 2024, he signed a contract extension for the 2025–26 season, and on October 31, 2025, he was re-signed to a four-year deal.

== International play ==
Medal record

Men's ice hockey

Representing Switzerland

World Championships
Silver medal – second place	2025 Sweden/Denmark	

Moy represented Switzerland at the 2025 World Championship, where he led the team in scoring and recorded four goals and eight assists in 10 games and won a silver medal.
