= Nick Olesen =

Danish ice hockey player (born 1995)

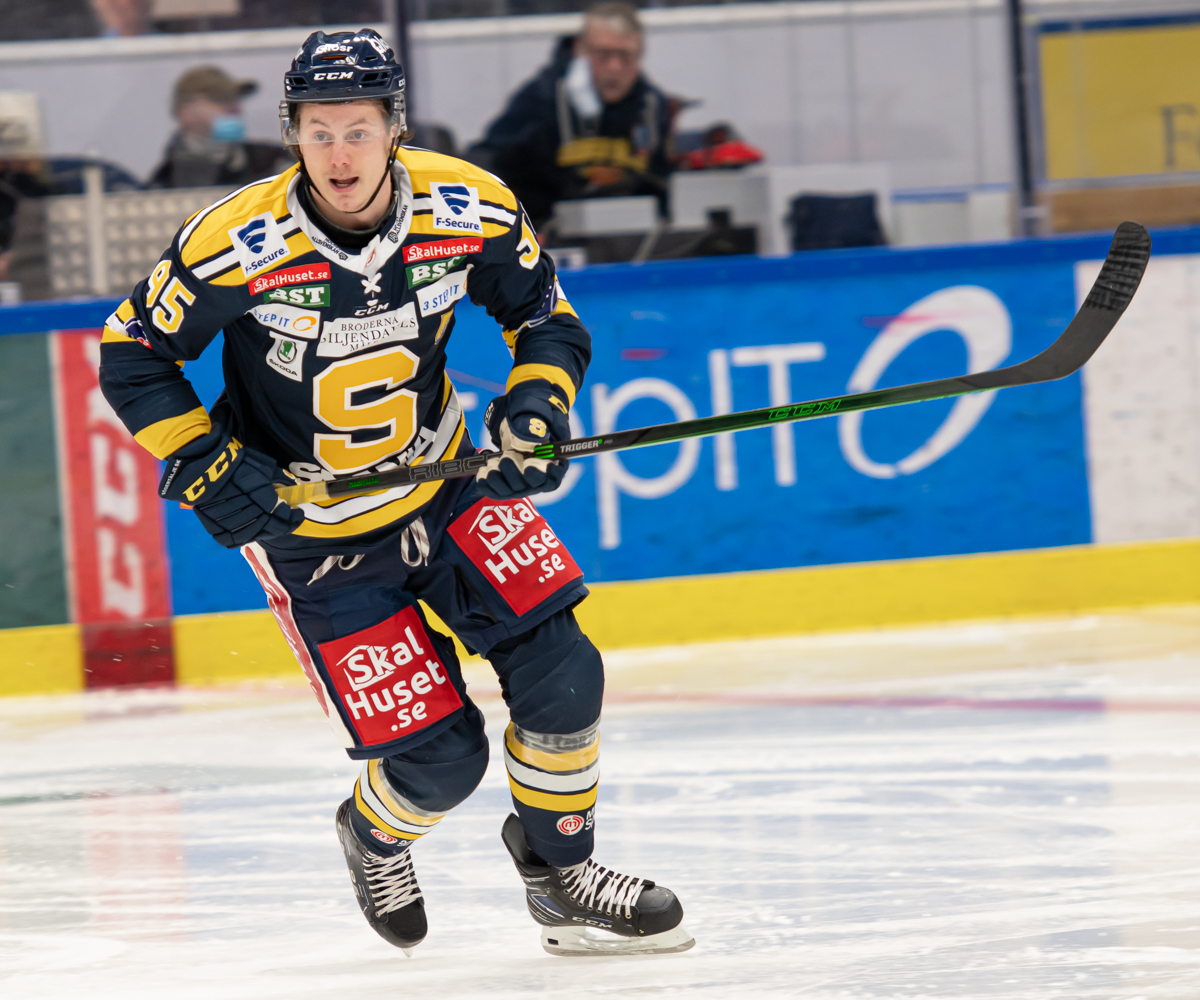
- Born: 14 November 1995 (age 30) Frederikshavn, Denmark
- Height: 6 ft 1 in (185 cm)
- Weight: 185 lb (84 kg; 13 st 3 lb)
- Position: Forward
- Shoots: Left
- ELH team Former teams: Motor České Budějovice; Odense Bulldogs; Frederikshavn White Hawks; Malmö Redhawks; IK Oskarshamn; Brynäs IF
- National team: Denmark
- Playing career: 2015–present

Nick Olesen (born 14 November 1995) is a Danish professional ice hockey player who is a forward for Motor České Budějovice of the Czech Extraliga (ELH). He previously played for IK Oskarshamn and Brynäs IF of the Swedish Hockey League (SHL).

== International play ==
He represented Denmark at the 2019 IIHF World Championship.

== Career statistics ==
=== Regular season and playoffs ===
			Regular season					Playoffs
Season	Team	League	GP	G	A	Pts	PIM	GP	G	A	Pts	PIM
2009–10	Frederikshavn White Hawks	DEN U17	3	1	0	1	0	—	—	—	—	—
2010–11	Frederikshavn White Hawks	DEN U17	19	17	19	36	45	—	—	—	—	—
2011–12	BIK Karlskoga	J18	22	6	2	8	6	—	—	—	—	—
2011–12	BIK Karlskoga	J18 Allsv	16	1	8	9	6	—	—	—	—	—
2011–12	BIK Karlskoga	J20 II	9	2	2	4	4	—	—	—	—	—
2012–13	BIK Karlskoga	J18	21	9	10	19	34	—	—	—	—	—
2012–13	BIK Karlskoga	J18 Allsv	17	7	7	14	53	—	—	—	—	—
2012–13	BIK Karlskoga	J20 II	8	1	5	6	12	—	—	—	—	—
2013–14	Växjö Lakers	J20	39	9	6	15	70	—	—	—	—	—
2014–15	Växjö Lakers	J20	15	5	4	9	43	—	—	—	—	—
2014–15	Odense Bulldogs	DEN	4	0	0	0	0	—	—	—	—	—
2014–15	RB Juniors Hockey	MHL	14	3	3	6	20	—	—	—	—	—
2015–16	Brunflo IK	SWE.3	31	18	13	31	30	—	—	—	—	—
2015–16	Frederikshavn White Hawks	DEN	8	1	1	2	0	13	3	1	4	4
2016–17	Frederikshavn White Hawks	DEN	45	17	6	23	10	15	9	2	11	29
2017–18	Frederikshavn White Hawks	DEN	50	29	24	53	10	4	1	2	3	4
2018–19	IK Pantern	Allsv	48	14	23	37	10	—	—	—	—	—
2018–19	Malmö Redhawks	SHL	1	0	1	1	2	—	—	—	—	—
2019–20	Södertälje SK	Allsv	50	28	23	51	68	1	2	3	5	0
2020–21	Södertälje SK	Allsv	48	20	33	53	48	4	1	0	1	2
2020–21	IK Oskarshamn	SHL	4	3	1	4	0	—	—	—	—	—
2021–22	Brynäs IF	SHL	49	8	9	17	6	3	0	1	1	0
2022–23	Brynäs IF	SHL	52	13	3	16	26	—	—	—	—	—
2023–24	IK Oskarshamn	SHL	52	8	12	20	18	—	—	—	—	—
2024–25	Motor České Budějovice	ELH	49	15	16	31	18	9	2	1	3	8
DEN totals			107	47	31	78	20	32	13	5	18	37
SHL totals			158	32	26	58	52	3	0	1	1	0

=== International ===
Year	Team	Event	GP	G	A	Pts	PIM
2013	Denmark	U18 D1A	5	1	1	2	2
2015	Denmark	WJC	5	1	1	2	2
2019	Denmark	WC	7	1	2	3	0
2021	Denmark	WC	7	0	1	1	4
2022	Denmark	OG	1	0	0	0	0
2023	Denmark	WC	7	1	1	2	0
2024	Denmark	WC	7	0	3	3	4
2025	Denmark	WC	10	5	7	12	4
2026	Denmark	OG	4	4	1	5	0
2026	Denmark	WC	7	1	8	9	6
Junior totals			10	2	2	4	4
Senior totals			50	12	23	35	18

== Awards and honors ==
Award	Year	Ref
International
IIHF World Championship All-Star team	2025	
