= Dean Kukan =

Swiss ice hockey player (born 1993)

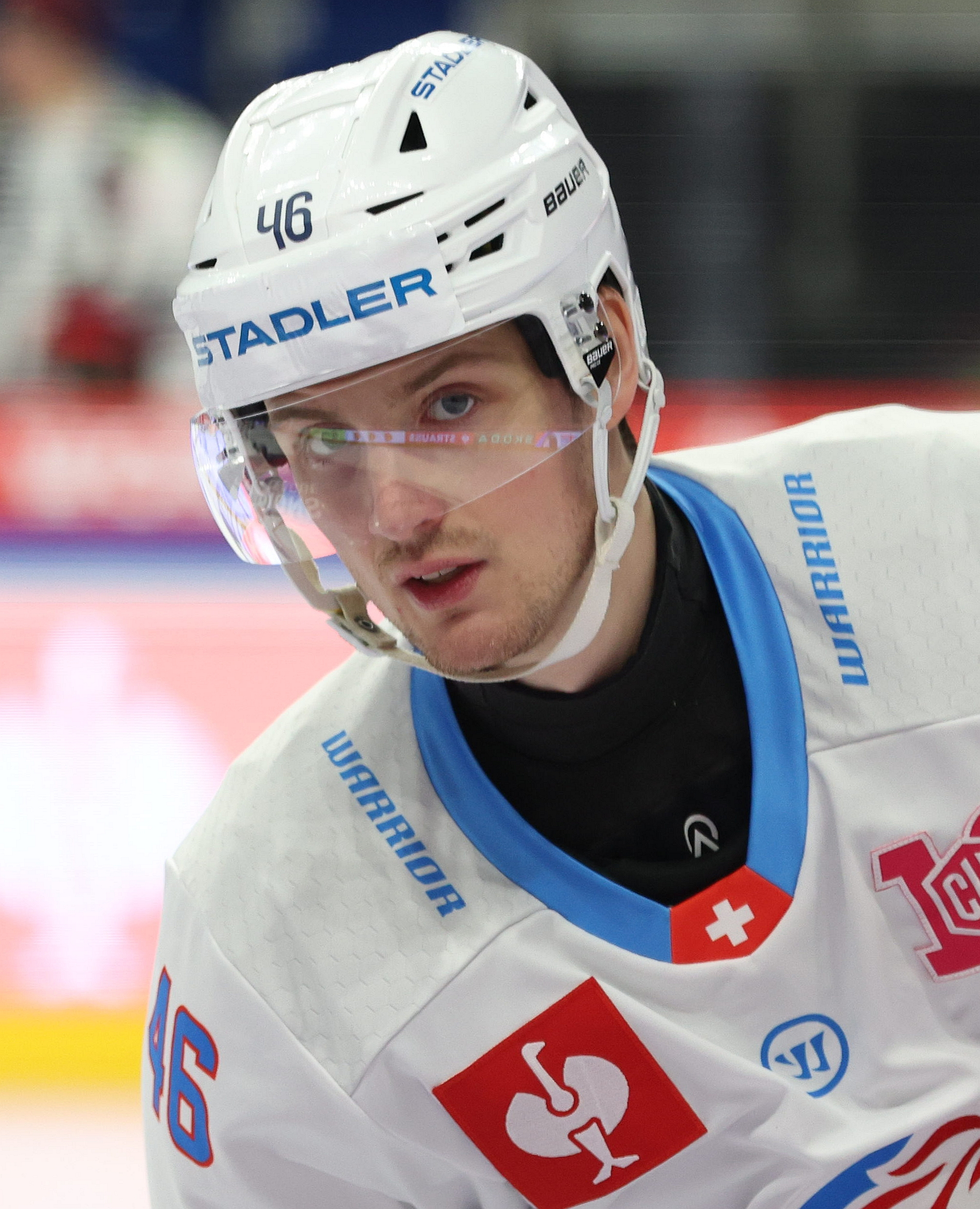
- Kukan with the ZSC Lions in 2024
- Born: 8 July 1993 (age 33) Volketswil, Switzerland
- Height: 6 ft 2 in (188 cm)
- Weight: 198 lb (90 kg; 14 st 2 lb)
- Position: Defence
- Shoots: Left
- NL team Former teams: ZSC Lions; Luleå HF; Columbus Blue Jackets
- National team: Switzerland
- NHL draft: Undrafted
- Playing career: 2009–present

Dean Kukan (born 8 July 1993) is a Swiss professional ice hockey player who is a defenceman for the ZSC Lions of the National League (NL). He is of Czech descent.

== Playing career ==
Kukan played in the 2006 Quebec International Pee-Wee Hockey Tournament with a youth team from Zürich. Undrafted, he made his European Elite debut during the 2010–11 season playing in the Swiss National League A with the ZSC Lions. After two seasons, Kukan left for Luleå HF in the Swedish Hockey League (SHL).

Kukan established a role on the blueline with Luleå HF over six seasons before using an NHL out-clause after the 2014–15 season, to sign a two-year entry-level contract with the Columbus Blue Jackets on 1 June 2015.

In the 2015–16 season, Kukan made his NHL debut on 26 March 2016, against the Nashville Predators at the Bridgestone Arena. He was reassigned to their AHL affiliate at the end of the Blue Jackets season and went on to win the 2016 Calder Cup.

On June 9, 2017, the Blue Jackets re-signed Kukan to a one-year, two-way extension. On February 7, 2020, Kukan was signed to a two-year contract extension by the Blue Jackets.

Following his seventh season in North America in 2021–22, and despite recording career bests with 3 goals and 11 points through 41 games with the Blue Jackets, Kukan, an impending free agent, opted to return to his native Switzerland. He rejoined his original club, ZSC Lions, on 1 June 2022 on a five-year contract through 2027.

== International play ==
Medal record

Representing Switzerland

Ice hockey

World Championships
Silver medal – second place	2018 Denmark	
Silver medal – second place	2024 Czechia	
Silver medal – second place	2025 Sweden/Denmark	
Silver medal – second place	2026 Switzerland	

Kukan participated at the 2012 World Junior Ice Hockey Championships as a member of the Switzerland men's national junior ice hockey team.

He represented Switzerland at the 2024 IIHF World Championship and won a silver medal.

== Career statistics ==
=== Regular season and playoffs ===
			Regular season					Playoffs
Season	Team	League	GP	G	A	Pts	PIM	GP	G	A	Pts	PIM
2008–09	ZSC Lions	SUI U17	27	1	2	3	4	10	0	5	5	4
2008–09	GCK Lions	SUI U20	8	0	1	1	0	5	0	0	0	2
2009–10	GCK Lions	SUI U20	13	1	5	6	2	9	0	4	4	2
2009–10	GCK Lions	NLB	29	0	6	6	14	—	—	—	—	—
2010–11	GCK Lions	SUI U20	2	0	1	1	0	10	0	0	0	6
2010–11	ZSC Lions	NLA	2	0	0	0	0	—	—	—	—	—
2010–11	GCK Lions	NLB	37	1	2	3	4	—	—	—	—	—
2011–12	Luleå HF	J20	42	5	16	21	8	3	0	2	2	2
2011–12	Luleå HF	SEL	3	0	0	0	0	—	—	—	—	—
2012–13	Luleå HF	J20	11	2	1	3	2	—	—	—	—	—
2012–13	Luleå HF	SEL	16	1	3	4	0	15	0	1	1	0
2012–13	Asplöven HC	Allsv	2	0	0	0	4	—	—	—	—	—
2012–13	Tingsryds AIF	Allsv	16	0	2	2	2	—	—	—	—	—
2013–14	Luleå HF	SHL	54	4	8	12	12	6	1	1	2	0
2014–15	Luleå HF	SHL	52	3	10	13	14	9	0	2	2	0
2015–16	Lake Erie Monsters	AHL	33	3	10	13	8	17	1	4	5	2
2015–16	Columbus Blue Jackets	NHL	8	0	0	0	0	—	—	—	—	—
2016–17	Cleveland Monsters	AHL	72	4	25	29	43	—	—	—	—	—
2017–18	Cleveland Monsters	AHL	32	1	14	15	20	—	—	—	—	—
2017–18	Columbus Blue Jackets	NHL	11	0	4	4	2	—	—	—	—	—
2018–19	Columbus Blue Jackets	NHL	25	0	5	5	6	10	1	0	1	2
2018–19	Cleveland Monsters	AHL	5	1	1	2	0	—	—	—	—	—
2019–20	Columbus Blue Jackets	NHL	33	1	4	5	12	9	0	1	1	7
2020–21	Columbus Blue Jackets	NHL	35	1	4	5	10	—	—	—	—	—
2021–22	Columbus Blue Jackets	NHL	41	3	8	11	16	—	—	—	—	—
2022–23	ZSC Lions	NL	49	7	24	31	8	9	2	3	5	6
2023–24	ZSC Lions	NL	40	3	22	25	8	15	2	9	11	0
2024–25	ZSC Lions	NL	51	8	16	24	22	16	3	5	8	14
SHL totals			125	8	21	29	26	30	1	4	5	0
NHL totals			153	5	25	30	46	19	1	1	2	9

=== International ===
Year	Team	Event	Result	GP	G	A	Pts	PIM
2010	Switzerland	U18	5th	6	0	3	3	0
2011	Switzerland	U18	7th	6	0	2	2	0
2012	Switzerland	WJC	8th	6	1	1	2	0
2013	Switzerland	WJC	6th	6	0	1	1	2
2014	Switzerland	WC	10th	7	1	0	1	2
2015	Switzerland	WC	8th	3	0	0	0	0
2017	Switzerland	WC	6th	8	0	1	1	2
2018	Switzerland	WC	2nd place, silver medalist(s)	10	1	2	3	0
2022	Switzerland	WC	5th	8	2	4	6	0
2023	Switzerland	WC	5th	7	0	4	4	4
2024	Switzerland	WC	2nd place, silver medalist(s)	10	1	2	3	6
2025	Switzerland	WC	2nd place, silver medalist(s)	10	1	8	9	2
2026	Switzerland	OG	5th	5	1	2	3	2
2026	Switzerland	WC	2nd place, silver medalist(s)	10	1	3	4	31
Junior totals				24	1	7	8	2
Senior totals				78	8	26	34	31

== Awards and honors ==
Awards	Year
AHL
Calder Cup (Lake Erie Monsters)	2016
AHL All-Star game	2018
NL
Champion (ZSC Lions)	2024, 2025
Swiss All-Star team	2024, 2025
All-Star team	2025
International
Champions Hockey League Champion (Luleå HF)	2015
IIHF World Championship Silver Medal	2018, 2024, 2025
IIHF World Championship All-Star team	2025
