= 2025 IIHF World Championship =

2025 edition of the IIHF World Championship

Tournament details
- Host countries: Sweden; Denmark
- Venues: 2
- Dates: 9–25 May
- Opened by: Carl XVI Gustaf; Frederik X
- Teams: 16

Final positions
- Champions: United States (3rd title)
- Runners-up: Switzerland
- Third place: Sweden
- Fourth place: Denmark

Tournament statistics
- Games played: 64
- Goals scored: 373 (5.83 per game)
- Attendance: 489,450 (7,648 per game)
- Scoring leader: (Czech Republic) David Pastrňák (15 points)

Awards
- MVP: (Switzerland) Leonardo Genoni

The 2025 IIHF World Championship was co-hosted by Stockholm, Sweden, and Herning, Denmark, from 9 to 25 May 2025. The International Ice Hockey Federation (IIHF) announced the host countries at the annual congress during the 2019 World Championships in Bratislava.

In the quarterfinals, Denmark defeated Canada 2–1, in one of the biggest upsets in World Championship history. (Note: Attributed to multiple sources:) Denmark subsequently played in their first semifinal, while Canada did not finish in the top four for the first time since 2014. Since the IIHF reintroduced a playoff system in 1992, the United States reached the World Championship final for the first time after having lost 12 consecutive semifinals, and won their first World Championship medal since a bronze in 2021. After losing their semifinal and the subsequent bronze medal game, Denmark achieved its first top four finish.

The United States won its third title, beating Switzerland 1–0 in overtime, ending a 92-year gold medal drought since 1933. It was also the team's first top two finish since 1960. Switzerland lost its second consecutive final.

This tournament was also the first time since the 2019 IIHF World Championship that both promoted teams (Hungary and Slovenia) stayed in the top division.

== Participants ==
Qualified as hosts

- Sweden
- Denmark

Automatic qualifier after a top 14 placement at the 2024 IIHF World Championship

- Austria
- Canada
- Czechia
- Finland
- France
- Germany
- Kazakhstan
- Latvia
- Norway
- Slovakia
- Switzerland
- United States

Qualified through winning promotion from the 2024 IIHF World Championship Division I

- Hungary
- Slovenia

== Seeding ==
The seedings in the preliminary round are based on the 2024 IIHF World Ranking, at the end of the 2024 IIHF World Championship, using the serpentine system while allowing the organizers, "to allocate a maximum of two teams to separate groups," while ensuring hosts Sweden and Denmark will be in separate groups.

Group A (Stockholm)

- Canada (1)
- Finland (3)
- Sweden (7)
- Slovakia (9)
- Latvia (10)
- Austria (13)
- France (14)
- Slovenia (19)

Group B (Herning)

- Czechia (4)
- Switzerland (5)
- United States (6)
- Germany (8)
- Denmark (11)
- Norway (12)
- Kazakhstan (15)
- Hungary (18)

== Marketing ==
=== Slogan ===
The slogan of the competition was pulse, and main phrase of it was "Feel the Pulse".

=== Mascot ===
The mascot of the event was called Beaty, a character with a heart-shaped face and bright cheeks.

== Rosters ==
Each team's roster consisted of at least 15 skaters (forwards and defencemen) and two goaltenders, and at most 22 skaters and three goaltenders. All 16 participating nations, through the confirmation of their respective national associations, had to submit a "Long List" no later than two weeks before the tournament, and a final roster by the Passport Control meeting prior to the start of the tournament.

== Match officials ==
16 referees and linesmen were announced on 7 May 2025.

Referees	Linesmen
(Austria) Christian Ofner; (Canada) Michael Campbell; (Canada) Mike Langin; (Czech Republic) Jan Hribik; (Denmark) Mads Frandsen; (Finland) Riku Brander; (Finland) Mikko Kaukokari; (Finland) Kristian Vikman; (Germany) André Schrader; (Latvia) Andris Ansons; (Slovakia) Peter Stano; (Sweden) Tobias Björk; (Sweden) Christoffer Holm; (Sweden) Mikael Holm; (Switzerland) Michael Tscherrig; (United States) Sean MacFarlane	(Canada) Tarrington Wyonzek; (Czech Republic) Daniel Hynek; (Czech Republic) Jiří Ondráček; (Denmark) Albert Ankerstjerne; (Finland) Onni Hautamäki; (Finland) Tommi Niittylä; (Germany) Patrick Laguzov; (United Kingdom) Danny Beresford; (Latvia) Dāvis Zunde; (Slovakia) Oto Durmis; (Sweden) Ludvig Lundgren; (Sweden) Anders Nyqvist; (Switzerland) Dominic Schlegel; (United States) Nick Briganti; (United States) Jake Davis; (United States) Shane Gustafson

== Venues ==
Sweden	2025 IIHF World Championship is located in Scandinavia	Denmark
Stockholm	2025 IIHF World Championship is located in Scandinavia	Herning
Avicii Arena; Capacity: 12,530	2025 IIHF World Championship is located in Scandinavia	Jyske Bank Boxen; Capacity: 10,500

== Preliminary round ==
The groups were announced on 30 May 2024, with the schedule being revealed on 19 August 2024.

=== Group A ===
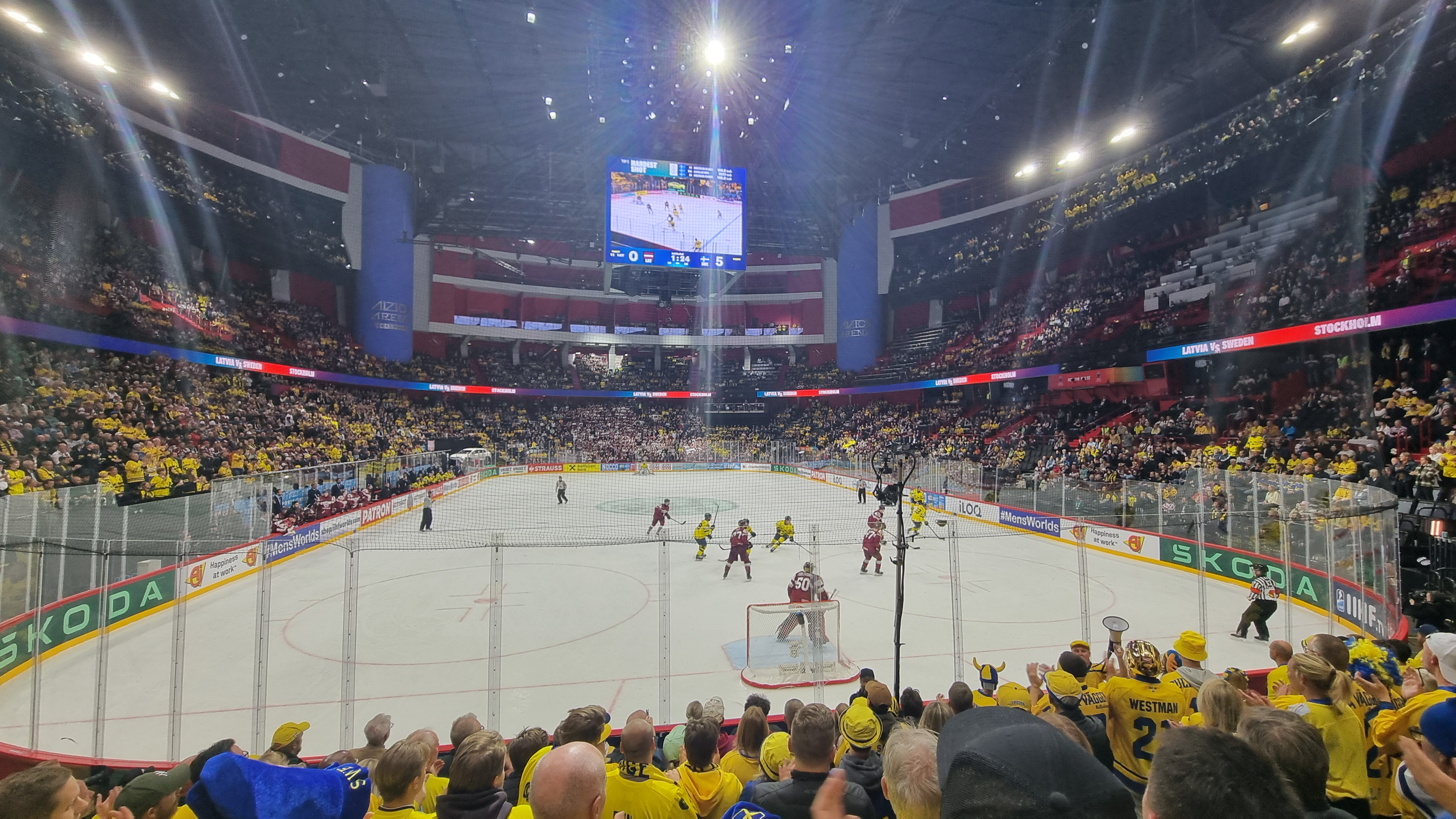
Sweden vs Latvia at the Avicii Arena

Pos	Team	Pld	W	OTW	OTL	L	GF	GA	GD	Pts	Qualification or relegation
1	Canada	7	6	0	1	0	34	7	+27	19	Quarterfinals
2	Sweden (H)	7	6	0	0	1	28	8	+20	18	Quarterfinals
3	Finland	7	4	2	0	1	22	10	+12	16	Quarterfinals
4	Austria	7	2	2	0	3	21	18	+3	10	Quarterfinals
5	Latvia	7	3	0	0	4	17	25	−8	9	Qualified for the 2026 IIHF World Championship
6	Slovakia	7	2	0	1	4	9	24	−15	7	Qualified for the 2026 IIHF World Championship
7	Slovenia	7	1	0	1	5	9	29	−20	4	Qualified for the 2026 IIHF World Championship
8	France	7	0	0	1	6	8	27	−19	1	Relegated to the 2026 Division I A

Source: IIHF
Rules for classification: 1) points; 2) head-to-head points; 3) head-to-head goal difference; 4) head-to-head number of goals scored; 5) result against closest best-ranked team outside tied teams; 6) result against second-best-ranked team outside tied teams; 7) seeding before tournament
(H) Host

9 May 2025
Austria	1–2	Finland
Sweden	5–0	Slovakia
10 May 2025
Slovenia	0–4	Canada
Sweden	4–2	Austria
France	1–4	Latvia
11 May 2025
Slovakia	3–1	Slovenia
Latvia	1–7	Canada
Finland	4–3 (OT)	France
12 May 2025
Austria	3–2 (GWS)	Slovakia
Finland	1–2	Sweden
13 May 2025
Slovenia	2–5	Latvia
Canada	5–0	France
14 May 2025
Slovakia	2–1	France
Latvia	0–6	Sweden
15 May 2025
Finland	9–1	Slovenia
Canada	5–1	Austria
16 May 2025
Austria	5–2	France
Sweden	4–0	Slovenia
17 May 2025
Finland	2–1	Latvia
France	0–4	Sweden
Canada	7–0	Slovakia
18 May 2025
Slovenia	2–3 (GWS)	Austria
Slovakia	1–5	Latvia
19 May 2025
France	1–3	Slovenia
Canada	1–2 (GWS)	Finland
20 May 2025
Latvia	1–6	Austria
Slovakia	1–2	Finland
Sweden	3–5	Canada

=== Group B ===
Pos	Team	Pld	W	OTW	OTL	L	GF	GA	GD	Pts	Qualification or relegation
1	Switzerland	7	6	0	1	0	34	9	+25	19	Quarterfinals
2	United States	7	5	1	0	1	34	14	+20	17 (Note: Czechia 2–5 United States)	Quarterfinals
3	Czechia	7	5	1	0	1	35	14	+21	17	Quarterfinals
4	Denmark (H)	7	3	1	0	3	25	24	+1	11	Quarterfinals
5	Germany	7	3	0	1	3	20	22	−2	10	Qualified for the 2026 IIHF World Championship
6	Norway	7	1	0	1	5	13	24	−11	4	Qualified for the 2026 IIHF World Championship
7	Hungary	7	1	0	0	6	8	39	−31	3 (Note: Kazakhstan 2–4 Hungary)	Qualified for the 2026 IIHF World Championship
8	Kazakhstan	7	1	0	0	6	9	32	−23	3	Relegated to the 2026 Division I A

Source: IIHF
Rules for classification: 1) points; 2) head-to-head points; 3) head-to-head goal difference; 4) head-to-head number of goals scored; 5) result against closest best-ranked team outside tied teams; 6) result against second-best-ranked team outside tied teams; 7) seeding before tournament
(H) Host
Notes:

9 May 2025
Switzerland	4–5 (OT)	Czechia
Denmark	0–5	United States
10 May 2025
Norway	1–2	Kazakhstan
Germany	6–1	Hungary
Denmark	2–5	Switzerland
11 May 2025
United States	6–0	Hungary
Germany	4–1	Kazakhstan
Norway	1–2	Czechia
12 May 2025
United States	0–3	Switzerland
Czechia	7–2	Denmark
13 May 2025
Norway	2–5	Germany
Kazakhstan	2–4	Hungary
14 May 2025
United States	6–5 (OT)	Norway
Kazakhstan	1–5	Denmark
15 May 2025
Switzerland	5–1	Germany
Czechia	6–1	Hungary
16 May 2025
Hungary	2–8	Denmark
Switzerland	3–0	Norway
17 May 2025
United States	6–3	Germany
Czechia	8–1	Kazakhstan
Denmark	6–3	Norway
18 May 2025
Kazakhstan	1–6	United States
Hungary	0–10	Switzerland
19 May 2025
Germany	0–5	Czechia
Hungary	0–1	Norway
20 May 2025
Switzerland	4–1	Kazakhstan
Czechia	2–5	United States
Germany	1–2 (GWS)	Denmark

== Playoff round ==
There was a re-seeding after the quarterfinals.

Quarter-finals
22 May
1A Canada	1
4B Denmark	2
22 May
1B Switzerland	6
4A Austria	0
22 May
2A Sweden	5
3B Czechia	2
22 May
2B United States	5
3A Finland	2

Semi-finals
24 May
2 Switzerland	7
7 Denmark	0
24 May
3 Sweden	2
4 United States	6

Final
25 May
2 Switzerland	0
4 United States(OT)	1
Third place
25 May
3 Sweden	6
7 Denmark	2

=== Final ===
25 May 2025; 20:20	Switzerland	0–1 OT (0–0, 0–0, 0–0) (OT: 0–1)	United States	Avicii Arena, Stockholm; Attendance: 12,530

Game reference
Leonardo Genoni	Goalies	Jeremy Swayman	Referees: (Canada) Michael Campbell (Sweden) Mikael Holm; Linesmen: (Denmark) Albert Ankerstjerne (Finland) Onni Hautamäki
0–1 / 62:02 – Thompson (Cooley, Skjei)			Referees: (Canada) Michael Campbell (Sweden) Mikael Holm; Linesmen: (Denmark) Albert Ankerstjerne (Finland) Onni Hautamäki
4 min	Penalties	4 min	Referees: (Canada) Michael Campbell (Sweden) Mikael Holm; Linesmen: (Denmark) Albert Ankerstjerne (Finland) Onni Hautamäki
25	Shots	40	Referees: (Canada) Michael Campbell (Sweden) Mikael Holm; Linesmen: (Denmark) Albert Ankerstjerne (Finland) Onni Hautamäki

== Final standings ==
Teams finishing fifth in the preliminary round were ranked ninth and tenth, teams finishing sixth were ranked 11th and 12th, and so on.

Pos	Grp	Team	Pld	W	OTW	OTL	L	GF	GA	GD	Pts	Final result
1	B	United States	10	7	2	0	1	46	18	+28	25	Champions
2	B	Switzerland	10	8	0	2	0	47	10	+37	26	Runners-up
3	A	Sweden (H)	10	8	0	0	2	41	18	+23	24	Third place
4	B	Denmark (H)	10	4	1	0	5	29	38	−9	14	Fourth place
5	A	Canada	8	6	0	1	1	35	9	+26	19	Eliminated in Quarterfinals
6	B	Czechia	8	5	1	0	2	37	19	+18	17	Eliminated in Quarterfinals
7	A	Finland	8	4	2	0	2	24	15	+9	16	Eliminated in Quarterfinals
8	A	Austria	8	2	2	0	4	21	24	−3	10	Eliminated in Quarterfinals
9	B	Germany	7	3	0	1	3	20	22	−2	10	Eliminated in Preliminary round
10	A	Latvia	7	3	0	0	4	17	25	−8	9	Eliminated in Preliminary round
11	A	Slovakia	7	2	0	1	4	9	24	−15	7	Eliminated in Preliminary round
12	B	Norway	7	1	0	1	5	13	24	−11	4	Eliminated in Preliminary round
13	A	Slovenia	7	1	0	1	5	9	29	−20	4	Eliminated in Preliminary round
14	B	Hungary	7	1	0	0	6	8	39	−31	3	Eliminated in Preliminary round
15	B	Kazakhstan	7	1	0	0	6	9	32	−23	3	Relegated to the 2026 IIHF World Championship Division I
16	A	France	7	0	0	1	6	8	27	−19	1	Relegated to the 2026 IIHF World Championship Division I

Source: IIHF
Rules for classification: 1) position in the group; 2) number of points; 3) goal difference; 4) goals scored; 5) seeding before tournament.
(H) Host

== Statistics ==
=== Scoring leaders ===
List shows the top skaters sorted by points, then goals.

Player	GP	G	A	Pts	+/−	PIM	POS
(Czech Republic) David Pastrňák	8	6	9	15	+7	4	F
(Sweden) Elias Lindholm	10	8	6	14	+8	0	F
(Czech Republic) Roman Červenka	8	6	8	14	+8	4	F
(Canada) Nathan MacKinnon	8	7	6	13	+9	10	F
(Canada) Travis Konecny	8	3	10	13	+9	12	F
(United States) Frank Nazar	10	6	6	12	+7	6	F
(Denmark) Nick Olesen	10	5	7	12	−3	4	F
(Canada) Sidney Crosby	8	4	8	12	+8	6	F
(United States) Logan Cooley	10	4	8	12	+4	10	F
(Switzerland) Tyler Moy	10	4	8	12	+8	0	F

GP = Games played; G = Goals; A = Assists; Pts = Points; +/− = Plus/Minus; PIM = Penalties in Minutes; POS = Position
Source: IIHF

=== Goaltending leaders ===
Only the top five goaltenders, based on save percentage, who have played at least 40% of their team's minutes, are included in this list.

Player	TOI	GA	GAA	SA	Sv%	SO
(Switzerland) Leonardo Genoni	424:32	7	0.99	150	95.33	4
(Czech Republic) Daniel Vladař	219:52	4	1.09	81	95.06	1
(Canada) Jordan Binnington	239:15	5	1.25	90	94.44	2
(Finland) Juuse Saros	358:50	10	1.67	174	94.25	0
(Sweden) Samuel Ersson	259:06	5	1.16	76	93.42	2

TOI = time on ice (minutes:seconds); SA = shots against; GA = goals against; GAA = goals against average; Sv% = save percentage; SO = shutouts
Source: IIHF.com

== Awards ==
The awards were announced on 25 May 2025.

=== Media All Stars ===
Position	Player
Goaltender	(Switzerland) Leonardo Genoni
Defenceman	(United States) Zach Werenski
Defenceman	(Switzerland) Dean Kukan
Forward	(Czech Republic) David Pastrňák
Forward	(Sweden) Elias Lindholm
Forward	(Denmark) Nick Olesen
MVP	(Switzerland) Leonardo Genoni

=== Individual awards ===
Position	Player
Goaltender	(Switzerland) Leonardo Genoni
Defenceman	(United States) Zach Werenski
Forward	(Czech Republic) David Pastrňák

== IIHF contributors' awards ==
The annual IIHF contributors' awards ceremony was on 24 May 2025, prior to the semifinal games of the men's championship.

Award recipients

- Jon Haukeland of Norway received the Paul Loicq Award for outstanding contributions to international ice hockey.
- Leszek Laszkiewicz of Poland received the Torriani Award for a player with an outstanding career from non-top hockey nation.
- The IIHF Milestone Award was given to the 2002/2003 Denmark men's national ice hockey teams, and the 2006 Sweden men's national ice hockey team.
- Jim Aldred of Portugal received the Johan Bollue Award for contributions to growth and development in youth ice hockey.
- Paul Graham of The Sports Network received the IIHF Media Award for outstanding contributions to international hockey through television, print, and radio.

== IIHF Hall of Fame induction ==
The IIHF Hall of Fame induction ceremony took place on 25 May 2025, during the medal presentations of the men's championship.

IIHF Hall of Fame inductees

- Zdeno Chára, Slovakia
- Kai Hietarinta, Finland
- Henrik Lundqvist, Sweden
- Kim Martin Hasson, Sweden
- Frans Nielsen, Denmark
- Vicky Sunohara, Canada
- David Výborný, Czechia
