= Mika Zibanejad =

Swedish ice hockey player (born 1993)

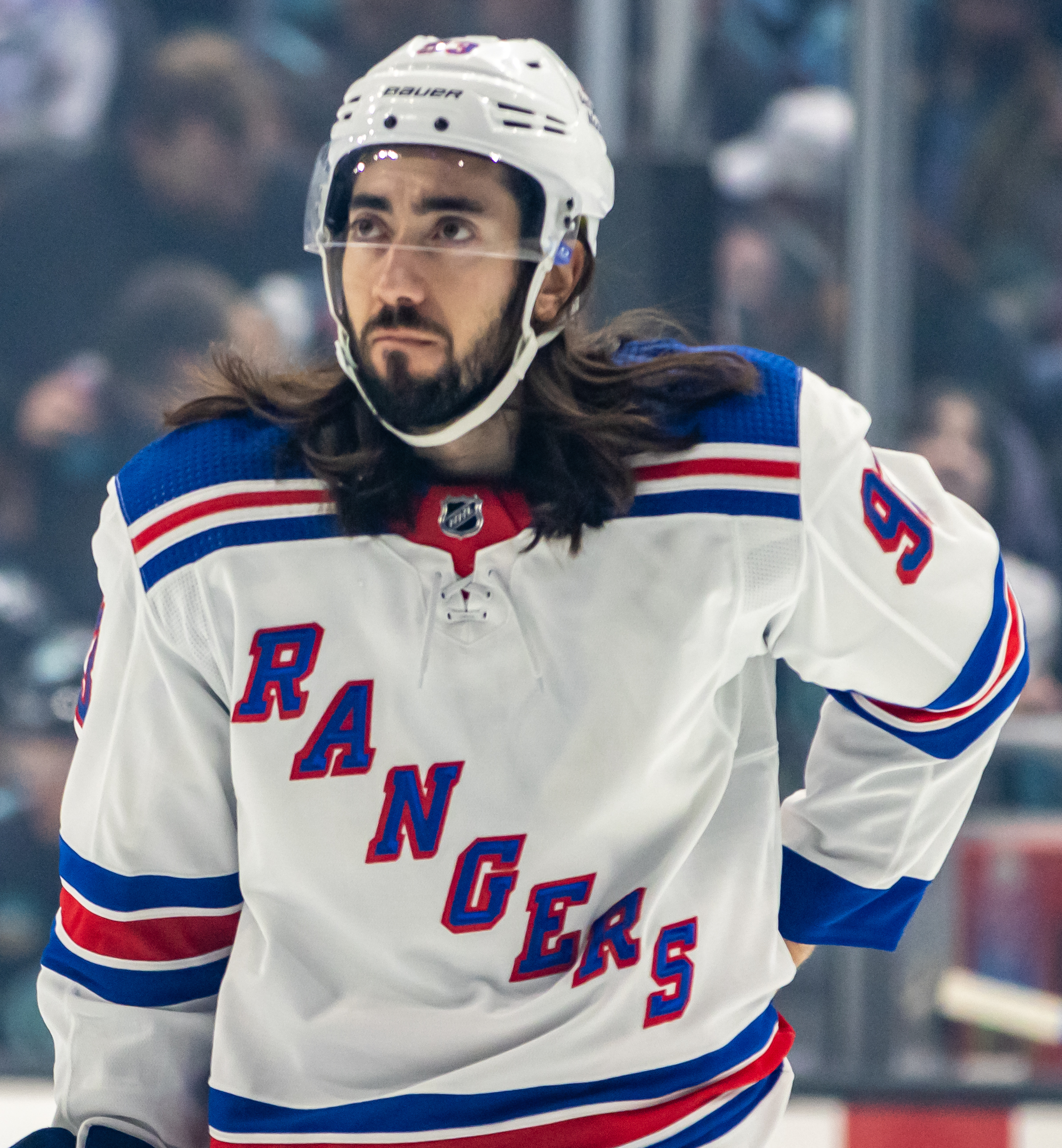
- Zibanejad with the New York Rangers in 2023
- Born: 18 April 1993 (age 33) Huddinge, Sweden
- Height: 6 ft 2 in (188 cm)
- Weight: 215 lb (98 kg; 15 st 5 lb)
- Position: Centre
- Shoots: Right
- NHL team Former teams: New York Rangers; Djurgårdens IF; Ottawa Senators
- National team: Sweden
- NHL draft: 6th overall, 2011; Ottawa Senators
- Playing career: 2010–present

Mika Zibanejad (born 18 April 1993) is a Swedish professional ice hockey player who is a centre and alternate captain for the New York Rangers of the National Hockey League (NHL) and the Swedish national team. Zibanejad was selected sixth overall in the 2011 NHL entry draft by the Ottawa Senators. He made the Senators lineup out of training camp to start the 2011–12 season, but was returned to Djurgårdens IF in Sweden after scoring one point in nine NHL games with Ottawa. On 18 July 2016, after five seasons within the Senators organization, Zibanejad was traded to the Rangers.

Zibanejad has represented Sweden on the international stage, helping the junior team win the 2012 World Junior Championships and the senior team win the 2018 World Championship.

== Club career ==
Zibanejad played association football as a child before deciding to pursue hockey. He began playing hockey at the age of six in Hammarby IF, where he played a total of seven seasons before the club went bankrupt in 2008.

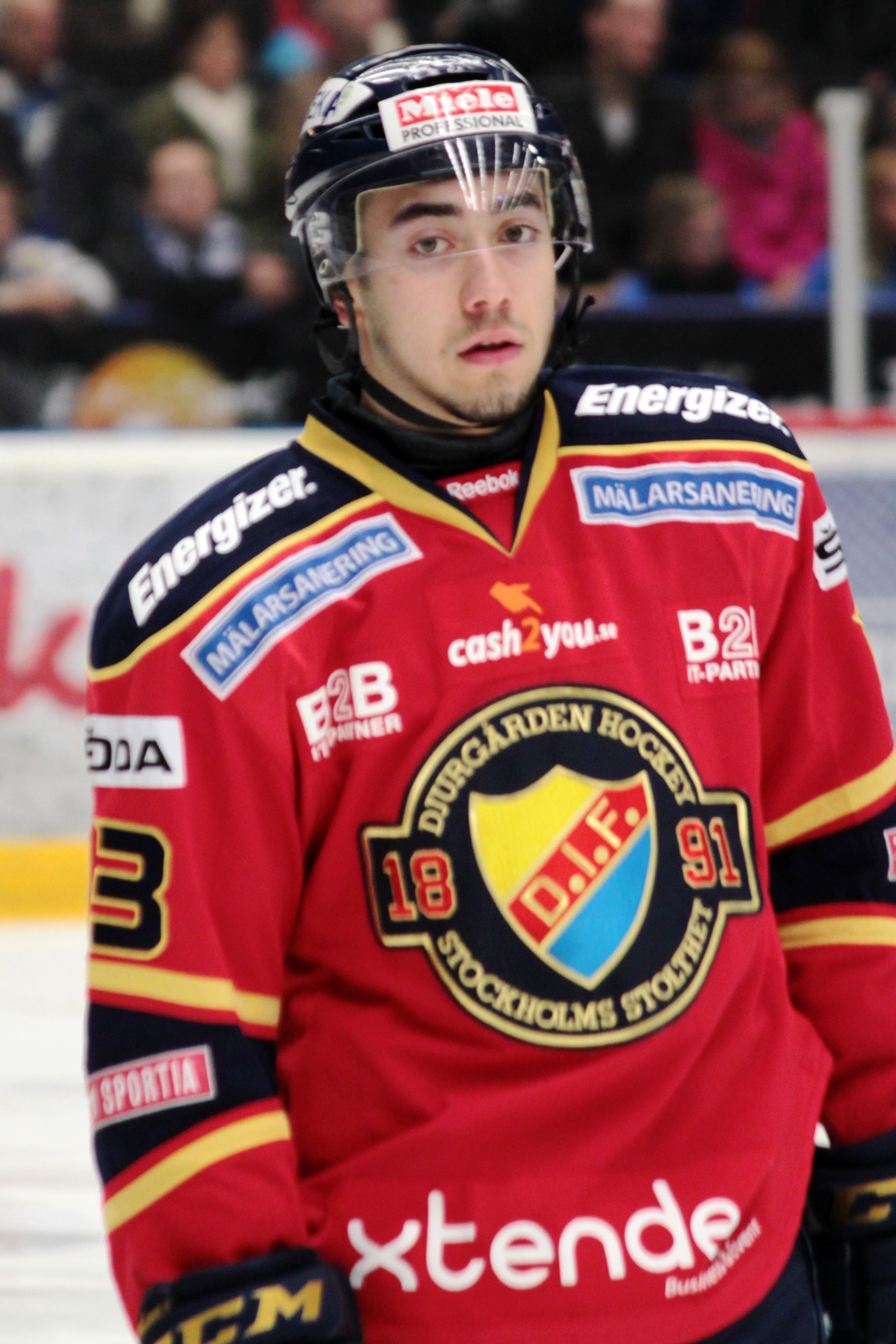
Zibanejad with Djurgårdens IF in 2012.

Zibanejad then moved to AIK IF's youth organisation for the following season, where he began playing junior hockey. He was acquired by Djurgårdens IF for the 2009–10 season to play in the organisation's J18-team and J20-team. Zibanejad made his Elitserien debut on 7 December 2010, against Luleå HF, and scored his first Elitserien goal on 15 January 2011, against Tuomas Tarkki of Modo Hockey. He was drafted in the sixth round of the 2010 KHL Junior Draft by Lokomotiv Yaroslavl, 129th overall.

On 7 February 2011, Zibanejad signed a two-year contract extension with Djurgården. Zibanejad became a regular player in the senior roster after his debut, playing in 26 of the remaining 29 games. He scored five goals and nine points, which made him the third-most-successful junior player 18 years or younger in the organisation and playing with the senior team, behind Fredrik Bremberg and Jacob Josefson.

=== Ottawa Senators ===
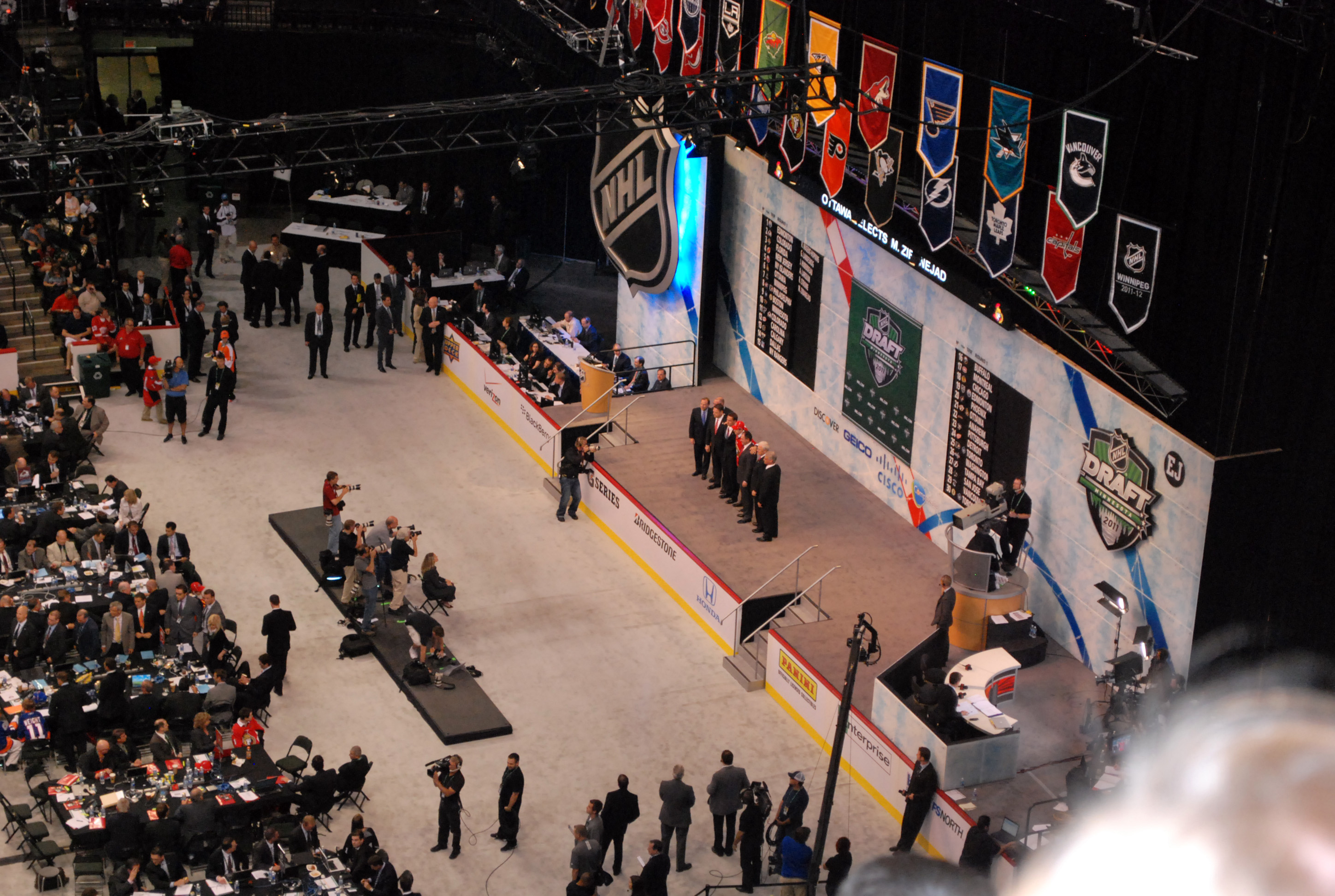
Zibanejad being selected sixth overall in the 2011 NHL entry draft

On 13 July 2011, Zibanejad signed a three-year, entry-level contract with the Ottawa Senators, the team that drafted him sixth overall in the 2011 NHL entry draft. After an impressive training camp, Zibanejad joined the Senators for their first game of the 2011–12 season. He registered his first career NHL point in his first game, an assist on a goal by Filip Kuba in a 5–3 loss to the Detroit Red Wings. After one point in nine games played, Zibanejad was reassigned to his most recent club, Djurgårdens IF, on 26 October.

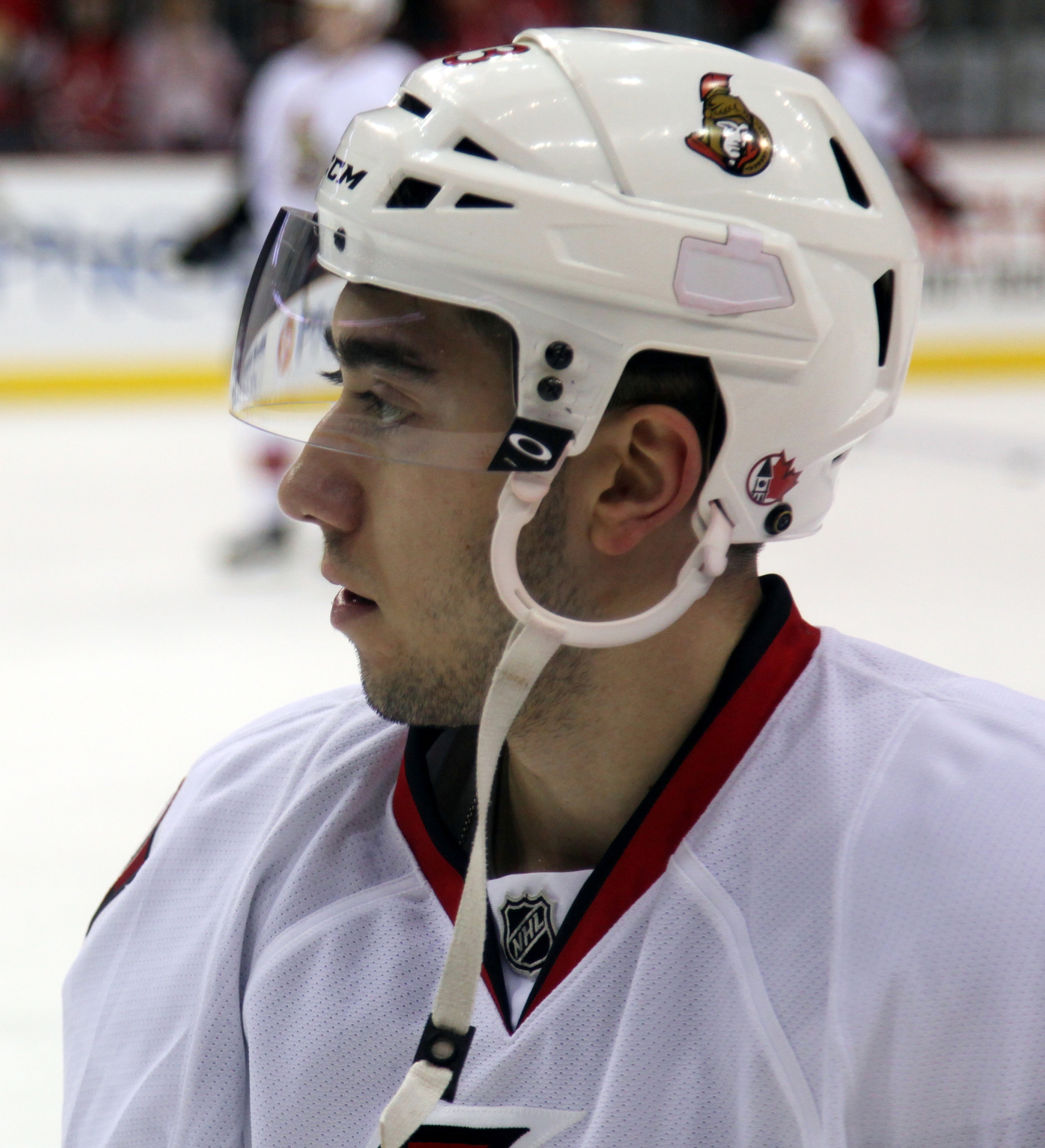
Zibanejad with the Ottawa Senators in 2013

In June 2012, Zibanejad was rumoured to be a key part of a package Ottawa was offering to the Columbus Blue Jackets in exchange for Rick Nash. The offer was allegedly withdrawn when Columbus general manager Scott Howson informed the Senators Nash was unwilling to waive his no-trade clause to accept a move to Ottawa.

In August 2012, the Senators announced Zibanejad would spend the 2012–13 season in North America, either in the NHL with the Senators or with the club's American Hockey League (AHL) affiliate, the Binghamton Senators. Due to the NHL lockout, Zibanejad began the season with Binghamton, where he registered 11 points in 23 games while battling injuries. He was called up to Ottawa on 28 January 2013, and played in his first NHL game of the season on 29 January against the Washington Capitals, a game in which he was selected as the first star. The following night, on 30 January in a game against the Montreal Canadiens, Zibanejad scored his first career NHL goal. The goal came on the power play against goaltender Peter Budaj and with assists from Colin Greening and André Benoit. In the 2015–16 season, Zibanejad scored a career-high 21 goals with 30 assists.

=== New York Rangers ===
On 18 July 2016, Zibanejad was traded by the Senators to the New York Rangers, along with a 2018 second-round pick, in exchange for Derick Brassard and a 2018 seventh-round pick. He had one year remaining on his contract before becoming eligible as a restricted free agent whereas Brassard had three left on his.

On 20 November 2016, during a game against the Florida Panthers, Zibanejad suffered a gruesome injury in overtime when he went hard with his left leg into the boards while trying to get in front of Reilly Smith. After the game, which the Rangers eventually lost 3–2 in a shootout, it was announced that he had broken his left fibula and would miss six to eight weeks. He returned to the Rangers lineup against the Dallas Stars on 17 January 2017 after missing 25 games; he scored two goals in the 7–6 Rangers loss. The Rangers made the 2017 playoffs at the end of the season. On 20 April 2017, Zibanejad scored the overtime winning goal in game 5 of the first round against the Montreal Canadiens. After the Rangers eliminated the Canadiens, Zibanejad met his former team, the Senators, in the conference semifinals. Ottawa would triumph in six games but Zibanejad led his team in scoring during the playoffs, registering nine points in 12 games.

After trading first-line centre Derek Stepan, the Rangers avoided arbitration with Zibanejad, signing him to a five-year, $26.75 million contract extension on 25 July 2017. With Stepan's departure, this made Zibanejad the Rangers' new first line centre for the 2017–18 season. The Rangers failed to make the playoffs for the first time since 2010, and announced they were rebuilding and proceeded to jettison veteran players while retaining young talent like Zibanejad. Zibanejad primarily lined up with Chris Kreider and Pavel Buchnevich, but also saw significant time with Jesper Fast. By the end of the season, there were still questions as to whether he was a true first line centre. In the following season, Zibanejad was once again played as the Rangers' top centre, lining up between Kreider and Buchnevich. However, this was the first year of the Rangers' rebuild and they failed to reach the playoffs again. Despite that, Zibanejad broke out, reaching the 30-goal plateau for the first time in his career and led the team in scoring.

In the off-season, the Rangers added Artemi Panarin and he was placed on Zibanejad's line to begin the season. Zibanejad scored a goal and three assists in the Rangers' 2019–20 season opener on 3 October 2019, and followed that game with his third career hat-trick against the Ottawa Senators on 5 October. He also posted an assist in the game, becoming the sixth player in NHL history with four-point games in each of the first two games of the season, and the first player to do so since John Cullen of the Pittsburgh Penguins in 1990. He was the second player in Rangers history to post eight points through the first two games of the season, the fourth in franchise history to score six or more points in that span, and the first in both cases since Rod Gilbert in 1976–77. Zibanejad's game on 5 October made him the first Rangers player with an even strength goal, a power play goal, and a short-handed goal in an away game since Petr Nedved in 2000, and the first Ranger to do so in any game since Derek Stepan in 2014. On 8 October, he was named NHL's First Star of the Week. After his hot start, Zibanejad missed time with an injury suffered after a high cross-check from Boston Bruins forward Patrice Bergeron. During his absence, Panarin found chemistry with Ryan Strome. However, after Zibanejad's return Panarin returned to his wing for a short period before being split up.

On 5 March 2020, Zibanejad became the third player in Rangers history to score five goals in a game in a 6–5 win over the Capitals, joining Don Murdoch, who set the mark on 12 October 1976 against the Minnesota North Stars, and Mark Pavelich on 23 February 1983 versus the Hartford Whalers. Among Zibanejad's tallies was the overtime winner, making him only the second player in NHL history to complete the quintet of goals in the extra period. (The other was Sergei Fedorov, who did the same on 26 December 1996, also against Washington.) Zibanejad had a good season and the Rangers made the playoffs. They faced the Carolina Hurricanes in the first round of an abbreviated playoff series due to the COVID-19 pandemic. In the first game, Zibanejad had a goal and two points in a 3–2 loss. The Rangers only scored twice more in the series as they were swept by the Hurricanes.

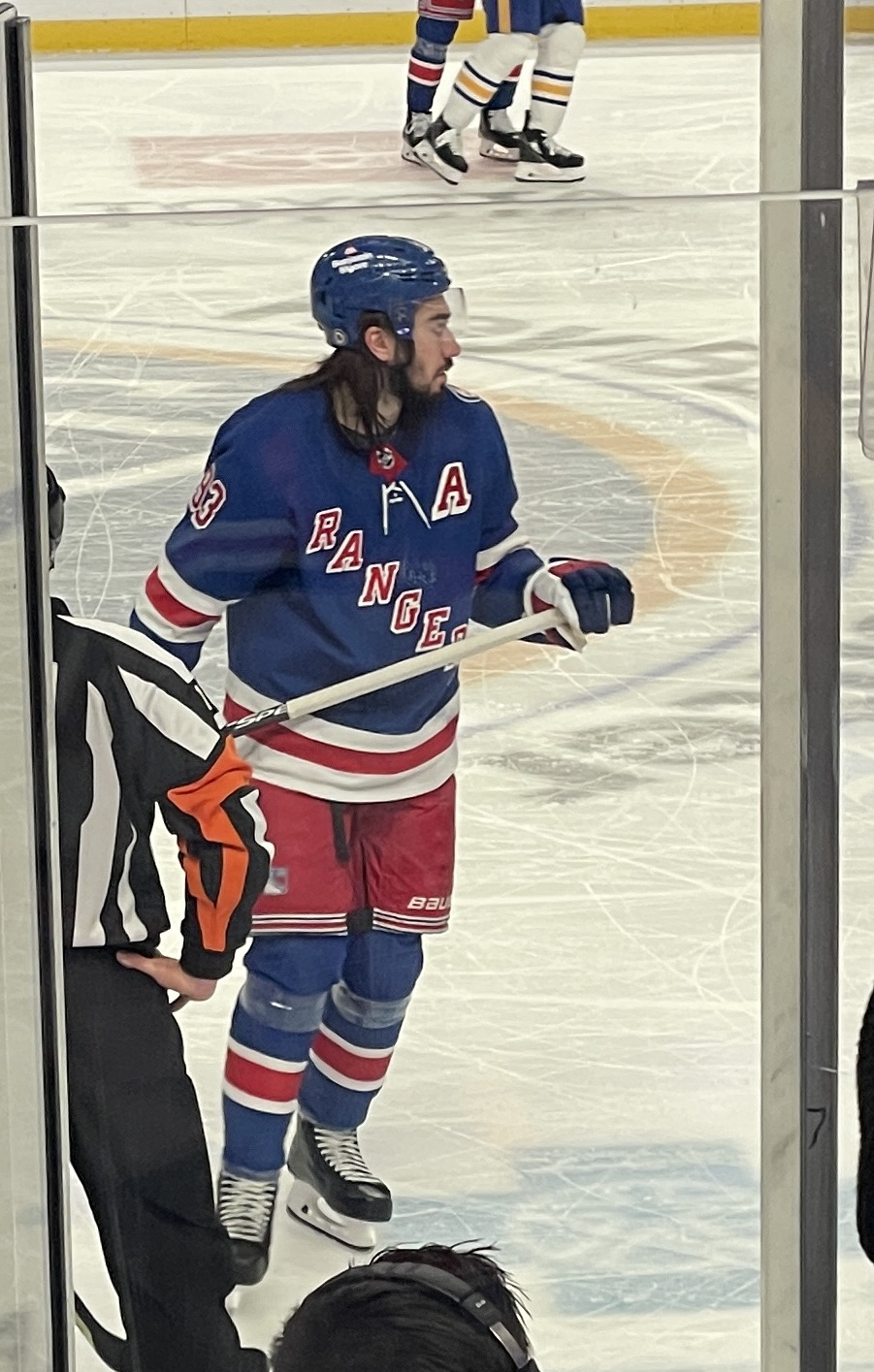
Zibanejad with the New York Rangers in 2021

After scoring only three goals in 27 games to start the 2020–21 NHL season, Zibanejad scored a natural hat trick on 17 March 2021 in the second period of a game against the Philadelphia Flyers. That same game, he tied the NHL record for most points in one period set in 1978 by Bryan Trottier with six. The Rangers eventually won the game 9–0. He scored another hat trick a week later on 25 March in a subsequent game against the Flyers, a match the Rangers won 8–3. Accomplishing these feats, he became the third NHL player to score a natural hat trick in consecutive games against the same opponent in a single season after Thomas Vanek and Peter Bondra. On 25 April 2021, during a game against the Buffalo Sabres, Zibanejad scored his seventh career hat trick (third of the season). Zibanejad finished the season with 24 goals and 50 points in 56 games. However, the Rangers failed to make the playoffs, finishing fifth in their division.

On 10 October 2021, Zibanejad signed an eight-year contract extension with the Rangers. As part of the announcement, Zibanejad was also named an alternate captain of the team. On 18 January 2022, Zibanejad was voted to his first All-Star game through the NHL "Last Men In" fan vote. However, he decided not to attend for personal reasons. This was his first career All-Star selection. The Rangers made the playoffs and defeated the Pittsburgh Penguins in seven games in the first round. In game 7, Zibanejad registered a goal and two assists to beat the Penguins in overtime 4–3. The Rangers then eliminated the Carolina Hurricanes in the second round, again in seven games. Zibanejad carried an eight-game point streak into the conference finals versus the Tampa Bay Lightning, but it ended in game 4 and the Rangers were eliminated in six games.

For the 2022–23 season, Zibanejad once again began the season as the Rangers top centre. On 17 October 2022, Zibanejad had two goals and four points in a 6–4 win over the Anaheim Ducks. Zibanejad was one of the NHL's three stars for the week of 20 March 2023, registering five goals and nine points in four games. He finished the season with a team-leading 39 goals and second on the team with 91 points. The Rangers faced the Devils in the first round of the 2023 Stanley Cup playoffs. Facing elimination in game 6, the Rangers coach moved Vladimir Tarasenko to the first line with Zibanejad and Kreider. Zibanejad scored a goal and had two points to keep the season alive. However, the Devils eliminated the Rangers in the next game.

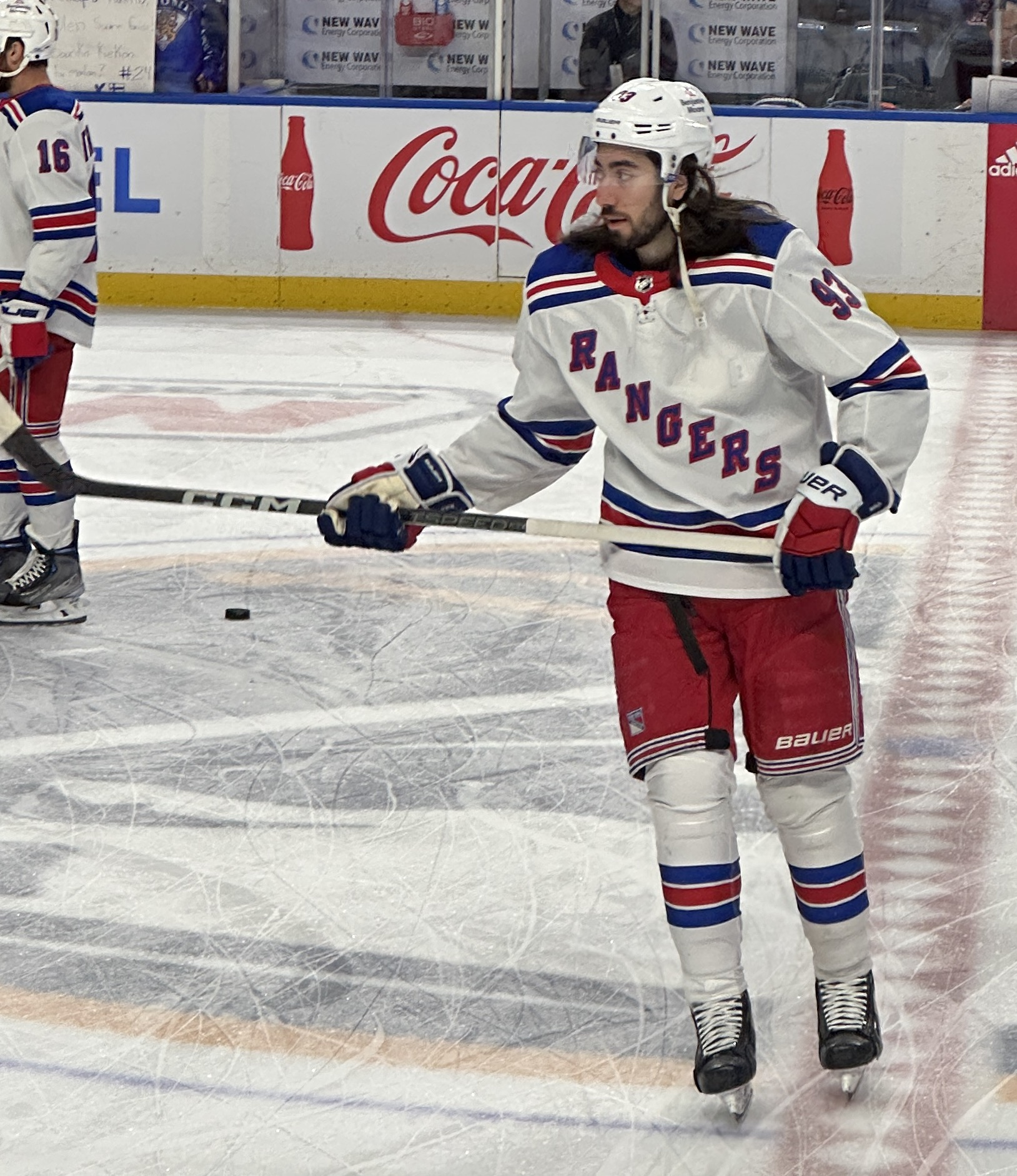
Zibanejad with the New York Rangers in 2023

Ahead of the 2023–24 season, the Rangers hired Peter Laviolette as their head coach after the resignation of Gerard Gallant after the 2022–23 season. Zibanejad was named as one of the NHL's three stars of the week for the week 18-24 December 2023, scoring four goals and seven points in three games. Zibanejad played in his 800th NHL game on 27 December 2023, scoring two assists in a 5–1 win against the Capitals. The Rangers played in the 2024 NHL Stadium Series, where he scored the tying goal with under two minutes remaining in an eventual 6–5 Rangers overtime win over the New York Islanders. On 28 February 2024, the Rangers were the first team in the NHL to reach 40 wins, and went on to win the President's Trophy with the most points in the NHL. Zibanejad finished the regular season with 26 goals and 72 points. The Rangers faced the Washington Capitals in the first round of the 2024 Stanley Cup playoffs, with Zibanejad notching two assists in the final game of a four game Rangers sweep of the Capitals to finish the series with one goal and six points. In the conference semifinals, the Rangers played the Carolina Hurricanes. The Rangers won the series in six games, with Zibanejad scoring two goals and seven points. In the conference finals, the Rangers came up against the Florida Panthers. Zibanejad scored two assists in the series, as the Rangers fell in six games to the eventual Stanley Cup champions. He finished the playoffs with 16 points in 16 games.

Zibanejad started the 2024–25 season with seven points in nine games. After a 12–4–1 stretch to start the season, the Rangers finished with a 39–36–7 record, landing them in fifth in the Metropolitan division. They were eliminated from 2025 Stanley Cup playoff contention on 12 April 2025, with a 7–3 loss to the Carolina Hurricanes. Zibanejad scored 20 goals and 62 points in the Rangers' first season out of the playoffs since 2020–21.

During the 2025–26 season, the Rangers participated in the 2026 NHL Winter Classic. During the game, Zibanejad became the first player to record a hat-trick during a Winter Classic as the Rangers defeated the Florida Panthers 5–1. Going into the Olympic break, Zibanejad had scored 23 goals and provided 29 assists for 52 points in 56 games by early February 2026 in the season. Zibanejad played in his 1,000th career NHL game on 23 March, against the Ottawa Senators, the only other team he has played with in the NHL.

== International career ==
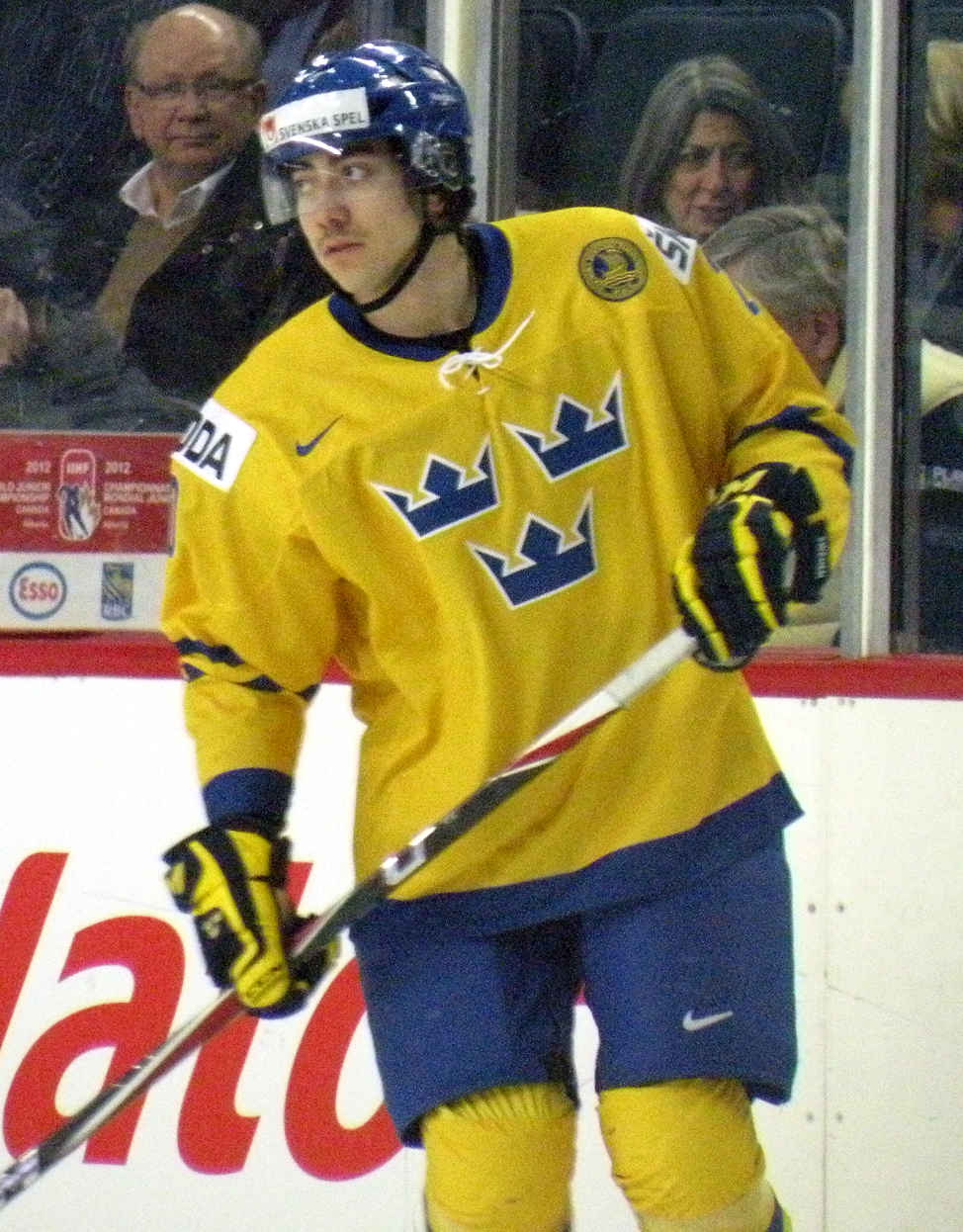
- Zibanejad skating with the Swedish team at the 2012 World Junior Championships.

Medal record

Men's ice hockey

Representing Sweden

World Championships
| Gold medal – first place | 2018 Denmark | |
| Bronze medal – third place | 2025 Sweden/Denmark | |

World Junior Championships
| Gold medal – first place | 2012 Calgary | |

World U18 Championships
| Silver medal – second place | 2011 Germany | |

World U-17 Hockey Challenge
| Bronze medal – third place | 2010 Ontario | |

Internationally, Zibanejad has represented Sweden at the youth, junior, and senior levels. On 5 January 2012, Zibanejad scored the gold medal-winning golden goal for Sweden in the 2012 World Junior Championships against Russia in the tournament final; the game finished 1–0. On 20 May 2018, Zibanejad scored a goal in the final for Sweden to help them win the 2018 World Championship. He finished the tournament among the scoring leaders, recording six goals and five assists.

On 4 December 2024, Zibanejad was named in Sweden's roster for the inaugural 4 Nations Face-Off. He scored the opening goal of the game against Finland on 15 February 2025. Ultimately, they lost the game 4–3. He missed the team's third game due to illness as the Swedes were eliminated from the tournament by the United States.

On 2 May 2025, Zibanejad was named an alternate captain for Sweden's roster at the 2025 World Championship. He scored a goal in Sweden's opening game of the tournament against Slovakia on 9 May 2025. In the following match on 10 May 2025 against Austria, Zibanejad scored twice, including the game-winning goal, bringing his tally to three goals in two games. He added another goal to his tally on 14 May against Latvia. On 22 May, in the quarterfinals against defending champions Czechia, Zibanejad provided an assist and a secondary assist to help lead Sweden to the semifinals. Zibanejad scored a goal and provided a secondary assist in their final game of the tournament on 25 May against Denmark to help Sweden win the bronze medal at Avicii Arena in Stockholm. He tallied five goals and three assists over the course of the tournament.

On 2 January 2026, Zibanejad was named in Sweden's roster for the 2026 Winter Olympics. He scored a goal and provided an assist in their opening game against hosts Italy on 11 February at the PalaItalia in Milan. He provided an assist in their final preliminary round match on 14 February against Slovakia. In the qualification playoff on 17 February, he scored a goal and provided an assist against Latvia. In the quarterfinal game on 18 February against the United States, Zibanejad scored a crucial equalizing goal with 91 seconds left in the third period to send the game to overtime, where Sweden eventually lost. He finished the tournament with three goals and three assists in five games.

== Personal life ==
Zibanejad was raised in Huddinge, Sweden. His father, Mehrdad, is from Iran and his mother, Ritva, is from Paltamo, Finland. Mehrdad, a Christian, left Iran in 1983 due to religious persecution following two years of mandatory military service in the Iran–Iraq War. Zibanejad is fluent in English, Persian, Finnish and Swedish.

Zibanejad's maternal half-brother, Monir Kalgoum, is also an ice hockey player who played professionally for teams in several lower-tier European leagues, most notably Huddinge IK and AIK IF in Sweden's HockeyAllsvenskan and Milton Keynes Lightning in the United Kingdom.

Zibanejad got married in 2021 to Irma Helin, a Swedish footballer and sportscaster. They have one child.

=== Music career ===
Zibanejad is also a DJ and music producer. He has released five songs: "Forever" in 2017, "Can't Go Back Home" the following year, in 2018, "Moves," featuring Hot Shade and Mike Perry in 2019, followed by "Nobody," featuring Hot Shade, the same year, and "By My Side" in 2020, which featured Hot Shade and Melina Borglowe. In 2019, Zibanejad performed at the Summerburst Festival in Gothenburg, Sweden, his first music festival.

Zibanejad was one of the musical artists who performed at Lollapalooza Stockholm in 2023. He DJ'd a set, along with fire and pyrotechnics, on the second day (Friday night) of the three-day music festival in Sweden. He joined big-name artists Travis Scott, Lizzo, and Mumford & Sons in the lineup.

== Career statistics ==
=== Regular season and playoffs ===
| | | | Regular season | | | | | Playoffs |
| Season | Team | League | GP | G | A | Pts | PIM | GP | G | A | Pts | PIM |
|---|---|---|---|---|---|---|---|---|---|---|---|---|
| 2008–09 | AIK | J18 | 11 | 2 | 2 | 4 | 2 | — | — | — | — | — |
| 2009–10 | Djurgårdens IF | J18 | 14 | 8 | 12 | 20 | 10 | — | — | — | — | — |
| 2009–10 | Djurgårdens IF | J18 Allsv | 14 | 6 | 9 | 15 | 8 | 5 | 5 | 4 | 9 | 4 |
| 2009–10 | Djurgårdens IF | J20 | 14 | 2 | 2 | 4 | 4 | — | — | — | — | — |
| 2010–11 | Djurgårdens IF | J18 | 2 | 3 | 2 | 5 | 2 | — | — | — | — | — |
| 2010–11 | Djurgårdens IF | J20 | 27 | 12 | 9 | 21 | 12 | 3 | 1 | 2 | 3 | 0 |
| 2010–11 | Djurgårdens IF | SHL | 26 | 5 | 4 | 9 | 2 | 7 | 1 | 1 | 2 | 2 |
| 2011–12 | Djurgårdens IF | SHL | 26 | 5 | 8 | 13 | 4 | — | — | — | — | — |
| 2011–12 | Ottawa Senators | NHL | 9 | 0 | 1 | 1 | 2 | — | — | — | — | — |
| 2012–13 | Binghamton Senators | AHL | 23 | 4 | 7 | 11 | 10 | — | — | — | — | — |
| 2012–13 | Ottawa Senators | NHL | 42 | 7 | 13 | 20 | 6 | 10 | 1 | 3 | 4 | 0 |
| 2013–14 | Binghamton Senators | AHL | 6 | 2 | 5 | 7 | 2 | — | — | — | — | — |
| 2013–14 | Ottawa Senators | NHL | 69 | 16 | 17 | 33 | 18 | — | — | — | — | — |
| 2014–15 | Ottawa Senators | NHL | 80 | 20 | 26 | 46 | 20 | 6 | 1 | 3 | 4 | 0 |
| 2015–16 | Ottawa Senators | NHL | 81 | 21 | 30 | 51 | 18 | — | — | — | — | — |
| 2016–17 | New York Rangers | NHL | 56 | 14 | 23 | 37 | 16 | 12 | 2 | 7 | 9 | 0 |
| 2017–18 | New York Rangers | NHL | 72 | 27 | 20 | 47 | 14 | — | — | — | — | — |
| 2018–19 | New York Rangers | NHL | 82 | 30 | 44 | 74 | 47 | — | — | — | — | — |
| 2019–20 | New York Rangers | NHL | 57 | 41 | 34 | 75 | 14 | 3 | 1 | 1 | 2 | 0 |
| 2020–21 | New York Rangers | NHL | 56 | 24 | 26 | 50 | 18 | — | — | — | — | — |
| 2021–22 | New York Rangers | NHL | 81 | 29 | 52 | 81 | 12 | 20 | 10 | 14 | 24 | 4 |
| 2022–23 | New York Rangers | NHL | 82 | 39 | 52 | 91 | 20 | 7 | 1 | 3 | 4 | 6 |
| 2023–24 | New York Rangers | NHL | 81 | 26 | 46 | 72 | 30 | 16 | 3 | 13 | 16 | 2 |
| 2024–25 | New York Rangers | NHL | 82 | 20 | 42 | 62 | 22 | — | — | — | — | — |
| 2025–26 | New York Rangers | NHL | 81 | 34 | 44 | 78 | 14 | — | — | — | — | — |
| NHL totals | | | 1,011 | 348 | 470 | 818 | 279 | 74 | 19 | 44 | 63 | 12 |

=== International ===
| Year | Team | Event | Result | GP | G | A | Pts | PIM |
|---|---|---|---|---|---|---|---|---|
| 2010 | Sweden | U17 | 3rd place, bronze medalist(s) | 6 | 5 | 4 | 9 | 4 |
| 2011 | Sweden | WJC18 | 2nd place, silver medalist(s) | 6 | 4 | 4 | 8 | 2 |
| 2012 | Sweden | WJC | 1st place, gold medalist(s) | 6 | 4 | 1 | 5 | 2 |
| 2018 | Sweden | WC | 1st place, gold medalist(s) | 10 | 6 | 5 | 11 | 0 |
| 2025 | Sweden | 4NF | 3rd | 2 | 1 | 0 | 1 | 0 |
| 2025 | Sweden | WC | 3rd place, bronze medalist(s) | 9 | 5 | 3 | 8 | 0 |
| 2026 | Sweden | OG | 7th | 5 | 3 | 3 | 6 | 2 |
| Junior totals | | | | 18 | 13 | 9 | 22 | 8 |
| Senior totals | | | | 26 | 15 | 11 | 26 | 2 |

== Awards, honours and records ==
| Award | Year | Ref |
NHL
| NHL All-Star Game | 2022 | |
New York Rangers
| Steven McDonald Extra Effort Award | 2019, 2020 | |

=== Records ===
==== NHL ====
- Most points in a period (6, tied with Bryan Trottier)

==== New York Rangers ====
- Most goals in a game (5, tied with 2 others)

== See also ==
- List of NHL players with 1,000 games played
- Swedish Iranians
- Sweden Finns

Awards and achievements
| Preceded by Jared Cowen | Ottawa Senators first-round draft pick 2011 | Succeeded by Stefan Noesen |
