= 2025 IIHF World Championship rosters =

Each team's roster consisted of at least 15 skaters (forwards and defencemen) and two goaltenders, and at most 22 skaters and three goaltenders. All 16 participating nations, through the confirmation of their respective national associations, had to submit a "Long List" no later than two weeks before the tournament, and a final roster by the Passport Control meeting prior to the start of the tournament.

Age and team as of 9 May 2025. Flags are only for foreign coaches.

== Group A ==
=== Austria ===
A 28-player roster was announced on 28 April 2025. The final squad was revealed on 5 May 2025.

Head coach: (Switzerland) Roger Bader

No.	Pos.	Name	Height	Weight	Birthdate	Team
3	F	Peter Schneider	1.83 m (6 ft 0 in)	91 kg (201 lb)	4 April 1991 (aged 34)	(Austria) Red Bull Salzburg
4	D	Ramon Schnetzer	1.78 m (5 ft 10 in)	83 kg (183 lb)	12 August 1996 (aged 28)	(Austria) Pioneers Vorarlberg
5	F	Thomas Raffl – C	1.94 m (6 ft 4 in)	104 kg (229 lb)	19 June 1986 (aged 38)	(Austria) Red Bull Salzburg
7	F	Brian Lebler	1.91 m (6 ft 3 in)	96 kg (212 lb)	16 July 1988 (aged 36)	(Austria) Black Wings Linz
12	D	David Maier	1.87 m (6 ft 2 in)	83 kg (183 lb)	12 January 2000 (aged 25)	(Austria) EC KAC
16	F	Dominic Zwerger	1.83 m (6 ft 0 in)	93 kg (205 lb)	16 July 1996 (aged 28)	(Switzerland) HC Ambrì-Piotta
18	D	Paul Stapelfeldt	1.95 m (6 ft 5 in)	100 kg (220 lb)	20 September 1998 (aged 26)	(Austria) Red Bull Salzburg
19	F	Vinzenz Rohrer	1.78 m (5 ft 10 in)	73 kg (161 lb)	9 September 2004 (aged 20)	(Switzerland) ZSC Lions
21	F	Lukas Haudum	1.83 m (6 ft 0 in)	86 kg (190 lb)	21 May 1997 (aged 27)	(Austria) Graz 99ers
24	F	Benjamin Baumgartner	1.76 m (5 ft 9 in)	78 kg (172 lb)	22 April 2000 (aged 25)	(Switzerland) SC Bern
26	F	Oliver Achermann	1.95 m (6 ft 5 in)	93 kg (205 lb)	16 January 1994 (aged 31)	(Switzerland) La Chaux-de-Fonds
30	G	David Kickert	1.88 m (6 ft 2 in)	81 kg (179 lb)	16 March 1994 (aged 31)	(Austria) Red Bull Salzburg
31	G	Benedikt Oschgan	1.86 m (6 ft 1 in)	83 kg (183 lb)	4 July 2005 (aged 19)	(Sweden) Växjö Lakers
32	D	Bernd Wolf – A	1.78 m (5 ft 10 in)	84 kg (185 lb)	23 February 1997 (aged 28)	(Switzerland) EHC Kloten
33	G	Florian Vorauer	1.87 m (6 ft 2 in)	79 kg (174 lb)	9 December 1999 (aged 25)	(Austria) EC KAC
35	G	Atte Tolvanen	1.82 m (6 ft 0 in)	84 kg (185 lb)	23 November 1994 (aged 30)	(Austria) Red Bull Salzburg
45	D	Gregor Biber	1.90 m (6 ft 3 in)	89 kg (196 lb)	9 August 2006 (aged 18)	(Sweden) Rögle BK
48	F	Lucas Thaler	1.80 m (5 ft 11 in)	76 kg (168 lb)	21 January 2002 (aged 23)	(Austria) Red Bull Salzburg
52	F	Paul Huber	1.93 m (6 ft 4 in)	101 kg (223 lb)	10 June 2000 (aged 24)	(Austria) Graz 99ers
78	D	Thimo Nickl	1.88 m (6 ft 2 in)	80 kg (180 lb)	4 December 2001 (aged 23)	(Austria) EC KAC
80	F	Nikolaus Kraus	1.82 m (6 ft 0 in)	84 kg (185 lb)	21 November 1996 (aged 28)	(Austria) Red Bull Salzburg
84	F	Luis Lindner	1.82 m (6 ft 0 in)	84 kg (185 lb)	16 May 2001 (aged 23)	(United States) New Hampshire Wildcats
91	D	Dominique Heinrich – A	1.75 m (5 ft 9 in)	76 kg (168 lb)	31 July 1990 (aged 34)	(Austria) Vienna Capitals
92	D	Clemens Unterweger	1.83 m (6 ft 0 in)	85 kg (187 lb)	1 April 1992 (aged 33)	(Austria) EC KAC
95	F	Lukas Kainz	1.84 m (6 ft 0 in)	87 kg (192 lb)	2 September 1995 (aged 29)	(Austria) Graz 99ers
96	F	Marco Kasper	1.86 m (6 ft 1 in)	92 kg (203 lb)	8 April 2004 (aged 21)	(United States) Detroit Red Wings

=== Canada ===
A 15-player roster was announced on 1 May 2025.

Head coach: Dean Evason

No.	Pos.	Name	Height	Weight	Birthdate	Team
6	D	Travis Sanheim	1.93 m (6 ft 4 in)	91 kg (201 lb)	29 March 1996 (aged 29)	(United States) Philadelphia Flyers
7	D	Mike Matheson	1.88 m (6 ft 2 in)	86 kg (190 lb)	27 February 1994 (aged 31)	(Canada) Montreal Canadiens
8	D	Noah Dobson	1.92 m (6 ft 4 in)	84 kg (185 lb)	7 January 2000 (aged 25)	(United States) New York Islanders
9	F	Nathan MacKinnon – A	1.82 m (6 ft 0 in)	85 kg (187 lb)	1 September 1995 (aged 29)	(United States) Colorado Avalanche
10	F	Brayden Schenn	1.85 m (6 ft 1 in)	86 kg (190 lb)	21 August 1991 (aged 33)	(United States) St. Louis Blues
11	F	Travis Konecny	1.79 m (5 ft 10 in)	80 kg (180 lb)	11 March 1997 (aged 28)	(United States) Philadelphia Flyers
14	F	Bo Horvat	1.83 m (6 ft 0 in)	101 kg (223 lb)	5 April 1995 (aged 30)	(United States) New York Islanders
17	F	Will Cuylle	1.91 m (6 ft 3 in)	95 kg (209 lb)	5 February 2002 (aged 23)	(United States) New York Rangers
19	F	Adam Fantilli	1.88 m (6 ft 2 in)	88 kg (194 lb)	12 October 2004 (aged 20)	(United States) Columbus Blue Jackets
24	F	Phillip Danault	1.83 m (6 ft 0 in)	86 kg (190 lb)	24 February 1993 (aged 32)	(United States) Los Angeles Kings
27	F	Barrett Hayton	1.86 m (6 ft 1 in)	87 kg (192 lb)	9 June 2000 (aged 24)	(United States) Utah Mammoth
29	G	Marc-André Fleury	1.85 m (6 ft 1 in)	78 kg (172 lb)	28 November 1984 (aged 40)	(United States) Minnesota Wild
31	G	Dylan Garand	1.85 m (6 ft 1 in)	81 kg (179 lb)	7 June 2002 (aged 22)	(United States) Hartford Wolf Pack
41	D	Ryker Evans	1.83 m (6 ft 0 in)	87 kg (192 lb)	13 December 2001 (aged 23)	(United States) Seattle Kraken
46	D	Jared Spurgeon	1.75 m (5 ft 9 in)	75 kg (165 lb)	29 November 1989 (aged 35)	(United States) Minnesota Wild
50	G	Jordan Binnington	1.89 m (6 ft 2 in)	85 kg (187 lb)	11 July 1993 (aged 31)	(United States) St. Louis Blues
52	D	MacKenzie Weegar	1.83 m (6 ft 0 in)	91 kg (201 lb)	7 January 1994 (aged 31)	(Canada) Calgary Flames
62	D	Brandon Montour	1.83 m (6 ft 0 in)	88 kg (194 lb)	11 April 1994 (aged 31)	(United States) Seattle Kraken
71	F	Tyson Foerster	1.88 m (6 ft 2 in)	93 kg (205 lb)	18 January 2002 (aged 23)	(United States) Philadelphia Flyers
87	F	Sidney Crosby – C	1.80 m (5 ft 11 in)	85 kg (187 lb)	7 August 1987 (aged 37)	(United States) Pittsburgh Penguins
90	F	Ryan O'Reilly – A	1.83 m (6 ft 0 in)	96 kg (212 lb)	7 February 1991 (aged 34)	(United States) Nashville Predators
91	F	Kent Johnson	1.85 m (6 ft 1 in)	76 kg (168 lb)	18 October 2002 (aged 22)	(United States) Columbus Blue Jackets
94	F	Porter Martone	1.91 m (6 ft 3 in)	94 kg (207 lb)	26 October 2006 (aged 18)	(Canada) Brampton Steelheads
96	F	Macklin Celebrini	1.83 m (6 ft 0 in)	86 kg (190 lb)	13 June 2006 (aged 18)	(United States) San Jose Sharks

=== Finland ===
The roster was named on 4 May 2025.

Head coach: Antti Pennanen

No.	Pos.	Name	Height	Weight	Birthdate	Team
2	D	Rasmus Rissanen	1.90 m (6 ft 3 in)	93 kg (205 lb)	13 July 1991 (aged 33)	(Sweden) Linköping HC
4	D	Mikko Lehtonen – C	1.83 m (6 ft 0 in)	89 kg (196 lb)	16 January 1994 (aged 31)	(Switzerland) ZSC Lions
6	D	Tony Sund	1.92 m (6 ft 4 in)	93 kg (205 lb)	4 August 1994 (aged 30)	(Finland) HIFK
13	F	Mikael Ruohomaa	1.84 m (6 ft 0 in)	84 kg (185 lb)	17 November 1988 (aged 36)	(Sweden) Frölunda HC
15	F	Lenni Hämeenaho	1.85 m (6 ft 1 in)	84 kg (185 lb)	7 November 2004 (aged 20)	(Finland) Porin Ässät
18	D	Vili Saarijärvi	1.79 m (5 ft 10 in)	78 kg (172 lb)	15 May 1997 (aged 27)	(Switzerland) SCL Tigers
19	F	Waltteri Merelä	1.90 m (6 ft 3 in)	95 kg (209 lb)	6 July 1998 (aged 26)	(Switzerland) SC Bern
20	F	Eeli Tolvanen	1.79 m (5 ft 10 in)	82 kg (181 lb)	22 April 1999 (aged 26)	(United States) Seattle Kraken
21	F	Patrik Puistola	1.83 m (6 ft 0 in)	82 kg (181 lb)	11 January 2001 (aged 24)	(Sweden) Örebro HK
23	D	Nikolas Matinpalo	1.90 m (6 ft 3 in)	94 kg (207 lb)	5 October 1998 (aged 26)	(Canada) Ottawa Senators
24	F	Hannes Björninen – A	1.85 m (6 ft 1 in)	91 kg (201 lb)	19 October 1995 (aged 29)	(Sweden) Örebro HK
25	F	Joona Ikonen	1.78 m (5 ft 10 in)	74 kg (163 lb)	14 May 1998 (aged 26)	(Sweden) Malmö Redhawks
27	F	Mikael Pyyhtiä	1.72 m (5 ft 8 in)	70 kg (150 lb)	17 December 2001 (aged 23)	(United States) Cleveland Monsters
29	F	Ahti Oksanen	1.92 m (6 ft 4 in)	98 kg (216 lb)	10 March 1993 (aged 32)	(Switzerland) Lausanne HC
31	G	Justus Annunen	1.93 m (6 ft 4 in)	94 kg (207 lb)	11 March 2000 (aged 25)	(United States) Nashville Predators
33	G	Emil Larmi	1.82 m (6 ft 0 in)	84 kg (185 lb)	28 September 1996 (aged 28)	(Sweden) Växjö Lakers
37	D	Atro Leppänen	1.84 m (6 ft 0 in)	83 kg (183 lb)	14 December 1998 (aged 26)	(Finland) Vaasan Sport
41	F	Jan-Mikael Järvinen	1.74 m (5 ft 9 in)	82 kg (181 lb)	26 February 1988 (aged 37)	(Finland) Porin Ässät
42	D	Robin Salo	1.86 m (6 ft 1 in)	85 kg (187 lb)	13 October 1998 (aged 26)	(Sweden) Malmö Redhawks
47	F	Eemil Erholtz	1.81 m (5 ft 11 in)	83 kg (183 lb)	25 March 2000 (aged 25)	(Finland) Porin Ässät
50	D	Mikael Seppälä	1.87 m (6 ft 2 in)	96 kg (212 lb)	8 March 1994 (aged 31)	(Sweden) HV71
61	F	Juuso Pärssinen	1.91 m (6 ft 3 in)	95 kg (209 lb)	1 February 2001 (aged 24)	(United States) New York Rangers
62	D	Jesper Mattila	1.80 m (5 ft 11 in)	80 kg (180 lb)	9 October 1997 (aged 27)	(Finland) KalPa
74	G	Juuse Saros	1.79 m (5 ft 10 in)	82 kg (181 lb)	19 April 1995 (aged 30)	(United States) Nashville Predators
82	F	Harri Pesonen	1.82 m (6 ft 0 in)	88 kg (194 lb)	6 August 1988 (aged 36)	(Switzerland) SCL Tigers
86	F	Teuvo Teräväinen – A	1.80 m (5 ft 11 in)	81 kg (179 lb)	11 September 1994 (aged 30)	(United States) Chicago Blackhawks
91	F	Juho Lammikko	1.90 m (6 ft 3 in)	91 kg (201 lb)	29 January 1996 (aged 29)	(Switzerland) ZSC Lions

=== France ===
The roster was announced on 6 May 2025.

Head coach: Yorick Treille

No.	Pos.	Name	Height	Weight	Birthdate	Team
3	F	Charles Bertrand	1.85 m (6 ft 1 in)	91 kg (201 lb)	5 February 1991 (aged 34)	(Germany) ERC Ingolstadt
5	D	Enzo Guebey	1.83 m (6 ft 0 in)	89 kg (196 lb)	6 May 1999 (aged 26)	(Switzerland) HC Davos
6	D	Vincent Llorca	1.93 m (6 ft 4 in)	92 kg (203 lb)	16 January 1992 (aged 33)	(France) Ducs d'Angers
7	D	Pierre Crinon	1.95 m (6 ft 5 in)	102 kg (225 lb)	2 August 1995 (aged 29)	(France) Brûleurs de Loups
8	D	Hugo Gallet – A	1.92 m (6 ft 4 in)	93 kg (205 lb)	20 June 1997 (aged 27)	(Finland) Iisalmen Peli-Karhut
9	F	Alexandre Texier	1.85 m (6 ft 1 in)	88 kg (194 lb)	13 September 1999 (aged 25)	(United States) St. Louis Blues
20	F	Fabien Colotti	1.79 m (5 ft 10 in)	79 kg (174 lb)	27 August 1996 (aged 28)	(France) Spartiates de Marseille
22	F	Guillaume Leclerc	1.73 m (5 ft 8 in)	79 kg (174 lb)	20 February 1996 (aged 29)	(France) Brûleurs de Loups
25	F	Nicolas Ritz	1.80 m (5 ft 11 in)	88 kg (194 lb)	26 February 1992 (aged 33)	(Denmark) Herning Blue Fox
27	D	Jules Boscq	1.83 m (6 ft 0 in)	81 kg (179 lb)	22 February 2002 (aged 23)	(United States) Iowa Heartlanders
28	D	Fabien Bourgeois	1.73 m (5 ft 8 in)	78 kg (172 lb)	6 April 1995 (aged 30)	(France) Spartiates de Marseille
29	F	Louis Boudon – A	1.80 m (5 ft 11 in)	85 kg (187 lb)	4 October 1998 (aged 26)	(Sweden) Nybro Vikings IF
30	G	Antoine Keller	1.88 m (6 ft 2 in)	74 kg (163 lb)	6 October 2004 (aged 20)	(Switzerland) Lausanne HC
32	G	Quentin Papillon	1.77 m (5 ft 10 in)	81 kg (179 lb)	7 April 1997 (aged 28)	(France) Boxers de Bordeaux
33	G	Julian Junca	1.95 m (6 ft 5 in)	97 kg (214 lb)	15 February 1998 (aged 27)	(Slovakia) Dukla Michalovce
41	F	Pierre-Édouard Bellemare – C	1.82 m (6 ft 0 in)	89 kg (196 lb)	6 March 1985 (aged 40)	(Switzerland) HC Ajoie
44	D	Kevin Spinozzi	1.88 m (6 ft 2 in)	97 kg (214 lb)	23 May 1996 (aged 28)	(France) Boxers de Bordeaux
70	F	Baptiste Bruche	1.83 m (6 ft 0 in)	95 kg (209 lb)	27 January 2000 (aged 25)	(France) Boxers de Bordeaux
72	F	Jordann Perret	1.79 m (5 ft 10 in)	80 kg (180 lb)	15 October 1994 (aged 30)	(Czech Republic) Mountfield HK
77	F	Sacha Treille	1.94 m (6 ft 4 in)	97 kg (214 lb)	6 November 1987 (aged 37)	(France) Brûleurs de Loups
78	F	Dylan Fabre	1.78 m (5 ft 10 in)	80 kg (180 lb)	10 November 2000 (aged 24)	(Finland) Porin Ässät
81	F	Anthony Rech	1.80 m (5 ft 11 in)	86 kg (190 lb)	9 July 1992 (aged 32)	(France) Dragons de Rouen
86	D	Yohan Coulaud	1.80 m (5 ft 11 in)	83 kg (183 lb)	30 August 2000 (aged 24)	(France) Spartiates de Marseille
90	F	Aurelien Dair	1.87 m (6 ft 2 in)	84 kg (185 lb)	10 September 1999 (aged 25)	(France) Brûleurs de Loups
94	F	Tim Bozon	1.86 m (6 ft 1 in)	93 kg (205 lb)	24 March 1994 (aged 31)	(Switzerland) Lausanne HC
95	F	Kévin Bozon	1.87 m (6 ft 2 in)	93 kg (205 lb)	30 December 1995 (aged 29)	(Switzerland) HC Ajoie

=== Latvia ===
The roster was announced on 6 May 2025.

Head coach: Harijs Vītoliņš

No.	Pos.	Name	Height	Weight	Birthdate	Team
6	D	Markuss Komuls	1.80 m (5 ft 11 in)	84 kg (185 lb)	4 January 1998 (aged 27)	(Czech Republic) Rytíři Kladno
11	F	Dans Ločmelis	1.85 m (6 ft 1 in)	81 kg (179 lb)	21 January 2004 (aged 21)	(United States) Providence Bruins
12	F	Gļebs Prohorenkovs	1.86 m (6 ft 1 in)	80 kg (180 lb)	12 November 2001 (aged 23)	(United States) Niagara Purple Eagles
13	F	Rihards Bukarts	1.80 m (5 ft 11 in)	84 kg (185 lb)	31 December 1995 (aged 29)	(Czech Republic) Vítkovice Ridera
16	F	Kaspars Daugaviņš – C	1.83 m (6 ft 0 in)	101 kg (223 lb)	18 May 1988 (aged 36)	(Slovakia) HK Dukla Michalovce
17	F	Mārtiņš Dzierkals	1.83 m (6 ft 0 in)	84 kg (185 lb)	4 April 1997 (aged 28)	(Sweden) Skellefteå AIK
18	F	Rodrigo Ābols	1.93 m (6 ft 4 in)	93 kg (205 lb)	5 January 1996 (aged 29)	(United States) Lehigh Valley Phantoms
21	F	Rūdolfs Balcers	1.80 m (5 ft 11 in)	79 kg (174 lb)	8 April 1997 (aged 28)	(Switzerland) ZSC Lions
22	F	Toms Andersons	1.85 m (6 ft 1 in)	86 kg (190 lb)	25 November 1993 (aged 31)	(Switzerland) HC La Chaux-de-Fonds
27	D	Oskars Cibuļskis	1.88 m (6 ft 2 in)	96 kg (212 lb)	9 April 1988 (aged 37)	(Denmark) Herning Blue Fox
29	D	Ralfs Freibergs	1.81 m (5 ft 11 in)	84 kg (185 lb)	17 May 1991 (aged 33)	(Czech Republic) Mountfield HK
34	F	Eduards Tralmaks	1.91 m (6 ft 3 in)	85 kg (187 lb)	17 February 1997 (aged 28)	(Czech Republic) Rytíři Kladno
36	F	Mārtiņš Laviņš	1.86 m (6 ft 1 in)	84 kg (185 lb)	15 January 2003 (aged 22)	(United States) New Hampshire Wildcats
40	G	Mareks Mitens	1.85 m (6 ft 1 in)	80 kg (180 lb)	29 January 1998 (aged 27)	(Slovakia) Spišská Nová Ves
42	D	Miks Tumānovs	1.95 m (6 ft 5 in)	83 kg (183 lb)	7 August 2001 (aged 23)	(Finland) JYP Jyväskylä
43	F	Anrī Ravinskis	1.87 m (6 ft 2 in)	86 kg (190 lb)	2 January 2003 (aged 22)	(Finland) HPK
50	G	Kristers Gudļevskis	1.92 m (6 ft 4 in)	97 kg (214 lb)	31 July 1992 (aged 32)	(Germany) Fischtown Pinguins
55	D	Roberts Mamčics	1.96 m (6 ft 5 in)	105 kg (231 lb)	6 April 1995 (aged 30)	(Czech Republic) Energie Karlovy Vary
72	D	Jānis Jaks	1.83 m (6 ft 0 in)	86 kg (190 lb)	22 August 1995 (aged 29)	(Czech Republic) Energie Karlovy Vary
77	D	Kristaps Zīle – A	1.85 m (6 ft 1 in)	86 kg (190 lb)	24 December 1997 (aged 27)	(Czech Republic) HC Litvínov
88	G	Gustavs Grigals	1.88 m (6 ft 2 in)	89 kg (196 lb)	22 July 1998 (aged 26)	(Slovakia) Dukla Trenčín
89	F	Filips Buncis	1.90 m (6 ft 3 in)	93 kg (205 lb)	12 June 1997 (aged 27)	(Denmark) Odense Bulldogs
94	D	Kristiāns Rubīns – A	1.94 m (6 ft 4 in)	96 kg (212 lb)	11 December 1997 (aged 27)	(Czech Republic) Škoda Plzeň
95	F	Oskars Batņa	1.95 m (6 ft 5 in)	106 kg (234 lb)	7 May 1995 (aged 30)	(Czech Republic) Mountfield HK
97	F	Haralds Egle	1.80 m (5 ft 11 in)	95 kg (209 lb)	11 May 1996 (aged 28)	(Slovakia) HK 32 Liptovský Mikuláš

=== Slovakia ===
The roster was announced on 7 May 2025.

Head coach: Vladimír Országh

No.	Pos.	Name	Height	Weight	Birthdate	Team
4	D	Dávid Mudrák	1.85 m (6 ft 1 in)	90 kg (200 lb)	13 February 2001 (aged 24)	(Czech Republic) Mountfield HK
6	D	Dávid Romaňák	1.90 m (6 ft 3 in)	95 kg (209 lb)	12 August 1999 (aged 25)	(Slovakia) HK Spišská Nová Ves
7	D	Mário Grman	1.86 m (6 ft 1 in)	89 kg (196 lb)	11 April 1997 (aged 28)	(Russia) Admiral Vladivostok
8	F	Maxim Čajkovič	1.82 m (6 ft 0 in)	91 kg (201 lb)	3 January 2001 (aged 24)	(Czech Republic) HC Litvínov
10	F	Adam Sýkora	1.80 m (5 ft 11 in)	87 kg (192 lb)	7 September 2004 (aged 20)	(United States) Hartford Wolf Pack
13	F	Michal Krištof	1.75 m (5 ft 9 in)	74 kg (163 lb)	11 October 1993 (aged 31)	(Switzerland) SCL Tigers
15	F	Dalibor Dvorský	1.85 m (6 ft 1 in)	92 kg (203 lb)	15 June 2005 (aged 19)	(United States) Springfield Thunderbirds
16	F	Róbert Lantoši	1.80 m (5 ft 11 in)	84 kg (185 lb)	24 September 1995 (aged 29)	(Czech Republic) Bílí Tygři Liberec
17	F	Matej Kašlík	1.83 m (6 ft 0 in)	81 kg (179 lb)	5 August 2002 (aged 22)	(Czech Republic) Motor České Budějovice
19	F	Patrik Hrehorčák	1.75 m (5 ft 9 in)	82 kg (181 lb)	18 March 1999 (aged 26)	(Czech Republic) HC Oceláři Třinec
22	D	Samuel Kňažko	1.86 m (6 ft 1 in)	86 kg (190 lb)	7 August 2002 (aged 22)	(United States) Cleveland Monsters
24	G	Patrik Rybár	1.90 m (6 ft 3 in)	91 kg (201 lb)	9 November 1993 (aged 31)	(China) Kunlun Red Star
27	F	Sebastián Čederle	1.85 m (6 ft 1 in)	93 kg (205 lb)	21 February 2000 (aged 25)	(Slovakia) HK Nitra
29	D	Michal Ivan – A	1.85 m (6 ft 1 in)	90 kg (200 lb)	18 November 1999 (aged 25)	(Czech Republic) Bílí Tygři Liberec
31	G	Samuel Hlavaj	1.93 m (6 ft 4 in)	99 kg (218 lb)	29 May 2001 (aged 23)	(United States) Iowa Wild
32	G	Adam Húska	1.94 m (6 ft 4 in)	96 kg (212 lb)	12 May 1997 (aged 27)	(Switzerland) HC Lugano
40	F	Miloš Roman – A	1.82 m (6 ft 0 in)	85 kg (187 lb)	6 November 1999 (aged 25)	(Czech Republic) Oceláři Třinec
42	F	Samuel Honzek	1.93 m (6 ft 4 in)	88 kg (194 lb)	12 November 2004 (aged 20)	(Canada) Calgary Flames
44	D	Mislav Rosandić	1.81 m (5 ft 11 in)	90 kg (200 lb)	26 January 1995 (aged 30)	(Slovakia) HC Košice
49	F	Samuel Takáč	1.84 m (6 ft 0 in)	92 kg (203 lb)	3 December 1993 (aged 31)	(Slovakia) Slovan Bratislava
64	D	Patrik Koch	1.86 m (6 ft 1 in)	86 kg (190 lb)	8 December 1996 (aged 28)	(Czech Republic) Oceláři Třinec
73	D	Michal Beňo	1.88 m (6 ft 2 in)	86 kg (190 lb)	15 November 2001 (aged 23)	(Slovakia) HKM Zvolen
87	F	Pavol Regenda	1.93 m (6 ft 4 in)	96 kg (212 lb)	7 December 1999 (aged 25)	(United States) San Jose Barracuda
88	F	Martin Chromiak	1.83 m (6 ft 0 in)	91 kg (201 lb)	20 August 2002 (aged 22)	(United States) Ontario Reign
91	F	Matúš Sukeľ – C	1.76 m (5 ft 9 in)	78 kg (172 lb)	23 January 1996 (aged 29)	(Czech Republic) Verva Litvínov
98	D	Andrej Golian	1.92 m (6 ft 4 in)	86 kg (190 lb)	7 March 2001 (aged 24)	(Slovakia) Slovan Bratislava

=== Slovenia ===
The roster was announced on 6 May 2025.

Head coach: Edo Terglav

No.	Pos.	Name	Height	Weight	Birthdate	Team
4	D	Aleksandar Magovac	1.81 m (5 ft 11 in)	91 kg (201 lb)	9 February 1991 (aged 34)	(France) Gothiques d'Amiens
6	D	Miha Štebih	1.90 m (6 ft 3 in)	92 kg (203 lb)	7 April 1992 (aged 33)	(Czech Republic) Horacka Slavia Trebic
8	F	Marcel Mahkovec	1.80 m (5 ft 11 in)	84 kg (185 lb)	17 December 2003 (aged 21)	(Slovenia) HK Olimpija
10	F	Miha Beričič	1.93 m (6 ft 4 in)	88 kg (194 lb)	15 April 2004 (aged 21)	(Slovenia) HK Olimpija
12	F	Nik Simšič	1.80 m (5 ft 11 in)	86 kg (190 lb)	12 March 1997 (aged 28)	(Slovenia) HK Olimpija
13	F	Nace Langus	1.86 m (6 ft 1 in)	87 kg (192 lb)	5 December 2004 (aged 20)	(United States) Augustana Vikings
14	D	Matic Podlipnik – A	1.81 m (5 ft 11 in)	82 kg (181 lb)	9 August 1992 (aged 32)	(Austria) Kitzbüheler EC
15	D	Blaž Gregorc	1.90 m (6 ft 3 in)	95 kg (209 lb)	18 January 1990 (aged 35)	(Slovenia) HK Olimpija
17	D	Jan Goličič	1.96 m (6 ft 5 in)	93 kg (205 lb)	30 June 2006 (aged 18)	(Canada) Gatineau Olympiques
18	F	Ken Ograjenšek	1.75 m (5 ft 9 in)	81 kg (179 lb)	30 August 1991 (aged 33)	(Austria) Black Wings Linz
21	F	Jan Drozg	1.85 m (6 ft 1 in)	85 kg (187 lb)	1 April 1999 (aged 26)	(China) Kunlun Red Star
23	F	Jaka Sodja	1.76 m (5 ft 9 in)	85 kg (187 lb)	17 December 1999 (aged 25)	(Slovenia) HK Olimpija
33	G	Žan Us	1.80 m (5 ft 11 in)	80 kg (180 lb)	10 June 1996 (aged 28)	(Slovenia) HDD Jesenice
41	D	Jan Ćosić	1.78 m (5 ft 10 in)	80 kg (180 lb)	7 March 2003 (aged 22)	(Slovenia) HK Olimpija
43	D	Urban Podrekar	1.83 m (6 ft 0 in)	86 kg (190 lb)	14 February 2005 (aged 20)	(United States) Flint Firebirds
46	F	Matic Török – A	1.80 m (5 ft 11 in)	86 kg (190 lb)	26 July 2003 (aged 21)	(Finland) Kookoo
47	F	Rok Macuh	1.90 m (6 ft 3 in)	100 kg (220 lb)	19 April 1997 (aged 28)	(Czech Republic) HC Olomouc
49	F	Filip Sitar	1.80 m (5 ft 11 in)	85 kg (187 lb)	29 June 2005 (aged 19)	(United States) Connecticut Huskies
55	F	Robert Sabolič – C	1.83 m (6 ft 0 in)	91 kg (201 lb)	18 September 1988 (aged 36)	(Slovenia) HK Olimpija
61	G	Lukaš Horak	1.86 m (6 ft 1 in)	86 kg (190 lb)	5 October 1993 (aged 31)	(Slovenia) HK Olimpija
69	G	Matija Pintarič	1.82 m (6 ft 0 in)	84 kg (185 lb)	11 August 1989 (aged 35)	(France) Brûleurs de Loups
70	F	Rok Kapel	1.78 m (5 ft 10 in)	81 kg (179 lb)	4 May 1999 (aged 26)	(Slovenia) HK Olimpija
91	F	Žan Jezovšek	1.85 m (6 ft 1 in)	98 kg (216 lb)	22 April 1997 (aged 28)	(Germany) EV Lindau Islanders
92	F	Anže Žeželj	1.73 m (5 ft 8 in)	80 kg (180 lb)	24 March 2005 (aged 20)	(Hungary) Fehérvár HA
96	D	Bine Mašič	1.78 m (5 ft 10 in)	75 kg (165 lb)	14 November 2002 (aged 22)	(Slovenia) HK Olimpija

=== Sweden ===
The roster was announced on 2 May 2025.

Head coach: Sam Hallam

No.	Pos.	Name	Height	Weight	Birthdate	Team
4	D	Rasmus Andersson – C	1.85 m (6 ft 1 in)	92 kg (203 lb)	27 October 1996 (aged 28)	(Canada) Calgary Flames
6	D	Adam Larsson	1.90 m (6 ft 3 in)	95 kg (209 lb)	12 November 1992 (aged 32)	(United States) Seattle Kraken
8	D	Jonas Brodin	1.85 m (6 ft 1 in)	88 kg (194 lb)	12 July 1993 (aged 31)	(United States) Minnesota Wild
9	F	Filip Forsberg	1.85 m (6 ft 1 in)	93 kg (205 lb)	13 August 1994 (aged 30)	(United States) Nashville Predators
10	F	Alexander Wennberg	1.88 m (6 ft 2 in)	85 kg (187 lb)	22 September 1994 (aged 30)	(United States) San Jose Sharks
11	F	Mikael Backlund – A	1.83 m (6 ft 0 in)	94 kg (207 lb)	17 March 1989 (aged 36)	(Canada) Calgary Flames
12	F	Max Friberg	1.80 m (5 ft 11 in)	86 kg (190 lb)	20 November 1992 (aged 32)	(Sweden) Frölunda HC
23	F	Lucas Raymond	1.83 m (6 ft 0 in)	85 kg (187 lb)	28 March 2002 (aged 23)	(United States) Detroit Red Wings
25	G	Jacob Markström	1.96 m (6 ft 5 in)	93 kg (205 lb)	31 January 1990 (aged 35)	(United States) New Jersey Devils
26	F	Anton Bengtsson	1.86 m (6 ft 1 in)	88 kg (194 lb)	13 May 1993 (aged 31)	(Sweden) Rögle BK
28	F	Elias Lindholm	1.83 m (6 ft 0 in)	92 kg (203 lb)	2 December 1994 (aged 30)	(United States) Boston Bruins
29	D	Marcus Pettersson	1.94 m (6 ft 4 in)	80 kg (180 lb)	8 May 1996 (aged 29)	(Canada) Vancouver Canucks
33	G	Samuel Ersson	1.90 m (6 ft 3 in)	92 kg (203 lb)	20 October 1999 (aged 25)	(United States) Philadelphia Flyers
37	F	Isac Lundeström	1.83 m (6 ft 0 in)	85 kg (187 lb)	6 November 1999 (aged 25)	(United States) Anaheim Ducks
38	D	Rasmus Sandin	1.80 m (5 ft 11 in)	85 kg (187 lb)	7 March 2000 (aged 25)	(United States) Washington Capitals
40	G	Arvid Söderblom	1.93 m (6 ft 4 in)	94 kg (207 lb)	19 August 1999 (aged 25)	(United States) Chicago Blackhawks
51	F	Emil Heineman	1.87 m (6 ft 2 in)	92 kg (203 lb)	16 November 2001 (aged 23)	(Canada) Montreal Canadiens
56	D	Erik Gustafsson	1.86 m (6 ft 1 in)	87 kg (192 lb)	14 March 1992 (aged 33)	(United States) Detroit Red Wings
71	F	William Karlsson	1.85 m (6 ft 1 in)	86 kg (190 lb)	8 January 1993 (aged 32)	(United States) Vegas Golden Knights
77	D	Simon Edvinsson	1.99 m (6 ft 6 in)	100 kg (220 lb)	5 February 2003 (aged 22)	(United States) Detroit Red Wings
82	F	Jesper Frödén	1.79 m (5 ft 10 in)	80 kg (180 lb)	21 September 1994 (aged 30)	(Switzerland) ZSC Lions
88	F	William Nylander	1.83 m (6 ft 0 in)	86 kg (190 lb)	1 May 1996 (aged 29)	(Canada) Toronto Maple Leafs
90	F	Marcus Johansson	1.85 m (6 ft 1 in)	90 kg (200 lb)	6 October 1990 (aged 34)	(United States) Minnesota Wild
91	F	Leo Carlsson	1.91 m (6 ft 3 in)	92 kg (203 lb)	26 December 2004 (aged 20)	(United States) Anaheim Ducks
93	F	Mika Zibanejad – A	1.88 m (6 ft 2 in)	92 kg (203 lb)	18 April 1993 (aged 32)	(United States) New York Rangers

== Group B ==
=== Czechia ===
A 24-player roster was announced on 4 May 2025.

Head coach: Radim Rulík

No.	Pos.	Name	Height	Weight	Birthdate	Team
7	D	David Špaček	1.83 m (6 ft 0 in)	86 kg (190 lb)	18 February 2003 (aged 22)	(United States) Iowa Wild
8	F	Ondřej Beránek	1.84 m (6 ft 0 in)	90 kg (200 lb)	21 December 1995 (aged 29)	(Czech Republic) Karlovy Vary
10	F	Roman Červenka – C	1.82 m (6 ft 0 in)	89 kg (196 lb)	10 December 1985 (aged 39)	(Czech Republic) Dynamo Pardubice
17	D	Filip Hronek – A	1.83 m (6 ft 0 in)	85 kg (187 lb)	2 November 1997 (aged 27)	(Canada) Vancouver Canucks
18	F	Filip Zadina	1.84 m (6 ft 0 in)	86 kg (190 lb)	27 November 1999 (aged 25)	(Switzerland) HC Davos
19	F	Jakub Flek	1.73 m (5 ft 8 in)	76 kg (168 lb)	24 December 1992 (aged 32)	(Czech Republic) Kometa Brno
20	D	Daniel Gazda	1.86 m (6 ft 1 in)	94 kg (207 lb)	13 August 1997 (aged 27)	(Finland) Ilves
22	F	Jáchym Kondelík	2.01 m (6 ft 7 in)	107 kg (236 lb)	21 December 1999 (aged 25)	(Czech Republic) Dynamo Pardubice
23	F	Lukáš Sedlák	1.84 m (6 ft 0 in)	96 kg (212 lb)	25 February 1993 (aged 32)	(Czech Republic) Dynamo Pardubice
24	F	Adam Klapka	2.03 m (6 ft 8 in)	107 kg (236 lb)	14 September 2000 (aged 24)	(Canada) Calgary Flames
26	D	Jiří Ticháček	1.75 m (5 ft 9 in)	77 kg (170 lb)	30 January 2003 (aged 22)	(Czech Republic) Rytíři Kladno
32	G	Josef Kořenář	1.86 m (6 ft 1 in)	78 kg (172 lb)	31 January 1998 (aged 27)	(Czech Republic) Sparta Praha
36	D	Jakub Krejčík	1.87 m (6 ft 2 in)	87 kg (192 lb)	25 June 1991 (aged 33)	(Czech Republic) Sparta Praha
43	F	Michael Špaček	1.80 m (5 ft 11 in)	85 kg (187 lb)	9 April 1997 (aged 28)	(Czech Republic) Sparta Praha
44	F	Matěj Stránský	1.93 m (6 ft 4 in)	98 kg (216 lb)	11 July 1993 (aged 31)	(Switzerland) HC Davos
50	G	Karel Vejmelka	1.90 m (6 ft 3 in)	90 kg (200 lb)	25 May 1996 (aged 28)	(United States) Utah Mammoth
55	D	Libor Hájek	1.91 m (6 ft 3 in)	95 kg (209 lb)	4 February 1998 (aged 27)	(Czech Republic) Dynamo Pardubice
64	F	David Kämpf	1.88 m (6 ft 2 in)	86 kg (190 lb)	12 January 1995 (aged 30)	(Canada) Toronto Maple Leafs
77	D	Filip Pyrochta	1.83 m (6 ft 0 in)	80 kg (180 lb)	24 June 1996 (aged 28)	(Czech Republic) Mladá Boleslav
80	G	Daniel Vladař	1.96 m (6 ft 5 in)	85 kg (187 lb)	20 August 1997 (aged 27)	(Canada) Calgary Flames
84	D	Tomáš Kundrátek	1.88 m (6 ft 2 in)	94 kg (207 lb)	26 December 1989 (aged 35)	(Czech Republic) Oceláři Třinec
86	F	Petr Kodýtek	1.67 m (5 ft 6 in)	67 kg (148 lb)	17 August 1998 (aged 26)	(Finland) HIFK
88	F	David Pastrňák – A	1.82 m (6 ft 0 in)	82 kg (181 lb)	25 May 1996 (aged 28)	(United States) Boston Bruins
94	F	Jakub Lauko	1.83 m (6 ft 0 in)	77 kg (170 lb)	28 March 2000 (aged 25)	(United States) Boston Bruins
96	F	Daniel Voženílek	1.90 m (6 ft 3 in)	97 kg (214 lb)	10 February 1996 (aged 29)	(Switzerland) EV Zug
98	F	Martin Nečas	1.88 m (6 ft 2 in)	90 kg (200 lb)	15 January 1999 (aged 26)	(United States) Colorado Avalanche

=== Denmark ===
The roster was announced on 7 May 2025.

Head coach: (Sweden) Mikael Gath

No.	Pos.	Name	Height	Weight	Birthdate	Team
11	F	Alexander True	1.96 m (6 ft 5 in)	91 kg (201 lb)	17 July 1997 (aged 27)	(Sweden) MoDo Hockey
12	F	Oscar Fisker Mølgaard	1.83 m (6 ft 0 in)	76 kg (168 lb)	18 February 2005 (aged 20)	(Sweden) HV71
15	D	Matias Lassen	1.82 m (6 ft 0 in)	82 kg (181 lb)	15 March 1996 (aged 29)	(Sweden) Malmö Redhawks
17	F	Nicklas Jensen	1.91 m (6 ft 3 in)	98 kg (216 lb)	6 March 1993 (aged 32)	(Switzerland) SC Rapperswil-Jona Lakers
22	D	Markus Lauridsen	1.86 m (6 ft 1 in)	87 kg (192 lb)	28 February 1991 (aged 34)	(Germany) Löwen Frankfurt
24	F	Nikolaj Ehlers	1.85 m (6 ft 1 in)	82 kg (181 lb)	14 February 1996 (aged 29)	(Canada) Winnipeg Jets
25	D	Oliver Lauridsen – A	1.97 m (6 ft 6 in)	93 kg (205 lb)	24 March 1989 (aged 36)	(Finland) HC TPS
29	F	Mikkel Aagaard	1.84 m (6 ft 0 in)	81 kg (179 lb)	18 October 1995 (aged 29)	(Sweden) MoDo Hockey
32	G	Sebastian Dahm	1.82 m (6 ft 0 in)	83 kg (183 lb)	28 February 1987 (aged 38)	(Austria) EC KAC
38	F	Morten Poulsen	1.86 m (6 ft 1 in)	95 kg (209 lb)	9 September 1988 (aged 36)	(Denmark) Herning Blue Fox
40	D	Anders Koch	1.88 m (6 ft 2 in)	83 kg (183 lb)	2 October 1997 (aged 27)	(Finland) Kiekko-Espoo
41	D	Jesper Jensen Aabo – C	1.83 m (6 ft 0 in)	93 kg (205 lb)	30 July 1991 (aged 33)	(Austria) EC KAC
42	D	Phillip Bruggisser	1.83 m (6 ft 0 in)	85 kg (187 lb)	7 August 1991 (aged 33)	(Germany) Fischtown Pinguins
43	G	Mathias Seldrup	1.80 m (5 ft 11 in)	82 kg (181 lb)	21 October 1996 (aged 28)	(Denmark) Herning Blue Fox
46	F	Jonas Røndbjerg	1.88 m (6 ft 2 in)	88 kg (194 lb)	31 March 1999 (aged 26)	(United States) Vegas Golden Knights
48	D	Nicholas B. Jensen	1.89 m (6 ft 2 in)	102 kg (225 lb)	8 April 1989 (aged 36)	(Germany) Fischtown Pinguins
50	F	Mathias Bau Hansen	2.00 m (6 ft 7 in)	108 kg (238 lb)	3 July 1993 (aged 31)	(Denmark) Herning Blue Fox
54	F	Felix Scheel	1.83 m (6 ft 0 in)	89 kg (196 lb)	1 September 1992 (aged 32)	(Germany) Fischtown Pinguins
63	F	Patrick Russell – A	1.86 m (6 ft 1 in)	92 kg (203 lb)	4 January 1993 (aged 32)	(Sweden) Linköping HC
65	F	Christian Wejse	1.86 m (6 ft 1 in)	88 kg (194 lb)	4 December 1998 (aged 26)	(Germany) Fischtown Pinguins
72	F	Nicolai Meyer	1.79 m (5 ft 10 in)	82 kg (181 lb)	21 July 1993 (aged 31)	(Sweden) Södertälje SK
77	F	Mathias From	1.86 m (6 ft 1 in)	85 kg (187 lb)	16 December 1997 (aged 27)	(Austria) EC KAC
80	G	Frederik Dichow	1.95 m (6 ft 5 in)	87 kg (192 lb)	1 March 2001 (aged 24)	(Sweden) HV71
86	F	Joachim Blichfeld	1.87 m (6 ft 2 in)	82 kg (181 lb)	17 July 1998 (aged 26)	(Sweden) Rögle BK
95	F	Nick Olesen	1.85 m (6 ft 1 in)	84 kg (185 lb)	14 November 1995 (aged 29)	(Czech Republic) Motor České Budějovice

=== Germany ===
A 26-player roster was announced on 30 April 2025.

Head coach: Harold Kreis

No.	Pos.	Name	Height	Weight	Birthdate	Team
7	F	Maximilian Kastner	1.80 m (5 ft 11 in)	84 kg (185 lb)	3 January 1993 (aged 32)	(Germany) EHC Red Bull München
11	D	Korbinian Geibel	1.84 m (6 ft 0 in)	91 kg (201 lb)	8 July 2002 (aged 22)	(Germany) Eisbären Berlin
12	D	Eric Mik	1.82 m (6 ft 0 in)	83 kg (183 lb)	28 February 2000 (aged 25)	(Germany) Eisbären Berlin
18	F	Tim Stützle	1.84 m (6 ft 0 in)	87 kg (192 lb)	15 January 2002 (aged 23)	(Canada) Ottawa Senators
19	F	Wojciech Stachowiak – A	1.85 m (6 ft 1 in)	85 kg (187 lb)	3 July 1999 (aged 25)	(Germany) ERC Ingolstadt
25	D	Leon Hüttl	1.82 m (6 ft 0 in)	80 kg (180 lb)	21 September 2000 (aged 24)	(Germany) ERC Ingolstadt
30	G	Philipp Grubauer	1.85 m (6 ft 1 in)	84 kg (185 lb)	25 November 1991 (aged 33)	(United States) Seattle Kraken
31	G	Arno Tiefensee	1.93 m (6 ft 4 in)	87 kg (192 lb)	1 May 2002 (aged 23)	(Germany) Adler Mannheim
35	G	Mathias Niederberger	1.80 m (5 ft 11 in)	80 kg (180 lb)	26 November 1992 (aged 32)	(Germany) EHC Red Bull München
38	D	Fabio Wagner	1.82 m (6 ft 0 in)	83 kg (183 lb)	17 September 1995 (aged 29)	(Germany) ERC Ingolstadt
40	F	Alexander Ehl	1.75 m (5 ft 9 in)	76 kg (168 lb)	28 November 1999 (aged 25)	(Germany) Adler Mannheim
41	D	Jonas Müller – A	1.83 m (6 ft 0 in)	88 kg (194 lb)	19 November 1995 (aged 29)	(Germany) Eisbären Berlin
42	F	Yasin Ehliz	1.77 m (5 ft 10 in)	84 kg (185 lb)	30 December 1992 (aged 32)	(Germany) EHC Red Bull München
44	F	Joshua Samanski	1.90 m (6 ft 3 in)	91 kg (201 lb)	22 March 2002 (aged 23)	(Germany) Straubing Tigers
49	D	Lukas Kälble	1.88 m (6 ft 2 in)	93 kg (205 lb)	13 October 1997 (aged 27)	(Germany) Adler Mannheim
50	F	Patrick Hager	1.78 m (5 ft 10 in)	80 kg (180 lb)	8 September 1988 (aged 36)	(Germany) EHC Red Bull München
53	D	Moritz Seider – C	1.92 m (6 ft 4 in)	90 kg (200 lb)	6 April 2001 (aged 24)	(United States) Detroit Red Wings
55	D	Maksymilian Szuber	1.91 m (6 ft 3 in)	92 kg (203 lb)	25 August 2002 (aged 22)	(United States) Tucson Roadrunners
56	F	Manuel Wiederer	1.83 m (6 ft 0 in)	82 kg (181 lb)	21 November 1996 (aged 28)	(Germany) Eisbären Berlin
65	F	Marc Michaelis	1.77 m (5 ft 10 in)	79 kg (174 lb)	31 July 1995 (aged 29)	(Germany) Adler Mannheim
72	F	Dominik Kahun	1.80 m (5 ft 11 in)	79 kg (174 lb)	2 July 1995 (aged 29)	(Switzerland) Lausanne HC
73	F	Lukas Reichel	1.83 m (6 ft 0 in)	78 kg (172 lb)	17 May 2002 (aged 22)	(United States) Chicago Blackhawks
74	F	Justin Schütz	1.81 m (5 ft 11 in)	82 kg (181 lb)	24 June 2000 (aged 24)	(Germany) Kölner Haie
83	F	Leonhard Pföderl	1.84 m (6 ft 0 in)	87 kg (192 lb)	1 September 1993 (aged 31)	(Germany) Eisbären Berlin
92	F	Marcel Noebels	1.92 m (6 ft 4 in)	92 kg (203 lb)	14 March 1992 (aged 33)	(Germany) Eisbären Berlin
95	F	Frederik Tiffels	1.83 m (6 ft 0 in)	87 kg (192 lb)	20 May 1995 (aged 29)	(Germany) Eisbären Berlin

=== Hungary ===
The roster was announced on 7 May 2025.

Head coach: Gergely Majoross

No.	Pos.	Name	Height	Weight	Birthdate	Team
1	G	Bence Bálizs	1.93 m (6 ft 4 in)	95 kg (209 lb)	30 May 1993 (aged 31)	(Norway) Sparta Sarpsborg
5	F	Domán Szongoth	1.84 m (6 ft 0 in)	83 kg (183 lb)	8 June 2008 (aged 16)	(Finland) KooKoo
7	F	András Mihalik	1.84 m (6 ft 0 in)	88 kg (194 lb)	4 May 2003 (aged 22)	(Hungary) DEAC
8	D	Bence Szabó	1.84 m (6 ft 0 in)	89 kg (196 lb)	2 February 1998 (aged 27)	(Hungary) Budapest JA HC
10	F	Ferenc Laskawy	1.90 m (6 ft 3 in)	85 kg (187 lb)	17 February 2006 (aged 19)	(Hungary) Újpesti TE
11	D	Gabor Tornyai	1.86 m (6 ft 1 in)	96 kg (212 lb)	6 October 1998 (aged 26)	(Hungary) Újpesti TE
13	F	Krisztián Nagy	1.80 m (5 ft 11 in)	87 kg (192 lb)	28 July 1994 (aged 30)	(Hungary) Budapest JA HC
16	F	János Hári – A	1.75 m (5 ft 9 in)	77 kg (170 lb)	3 May 1992 (aged 33)	(Hungary) Fehérvár AV19
21	F	Kristóf Papp	1.79 m (5 ft 10 in)	80 kg (180 lb)	27 January 2001 (aged 24)	(United States) Iowa Heartlanders
22	F	Vilmos Galló	1.82 m (6 ft 0 in)	86 kg (190 lb)	31 July 1996 (aged 28)	(Finland) KooKoo
23	D	Zétény Hadobás	1.87 m (6 ft 2 in)	85 kg (187 lb)	2 March 2003 (aged 22)	(United States) Iowa Heartlanders
24	F	Kristof Németh	1.84 m (6 ft 0 in)	79 kg (174 lb)	13 May 2002 (aged 22)	(Hungary) Fehérvár AV19
27	D	Henrik Nilsson	1.90 m (6 ft 3 in)	86 kg (190 lb)	5 May 1991 (aged 34)	(Sweden) Kalmar HC
30	G	Adam Vay	1.96 m (6 ft 5 in)	103 kg (227 lb)	22 March 1994 (aged 31)	(Slovakia) HK Poprad
33	D	Milán Horváth	1.86 m (6 ft 1 in)	93 kg (205 lb)	2 February 2001 (aged 24)	(Hungary) Budapest JA HC
34	F	István Terbócs – A	1.83 m (6 ft 0 in)	92 kg (203 lb)	28 June 1996 (aged 28)	(Hungary) Fehérvár AV19
35	G	Dominik Horváth	1.86 m (6 ft 1 in)	91 kg (201 lb)	8 January 2001 (aged 24)	(Hungary) Fehérvár AV19
36	F	Csanád Erdély – C	1.88 m (6 ft 2 in)	86 kg (190 lb)	5 April 1996 (aged 29)	(Hungary) Fehérvár AV19
55	D	Tamás Ortenszky	1.87 m (6 ft 2 in)	91 kg (201 lb)	5 January 2002 (aged 23)	(Switzerland) EHC Winterthur
61	F	Péter Vincze	1.80 m (5 ft 11 in)	85 kg (187 lb)	16 February 1995 (aged 30)	(Romania) Gyergyói HK
68	F	Bence Horváth	1.82 m (6 ft 0 in)	85 kg (187 lb)	22 February 2004 (aged 21)	(Finland) Jukurit
70	D	Zsombor Garát	1.85 m (6 ft 1 in)	90 kg (200 lb)	27 July 1997 (aged 27)	(United Kingdom) Nottingham Panthers
82	D	Simon Szathmary	1.78 m (5 ft 10 in)	81 kg (179 lb)	4 October 1995 (aged 29)	(Hungary) DVTK Jegesmedvék
87	F	Gergő Ambrus	1.76 m (5 ft 9 in)	65 kg (143 lb)	6 December 2001 (aged 23)	(Hungary) Fehérvár AV19
93	F	Akos Mihaly	1.82 m (6 ft 0 in)	76 kg (168 lb)	25 September 1999 (aged 25)	(Hungary) Fehérvár AV19

=== Kazakhstan ===
The roster was announced on 6 May 2025.

Head coach: Oleg Bolyakin

No.	Pos.	Name	Height	Weight	Birthdate	Team
1	G	Jelal-ad-Din Amirbekov	1.96 m (6 ft 5 in)	79 kg (174 lb)	24 September 2002 (aged 22)	(Russia) Metallurg Magnitogorsk
7	D	Leonid Metalnikov	1.82 m (6 ft 0 in)	85 kg (187 lb)	25 April 1990 (aged 35)	(Russia) Admiral Vladivostok
10	F	Nikita Mikhailis – A	1.75 m (5 ft 9 in)	75 kg (165 lb)	18 June 1995 (aged 29)	(Russia) Metallurg Magnitogorsk
13	F	Dinmukhamed Kaiyrzhan	1.84 m (6 ft 0 in)	84 kg (185 lb)	27 June 2003 (aged 21)	(Kazakhstan) Barys Astana
17	F	Alikhan Omirbekov	1.75 m (5 ft 9 in)	73 kg (161 lb)	14 June 2001 (aged 23)	(Kazakhstan) Barys Astana
18	F	Vladimir Volkov	1.77 m (5 ft 10 in)	75 kg (165 lb)	3 October 1996 (aged 28)	(Kazakhstan) Arlan Kokshetau
20	G	Maxim Pavlenko	1.95 m (6 ft 5 in)	82 kg (181 lb)	4 June 2002 (aged 22)	(Russia) HC Ryazan
22	F	Kirill Panyukov	1.87 m (6 ft 2 in)	92 kg (203 lb)	22 May 1997 (aged 27)	(Kazakhstan) Barys Astana
23	F	Maxim Mukhametov	1.82 m (6 ft 0 in)	80 kg (180 lb)	30 April 1999 (aged 26)	(Kazakhstan) Barys Astana
24	D	Dmitri Breus	1.85 m (6 ft 1 in)	88 kg (194 lb)	22 February 2004 (aged 21)	(Russia) Torpedo Nizhny Novgorod
27	F	Artyom Likhotnikov	1.89 m (6 ft 2 in)	100 kg (220 lb)	11 May 1994 (aged 30)	(Uzbekistan) Humo Tashkent
28	D	Valeri Orekhov	1.86 m (6 ft 1 in)	90 kg (200 lb)	17 July 1999 (aged 25)	(Russia) Metallurg Magnitogorsk
31	D	Artyom Korolyov	1.85 m (6 ft 1 in)	74 kg (163 lb)	20 September 2001 (aged 23)	(Kazakhstan) Nomad Astana
32	G	Sergei Kudryavtsev	1.85 m (6 ft 1 in)	86 kg (190 lb)	5 April 1995 (aged 30)	(Kazakhstan) Arlan Kokshetau
33	D	Eduard Mikhailov	1.83 m (6 ft 0 in)	82 kg (181 lb)	20 October 1996 (aged 28)	(Kazakhstan) Arlan Kokshetau
34	F	Vyacheslav Kolesnikov	1.85 m (6 ft 1 in)	85 kg (187 lb)	1 August 2000 (aged 24)	(Kazakhstan) Nomad Astana
48	F	Roman Starchenko – C	1.79 m (5 ft 10 in)	88 kg (194 lb)	12 May 1986 (aged 38)	(Kazakhstan) Barys Astana
58	D	Tamirlan Gaitamirov	1.93 m (6 ft 4 in)	93 kg (205 lb)	23 August 2000 (aged 24)	(Kazakhstan) Barys Astana
64	F	Arkadiy Shestakov	1.82 m (6 ft 0 in)	83 kg (183 lb)	24 March 1995 (aged 30)	(Russia) Admiral Vladivostok
71	D	Samat Daniyar	1.83 m (6 ft 0 in)	73 kg (161 lb)	24 January 1999 (aged 26)	(Kazakhstan) Barys Astana
81	F	Batyrlan Muratov	1.85 m (6 ft 1 in)	79 kg (174 lb)	1 February 1999 (aged 26)	(Kazakhstan) Barys Astana
84	F	Kirill Savitsky	1.83 m (6 ft 0 in)	87 kg (192 lb)	9 March 1995 (aged 30)	(Kazakhstan) Barys Astana
87	D	Adil Beketayev	1.93 m (6 ft 4 in)	93 kg (205 lb)	23 April 1998 (aged 27)	(Kazakhstan) Barys Astana
88	F	Yevgeni Rymarev	1.75 m (5 ft 9 in)	78 kg (172 lb)	9 September 1988 (aged 36)	(Russia) HC Chelny
96	F	Alikhan Asetov – A	1.96 m (6 ft 5 in)	91 kg (201 lb)	26 August 1996 (aged 28)	(Kazakhstan) Barys Astana

=== Norway ===
The roster was announced on 7 May 2025.

Head coach: (Sweden) Tobias Johansson

No.	Pos.	Name	Height	Weight	Birthdate	Team
2	D	Isak Hansen	1.89 m (6 ft 2 in)	93 kg (205 lb)	2 October 2003 (aged 21)	(Sweden) Vimmerby HC
4	D	Johannes Johannesen	1.81 m (5 ft 11 in)	85 kg (187 lb)	1 March 1997 (aged 28)	(Finland) Lahti Pelicans
5	D	Jonas Nyhus Myhre	1.88 m (6 ft 2 in)	94 kg (207 lb)	19 March 2004 (aged 21)	(Norway) Sparta Sarpsborg
7	D	Sander Engebråten	1.82 m (6 ft 0 in)	82 kg (181 lb)	7 July 2002 (aged 22)	(Sweden) BIK Karlskoga
12	F	Noah Steen – A	1.85 m (6 ft 1 in)	86 kg (190 lb)	16 August 2004 (aged 20)	(Sweden) Örebro HK
13	F	Petter Vesterheim	1.81 m (5 ft 11 in)	80 kg (180 lb)	30 September 2004 (aged 20)	(Sweden) Malmö Redhawks
17	F	Eirik Østrem Salsten	1.85 m (6 ft 1 in)	88 kg (194 lb)	17 June 1994 (aged 30)	(Czech Republic) Energie Karlovy Vary
18	F	Thomas Valkvæ Olsen	1.86 m (6 ft 1 in)	92 kg (203 lb)	25 June 1995 (aged 29)	(Finland) Jukurit
19	F	Håvard Østrem Salsten	1.88 m (6 ft 2 in)	90 kg (200 lb)	19 August 2000 (aged 24)	(Norway) Storhamar Hockey
21	F	Martin Johnsen	1.78 m (5 ft 10 in)	80 kg (180 lb)	7 March 2004 (aged 21)	(Sweden) Mora IK
22	F	Martin Rønnild	1.86 m (6 ft 1 in)	95 kg (209 lb)	24 January 1996 (aged 29)	(Norway) Storhamar Hockey
23	F	Thomas Berg-Paulsen – C	1.86 m (6 ft 1 in)	85 kg (187 lb)	6 August 1999 (aged 25)	(Sweden) Malmö Redhawks
24	F	Jacob Berglund	1.85 m (6 ft 1 in)	92 kg (203 lb)	17 November 1991 (aged 33)	(Norway) Storhamar Hockey
26	F	Patrick Elvsveen	1.76 m (5 ft 9 in)	84 kg (185 lb)	16 September 2002 (aged 22)	(Norway) Stavanger Oilers
27	F	Andreas Martinsen	1.90 m (6 ft 3 in)	105 kg (231 lb)	13 June 1990 (aged 34)	(Norway) Storhamar Hockey
28	F	Michael Brandsegg-Nygård	1.84 m (6 ft 0 in)	94 kg (207 lb)	5 October 2005 (aged 19)	(United States) Grand Rapids Griffins
30	G	Tobias Normann	1.86 m (6 ft 1 in)	85 kg (187 lb)	3 August 2001 (aged 23)	(Sweden) Frölunda HC
31	G	Jonas Arntzen	1.93 m (6 ft 4 in)	90 kg (200 lb)	21 November 1997 (aged 27)	(Sweden) Örebro HK
32	G	Mathias Schjerpen Arnkværn	1.86 m (6 ft 1 in)	87 kg (192 lb)	7 November 2003 (aged 21)	(Norway) Vålerenga Ishockey
37	F	Markus Vikingstad	1.94 m (6 ft 4 in)	96 kg (212 lb)	27 October 1999 (aged 25)	(Germany) Fischtown Pinguins
39	F	Simen Andre Edvardsen	1.80 m (5 ft 11 in)	89 kg (196 lb)	1 January 1999 (aged 26)	(Sweden) BIK Karlskoga
43	D	Max Krogdahl	1.88 m (6 ft 2 in)	93 kg (205 lb)	21 October 1998 (aged 26)	(Sweden) Djurgårdens IF
47	D	Adrian Saxrud-Danielsen	1.90 m (6 ft 3 in)	93 kg (205 lb)	27 September 1992 (aged 32)	(Norway) Storhamar Hockey
54	D	Sander Hurrod	1.85 m (6 ft 1 in)	85 kg (187 lb)	2 April 2000 (aged 25)	(Norway) Storhamar Hockey
71	F	Eskild Bakke Olsen	1.87 m (6 ft 2 in)	93 kg (205 lb)	19 March 2002 (aged 23)	(Sweden) BIK Karlskoga
72	D	Stian Solberg	1.89 m (6 ft 2 in)	92 kg (203 lb)	29 December 2005 (aged 19)	(United States) San Diego Gulls
78	D	Emil Lilleberg – A	1.88 m (6 ft 2 in)	94 kg (207 lb)	2 February 2001 (aged 24)	(United States) Tampa Bay Lightning

=== Switzerland ===
The roster was announced on 5 May 2025. Following Nico Hischier's exit from the tournament, Andrea Glauser was named captain.

Head coach: Patrick Fischer

No.	Pos.	Name	Height	Weight	Birthdate	Team
8	F	Simon Knak	1.88 m (6 ft 2 in)	86 kg (190 lb)	27 January 2002 (aged 23)	(Switzerland) HC Davos
9	F	Damien Riat	1.83 m (6 ft 0 in)	85 kg (187 lb)	26 February 1997 (aged 28)	(Switzerland) Lausanne HC
10	F	Andres Ambühl	1.76 m (5 ft 9 in)	86 kg (190 lb)	14 September 1983 (aged 41)	(Switzerland) HC Davos
13	F	Nico Hischier – C	1.86 m (6 ft 1 in)	88 kg (194 lb)	4 January 1999 (aged 26)	(United States) New Jersey Devils
14	D	Dean Kukan	1.87 m (6 ft 2 in)	87 kg (192 lb)	8 July 1993 (aged 31)	(Switzerland) ZSC Lions
15	F	Grégory Hofmann	1.84 m (6 ft 0 in)	90 kg (200 lb)	13 November 1992 (aged 32)	(Switzerland) EV Zug
17	F	Ken Jäger	1.86 m (6 ft 1 in)	83 kg (183 lb)	30 May 1998 (aged 26)	(Switzerland) Lausanne HC
21	F	Kevin Fiala	1.80 m (5 ft 11 in)	93 kg (205 lb)	22 July 1996 (aged 28)	(United States) Los Angeles Kings
22	F	Nino Niederreiter	1.88 m (6 ft 2 in)	95 kg (209 lb)	8 September 1992 (aged 32)	(Canada) Winnipeg Jets
26	G	Sandro Aeschlimann	1.84 m (6 ft 0 in)	84 kg (185 lb)	26 December 1994 (aged 30)	(Switzerland) HC Davos
28	F	Timo Meier	1.84 m (6 ft 0 in)	100 kg (220 lb)	8 October 1996 (aged 28)	(United States) New Jersey Devils
34	G	Stéphane Charlin	1.93 m (6 ft 4 in)	95 kg (209 lb)	30 August 2000 (aged 24)	(Switzerland) SCL Tigers
43	D	Andrea Glauser– C	1.82 m (6 ft 0 in)	86 kg (190 lb)	3 April 1996 (aged 29)	(Switzerland) Lausanne HC
45	D	Michael Fora	1.92 m (6 ft 4 in)	98 kg (216 lb)	30 October 1995 (aged 29)	(Switzerland) HC Davos
54	D	Christian Marti	1.90 m (6 ft 3 in)	96 kg (212 lb)	29 March 1993 (aged 32)	(Switzerland) ZSC Lions
56	D	Tim Berni	1.83 m (6 ft 0 in)	86 kg (190 lb)	11 February 2000 (aged 25)	(Switzerland) Genève-Servette
62	F	Denis Malgin	1.75 m (5 ft 9 in)	80 kg (180 lb)	18 January 1997 (aged 28)	(Switzerland) ZSC Lions
63	G	Leonardo Genoni	1.83 m (6 ft 0 in)	83 kg (183 lb)	28 August 1987 (aged 37)	(Switzerland) EV Zug
71	D	Jonas Siegenthaler	1.89 m (6 ft 2 in)	99 kg (218 lb)	6 May 1997 (aged 28)	(United States) New Jersey Devils
72	F	Dominik Egli	1.74 m (5 ft 9 in)	81 kg (179 lb)	20 August 1998 (aged 26)	(Sweden) Frölunda HC
73	F	Sandro Schmid	1.80 m (5 ft 11 in)	82 kg (181 lb)	3 June 2000 (aged 24)	(Switzerland) Fribourg-Gottéron
80	F	Nicolas Baechler	1.88 m (6 ft 2 in)	92 kg (203 lb)	23 August 2003 (aged 21)	(Switzerland) ZSC Lions
85	F	Sven Andrighetto – A	1.77 m (5 ft 10 in)	85 kg (187 lb)	21 March 1993 (aged 32)	(Switzerland) ZSC Lions
86	D	J.J. Moser	1.85 m (6 ft 1 in)	83 kg (183 lb)	6 June 2000 (aged 24)	(United States) Tampa Bay Lightning
88	F	Christoph Bertschy	1.77 m (5 ft 10 in)	84 kg (185 lb)	5 April 1994 (aged 31)	(Switzerland) Fribourg-Gottéron
95	F	Tyler Moy	1.86 m (6 ft 1 in)	92 kg (203 lb)	18 July 1995 (aged 29)	(Switzerland) Rapperswil-Jona Lakers

=== United States ===
A 22-player roster was announced on 30 April 2025.

Head coach: Ryan Warsofsky

No.	Pos.	Name	Height	Weight	Birthdate	Team
1	G	Jeremy Swayman	1.91 m (6 ft 3 in)	88 kg (194 lb)	24 November 1998 (aged 26)	(United States) Boston Bruins
2	D	Jackson LaCombe	1.88 m (6 ft 2 in)	93 kg (205 lb)	9 January 2001 (aged 24)	(United States) Anaheim Ducks
6	D	Mason Lohrei	1.96 m (6 ft 5 in)	100 kg (220 lb)	17 January 2001 (aged 24)	(United States) Boston Bruins
7	D	Michael Kesselring	1.96 m (6 ft 5 in)	98 kg (216 lb)	13 January 2000 (aged 25)	(United States) Utah Mammoth
8	D	Zach Werenski	1.88 m (6 ft 2 in)	99 kg (218 lb)	19 July 1997 (aged 27)	(United States) Columbus Blue Jackets
9	F	Clayton Keller – C	1.78 m (5 ft 10 in)	79 kg (174 lb)	29 July 1998 (aged 26)	(United States) Utah Mammoth
10	F	Matty Beniers	1.88 m (6 ft 2 in)	82 kg (181 lb)	5 November 2002 (aged 22)	(United States) Seattle Kraken
12	F	Shane Pinto	1.91 m (6 ft 3 in)	93 kg (205 lb)	12 November 2000 (aged 24)	(Canada) Ottawa Senators
18	F	Drew O'Connor	1.93 m (6 ft 4 in)	95 kg (209 lb)	9 June 1998 (aged 26)	(Canada) Vancouver Canucks
19	F	Cutter Gauthier	1.88 m (6 ft 2 in)	91 kg (201 lb)	19 January 2004 (aged 21)	(United States) Anaheim Ducks
20	D	Andrew Peeke	1.91 m (6 ft 3 in)	97 kg (214 lb)	17 March 1998 (aged 27)	(United States) Boston Bruins
22	F	Isaac Howard	1.80 m (5 ft 11 in)	86 kg (190 lb)	30 March 2004 (aged 21)	(United States) Michigan State Spartans
23	F	Mikey Eyssimont	1.83 m (6 ft 0 in)	91 kg (201 lb)	9 September 1996 (aged 28)	(United States) Seattle Kraken
28	D	Zeev Buium	1.83 m (6 ft 0 in)	83 kg (183 lb)	7 December 2005 (aged 19)	(United States) Minnesota Wild
30	G	Hampton Slukynsky	1.88 m (6 ft 2 in)	84 kg (185 lb)	2 July 2005 (aged 19)	(United States) Western Michigan Broncos
35	G	Joey Daccord	1.88 m (6 ft 2 in)	91 kg (201 lb)	19 August 1996 (aged 28)	(United States) Seattle Kraken
43	F	Will Smith	1.84 m (6 ft 0 in)	82 kg (181 lb)	17 March 2005 (aged 20)	(United States) San Jose Sharks
47	F	Michael McCarron	1.98 m (6 ft 6 in)	105 kg (231 lb)	7 March 1995 (aged 30)	(United States) Nashville Predators
72	F	Tage Thompson – A	1.98 m (6 ft 6 in)	100 kg (220 lb)	30 October 1997 (aged 27)	(United States) Buffalo Sabres
73	D	Alex Vlasic	1.98 m (6 ft 6 in)	98 kg (216 lb)	5 June 2001 (aged 23)	(United States) Chicago Blackhawks
76	D	Brady Skjei – A	1.91 m (6 ft 3 in)	95 kg (209 lb)	26 March 1994 (aged 31)	(United States) Nashville Predators
81	F	Josh Doan	1.88 m (6 ft 2 in)	90 kg (200 lb)	1 February 2002 (aged 23)	(United States) Utah Mammoth
83	F	Conor Garland	1.78 m (5 ft 10 in)	75 kg (165 lb)	11 March 1996 (aged 29)	(Canada) Vancouver Canucks
91	F	Frank Nazar	1.78 m (5 ft 10 in)	86 kg (190 lb)	14 January 2004 (aged 21)	(United States) Chicago Blackhawks
92	F	Logan Cooley	1.83 m (6 ft 0 in)	87 kg (192 lb)	4 May 2004 (aged 21)	(United States) Utah Mammoth
