= 2025 IIHF World Championship Group A =

Ice hockey tournament group stage

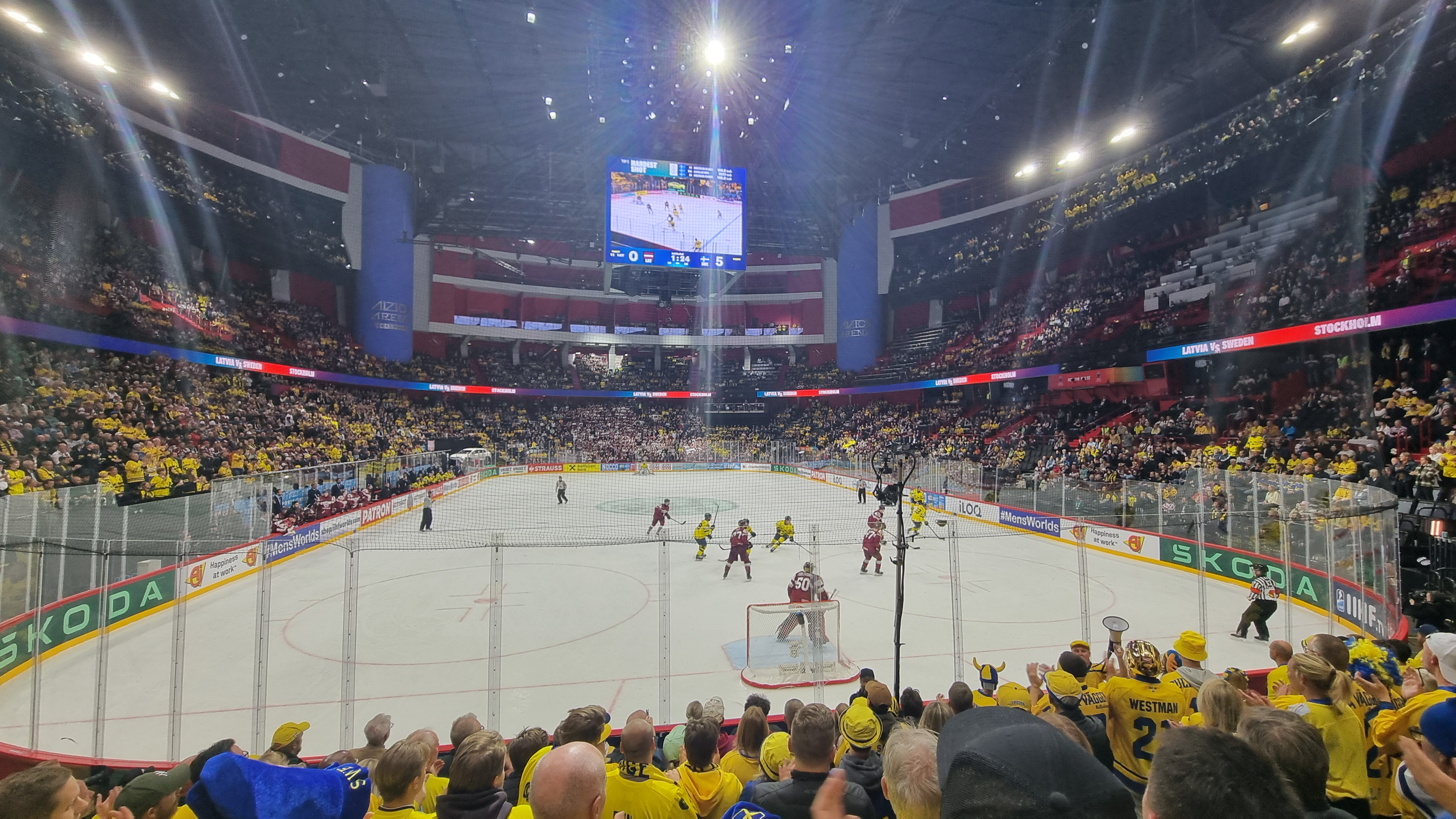
Preliminary round game between Sweden and Latvia

Group A was one of two groups of the 2025 IIHF World Championship. The four best-placed teams advanced to the playoff round, while the last placed team was relegated to Division I in 2026.

== Standings ==
Pos	Team	Pld	W	OTW	OTL	L	GF	GA	GD	Pts	Qualification or relegation
1	Canada	7	6	0	1	0	34	7	+27	19	Quarterfinals
2	Sweden (H)	7	6	0	0	1	28	8	+20	18	Quarterfinals
3	Finland	7	4	2	0	1	22	10	+12	16	Quarterfinals
4	Austria	7	2	2	0	3	21	18	+3	10	Quarterfinals
5	Latvia	7	3	0	0	4	17	25	−8	9	Qualified for the 2026 IIHF World Championship
6	Slovakia	7	2	0	1	4	9	24	−15	7	Qualified for the 2026 IIHF World Championship
7	Slovenia	7	1	0	1	5	9	29	−20	4	Qualified for the 2026 IIHF World Championship
8	France	7	0	0	1	6	8	27	−19	1	Relegated to the 2026 Division I A

Source: IIHF
Rules for classification: 1) points; 2) head-to-head points; 3) head-to-head goal difference; 4) head-to-head number of goals scored; 5) result against closest best-ranked team outside tied teams; 6) result against second-best-ranked team outside tied teams; 7) seeding before tournament
(H) Host

== Matches ==
All times are local (UTC+2).

=== Austria vs Finland ===
9 May 2025; 16:20	Austria	1–2 (1–2, 0–0, 0–0)	Finland	Avicii Arena, Stockholm; Attendance: 6,822

Game reference

Atte Tolvanen
Goalies
Juuse Saros
Referees:
(Canada) Michael Campbell
(Switzerland) Michael Tscherrig
Linesmen:
(United States) Shane Gustafson
(Sweden) Ludvig Lundgren

	0–1	04:38 – Puistola (Salo, Hämeenaho)
	0–2	07:06 – Pärssinen (Seppälä, Pesonen)
Wolf (Unterweger, Schneider) – 13:54	1–2

8 min
Penalties
8 min
16
Shots
28

=== Sweden vs Slovakia ===
9 May 2025; 20:20	Sweden	5–0 (3–0, 1–0, 1–0)	Slovakia	Avicii Arena, Stockholm; Attendance: 12,530

Game reference

Jacob Markström
Goalies
Patrik Rybár
Referees:
(Finland) Riku Brander
(Denmark) Mads Frandsen
Linesmen:
(United States) Jake Davis
(Czech Republic) Daniel Hynek

Backlund (Heineman, Lindholm) – 11:17	1–0
Carlsson (Pettersson, Johansson) – 18:50	2–0
Brodin (Larsson, Lundeström) – 19:54	3–0
Lindholm (Gustafsson, Backlund) – 38:46	4–0
Zibanejad (Andersson, Pettersson) – 57:33	5–0

0 min
Penalties
2 min
20
Shots
15

=== Slovenia vs Canada ===
10 May 2025; 12:20	Slovenia	0–4 (0–1, 0–3, 0–0)	Canada	Avicii Arena, Stockholm; Attendance: 9,011

Game reference

Lukaš Horak
Goalies
Dylan Garand
Referees:
(Sweden) Christoffer Holm
(Germany) André Schrader
Linesmen:
(Denmark) Albert Ankerstjerne
(Finland) Tommi Niittylä

0–1	07:22 – Horvat (MacKinnon, Konecny) (PP)
0–2	23:41 – MacKinnon (Weegar)
0–3	33:38 – Horvat (MacKinnon, Montour) (PP)
0–4	36:55 – Dobson (Celebrini, O'Reilly) (PP)

14 min
Penalties
4 min
11
Shots
44

=== Sweden vs Austria ===
10 May 2025; 16:20	Sweden	4–2 (0–0, 1–1, 3–1)	Austria	Avicii Arena, Stockholm; Attendance: 12,530

Game reference

Samuel Ersson
Goalies
David Kickert
Referees:
(Czech Republic) Jan Hribik
(United States) Sean MacFarlane
Linesmen:
(Switzerland) Dominic Schlegel
(Latvia) Dāvis Zunde

	0–1	25:30 – Baumgartner (Raffl, Rohrer)
Zibanejad (Gustafsson, Johansson) (PP) – 33:26	1–1
	1–2	52:26 – Kasper (Schnetzer)
Brodin (Raymond, Lindholm) (EA) – 57:41	2–2
Zibanejad (Andersson) – 57:53	3–2
Wennberg (Backlund, Lindholm) (EN) – 58:39	4–2

2 min
Penalties
8 min
25
Shots
16

=== France vs Latvia ===
10 May 2025; 20:20	France	1–4 (1–0, 0–1, 0–3)	Latvia	Avicii Arena, Stockholm; Attendance: 7,564

Game reference

Quentin Papillon
Goalies
Kristers Gudļevskis
Referees:
(Finland) Riku Brander
(Switzerland) Michael Tscherrig
Linesmen:
(Czech Republic) Daniel Hynek
(Sweden) Ludvig Lundgren

Fabre (Boscq, Crinon) – 15:02	1–0
	1–1	35:36 – Dzierkals (SH)
	1–2	42:02 – Zīle (Komuls, Balcers)
	1–3	58:36 – Ločmelis (EN)
	1–4	59:29 – Ločmelis (Tralmaks) (EN)

8 min
Penalties
4 min
19
Shots
20

=== Slovakia vs Slovenia ===
11 May 2025; 12:20	Slovakia	3–1 (2–0, 1–0, 0–1)	Slovenia	Avicii Arena, Stockholm; Attendance: 3,870

Game reference

Samuel Hlavaj
Goalies
Matija Pintarič
Referees:
(United States) Sean MacFarlane
(Germany) André Schrader
Linesmen:
(United States) Shane Gustafson
(Latvia) Dāvis Zunde

Čederle (Sýkora) – 08:20	1–0
Regenda (Kňažko, Grman) – 09:26	2–0
Krištof (Lantoši, Mudrák) (PP) – 31:12	3–0
	3–1	46:29 – Ograjenšek (Sabolič, Macuh) (PP)

10 min
Penalties
10 min
39
Shots
18

=== Latvia vs Canada ===
11 May 2025; 16:20	Latvia	1–7 (1–2, 0–3, 0–2)	Canada	Avicii Arena, Stockholm; Attendance: 9,531

Game reference

Gustavs Grigals
Goalies
Marc-André Fleury
Referees:
(Denmark) Mads Frandsen
(Czech Republic) Jan Hribik
Linesmen:
(United States) Jake Davis
(Finland) Tommi Niittylä

Tralmaks (Ločmelis) – 07:05	1–0
	1–1	09:30 – Konecny (Sanheim, Crosby)
	1–2	10:31 – MacKinnon (Horvat)
	1–3	27:11 – Johnson (Montour, Crosby)
	1–4	31:10 – Johnson
	1–5	39:36 – Konecny (SH)
	1–6	45:09 – Celebrini (Konecny, Crosby)
	1–7	55:18 – Hayton (Danault)

12 min
Penalties
12 min
17
Shots
37

=== Finland vs France ===
11 May 2025; 20:20	Finland	4–3 OT (0–0, 1–1, 2–2) (OT: 1–0)	France	Avicii Arena, Stockholm; Attendance: 3,832

Game reference

Emil Larmi
Goalies
Antoine Keller
Referees:
(Canada) Michael Campbell
(Sweden) Mikael Holm
Linesmen:
(Denmark) Albert Ankerstjerne
(United States) Dominic Schlegel

	0–1	28:01 – P. Bozon (Spinozzi, T. Bozon) (PP)
Teräväinen (Lehtonen, Saarijärvi) – 37:33	1–1
	1–2	50:57 – T. Bozon (Perret, Bellemare) (PP)
	1–3	57:18 – Perret (Bellemare) (EN)
Tolvanen (Lehtonen) (EA) – 58:27	2–3
Tolvanen (Lehtonen, Teräväinen) (EA) – 59:32	3–3
Pärssinen (Tolvanen, Lammikko) – 61:24	4–3

6 min
Penalties
4 min
51
Shots
19

=== Austria vs Slovakia ===
12 May 2025; 16:20	Austria	3–2 GWS (2–0, 0–1, 0–1) (OT: 0–0) (SO: 1–0)	Slovakia	Avicii Arena, Stockholm; Attendance: 4,375

Game reference

David Kickert
Goalies
Samuel Hlavaj
Referees:
(Denmark) Mads Frandsen
(Switzerland) Michael Tscherrig
Linesmen:
(Sweden) Ludvig Lundgren
(Switzerland) Dominic Schlegel

Schneider (Wolf, Kasper) – 07:33	1–0
Kasper (Schneider, Unterweger) – 11:22	2–0
	2–1	26:15 – Honzek
	2–2	50:53 – Sukeľ (Takáč, Čajkovič)

Kasper (miss)
Zwerger (miss)
Baumgartner (miss)
Haudum
Schneider
Shootout
(miss) Čajkovič
Chromiak
(miss) Dvorský
(miss) Lantoši
(miss) Krištof
8 min
Penalties
4 min
22
Shots
33

=== Finland vs Sweden ===
12 May 2025; 20:20	Finland	1–2 (0–1, 0–1, 1–0)	Sweden	Avicii Arena, Stockholm; Attendance: 12,530

Game reference

Juuse Saros
Goalies
Jacob Markström
Referees:
(United States) Sean MacFarlane
(Germany) André Schrader
Linesmen:
(United States) Jake Davis
(United States) Shane Gustafson

	0–1	04:45 – Carlsson (Gustafsson, Raymond) (PP)
	0–2	27:23 – Brodin (Raymond)
Pesonen (Lehtonen, Björninen) – 53:04	1–2

8 min
Penalties
2 min
19
Shots
41

=== Slovenia vs Latvia ===
13 May 2025; 16:20	Slovenia	2–5 (0–0, 2–4, 0–1)	Latvia	Avicii Arena, Stockholm; Attendance: 3,423

Game reference

Lukáš Horák
Goalies
Kristers Gudļevskis
Referees:
(Canada) Michael Campbell
(Sweden) Mikael Holm
Linesmen:
(Denmark) Albert Ankerstjerne
(Finland) Tommi Niittylä

Mahkovec (Simšič) – 22:40	1–0
	1–1	28:50 – Rubīns (Egle, Andersons)
	1–2	32:02 – Ravinskis (Tralmaks, Jaks)
	1–3	32:23 – Dzierkals (Andersons)
Gregorc – 32:54	2–3
	2–4	33:45 – Ločmelis (Mamčics, Tralmaks)
	2–5	54:16 – Tralmaks (Rubīns)

0 min
Penalties
4 min
18
Shots
24

=== Canada vs France ===
13 May 2025; 20:20	Canada	5–0 (2–0, 1–0, 2–0)	France	Avicii Arena, Stockholm; Attendance: 4,124

Game reference

Jordan Binnington
Goalies
Julian Junca
Referees:
(Czech Republic) Jan Hribik
(Finland) Mikko Kaukokari
Linesmen:
(Czech Republic) Jiří Ondráček
(Latvia) Dāvis Zunde

Horvat (Foerster) – 06:32	1–0
Cuylle (Johnson, O'Reilly) – 12:11	2–0
Crosby (Montour) (PP) – 37:31	3–0
Horvat (Konecny, MacKinnon) (PP) – 43:57	4–0
Montour (Hayton, Schenn) – 51:05	5–0

2 min
Penalties
4 min
36
Shots
15

=== Slovakia vs France ===
14 May 2025; 16:20	Slovakia	2–1 (0–0, 1–1, 1–0)	France	Avicii Arena, Stockholm; Attendance: 2,915

Game reference

Samuel Hlavaj
Goalies
Antoine Keller
Referees:
(Canada) Michael Campbell
(Germany) André Schrader
Linesmen:
(United States) Jake Davis
(Finland) Tommi Niittylä

Chromiak (Honzek, Dvorský) – 29:32	1–0
	1–1	34:34 – Boudon (Dair, Treille
Rosandić (Čajkovič, Krištof) (PP) – 49:13	2–1

56 min
Penalties
35 min
35
Shots
20

=== Latvia vs Sweden ===
14 May 2025; 20:20	Latvia	0–6 (0–0, 0–2, 0–4)	Sweden	Avicii Arena, Stockholm; Attendance: 12,530

Game reference

Kristers Gudļevskis
Goalies
Samuel Ersson
Referees:
(Finland) Mikko Kaukokari
(Switzerland) Michael Tscherrig
Linesmen:
(Czech Republic) Jiří Ondráček
(Switzerland) Dominic Schlegel

0–1	30:15 – Andersson (Lindholm)
0–2	30:27 – Bengtsson (Wennberg, Brodin)
0–3	40:36 – Raymond (Carlsson, Lundeström)
0–4	48:32 – Larsson (Frödén, Carlsson)
0–5	50:46 – Zibanejad (Wennberg, Brodin)
0–6	58:49 – Lindholm (Frödén, Raymond) (PP)

10 min
Penalties
4 min
20
Shots
27

=== Finland vs Slovenia ===
15 May 2025; 16:20	Finland	9–1 (3–0, 4–1, 2–0)	Slovenia	Avicii Arena, Stockholm; Attendance: 3,875

Game reference

Juuse Saros
Goalies
Matija Pintarič
Lukaš Horak
Referees:
(Denmark) Mads Frandsen
(Czech Republic) Jan Hribik
Linesmen:
(Sweden) Ludvig Lundgren
(Latvia) Dāvis Zunde

Lehtonen (Erholtz, Pesonen) – 02:43	1–0
Lehtonen (Teräväinen, Saarijärvi) – 07:26	2–0
Saarijärvi (Hämeenaho, Puistola) – 11:33	3–0
	3–1	24:00 – Mašič (Mahkovec, Drozg)
Tolvanen (Teräväinen, Lammikko – 26:52	4–1
Hämeenaho (Merelä, Pärssinen – 28:32	5–1
Tolvanen (Teräväinen, Saarijärvi) – 35:42	6–1
Tolvanen (Teräväinen, Leppänen) – 39:35	7–1
Matinpalo (Teräväinen) (SH) – 42:28	8–1
Tolvanen (Teräväinen, Salo) – 52:54	9–1

2 min
Penalties
4 min
37
Shots
17

=== Canada vs Austria ===
15 May 2025; 20:20	Canada	5–1 (0–1, 2–0, 3–0)	Austria	Avicii Arena, Stockholm; Attendance: 5,259

Game reference

Marc-André Fleury
Goalies
Florian Vorauer
Referees:
(Sweden) Mikael Holm
(United States) Sean MacFarlane
Linesmen:
(Denmark) Albert Ankerstjerne
(United States) Shane Gustafson

	0–1	11:20 – Rohrer (Lebler, Baumgartner)
MacKinnon (Montour, Horvat) (PP) – 21:59	1–1
MacKinnon (Montour, Danault) (EA) – 33:10	2–1
Konecny (Cuylle, Dobson) – 48:32	3–1
Cuylle (Konecny, Montour) – 51:42	4–1
Crosby (Horvat, MacKinnon) – 58:27	5–1

4 min
Penalties
4 min
52
Shots
16

=== Austria vs France ===
16 May 2025; 16:20	Austria	5–2 (3–0, 0–0, 2–2)	France	Avicii Arena, Stockholm; Attendance: 4,873

Game reference

David Kickert
Goalies
Antoine Keller
Quentin Papillon
Referees:
(Finland) Mikko Kaukokari
(Germany) André Schrader
Linesmen:
(Finland) Tommi Niittylä
(Switzerland) Dominic Schlegel

Kasper (Zwerger, Unterweger) – 00:39	1–0
Rohrer (Haudum, Lebler) – 07:58	2–0
Schnetzer – 15:30	3–0
	3–1	50:09 – Perret (Bellemare, Texier) (PP)
Kasper (Zwerger, Rohrer) (EN) – 57:56	4–1
	4–2	58:26 – Bellemare (Texier, Perret) (PP)
Schneider (Zwerger) (EN) – 59:09	5–2

14 min
Penalties
6 min
24
Shots
23

=== Sweden vs Slovenia ===
16 May 2025; 20:20	Sweden	4–0 (0–0, 2–0, 2–0)	Slovenia	Avicii Arena, Stockholm; Attendance: 12,530

Game reference

Jacob Markström
Goalies
Lukas Horak
Referees:
(United States) Sean MacFarlane
(Switzerland) Michael Tscherrig
Linesmen:
(Denmark) Albert Ankerstjerne
(United States) Shane Gustafson

Lindholm (Backlund, Gustafsson) – 25:04	1–0
Lindholm (Pettersson, Forsberg) – 38:05	2–0
Lindholm (Brodin, Larsson) – 51:13	3–0
Johansson (Gustafsson, Edvinsson) – 56:08	4–0

2 min
Penalties
6 min
60
Shots
9

=== Finland vs Latvia ===
17 May 2025; 12:20	Finland	2–1 (0–0, 1–0, 1–1)	Latvia	Avicii Arena, Stockholm; Attendance: 12,530

Game reference

Juuse Saros
Goalies
Kristers Gudļevskis
Referees:
(Canada) Michael Campbell
(Sweden) Mikael Holm
Linesmen:
(United States) Jake Davis
(Czech Republic) Jiří Ondráček

Pärssinen (Hämeenaho, Leppänen) – 27:37	1–0
Lehtonen (Teräväinen, Tolvanen) (PP) – 50:55	2–0
	2–1	55:09 – Ābols (Balcers, Freibergs)

12 min
Penalties
18 min
23
Shots
35

=== France vs Sweden ===
17 May 2025; 16:20	France	0–4 (0–2, 0–1, 0–1)	Sweden	Avicii Arena, Stockholm; Attendance: 12,530

Game reference

Antoine Keller
Goalies
Samuel Ersson
Referees:
(Denmark) Mads Frandsen
(Czech Republic) Jan Hribik
Linesmen:
(Finland) Tommi Niittylä
(Latvia) Dāvis Zunde

0–1	13:27 – Raymond (Carlsson, Lundeström)
0–2	14:25 – Heineman (Bengtsson, Brodin)
0–3	24:39 – Lindholm (Backlund, Raymond) (PP)
0–4	44:05 – Lundeström (Forsberg, Gustafsson)

8 min
Penalties
10 min
15
Shots
36

=== Canada vs Slovakia ===
17 May 2025; 20:20	Canada	7–0 (2–0, 3–0, 2–0)	Slovakia	Avicii Arena, Stockholm; Attendance: 12,530

Game reference

Jordan Binnington
Goalies
Patrik Rybár
Adam Húska
Referees:
(Finland) Mikko Kaukokari
(United States) Sean MacFarlane
Linesmen:
(Sweden) Ludvig Lundgren
(Switzerland) Dominic Schlegel

Montour (Konecny, Crosby) (PP) – 14:44	1–0
Foerster (Evans, Celebrini) – 15:48	2–0
Crosby (Celebrini, Montour) – 23:25	3–0
Celebrini (Crosby, Matheson) – 38:08	4–0
MacKinnon (Horvat, Matheson) – 38:59	5–0
Crosby (Dobson, Konecny) – 46:58	6–0
MacKinnon (Cuylle) – 48:34	7–0

6 min
Penalties
10 min
44
Shots
14

=== Slovenia vs Austria ===
18 May 2025; 16:20	Slovenia	2–3 GWS (1–1, 0–0, 1–1) (OT: 0–0) (SO: 0–1)	Austria	Avicii Arena, Stockholm; Attendance: 3,457

Game reference

Lukas Horak
Goalies
David Kickert
Referees:
(Germany) André Schrader
(Switzerland) Michael Tscherrig
Linesmen:
(United States) Jake Davis
(Latvia) Dāvis Zunde

Gregorc (Mahkovec, Ograjenšek) (PP) – 09:53	1–0
	1–1	13:49 – Zwerger (Schneider)
	1–2	50:20 – Lebler (Haudum, Zwerger)
Sabolič (Ćosić, Török) – 53:01	2–2

Drozg (miss)
Sabolič (miss)
Ograjenšek (miss)
Shootout
(miss) Kasper
Haudum
Zwerger
Baumgartner
10 min
Penalties
10 min
16
Shots
33

=== Slovakia vs Latvia ===
18 May 2025; 20:20	Slovakia	1–5 (1–1, 0–3, 0–1)	Latvia	Avicii Arena, Stockholm; Attendance: 7,894

Game reference

Samuel Hlavaj
Goalies
Kristers Gudļevskis
Referees:
(Canada) Michael Campbell
(Finland) Mikko Kaukokari
Linesmen:
(United States) Shane Gustafson
(Finland) Tommi Niittylä

	0–1	02:44 – Egle (Andersons, Jaks)
Čederle (Takáč, Kňažko) (PP) – 09:16	1–1
	1–2	21:31 – Ločmelis (Tralmaks)
	1–3	25:52 – Bukarts
	1–4	34:29 – Andersons (Laviņš, Egle)
	1–5	56:22 – Ābols (Daugaviņš) (EN)

6 min
Penalties
6 min
27
Shots
31

=== France vs Slovenia ===
19 May 2025; 16:20	France	1–3 (0–2, 0–0, 1–1)	Slovenia	Avicii Arena, Stockholm; Attendance: 3,273

Game reference

Quentin Papillon
Goalies
Lukaš Horak
Referees:
(Denmark) Mads Frandsen
(Germany) André Schrader
Linesmen:
(Denmark) Albert Ankerstjerne
(Czech Republic) Jiří Ondráček

	0–1	09:22 – Jezovšek (Mašič, Kapel) (PP2)
	0–2	16:21 – Simšič (Kapel, Mahkovec)
T. Bozon (Texier) (EA) – 58:05	1–2
	1–3	59:45 – Török (EN)

8 min
Penalties
4 min
29
Shots
25

=== Canada vs Finland ===
19 May 2025; 20:20	Canada	1–2 GWS (0–0, 1–0, 0–1) (OT: 0–0) (SO: 0–1)	Finland	Avicii Arena, Stockholm; Attendance: 12,530

Game reference
Marc-André Fleury	Goalies	Juuse Saros	Referees: (Sweden) Mikael Holm (Czech Republic) Jan Hribik; Linesmen: (Sweden) Ludvig Lundgren (Latvia) Dāvis Zunde
O'Reilly (Dobson) (SH) – 37:57 / 1–0; / 1–1 / 47:01 – Puistola (Matinpalo, Björninen)			Referees: (Sweden) Mikael Holm (Czech Republic) Jan Hribik; Linesmen: (Sweden) Ludvig Lundgren (Latvia) Dāvis Zunde
O'Reilly (miss); Johnson; Crosby (miss); Mackinnon (miss); Fantilli (miss)	Shootout	Puistola; (miss) Teräväinen; Tolvanen; (miss) Pyyhtiä; (miss) Hämeenaho	Referees: (Sweden) Mikael Holm (Czech Republic) Jan Hribik; Linesmen: (Sweden) Ludvig Lundgren (Latvia) Dāvis Zunde
8 min	Penalties	4 min	Referees: (Sweden) Mikael Holm (Czech Republic) Jan Hribik; Linesmen: (Sweden) Ludvig Lundgren (Latvia) Dāvis Zunde
38	Shots	22	Referees: (Sweden) Mikael Holm (Czech Republic) Jan Hribik; Linesmen: (Sweden) Ludvig Lundgren (Latvia) Dāvis Zunde

=== Latvia vs Austria ===
20 May 2025; 12:20	Latvia	1–6 (0–1, 1–2, 0–3)	Austria	Avicii Arena, Stockholm; Attendance: 4,973

Game reference

Kristers Gudļevskis
Goalies
David Kickert
Referees:
(Czech Republic) Jan Hribik
(United States) Sean MacFarlane
Linesmen:
(Sweden) Ludvig Lundgren
(Finland) Tommi Niittylä

	0–1	17:08 – Zwerger (Thaler)
	0–2	23:57 – Baumgartner (Kasper, Heinrich) (PP)
	0–3	25:38 – Rohrer
Tralmaks (Ločmelis, Ravinskis) – 28:03	1–3
	1–4	44:28 – Raffl (Schneider)
	1–5	52:29 – Zwerger (Schneider, Kasper)
	1–6	57:18 – Rohrer (SH, EN)

6 min
Penalties
8 min
29
Shots
24

=== Slovakia vs Finland ===
20 May 2025; 16:20	Slovakia	1–2 (0–1, 0–1, 1–0)	Finland	Avicii Arena, Stockholm; Attendance: 10,467

Game reference

Samuel Hlavaj
Goalies
Emil Larmi
Referees:
(Canada) Michael Campbell
(Sweden) Mikael Holm
Linesmen:
(Denmark) Albert Ankerstjerne
(Czech Republic) Jiří Ondráček

	0–1	05:18 – Puistola (Saarijärvi, Pärssinen)
	0–2	38:17 – Merelä (Järvinen, Rissanen) (EA)
Lantoši (Regenda, Sukeľ) (PP) – 54:42	1–2

8 min
Penalties
6 min
30
Shots
24

=== Sweden vs Canada ===
20 May 2025; 20:20	Sweden	3–5 (1–3, 1–1, 1–1)	Canada	Avicii Arena, Stockholm; Attendance: 12,530

Game reference

Jacob Markström
Goalies
Jordan Binnington
Referees:
(Finland) Mikko Kaukokari
(Germany) André Schrader
Linesmen:
(United States) Shane Gustafson
(Switzerland) Dominic Schlegel

	0–1	00:18 – Sanheim (MacKinnon, Konecny)
Lindholm (SH) – 03:47	1–1
	1–2	07:15 – Foerster (Spurgeon, Crosby)
	1–3	13:01 – O'Reilly (Konecny, MacKinnon)
Johansson (Forsberg, Raymond) (PP2) – 23:02	2–3
	2–4	30:50 – Celebrini (Crosby, Spurgeon)
	2–5	44:11 – MacKinnon (Konecny, Evans)
Andersson (Johansson, Carlsson) (EA) – 56:52	3–5

10 min
Penalties
12 min
28
Shots
24
