= Kristián Pospíšil =

Slovak ice hockey player (born 1996)

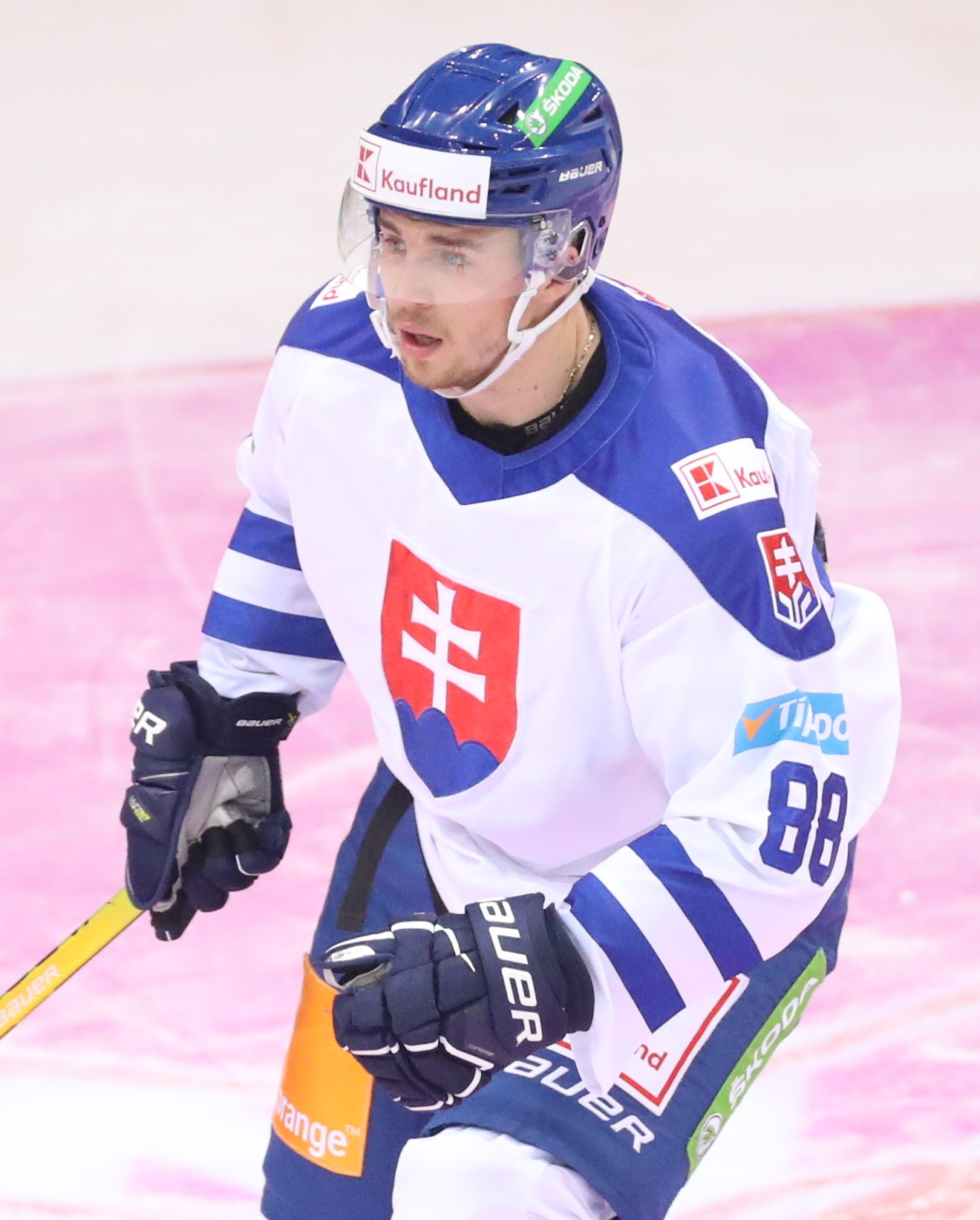
- Pospíšil in 2022
- Born: 22 April 1996 (age 30) Zvolen, Slovakia
- Height: 6 ft 2 in (188 cm)
- Weight: 179 lb (81 kg; 12 st 11 lb)
- Position: Right wing
- Shoots: Left
- ELH team Former teams: HC Kometa Brno; Lukko; HC Davos; SaiPa
- National team: Slovakia
- NHL draft: Undrafted
- Playing career: 2013–present

Kristián Pospíšil (born 22 April 1996) is a Slovak professional ice hockey player who is a right winger for HC Kometa Brno of the Czech Extraliga (ELH). His younger brother Martin is also a hockey player.

== Playing career ==
He has previously played for Blainville-Boisbriand Armada in the Quebec Major Junior Hockey League. Next season he played for Sioux City Musketeers in the United States Hockey League. He had 40 points in 48 games during the regular season. In the playoffs, he had 14 points.

In the American Hockey League played only two matches for Toronto Marlies with 2 points for 1 goal and an assist. In 2017–18 season played for Orlando Solar Bears in East Coast Hockey League. In 2018–19 he didn't play any games, but the next season signing a contract for Finnish team Lukko of the Liiga.

Returning for his fourth season in the Liiga in the 2022–23 campaign, Pospisil made 24 appearances with SaiPa, registering six goals and 11 points, before he left the club and Finland after securing a two-year contract with Czech club, HC Kometa Brno of the ELH, on 2 January 2023.

== Career statistics ==
=== Regular season and playoffs ===
			Regular season					Playoffs
Season	Team	League	GP	G	A	Pts	PIM	GP	G	A	Pts	PIM
2011–12	HKM Zvolen	SVK U18	41	18	9	27	94	—	—	—	—	—
2012–13	RB Hockey Academy	RBHRC U18	25	17	24	41	52	—	—	—	—	—
2012–13	RB Hockey Juniors	RBHRC U20	11	1	5	6	16	—	—	—	—	—
2013–14	RB Hockey Academy	RBHRC U18	6	3	9	12	31	—	—	—	—	—
2013–14	EC Salzburg U20	EBYSL	10	6	7	13	80	—	—	—	—	—
2013–14	RB Hockey Juniors	MHL	32	4	9	13	52	—	—	—	—	—
2014–15	RB Hockey Juniors	MHL	49	20	29	49	161	—	—	—	—	—
2015–16	Blainville–Boisbriand Armada	QMJHL	52	25	15	40	74	10	1	2	3	19
2016–17	Sioux City Musketeers	USHL	48	15	25	40	111	13	5	9	14	14
2017–18	Toronto Marlies	AHL	2	1	1	2	2	—	—	—	—	—
2017–18	Orlando Solar Bears	ECHL	51	13	13	26	75	—	—	—	—	—
2018–19	Newfoundland Growlers	ECHL	0	0	0	0	0	—	—	—	—	—
2019–20	Lukko	Liiga	54	15	19	34	139	—	—	—	—	—
2020–21	Lukko	Liiga	39	8	16	24	58	9	3	3	6	50
2021–22	Lukko	Liiga	18	5	5	10	18	—	—	—	—	—
2021–22	HC Davos	NL	8	1	0	1	6	4	2	2	4	6
2022–23	SaiPa	Liiga	24	6	5	11	39	—	—	—	—	—
2022–23	HC Kometa Brno	ELH	19	9	10	19	23	10	1	3	4	26
2023–24	HC Kometa Brno	ELH	48	17	18	35	90	6	1	1	2	8
2024–25	HC Kometa Brno	ELH	46	8	27	35	44	16	3	5	8	14
2025–26	HC Kometa Brno	ELH	50	14	29	43	44	7	2	3	5	2
Liiga totals			135	34	45	79	254	9	3	3	6	50
ELH totals			168	48	84	132	201	39	7	12	19	50

Medal record

Representing Slovakia

Ice hockey

Olympic Games
Bronze medal – third place	2022 Beijing	

=== International ===
Year	Team	Event	Result	GP	G	A	Pts	PIM
2014	Slovakia	WJC18	8th	5	1	1	2	10
2016	Slovakia	WJC	7th	5	0	0	0	6
2021	Slovakia	WC	8th	7	3	0	3	33
2021	Slovakia	OGQ	Q	3	0	1	1	6
2022	Slovakia	OG	3rd place, bronze medalist(s)	7	0	1	1	2
2022	Slovakia	WC	8th	5	1	0	1	6
2024	Slovakia	OGQ	Q	3	0	2	2	4
2026	Slovakia	WC	9th	7	3	1	4	6
Junior totals				10	1	1	2	16
Senior totals				32	7	5	12	57

== Awards and honors ==
Award	Year
Liiga
Champion	2021
