= Blake Lizotte =

American ice hockey player (born 1997)

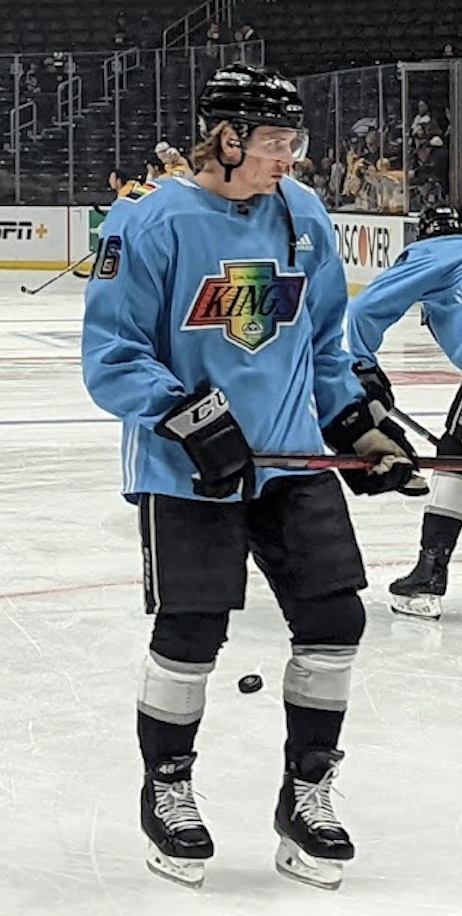
- Lizotte with the Los Angeles Kings in 2022
- Born: December 13, 1997 (age 28) Lindstrom, Minnesota, U.S.
- Height: 5 ft 9 in (175 cm)
- Weight: 176 lb (80 kg; 12 st 8 lb)
- Position: Forward
- Shoots: Left
- NHL team Former teams: Pittsburgh Penguins; Los Angeles Kings
- NHL draft: Undrafted
- Playing career: 2019–present

Blake Joseph Lizotte (born December 13, 1997) is an American professional ice hockey player who is a forward for the Pittsburgh Penguins of the National Hockey League (NHL). He previously played for the Los Angeles Kings.

== Playing career ==
After going undrafted out of high school, Lizotte played in the United States Hockey League (USHL) for the Fargo Force from the 2015–16 season to the 2016–17 season. He then committed to play collegiate hockey at St. Cloud State University of the National Collegiate Hockey Conference (NCHC).

In two seasons he helped lead the Huskies to the National Collegiate Hockey Conference (NCHC) regular-season championship in both years and helped secure the top overall seed in the NCAA Tournament. In his sophomore season in 2018–19, Lizotte ranked second on his team in points, tied for first in assists and fourth in goals. He was named to the NCHC First All-Star Team. Over the course of his two seasons in St. Cloud he tallied 69 points 76 games.

After suffering a second consecutive early exit with the Huskies at the NCAA Tournament, Lizotte agreed to a three-year, entry-level contract with the Los Angeles Kings on April 2, 2019. He immediately joined the Kings to conclude the 2018–19 season, making his debut in the Kings' season finale, a 5–2 victory over the Vegas Golden Knights on April 6, 2019. Lizotte scored his first career NHL goal and added an assist in a 3–2 loss to the Montreal Canadiens on November 9, 2019.

After scoring 10 points and leading the Kings in plus-minus rating during the 2020-21 season, Lizotte agreed to a one-year, $800,000 contract extension with the Kings on June 24, 2021. He re-signed a two-year contract extension with an average annual value of $1.675 million with the Kings on March 21, 2022.

On July 1, 2024, Lizotte signed a two-year contract, worth an average $1.85 million annually, with the Pittsburgh Penguins. He was injured in a preseason game against the Ottawa Senators on September 29; Penguins defenseman Kris Letang accidentally cleared the puck into his team's bench, and Lizotte was struck in the face. He sustained a concussion and missed a month of action, making his Penguins debut against the Anaheim Ducks on October 31.

== Personal life ==
Lizotte grew up in Lindstrom, Minnesota. His father, aged 45, died when Blake was 14 from complications of epilepsy, leaving his mother to raise him and his two brothers on her own.

Lizotte married his wife, Abby Skaalerud, in 2021. Their son was born in February 2026.

Lizotte is a Christian.

== Career statistics ==
			Regular season					Playoffs
Season	Team	League	GP	G	A	Pts	PIM	GP	G	A	Pts	PIM
2012–13	Chisago Lakes High	USHS	25	8	19	27	4	3	1	0	1	0
2013–14	Chisago Lakes High	USHS	25	11	29	40	0	3	3	5	8	0
2014–15	Minot Minotauros	NAHL	56	14	38	52	14	6	0	3	3	4
2015–16	Fargo Force	USHL	54	12	34	46	26	—	—	—	—	—
2016–17	Fargo Force	USHL	56	19	46	65	42	3	0	0	0	0
2017–18	St. Cloud State	NCHC	39	8	19	27	20	—	—	—	—	—
2018–19	St. Cloud State	NCHC	37	14	28	42	28	—	—	—	—	—
2018–19	Los Angeles Kings	NHL	1	0	0	0	0	—	—	—	—	—
2019–20	Los Angeles Kings	NHL	65	6	17	23	20	—	—	—	—	—
2019–20	Ontario Reign	AHL	1	0	0	0	2	—	—	—	—	—
2020–21	Los Angeles Kings	NHL	41	3	7	10	16	—	—	—	—	—
2021–22	Los Angeles Kings	NHL	70	10	14	24	28	7	0	1	1	16
2022–23	Los Angeles Kings	NHL	81	11	23	34	70	3	0	0	0	2
2023–24	Los Angeles Kings	NHL	62	7	8	15	20	5	1	0	1	2
2024–25	Pittsburgh Penguins	NHL	59	11	9	20	26	—	—	—	—	—
2025–26	Pittsburgh Penguins	NHL	55	7	12	19	25	6	0	2	2	2
NHL totals			434	55	90	145	205	21	1	3	4	22

== Awards and honors ==
Award	Year	Ref
NAHL
All-Central Rookie Team	2015	
All-Central Team	2015	
First All-Rookie Team	2015	
Rookie of the Year	2015	
USHL
Second All-Star Team	2017	
College
NCHC All-Rookie Team	2018	
NCHC All-Academic Team	2018	
NCHC Scholar Athlete	2018	
All-NCHC First Team	2019	
AHCA West Second Team All-American	2019	
