= Aleš Stezka =

Czech ice hockey player (born 1997)

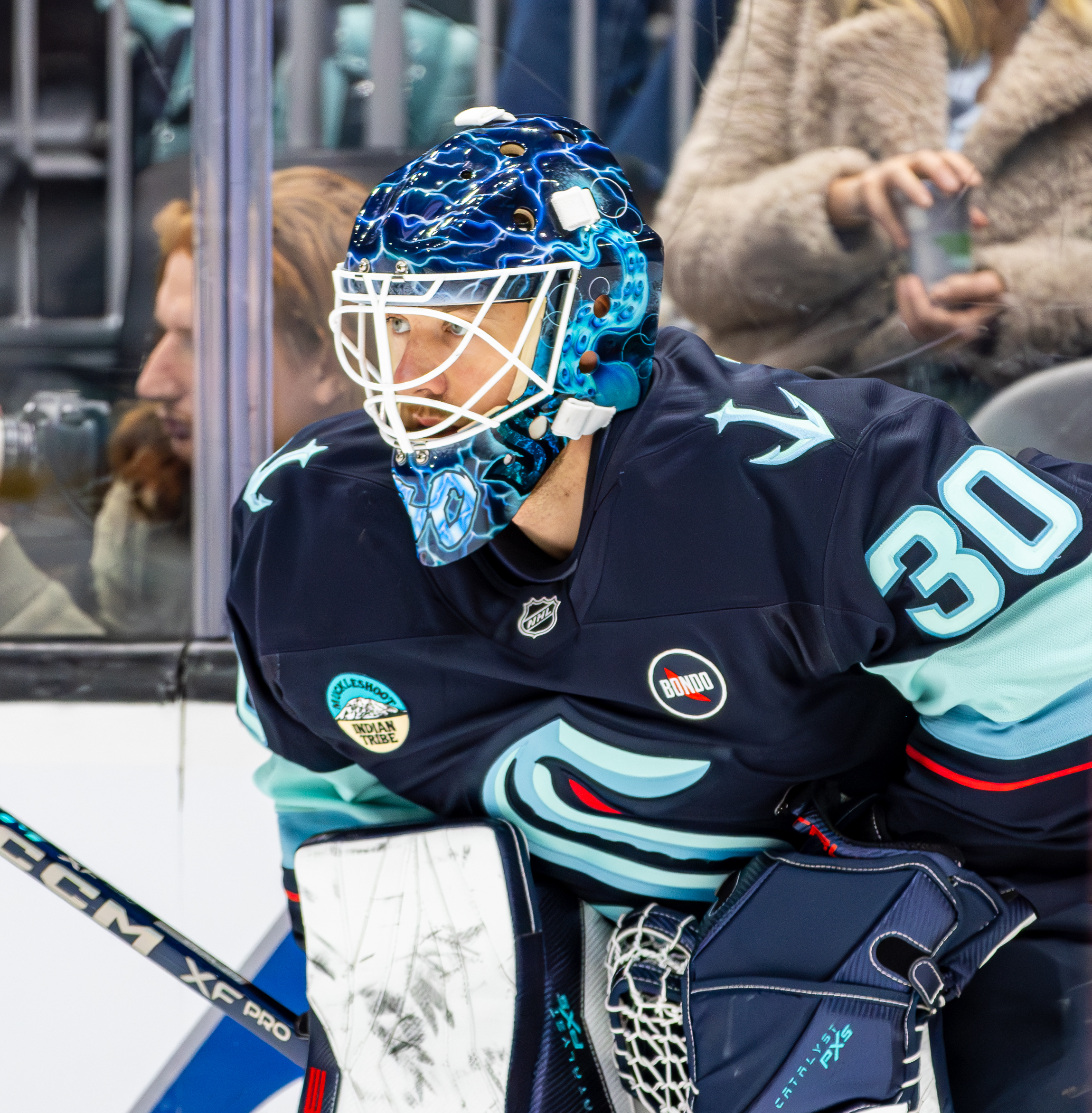
- Stezka with the Seattle Kraken in 2024
- Born: January 6, 1997 (age 29) Plzeň, Czech Republic
- Height: 193 cm (6 ft 4 in)
- Weight: 91 kg (201 lb; 14 st 5 lb)
- Position: Goaltender
- Catches: Left
- ELH team Former teams: HC Kometa Brno; Bílí Tygři Liberec; HC Vítkovice; Seattle Kraken
- NHL draft: 111th overall, 2015; Minnesota Wild
- Playing career: 2017–present

Aleš Stezka (born 6 January 1997) is a Czech professional ice hockey goaltender for HC Kometa Brno of the Czech Extraliga (ELH). He was drafted 111th overall by the Minnesota Wild in 2015.

== Playing career ==
Stezka played junior hockey with the regional Czech team HC Meteor Třemošná. He would join the Bílí Tygři Liberec of the Czech Extraliga in 2010.

In the 2015 NHL entry draft, Stezka was selected in the fourth round (111th overall) by the Minnesota Wild. However, he would spend the 2015–16 season with the Sioux Falls Stampede and the 2016–17 season with the Chicago Steel, both of the United States Hockey League (USHL).

For the 2017–18 season, Stezka returned to the Czech Republic, once again playing for Liberec, where he formed a goaltending tandem with Roman Will. During the season, he played only two games with Liberec and another 27 after being loaned to HC Benátky nad Jizerou of the 2nd Czech Republic Hockey League, where he alternated in goal with Josef Kořenář.

Stezka spent the 2018–19 season on loan to Piráti Chomutov of the Extraliga and HC Slovan Ústí nad Labem of the 2nd Czech Republic Hockey League. He would then spend the following two seasons playing for AZ Havířov. He then started playing for HC Vítkovice Ridera, where he would spend two seasons. At the end of the 2022–23 season, writers for the Czech newspaper Právo honored him when they chose him as the Extraliga's best goaltender.

Following the 2022–23 season, Stezka went back to North America, where he signed a one-year, entry-level contract with the Seattle Kraken of the National Hockey League (NHL), taking effect in the 2023–24 season. Before the season, he participated in the Kraken's training camp, and was then sent down to the Kraken's American Hockey League (AHL) affiliate, the Coachella Valley Firebirds. He made his NHL debut for Seattle against the Tampa Bay Lightning on February 23, 2025.

After his lone appearance with the Kraken in the 2024–25 season, Stezka opted to return to his native Czech Republic as a free agent to sign a three-year contract with reigning champions, HC Kometa Brno of the ELH, on 18 June 2025.

== International play ==
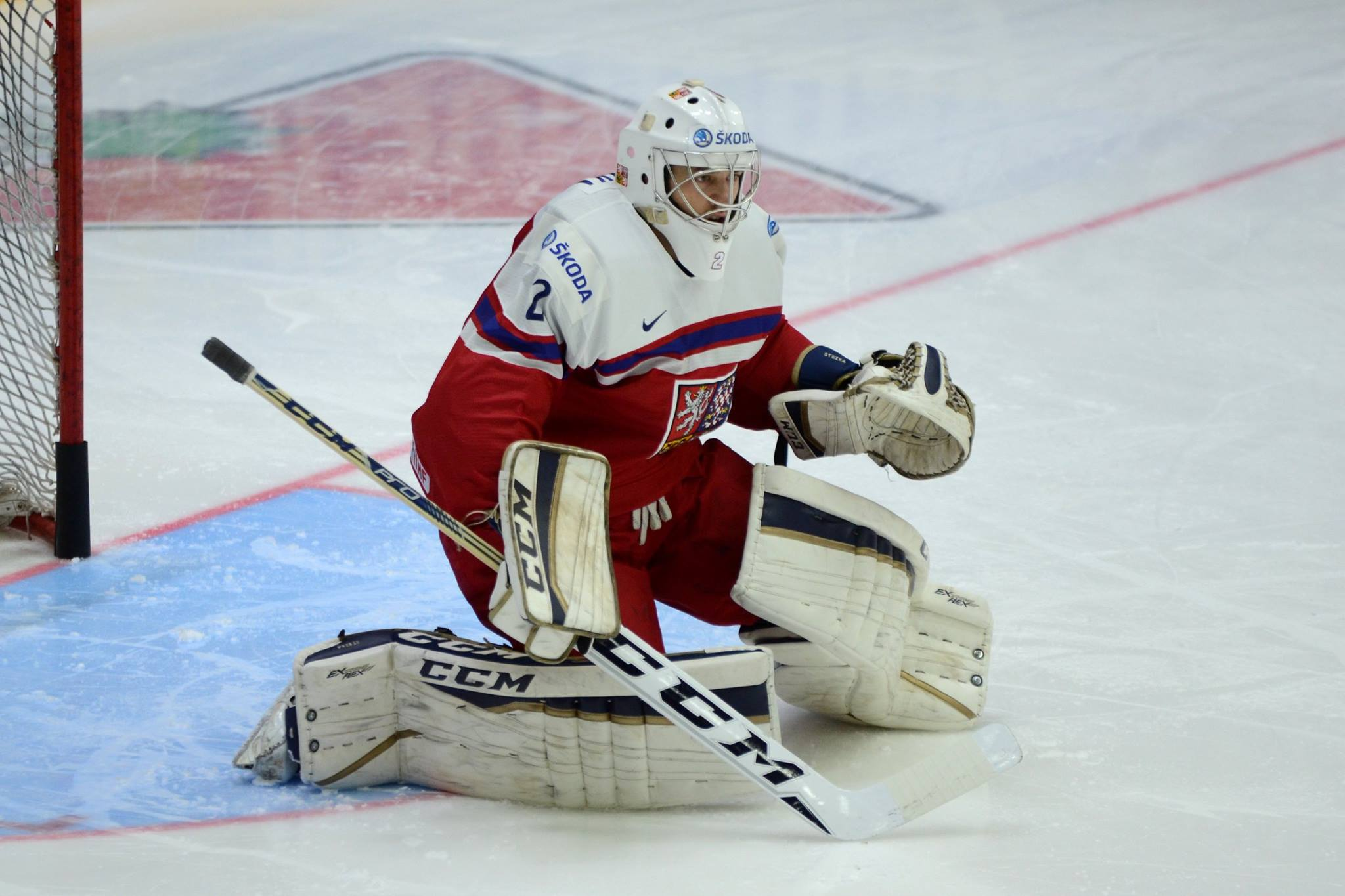
Stezka with the Czech Republic during the 2016 IIHF World Junior Championships.

Stezka played with the Czech Republic during the 2015 IIHF World U18 Championships. The Czech Republic was eliminated in a 3–2 loss to Canada, in which Stezka made 22 saves. The next year, he played with the Czech Republic in the 2016 World Junior Championships.

== Career statistics ==
=== Regular season and playoffs ===
			Regular season									Playoffs
Season	Team	League	GP	W	L	OTL	MIN	GA	SO	GAA	SV%	GP	W	L	MIN	GA	SO	GAA	SV%
2015–16	Sioux Falls Stampede	USHL	19	6	10	1	1014	56	1	3.32	.893	—	—	—	—	—	—	—	—
2016–17	Chicago Steel	USHL	37	22	10	3	2154	82	4	2.28	.916	13	9	4	796	27	3	2.04	.812
2017–18	HC Bílí Tygři Liberec	ELH	2	0	2	0	100	7	0	4.20	.868	—	—	—	—	—	—	—	—
2017-18	HC Benátky nad Jizerou	CZE.2	27	5	22	0	1397	113	0	4.85	.858	—	—	—	—	—	—	—	—
2018–19	Piráti Chomutov	ELH	5	0	5	0	235	15	0	3.83	.883	—	—	—	—	—	—	—	—
2018–19	HC Slovan Ústí nad Labem	CZE.2	28	8	20	0	1641	103	1	3.77	.903	—	—	—	—	—	—	—	—
2019–20	AZ Havířov	CZE.2	50	28	21	0	2928	125	4	2.56	.909	—	—	—	—	—	—	—	—
2020–21	AZ Havířov	CZE.2	20	8	11	0	1184	50	1	2.53	.914	—	—	—	—	—	—	—	—
2021–22	HC Vítkovice Ridera	ELH	46	24	21	0	2736	116	1	2.54	.910	8	3	5	491	18	0	2.20	.923
2022–23	HC Vítkovice Ridera	ELH	39	25	14	0	2382	85	5	2.14	.924	12	6	6	874	18	2	1.24	.960
2023–24	Coachella Valley Firebirds	AHL	27	18	6	2	1547	64	2	2.48	.914	—	—	—	—	—	—	—	—
2024–25	Coachella Valley Firebirds	AHL	26	9	12	5	1525	78	0	3.07	.899	—	—	—	—	—	—	—	—
2024–25	Seattle Kraken	NHL	1	0	1	0	58	3	0	3.09	.870	—	—	—	—	—	—	—	—
ELH totals			92	49	42	0	5,453	223	6	2.45	.896	20	9	11	1,365	36	2	1.72	.942
NHL totals			1	0	1	0	58	3	0	3.09	.870	—	—	—	—	—	—	—	—

=== International ===
Year	Team	Event	Result	GP	W	L	OT	MIN	GA	SO	GAA	SV%
2015	Czech Republic	U18	6th	2	0	1	0	105	6	0	3.46	.908
2016	Czech Republic	WJC	5th	1	0	0	0	40	5	0	7.50	.800
Junior totals				3	0	1	0	145	11	0	5.48	.854
