= Marc Johnstone =

American ice hockey player (born 1996)

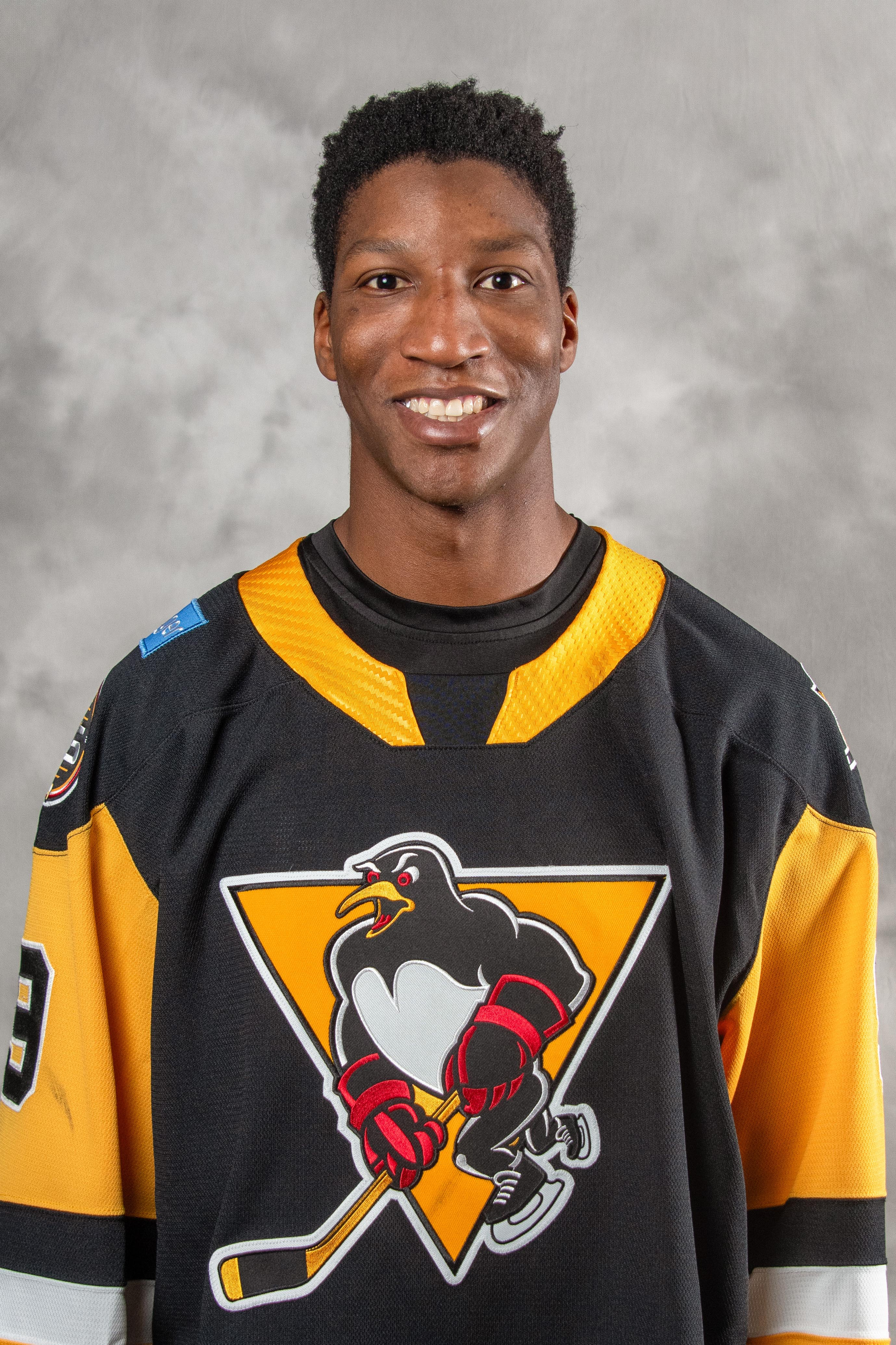
- Johnstone in 2023
- Born: June 19, 1996 (age 30) Cranford, New Jersey, U.S.
- Height: 6 ft 0 in (183 cm)
- Weight: 181 lb (82 kg; 12 st 13 lb)
- Position: Forward
- Shoots: Right
- AHL team Former teams: Toronto Marlies; Pittsburgh Penguins
- NHL draft: Undrafted
- Playing career: 2021–present

Marc Johnstone (born June 19, 1996) is an American professional ice hockey forward who is currently playing for the Toronto Marlies of the American Hockey League (AHL).

== Early life ==
Johnstone was born on June 19, 1996, in Cranford, New Jersey to parents Thomas and Robin. He began playing at age five in the Cranford Hockey Club. He then went on to play AAA hockey with the New Jersey Rockets and North Jersey Avalanche organizations. Johnstone would play youth and high school hockey at St. Joseph High School in his home state of New Jersey.

== Playing career ==
After competing in four seasons at Sacred Heart University, Johnstone signed a contract with the South Carolina Stingrays of the ECHL on March 25, 2021. Johnstone would finish out the season, playing in five game with the Stingrays.

On September 2, 2021, the Newfoundland Growlers of the ECHL signed Johnstone to a standard, one-year contract. Johnstone also appeared in four games with the Growlers' AHL affiliate, the Toronto Marlies, of the American Hockey League (AHL).

On June 19, 2022, the Marlies signed Johnstone to a standard, one-year contract. Johnston spent the entirety of the season with the Marlies, playing 69 of 72 possible regular season games, whilst appearing in all seven of the Marlies' postseason games.

On July 2, 2023, the Pittsburgh Penguins of the National Hockey League (NHL) signed Johnstone to a two-year, entry-level contract. On December 8, 2023, Johnstone made his NHL debut with the Penguins.

After two seasons within the Penguins organization, Johnstone left as a free agent and returned to the Toronto Marlies on a two-year AHL contract on July 7, 2025.

== Career statistics ==
			Regular season					Playoffs
Season	Team	League	GP	G	A	Pts	PIM	GP	G	A	Pts	PIM
2013–14	Kenai River Brown Bears	NAHL	2	0	0	0	2	—	—	—	—	—
2014–15	Kenai River Brown Bears	NAHL	2	0	1	1	0	—	—	—	—	—
2015–16	Chicago Steel	USHL	57	6	7	13	84	—	—	—	—	—
2016–17	Chicago Steel	USHL	59	9	20	29	81	14	3	12	15	6
2017–18	Sacred Heart University	NCAA	39	13	17	30	42	—	—	—	—	—
2018–19	Sacred Heart University	NCAA	37	5	17	22	34	—	—	—	—	—
2019–20	Sacred Heart University	NCAA	34	9	18	27	14	—	—	—	—	—
2020–21	Sacred Heart University	NCAA	16	6	10	16	12	—	—	—	—	—
2020–21	South Carolina Stingrays	ECHL	5	0	2	2	4	—	—	—	—	—
2021–22	Toronto Marlies	AHL	4	0	0	0	2	—	—	—	—	—
2021–22	Newfoundland Growlers	ECHL	58	7	14	21	33	19	4	4	8	14
2022–23	Toronto Marlies	AHL	69	9	13	22	39	7	0	1	1	6
2023–24	Wilkes-Barre/Scranton Penguins	AHL	41	3	6	9	29	1	0	0	0	0
2023–24	Pittsburgh Penguins	NHL	1	0	0	0	0	—	—	—	—	—
2024–25	Wilkes-Barre/Scranton Penguins	AHL	51	5	6	11	37	—	—	—	—	—
2025–26	Toronto Marlies	AHL	57	9	17	26	52	20	1	3	4	34
NHL totals			1	0	0	0	0	—	—	—	—	—

== Awards and honors ==
Award	Year
AHL
Calder Cup champion	2026
