= 2016–17 USHL season =

2016–17 USHL Season
- League: United States Hockey League
- Sport: Ice hockey
- Duration: September 23, 2016 – April 8, 2017
- Games: 60
- Teams: 17

Draft
- Top draft pick: Matt Hellickson
- Picked by: Sioux City Musketeers

Regular season
- Anderson Cup: Sioux City Musketeers
- Season MVP: Matīss Kivlenieks (Sioux City Musketeers)
- Top scorer: Zach Solow (Dubuque Fighting Saints)

Clark Cup Playoffs
- Clark Cup Playoffs MVP: Eduards Tralmaks (Steel)
- Finals champions: Chicago Steel
- Runners-up: Sioux City Musketeers

USHL seasons
- 2015–16 2017–18

The 2016–17 USHL season is the 38th season of the United States Hockey League as an all-junior league. The regular season ran from September 23, 2016, to April 8, 2017. The regular season champions, the Sioux City Musketeers, were awarded the Anderson Cup. The playoff champions, the Chicago Steel, were awarded the Clark Cup.

== Regular season ==
Final standings

=== Eastern Conference ===
Team	GP	W	L	OTL	SOL	PTS	GF	GA	PIM
y – Chicago Steel	60	38	17	2	3	81	196	144	748
x – Dubuque Fighting Saints	60	36	17	5	2	79	201	163	1038
x – Muskegon Lumberjacks	60	37	18	3	2	79	192	157	1021
x – Youngstown Phantoms	60	34	20	5	1	74	161	135	1054
Green Bay Gamblers	60	34	22	2	2	72	173	145	900
Bloomington Thunder	60	25	27	5	3	58	150	177	1012
Madison Capitols	60	23	32	1	4	51	135	192	851
Team USA	60	23	34	1	2	49	164	214	819
Cedar Rapids RoughRiders	60	12	44	3	1	28	109	228	931

=== Western Conference ===
Team	GP	W	L	OTL	SOL	PTS	GF	GA	PIM
z – Sioux City Musketeers	60	40	13	5	2	87	179	125	787
x – Waterloo Black Hawks	60	40	16	2	2	84	210	161	891
x – Fargo Force	60	36	19	4	1	77	193	149	792
x – Des Moines Buccaneers	60	36	20	1	3	76	177	154	797
Lincoln Stars	60	32	22	5	1	70	171	161	1147
Omaha Lancers	60	22	31	5	2	51	159	214	1246
Sioux Falls Stampede	60	21	30	3	6	51	169	193	902
Tri-City Storm	60	21	31	6	2	50	153	180	714

x = clinched playoff berth; y = clinched conference title; z = clinched regular season title

== Statistical leaders ==
=== Scoring leaders ===
Players are listed by points, then goals.

Note: GP = Games played; G = Goals; A = Assists; Pts. = Points; PIM = Penalty minutes

Player	Team	GP	G	A	Pts	PIM
Zach Solow	Dubuque Fighting Saints	56	18	51	69	42
Blake Lizotte	Fargo Force	56	19	46	65	42
Colin Theisen	Dubuque Fighting Saints	57	35	27	62	30
Hank Crone	Fargo Force	56	24	38	62	72
Jack Adams	Fargo Force	56	37	23	60	55
Andrei Svechnikov	Muskegon Lumberjacks	48	29	29	58	68
Alex Limoges	Tri-City/Waterloo	55	22	34	56	18
Eeli Tolvanen	Sioux City Musketeers	52	30	24	54	26
Cole Guttman	Dubuque Fighting Saints	53	27	27	54	18
Nick Swaney	Waterloo Black Hawks	47	26	25	51	12
Collin Adams	Muskegon Lumberjacks	57	24	27	51	72

=== Leading goaltenders ===
These are the goaltenders that lead the league in GAA that have played at least 1380 minutes.

Note: GP = Games played; Mins = Minutes played; W = Wins; L = Losses; OTL = Overtime losses; SOL = Shootout losses; SO = Shutouts; GAA = Goals against average; SV% = Save percentage

Player	Team	GP	Mins	W	L	OTL	SOL	SO	GAA	SV%
Matīss Kivlenieks	Sioux City Musketeers	49	2991	36	7	4	2	5	1.85	0.932
Ivan Kulbakov	Youngstown Phantoms	52	3050	30	16	4	1	5	1.93	0.919
Robbie Beydoun	Waterloo Black Hawks	39	2270	24	9	2	2	5	2.22	0.919
Josef Kořenář	Lincoln Stars	32	1783	14	11	4	0	2	2.22	0.923
Dávid Hrenák	Green Bay Gamblers	33	1878	15	14	1	1	4	2.24	0.913

== Post season awards ==
=== USHL awards ===
Award	Name	Team
Player of the Year	Matīss Kivlenieks	Sioux City Musketeers
Forward of the Year	Zach Solow	Dubuque Fighting Saints
Defenseman of the Year	Connor Mackey	Green Bay Gamblers
Rookie of the Year	Andrei Svechnikov	Muskegon Lumberjacks
Goaltender of the Year	Matiss Kivlenieks	Sioux City Musketeers
Coach of the Year	Jay Varady	Sioux City Musketeers
Scholar-Athlete	Michael Karow; Graham Lillibridge	Youngstown Phantoms; Chicago Steel
Curt Hammer	Logan Halladay; Riese Zmolek	Bloomington Thunder; Cedar Rapids RoughRiders
General Manager of the Year	Mark LeRose	Sioux City Musketeers
Executive of the Year	Not awarded	
Organization of the Year	Not awarded	

=== All-USHL First Team ===
Pos	Name	Team
G	Matīss Kivlenieks	Sioux City
D	Mario Ferraro	Des Moines
D	Connor Mackey	Green Bay
F	Zach Solow	Dubuque
F	Andrei Svechnikov	Muskegon
F	Eeli Tolvanen	Sioux City

=== All-USHL Second Team ===
Pos	Name	Team
G	Ivan Kulbakov	Youngstown
D	Mikey Anderson	Waterloo
D	Quinn Hughes	Team USA
F	Jack Adams	Fargo
F	Blake Lizotte	Fargo
F	Nick Swaney	Waterloo

=== All-USHL Third Team ===
Pos	Name	Team
G	Robbie Beydoun	Waterloo
D	Bo Hanson	Muskegon
D	Wyatt Kalynuk	Bloomington
F	Colin Theisen	Dubuque
F	Shane Bowers	Waterloo
F	Linus Weissbach	Tri-City

=== All Rookie Team ===
Pos	Name	Team
G	Keith Petruzzelli	Muskegon
D	Mario Ferraro	Des Moines
D	Clayton Phillips	Fargo
F	Cole Guttman	Dubuque
F	Isaac Johnson	Des Moines
F	Andrei Svechnikov	Muskegon

== Clark Cup playoffs ==
Conference Semi-Finals (Best of 5)
1	Chicago	3
4	Youngstown	2
Eastern Conference
2	Dubuque	3
3	Muskegon	1
1	Sioux City	3
4	Des Moines	0
Western Conference
2	Waterloo	3
3	Fargo	0

Conference Finals (Best of 5)
1	Chicago	3
2	Dubuque	1
1	Sioux City	3
2	Waterloo	2

Clark Cup Championship (Best of 5)
E1	Chicago	3
W1	Sioux City	2

== Conference Semifinals ==
=== Eastern Conference ===
==== (1) Chicago Steel vs. (4) Youngstown Phantoms ====
April 14	Chicago Steel	4 – 1	Youngstown Phantoms	Fox Valley Ice Arena
14:19 - Baker Shore (1)		First period	No scoring
16:50 - Mitch Lewandowski (1)		Second period	No scoring
12:20 - Reggie Lutz (1); 18:32 - en - Marc Johnstone (1)		Third period	Max Ellis (1) - 16:49
Aleš Stezka (25 saves / 26 shots)		Goalie stats	Ivan Kulbakov (33 saves / 36 shots)

April 15	Chicago Steel	6 – 0	Youngstown Phantoms	Fox Valley Ice Arena
6:05 - pp - Reggie Lutz (2); 7:56 - pp - Reggie Lutz (3)		First period	No scoring
0:16 - sh - Jack Badini (1); 12:40 - Mitch Lewandowski (2); 16:08 - pp - Jack Badini (2)		Second period	No scoring
5:09 - pp - Eduards Tralmaks (1)		Third period	No scoring
Aleš Stezka (40 saves / 40 shots)		Goalie stats	Ivan Kulbakov (12 saves / 17 shots); Britt League (5 saves / 6 shots)

April 21	Youngstown Phantoms	4 – 1	Chicago Steel	Covelli Centre
7:41 - Michael Karow (1)		First period	No scoring
6:10 - Marshall Moise (1); 9:23 - sh - Tommy Apap (1)		Second period	Eduards Tralmaks (2) - 1:49
7:17 - Brandon Estes (1)		Third period	No scoring
Ivan Kulbakov (23 saves / 24 shots)		Goalie stats	Aleš Stezka (23 saves / 27 shots)

April 22	Youngstown Phantoms	3 – 2	Chicago Steel	Covelli Centre
14:56 - Austin Pooley (1)		First period	No scoring
1:00 - Coale Norris (1)		Second period	No scoring
12:33 - Evan Wisocky (1)		Third period	Marc Johnstone (2) - 10:04; Eduards Tralmaks (3) - 13:23
Ivan Kulbakov (16 saves / 18 shots)		Goalie stats	Aleš Stezka (27 saves / 30 shots)

April 25	Chicago Steel	2 – 0	Youngstown Phantoms	Fox Valley Ice Arena
No scoring		First period	No scoring
11:50 - Jack Badini (3)		Second period	No scoring
17:09 - en - Derek Daschke (1)		Third period	No scoring
Aleš Stezka (40 saves / 40 shots)		Goalie stats	Ivan Kulbakov (25 saves / 26 shots)

Chicago wins series 3 – 2

==== (2) Dubuque Fighting Saints vs. (3) Muskegon Lumberjacks ====
April 14	Dubuque Fighting Saints	4 – 3	OT	Muskegon Lumberjacks	Mystique Ice Center
10:17 - Dallas Gerads (1)		First period		Collin Adams (1) - pp - 7:27; Collin Adams (2) - 13:13
10:42 - pp - Austin Rueschhoff (1)		Second period		No scoring
4:55 - Quinn Preston (1)		Third period		Bo Hanson (1) - 18:15
14:46 - Colin Theisen (1)		First overtime period		No scoring
Jaxon Castor (25 saves / 28 shots)		Goalie stats		Keith Petruzzelli (27 saves / 31 shots)

April 15	Dubuque Fighting Saints	3 – 0	Muskegon Lumberjacks	Mystique Ice Center
No scoring		First period	No scoring
3:12 - Dallas Gerads (2); 5:36 - pp - Austin Rueschhoff (2)		Second period	No scoring
19:17 - en - Keenan Suthers (1)		Third period	No scoring
Jaxon Castor (36 saves / 36 shots)		Goalie stats	Keith Petruzzelli (19 saves / 21 shots)

April 20	Muskegon Lumberjacks	3 – 0	Dubuque Fighting Saints	L.C. Walker Arena
10:57 - Collin Adams (3)		First period	No scoring
1:41 - pp - Marc Del Gaizo (1)		Second period	No scoring
16:35 - en - Ty Farmer (1)		Third period	No scoring
Adam Brízgala (33 saves / 33 shots)		Goalie stats	Jaxon Castor (31 saves / 33 shots)

April 21	Muskegon Lumberjacks	2 – 7	Dubuque Fighting Saints	L.C. Walker Arena
No scoring		First period	Patrick Kudla (1) - 3:40; Cole Guttman (1) - pp - 19:47
8:20 - pp - Austin Alger (1)		Second period	Jacob Hamacher (1) - 0:09
13:38 - Will Smith (1)		Third period	Quinn Preston (2) - pp - 7:05; Jacob Hamacher (2) - 8:11; Michael Boyle (1) - 17:14; Alex Steeves (1) - 17:31
Adam Brízgala (34 saves / 41 shots)		Goalie stats	Jaxon Castor (27 saves / 29 shots)

Dubuque wins series 3 – 1

=== Western Conference ===
==== (1) Sioux City Musketeers vs. (4) Des Moines Buccaneers ====
April 14	Sioux City Musketeers	4 – 1	Des Moines Buccaneers	Tyson Events Center
14:14 - John Carter MacLean (1)		First period	No scoring
1:51 - Charlie Kelleher (1); 13:41 - Charlie Kelleher (2)		Second period	No scoring
13:30 - pp - Eeli Tolvanen (1)		Third period	Collin Rutherford (1) - 1:05
Matīss Kivlenieks (21 saves / 22 shots)		Goalie stats	Jan Růžička (36 saves / 39 shots); Nick MacNab (10 saves / 11 shots)

April 16	Sioux City Musketeers	5 – 0	Des Moines Buccaneers	Tyson Events Center
3:46 - Brady Ferner (1); 13:11 - Carson Vance (1)		First period	No scoring
14:47 - Odeen Tufto (1)		Second period	No scoring
7:33 - pp - Kristián Pospíšil (1); 11:31 - Jackson Keane (1)		Third period	No scoring
Matīss Kivlenieks (23 saves / 23 shots)		Goalie stats	Jan Růžička (29 saves / 34 shots)

April 21	Des Moines Buccaneers	1 – 2	Sioux City Musketeers	Buccaneer Arena
No scoring		First period	No scoring
1:29 - Colin Ugbekile (1)		Second period	Charlie Kelleher (3) - 5:16
No scoring		Third period	Kristián Pospíšil (2) - pp - 9:14
Jan Růžička (30 saves / 32 shots)		Goalie stats	Matīss Kivlenieks (27 saves / 28 shots)

Sioux City wins series 3 – 0

==== (2) Waterloo Black Hawks vs. (3) Fargo Force ====
April 14	Waterloo Black Hawks	4 – 3	OT	Fargo Force	Young Arena
15:35 - Nick Swaney (1)		First period		Shane McMahan (1) - 13:21
No scoring		Second period		Carson Musser (1) - 13:02
8:04 - pp - Mikey Anderson (1); 15:57 - pp - Kevin Charyszyn (1)		Third period		Mitchell Chaffee (1) - 5:00
4:51 - Bailey Conger (1)		First overtime period		No scoring
Robbie Beydoun (19 saves / 22 shots)		Goalie stats		Matt Murray (13 saves / 14 shots); Ryan Bischel (27 saves / 30 shots)

April 15	Waterloo Black Hawks	4 – 1	Fargo Force	Young Arena
11:48 - pp - Dylan Samberg (1)		First period	No scoring
12:34 - Ethan Johnson (1)		Second period	No scoring
18:22 - en - Mikey Anderson (2); 19:37 - en - Shane Bowers (1)		Third period	Shane McMahan (2) - 6:58
Robbie Beydoun (30 saves / 31 shots)		Goalie stats	Ryan Bischel (31 saves / 33 shots)

April 18	Fargo Force	0 – 3	Waterloo Black Hawks	Scheels Arena
No scoring		First period	Jackson Cates (1) - 14:28
No scoring		Second period	No scoring
No scoring		Third period	Shane Bowers (2) - 1:20; Bailey Conger (2) - sh - en - 18:39
Ryan Bischel (37 saves / 39 shots)		Goalie stats	Robbie Beydoun (24 saves / 24 shots)

Waterloo wins series 3 – 0

== Conference Finals ==
=== Eastern Conference ===
==== (1) Chicago Steel vs. (2) Dubuque Fighting Saints ====
April 28	Chicago Steel	4 – 3	Dubuque Fighting Saints	Fox Valley Ice Arena
No scoring		First period	No scoring
8:20 - Reggie Lutz (4)		Second period	Quinn Preston (3) - 11:44
8:27 - pp - Jack Badini (4); 9:05 - Brannon McManus (1); 15:39 - Brannon McManus (2)		Third period	Eric MacAdams (1) - 0:42; Scott Corbett (1) - 7:39
Aleš Stezka (23 saves / 26 shots)		Goalie stats	Jaxon Castor (29 saves / 33 shots)

April 29	Chicago Steel	1 – 3	Dubuque Fighting Saints	Fox Valley Ice Arena
No scoring		First period	No scoring
No scoring		Second period	Veli-Matti Tiuraniemi (1) - 10:52; Patrick Kudla (2) - pp - 18:05
13:40 - Eduards Tralmaks (4)		Third period	Austin Rueschhoff (3) - 12:45
Aleš Stezka (29 saves / 32 shots)		Goalie stats	Jaxon Castor (34 saves / 35 shots)

May 5	Dubuque Fighting Saints	3 – 4	Chicago Steel	Mystique Ice Center
No scoring		First period	No scoring
7:46 - Zach Solow (1); 11:46 - Colin Theisen (2); 13:32 - pp - Patrick Kudla (3)		Second period	Marc Johnstone (3) - 0:38
No scoring		Third period	Eduards Tralmaks (5) - 7:21; Jake Jaremko (1) - 12:09; Brannon McManus (3) - 16:49
Jaxon Castor (24 saves / 28 shots)		Goalie stats	Aleš Stezka (25 saves / 28 shots)

May 6	Dubuque Fighting Saints	3 – 7	Chicago Steel	Mystique Ice Center
No scoring		First period	Eduards Tralmaks (6) - 9:53; Jack Badini (5) - sh - 11:11
5:18 - Dallas Gerads (3); 13:01 - Michael Boyle (2)		Second period	Reggie Lutz (5) - pp - 6:19; Baker Shore (2) - 18:00; Brannon McManus (4) - 19:00
9:24 - pp - Austin Rueschhoff (4)		Third period	Eduards Tralmaks (7) - 4:18; Jake Jaremko (2) - en - 10:40
Jaxon Castor (27 saves / 33 shots)		Goalie stats	Aleš Stezka (28 saves / 31 shots)

Chicago wins series 3 – 1

=== Western Conference ===
==== (1) Sioux City Musketeers vs. (2) Waterloo Black Hawks ====
April 28	Sioux City Musketeers	5 – 2	Waterloo Black Hawks	Tyson Events Center
4:07 - Connor Ford (1); 15:26 - pp - Eeli Tolvanen (2)		First period	No scoring
11:24 - Eeli Tolvanen (3)		Second period	Ben Copeland (1) - 16:49; Ben Copeland (2) - 17:39
9:03 - sh - Odeen Tufto (2); 18:30 - en - Tarek Baker (1)		Third period	No scoring
Matīss Kivlenieks (31 saves / 33 shots)		Goalie stats	Robbie Beydoun (24 saves / 28 shots)

April 30	Sioux City Musketeers	1 – 2	OT	Waterloo Black Hawks	Tyson Events Center
3:52 - pp - Jacob Wilson (1)		First period		Alex Limoges (1) - 8:37
No scoring		Second period		No scoring
No scoring		Third period		No scoring
No scoring		First overtime period		Yuki Miura (1) - 6:47
Matīss Kivlenieks (33 saves / 35 shots)		Goalie stats		Robbie Beydoun (30 saves / 31 shots)

May 5	Waterloo Black Hawks	0 – 3	Sioux City Musketeers	Young Arena
No scoring		First period	No scoring
No scoring		Second period	Tarek Baker (2) - pp - 5:28; Matt Hellickson (1) - 19:38
No scoring		Third period	Odeen Tufto (3) - en - 19:23
Robbie Beydoun (25 saves / 27 shots)		Goalie stats	Matīss Kivlenieks (29 saves / 29 shots)

May 6	Waterloo Black Hawks	3 – 1	Sioux City Musketeers	Young Arena
8:05 - pp - Ethan Spaxman (1); 19:27 - Bailey Conger (3)		First period	Kristián Pospíšil (3) - pp - 13:19
19:26 - pp - Jackson Cates (2)		Second period	No scoring
No scoring		Third period	No scoring
Robbie Beydoun (28 saves / 29 shots); Peter Thome (0 saves / 0 shots)		Goalie stats	Matīss Kivlenieks (31 saves / 34 shots)

May 9	Sioux City Musketeers	8 – 3	Waterloo Black Hawks	Tyson Events Center
4:59 - Tarek Baker (3); 13:21 - Jacob Wilson (2); 16:20 - Micah Miller (1)		First period	No scoring
2:15 - Phillip Knies (1); 12:07 - Kristián Pospíšil (4)		Second period	Bailey Conger (4) - pp - 16:52; Grant Gabriele (1) - 17:27
13:43 - Odeen Tufto (4); 15:36 - sh - Brian Rigali (1); 16:53 - en - Eeli Tolvanen (4)		Third period	Ben Copeland (3) - 1:51
Matīss Kivlenieks (32 saves / 35 shots)		Goalie stats	Robbie Beydoun (8 saves / 12 shots); Peter Thome (12 saves / 15 shots)

Sioux City wins series 3 – 2

== Clark Cup Finals ==
=== (W1) Sioux City Musketeers vs. (E1) Chicago Steel ===
May 12	Sioux City Musketeers	5 – 4	OT	Chicago Steel	Tyson Events Center
0:31 - Brian Rigali (2); 10:27 - Keegan Mantaro (1); 18:46 - Odeen Tufto (5)		First period		Jason O'Neill (1) - 2:17; Baker Shore (3) - sh - 8:57
No scoring		Second period		Jordan Seyfert (1) - 5:36
17:02 - Brian Rigali (3)		Third period		Jack Badini (6) - 5:16
2:27 - pp - Phillip Knies (2)		First overtime period		No scoring
Matīss Kivlenieks (20 saves / 24 shots)		Goalie stats		Matt Ladd (25 saves / 30 shots)

May 13	Sioux City Musketeers	1 – 5	Chicago Steel	Tyson Events Center
No scoring		First period	Reggie Lutz (6) - 11:03; Brannon McManus (5) - 11:49; Brannon McManus (6) - 16:12
No scoring		Second period	No scoring
15:14 - pp - Aapeli Räsänen (1)		Third period	Jake Jaremko (3) - pp - 7:47; Eduards Tralmaks (8) - pp - 13:13
Matīss Kivlenieks (20 saves / 24 shots); Todd Scott (4 saves / 5 shots)		Goalie stats	Aleš Stezka (38 saves / 39 shots)

May 19	Chicago Steel	3 – 0	Sioux City Musketeers	Fox Valley Ice Arena
4:18 - Jack Badini (7)		First period	No scoring
14:27 - pp - Johnny Walker (1)		Second period	No scoring
18:10 - en - Eduards Tralmaks (9)		Third period	No scoring
Aleš Stezka (27 saves / 27 shots)		Goalie stats	Matīss Kivlenieks (33 saves / 35 shots)

May 20	Chicago Steel	4 – 5	Sioux City Musketeers	Fox Valley Ice Arena
10:06 - pp - Mitch Lewandowski (3); 11:53 - Jake Jaremko (4)		First period	No scoring
10:58 - Jake Jaremko (5); 18:47 - pp - Reggie Lutz (7)		Second period	Aapeli Räsänen (2) - 2:37; Phillip Knies (3) - 10:02; Odeen Tufto (6) - 19:16
No scoring		Third period	Eeli Tolvanen (5) - 17:07; Kristián Pospíšil (5) - 18:51
Aleš Stezka (27 saves / 32 shots)		Goalie stats	Matīss Kivlenieks (20 saves / 24 shots)

May 23	Sioux City Musketeers	1 – 2	OT	Chicago Steel	Tyson Events Center
11:04 - Carson Vance (2)		First period		No scoring
No scoring		Second period		Eduards Tralmaks (10) - 15:27
No scoring		Third period		No scoring
No scoring		First overtime period		Tyler Gratton (1) - 11:30
Matīss Kivlenieks (25 saves / 27 shots)		Goalie stats		Aleš Stezka (45 saves / 46 shots)

Chicago wins series 3 – 2

== Playoff scoring leaders ==
Note: GP = Games played; G = Goals; A = Assists; Pts = Points; PIM = Penalty minutes

Player	Team	GP	G	A	Pts	PIM
Jack Badini	Chicago Steel	14	7	10	17	2
Marc Johnstone	Chicago Steel	14	3	12	15	6
Kristián Pospíšil	Sioux City Musketeers	13	5	9	14	14
Jake Jaremko	Chicago Steel	14	5	8	13	0
Eduards Tralmaks	Chicago Steel	14	10	2	12	2
Reggie Lutz	Chicago Steel	14	7	5	12	10
Mitch Lewandowski	Chicago Steel	13	3	9	12	10
Odeen Tufto	Sioux City Musketeers	13	6	5	11	2
Brannon McManus	Chicago Steel	14	6	4	10	2
Eeli Tolvanen	Sioux City Musketeers	13	5	5	10	6
Charlie Kelleher	Sioux City Musketeers	12	3	7	10	16
Tarek Baker	Sioux City Musketeers	13	3	7	10	10
Phillip Knies	Sioux City Musketeers	13	3	7	10	17
Graham Lillibridge	Chicago Steel	14	0	10	10	2
Ben Mirageas	Chicago Steel	14	0	10	10	6

== Playoff leading goaltenders ==
Note: GP = Games played; Mins = Minutes played; W = Wins; L = Losses; GA = Goals Allowed; SO = Shutouts; SV% = Save percentage; GAA = Goals against average

Player	Team	GP	Mins	W	L	GA	SO	SV%	GAA
Robbie Beydoun	Waterloo Black Hawks	8	480	5	3	16	1	.922	2.00
Aleš Stezka	Chicago Steel	13	796	9	4	27	3	.936	2.04
Matīss Kivlenieks	Sioux City Musketeers	13	807	8	5	28	2	.925	2.08
Ryan Bischel	Fargo Force	3	168	0	3	7	0	.931	2.49
Keith Petruzzelli	Muskegon Lumberjacks	2	138	0	2	6	0	.885	2.61
