= Patrick Kudla =

Canadian ice hockey player (born 1996)

- Born: April 2, 1996 (age 30) Guelph, Ontario, Canada
- Height: 6 ft 3 in (191 cm)
- Weight: 174 lb (79 kg; 12 st 6 lb)
- Position: Defence
- Shoots: Left
- ECHL team Former teams: Greensboro Gargoyles; HC Nové Zámky; HC Litvínov; HK Dukla Trenčín; Colorado Eagles; Tucson Roadrunners; Idaho Steelheads; Manchester Storm
- NHL draft: 158th overall, 2016; Arizona Coyotes
- Playing career: 2016–present

Patrick Anthony Kudla (born April 2, 1996) is a Canadian professional ice hockey player currently playing for the Greensboro Gargoyles in the ECHL.

== Playing career ==
Kudla was born and raised in Guelph, Ontario, where he played for the Guelph Hurricanes in the GOJHL from the 2012–13 season through to the 2014–15 season. In 2016, he was drafted 158th overall by the Arizona Coyotes in the National Hockey League, but never played in the league. During the 2017–18 season, he played for the University of Guelph ice hockey team.

After his season with the University of Guelph, he moved to Europe to play for HC Nové Zámky in the Slovak Extraliga. From here, during the 2019–20 season, he was drafted to HC Frýdek-Místek in the Czech Chance Liga, then subsequently to HC Litvínov in the Czech Extraliga, where he played 62 games across two seasons. In 2021, he returned to the Slovak Extraliga to play for HK Dukla Trenčín.

In the 2022–23 season, Kudla returned to North America to play for the Idaho Steelheads in the ECHL. Alongside Matthew Register, Kudla led the Steelheads blueline in scoring, placing top in the ECHL, by posting 50 points through just 58 regular season games. He also made 4 appearances in loans to the American Hockey League with the Colorado Eagles and Tucson Roadrunners.

On September 8, 2023, Kudla agreed to continue his tenure with the Steelheads, re-signing for the 2023–24 season.

== Career statistics ==
			Regular season					Playoffs
Season	Team	League	GP	G	A	Pts	PIM	GP	G	A	Pts	PIM
2012–13	Guelph Hurricanes	GOJHL	48	4	13	17	86	—	—	—	—	—
2013–14	Guelph Hurricanes	GOJHL	27	2	11	13	14	5	1	2	3	6
2013–14	Wellington Dukes	OJHL	10	1	1	2	4	—	—	—	—	—
2014–15	Guelph Hurricanes	GOJHL	48	15	46	61	56	4	1	6	7	8
2015–16	Oakville Blades	OJHL	50	13	53	66	86	11	1	7	8	18
2016–17	Dubuque Fighting Saints	USHL	58	8	30	38	71	8	3	6	9	2
2017–18	University of Guelph	USports	20	1	11	12	10	5	0	1	1	2
2018–19	HC Nové Zámky	Slovak	54	5	21	26	36	4	0	4	4	0
2018–19	HC Nové Zámky B	Slovak.1	2	1	2	3	0	—	—	—	—	—
2019–20	HC Frýdek-Místek	Czech.1	15	1	4	5	6	—	—	—	—	—
2019–20	HC Litvínov	ELH	33	4	5	9	18	—	—	—	—	—
2020–21	HC Litvínov	ELH	29	1	2	3	6	2	0	0	0	0
2021–22	HK Dukla Trenčín	Slovak	50	4	18	22	22	4	2	0	2	2
2022–23	Idaho Steelheads	ECHL	59	8	42	50	25	20	1	12	13	6
2022–23	Colorado Eagles	AHL	1	0	0	0	0	—	—	—	—	—
2022–23	Tucson Roadrunners	AHL	3	0	0	0	0	—	—	—	—	—
ELH totals			62	5	7	12	24	2	0	0	0	0
Slovak totals			104	9	39	48	58	8	2	4	6	2
