= Eduards Tralmaks =

Latvian ice hockey player (born 1997)

- Born: 17 February 1997 (age 29) Riga, Latvia
- Height: 192 cm (6 ft 4 in)
- Weight: 102 kg (225 lb; 16 st 1 lb)
- Position: Winger
- Shoots: Left
- NHL team (P) Cur. team Former teams: Edmonton Oilers; Bakersfield Condors (AHL); Rytíři Kladno
- National team: Latvia
- NHL draft: Undrafted
- Playing career: 2021–present

Eduards Tralmaks (born 17 February 1997) is a Latvian professional ice hockey player who is a winger for the Bakersfield Condors of the American Hockey League (AHL), while under contract to the Edmonton Oilers of the National Hockey League (NHL).

== Playing career ==
Tralmaks played college hockey for the Maine Black Bears from 2017 to 2021.

On 21 March 2025, Tralmaks signed as a free agent to a one-year, two-way contract with the Detroit Red Wings of the NHL. He spent the 2025–26 season with the Red Wings AHL affiliate, the Grand Rapids Griffins, contributing in a top six offensive role with 26 goals and 42 points through 64 regular season games.

As a free agent from the Red Wings, Tralmaks was signed to a one-year, two-way contract for the with the Edmonton Oilers for the 2026–27 season on 1 July 2026.

== International play ==
Tralmaks represented the Latvia national team at the 2026 Winter Olympics, and the 2024, 2025 and 2026 IIHF World Championship.

== Career statistics ==
=== Regular season and playoffs ===
			Regular season					Playoffs
Season	Team	League	GP	G	A	Pts	PIM	GP	G	A	Pts	PIM
2011–12	HS Rīga 15	Latvia U16	22	16	15	31	4	—	—	—	—	—
2012–13	HS Rīga 16	Latvia U18	16	4	9	13	2	—	—	—	—	—
2013–14	Boston Jr. Bandits 16U AAA	EJEPL 16U	20	20	14	34	26	3	1	0	1	14
2014–15	Boston Jr. Bandits 18U AAA	EJEPL 18U	20	13	14	27	4	5	2	7	9	16
2014–15	Boston Jr. Bandits 18U AAA	ECEL 18U	18	5	6	11	14	—	—	—	—	—
2015–16	Boston Jr. Bandits	EHL	40	28	27	55	22	4	2	1	3	2
2016–17	Chicago Steel	USHL	46	11	16	27	12	14	10	2	12	2
2017–18	University of Maine	NCAA	37	11	14	25	41	—	—	—	—	—
2018–19	University of Maine	NCAA	36	8	9	17	22	—	—	—	—	—
2019–20	University of Maine	NCAA	34	14	16	30	13	—	—	—	—	—
2020–21	University of Maine	NCAA	12	6	4	10	26	—	—	—	—	—
2020–21	Providence Bruins	AHL	8	2	2	4	2	—	—	—	—	—
2021–22	Providence Bruins	AHL	51	14	13	27	30	—	—	—	—	—
2021–22	Maine Mariners	ECHL	2	4	3	7	2	—	—	—	—	—
2022–23	Providence Bruins	AHL	28	6	4	10	10	3	0	1	1	2
2022–23	Maine Mariners	ECHL	1	0	0	0	0	—	—	—	—	—
2023–24	Rytíři Kladno	ELH	52	21	11	32	34	—	—	—	—	—
2024–25	Rytíři Kladno	ELH	48	23	28	51	66	—	—	—	—	—
2025–26	Grand Rapids Griffins	AHL	64	26	16	42	14	8	4	0	4	2
AHL totals			151	48	35	83	56	11	4	1	5	4
ELH totals			100	44	39	83	100	—	—	—	—	—

=== International ===
Year	Team	Event	GP	G	A	Pts	PIM
2015	Latvia U18	WJC-18	6	1	2	3	25
2017	Latvia U20	WJC-20	6	0	2	2	27
2024	Latvia	WC	7	1	1	2	0
2024	Latvia	OGQ	3	1	0	1	0
2025	Latvia	WC	7	3	4	7	8
2026	Latvia	OG	4	3	1	4	6
2026	Latvia	WC	3	2	4	6	0
Junior totals			12	1	4	5	52
Senior totals			24	10	10	20	14
