= Eeli Tolvanen =

Finnish ice hockey player (born 1999)

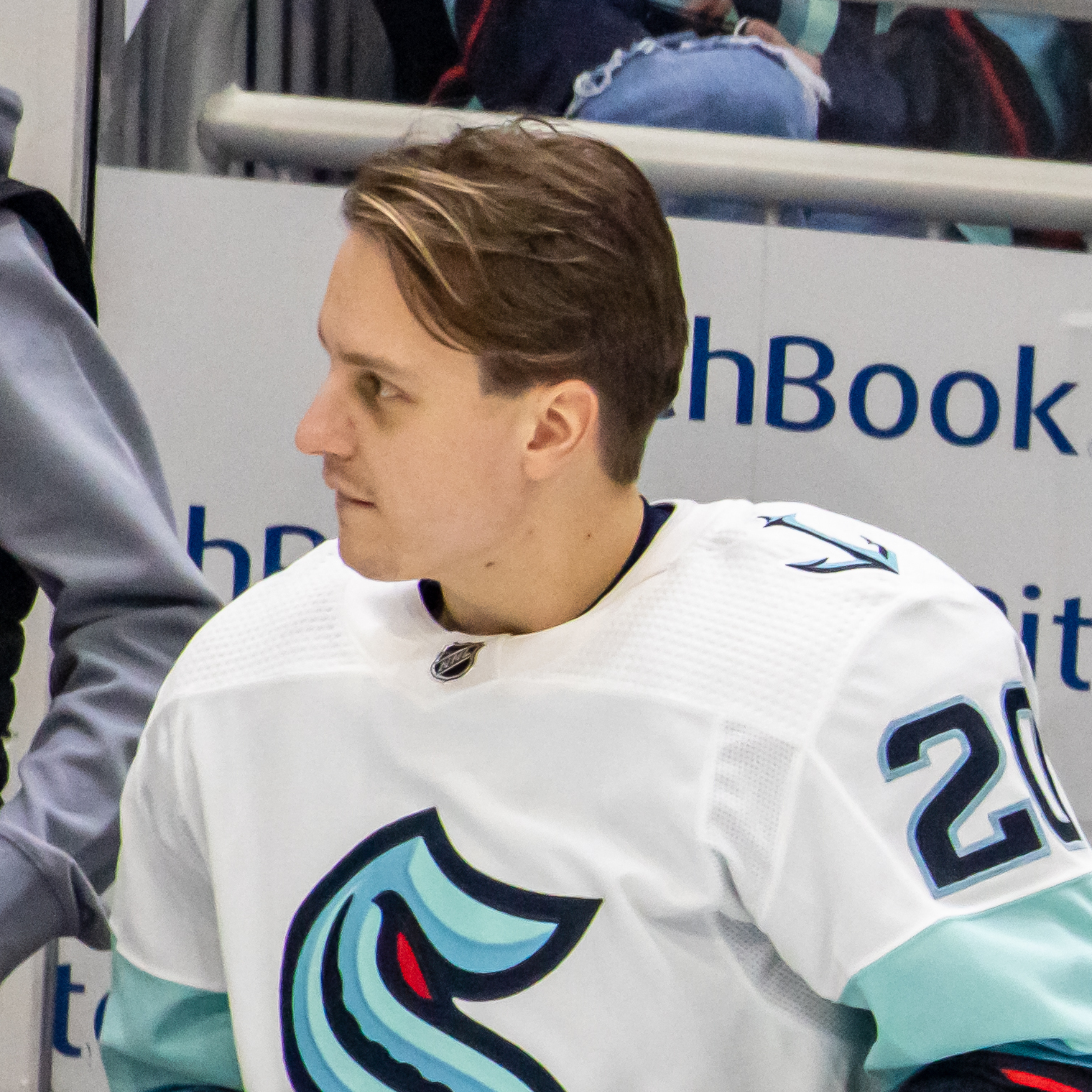
- Tolvanen with the Seattle Kraken in 2023
- Born: 22 April 1999 (age 27) Vihti, Finland
- Height: 5 ft 10 in (178 cm)
- Weight: 182 lb (83 kg; 13 st 0 lb)
- Position: Right wing
- Shoots: Left
- NHL team Former teams: New York Rangers; Jokerit; Nashville Predators; Seattle Kraken
- National team: Finland
- NHL draft: 30th overall, 2017; Nashville Predators
- Playing career: 2017–present

Eeli Tolvanen (Finnish pronunciation: [ˈeːli ˈtolʋɑnen]; born 22 April 1999) is a Finnish professional ice hockey player who is a right winger for the New York Rangers of the National Hockey League (NHL). Tolvanen was selected by the Nashville Predators 30th overall, in the 2017 NHL entry draft. He was born and raised in Vihti, Finland.

== Playing career ==
=== Amateur ===
Tolvanen first played in his native Finland within the Kiekko-Espoo of the SM-sarja. Upon the 2015–16 season, Tolvanen opted to pursue a North American development path, choosing to play junior hockey for the Sioux City Musketeers of the United States Hockey League (USHL). During the season, he put up 17 goals and 21 assists for 38 points, causing him to be selected by the Oshawa Generals in the 2016 OHL Import Draft. He would later commit to play collegiate hockey with Boston College on 13 June 2016.

Tolvanen would have a standout 2016–17 season with the Musketeers where he would stand eighth in the league in points (54), third in goals (30), and first in even-strength goals (24). Due to this, Tolvanen was selected as the 30th pick overall by the Nashville Predators in the 2017 NHL entry draft, where he was categorized by ESPN analyst Corey Pronman as "the steal of the draft." However, Tolvanen's collegiate aspirations were closed after his application was rejected by Boston College admissions due to an issue with his high school course credits on 22 June 2017.

=== Professional ===
==== Jokerit (2017–2018) ====
Following two seasons in the USHL, Tolvanen started his professional career in July 2017 by agreeing to an optional two-year contract with the Finnish-based Jokerit of the Kontinental Hockey League (KHL). He scored his first career KHL hat trick in his season debut against Dinamo Minsk on 23 August 2017. Tolvanen subsequently became the youngest player to record a hat trick in KHL history at 18 years old. He would score his second career KHL hat trick on 25 September 2017 in his eleventh game of the KHL season against Vityaz. As a result of his outstanding play, Tolvanen claimed KHL Rookie of the Month honors in September and October. In October, Tolvanen had recorded five goals and four assists for nine points through 12 games and was selected to represent Finland at the 2018 Winter Olympics. He was also voted in by fans to play at the 2018 KHL All-Star Game. Tolvanen finished the regular season with 19 goals and 17 assists through 49 games to set a new KHL scoring record for players under the age of nineteen. The previous record was held by Evgeny Kuznetsov who scored 32 points in 44 games in the 2010–11 season. During the KHL playoffs, Tolvanen tallied six goals to tie Valeri Nichushkin for the KHL goalscoring record. After Jokerit were eliminated by CSKA Moscow in the quarterfinals, he signed a three-year, entry-level contract with the Nashville Predators.

==== Nashville Predators (2018–2022) ====
Upon signing his entry-level contract, Tolvanen made his NHL debut on 31 March 2018, in a 7–4 loss to the Buffalo Sabres. He played 13:34 of ice time and recorded two shots on goal. He played three games with the Predators on their top line to help them finish the 2017–18 season.

Prior to the 2018–19 season, Tolvanen participated in the Predators' 2018 Development Camp and Prospect Showcase tournament. Tolvanen scored two goals in the tournament as the Predators rookies fell to the Washington Capitals prospects. He was then assigned to the Predators' American Hockey League (AHL) affiliate, the Milwaukee Admirals, to start the 2018–19 season. Tolvanen recorded his first career AHL goal on 13 October against the Hershey Bears. By the end of November, Tolvanen had accumulated four goals and 11 points through his first 21 games. He also ranked ninth among all AHL rookies in shots on goal with 48 and tied for fourth on the team in points. As a result, he was recalled to the NHL level on 1 December. He subsequently made his season debut that night and scored his first career NHL goal against Cam Ward of the Chicago Blackhawks. Tolvanen became the 177th player in franchise history to score a goal for the team. He added one assist through the next three games before being reassigned to the Admirals on 13 December. Upon rejoining the team, he added one more point to tie for sixth on the Admirals before being loaned to the Finland national U-18 team. Tolvanen finished his rookie season with the Admirals with 15 goals and 35 points.

During the 2018 off-season, the Predators' coaching staff asked Tolvanen to lose weight and become quicker on the ice to help him create more room to utilize his shot. He returned to the Predators' Rookie Camp noticeably slimmer and quicker on the ice. After attending the Predators' training camp, Tolvanen was reassigned to the Milwaukee Admirals in the AHL to begin the 2019–20 season. By 11 February 2020, Tolvanen tied with Anthony Richard and Cole Schneider for fifth place on the team with 13 goals. When the AHL paused play due to the COVID-19 pandemic, he had tallied 21 goals and 15 assists for 36 points through 63 games. He tied for fifth on the team in points, second in goals, and tied for the second-most power-play goals. Tolvanen returned to his original club Jokerit of the KHL on loan until the commencement of the delayed 2020–21 season. He made 25 further appearances for Jokerit, posting five goals and 13 points, before returning to North America on 15 December 2020.

==== Seattle Kraken (2022–2026) ====
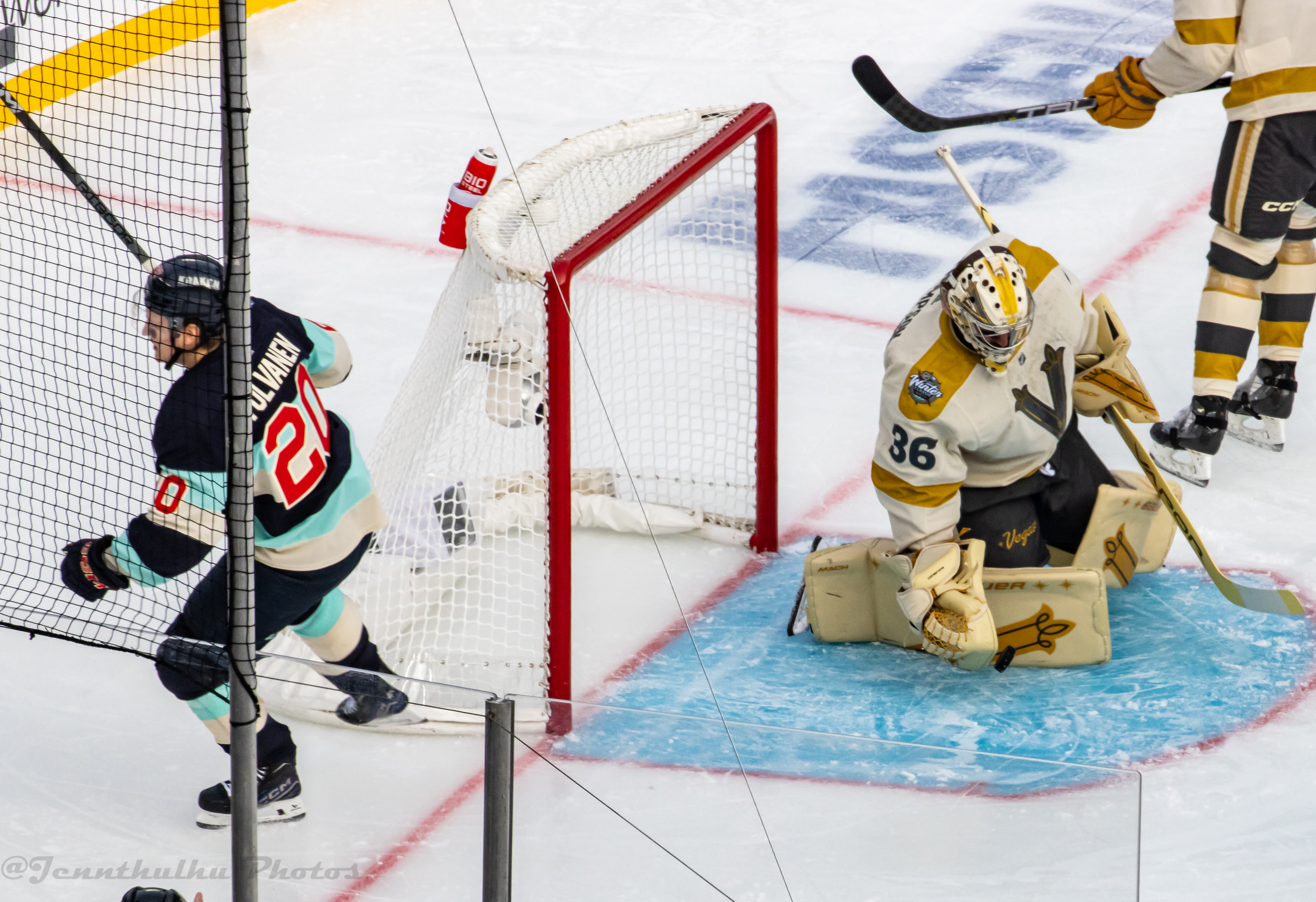
Tolvanen after scoring the first goal of the 2024 NHL Winter Classic.

In the midst of his sixth year in the Predators organization during the 2022–23 season, Tolvanen, having appeared in 13 games and with 4 points, was placed on waivers on 11 December 2022. His tenure with the Predators came to an end the following day after he was claimed off waivers by the Seattle Kraken. At the time, Predators general manager David Poile admitted "this could be a mistake on our part."

Tolvanen rapidly established himself in Seattle, scoring his first goal for Seattle on 1 January 2023, a power-play goal against the New York Islanders. He scored five goals and two assists in his first eight games. Tolvanen credited the Kraken with providing him with more consistent usage than had found in Nashville in recent times. On 25 March, he scored two goals against his former team during a road game in Nashville. He finished the season with 16 goals and 11 assists in 48 games, while the Kraken qualified to the Stanley Cup playoffs, a first in franchise history. On 18 April, Tolvanen scored Seattle's first ever playoff goal in an eventual 3–1 win in Game 1 of the Kraken's first-round series against the Colorado Avalanche. Tolvanen would be one of three to score for the Kraken in the 2024 NHL Winter Classic. He would also record an assist on Will Borgen's goal.

==== New York Rangers (2026–present) ====
On 2 September 2026, Tolvanen was signed to a one-year, $1.5 million contract by the New York Rangers.

== International play ==
Medal record

Representing Finland

Men's ice hockey

Winter Olympics
| Bronze medal – third place | 2026 Milano Cortina | |

World Junior Championships
| Gold medal – first place | 2019 Canada | |

World U18 Championships
| Gold medal – first place | 2016 United States | |

Tolvanen was selected to represent Finland under-18 team at the 2016 World U18 Championships where he helped Finland win gold. The following years he played for Finland junior team in the 2017 and the 2018 World Junior Championships. Tolvanen was also selected to play for Finland senior team at the 2018 Winter Olympics. In his Olympic debut, he recorded four points to help Finland beat Germany 5–2. He ended the tournament with 9 points in 5 games.

During 2025 World Championship, Tolvanen played against his brother Atte, who has received Austrian citizenship. They were third pair of brothers who faced each other, following Robert and Martin Reichel as well as Larry and Steve Rucchin.

He represented Finland at the 2026 Winter Olympics and won a bronze medal.

== Personal life ==
Tolvanen is the youngest of three brothers, Joona and Atte, who all play ice hockey. Joona plays in the Finnish Mestis league, while the older Atte plays for EC Red Bull Salzburg in the Austrian ICE Hockey League.

== Career statistics ==
=== Regular season and playoffs ===
| | | | Regular season | | | | | Playoffs |
| Season | Team | League | GP | G | A | Pts | PIM | GP | G | A | Pts | PIM |
|---|---|---|---|---|---|---|---|---|---|---|---|---|
| 2014–15 | Blues | FIN U18 | 41 | 39 | 45 | 84 | 24 | 9 | 1 | 3 | 4 | 14 |
| 2014–15 | Blues | FIN U20 | 7 | 2 | 3 | 5 | 2 | — | — | — | — | — |
| 2015–16 | Sioux City Musketeers | USHL | 49 | 17 | 21 | 38 | 12 | — | — | — | — | — |
| 2016–17 | Sioux City Musketeers | USHL | 52 | 30 | 24 | 54 | 26 | 13 | 5 | 5 | 10 | 6 |
| 2017–18 | Jokerit | KHL | 49 | 19 | 17 | 36 | 28 | 11 | 6 | 1 | 7 | 8 |
| 2017–18 | Nashville Predators | NHL | 3 | 0 | 0 | 0 | 0 | — | — | — | — | — |
| 2018–19 | Milwaukee Admirals | AHL | 58 | 15 | 20 | 35 | 24 | 5 | 0 | 0 | 0 | 2 |
| 2018–19 | Nashville Predators | NHL | 4 | 1 | 1 | 2 | 0 | — | — | — | — | — |
| 2019–20 | Milwaukee Admirals | AHL | 63 | 21 | 15 | 36 | 18 | — | — | — | — | — |
| 2020–21 | Jokerit | KHL | 25 | 5 | 8 | 13 | 10 | — | — | — | — | — |
| 2020–21 | Nashville Predators | NHL | 40 | 11 | 11 | 22 | 4 | 4 | 0 | 0 | 0 | 0 |
| 2021–22 | Nashville Predators | NHL | 75 | 11 | 12 | 23 | 16 | 3 | 1 | 0 | 1 | 2 |
| 2022–23 | Nashville Predators | NHL | 13 | 2 | 2 | 4 | 4 | — | — | — | — | — |
| 2022–23 | Seattle Kraken | NHL | 48 | 16 | 11 | 27 | 10 | 14 | 3 | 5 | 8 | 6 |
| 2023–24 | Seattle Kraken | NHL | 81 | 16 | 25 | 41 | 24 | — | — | — | — | — |
| 2024–25 | Seattle Kraken | NHL | 81 | 23 | 12 | 35 | 23 | — | — | — | — | — |
| 2025–26 | Seattle Kraken | NHL | 78 | 12 | 24 | 36 | 30 | — | — | — | — | — |
| KHL totals | | | 74 | 24 | 25 | 49 | 38 | 11 | 6 | 1 | 7 | 8 |
| NHL totals | | | 423 | 92 | 98 | 190 | 111 | 21 | 4 | 5 | 9 | 8 |

=== International ===
| Year | Team | Event | Result | GP | G | A | Pts | PIM |
|---|---|---|---|---|---|---|---|---|
| 2015 | Finland | IH18 | 4th | 5 | 1 | 1 | 2 | 0 |
| 2015 | Finland | U17 | 5th | 5 | 9 | 1 | 10 | 0 |
| 2016 | Finland | WJC18 | 1st place, gold medalist(s) | 7 | 7 | 2 | 9 | 0 |
| 2017 | Finland | WJC | 9th | 6 | 2 | 4 | 6 | 2 |
| 2018 | Finland | WJC | 6th | 5 | 1 | 5 | 6 | 4 |
| 2018 | Finland | OG | 6th | 5 | 3 | 6 | 9 | 4 |
| 2018 | Finland | WC | 5th | 4 | 2 | 2 | 4 | 2 |
| 2019 | Finland | WJC | 1st place, gold medalist(s) | 7 | 0 | 4 | 4 | 2 |
| 2025 | Finland | WC | 7th | 8 | 7 | 2 | 9 | 2 |
| 2026 | Finland | OG | 3rd place, bronze medalist(s) | 5 | 1 | 2 | 3 | 0 |
| Junior totals | | | | 35 | 20 | 17 | 37 | 8 |
| Senior totals | | | | 22 | 13 | 12 | 25 | 8 |

== Awards and honours ==
| Award | Year | Ref |
USHL
| All-Rookie Team | 2016 | |
| First All-Star Team | 2017 | |
KHL
| KHL All-Star Game | 2018 | |
| KHL Rookie of the Month | 2017, 2018 | |
International
| U17 All-Star Team | 2016 | |
| Olympic All-Star Team | 2018 | |

Awards and achievements
| Preceded by Dante Fabbro | Nashville Predators first-round draft pick 2017 | Succeeded by Philip Tomasino |
