= 2022 Karjala Tournament =

2022 Karjala Tournament (Euro Hockey Games)
Tournament details
- Host countries: Finland; Czechia
- Cities: Turku; České Budějovice
- Venues: 2 (in 2 host cities)
- Dates: 10–13 November 2022
- Teams: 4

Final positions
- Champions: Sweden (6th title)
- Runners-up: Switzerland
- Third place: Finland
- Fourth place: Czech Republic

Tournament statistics
- Games played: 6
- Goals scored: 32 (5.33 per game)
- Attendance: 29,811 (4,969 per game)
- Scoring leader: (Sweden) André Petersson (5 points)

Official website
- leijonat.com

The 2022 Karjala Tournament was played between 10 and 13 November 2022. The Czech Republic, Finland, Sweden and Switzerland played a round-robin for a total of three games per team and six games in total. One game was played in Budvar Arena, České Budějovice, Czech Republic (Sweden vs Czechia) all the other games were played in Gatorade Center, Turku. Sweden won the tournament. The tournament was part of 2022–23 Euro Hockey Tour.

Switzerland replaced Russia due to the Russian invasion of Ukraine.

== Standings ==
Pos	Team	Pld	W	OTW	OTL	L	GF	GA	GD	Pts
1	Sweden	3	1	1	0	1	8	7	+1	5
2	Switzerland	3	0	2	1	0	8	7	+1	5
3	Finland	3	1	0	1	1	8	9	−1	4
4	Czech Republic	3	1	0	1	1	8	9	−1	4

Source: eurohockey

== Games ==
All times are local. Helsinki – (Eastern European Time – UTC+2) České Budějovice– (Central European Time – UTC+1) Source

10 November 2025; 18:30	Czech Republic	1-4 (0-0, 0-2, 1-2)	Sweden	Budvar Arena, České Budějovice; Attendance: 6,164

Game reference

Marek Langhamer
Goalies
Marcus Högberg

	0-1	26:06 – André Petersson (Jesper Sellgren)
	0-2	26:46 – André Petersson (Pär Lindholm, Olle Alsing)
	0-3	41:25 – André Petersson (Pär Lindholm, Olle Alsing)
40:34 – Filip Chlapík (Michael Spacek, Radan Lenc)	1-3
	1-4	48:17 – Olle Alsing (Linus Johansson) (PP)

8 min
Penalties
8 min
17
Shots
16

10 November 2025; 18:30	Switzerland	3-2 GWS (1-0, 0-1, 1-1) (OT: 0–0) (SO: 1–0)	Finland	Gatorade Center, Turku; Attendance: 5,082

Game reference

Leonardo Genoni
Goalies
Harri Säteri
Referees:
(Sweden) Richard Magnusson
(Sweden) Andreas Harnebring
Linesmen:
(Finland) Hannu Sormunen
(Finland) Onni Hautamäki

09:20 – Sven Andrighetto (Andres Ambühl, Christoph Bertschy)	1-0
	1-1	21:08 – Jere Innala (Antti Suomela, Anrei Hakulinen) (PP)
	1-2	43:57 – Jere Karjalainen (Mikko Lehtonen, Juuso Riikola)
50:08 – Roger Karrer (Sven Andrighetto, Andres Ambühl)	2-2

Riat
Shootout

4 min
Penalties
2 min
28
Shots
16

12 November 2025; 12:30	Sweden	3-2 OT (1–0, 0–1, 1–1) (OT: 1–0)	Switzerland	Gatorade Center, Turku; Attendance: 993

Game reference

Joel Lassinantti
Goalies
Sandro Aeschlimann
Referees:
(Finland) Anssi Salonen
(Finland) Kristian Vikman
Linesmen:
(Finland) Tommi Niittylä
(Finland) Nico Grundström

06:31 – André Petersson (Pär Lindholm, Isac Brännström)	1-0
	1-1	34:34 – Damien Riat (Tyler Moy, Santeri Alatalo) (PP)
47:33 – Jonathan Dahlén (Jesper Sellgren, Linus Johansson)	2-1
	2-2	00:00 – Patrick Geering (Grégory Hofmann, Sven Senteler) (PP)
61:05 – Jonathan Dahlén (André Petersson, Joel Persson)	3-2

4 min
Penalties
6 min
24
Shots
20

12 November 2025; 16:30	Finland	2-5 (1-1, 0-2, 1-2)	Czech Republic	Gatorade Center, Turku; Attendance: 8,168

Game reference

Niclas Westerholm
Goalies
Roman Will
Referees:
(Sweden) Andreas Harnebring
(Sweden) Richard Magnusson
Linesmen:
(Finland) Jussi Thomann
(Finland) Lauri Nikulainen

	0-1	07:41 – Jiri Smejkal (Patrik Zdráhal, Libor Zábranský)
10:59 – Jerry Turkulainen (Mikko Lehtonen, Jere Karjalainen) (PP)	1-1
	1-2	27:21 – Radan Lenc (Michael Spacek, Petr Kodýtek) (PP)
	1-3	35:00 – Tomáš Dvořák (Jan Kostalek, Hynek Zohorna)
	1-4	47:37 – Michael Spacek (Radan Lenc, Filip Chlapík)
51:27 – Joose Antonen (Vili Saarijärvi, Jori Lehterä) (PP)	2-4
	2-5	51:48 – Radan Lenc (Filip Chlapík, Michael Spacek)

4 min
Penalties
10 min
29
Shots
19

13 November 2025; 12:30	Czech Republic	2-3 OT (2-1, 0-1, 0-0) (OT: 0–1)	Switzerland	Gatorade Center, Turku; Attendance: 892

Game reference

Roman Will
Goalies
Leonardo Genoni
Referees:
(Finland) Mikko Kaukokari
(Finland) Lassi Heikkinen
Linesmen:
(Finland) Luka Mäkinen
(Finland) Niko Nurmio

09:56 – Jiri Smejkal (Petr Kodýtek, Tomáš Dvořák)	1-0
	1-1	10:38 – Andres Ambühl
13:00 – Michael Spacek (Jan Kostalek, Filip Chlapík) (PP)	2-1
	2-2	37:31 – Noah Rod (Calvin Thürkauf, Mirco Müller)
	2-3	60:20 – Sven Senteler

8 min
Penalties
10 min
20
Shots
28

13 November 2025; 16:30	Finland	4-1 (1-0, 0-1, 3-0)	Sweden	Gatorade Center, Turku; Attendance: 8,512

Game reference

Harri Säteri
Goalies
Marcus Högberg
Referees:
(Czech Republic) Jakub Šindel
(Czech Republic) Daniel Prazak
Linesmen:
(Finland) Joni Pekkala
(Finland) Niko Jusi

11:14 – Hannes Björninen (Joose Antonen, Mikko Lehtonen) (PP)	1-0
	1-1	22:11 – Max Friberg (Oscar Möller, Oscar Engsund)
43:25 – Antti Suomela (Marko Anttila)	2-1
58:12 – Marko Anttila (Harri Säteri) (EN)	3-1
59:21 – Eetu Liukas (EN)	4-1

4 min
Penalties
4 min
28
Shots
18

== Scoring leaders ==
Pos	Player	Country	GP	G	A	Pts	+/−	PIM	POS
1	André Petersson	Sweden	3	4	1	5	+2	2	F
2	Michael Špaček	Czech Republic	3	2	3	5	+2	2	F
3	Radan Lenc	Czech Republic	3	2	2	4	+3	2	F
4	Filip Chlapík	Czech Republic	3	1	3	4	+2	0	F
5	Olle Alsing	Sweden	3	2	1	3	+2	6	D

GP = Games played; G = Goals; A = Assists; Pts = Points; +/− = Plus/minus; PIM = Penalties in minutes; POS = Position
Source: quanthockey
