= 2023 Czech Hockey Games =

2023 Czech Hockey Games (Euro Hockey Games)
Tournament details
- Host countries: Czechia; Sweden
- Cities: Brno; Gothenburg
- Venues: 2 (in 2 host cities)
- Dates: 4-7 May 2023
- Teams: 4

Final positions
- Champions: Switzerland (1st title)
- Runners-up: Sweden
- Third place: Czech Republic
- Fourth place: Finland

Tournament statistics
- Games played: 6
- Goals scored: 30 (5 per game)
- Attendance: 28,939 (4,823 per game)
- Scoring leader: (Sweden) Lucas Raymond (6 points)

The 2023 Carlson Hockey Games was played between 4 and 7 May 2023. The Czech Republic, Finland, Sweden and Switzerland played a round-robin for a total of three games per team and six games in total. Five of the games were played in Brno, Czech Republic and one game in Gothenburg, Sweden. The tournament was won by Switzerland. The tournament was part of the 2022–23 Euro Hockey Tour.

== Standings ==
| Pos | Team | Pld | W | OTW | OTL | L | GF | GA | GD | Pts |
|---|---|---|---|---|---|---|---|---|---|---|
| 1 | Switzerland | 3 | 2 | 0 | 0 | 1 | 5 | 6 | −1 | 6 |
| 2 | Sweden | 3 | 1 | 1 | 0 | 1 | 10 | 7 | +3 | 5 |
| 3 | Czech Republic | 3 | 1 | 0 | 1 | 1 | 8 | 9 | −1 | 4 |
| 4 | Finland | 3 | 0 | 1 | 1 | 1 | 7 | 8 | −1 | 3 |

Source: eurohockey.com

== Games ==
All times are local. Prague – (Central European Summer Time – UTC+2) Göteborg – (Central European Summer Time – UTC+2)

| 4 May 2023; 18:20 | Finland | 3-2 OT (1–0, 0–0, 1–2) (OT: 1–0) | Czech Republic | Winning Group Arena, Brno; Attendance: 5,417 |

Game reference

Emil Larmi
Goalies
Karel Vejmelka
Referees:
(Czech Republic) Miroslav Stolc
(Czech Republic) Michael Tscherrig

| 17:58 – Harri Pesonen (Kasperi Kapanen) | 1-0 |
| | 1-1 | 48:24 – Ronald Knot (Dominik Kubalík) |
| | 1-2 | 55:21 – Roman Cervenka (Dominik Kubalík) |
| 59:37 – Mikael Ruohomaa (Waltteri Merelä, Sakari Manninen) | 2-2 |
| 62:12 – Harri Pesonen (Olli Määttä, Mikael Ruohomaa) | 3-2 |

12 min
Penalties
8 min
26
Shots
36

| 4 May 2023; 19:00 | Sweden | 3-0 (1-0, 0-0, 2-0) | Switzerland | Scandinavium, Gothenburg; Attendance: 6,837 |

Game reference

Lars Johansson
Goalies
Joren van Pottelberghe
Referees:
(Finland) Lassi Heikkinen
(Finland) Mikko Kaukokari

| 05:23 – Lucas Raymond (Rasmus Sandin, Leo Carlsson) (PP) | 1-0 |
| 52:56 – Lucas Raymond (Leo Carlsson, Jonatan Berggren) (PP) | 2-0 |
| 58:00 – Alexander Nylander (Jonatan Berggren) (EN) | 3-0 |

4 min
Penalties
10 min
22
Shots
20

| 6 May 2023; 12:00 | Switzerland | 2-1 (1-1, 1-0, 0-0) | Finland | Winning Group Arena, Brno; Attendance: 3,468 |

Game reference

Leonardo Genoni
Goalies
Jussi Olkinuora
Referees:
(Czech Republic) Antonín Jeřábek
(Czech Republic) Jiří Ondráček

| 04:28 – Marco Miranda (Dario Simion) | 1-0 |
| | 1-1 | 17:25 – Olli Määttä |
| 24:49 – Calvin Thürkauf (Romain Loeffel, Gaëtan Haas) (PP) | 2-1 |

6 min
Penalties
4 min
23
Shots
14

| 6 May 2023; 12:00 | Czech Republic | 4-3 (0-1, 3-0, 1-2) | Sweden | Winning Group Arena, Brno; Attendance: 5,278 |

Game reference

Šimon Hrubec
Goalies
Marcus Högberg
Referees:
(Slovakia) Miroslav Stolc
(Switzerland) Michael Tscherrig

| | 0-1 | 05:05 – Oscar Lindberg (SHG) |
| 33:20 – Daniel Voženílek (Ondřej Beránek, Jiří Černoch) | 1-1 |
| 37:25 – Michael Spacek (Dominik Kubalík, Ronald Knot) | 2-1 |
| 39:03 – Jiří Černoch (Daniel Voženílek, Ondřej Beránek) | 3-1 |
| 45:45 – Ondřej Beránek (Daniel Voženílek) | 4-1 |
| | 4-2 | 48:52 – Alexander Nylander (Lucas Raymond, Rasmus Sandin) (PP) |
| | 4-3 | 57:40 – Lucas Raymond (Rasmus Sandin) |

14 min
Penalties
10 min
26
Shots
28

| 7 May 2023; 12:00 | Sweden | 4-3 OT (1–0, 1–2, 1–1) (OT: 1–0) | Finland | Winning Group Arena, Brno; Attendance: 3,152 |

Game reference

Jesper Wallstedt
Goalies
Christian Heljanko
Referees:
(Czech Republic) Robin Šír
(Czech Republic) Daniel Pražák

| 12:13 – André Petersson (Anton Lindholm) | 1-0 |
| | 1-1 | 26:25 – Teemu Hartikainen (Sakari Manninen, Mikko Lehtonen) (PP) |
| 36:19 – Henrik Tömmernes (Lucas Raymond, Oscar Lindberg) | 2-1 |
| | 2-2 | 39:35 – Antti Suomela (Waltteri Merelä) |
| | 2-3 | 42:35 – Ahti Oksanen (Marko Anttila) (SHG) |
| 56:08 – Fabian Zetterlund (Oscar Lindberg, Lucas Raymond) (PP) | 3-3 |
| 61:28 – Pär Lindholm (André Petersson) | 4-3 |

6 min
Penalties
10 min
34
Shots
25

| 7 May 2023; 16:00 | Czech Republic | 2-3 (1-1, 0-1, 1-1) | Switzerland | Winning Group Arena, Brno; Attendance: 4,787 |

Game reference

Karel Vejmelka
Goalies
Robert Mayer
Referees:
(Sweden) Daniel Eriksson
(Sweden) Andreas Harnebring

| 00:29 – Michal Kempny (Jiří Smejkal, Filip Chlapík) | 1-0 |
| | 1-1 | 06:29 – Gaëtan Haas (Romain Loeffel) (PP) |
| | 1-2 | 35:26 – Romain Loeffel (Enzo Corvi, Gaëtan Haas) (PP) |
| 40:12 – Jiří Smejkal (Filip Chlapík) | 2-2 |
| | 2-3 | 45:59 – Marco Miranda (Michael Fora, Tim Berni) |

27 min
Penalties
8 min
21
Shots
28

== Scoring leaders ==
| Pos | Player | Country | GP | G | A | Pts | +/− | PIM | POS |
|---|---|---|---|---|---|---|---|---|---|
| 1 | Lucas Raymond | Sweden | 3 | 3 | 3 | 6 | +0 | 0 | F |
| 2 | Gaetan Haas | Switzerland | 2 | 1 | 2 | 3 | +0 | 0 | F |
| 3 | Ondřej Beránek | Czech Republic | 3 | 1 | 2 | 3 | +2 | 25 | F |
| 4 | Oscar Lindberg | Sweden | 3 | 1 | 2 | 3 | +2 | 2 | F |
| 5 | Romain Loeffel | Switzerland | 3 | 1 | 2 | 3 | -1 | 0 | D |

GP = Games played; G = Goals; A = Assists; Pts = Points; +/− = Plus/minus; PIM = Penalties in minutes; POS = Position
Source: quanthockey
