= 2022 Swiss Ice Hockey Games =

2022 Swiss Ice Hockey Games (Euro Hockey Games)
Tournament details
- Host countries: Switzerland; Finland
- Cities: Fribourg, Helsinki
- Venues: 2 (in 2 host cities)
- Dates: 15-18 December 2022
- Teams: 4

Final positions
- Champions: Sweden (1st title)
- Runners-up: Czech Republic
- Third place: Finland
- Fourth place: Switzerland

Tournament statistics
- Games played: 6
- Goals scored: 29 (4.83 per game)
- Attendance: 20,482 (3,414 per game)
- Scoring leaders: (Finland) Markus Granlund; (Finland) Teemu Hartikainen; (4 points)

The 2022 Swiss Ice Hockey Games was played between 15 and 18 December 2022. The tournament was part of the 2022–23 Euro Hockey Tour, replacing the Channel One Cup in response to the Russian invasion of Ukraine. The Czech Republic, Finland, Sweden and Switzerland played a round-robin for a total of three games per team and six games in total. Five of the games were played in Fribourg, Switzerland and one game in Helsinki, Finland. The tournament was won by Sweden.

== Standings ==
Pos	Team	Pld	W	OTW	OTL	L	GF	GA	GD	Pts
1	Sweden	3	1	2	0	0	11	5	+6	7
2	Czech Republic	3	2	0	0	1	5	7	−2	6
3	Finland	3	1	0	1	1	9	8	+1	4
4	Switzerland	3	0	0	1	2	4	9	−5	1

Source: eurohockey

== Games ==
All times are local. Fribourg – (Central European Time – UTC+1) Helsinki – (Eastern European Time – UTC+2)

15 December 2022; 18:30	Finland	2-3 (0-2, 0-0, 2-1)	Czech Republic	Helsinki Ice Hall, Helsinki; Attendance: 4,358

Game reference

Emil Larmi
Goalies
Šimon Hrubec
Referees:
(Sweden) Tobias Björk
(Sweden) Mikael Holm
Linesmen:
(Finland) Luka Makinen
(Finland) Lauri NikulaineN

	0-1	03:09 – Matěj Stránský (Filip Chlapík, Michael Špaček)
	0-2	05:15 – Ondřej Beránek (Jiří Černoch, Martin Jandus)
49:31 – Elmeri Eronen (Toni Rajala, Arttu Ruotsalainen)	1-2
	1-3	57:02 – David Tomášek (Jan Košťálek, Michael Špaček)
58:31 – Joonas Kemppainen (Sami Lepistö, Teemu Hartikainen)	2-3

6 min
Penalties
6 min
32
Shots
15

15 December 2022; 20:15	Sweden	3-2 OT (0-0, 2-1, 0-1) (OT: 1-0)	Switzerland	BCF Arena, Fribourg; Attendance: 3,245

Game reference

Marcus Högberg
Goalies
Ludovic Waeber
Referees:
(Finland) Anssi Salonen
(Finland) Joonas Kova
Linesmen:
(Switzerland) Eric Cattaneo
(Switzerland) Dario Fuchs

27:23 – Jacob de la Rose (Klas Dahlbäck, Marcus Sörensen)	1-0
	1-1	33:10 – Damien Riat
37:500 – Jesper Olofsson	2-1
	2-2	59:16 – Dean Kukan (Christoph Bertschy)
63:05 – Marcus Sörensen (Jacob de la Rose)	3-2

6 min
Penalties
0 min
24
Shots
35

17 December 2022; 13:30	Finland	3-4 GWS (0-0, 1-2, 2-1) (OT: 0-0) (SO:0-1)	Sweden	BCF Arena, Fribourg; Attendance: 2,685

Game reference

Referees:
(Czech Republic) Mark Lemelin
(Czech Republic) Michael Tscherrig
Linesmen:
(Switzerland) Eric Cattaneo
(Switzerland) Zach Steenstra

	0-1	24:03 – Marcus Sörensen (Martin Lundberg)
27:06 – Mikael Ruohomaa (Sami Niku, Harri Pesonen) (PP)	1-1
	1-2	34:20 – Emil Heineman (Oscar Lindberg)
40:56 – Joona Ikonen (Joonas Kemppainen, Eemeli Suomi)	2-2
42:52 – Markus Granlund (Mikael Ruohomaa, Teemu Hartikainen)	3-2
	3-3	45:23 – Jesper Olofsson

Granlund (miss)
Ikonen (miss)
Hartikainen (miss)
Pesonen (miss)
Kuokkanen
Eemeli Suomi (miss)
Shootout
(miss) Bristedt
(miss) Tömmernes
(miss) Ejdsell
Wallmark
(miss) Olofsson
Sörensen
10 min
Penalties
6 min
29
Shots
47

17 December 2022; 20:15	Switzerland	1-2 (0-0, 0-0, 1-2)	Czech Republic	BCF Arena, Fribourg; Attendance: 3,578

Game reference

Connor Hughes
Goalies
Marek Langhamer
Referees:
(Finland) Anssi Salonen
(Finland) Joonas Kova
Linesmen:
(Czech Republic) Dominik Altmann
(Czech Republic) Thomas Wolf

	0-1	49:15 – Jan Košťálek (Jakub Flek)
	0-2	54:02 – Jiří Smejkal (David Němeček, Petr Kodýtek)
56:12 – Enzo Corvi (Gaëtan Haas, Simon Le Coultre)	1-2

6 min
Penalties
8 min
44
Shots
20

18 December 2022; 13:00	Switzerland	1-4 (1-0, 0-3, 0-1)	Finland	BCF Arena, Fribourg; Attendance: 4,489

Game reference

Gauthier Descloux
Goalies
Emil Larmi
Referees:
(Czech Republic) Adam Kika
(Czech Republic) Daniel Prazak
Linesmen:
(Switzerland) David Obwegeser
(Switzerland) Dario Fuchs

15:41 – Lukas Frick (Vincent Praplan)	1-0
	1-1	20:16 – Markus Granlund (Teemu Hartikainen)
	1-2	26:55 – Teemu Hartikainen (Miro Aaltonen, Markus Granlund)
	1-3	39:23 – Arttu Ruotsalainen (Toni Rajala, Juhani Tyrväinen)
	1-4	40:30 – Markus Granlund (Teemu Hartikainen)

4 min
Penalties
6 min
41
Shots
29

18 December 2022; 16:30	Czech Republic	0-4 (0-1, 0-2, 0-1)	Sweden	BCF Arena, Fribourg; Attendance: 2,127

Game reference

Šimon Hrubec Marek Langhamer
Goalies
Marcus Högberg
Referees:
(United States) Mark Lemelin
(Switzerland) Michael Tscherrig
Linesmen:
(Switzerland) Eric Cattaneo
(Finland) Dominik Altman

0-1	14:03 – Jesper Olofsson (Henrik Tömmernes) (PP)
0-2	26:41 – Emil Heineman (Oscar Fantenberg, Klas Dahlbäck)
0-3	29:30 – Oscar Fantenberg (Oscar Lindberg, Leon Bristedt)
0-4	57:38 – Emil Heineman (Dennis Rasmussen) (EN)

6 min
Penalties
10 min
33
Shots
25

== Scoring leaders ==
Pos	Player	Country	GP	G	A	Pts	+/−	PIM	POS
1	Markus Granlund	Finland	3	3	1	4	+1	0	F
2	Teemu Hartikainen	Finland	3	1	3	4	+1	2	F
3	Jesper Olofsson	Sweden	3	3	0	3	0	2	F
4	Emil Heineman	Sweden	3	3	0	3	0	0	F
5	Marcus Sörensen	Sweden	3	2	1	3	0	0	F

GP = Games played; G = Goals; A = Assists; Pts = Points; +/− = Plus/minus; PIM = Penalties in minutes; POS = Position
Source: quanthockey

== Goaltending leaders ==
Pos	Player	Country	TOI	GA	GAA	Sv%	SO
1	Marcus Högberg	Sweden	123:05	2	0.97	97.06	1
2	Marek Langhamer	Czech Republic	114:00	4	2.11	93.85	0
3	Emil Larmi	Finland	182:58	9	2.95	86.76	0

TOI = Time on ice (minutes:seconds); SA = Shots against; GA = Goals against; GAA = Goals Against Average; Sv% = Save percentage; SO = Shutouts
Source: Swiss Ice Hockey
