= 2023 Sweden Hockey Games =

2023 Beijer Hockey Games (Euro Hockey Tour)
Tournament details
- Host countries: Sweden; Switzerland
- Cities: Malmö; Zürich
- Venues: 2 (in 2 host cities)
- Dates: 9-12 February 2023
- Teams: 4

Final positions
- Champions: Sweden (14th title)
- Runners-up: Finland
- Third place: Czech Republic
- Fourth place: Switzerland

Tournament statistics
- Games played: 6
- Goals scored: 30 (5 per game)
- Attendance: 30,203 (5,034 per game)
- Scoring leader(s): (Finland) Juhamatti Aaltonen (Finland) Ahti Oksanen (4 points)

Official website
- swehockey

The 2023 Beijer Hockey Games was played between 9 and 12 February 2023. The Czech Republic, Finland, Sweden and Switzerland played a round-robin for a total of three games per team and six games in total. One match was played in Zürich, Switzerland; the rest of the matches were played in Stockholm, Sweden. Sweden won the tournament. The tournament was part of the 2022–23 Euro Hockey Tour.

== Standings ==
Pos	Team	Pld	W	OTW	OTL	L	GF	GA	GD	Pts
1	Sweden	3	2	0	1	0	6	3	+3	7
2	Finland	3	1	1	0	1	13	9	+4	5
3	Czech Republic	3	0	2	0	1	5	8	−3	4
4	Switzerland	3	0	0	2	1	6	10	−4	2

Source: swehockey

== Games ==
All times are local. Stockholm – (Central European Time – UTC+1) Zürich – (Central European Time – UTC+1)

9 February 2023; 19:00	Czech Republic	2-1 (1-0, 0-0, 0-1, 1-0)	Sweden	Malmö Arena, Malmö; Attendance: 5,132

Game reference

Ales Stezka
Goalies
Lars Johansson
Referees:
(Finland) Lassi Heikkinen
(Finland) Riku Brander
Linesmen:
(Sweden) Ludvig Lundgren
(Sweden) Emil Yletyinen

17:57 – Kovar (Lakatos, Zámorský)	1-0
	1-1	42:29 – Wallmark (Dahlén, Larsson)
60:35 – Klok (Kovar, Chlapík)	2-1

6 min
Penalties
4 min
14
Shots
30

9 February 2023; 20:15	Switzerland	5-6 GWS (1-1, 4-2, 0-2) (OT: 0–0) (SO: 0–1)	Finland	Swiss Life Arena, Zürich; Attendance: 6,623

Game reference

Melvin Nyffeler
Goalies
Emil Larmi
Referees:
(Czech Republic) Antonin Jerabek
(Czech Republic) Jiří Ondráček
Linesmen:
(Switzerland) Dominik Schlegel
(Switzerland) Eric Cattaneo

	0-1	05:07 – Tikka (Kuokkanen, Ikonen)
06:38 – Hischier (Riedi)	1-1
20:14 – Thurkauf (Herzog, Fora)	2-1
23:25 – Meyer (Frick, Eggenberger)	3-1
24:07 – Knak (Bader, Riedi)	4-1
	4-2	25:16 – Ruotsalainen (Oksanen)
33:20 – Fora (Knak, Kunzle)	5-2
	5-3	35:51 – Ojamäki (Innala)
	5-4	41:46 – Eronen (Tikka)
	5-5	57:31 – Tikka (Aaltonen, Kemiläinen)

F.Herzog (miss)
K.Jäger (miss)
W.Riedi (miss)
M.Kunzle (miss)
C.Thurkauf (miss)
Shootout
A.Oksanen
(miss) T.Tikka
(miss) K.Kossila
(miss) J.Kuokkanen
(miss) A.Ruotsalainen
6 min
Penalties
6 min
27
Shots
29

11 February 2023; 15:30	Finland	6-1 (2-0, 4-0, 0-1)	Switzerland	Malmö Arena, Malmö; Attendance: 1,213

Game reference

Juha Jatkola
Goalies
~~Petr Kvaca~~
Ales Stezka
Referees:
(Sweden) Tobias Björk
(Sweden) Christoffer Holm
Linesmen:
(Sweden) Anders Nyqvist
(Sweden) Ludvig Lundgren

11:56 – Matinpalo (Aaltonen, Sallinen)	1-0
14:56 – Aaltonen (Sallinen, Kossila)	2-0
21:09 – Ruotsalainen (Oksanen, Jääskä)	3-0
23:55 – Ruotsalainen (Oksanen)	4-0
28:45 – Saarijärvi (Innala, Mattila)	5-0
36:20 – Jääskä (Sallinen, Eronen)	6-0
	6-1	41:31 – Zohorna (Smejkal, Sobotka)

4 min
Penalties
4 min
20
Shots
17

11 February 2023; 16:00	Sweden	2-0 (1-0, 0-0, 1-0)	Switzerland	Malmö Arena, Malmö; Attendance: 5,477

Game reference
Jhonas Enroth	Goalies	Sandro Aeschlimann	Referees: (Finland) Lassi Heikkinen (Finland) Riku Brander; Linesmen: (Sweden) Gustav Jonsson (Sweden) Emil Yletyinen
08:55 – Wallmark (Sörensen, Persson) / 1-0; 56:08 – Lindberg (Sörensen, Pudas) / 2-0			Referees: (Finland) Lassi Heikkinen (Finland) Riku Brander; Linesmen: (Sweden) Gustav Jonsson (Sweden) Emil Yletyinen
6 min	Penalties	12 min	Referees: (Finland) Lassi Heikkinen (Finland) Riku Brander; Linesmen: (Sweden) Gustav Jonsson (Sweden) Emil Yletyinen
31	Shots	13	Referees: (Finland) Lassi Heikkinen (Finland) Riku Brander; Linesmen: (Sweden) Gustav Jonsson (Sweden) Emil Yletyinen

12 February 2023; 12:00	Switzerland	1-2 OT (0-1, 0-0, 1-0) (OT: 0–1)	Czech Republic	Malmö Arena, Malmö; Attendance: 2,431

Game reference

~~Sandro Aeschlimann~~
Melvin Nyffeler
Goalies
Ales Stezka
Referees:
(Sweden) Tobias Björk
(Sweden) Christoffer Holm
Linesmen:
(Sweden) Gustav Jonsson
(Sweden) Emil Yletyinen

	0-1	05:13 – Flek (Musil, Klok)
55:15 – Kunzle (Thurkauf, Fora)	1-1
	1-2	61:33 – Chlapík (Kempny, Zohorna)

6 min
Penalties
7 min
21
Shots
19

12 February 2023; 16:00	Sweden	3-1 (1-0, 2-0, 0-1)	Finland	Malmö Arena, Malmö; Attendance: 9,327

Game reference

Lars Johansson
Goalies
Juha Jatkola
Referees:
(Switzerland) Lukas Kohlmüller
(Switzerland) Cedric Borga
Linesmen:
(Sweden) Anders Nyqvist
(Sweden) Ludvig Lundgren

11:53 – Lennström (Pudas, Sörensen)	1-0
21:56 – Häman Aktell (Brännström, Lindholm)	2-0
29:14 – Bengtsson (Rasmussen)	3-0
	3-1	60:00 – Leino (Kossila, Aaltonen)

8 min
Penalties
10 min
26
Shots
21

== Scoring leaders ==
Pos	Player	Country	GP	G	A	Pts	+/−	PIM	POS
1	Juhamatti Aaltonen	Finland	3	1	3	4	+4	0	RW
2	Ahti Oksanen	Finland	3	1	3	4	+3	0	LW
3	Arttu Ruotsalainen	Finland	3	0	3	3	+3	2	CE
4	Tommi Tikka	Finland	3	1	1	3	+2	2	RW
5	Michael Fora	Switzerland	3	1	2	3	+3	4	RD

GP = Games played; G = Goals; A = Assists; Pts = Points; +/− = Plus/minus; PIM = Penalties in minutes; POS = Position
Source: swehockey

== Goaltending leaders ==
Pos	Player	Country	TOI	GA	GAA	Sv%	SO
1	Aleš Stezka	Czech Republic	158:13	4	1.52	93.10	0
2	Sandro Aeschlimann	Switzerland	87:55	3	2.05	92.31	0
3	Lars Johansson	Sweden	120:35	3	1.49	91.43	0
4	Juha Jatkola	Finland	117:27	4	2.04	90.70	0

TOI = Time on ice (minutes:seconds); SA = Shots against; GA = Goals against; GAA = Goals Against Average; Sv% = Save percentage; SO = Shutouts
Source: swehockey
