= Zohorna =

Zohorna is a surname. Notable people with the surname include:

- Hynek Zohorna (born 1990), Czech ice hockey player
- Radim Zohorna (born 1996), Czech ice hockey player
- Tomáš Zohorna (born 1988), Czech ice hockey player, brother of Hynek and Radim
