= 2022–23 Euro Hockey Tour =

Ice hockey tournament

Tournament details
- Venues: 8 (in 8 host cities)
- Dates: 10 November 2022 – 7 May 2023
- Teams: 4

Final positions
- Champions: Sweden (6th title)
- Runners-up: Czech Republic
- Third place: Finland
- Fourth place: Switzerland

Tournament statistics
- Games played: 24
- Goals scored: 121 (5.04 per game)
- Attendance: 109,435 (4,560 per game)
- Scoring leader: (Czech Republic) Filip Chlapík (9 points)

The 2022–23 Euro Hockey Tour was the 27th season of Euro Hockey Tour. It started in November 2022 and ended in May 2023. It consisted of Karjala Tournament, Swiss Ice Hockey Games, Beijer Hockey Games and Carlson Hockey Games.

Switzerland made their Tour debut and replaced Russia, who was ejected mid-way through the 2021–22 Euro Hockey Tour in response to the Russian invasion of Ukraine. For the same reason, the Swiss Ice Hockey Games replaced the Channel One Cup.

== Standings ==
Pos	Team	Pld	W	OTW	OTL	L	GF	GA	GD	Pts
1	Sweden	12	5	4	1	2	35	22	+13	24
2	Czech Republic	12	4	2	2	4	26	33	−7	18
3	Finland	12	3	2	3	4	37	34	+3	16
4	Switzerland	12	2	2	4	4	23	32	−9	14

Source: Euro Hockey Tour

== Karjala Tournament ==
The Karjala Tournament was played between 10–13 November 2022. Five matches were played in Turku, Finland and one match in České Budějovice, Czech Republic. Tournament was won by Sweden.

Pos	Team	Pld	W	OTW	OTL	L	GF	GA	GD	Pts
1	Sweden	3	1	1	0	1	8	7	+1	5
2	Switzerland	3	0	2	1	0	8	7	+1	5
3	Czech Republic	3	1	0	1	1	8	9	−1	4
4	Finland	3	1	0	1	1	8	9	−1	4

Source: Leijonat.com

10 November 2022
Czech Republic	1–4	Sweden
Switzerland	3–2 (GWS)	Finland
12 November 2022
Sweden	3–2 (OT)	Switzerland
Finland	2–5	Czech Republic
13 November 2022
Czech Republic	2–3 (OT)	Switzerland
Finland	4–1	Sweden

== Swiss Ice Hockey Games ==
The 2022 Swiss Ice Hockey Games, replacing the Channel One Cup in the Tour, was played between 15–18 December 2022. Five matches were played in Fribourg, Switzerland and one match in Helsinki, Finland. The tournament was won by Sweden.

Pos	Team	Pld	W	OTW	OTL	L	GF	GA	GD	Pts
1	Sweden	3	1	2	0	0	11	5	+6	7
2	Czech Republic	3	2	0	0	1	5	7	−2	6
3	Finland	3	1	0	1	1	9	8	+1	4
4	Switzerland	3	0	0	1	2	4	9	−5	1

Source: Leijonat.com

15 December 2022
Finland	2–3	Czech Republic
Sweden	3–2 (OT)	Switzerland
17 December 2022
Finland	3–4 (GWS)	Sweden
Switzerland	1–2	Czech Republic
18 December 2022
Switzerland	1–4	Finland
Czech Republic	0–4	Sweden

== Beijer Hockey Games ==
The 2023 Beijer Hockey Games was played between 9–12 February 2023. Five matches were played in Malmö, Sweden and one match in Zürich, Switzerland. Tournament was won by Sweden.

Pos	Team	Pld	W	OTW	OTL	L	GF	GA	GD	Pts
1	Sweden	3	2	0	1	0	6	3	+3	7
2	Finland	3	1	1	0	1	13	9	+4	5
3	Czech Republic	3	0	2	0	1	5	8	−3	4
4	Switzerland	3	0	0	2	1	6	10	−4	2

Source: stats.swehockey.se

9 February 2023
Czech Republic	2–1 (OT)	Sweden
Switzerland	5–6 (GWS)	Finland
11 February 2023
Finland	6–1	Czech Republic
Sweden	2–0	Switzerland
12 February 2023
Switzerland	1–2 (OT)	Czech Republic
Sweden	3–1	Finland

== Carlson Hockey Games ==
The 2023 Carlson Hockey Games was played between 4–7 May 2023. Five matches were played in Czech Republic and one match in Gothenburg, Sweden.

Pos	Team	Pld	W	OTW	OTL	L	GF	GA	GD	Pts
1	Switzerland	3	2	0	0	1	5	6	−1	6
2	Sweden	3	1	1	0	1	10	7	+3	5
3	Czech Republic	3	1	0	1	1	8	9	−1	4
4	Finland	3	0	1	1	1	7	8	−1	3

Source: Leijonat.com

4 May 2023
Czech Republic	2–3 (OT)	Finland
Sweden	3–0	Switzerland
6 May 2023
Switzerland	2–1	Finland
Czech Republic	4–3	Sweden
7 May 2023
Sweden	4–3 (OT)	Finland
Czech Republic	2–3	Switzerland
