= Michael Špaček =

Michael Špaček may refer to:

- Michael Špaček (motorcyclist) (1991–2009), Czech youth motocross champion
- Michael Špaček (ice hockey) (born 1997), Czech ice hockey player
