= Tomáš Zohorna =

Czech ice hockey player

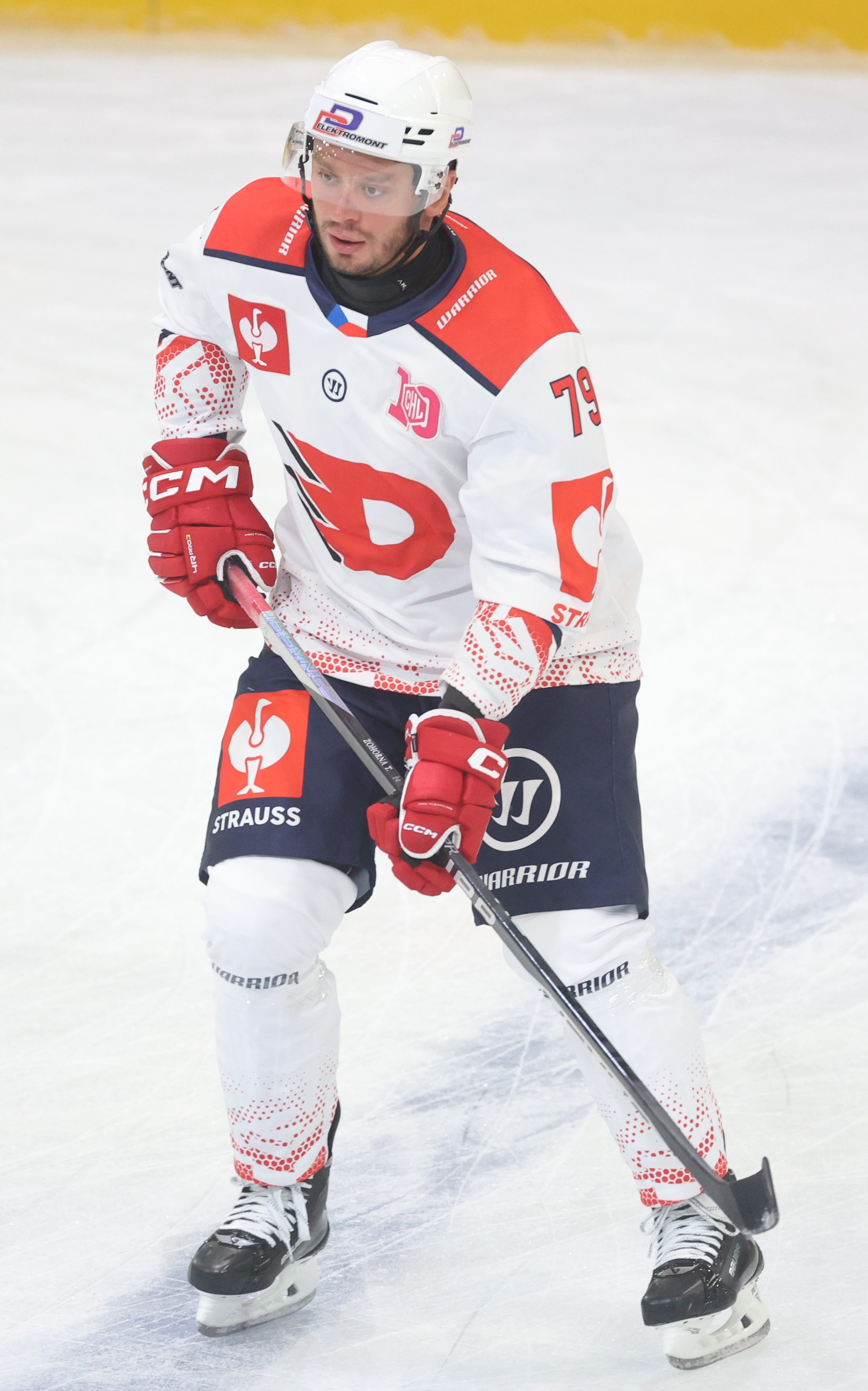
- Tomáš Zohorna, 2024
- Born: 3 January 1988 (age 37); Chotěboř, Czechoslovakia
- Height: 6 ft 0 in (183 cm)
- Weight: 196 lb (89 kg; 14 st 0 lb)
- Position: Forward
- Shoots: Left
- ELH team Former teams: HC Kometa Brno; HC Dynamo Pardubice; Amur Khabarovsk; IK Oskarshamn; Motor České Budějovice
- National team: Czech Republic
- NHL draft: Undrafted
- Playing career: 2007–present

Tomáš Zohorna (born 3 January 1988) is a Czech professional ice hockey player. He is currently under contract with HC Kometa Brno in the Czech Extraliga (ELH). He has two brothers, Radim and Hynek. They are hockey players too, they used to play for HC Kometa Brno.

He played major junior hockey in the Quebec Major Junior Hockey League with the Drummondville Voltigeurs. Undrafted by a National Hockey League club, he turned professional with HC Pardubice in the Czech Extraliga during the 2007–08 Czech Extraliga season.

== Career statistics ==
=== Regular season and playoffs ===
			Regular season					Playoffs
Season	Team	League	GP	G	A	Pts	PIM	GP	G	A	Pts	PIM
2003–04	HC Moeller Pardubice	CZE U18	51	26	22	48	108	—	—	—	—	—
2003–04	HC Moeller Pardubice	CZE U20	2	0	2	2	0	—	—	—	—	—
2004–05	HC Moeller Pardubice	CZE U18	36	30	39	69	89	4	1	2	3	8
2004–05	HC Moeller Pardubice	CZE U20	8	3	0	3	8	—	—	—	—	—
2005–06	Drummondville Voltigeurs	QMJHL	68	7	28	35	86	7	0	4	4	6
2006–07	Drummondville Voltigeurs	QMJHL	70	30	32	62	97	12	4	2	6	20
2007–08	HC Moeller Pardubice	CZE U20	1	0	0	0	0	3	1	1	2	8
2007–08	HC Moeller Pardubice	ELH	41	0	1	1	14	—	—	—	—	—
2007–08	HC VCES Hradec Králové, a.s.	Czech.1	6	2	0	2	2	—	—	—	—	—
2007–08	HC Chrudim	Czech.2	1	0	0	0	2	—	—	—	—	—
2008–09	HC Moeller Pardubice	ELH	21	2	4	6	8	7	0	1	1	0
2008–09	HC Chrudim	Czech.2	42	6	10	16	59	3	0	1	1	4
2009–10	HC Eaton Pardubice	ELH	49	14	10	24	36	13	1	2	3	12
2010–11	HC Eaton Pardubice	ELH	47	8	6	14	24	9	1	4	5	14
2010–11	HC Chrudim	Czech.2	4	0	3	3	14	—	—	—	—	—
2011–12	HC ČSOB Pojišťovna Pardubice	ELH	47	8	12	20	30	19	5	8	13	14
2011–12	HC VCES Hradec Králové, a.s.	Czech.1	1	1	0	1	0	—	—	—	—	—
2012–13	HC ČSOB Pojišťovna Pardubice	ELH	51	9	14	23	56	5	2	0	2	10
2013–14	HC ČSOB Pojišťovna Pardubice	ELH	52	18	19	37	104	10	2	6	8	10
2014–15	HC ČSOB Pojišťovna Pardubice	ELH	51	16	22	38	64	9	1	5	6	26
2015–16	Amur Khabarovsk	KHL	55	9	15	24	28	—	—	—	—	—
2016–17	Amur Khabarovsk	KHL	59	13	21	34	48	—	—	—	—	—
2017–18	Amur Khabarovsk	KHL	52	11	19	30	68	5	1	1	2	6
2018–19	Amur Khabarovsk	KHL	62	14	15	29	26	—	—	—	—	—
2019–20	Amur Khabarovsk	KHL	47	11	14	25	41	—	—	—	—	—
2020–21	Amur Khabarovsk	KHL	38	6	16	22	37	—	—	—	—	—
2020–21	HC Dynamo Pardubice	ELH	9	3	5	8	6	8	2	5	7	8
2021–22	IK Oskarshamn	SHL	51	12	19	31	38	10	2	6	8	2
2022–23	HC Dynamo Pardubice	ELH	40	15	23	38	48	11	5	1	6	11
2023–24	HC Dynamo Pardubice	ELH	50	6	20	26	35	16	3	6	9	16
2024–25	HC Dynamo Pardubice	ELH	12	2	2	4	8	—	—	—	—	—
2024–25	Motor České Budějovice	ELH	39	10	16	26	30	9	1	1	2	8
ELH totals			518	113	152	265	463	119	23	40	63	131
KHL totals			313	64	100	164	248	5	1	1	2	6

=== International ===
Year	Team	Event	Result	GP	G	A	Pts	PIM
2016	Czech Republic	WC	5th	8	3	1	4	2
2017	Czech Republic	WC	7th	8	1	1	2	2
2018	Czech Republic	OG	4th	6	0	0	0	2
2019	Czech Republic	WC	4th	9	1	0	1	10
2021	Czech Republic	WC	7th	5	0	0	0	2
2022	Czech Republic	OG	9th	4	0	1	1	0
Senior totals				40	5	3	8	16
