= Alex Grant (ice hockey) =

Canadian ice hockey player (born 1989)

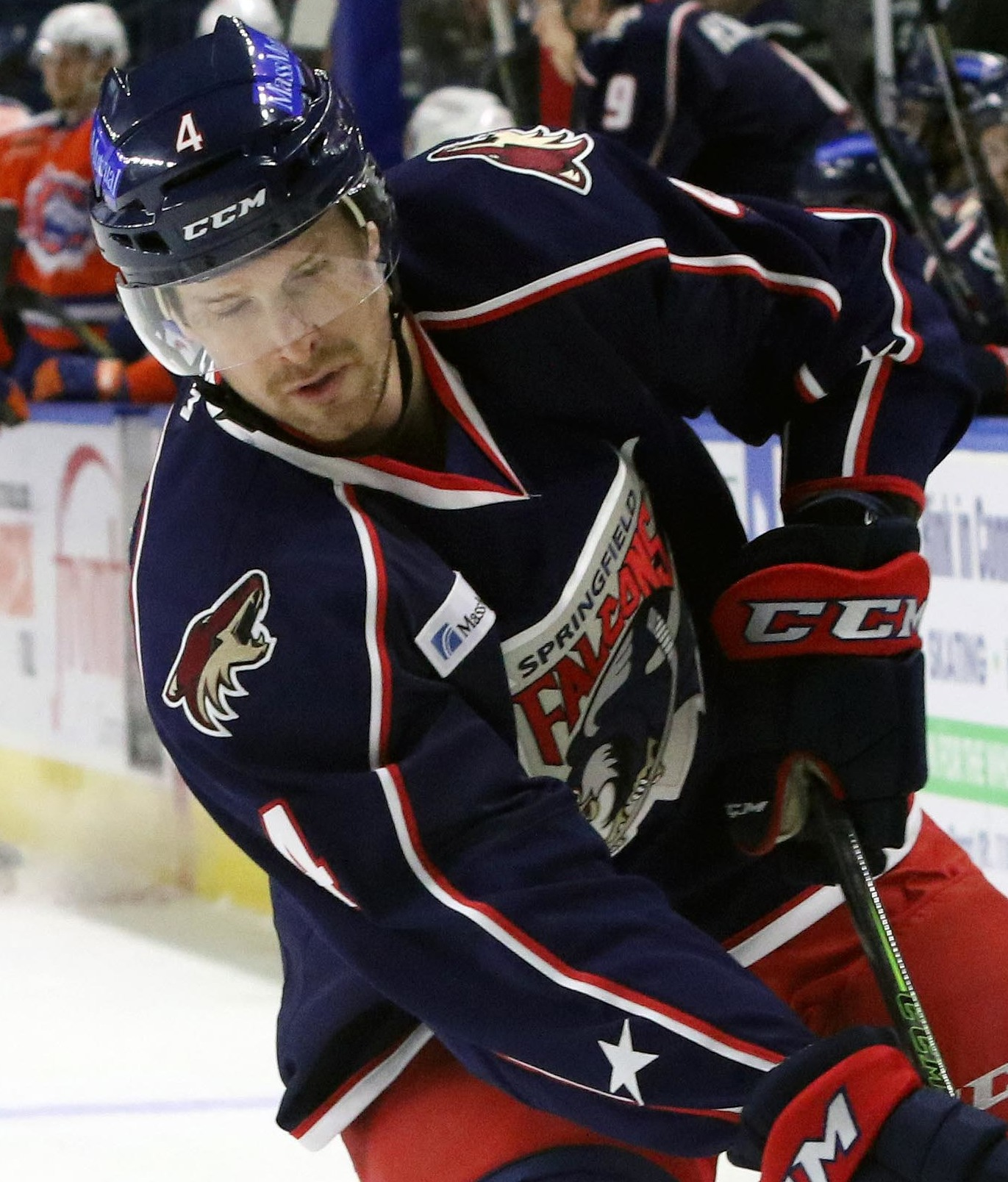
- Grant with the Springfield Falcons in 2015
- Born: January 20, 1989 (age 37) Antigonish, Nova Scotia, Canada
- Height: 6 ft 3 in (191 cm)
- Weight: 205 lb (93 kg; 14 st 9 lb)
- Position: Defence
- Shoots: Right
- team Former teams: Free agent Anaheim Ducks; Arizona Coyotes; Jokerit; SKA Saint Petersburg; Barys Astana; Avangard Omsk
- National team: Canada
- NHL draft: 118th overall, 2007; Pittsburgh Penguins
- Playing career: 2009–present

Alex Grant (born January 20, 1989) is a Canadian professional ice hockey defenceman. He is currently an unrestricted free agent. He most recently played under contract with Avangard Omsk in the Kontinental Hockey League (KHL). Grant was selected by the Pittsburgh Penguins in the 4th round (118th overall) of the 2007 NHL entry draft.

== Playing career ==
Grant was selected in the first round (first overall) of the 2005 QMJHL Entry Draft by the Saint John Sea Dogs, and played four seasons of major junior hockey in the Quebec Major Junior Hockey League with Saint John and the Shawinigan Cataractes.

On June 24, 2013, the Pittsburgh Penguins traded Grant to the Anaheim Ducks in exchange for winger Harry Zolnierczyk. He was re-signed to a one-year contract on July 10, 2013.

Grant scored his first goal in his first NHL game, on November 30, 2013, against Antti Niemi of the San Jose Sharks. Despite scoring a goal in his second successive game with the Ducks, on December 12, 2013, he was reassigned to the Norfolk Admirals of the American Hockey League. Approaching the trade deadline on March 5, 2014, Grant was traded by the Ducks to the Ottawa Senators in exchange for minor league right winger Andre Petersson.

On July 2, 2015, Grant signed a one-year, two-way contract as a free agent with the Arizona Coyotes.

On July 4, 2016, Grant signed a one-year, two-way deal as a free agent with the Boston Bruins. He spent the entire 2016–17 season in the AHL with affiliate, the Providence Bruins, first among the league's defensemen in scoring with 49 points in 70 games and second in goals scored with 17.

On July 1, 2017, Grant left the Bruins as a free agent to sign his third successive one-year, two-way contract with the Minnesota Wild. Grant was assigned to the Wild's AHL affiliate, the Iowa Wild for the duration of the 2017–18 season. In 73 games, he collected 13 goals and 36 points.

Grant signed a one-year contract with Finnish club, Jokerit of the Kontinental Hockey League on June 15, 2018.

After four seasons with Jokerit, Grant left the club after their withdrawal from the KHL due to the Russian invasion of Ukraine. As a free agent into the off-season, Grant opted to continue his tenure in the KHL, signing a one-year deal with Russian club, SKA Saint Petersburg, on July 1, 2022. In the 2022–23 season, Grant made just 16 appearances on the blueline with SKA before he was traded to Kazakhstani based club, Barys Astana, on November 22, 2022.

== International play ==
In January 2022, Grant was selected to play for Team Canada at the 2022 Winter Olympics.

== Career statistics ==
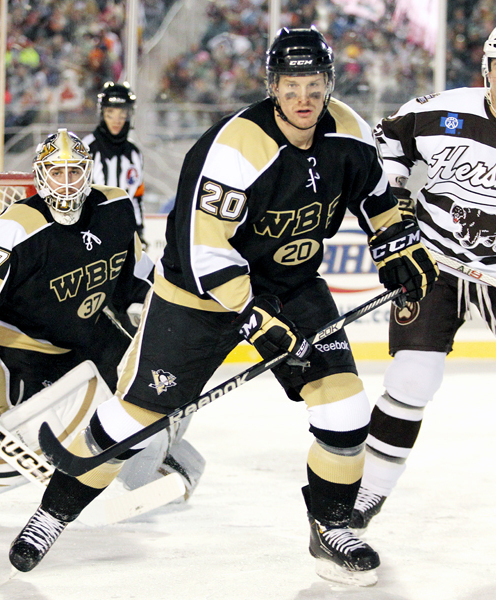
Grant with the Wilkes-Barre/Scranton Penguins in 2013

=== Regular season and playoffs ===
			Regular season					Playoffs
Season	Team	League	GP	G	A	Pts	PIM	GP	G	A	Pts	PIM
2004–05	Antigonish Bulldogs	MJAHL	50	7	9	16	36	—	—	—	—	—
2005–06	Saint John Sea Dogs	QMJHL	47	4	9	13	58	—	—	—	—	—
2006–07	Saint John Sea Dogs	QMJHL	68	12	20	32	108	—	—	—	—	—
2007–08	Saint John Sea Dogs	QMJHL	70	15	33	48	96	14	3	11	14	12
2008–09	Saint John Sea Dogs	QMJHL	37	9	22	31	51	—	—	—	—	—
2008–09	Shawinigan Cataractes	QMJHL	23	4	15	19	11	21	4	5	9	18
2009–10	Wheeling Nailers	ECHL	40	7	20	27	36	6	0	0	0	0
2009–10	Wilkes–Barre/Scranton Penguins	AHL	14	3	2	5	28	2	0	0	0	0
2010–11	Wheeling Nailers	ECHL	14	3	2	5	6	17	2	0	2	13
2010–11	Wilkes–Barre/Scranton Penguins	AHL	4	0	0	0	0	—	—	—	—	—
2011–12	Wilkes–Barre/Scranton Penguins	AHL	61	10	27	37	73	12	2	5	7	13
2012–13	Wilkes–Barre/Scranton Penguins	AHL	46	4	16	20	73	13	2	2	4	27
2013–14	Norfolk Admirals	AHL	52	7	20	27	46	—	—	—	—	—
2013–14	Anaheim Ducks	NHL	2	2	0	2	2	—	—	—	—	—
2013–14	Binghamton Senators	AHL	19	2	8	10	6	4	0	0	0	10
2014–15	Binghamton Senators	AHL	58	6	27	33	57	—	—	—	—	—
2015–16	Springfield Falcons	AHL	69	11	31	42	57	—	—	—	—	—
2015–16	Arizona Coyotes	NHL	5	0	0	0	7	—	—	—	—	—
2016–17	Providence Bruins	AHL	70	17	32	49	36	17	2	6	8	12
2017–18	Iowa Wild	AHL	73	13	23	36	79	—	—	—	—	—
2018–19	Jokerit	KHL	57	13	23	36	52	5	0	0	0	4
2019–20	Jokerit	KHL	43	5	14	19	14	4	0	1	1	2
2020–21	Jokerit	KHL	50	6	15	21	28	3	0	0	0	24
2021–22	Jokerit	KHL	27	5	7	12	17	—	—	—	—	—
2022–23	SKA Saint Petersburg	KHL	16	1	5	6	2	—	—	—	—	—
2022–23	Barys Astana	KHL	33	9	8	17	20	—	—	—	—	—
2023–24	Barys Astana	KHL	8	1	1	2	4	—	—	—	—	—
2024–25	Barys Astana	KHL	2	0	0	0	0	—	—	—	—	—
2024–25	Avangard Omsk	KHL	16	4	3	7	2	10	0	2	2	11
2025–26	Odense Bulldogs	DEN	19	2	6	8	4	12	5	3	8	4
AHL totals			466	73	186	259	455	48	6	13	19	62
NHL totals			7	2	0	2	9	—	—	—	—	—
KHL totals			252	44	76	120	139	22	0	3	3	41

=== International ===
Year	Team	Event	Result	GP	G	A	Pts	PIM
2005	Canada Atlantic	U17	3rd place, bronze medalist(s)	6	0	1	1	2
2006	Canada Atlantic	U17	6th	5	1	3	4	2
2006	Canada	IH18	1st place, gold medalist(s)	4	0	0	0	0
2007	Canada	WJC18	4th	6	0	0	0	0
2022	Canada	OG	6th	3	1	1	2	2
Junior totals				21	1	4	5	4
Senior totals				3	1	1	2	2
