= Adam Chlapík =

Czech ice hockey player

- Born: February 4, 1994 (age 31); Prague, Czech Republic
- Height: 5 ft 11 in (180 cm)
- Weight: 196 lb (89 kg; 14 st 0 lb)
- Position: Forward
- Shoots: Right
- team Former teams: Free agent HC Sparta Praha; HC Litvínov
- NHL draft: Undrafted
- Playing career: 2012–present

Adam Chlapík (born February 4, 1994) is a Czech professional ice hockey player. He is currently a free agent having last played with the HC Kobra Praha of the Czech 2. liga.

Chlapík previously played 24 games in the Czech Extraliga with HC Sparta Praha and HC Litvínov.

His brother Filip Chlapík is also a hockey player, currently playing within the Ottawa Senators organization in the NHL.
