= Radim Zohorna =

Czech ice hockey player

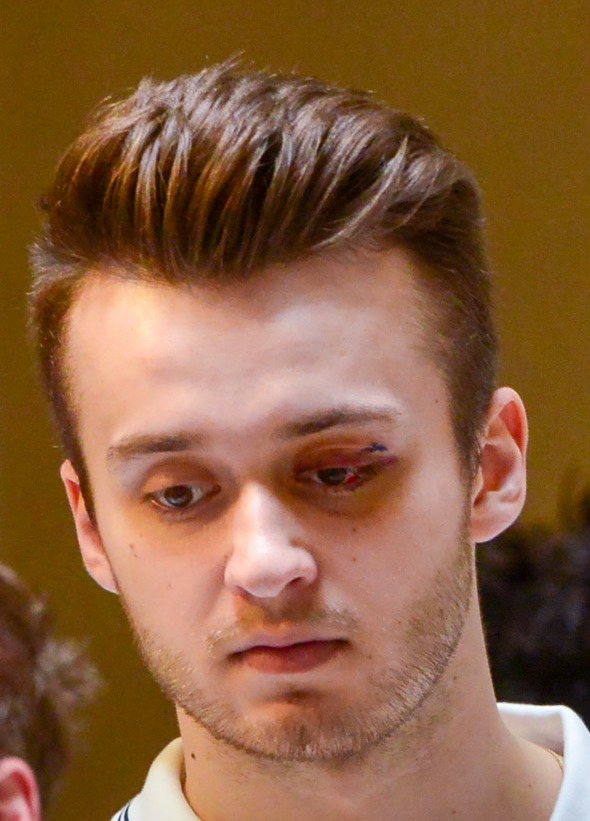
- Zohorna in 2018
- Born: 29 April 1996 (age 30) Havlíčkův Brod, Czech Republic
- Height: 6 ft 6 in (198 cm)
- Weight: 220 lb (100 kg; 15 st 10 lb)
- Position: Forward
- Shoots: Left
- SHL team Former teams: Färjestad BK; HC Kometa Brno; BK Mladá Boleslav; Pittsburgh Penguins; Calgary Flames; Toronto Maple Leafs; HC Lugano
- National team: Czech Republic
- NHL draft: Undrafted
- Playing career: 2014–present

Radim Zohorna (born 29 April 1996) is a Czech professional ice hockey player for Färjestad BK of the Swedish Hockey League (SHL).

== Playing career ==
Zohorna made his Czech Extraliga debut playing with HC Kometa Brno during the 2014–15 Czech Extraliga season. He won the Czech Extraliga Championship with HC Kometa Brno in 2017 and 2018. In 2019–20, he set a career high with 10 goals, 12 assists and 22 points in 56 games with third-placed BK Mladá Boleslav.

Following his sixth year in the Czech Extraliga, Zohorna was signed to a one-year, two-way contract with the Pittsburgh Penguins of the National Hockey League (NHL) on 30 April 2020. On 10 August 2020, Zohorna agreed to return to former Czech club BK Mladá Boleslav on loan until the commencement of the delayed 2020–21 North American season.

Zohorna made his NHL debut for Pittsburgh on 25 March 2021 against the Buffalo Sabres. He scored his first NHL goal on his first shot in that game. In his first North American season, he split time between Pittsburgh, the Penguins' taxi squad and their American Hockey League (AHL) affiliate, the Wilkes-Barre/Scranton Penguins. Zohorna appeared in eight NHL games, scoring two goals and four points. During the 2021–22 season, Zohorna again played with Wilkes-Barre/Scranton for the majority of the season, making his NHL season debut on 2 January 2022, recording a point against the San Jose Sharks. He was returned to the AHL after the game. He finished the season with 12 goals and 21 points in 39 regular season games and two goals and five points in the playoffs in the AHL and two goals and six points in 17 games in the NHL.

On 2 October 2022, Zohorna was placed on waivers for the purpose to be sent down to AHL for the 2022–23 season. However, he was claimed the next day by the Calgary Flames. He was with the Flames for six days before being placed on waivers again, this time going unclaimed and was assigned to Calgary's AHL affiliate, the Calgary Wranglers. He appeared in 20 games with the Wranglers, scoring five goals and 16 points before being recalled by the Flames to make his season debut against the Columbus Blue Jackets. On 3 March 2023, the Flames traded Zohorna to the Toronto Maple Leafs in exchange for Dryden Hunt. He was assigned to the Maple Leafs' AHL affiliate, the Toronto Marlies, before being recalled and making his Maple Leafs' debut on 1 April 2024 against the Ottawa Senators. He scored a goal in his debut with the Maple Leafs.

As an unrestricted free agent from the Maple Leafs, Zohorna opted to return to his original club, the Pittsburgh Penguins, in signing a one-year, two-way contract on 2 July 2023. Zohorna, despite having a good 2023 training camp with Pittsburgh, was placed on waivers and after going unclaimed, was assigned to Wilkes-Barre/Scranton to start the 2023–24 season. He was recalled by Pittsburgh and made his season debut with the Penguins against the St. Louis Blues on 22 October.

At the conclusion of his contract with the Penguins, Zohorna opted to return to Europe after securing a one-year contract with Swiss club HC Lugano on 11 July 2024.

On 9 May 2025, Zohorna signed a two-year contract with Färjestad BK of the Swedish Hockey League.

== Personal life ==
He has two brothers, Tomáš and Hynek, who are also professional ice hockey players.

== Career statistics ==
=== Regular season and playoffs ===
			Regular season					Playoffs
Season	Team	League	GP	G	A	Pts	PIM	GP	G	A	Pts	PIM
2013–14	HC Kometa Brno	Czech.20	11	3	5	8	4	—	—	—	—	—
2014–15	HC Kometa Brno	Czech.20	43	14	18	32	42	3	0	1	1	2
2014–15	HC Kometa Brno	ELH	10	0	1	1	10	—	—	—	—	—
2015–16	HC Kometa Brno	ELH	25	2	2	4	4	3	0	0	0	0
2015–16	SK Horácká Slavia Třebíč	Czech.1	33	6	5	11	10	—	—	—	—	—
2015–16	HC Kometa Brno	Czech.20	—	—	—	—	—	3	1	4	5	4
2016–17	HC Kometa Brno	ELH	14	2	0	2	4	4	1	0	1	0
2016–17	SK Horácká Slavia Třebíč	Czech.1	34	8	6	14	18	4	1	0	1	4
2017–18	HC Kometa Brno	ELH	30	8	6	14	14	14	3	4	7	8
2017–18	SK Horácká Slavia Třebíč	Czech.1	21	6	6	12	18	—	—	—	—	—
2018–19	HC Kometa Brno	ELH	35	1	5	6	12	—	—	—	—	—
2018–19	SK Horácká Slavia Třebíč	Czech.1	5	0	3	3	0	—	—	—	—	—
2018–19	BK Mladá Boleslav	ELH	13	5	1	6	4	9	3	1	4	18
2019–20	BK Mladá Boleslav	ELH	46	10	12	22	10	—	—	—	—	—
2020–21	BK Mladá Boleslav	ELH	21	12	10	22	12	—	—	—	—	—
2020–21	Wilkes-Barre/Scranton Penguins	AHL	12	3	8	11	4	—	—	—	—	—
2020–21	Pittsburgh Penguins	NHL	8	2	2	4	4	—	—	—	—	—
2021–22	Wilkes-Barre/Scranton Penguins	AHL	39	12	9	21	10	4	2	3	5	2
2021–22	Pittsburgh Penguins	NHL	17	2	4	6	4	—	—	—	—	—
2022–23	Calgary Wranglers	AHL	40	10	19	29	23	—	—	—	—	—
2022–23	Calgary Flames	NHL	8	0	0	0	0	—	—	—	—	—
2022–23	Toronto Marlies	AHL	11	2	3	5	20	7	0	3	3	2
2022–23	Toronto Maple Leafs	NHL	2	1	0	1	0	—	—	—	—	—
2023–24	Wilkes-Barre/Scranton Penguins	AHL	30	10	16	26	10	2	2	0	2	2
2023–24	Pittsburgh Penguins	NHL	33	4	3	7	18	—	—	—	—	—
2024–25	HC Lugano	NL	39	9	13	22	15	6	2	2	4	0
ELH totals			194	40	37	77	70	30	7	5	12	26
NHL totals			68	9	9	18	26	—	—	—	—	—

=== International ===
Year	Team	Event	Result	GP	G	A	Pts	PIM
2023	Czechia	WC	8th	3	0	0	0	0
Senior totals				3	0	0	0	0
