= Tommi Tikka =

Finnish ice hockey player

- Born: 28 August 1995 (age 31) Helsinki, Finland
- Height: 191 cm (6 ft 3 in)
- Weight: 90 kg (198 lb; 14 st 2 lb)
- Position: Forward
- Shoots: Left
- Liiga team Former teams: Oulun Kärpät; Sport; HPK; Ilves; HV71
- Playing career: 2013–present

Tommi Tikka (born 28 August 1995) is a Finnish professional ice hockey player for Oulun Kärpät in the Liiga.

== Playing career ==
Tikka made his Liiga debut playing with Vaasan Sport during the 2015-16 Liiga season. He has also appeared in the Liiga with HPK and Ilves.

Tikka had a two-season stint in the Swedish Hockey League (SHL) with HV71, before leaving the club as a free agent and returning to the Liiga on 12 June 2025.
