= Emil Heineman =

Swedish ice hockey player (born 2001)

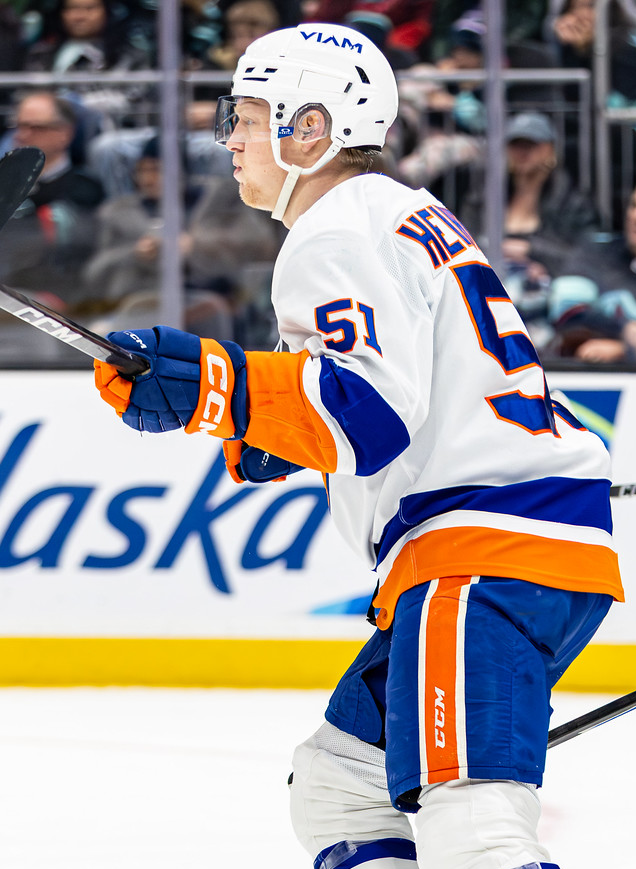
- Heineman with the New York Islanders in January 2026
- Born: 16 November 2001 (age 25) Leksand, Sweden
- Height: 6 ft 2 in (188 cm)
- Weight: 198 lb (90 kg; 14 st 2 lb)
- Position: Winger
- Shoots: Left
- NHL team Former teams: New York Islanders; Leksands IF; Montreal Canadiens
- National team: Sweden
- NHL draft: 43rd overall, 2020; Florida Panthers
- Playing career: 2019–present

Emil Heineman (born 16 November 2001) is a Swedish professional ice hockey player who is a winger for the New York Islanders of the National Hockey League (NHL). He was selected in the second round, 43rd overall, by the Florida Panthers in the 2020 NHL entry draft and has previously played for the Montreal Canadiens.

== Playing career ==
Heineman made his Swedish Hockey League (SHL) debut with Leksands IF during the 2019–20 SHL season. Thereafter, he was drafted by the Florida Panthers of the National Hockey League (NHL) in the second round of the 2020 NHL entry draft with the 43rd overall pick.

During his second season in the SHL with Leksands in 2020–21, on 12 April 2021, his NHL rights were traded by the Panthers along with a second-round draft selection in 2022 to the Calgary Flames in exchange for forward Sam Bennett and a sixth-round pick in 2022.

In the following 2021–22 season while overseas, Heineman's NHL rights were included in a trade package by the Flames along with forward Tyler Pitlick and draft picks to the Montreal Canadiens in exchange for forward Tyler Toffoli on 14 February 2022. In his first full season in the SHL, Heineman appeared in 38 regular season games, registering a career best 11 goals and 16 points. Thereafter, he was signed by the Canadiens to a three-year, entry-level contract commencing in the 2022–23 season on 4 April 2022. He likewise agreed to a professional tryout (PTO) to join their American Hockey League (AHL) affiliate, the Laval Rocket, for the remainder of the AHL season.

Heineman attended training camp with the Canadiens in September 2023, but was assigned to Laval to start the 2023–24 season. He would be recalled by Montreal on 13 December, and made his NHL debut in a 4–3 loss to the Minnesota Wild on 21 December. Heineman would appear in two games before being sent back to Laval. He was subsequently recalled again on 5 January 2024 on an emergency basis, and played in two additional games before being sent back to the AHL ranks on 11 January.

After making the Canadiens' opening night roster for the 2024–25 season, Heineman recorded his first NHL point when he scored on goaltender Linus Ullmark in a 4–1 victory over the Ottawa Senators on 12 October. Enjoying a productive rookie campaign where he ranked in the top-10 across league rookie scoring, he was involved in a pedestrian traffic accident on 13 January 2025 sidelining him for a period of three-to-four weeks with an upper-body injury.

In late June 2025, Heineman, along with two first round picks in that year's NHL entry draft, was traded by the Canadiens to the New York Islanders in exchange for defenceman Noah Dobson. Entering the off-season as a restricted free agent, he agreed to a two-year contract with the Islanders on 2 July.

== International play ==
Medal record

Men's ice hockey

Representing Sweden

World Championships
| Bronze medal – third place | 2025 Sweden/Denmark | |

Internationally, Heineman represented the Swedish national junior team at the 2021 World Junior Championships, where his country ultimately finished in fifth place following a 3–2 quarterfinals loss to Finland.

In May 2025, Heineman made his Swedish national senior team debut at that year's World Championship. Registering a total of three points across tournament play, he would secure a podium finish after defeating Denmark in the bronze medal game.

== Career statistics ==
=== Regular season and playoffs ===
| | | | Regular season | | | | | Playoffs |
| Season | Team | League | GP | G | A | Pts | PIM | GP | G | A | Pts | PIM |
|---|---|---|---|---|---|---|---|---|---|---|---|---|
| 2018–19 | Leksands IF | J20 | 27 | 1 | 4 | 5 | 6 | 2 | 0 | 0 | 0 | 2 |
| 2019–20 | Leksands IF | J20 | 29 | 26 | 15 | 41 | 12 | — | — | — | — | — |
| 2019–20 | Leksands IF | SHL | 11 | 0 | 2 | 2 | 4 | — | — | — | — | — |
| 2020–21 | Leksands IF | J20 | 1 | 0 | 0 | 0 | 0 | — | — | — | — | — |
| 2020–21 | Leksands IF | SHL | 43 | 7 | 6 | 13 | 14 | 4 | 0 | 1 | 1 | 0 |
| 2021–22 | Leksands IF | SHL | 38 | 11 | 5 | 16 | 20 | — | — | — | — | — |
| 2022–23 | Leksands IF | SHL | 35 | 8 | 7 | 15 | 10 | 3 | 0 | 0 | 0 | 0 |
| 2022–23 | Laval Rocket | AHL | 11 | 7 | 2 | 9 | 6 | 2 | 0 | 0 | 0 | 2 |
| 2023–24 | Laval Rocket | AHL | 48 | 15 | 14 | 29 | 25 | — | — | — | — | — |
| 2023–24 | Montreal Canadiens | NHL | 4 | 0 | 0 | 0 | 0 | — | — | — | — | — |
| 2024–25 | Montreal Canadiens | NHL | 62 | 10 | 8 | 18 | 20 | 5 | 1 | 0 | 1 | 0 |
| 2025–26 | New York Islanders | NHL | 82 | 22 | 9 | 31 | 18 | — | — | — | — | — |
| SHL totals | | | 127 | 26 | 20 | 46 | 48 | 7 | 0 | 1 | 1 | 0 |
| NHL totals | | | 148 | 32 | 17 | 49 | 38 | 5 | 1 | 0 | 1 | 0 |

=== International ===
| Year | Team | Event | Result | GP | G | A | Pts | PIM |
|---|---|---|---|---|---|---|---|---|
| 2021 | Sweden | WJC | 5th | 5 | 1 | 0 | 1 | 4 |
| 2025 | Sweden | WC | 3rd place, bronze medalist(s) | 10 | 1 | 2 | 3 | 4 |
| 2026 | Sweden | WC | 7th | 8 | 0 | 3 | 3 | 0 |
| Junior totals | | | | 5 | 1 | 0 | 1 | 4 |
| Senior totals | | | | 18 | 1 | 5 | 6 | 4 |
