= Gaëtan Haas =

Swiss ice hockey player (born 1992)

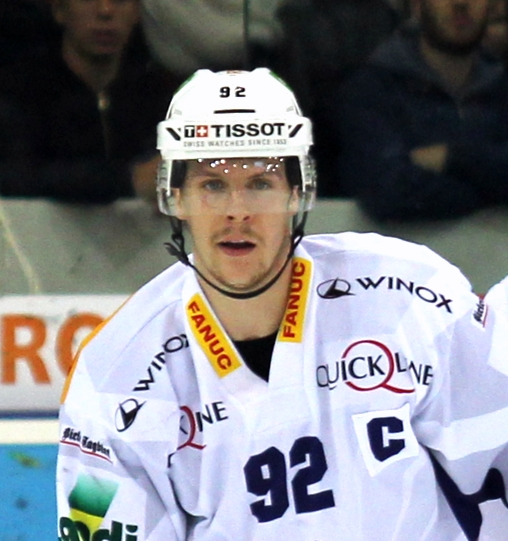
- Haas with EHC Biel in 2016
- Born: 31 January 1992 (age 34) Biel/Bienne, Switzerland
- Height: 5 ft 11 in (180 cm)
- Weight: 176 lb (80 kg; 12 st 8 lb)
- Position: Centre
- Shoots: Right
- NL team Former teams: EHC Biel; SC Bern; Edmonton Oilers
- National team: Switzerland
- NHL draft: Undrafted
- Playing career: 2009–present

Gaëtan Haas (born 31 January 1992) is a Swiss professional ice hockey centre who currently serves as captain of EHC Biel of the National League (NL). Haas previously played in the National Hockey League (NHL) with the Edmonton Oilers. He won one NL title with SC Bern in 2019.

== Playing career ==
In the midst of the 2016–17 season, his eighth professional season with EHC Biel, on 10 November 2016, he agreed to a three-year contract with SC Bern worth CHF 1.2 million. The contract started from the 2017–18 season and ran through the 2019–20 season. In his first season with SC Bern, Haas drew attention from the Calgary Flames, Montreal Canadiens and Chicago Blackhawks of the National Hockey League (NHL).

On 28 January 2019, Haas agreed to an early one-year contract extension worth CHF 800,000 with SC Bern through the 2020–21 season.

Undrafted, Haas, in the following off-season, used his NHL out clause with SC Bern to sign a one-year, entry-level contract with the Edmonton Oilers of the NHL on 1 July 2019. Haas made the Oilers' opening night roster, playing in his first NHL game on 3 October. He went on to score his first NHL goal on 5 November against the Arizona Coyotes after a short two-game stint with the Bakersfield Condors of the American Hockey League (AHL).

On 28 April 2020, Haas agreed to a one-year contract extension with the Oilers worth $915,000.

Haas was loaned to SC Bern for the start of the 2020–21 season. He played 14 games with Bern before returning to Edmonton at the end of December.

On 10 June 2021, Haas returned to EHC Biel on a five-year deal.

On August 27, 2021, Haas was named captain of EHC Biel.

== International play ==
Medal record

Representing Switzerland

Ice hockey

World Championships
Silver medal – second place	2018 Denmark	
Silver medal – second place	2024 Czechia	

World Junior A Challenge
Bronze medal – third place	2010 Penticton	

Haas participated at the 2012 World Junior Ice Hockey Championships as a member of the Switzerland men's national junior ice hockey team.

Haas was named to Switzerland men's team for the 2016, 2017, 2018 and 2019 World Championships. He also made the 2018 Winter Olympics team.

He represented Switzerland at the 2024 IIHF World Championship and won a silver medal.

== Career statistics ==
=== Regular season and playoffs ===
			Regular season					Playoffs
Season	Team	League	GP	G	A	Pts	PIM	GP	G	A	Pts	PIM
2006–07	EHC Biel	SUI U17	24	20	26	46	32	—	—	—	—	—
2007–08	EHC Biel	SUI U17	19	14	27	41	57	—	—	—	—	—
2007–08	EHC Biel	SUI.2 U20	32	7	20	27	36	4	1	4	5	4
2008–09	EHC Biel	SUI U17	31	21	31	52	46	6	4	2	6	4
2008–09	EHC Biel	SUI.2 U20	15	10	33	43	20	7	0	7	7	8
2009–10	EHC Biel	SUI U20	33	11	32	43	67	—	—	—	—	—
2009–10	EHC Biel	NLA	14	2	1	3	6	—	—	—	—	—
2010–11	EHC Biel	SUI U20	13	10	21	31	8	—	—	—	—	—
2010–11	EHC Biel	NLA	29	0	0	0	4	—	—	—	—	—
2010–11	HC Ajoie	NLB	1	0	0	0	0	—	—	—	—	—
2011–12	EHC Biel	SUI U20	1	0	1	1	2	—	—	—	—	—
2011–12	EHC Biel	NLA	43	6	7	13	10	5	0	1	1	2
2012–13	EHC Biel	NLA	49	2	7	9	8	—	—	—	—	—
2013–14	EHC Biel	NLA	29	4	2	6	12	—	—	—	—	—
2014–15	EHC Biel	NLA	49	8	16	24	20	7	1	2	3	4
2015–16	EHC Biel	NLA	38	9	16	25	8	—	—	—	—	—
2016–17	EHC Biel	NLA	44	11	22	33	4	1	0	0	0	0
2017–18	SC Bern	NL	47	15	26	41	18	11	2	6	8	2
2018–19	SC Bern	NL	50	15	23	38	14	9	4	3	7	2
2019–20	Edmonton Oilers	NHL	58	5	5	10	6	1	0	0	0	0
2019–20	Bakersfield Condors	AHL	2	0	1	1	0	—	—	—	—	—
2020–21	SC Bern	NL	14	5	3	8	4	—	—	—	—	—
2020–21	Edmonton Oilers	NHL	34	2	1	3	10	2	0	0	0	4
2021–22	EHC Biel	NL	37	6	16	22	8	7	0	2	2	4
2022–23	EHC Biel	NL	46	12	21	33	26	17	4	7	11	7
2023–24	EHC Biel	NL	45	12	19	31	22	8	2	1	3	2
2024–25	EHC Biel	NL	5	1	0	1	0	—	—	—	—	—
NL totals			539	108	179	287	164	65	13	27	40	23
NHL totals			92	7	6	13	16	3	0	0	0	4

=== International ===
Year	Team	Event	Result	GP	G	A	Pts	PIM
2009	Switzerland	WJC18	8th	6	2	3	5	0
2010	Switzerland	WJC18	5th	6	0	2	2	2
2011	Switzerland	WJC	5th	6	0	0	0	0
2012	Switzerland	WJC	8th	6	3	0	3	2
2016	Switzerland	WC	11th	3	0	0	0	2
2017	Switzerland	WC	6th	8	2	1	3	0
2018	Switzerland	OG	10th	4	0	1	1	0
2018	Switzerland	WC	2nd place, silver medalist(s)	10	3	2	5	0
2019	Switzerland	WC	8th	8	1	2	3	2
2022	Switzerland	OG	8th	5	1	1	2	0
2023	Switzerland	WC	5th	8	1	5	6	0
2024	Switzerland	WC	2nd place, silver medalist(s)	5	0	1	1	0
Junior totals				24	5	5	10	4
Senior totals				51	8	13	21	4

== Awards and honours ==
Award	Year
NL
All-Star Team	2018, 2019
Champion	2019
