= Teemu Hartikainen =

Finnish ice hockey player (born 1990)

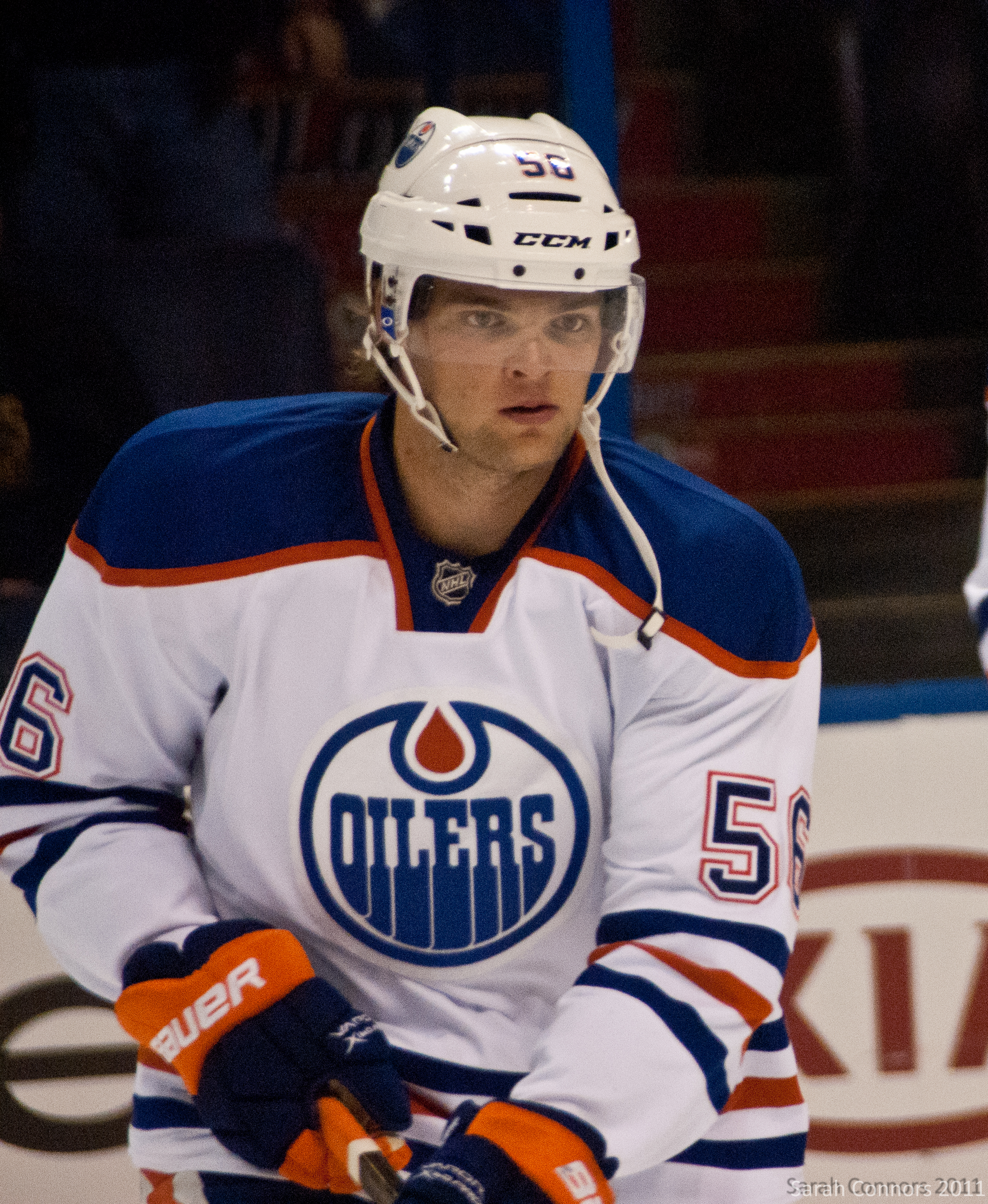
- Born: 3 May 1990 (age 36) Kuopio, Finland
- Height: 6 ft 1 in (185 cm)
- Weight: 220 lb (100 kg; 15 st 10 lb)
- Position: Left wing
- Shoots: Left
- Liiga team Former teams: KalPa; Edmonton Oilers; Salavat Yulaev Ufa; Genève-Servette HC
- National team: Finland
- NHL draft: 163rd overall, 2008; Edmonton Oilers
- Playing career: 2008–present

Teemu Hartikainen (born 3 May 1990) is a Finnish professional ice hockey player who is currently playing with KalPa in the Liiga. He previously played with Genève-Servette HC of the National League (NL).

== Playing career ==
In nine games with the KalPa U18 squad in 2006–07, the winger tallied five goals and 11 points, adding another three points (2g+1a) in 11 games with the U20 team. During the 2007–08 season, Hartikainen appeared with three different KalPa squads this season. In seven games with the U18 squad, he netted a career-high nine goals and 15 points, adding another 17 points (10g+7a) in 37 games with the U20 KalPa team; he failed to register any points in his lone game with the KalPa SM-Liiga team. H also suited up for six games with the Finland National U18 team, netting two goals and three points at the WJC-18.

Hartikainen was drafted 163rd overall by the Edmonton Oilers in the 2008 NHL entry draft. In 2008–09, the Finnish winger continued his hockey career within the KalPa system, appearing in his first full season with the teams SM-Liiga squad. In 51 games, he scored a career-high 23 points (17g+6a), taking the SM-Liiga Most Goals by Rookie and Rookie of the Year awards. He also potted another nine points (3g+6a) at the WJC with Team Finland.

Hartikainen played three seasons in the SM-liiga for KalPa before joining the Oiler American Hockey League affiliate, the Oklahoma City Barons, for the 2010–11 AHL season. Hartikainen was named the AHL's Rookie of the Month in January 2011. On 14 March 2011, Hartikainen was recalled from the Oklahoma City Barons by the Oilers. On 17 March 2011, Hartikainen made his NHL debut in a 3–1 loss against the Phoenix Coyotes, he recorded an assist on a third period power play goal by Magnus Paajarvi. On 26 March, Hartikainen scored his first NHL goal against Calgary netminder Miikka Kiprusoff in a 5-4 Shootout loss against the Calgary Flames.

On 10 June 2013, after three years of attempting to make it on the Oilers' full-time roster, Hartikainen left the Oilers as he signed a contract in the Russian KHL with Salavat Yulaev Ufa. On 31 January 2014, Hartikainen's NHL rights were traded by the Oilers to the Toronto Maple Leafs in exchange for Mark Fraser.

In March 2022, Hartikainen left Salavat Yulaev after the first match the playoffs due to the Russian invasion of Ukraine.

== Career statistics ==
=== Regular season and playoffs ===
			Regular season					Playoffs
Season	Team	League	GP	G	A	Pts	PIM	GP	G	A	Pts	PIM
2006–07	KalPa	FIN.2 U18	19	24	13	37	51	—	—	—	—	—
2006–07	KalPa	Jr. A	11	2	1	3	0	3	0	0	0	4
2007–08	KalPa	FIN U18	7	9	6	15	6	—	—	—	—	—
2007–08	KalPa	Jr. A	37	10	7	17	24	11	1	4	5	6
2007–08	KalPa	SM-l	1	0	0	0	0	—	—	—	—	—
2008–09	KalPa	SM-l	51	17	6	23	12	12	3	0	3	0
2008–09	Team Finland U20	Mestis	3	0	2	2	8	—	—	—	—	—
2009–10	KalPa	SM-l	53	15	18	33	22	13	6	1	7	28
2009–10	Team Finland U20	Mestis	1	0	0	0	0	—	—	—	—	—
2010–11	Oklahoma City Barons	AHL	66	17	25	42	27	6	0	1	1	4
2010–11	Edmonton Oilers	NHL	12	3	2	5	4	—	—	—	—	—
2011–12	Oklahoma City Barons	AHL	51	14	18	32	19	14	4	4	8	4
2011–12	Edmonton Oilers	NHL	17	2	3	5	6	—	—	—	—	—
2012–13	Oklahoma City Barons	AHL	47	14	23	37	23	17	7	8	15	6
2012–13	Edmonton Oilers	NHL	23	1	2	3	6	—	—	—	—	—
2013–14	Salavat Yulaev Ufa	KHL	47	14	16	30	32	18	2	6	8	10
2014–15	Salavat Yulaev Ufa	KHL	60	15	25	40	26	5	2	2	4	2
2015–16	Salavat Yulaev Ufa	KHL	54	10	29	39	22	19	4	3	7	14
2016–17	Salavat Yulaev Ufa	KHL	46	19	17	36	37	—	—	—	—	—
2017–18	Salavat Yulaev Ufa	KHL	55	20	21	41	26	14	4	7	11	12
2018–19	Salavat Yulaev Ufa	KHL	59	17	28	45	24	17	8	13	21	6
2019–20	Salavat Yulaev Ufa	KHL	57	21	15	36	30	6	5	1	6	0
2020–21	Salavat Yulaev Ufa	KHL	53	28	36	64	18	9	4	2	6	0
2021–22	Salavat Yulaev Ufa	KHL	41	13	11	24	4	1	0	1	1	0
2022–23	Genève–Servette HC	NL	48	28	15	43	24	18	8	4	12	6
2023–24	Genève–Servette HC	NL	51	8	24	32	14	2	1	0	1	0
2024–25	Genève–Servette HC	NL	42	25	23	48	35	—	—	—	—	—
2025–26	KalPa	Liiga	49	18	21	39	20	11	2	2	4	8
Liiga totals			154	50	45	95	54	36	11	3	14	36
NHL totals			52	6	7	13	16	—	—	—	—	—
KHL totals			472	157	198	355	219	89	29	35	64	44

Medal record

Representing Finland

Ice hockey

Olympic Games
Gold medal – first place	2022 Beijing	

World Championships
Gold medal – first place	2022 Finland	

=== International ===
Year	Team	Event	Result	GP	G	A	Pts	PIM
2008	Finland	WJC18	6th	6	2	1	3	6
2009	Finland	WJC	7th	6	3	6	9	4
2010	Finland	WJC	5th	6	4	2	6	4
2015	Finland	WC	6th	4	1	0	1	0
2018	Finland	OG	6th	4	0	1	1	0
2022	Finland	OG	1st place, gold medalist(s)	6	2	5	7	0
2022	Finland	WC	1st place, gold medalist(s)	10	0	6	6	0
2023	Finland	WC	7th	8	4	1	5	4
Junior totals				18	9	9	18	14
Senior totals				32	7	13	19	4
