= André Petersson =

Swedish ice hockey player (born 1990)

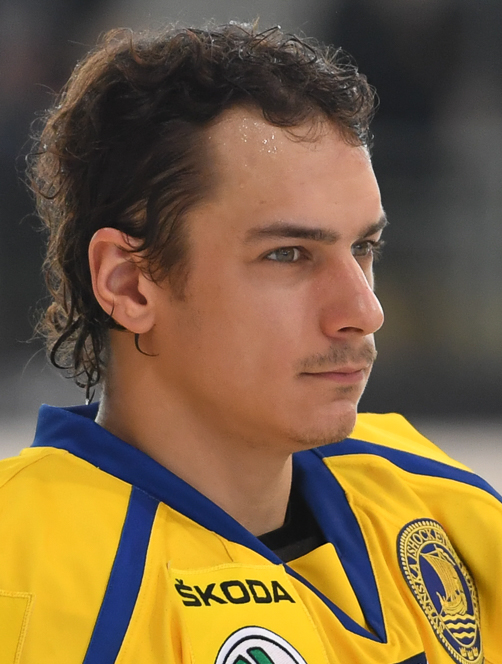
- Born: 11 September 1990 (age 35) Olofström, Sweden
- Height: 178 cm (5 ft 10 in)
- Weight: 80 kg (176 lb; 12 st 8 lb)
- Position: Right wing
- Shoots: Right
- NL team Former teams: SCL Tigers; HV71; Ottawa Senators; HC Sochi; Avangard Omsk; Barys Astana; Dynamo Moscow; Lokomotiv Yaroslavl
- National team: Sweden
- NHL draft: 109th overall, 2008; Ottawa Senators
- Playing career: 2007–present

André Willy Petersson (born 11 September 1990) is a Swedish professional ice hockey player who is a right winger for SCL Tigers of the National League (NL). He was selected by the Ottawa Senators in the fourth round, 109th overall, of the 2008 NHL entry draft, and played for them for only one National Hockey League (NHL) game.

== Playing career ==
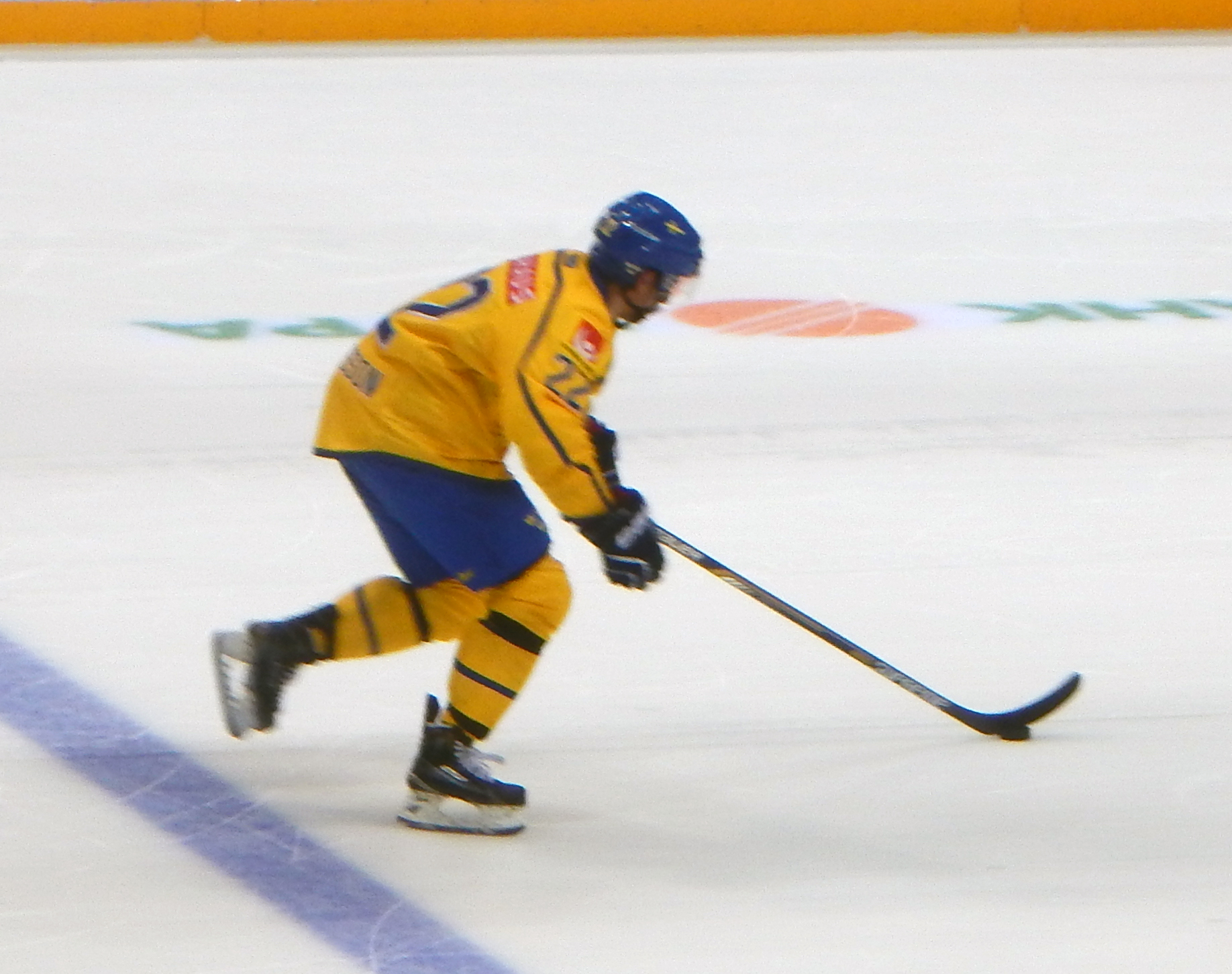
Petersson scores his PSO shot against Finland (2015 Channel One Cup)

Petersson won the Swedish junior championship and the regular Swedish championship with HV71 in 2009 and 2010, respectively. He has twice played in the IIHF World U20 Championship and won the silver medal in 2009 and the bronze medal in 2010.

Petersson began the 2011–12 season in North America, playing with Ottawa's top farm team, the Binghamton Senators of the American Hockey League. He was called up to Ottawa on 17 January 2012, and made his National Hockey League debut on 21 January against the Anaheim Ducks. Petersson had a good first season with Binghamton, scoring 23 goals and 21 assists to place second on the team in scoring. As the 2012–13 season started with an NHL lockout and no NHL training camp, Petersson started with Binghamton and had 2 goals and 3 assists before injuring his hip and ending his season early.

On 5 March 2014, Petersson was traded by the Senators to the Anaheim Ducks in exchange for defenseman Alex Grant. He was immediately assigned to AHL affiliate, the Norfolk Admirals where he remained for the duration of the season.

On 16 June 2014, as a restricted free agent from the Ducks, Petersson opted to return to Europe in signing a one-year contract for Russian club, HC Sochi for their inaugural season.

After spending the 2017–18 season with Avangard Omsk, registering 10 goals and 27 points in 40 games, Petersson continued his career in the KHL by signing a one-year contract with Barys Astana on 13 June 2018. He recorded a productive 23 goals and 45 points in 51 games for the Kazakh-based club in the 2018–19 season.

As a free agent, Petersson left Barys to sign a one-year contract to continue in the KHL with HC Dynamo Moscow on 16 June 2019. In the following 2019–20 season, Petersson added 17 goals and 39 points through 47 games. He led the team with 5 goals in their first-round victory over rivals Spartak Moscow before the remainder of the playoffs were cancelled due to the COVID-19 pandemic.

On 4 May 2020, Petersson as a free agent signed a two-year contract with his fifth KHL club, Lokomotiv Yaroslavl.

In the 2021–22 season, Petersson appeared in just 6 games with Lokomotiv before returning to his former club, Dynamo Moscow, on 27 December 2021. He appeared in a further 2 regular season games before advancing to the playoffs with Dynamo. He posted 1 point through 6 playoff contests before leaving the club during their conference semifinals against CSKA Moscow due to the 2022 Russian invasion of Ukraine on 16 March 2022.

On 23 June 2022, Petersson opted to return to his original Swedish club, HV71 of the SHL, in agreeing to a three-year deal.

On 19 June 2025, it was announced that André Petersson would once again leave HV71 for the upcoming season. On 4 July, it was announced that he signed with the SCL Tigers of the NL.

== Career statistics ==
=== Regular season and playoffs ===
			Regular season					Playoffs
Season	Team	League	GP	G	A	Pts	PIM	GP	G	A	Pts	PIM
2008–09	HV71	SEL	10	0	1	1	0	—	—	—	—	—
2009–10	HV71	SEL	37	10	5	15	14	6	0	1	1	2
2009–10	Borås HC	Allsv	1	1	0	1	0	—	—	—	—	—
2010–11	HV71	SEL	31	8	4	12	18	—	—	—	—	—
2011–12	Binghamton Senators	AHL	60	23	21	44	20	—	—	—	—	—
2011–12	Ottawa Senators	NHL	1	0	0	0	0	—	—	—	—	—
2012–13	Binghamton Senators	AHL	17	2	3	5	16	—	—	—	—	—
2013–14	Binghamton Senators	AHL	47	17	23	40	28	—	—	—	—	—
2013–14	Norfolk Admirals	AHL	18	6	8	14	8	10	3	3	6	2
2014–15	HC Sochi	KHL	54	20	18	38	32	4	1	0	1	2
2015–16	HC Sochi	KHL	45	22	22	44	26	4	1	0	1	2
2016–17	HC Sochi	KHL	39	14	15	29	22	—	—	—	—	—
2017–18	Avangard Omsk	KHL	40	10	17	27	18	6	5	2	7	4
2018–19	Barys Astana	KHL	51	23	22	45	42	8	3	2	5	18
2019–20	Dynamo Moscow	KHL	47	17	22	39	28	6	5	1	6	4
2020–21	Lokomotiv Yaroslavl	KHL	42	15	14	29	20	11	3	5	8	10
2021–22	Lokomotiv Yaroslavl	KHL	6	0	3	3	2	—	—	—	—	—
2021–22	Dynamo Moscow	KHL	2	0	1	1	0	6	0	1	1	2
2022–23	HV71	SHL	47	21	21	42	16	—	—	—	—	—
2023–24	HV71	SHL	29	12	9	21	16	—	—	—	—	—
2024–25	HV71	SHL	40	14	10	24	10	—	—	—	—	—
2025–26	SCL Tigers	NL	45	24	16	40	10	—	—	—	—	—
SHL totals			194	65	50	115	74	6	0	1	1	2
NHL totals			1	0	0	0	0	—	—	—	—	—
KHL totals			326	121	134	255	190	45	18	11	29	42

=== International ===
Medal record

Men's ice hockey

Representing Sweden

World Junior Championships
Silver medal – second place	2009 Canada	
Bronze medal – third place	2010 Canada	

Year	Team	Event	Result	GP	G	A	Pts	PIM
2007	Sweden	U18	3rd place, bronze medalist(s)	5	0	2	2	0
2009	Sweden	U18	4th	6	4	4	8	2
2009	Sweden	WJC	2nd place, silver medalist(s)	6	3	3	6	2
2010	Sweden	WJC	3rd place, bronze medalist(s)	6	8	3	11	4
2023	Sweden	WC	6th	7	2	4	6	6
2026	Sweden	WC	7th	4	0	0	0	0
Junior totals				23	15	12	27	8
Senior totals				11	2	4	6	6
