= Marcus Högberg =

Swedish ice hockey player (born 1994)

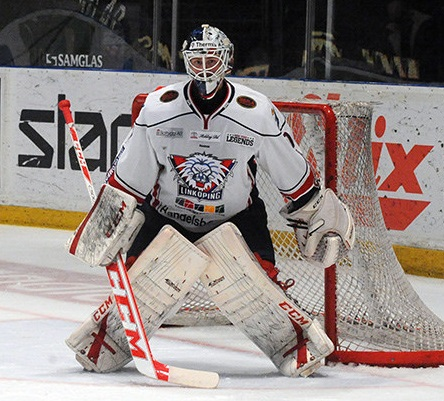
- Högberg with Linköping HC in 2014
- Born: 25 November 1994 (age 31) Örebro, Sweden
- Height: 6 ft 5 in (196 cm)
- Weight: 232 lb (105 kg; 16 st 8 lb)
- Position: Goaltender
- Catches: Left
- SHL team Former teams: Linköping HC; Ottawa Senators; New York Islanders
- National team: Sweden
- NHL draft: 78th overall, 2013; Ottawa Senators
- Playing career: 2013–present

Marcus Högberg (born 25 November 1994) is a Swedish professional ice hockey player who is a goaltender for Linköping HC of the Swedish Hockey League (SHL). Högberg was selected by the Ottawa Senators in the third round (78th overall) of the 2013 NHL entry draft.

== Playing career ==
Högberg made his Swedish Hockey League debut playing with Linköping HC during the 2012–13 season. On 17 March 2013, it was announced that Linköping would loan Högberg to Mora IK of the lower HockeyAllsvenskan for the duration of the 2013–14 season.

After his fourth season in the SHL, Högberg was signed to a two-year entry-level contract with the Ottawa Senators on 30 March 2017. He was signed by AHL affiliate, the Binghamton Senators, to a professional try-out deal to close out the 2016–17 season.

Högberg split most of the 2017–18 season between the AHL Belleville Senators and the Senators ECHL team, the Brampton Beast.

Högberg began the 2018–19 season with the Belleville Senators. However, before he was able to play a game for the Senators that season, he was reassigned to the ECHL on 27 November. After being recalled to the AHL, and playing in seven games, Högberg was recalled to the NHL on 22 December 2018. He was shortly thereafter reassigned to the AHL but eventually made his NHL debut on 29 December against the Washington Capitals. He made 21 saves in the 3–2 loss to the Capitals.

On 19 June 2019, Högberg was signed to a two-year contract extension, with the second year on a one-way basis with the Senators at $700,000.

As an impending free agent from the Senators after five seasons within the organization, Högberg opted to return to his original Swedish club, Linköping HC of the SHL, by agreeing to a four-year contract on 17 June 2021.

Following the 2023–24 season and having compiled three successful years with Linköping HC, Högberg exercised his NHL out clause from the remaining year of his contract in the SHL, by signing a two-year, $1.55 million contract with the New York Islanders on 7 May 2024. On 11 January 2025, Högberg earned his first win with the Islanders, when they beat the Utah Hockey Club 2–1.

On 29 April 2026, Högberg signed a three-year deal with Linköping HC of the SHL, which marks his third stint with the team.

== Career statistics ==
=== Regular season and playoffs ===
			Regular season									Playoffs
Season	Team	League	GP	W	L	OT	MIN	GA	SO	GAA	SV%	GP	W	L	MIN	GA	SO	GAA	SV%
2010–11	Linköpings HC	J20	4	—	—	—	163	12	0	4.42	.840	—	—	—	—	—	—	—	—
2011–12	Linköpings HC	J20	35	22	12	0	2,055	85	4	2.45	.919	6	6	0	366	10	2	1.64	.939
2012–13	Linköpings HC	J20	23	13	9	0	1,369	55	2	2.41	.917	—	—	—	—	—	—	—	—
2012–13	Linköpings HC	SHL	3	1	1	0	140	6	0	2.57	.885	—	—	—	—	—	—	—	—
2013–14	Linköpings HC	J20	5	4	1	0	304	14	0	2.76	.906	—	—	—	—	—	—	—	—
2013–14	Linköpings HC	SHL	4	4	0	0	222	4	0	1.08	.960	11	4	5	569	28	2	2.95	.913
2013–14	Mora IK	Allsv	15	5	8	0	778	38	0	2.93	.892	—	—	—	—	—	—	—	—
2014–15	Linköpings HC	J20	1	1	0	0	63	1	0	0.95	.957	—	—	—	—	—	—	—	—
2014–15	Linköpings HC	SHL	27	12	12	0	1,463	56	3	2.30	.917	6	1	4	283	15	0	3.18	.903
2014–15	IK Oskarshamn	Allsv	2	2	0	0	123	6	0	2.92	.914	—	—	—	—	—	—	—	—
2015–16	Linköpings HC	SHL	28	15	12	0	1,581	61	2	2.31	.911	—	—	—	—	—	—	—	—
2016–17	Linköpings HC	SHL	33	19	14	0	2,000	63	4	1.89	.931	6	2	4	340	14	0	2.47	.915
2016–17	Binghamton Senators	AHL	3	0	3	0	180	13	0	4.34	.865	—	—	—	—	—	—	—	—
2017–18	Belleville Senators	AHL	18	6	12	0	955	52	1	3.27	.899	—	—	—	—	—	—	—	—
2017–18	Brampton Beast	ECHL	16	8	7	1	949	49	0	3.10	.915	—	—	—	—	—	—	—	—
2018–19	Brampton Beast	ECHL	1	0	0	1	64	2	0	1.89	.935	—	—	—	—	—	—	—	—
2018–19	Belleville Senators	AHL	39	21	11	6	2,304	89	2	2.32	.917	—	—	—	—	—	—	—	—
2018–19	Ottawa Senators	NHL	4	0	2	1	206	14	0	4.09	.884	—	—	—	—	—	—	—	—
2019–20	Belleville Senators	AHL	15	7	6	0	821	42	0	3.05	.897	—	—	—	—	—	—	—	—
2019–20	Ottawa Senators	NHL	24	5	8	8	1,345	70	0	3.12	.904	—	—	—	—	—	—	—	—
2020–21	Ottawa Senators	NHL	14	4	7	0	642	40	0	3.74	.876	—	—	—	—	—	—	—	—
2020–21	Belleville Senators	AHL	2	2	0	0	120	3	0	1.51	.950	—	—	—	—	—	—	—	—
2021–22	Linköping HC	SHL	41	20	20	0	2,426	97	4	2.40	.910	—	—	—	—	—	—	—	—
2022–23	Linköping HC	SHL	43	18	25	0	2,475	121	3	2.93	.904	—	—	—	—	—	—	—	—
2023–24	Linköping HC	SHL	40	21	18	0	2,364	99	4	2.51	.914	—	—	—	—	—	—	—	—
2024–25	Bridgeport Islanders	AHL	11	2	5	3	625	34	0	3.26	.898	—	—	—	—	—	—	—	—
2024–25	New York Islanders	NHL	15	2	6	3	728	41	0	3.38	.878	—	—	—	—	—	—	—	—
2025–26	Bridgeport Islanders	AHL	31	12	13	6	1,831	89	1	2.92	.898	2	0	2	117	5	0	2.55	.886
2025–26	New York Islanders	NHL	1	0	0	0	13	2	0	8.90	.714	—	—	—	—	—	—	—	—
NHL totals			58	11	23	12	2,933	167	0	3.42	.890	—	—	—	—	—	—	—	—

=== International ===
Year	Team	Event	Result	GP	W	L	OT	MIN	GA	SO	GAA	SV%
2011	Sweden	IH18	2nd place, silver medalist(s)	4	3	1	0	—	—	—	3.00	.864
2012	Sweden	U18	2nd place, silver medalist(s)	2	1	0	0	87	5	0	3.44	.889
2014	Sweden	WJC	2nd place, silver medalist(s)	1	1	0	0	60	0	1	0.00	1.000
2022	Sweden	WC	6th	1	1	0	0	60	1	0	1.00	.950
Junior totals				7	5	1	0	147	5	1	—	—
Senior totals				1	1	0	0	60	1	0	1.00	.950
