= Michael Špaček (ice hockey) =

Czech ice hockey player (born 1997)

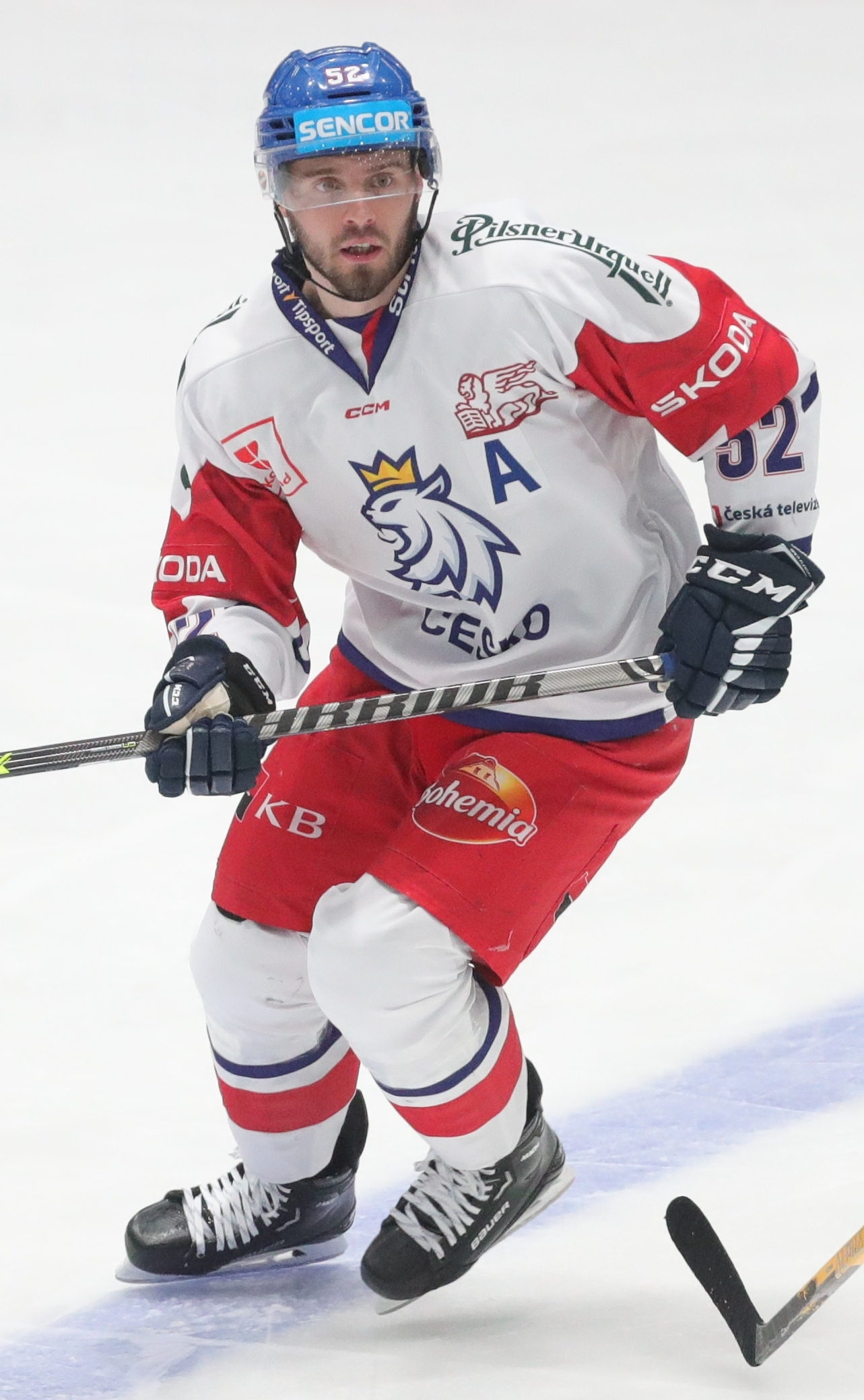
- Špaček with the Czech Republic (2023)
- Born: 9 April 1997 (age 29) Mariánské Lázně, Czech Republic
- Height: 5 ft 11 in (180 cm)
- Weight: 187 lb (85 kg; 13 st 5 lb)
- Position: Right wing
- Shoots: Right
- ELH team Former teams: Sparta Praha; HC Pardubice; Tappara; HC Oceláři Třinec; Frölunda HC; HC Ambrì-Piotta; Genève-Servette HC
- National team: Czech Republic
- NHL draft: 108th overall, 2015; Winnipeg Jets
- Playing career: 2014–present

Michael Špaček (born 9 April 1997) is a Czech professional ice hockey forward. He currently plays with Sparta Praha in the Czech Extraliga (ELH). Špaček was born in Mariánské Lázně, Czech Republic, but grew up in Dašice.

== Playing career ==
Špaček made his Czech Extraliga debut playing with HC Pardubice at age 17, during the 2013–14 season. Špaček had played as a youth within the Pardubice organization since 2010. In his first full professional campaign with Pardubice in 2014–15, Špaček contributed 12 points in 40 games. Spacek was selected in the 4th round, 108th overall by the Winnipeg Jets in the 2015 NHL entry draft. Špaček competed for the Red Deer Rebels of the WHL, during the 2015–16 season.

On 2 June 2017, after two seasons with Red Deer, Špaček completed his junior career by agreeing to a three-year, entry-level contract with the Winnipeg Jets.

During the 2019–20 season, reassigned to the Manitoba Moose of the AHL, Špaček appeared in 45 games posting 20 points assists before he was reassigned by the Jets to join the Ontario Reign, primary affiliate of the Los Angeles Kings, on loan for the remainder of the season on 2 March 2020. Špaček failed to appear in a game with the Reign due to injury before the season was prematurely ended due to the COVID-19 pandemic.

As an impending restricted free agent from the Jets, Špaček opted to halt his NHL aspirations by agreeing to a one-year contract in Finland with Tappara of the Liiga on 4 August 2020. His rights were later relinquished by the Jets on 4 October 2020. In the 2020–21 season, Špaček registered 5 goals and 13 points through 18 regular season games with Tappara before leaving the club to return to the Czech Republic in joining HC Oceláři Třinec of the ELH for the remainder of the season on 26 January 2021. Špaček made an immediate impact with Třinec, collecting 14 points in 16 playoff games to help the club claim the Championship.

As a free agent, Špaček joined his third European club within the year, agreeing to a two-year contract with Swedish outfit Frölunda HC of the SHL on 3 May 2021.

== Career statistics ==
=== Regular season and playoffs ===
			Regular season					Playoffs
Season	Team	League	GP	G	A	Pts	PIM	GP	G	A	Pts	PIM
2012–13	HC ČSOB Pojišťovna Pardubice	CZE U18	39	28	22	50	69	2	0	0	0	2
2013–14	HC ČSOB Pojišťovna Pardubice	CZE U18	6	4	5	9	8	—	—	—	—	—
2013–14	HC ČSOB Pojišťovna Pardubice	CZE U20	31	15	13	28	56	—	—	—	—	—
2013–14	HC ČSOB Pojišťovna Pardubice	ELH	4	0	0	0	0	—	—	—	—	—
2014–15	HC ČSOB Pojišťovna Pardubice	ELH	40	5	7	12	12	4	0	0	0	0
2014–15	HC ČSOB Pojišťovna Pardubice	CZE U20	5	2	5	7	38	—	—	—	—	—
2014–15	HC ČSOB Pojišťovna Pardubice	CZE U18	—	—	—	—	—	4	3	3	6	12
2015–16	Red Deer Rebels	WHL	61	18	36	54	18	17	3	10	13	2
2016–17	Red Deer Rebels	WHL	59	30	55	85	34	7	4	8	12	6
2016–17	Manitoba Moose	AHL	4	0	1	1	8	—	—	—	—	—
2017–18	Manitoba Moose	AHL	70	17	21	38	24	6	1	2	3	20
2018–19	Manitoba Moose	AHL	74	10	31	41	32	—	—	—	—	—
2019–20	Manitoba Moose	AHL	45	9	11	20	2	—	—	—	—	—
2020–21	Tappara	Liiga	18	5	8	13	4	—	—	—	—	—
2020–21	HC Oceláři Třinec	ELH	9	2	9	11	2	16	2	12	14	8
2021–22	Frölunda HC	SHL	49	10	36	46	33	8	1	3	4	2
2022–23	HC Ambrì-Piotta	NL	50	14	36	50	8	—	—	—	—	—
2023–24	HC Ambrì-Piotta	NL	48	17	33	50	10	4	0	0	0	0
2024–25	Genève-Servette HC	NL	21	1	12	13	4	—	—	—	—	—
2024–25	HC Sparta Praha	ELH	27	15	17	32	10	12	2	5	7	31
2025–26	HC Sparta Praha	ELH	52	15	28	43	18	16	4	9	13	8
ELH totals			132	37	61	98	42	48	8	26	34	47
NL totals			119	32	81	113	22	4	0	0	0	0

=== International ===
Medal record

Ice hockey

Representing Czech Republic

World Championships
Bronze medal – third place	2022 Finland	

IIHF World U18 Championship
Silver medal – second place	2014 Finland	

Year	Team	Event	Result	GP	G	A	Pts	PIM
2014	Czech Republic	WJC18	2nd place, silver medalist(s)	7	2	5	7	2
2015	Czech Republic	WJC	6th	5	0	1	1	2
2015	Czech Republic	WJC18	6th	5	1	4	5	0
2016	Czech Republic	WJC	5th	5	2	3	5	0
2017	Czech Republic	WJC	6th	5	1	2	3	2
2021	Czech Republic	WC	7th	7	1	4	5	4
2022	Czechia	OG	9th	2	1	0	1	0
2022	Czechia	WC	3rd place, bronze medalist(s)	10	1	0	1	0
2023	Czechia	WC	8th	8	0	2	2	2
2025	Czechia	WC	6th	8	1	3	4	0
Junior totals				27	6	15	21	6
Senior totals				35	4	9	13	6
