= Filip Chlapík =

Czech ice hockey player (born 1997)

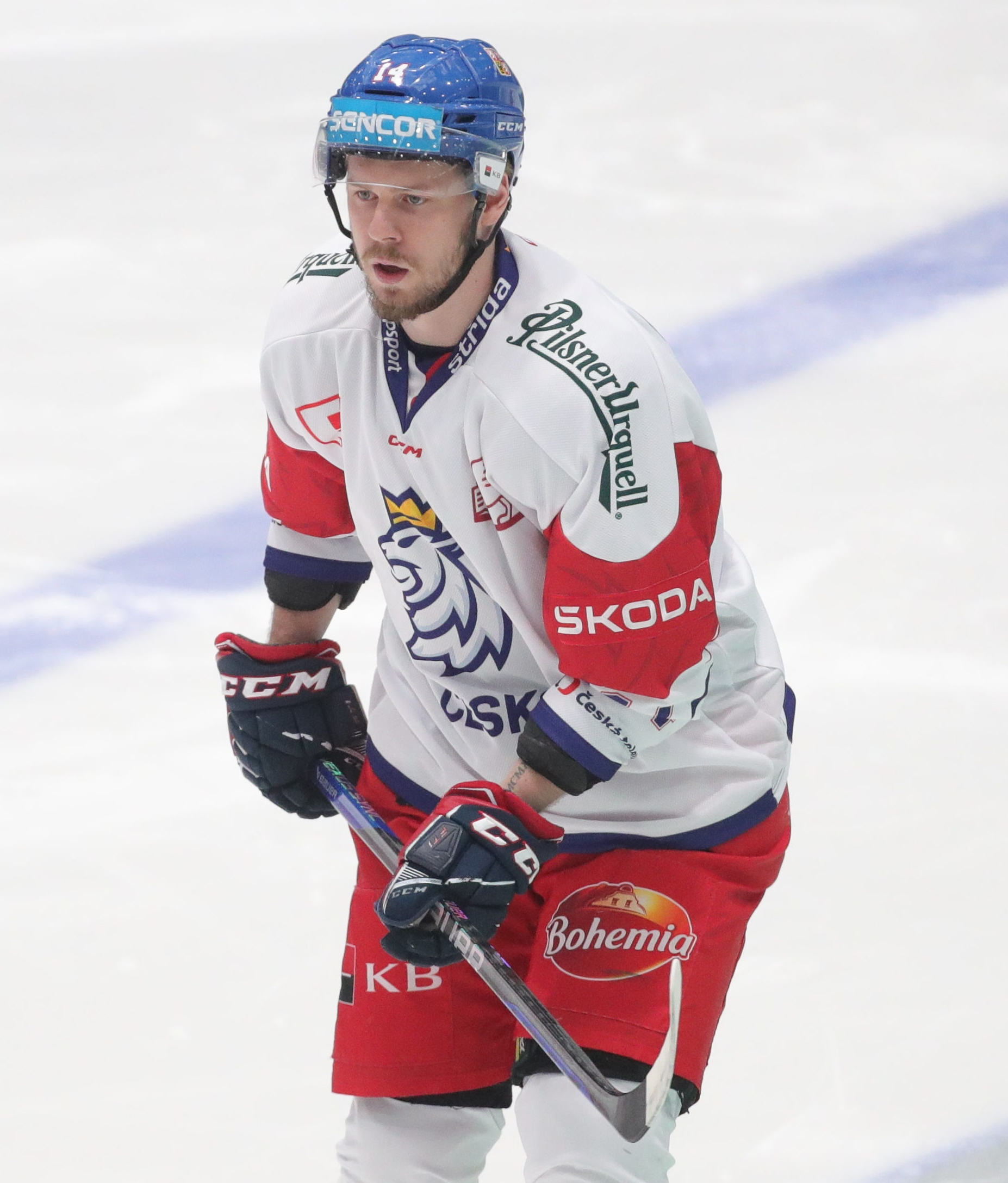
- Chlapík with the Czech Republic (2023)
- Born: 3 June 1997 (age 29) Prague, Czech Republic
- Height: 6 ft 1 in (185 cm)
- Weight: 194 lb (88 kg; 13 st 12 lb)
- Position: Centre
- Shoots: Left
- ELH team Former teams: HC Sparta Praha; Ottawa Senators; Lahti Pelicans; HC Ambrì-Piotta
- National team: Czech Republic
- NHL draft: 48th overall, 2015; Ottawa Senators
- Playing career: 2014–present

Filip Chlapík (born 3 June 1997) is a Czech professional ice hockey player who is a forward for HC Sparta Praha of the Czech Extraliga (ELH). Chlapík was selected 48th overall by the Ottawa Senators in the 2015 NHL entry draft. Chlapík played 57 games with the Senators in the National Hockey League (NHL) before moving in 2021 to play in Europe.

== Playing career ==
Chlapík was drafted by the Charlottetown Islanders in the first round (11th overall) of the 2014 CHL Import Draft. In his first season with Charlottetown he was recognized for his outstanding play when he was selected to take part in the 2015 CHL/NHL Top Prospects Game. He was also named to the 2014–15 QMJHL All-Rookie Team after tying for league lead in both rookie goal scoring (33) and power-play goals (10).

Chlapík signed an entry-level contract with the Ottawa Senators on 22 December 2016. Chlapík made his professional debut with the Belleville Senators, the American Hockey League (AHL) affiliate of the Ottawa Senators in October 2017. Chlapík was an injury call-up to Ottawa later in October and made his NHL debut on 26 October 2017 in a 5–4 win against the Philadelphia Flyers, during which he scored his first NHL point.

Chlapík started the 2017–18 season with the Belleville Senators. He was called up to the NHL on 25 October 2017 and played one game before being sent back to the AHL on 28 October 2017. He was called up multiple times in December and January but was injured in a game against the Minnesota Wild and was sent down to the AHL shortly after. Chlapík was not called up again until 19 March 2018, and he recorded his first NHL goal on 22 March 2018, in a game against the Edmonton Oilers.

Entering his fourth season within the Senators organization and with the 2020–21 season set to be delayed due to the ongoing COVID-19 pandemic, Chlapík was loaned by Ottawa to remain with his original hometown club, HC Sparta Praha, on 29 September 2020. He made three appearances in the Czech Extraliga, registering one goal before returning to the Ottawa Senators for the commencement of training camp. Remaining with the Senators roster, primarily assigned to the club's taxi squad, Chlapík featured in one game, going scoreless, before he was reassigned to Belleville. After two games in the AHL, on 27 February 2021, Chlapík was placed on unconditional waivers and was subsequently mutually released from the remainder of his contract with the Ottawa Senators.

As a free agent, Chlapík secured a contract for the remainder of the 2020–21 season with Finnish club, Lahti Pelicans of the Liiga, on 2 March 2021. He collected two goals and six points through 11 regular season games before making five playoff appearances.

On 11 May 2021, Chlapík returned to his original Czech club, HC Sparta Praha, agreeing to a two-year contract.

== International play ==
Chlapík won silver medals with the Czech under-18 national team at both the 2014 IIHF World U18 Championships and 2014 Ivan Hlinka Memorial Tournament. He also competed at the 2015 IIHF World U18 Championships where the Czech national team was eliminated in the Quarterfinals. On 7 February 2026, it was announced that Chlapík will represent the Czech Republic for the 2026 Winter Olympics replacing an injured Pavel Zacha.

== Personal life ==
Chlapík is good friends with Daniel Sprong. Sprong was chosen just two picks ahead of Chlapík by the Pittsburgh Penguins.

His brother Adam Chlapík is also a hockey player.

== Career statistics ==
=== Regular season and playoffs ===
			Regular season					Playoffs
Season	Team	League	GP	G	A	Pts	PIM	GP	G	A	Pts	PIM
2013–14	HC Sparta Praha	Czech20	38	16	19	35	22	7	3	3	6	6
2013–14	HC Litomerice	Czech.1	1	0	0	0	0	—	—	—	—	—
2014–15	Charlottetown Islanders	QMJHL	64	33	42	75	42	9	1	8	9	10
2015–16	Charlottetown Islanders	QMJHL	52	12	42	54	50	5	1	1	2	0
2016–17	Charlottetown Islanders	QMJHL	57	34	57	91	98	13	5	14	19	27
2017–18	Belleville Senators	AHL	52	11	21	32	47	—	—	—	—	—
2017–18	Ottawa Senators	NHL	20	1	3	4	4	—	—	—	—	—
2018–19	Belleville Senators	AHL	57	16	18	34	28	—	—	—	—	—
2018–19	Ottawa Senators	NHL	5	1	0	1	4	—	—	—	—	—
2019–20	Belleville Senators	AHL	37	10	12	22	49	—	—	—	—	—
2019–20	Ottawa Senators	NHL	31	3	3	6	10	—	—	—	—	—
2020–21	HC Sparta Praha	ELH	3	1	0	1	8	—	—	—	—	—
2020–21	Ottawa Senators	NHL	1	0	0	0	0	—	—	—	—	—
2020–21	Belleville Senators	AHL	2	0	0	0	6	—	—	—	—	—
2020–21	Lahti Pelicans	Liiga	11	2	4	6	4	5	2	1	3	16
2021–22	HC Sparta Praha	ELH	53	31	39	70	39	16	5	10	15	12
2022–23	HC Ambrì-Piotta	NL	50	24	13	37	38	—	—	—	—	—
2023–24	HC Sparta Praha	ELH	47	22	26	48	32	11	3	7	10	7
2024–25	HC Sparta Praha	ELH	49	15	33	48	36	12	4	7	11	10
2025–26	HC Sparta Praha	ELH	48	21	30	51	32	19	6	8	14	12
NHL totals			57	5	6	11	18	—	—	—	—	—
ELH totals			200	90	128	218	147	58	18	32	50	41

=== International ===
Year	Team	Event	Result	GP	G	A	Pts	PIM
2014	Czech Republic	U17	7th	5	1	1	2	2
2014	Czech Republic	IH18	2nd place, silver medalist(s)	5	1	4	5	2
2014	Czech Republic	WJC18	2nd place, silver medalist(s)	7	0	1	1	2
2015	Czech Republic	WJC18	6th	3	0	0	0	2
2016	Czech Republic	WJC	5th	5	0	0	0	2
2017	Czech Republic	WJC	6th	5	2	1	3	0
2023	Czechia	WC	8th	4	0	0	0	2
2026	Czechia	OG	8th	4	2	1	3	0
Junior totals				30	4	7	11	10
Senior totals				8	2	1	3	2

== Awards and honours ==
Honours	Year
IIHF World U18 Championship Silver Medal	2014
Ivan Hlinka Memorial Tournament Silver Medal	2014
QMJHL All-Rookie Team	2014–15
CHL/NHL Top Prospects Game	2015
Spengler Cup (Ambri-Piotta)	2022
