= Hynek Zohorna =

Czech ice hockey player

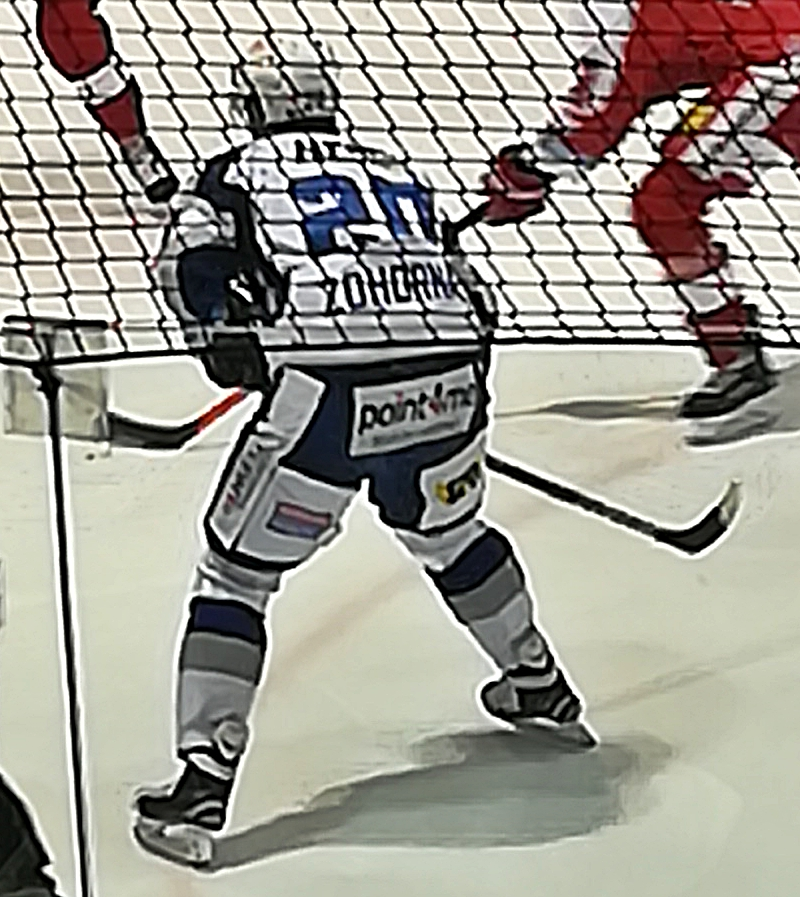
- Zohorna in 2017
- Born: 1 August 1990 (age 35); Havlíčkův Brod, Czechoslovakia
- Height: 6 ft 2 in (188 cm)
- Weight: 207 lb (94 kg; 14 st 11 lb)
- Position: Forward
- Shoots: Right
- ELH team Former teams: HC Kometa Brno; HC Dynamo Pardubice; Lahti Pelicans; Amur Khabarovsk; IK Oskarshamn
- National team: Czech Republic
- Playing career: 2008–present

Hynek Zohorna (born 1 August 1990) is a Czech professional ice hockey player for HC Kometa Brno in the Czech Extraliga (ELH).

Zohorna made his Czech Extraliga debut playing with Kometa Brno debut during the 2011–12 Czech Extraliga season.

== Career statistics ==
=== Regular season and playoffs ===
			Regular season					Playoffs
Season	Team	League	GP	G	A	Pts	PIM	GP	G	A	Pts	PIM
2006–07	HC VČE Hradec Králové	CZE U18	39	11	14	25	55	—	—	—	—	—
2007–08	HC VCES Hradec Králové	CZE U20	7	0	0	0	4	—	—	—	—	—
2008–09	HC Slavia Praha	CZE U20	4	1	2	3	4	2	0	0	0	0
2008–09	HC Rebel Havlíčkův Brod	CZE.2	14	0	1	1	0	—	—	—	—	—
2008–09	HC Spartak Pelhřimov	CZE.3	3	0	0	0	2	—	—	—	—	—
2009–10	HC Slavia Praha	CZE U20	50	12	27	39	40	9	6	2	8	16
2009–10	HC Rebel Havlíčkův Brod	CZE.2	1	0	0	0	0	2	0	1	1	0
2010–11	HC Rebel Havlíčkův Brod	CZE U20	9	6	6	12	14	—	—	—	—	—
2010–11	HC Rebel Havlíčkův Brod	CZE.2	40	11	8	19	22	14	5	2	7	10
2011–12	HC Kometa Brno	ELH	51	5	9	14	24	20	2	3	5	8
2011–12	HC Rebel Havlíčkův Brod	CZE.2	9	2	4	6	0	—	—	—	—	—
2012–13	HC Kometa Brno	ELH	52	14	15	29	24	—	—	—	—	—
2013–14	HC Kometa Brno	ELH	48	6	7	13	38	17	5	4	9	4
2013–14	SK Horácká Slavia Třebíč	CZE.2	3	1	1	2	0	—	—	—	—	—
2013–14	HC Rebel Havlíčkův Brod	CZE.2	2	1	1	2	2	—	—	—	—	—
2014–15	HC Kometa Brno	ELH	19	3	8	11	12	10	2	2	4	4
2014–15	HC Rebel Havlíčkův Brod	CZE.2	7	2	1	3	4	—	—	—	—	—
2015–16	HC Kometa Brno	ELH	49	4	9	13	18	4	1	2	3	2
2016–17	HC Kometa Brno	ELH	39	9	5	14	18	14	2	6	8	4
2016–17	HC Dynamo Pardubice	ELH	7	0	0	0	0	—	—	—	—	—
2017–18	HC Kometa Brno	ELH	51	9	13	22	18	14	8	7	15	4
2018–19	Pelicans	Liiga	48	14	25	39	14	6	2	0	2	2
2019–20	Amur Khabarovsk	KHL	62	11	22	33	18	—	—	—	—	—
2020–21	Amur Khabarovsk	KHL	47	11	15	26	30	—	—	—	—	—
2021–22	IK Oskarshamn	SHL	48	10	19	29	16	10	1	2	3	11
2022–23	IK Oskarshamn	SHL	45	7	19	26	24	3	0	0	0	4
2023–24	IK Oskarshamn	SHL	48	8	5	13	16	—	—	—	—	—
2024–25	HC Kometa Brno	ELH	50	11	14	25	20	19	4	8	12	6
ELH totals			366	61	80	141	172	98	24	32	56	32

Medal record

Representing Czech Republic

Ice hockey

World Championships
Bronze medal – third place	2022 Finland	

=== International ===
Year	Team	Event	Result	GP	G	A	Pts	PIM
2019	Czech Republic	WC	4th	8	0	0	0	0
2022	Czech Republic	OG	9th	4	0	2	2	0
2022	Czech Republic	WC	3rd place, bronze medalist(s)	10	1	3	4	4
Senior totals				22	1	5	6	4
