= 2024 Swiss Ice Hockey Games =

2024 Swiss Ice Hockey Games (Euro Hockey Games)
Tournament details
- Host countries: Switzerland; Czechia
- Cities: Fribourg; Pardubice
- Venues: 2 (in 2 host cities)
- Dates: 12–15 December 2024
- Teams: 4

Final positions
- Champions: Czech Republic (1st title)
- Runners-up: Finland
- Third place: Sweden
- Fourth place: Switzerland

Tournament statistics
- Games played: 6
- Goals scored: 34 (5.67 per game)
- Attendance: 31,813 (5,302 per game)
- Scoring leader(s): (Czech Republic) Filip Zadina (Sweden) Lucas Wallmark (4 points)

The 2024 Swiss Ice Hockey Games was played between 12 and 15 December 2024. The Czech Republic, Finland, Sweden and Switzerland played a round-robin for a total of three games per team and six games in total. Five of the games were played in Zürich, Switzerland and one game in Pardubice, Czech Republic. The tournament was won by Sweden. The tournament was part of the 2024–25 Euro Hockey Tour.

== Standings ==
Pos	Team	Pld	W	OTW	OTL	L	GF	GA	GD	Pts
1	Czech Republic	3	3	0	0	0	10	4	+6	9
2	Finland	3	1	0	0	2	4	4	0	3
3	Sweden	3	1	0	0	2	7	9	−2	3
4	Switzerland	3	1	0	0	2	2	6	−4	3

Source: eurohockey

== Games ==
All times are local. Fribourg – (Central European Time – UTC+1) Pardubice – (Central European Time – UTC+1)

12 December 2024; 17:45	Czech Republic	3-1 (1-0, 1-1, 1-0)	Finland	Enteria arena, Pardubice; Attendance: 10,194

Game reference

Josef Kořenář
Goalies
Emil Larmi
Referees:
(Sweden) Tobias Björk
(Sweden) Alexander Österberg

16:10 – Dominik Kubalík (Jiří Smejkal, Libor Zábranský)	1-0
	1-1	22:55 – Harri Pesonen (Jerry Turkulainen, Patrik Puistola) (PP)
25:44 – Dominik Kubalík (Jiří Smejkal, Jakub Sirota)	2-1
58:49 – Matěj Stránský (Ondřej Beránek)) (EN)	3-1

4 min
Penalties
6 min
24
Shots
15

12 December 2024; 19:45	Sweden	4-1 (0-0, 4-0, 0-1)	Switzerland	BCF Arena, Fribourg; Attendance: 4,467

Game reference

Lars Johansson
Goalies
Stéphane Charlin
Referees:
(Finland) Mikko Kaukokari
(Czech Republic) Janne Wuorenheimo

26:30 – Jacob de la Rose (Lucas Wallmark, Linus Sandin) (PP)	1-0
31:53 – Lucas Wallmark (Linus Sandin, Jesper Frödén) (PP)	2-0
32:10 – Sebastian Hartmann (Milton Oscarsson, Max Lindholm)	3-0
37:23 – Mathias Bromé (Fredrik Olofsson) (SHG)	4-0
	4-1	55:09 – Dario Simion (Ken Jäger)

10 min
Penalties
37 min
24
Shots
36

14 December 2024; 14:00	Finland	3-0 (1-0, 2-0, 0-0)	Sweden	BCF Arena, Fribourg; Attendance: 3,011

Game reference

Christian Heljanko
Goalies
Arvid Holm
Referees:
(Switzerland) Micha Hebeisen
(Switzerland) Philip Ströbel

12:56 – Kalle Kossila (Patrik Puistola, Waltteri Merelä)	1-0
25:40 – Markus Nurmi (Antti Suomela, Lauri Pajuniemi) (PP)	2-0
36:18 – Santtu Kinnunen (Lauri Pajuniemi, Antti Suomela) (PP)	3-0

8 min
Penalties
8 min
30
Shots
23

14 December 2024; 18:00	Switzerland	0-2 (0-2, 0-0, 0-0)	Czech Republic	BCF Arena, Fribourg; Attendance: 6,412

Game reference
Ludovic Waeber	Goalies	Šimon Zajíček	Referees: (Finland) Mikko Kaukokari (Finland) Janne Wuorenheimo
0-1 / 11:07 – Filip Zadina (Tomáš Kundrátek, Jakub Krejcik); 0-2 / 19:39 – Matěj Stránský (David Tomášek, Libor Zábranský)			Referees: (Finland) Mikko Kaukokari (Finland) Janne Wuorenheimo
6 min	Penalties	6 min	Referees: (Finland) Mikko Kaukokari (Finland) Janne Wuorenheimo
25	Shots	27	Referees: (Finland) Mikko Kaukokari (Finland) Janne Wuorenheimo

15 December 2024; 11:30	Czech Republic	5-3 (1-0, 1-2, 3-1)	Sweden	BCF Arena, Fribourg; Attendance: 2,176

Game reference

Josef Kořenář
Goalies
Lars Johansson
Referees:
(Slovakia) Miroslav Stolc
(Switzerland) Michael Tscherrig

08:51 – Filip Chlapík (Filip Zadina, Lukáš Sedlák)	1-0
	1-1	22:50 – Andreas Wingerli (Sebastian Hartmann, Max Lindholm)
	1-2	24:00 – Mathias Bromé (Marcus Sörensen, Lucas Wallmark)
29:32 – Filip Zadina (Lukáš Sedlák, Jakub Sirota)	2-2
43:02 – Jáchym Kondelík (Jakub Flek, Ondřej Beránek)	3-2
50:03 – Ondřej Kovařčík (Daniel Voženílek, Michal Kovařčík) (PP)	4-2
	4-3	53:19 – Jacob de la Rose (Marcus Sörensen, Tim Heed)
59:51 – Martin Kaut (SHG/EN)	5-3

10 min
Penalties
8 min
33
Shots
39

15 December 2024; 15:30	Switzerland	1-0 (1-0, 0-0, 0-0)	Finland	BCF Arena, Fribourg; Attendance: 5,553

Game reference
Ludovic Waeber	Goalies	Emil Larmi	Referees: (Czech Republic) Roman Šír (Czech Republic) Lukáš Květoň
14:07 – Christoph Bertschy (Fabian Heldner, Dario Simion) / 1-0			Referees: (Czech Republic) Roman Šír (Czech Republic) Lukáš Květoň
6 min	Penalties	2 min	Referees: (Czech Republic) Roman Šír (Czech Republic) Lukáš Květoň
31	Shots	24	Referees: (Czech Republic) Roman Šír (Czech Republic) Lukáš Květoň

== Scoring leaders ==
Pos	Player	Country	GP	G	A	Pts	+/−	PIM	POS
1	Filip Zadina	Czech Republic	3	2	1	3	+3	0	F
2	Lucas Wallmark	Sweden	3	1	2	3	-3	2	F
3	Matěj Stránský	Czech Republic	3	2	0	2	+2	0	F
4	Dominik Kubalík	Czech Republic	3	2	0	2	+3	0	F
5	Jacob de la Rose	Sweden	3	2	0	2	-2	4	F

GP = Games played; G = Goals; A = Assists; Pts = Points; +/− = Plus/minus; PIM = Penalties in minutes; POS = Position
Source: quanthockey

== Goaltending leaders ==
Pos	Player	Country	TOI	GA	GAA	Sv%	SO
1	Ludovic Waeber	Switzerland	117:18	2	1.02	96.15	0
2	Emil Larmi	Finland	117:13	3	1.54	95.15	0
3	Josef Kořenář	Czech Republic	120:00	4	2.00	93.22	0
4	Lars Johansson	Sweden	117:07	5	2.56	82.31	0

TOI = Time on ice (minutes:seconds); SA = Shots against; GA = Goals against; GAA = Goals Against Average; Sv% = Save percentage; SO = Shutouts
Source: Swiss Ice Hockey
