= 2024 Karjala Tournament =

2024 Karjala Tournament (Euro Hockey Games)
Tournament details
- Host countries: Finland; Czechia
- Cities: Helsinki; Karlovy Vary
- Venues: 2 (in 2 host cities)
- Dates: 7–10 November 2024
- Teams: 4

Final positions
- Champions: Finland (13th title)
- Runners-up: Switzerland
- Third place: Czech Republic
- Fourth place: Sweden

Tournament statistics
- Games played: 6
- Goals scored: 39 (6.5 per game)
- Attendance: 28,134 (4,689 per game)
- Scoring leader: (Finland) Harri Pesonen (7 points)

The 2024 Karjala Tournament was played between 7 and 10 November 2024. The Czech Republic, Finland, Sweden and Switzerland played a round-robin for a total of three games per team and six games in total. One game was played in KV Arena, Karlovy Vary, Czech Republic (Sweden vs Czech Republic) all the other games were played in Helsinki Ice Hall, Helsinki. Finland won the tournament. The tournament was part of 2024–25 Euro Hockey Tour.

== Standings ==
Pos	Team	Pld	W	OTW	OTL	L	GF	GA	GD	Pts
1	Finland	3	2	1	0	0	12	6	+6	8
2	Czech Republic	3	2	0	0	1	10	8	+2	6
3	Switzerland	3	0	1	1	1	8	11	−3	3
4	Sweden	3	0	0	1	2	9	14	−5	1

Source: eurohockey

== Games ==
All times are local. Helsinki – (Eastern European Time – UTC+2) Karlovy Vary – (Central European Time – UTC+1)

7 November 2024; 17:00	Czech Republic	5-2 (3-0, 1-1, 1-1)	Sweden	KV Arena, Karlovy Vary; Attendance: 5,738

Game reference

Ondřej Kacetl
Goalies
Erik Källgren
Referees:
(Switzerland) Cedric Borga
(Switzerland) Micha Hebeisen
Linesmen:
(Czech Republic) Petr Šimánek
(Czech Republic) Josef Špůr

07:02 – Daniel Gazda	1-0
10:02 – Filip Pyrochta (Michal Kovařčík)	2-0
16:55 – Pavel Kousal (Martin Kaut, Radan Lenc) (PP)	3-0
	3-1	23:00 – Dennis Rasmussen
37:26 – Daniel Gazda (Filip Pyrochta)	4-1
	4-2	37:10 – Oskar Lang (Anton Bengtsson)
59:17 – Jakub Flek (Matyáš Kantner) (EN)	5-2

4 min
Penalties
4 min
20
Shots
29

7 November 2024; 18:30	Switzerland	2-3 OT (0-0, 2-0, 0-2, 0-1) (OT: 0–1)	Finland	Helsinki Ice Hall, Helsinki; Attendance: 4,554

Game reference

Stéphane Charlin
Goalies
Harri Säteri
Referees:
(Sweden) Daniel Eriksson
(Sweden) Richard Magnusson

27:51 – Giancarlo Chanton (Denis Malgin, Damien Riat)	1-0
37:16 – Fabrice Herzog (Sven Senteler, Dario Simion)	2-0
	2-1	45:37 – Mikko Lehtonen (Patrik Puistola, Ahti Oksanen)
	2-2	54:03 – Harri Pesonen (Mikael Ruohomaa, Toni Rajala)
	2-3	61:11 – Robin Salo (Mikael Ruohomaa, Arttu Ruotsalainen) (OT)

8 min
Penalties
4 min
29
Shots
26

9 November 2024; 13:30	Sweden	3-4 GWS (1-1, 1-1, 1-1) (OT: 0–0) (SO: 0–1)	Switzerland	Helsinki Ice Hall, Helsinki; Attendance: 1,225

Game reference

Jacob Johansson
Goalies
Gilles Senn
Referees:
(Finland) Joonas Kova
(Finland) Janne Wuorenheimo

	0-1	12:32 – Sven Andrighetto (Denis Malgin, Damien Riat)
19:27 – Anton Bengtsson (Victor Söderström, Oskar Lang)	1-1
26:38 – Oskar Lang (Christoffer Ehn, Christian Folin)	2-1
	2-2	38:53 – Dario Simion (Fabrice Herzog)
	2-3	41:17 – Sven Andrighetto (Dean Kukan, Denis Malgin) (PP)
45:15 – Emil Pettersson (Andreas Johnsson, Henrik Tömmernes)	3-3

Shootout
Riat
6 min
Penalties
6 min
29
Shots
29

9 November 2024; 17:00	Finland	4-0 (2-0, 1-0, 1-0)	Czech Republic	Helsinki Ice Hall, Helsinki; Attendance: 7,114

Game reference

Emil Larmi
Goalies
Jakub Malek
Referees:
(Sweden) Daniel Eriksson
(Sweden) Richard Magnusson

04:52 – Harri Pesonen	1-0
19:36 – Toni Rajala	2-0
27:32 – Harri Pesonen (Toni Rajala, Mikko Lehtonen)	3-0
45:29 – Arttu Ruotsalainen (Miro Aaltonen)	4-0

12 min
Penalties
35 min
24
Shots
34

10 November 2024; 13:30	Czech Republic	5-2 (3-1, 2-1, 0-0)	Switzerland	Helsinki Ice Hall, Helsinki; Attendance: 1,303

Game reference

Ondřej Kacetl
Goalies
~~Stéphane Charlin~~ Gilles Senn
Referees:
(Finland) Riku Brander
(Finland) Kristian Vikman

03:08 – Jachym Kondelik (Ondřej Beránek)	1-0
	1-1	12:56 – Giancarlo Chanton (David Aebischer, Mike Künzle)
17:41 – Radan Lenc (Filip Pyrochta, Ondřej Beránek)	2-1
19:05 – Radim Zohorna (Ronald Knot, Jan Ščotka)	3-1
	3-2	33:11 – Andres Ambühl (Mike Künzle, Nicolas Baechler)
36:36 – Michal Kunc (Martin Kaut, Jachym Kondelik) (PP)	4-2
38:43 – Martin Kaut (Michael Spacek, Daniel Gazda)	5-2

2 min
Penalties
2 min
28
Shots
20

10 November 2024; 17:00	Finland	5-4 (0-2, 3-1, 2-1)	Sweden	Helsinki Ice Hall, Helsinki; Attendance: 8,200

Game reference

Harri Säteri
Goalies
Jacob Johansson
Referees:
(Czech Republic) Adam Kika
(Czech Republic) Jakub Sinde

	0-1	03:14 – Jesper Sellgren (Max Friberg, Oskar Lang)
	0-2	15:15 – Oskar Steen (Jacob Peterson)
24:24 – Mikael Ruohomaa (Harri Pesonen)	1-2
29:58 – Harri Pesonen (Santtu Kinnunen, Atro Leppänen)	2-2
36:00 – Sampo Ranta (Santtu Kinnunen, Otto Koivula)	3-2
	3-3	37:26 – Dennis Rasmussen (Emil Pettersson, Victor Söderström) (PP)
49:52 – Harri Pesonen (Toni Rajala, Robin Salo) (PP)	4-3
	4-4	50:58 – Patrik Karlkvist (Emil Pettersson, Victor Söderström) (PP)
54:35 – Mikael Ruohomaa (Toni Rajala)	5-4

6 min
Penalties
8 min
28
Shots
17

== Scoring leaders ==
Pos	Player	Country	GP	G	A	Pts	+/−	PIM	POS
1	Harri Pesonen	Finland	3	5	2	7	+5	2	F
2	Toni Rajala	Finland	3	1	4	5	+4	X	F
3	Mikael Ruohomaa	Finland	3	2	2	4	+6	X	F
4	Oskar Lang	Sweden	3	2	2	4	+4	X	F
5	Daniel Gazda	Czech Republic	3	2	1	3	+5	X	D

GP = Games played; G = Goals; A = Assists; Pts = Points; +/− = Plus/minus; PIM = Penalties in minutes; POS = Position
Source: quanthockey
