= 2025 Czech Hockey Games =

2025 Betano Hockey Games (Euro Hockey Games)
Tournament details
- Host countries: Czechia; Switzerland
- Cities: Brno; Kloten
- Venues: 2 (in 2 host cities)
- Dates: 1–4 May 2025
- Teams: 4

Final positions
- Champions: Sweden (5th title)
- Runners-up: Switzerland
- Third place: Czech Republic
- Fourth place: Finland

Tournament statistics
- Games played: 6
- Goals scored: 41 (6.83 per game)
- Attendance: 35,127 (5,855 per game)
- Scoring leader(s): (Switzerland) Simon Knak (Sweden) Leo Carlsson (5 points)

The 2025 Betano Hockey Games was played between 1 and 4 May 2025. The Czech Republic, Finland, Sweden and Switzerland played a round-robin for a total of three games per team and six games in total. Five of the games were played in Brno, Czech Republic and one game in Kloten, Switzerland. The tournament was won by Sweden. The tournament was part of the 2024–25 Euro Hockey Tour.

== Standings ==
Pos	Team	Pld	W	OTW	OTL	L	GF	GA	GD	Pts
1	Sweden	3	3	0	0	0	12	5	+7	9
2	Switzerland	3	2	0	0	1	14	7	+7	6
3	Czech Republic	3	1	0	0	2	9	11	−2	3
4	Finland	3	0	0	0	3	6	18	−12	0

Source: eurohockey.com

== Games ==
All times are local. Prague – (Central European Summer Time – UTC+2) Kloten – (Central European Summer Time – UTC+2)

1 May 2025; 18:00	Czech Republic	4-2 (3-0, 0-1, 1-1)	Finland	Winning Group Arena, Brno; Attendance: 6,923

Game reference

Karel Vejmelka
Goalies
Juuse Saros
Referees:
(Switzerland) Michael Tscherrig
(Switzerland) Phillip Ströbel

02:0" – Jakub Lauko (Michal Kovařčík)	1-0
12:31 – Ondřej Beránek (Jiří Černoch, Michael Spacek) (PP)	2-0
12:38 – Filip Chlapík	3-0
	3-1	31:01 – Lenni Hämeenaho (Jan-Mikael Järvinen, Eeli Tolvanen) (PP)
	3-2	43:42 – Veli-Matti Vittasmäki (Lassi Thomson, Jan-Mikael Järvinen)
59:58 – Jakub Lauko (Jakub Krejcik, Michael Spacek)	4-2

2 min
Penalties
8 min
34
Shots
21

1 May 2025; 19:45	Sweden	2-1 (0-1, 2-0, 0-0)	Switzerland	Swiss Arena, Kloten; Attendance: 6,576

Game reference

Samuel Ersson
Goalies
Leonardo Genoni
Referees:
(Finland) Mikko Kaukokari
(Finland) Riku Brander

	0-1	07:54 – Tyler Moy (Romain Loeffel) (PP)
34:13 – Mika Zibanejad (Alexander Wennberg, Leo Carlsson) (PP)	1-1
36:28 – William Eklund (Leo Carlsson, Mika Zibanejad) (PP)	2-1

2 min
Penalties
11 min
20
Shots
31

3 May 2025; 12:00	Switzerland	8-2 (3-2, 3-0, 2-0)	Finland	Winning Group Arena, Brno; Attendance: 4,753

Game reference

Sandro Aeschlimann
Goalies
Emil Larmi Justus Annunen
Referees:
(Czech Republic)
(Czech Republic)

	0-1	06:12 – Lassi Thomson (Valtteri Pulli, Jan-Mikael Järvinen)
08:02 – Andrea Glauser (Sandro Aeschlimann)	1-1
	1-2	15:49 – Juho Lammikko
15:57 – Grégory Hofmann	2-2
16:38 – Sven Jung (Christoph Bertschy)	3-2
29:10 – Sven Andrighetto (Dean Kukan, Denis Malgin) (PP)	4-2
29:23 – Grégory Hofmann (Christoph Bertschy)	5-2
33:25 – Grégory Hofmann (PP)	6-2
44:40 – Andrea Glauser	7-2
52:51 – Tyler Moy (Damien Riat)	8-2

4 min
Penalties
8 min
19
Shots
30

3 May 2025; 16:00	Czech Republic	2-4 (0-1, 2-2, 0-1)	Sweden	Winning Group Arena, Brno; Attendance: 6,911

Game reference

Daniel Vladař
Goalies
Arvid Söderblom
Referees:
(Czech Republic) Phillip Ströbel
(Czech Republic) Michael Tscherrig

	0-1	01:53 – Leo Carlsson (Mika Zibanejad, Lias Andersson) (PP)
28:33 – Jan Košťálek (Filip Pyrochta, David Špaček)	1-1
	1-2	29:14 – Mika Zibanejad (Rasmus Andersson, Leo Carlsson) (PP)
	1-3	34:39 – Rasmus Andersson (Leo Carlsson) (PP)
37:30 – Adam Klapka (Jakub Lauko)	2-3
	2-4	58:27 – Isac Lundeström (Simon Edvinsson)

14 min
Penalties
33 min
32
Shots
23

4 May 2025; 12:00	Sweden	6-2 (1-1, 3-0, 2-1)	Finland	Winning Group Arena, Brno; Attendance: 4,083

Game reference

Samuel Ersson
Goalies
Juuse Saros
Referees:
(Czech Republic) Tomáš Mejzlík
(Czech Republic) Jakub Zeliska

	0-1	03:28 – Mikael Ruohomaa (Vili Saarijärvi, Eemil Erholtz)
08:38 – Marcus Sörensen (Tim Heed, Simon Edvinsson)	1-1
22:10 – Oscar Lindberg (Simon Edvinsson, Tom Willander)	2-1
34:19 – Oskar Steen (Isac Lundeström, Marcus Pettersson)	3-1
38:45 – Anton Bengtsson (Max Friberg, Simon Edvinsson)	4-1
	4-2	48:35 – Lenni Hämeenaho (Ahti Oksanen, Juuso Pärssinen)
52:26 – Oskar Steen (Gabriel Carlsson)	5-2
56:36 – Marcus Sörensen (Oscar Lindberg) (EN)	6-2

12 min
Penalties
16 min
31
Shots
30

4 May 2025; 16:00	Czech Republic	3-5 (1-1, 1-2, 1-2)	Switzerland	Winning Group Arena, Brno; Attendance: 5,881

Game reference

Karel Vejmelka
Goalies
Stéphane Charlin
Referees:
(Sweden) Kristoffer Folkstrand
(Sweden) Johan Wedin

03:45 – Ondřej Kovařčík (Jachym Kondelik) (PP)	1-0
	1-1	08:41 – Dominik Egli (Tyler Moy, Simon Knak)
	1-2	21:40 – Simon Knak (Damien Riat)
	1-3	30:14 – Dominik Egli (Nicolas Baechler, Sandro Schmid)
32:59 – Michal Kovařčík (Ondřej Kovařčík)	2-3
	2-4	45:34 – Tyler Moy (Christian Marti, Damien Riat)
	2-5	50:49 – Dario Rohrbach (Nicolas Baechler)
57:27 – Jakub Flek (SHG)	3-5

12 min
Penalties
12 min
22
Shots
30

== Scoring leaders ==
Pos	Player	Country	GP	G	A	Pts	+/−	PIM	POS
1	Simon Knak	Switzerland	3	2	3	5	+5	0	F
2	Leo Carlsson	Sweden	3	1	4	5	0	0	F
3	Tyler Moy	Switzerland	3	3	1	4	+3	2	F
4	Mika Zibanejad	Sweden	2	2	2	4	+1	0	F
5	Simon Edvinsson	Sweden	3	0	4	4	+1	0	D

GP = Games played; G = Goals; A = Assists; Pts = Points; +/− = Plus/minus; PIM = Penalties in minutes; POS = Position
Source: quanthockey

== Goaltending leaders ==
Pos	Player	Country	TOI	GA	GAA	Sv%	SO
1	Samuel Ersson	Sweden	60:00	2	2.00	93.33	0
2	Arvid Söderblom	Sweden	60:00	2	2.00	92.31	0
3	Sandro Aeschlimann	Switzerland	59:58	2	2.03	89.47	0
4	Daniel Vladar	Czech Republic	58:58	3	2.07	89.29	0
5	Stephane Charlin	Switzerland	59:58	3	2.03	86.36	0
6	Karel Vejmelka	Czech Republic	120:00	7	3.50	86.27	0
7	Juuse Saros	Finland	115:28	9	4.70	85.94	0

TOI = Time on ice (minutes:seconds); SA = Shots against; GA = Goals against; GAA = Goals Against Average; Sv% = Save percentage; SO = Shutouts
Source: hokej
