= 2025 Sweden Hockey Games =

2025 Beijer Hockey Games (Euro Hockey Tour)
Tournament details
- Host countries: Sweden; Switzerland
- Cities: Stockholm; Canton of Bern
- Venues: 2 (in 2 host cities)
- Dates: 6-9 February 2025
- Teams: 4

Final positions
- Champions: Finland (9th title)
- Runners-up: Czech Republic
- Third place: Switzerland
- Fourth place: Sweden

Tournament statistics
- Games played: 6
- Goals scored: 20 (3.33 per game)
- Attendance: 43,241 (7,207 per game)
- Scoring leader: (Finland) Julius Nättinen (4 points)

Official website
- swehockey

The 2025 Beijer Hockey Games was played between 6 and 9 February 2025. The Czech Republic, Finland, Sweden and Switzerland played a round-robin for a total of three games per team and six games in total. One match was played in Canton of Bern, Switzerland and the rest of the matches were played in Stockholm, Sweden. Finland won the tournament. The tournament was part of 2024–25 Euro Hockey Tour.

== Standings ==
Pos	Team	Pld	W	OTW	OTL	L	GF	GA	GD	Pts
1	Finland	3	2	1	0	0	8	1	+7	8
2	Czech Republic	3	2	0	0	1	7	4	+3	6
3	Switzerland	3	0	1	1	1	2	5	−3	3
4	Sweden	3	0	0	1	2	3	10	−7	1

Source: swehockey

== Games ==
All times are local. Stockholm – (Central European Time – UTC+1) Canton of bern – (Central European Time – UTC+1)

6 February 2025; 19:00	Czech Republic	4-1 (1-1, 1-0, 2-0)	Sweden	Avicii Arena, Stockholm; Attendance: 9,137

Game reference

Josef Kořenář
Goalies
Linus Söderström
Referees:
(Finland) Joonas Kova
(Finland) Anssi Salonen
Linesmen:
(Sweden) Mathias Naperotti
(Sweden) Andréas Svensson

02:32 – Chlapík (Zohorna)	1-0
	1-1	03:57 – Hartmann (Lindberg, Berglund)
35:13 – Zboril (Kunc, Reichel)	2-1
49:50 – Lenc (Tichacek, Kousal) (PP)	3-1
59:42 – Reichel) (EN)	4-1

10 min
Penalties
6 min
20
Shots
21

6 February 2025; 19:45	Switzerland	0-1 GWS (0-0, 0-0, 0-0) (OT: 0–0) (SO: 0–1)	Finland	Ilfishalle, Canton of Bern; Attendance: 6,000

Game reference
Sandro Aeschlimann	Goalies	Lassi Lehtinen	Referees: (Czech Republic) Antonin Jerabek (Czech Republic) Tomas Mejzlik; Linesmen: (Switzerland) Dominik Altmann (Switzerland) Dominik Schlegel
C.Bertschy (miss); S.Schmid (miss); L.Fazzini (miss); D.Rohrbach; D.Egli (miss)	Shootout	S.Maenalanen; H.Borgström; (miss) O.Kapanen; (miss) A.Oksanen	Referees: (Czech Republic) Antonin Jerabek (Czech Republic) Tomas Mejzlik; Linesmen: (Switzerland) Dominik Altmann (Switzerland) Dominik Schlegel
2 min	Penalties	6 min	Referees: (Czech Republic) Antonin Jerabek (Czech Republic) Tomas Mejzlik; Linesmen: (Switzerland) Dominik Altmann (Switzerland) Dominik Schlegel
31	Shots	30	Referees: (Czech Republic) Antonin Jerabek (Czech Republic) Tomas Mejzlik; Linesmen: (Switzerland) Dominik Altmann (Switzerland) Dominik Schlegel

8 February 2025; 12:00	Finland	3-0 (0-0, 3-0, 0-0)	Czech Republic	Avicii Arena, Stockholm; Attendance: 2,751

Game reference

Oskari Salminen
Goalies
Dominik Pavlat
Referees:
(Sweden) Tobias Björk
(Sweden) Christoffer Holm
Linesmen:
(Sweden) Ludvig Lundgren
(Sweden) Gustav Jonsson

21:16 – Keskinen (Nättinen, Laaksonen)	1-0
29:18 – Repo (Ruohomaa, Nättinen)	2-0
35:34 – Kapanen (Nättinen, Leppänen) (PP)	3-0

4 min
Penalties
2 min
30
Shots
20

8 February 2025; 16:00	Sweden	1-2 OT (1-0, 0-0, 0-1) (OT: 0–1)	Switzerland	Avicii Arena, Stockholm; Attendance: 10,631

Game reference

Arvid Holm
Goalies
Kevin Pasche
Referees:
(Russia)
(Russia)
Linesmen:
(Sweden)
(Sweden)

06:28 – Berglund (Dahlbeck, Everberg)	1-0
	1-1	53:46 – Baechler (Knak, Bertschy)
	1-2	63:18 – Thurkauf (Bertschy)

2 min
Penalties
29 min
25
Shots
32

9 February 2025; 12:00	Switzerland	0-3 (0-0, 0-1, 0-2)	Czech Republic	Avicii Arena, Stockholm; Attendance: 1,437

Game reference

Sandro Aeschlimann
Goalies
Josef Kořenář
Referees:
(Russia)
(Russia)
Linesmen:
(Sweden)
(Sweden)

0-1	27:28 – Horky (Filip, Fridrich)
0-2	58:36 – Kunc
0-3	59:26 – Zohorna (Chlapík, Fridrich)

8 min
Penalties
4 min
26
Shots
30

9 February 2025; 16:00	Sweden	1-4 (0-2, 0-1, 1-1)	Finland	Avicii Arena, Stockholm; Attendance: 13,285

Game reference

Arvid Holm
Goalies
Lassi Lehtinen
Referees:
(Russia)
(Russia)
Linesmen:
(Sweden)
(Sweden)

	0-1	04:43 – Erholtz (Björninen, Mäntykivi)
	0-2	14:35 – Pulli (Kossila, Nättinen)
	0-3	30:11 – Maenalanen (Kossila)
	0-4	42:06 – Mäntykivi (Almari)
57:33 – Tömmernes (Andersson) (PP)	1-4

20 min
Penalties
20 min
25
Shots
19

== Scoring leaders ==
Pos	Player	Country	GP	G	A	Pts	+/−	PIM	POS
1	Julius Nättinen	Finland	3	0	4	4	+3	0	LW
2	Filip Chlapík	Czech Republic	3	1	1	2	+2	0	CE
3	Kristian Reichel	Czech Republic	3	1	1	2	+2	0	LW
3	Michal Kunc	Czech Republic	3	1	1	2	+2	0	RW
5	Filip Berglund	Sweden	3	1	1	2	+2	2	RD

GP = Games played; G = Goals; A = Assists; Pts = Points; +/− = Plus/minus; PIM = Penalties in minutes; POS = Position
Source: swehockey

== Goaltending leaders ==
Pos	Player	Country	TOI	GA	GAA	Sv%	SO
1	Sandro Aeschlimann	Switzerland	123:57	1	0.48	98.25	1
2	Lassi Lehtinen	Finland	125:00	1	0.48	98.21	1
3	Josef Kořenář	Czech Republic	99:52	1	0.60	97.87	1
4	Arvid Holm	Sweden	124:46	6	2.92	88.24	0

TOI = Time on ice (minutes:seconds); SA = Shots against; GA = Goals against; GAA = Goals Against Average; Sv% = Save percentage; SO = Shutouts
Source: swehockey
