= Julius Nättinen =

Finnish ice hockey player (born 1997)

- Born: 14 January 1997 (age 29) Jyväskylä, Finland
- Height: 6 ft 2 in (188 cm)
- Weight: 201 lb (91 kg; 14 st 5 lb)
- Position: Forward
- Shoots: Left
- NL team Former teams: HC Ajoie; JYP Jyväskylä; HC Ambrì-Piotta; Växjö Lakers; HIFK
- NHL draft: 59th overall, 2015; Anaheim Ducks
- Playing career: 2013–present

Julius Nättinen (born 14 January 1997) is a Finnish professional ice hockey forward who is currently playing with HC Ajoie of the National League (NL). He was drafted by the Anaheim Ducks in the second round, 59th overall, in the 2015 NHL entry draft.

== Playing career ==
Nättinen played as a youth in his native Finland and made his Liiga debut playing a solitary game with JYP Jyväskylä during the 2013–14 season.

On 16 July 2015, Nättinen was signed to a three-year entry-level contract by the Anaheim Ducks. He left Finland after the draft to continue his development playing major junior hockey in the Ontario Hockey League (OHL) after he was selected by the Barrie Colts, 51st overall in the CHL Import Draft in 2015.

After his rookie season in the OHL with the Colts in the 2015–16 season and having scored 71 points in just 52 games, Nättinen was traded to the Windsor Spitfires on 26 June 2016.

In his first North American professional season, Nättinen was assigned to the Ducks' American Hockey League (AHL) affiliate, the San Diego Gulls, for the duration of the 2017–18 season. Unable to find his scoring touch, Nättinen produced just 4 goals in 55 games. Following the Ducks' 2018 training camp, Nättinen was among the first round of cuts and rather than return to the AHL, opted for a mutual release from his contract with the Ducks on 24 September 2018.

Following the termination of his NHL contract, Nättinen returned to his original Liiga club, JYP Jyväskylä, securing a three-year contract on 25 September 2018. Nättinen led Liiga with 33 goals scored in the 2019–20 season.

On July 3, 2020, Nättinen signed a one-year contract with HC Ambrì-Piotta of the National League (NL). He was forced to sit out the first two weeks of the regular season in early October with a groin strain. Nättinen then went on to score 12 goals in his first 10 regular season games. He finished his lone season in Switzerland with 17 goals and 25 points through 32 games.

On 20 May 2021, Nättinen moved to Sweden as a free agent, agreeing to a one-year contract with reigning champions Växjö Lakers of the Swedish Hockey League (SHL).

After a lone season with Växjö, Nättinen left at the conclusion of his contract with returned to the Finnish Liiga in agreeing to a two-year contract with HIFK on 10 May 2022.

== Career statistics ==
=== Regular season and playoffs ===
			Regular season					Playoffs
Season	Team	League	GP	G	A	Pts	PIM	GP	G	A	Pts	PIM
2013–14	JYP-Akatemia	Mestis	5	0	0	0	0	—	—	—	—	—
2013–14	JYP	Liiga	1	0	0	0	2	—	—	—	—	—
2014–15	JYP-Akatemia	Mestis	39	11	18	29	8	6	0	0	0	2
2014–15	JYP	Liiga	9	0	3	3	0	—	—	—	—	—
2015–16	Barrie Colts	OHL	52	22	49	71	18	12	2	6	8	0
2016–17	Windsor Spitfires	OHL	51	13	25	38	16	7	1	3	4	4
2017–18	San Diego Gulls	AHL	55	4	8	12	10	—	—	—	—	—
2018–19	JYP	Liiga	41	10	13	23	6	2	0	0	0	2
2019–20	JYP	Liiga	54	33	22	55	22	—	—	—	—	—
2020–21	HC Ambrì-Piotta	NL	32	17	8	25	4	—	—	—	—	—
2021–22	Växjö Lakers	SHL	33	8	12	20	0	4	1	0	1	0
2022–23	HIFK	Liiga	38	12	20	32	8	12	2	4	6	0
2023–24	HIFK	Liiga	60	23	20	43	0	7	2	3	5	2
2024–25	HC Ajoie	NL	52	22	30	52	8	—	—	—	—	—
2025–26	HC Ajoie	NL	42	19	14	33	4	—	—	—	—	—
Liiga totals			203	78	78	156	38	21	4	7	11	4
AHL totals			55	4	8	12	10	—	—	—	—	—
NL totals			126	58	52	110	16	—	—	—	—	—
SHL totals			33	8	12	20	0	4	1	0	1	0

=== International ===
Year	Team	Event	Result	GP	G	A	Pts	PIM
2013	Finland	U17	7th	5	1	0	1	0
2014	Finland	IH18	5th	4	1	6	7	0
2015	Finland	U18	2nd place, silver medalist(s)	7	2	2	4	2
2016	Finland	WJC	1st place, gold medalist(s)	7	1	2	3	2
2017	Finland	WJC	9th	6	0	1	1	2
Junior totals				29	5	11	16	6
