= 2024–25 Euro Hockey Tour =

Tournament details
- Venues: 8 (in 8 host cities)
- Dates: 7 November 2024 – 4 May 2025
- Teams: 4

Final positions
- Champions: Czech Republic (4th title)
- Runners-up: Finland
- Third place: Switzerland
- Fourth place: Sweden

Tournament statistics
- Games played: 24
- Goals scored: 123 (5.13 per game)
- Attendance: 138,315 (5,763 per game)
- Scoring leader: (Finland) Harri Pesonen (7 points)

The 2024–25 Euro Hockey Tour was the 29th season of Euro Hockey Tour. It started in November 2024 and lasted until May 2025. It consisted of Karjala Tournament, Swiss Ice Hockey Games, Beijer Hockey Games and Czech Hockey Games.

== Standings ==
Pos	Team	Pld	W	OTW	OTL	L	GF	GA	GD	Pts
1	Czech Republic	12	8	0	0	4	36	27	+9	24
2	Finland	12	5	2	0	5	30	29	+1	19
3	Switzerland	12	3	2	2	5	26	29	−3	15
4	Sweden	12	4	0	2	6	31	38	−7	14

Source: Euro Hockey Tour

== Karjala Tournament ==
The Karjala Tournament was played between 7–10 November 2024. Five matches were played in Helsinki, Finland and one match in Karlovy Vary, Czech Republic. Tournament was won by Finland.

Pos	Team	Pld	W	OTW	OTL	L	GF	GA	GD	Pts
1	Finland	3	2	1	0	0	12	6	+6	8
2	Czech Republic	3	2	0	0	1	10	8	+2	6
3	Switzerland	3	0	1	1	1	8	11	−3	3
4	Sweden	3	0	0	1	2	9	14	−5	1

Source: Leijonat.com

7 November 2024
Czech Republic	5–2	Sweden
Switzerland	2–3 (OT)	Finland
9 November 2024
Sweden	3–4 (GWS)	Switzerland
Finland	4–0	Czech Republic
10 November 2024
Czech Republic	5–2	Switzerland
Finland	5–4	Sweden

== SWISS Ice Hockey Games ==
The 2024 SWISS Ice Hockey Games was played between 12 and 15 December 2024. Five matches was played in BCF Arena, Fribourg, Switzerland and one match in Enteria arena, Pardubice, Czech Republic. Tournament was won by Czech Republic.

Pos	Team	Pld	W	OTW	OTL	L	GF	GA	GD	Pts
1	Czech Republic	3	3	0	0	0	10	4	+6	9
2	Finland	3	1	0	0	2	4	4	0	3
3	Sweden	3	1	0	0	2	7	9	−2	3
4	Switzerland	3	1	0	0	2	2	6	−4	3

Source: Leijonat.com

12 December 2024
Finland	1–3	Czech Republic
Sweden	4–1	Switzerland
14 December 2024
Finland	3–0	Sweden
Switzerland	0–2	Czech Republic
15 December 2024
Czech Republic	5–3	Sweden
Switzerland	1–0	Finland

== Beijer Hockey Games ==
The 2025 Beijer Hockey Games was played between 6–9 February 2025. Five matches was played in Avicii Arena, Stockholm, Sweden and one match in Ilfishalle, Canton of Bern, Switzerland. Tournament was won by Finland.

Pos	Team	Pld	W	OTW	OTL	L	GF	GA	GD	Pts
1	Finland	3	2	1	0	0	8	1	+7	8
2	Czech Republic	3	2	0	0	1	7	4	+3	6
3	Switzerland	3	0	1	1	1	2	5	−3	3
4	Sweden	3	0	0	1	2	3	10	−7	1

Source: Leijonat.com

6 February 2025
Czech Republic	4–1	Sweden
Switzerland	0–1 (GWS)	Finland
8 February 2025
Finland	3–0	Czech Republic
Sweden	1–2 (OT)	Switzerland
9 February 2025
Switzerland	0–3	Czech Republic
Sweden	1–4	Finland

== Czech Hockey Games ==
The 2025 Czech Hockey Games was played between 1–4 May 2025. Five matches was played in Winning Group Arena, Brno, Czech Republic and one match in Swiss Arena, Kloten, Switzerland. Tournament was won by Sweden.

Pos	Team	Pld	W	OTW	OTL	L	GF	GA	GD	Pts
1	Sweden	3	3	0	0	0	12	5	+7	9
2	Switzerland	3	2	0	0	1	14	7	+7	6
3	Czech Republic	3	1	0	0	2	9	11	−2	3
4	Finland	3	0	0	0	3	6	18	−12	0

Source: Leijonat.com

1 May 2025
Finland	2-4	Czech Republic
Sweden	1-2	Switzerland
3 May 2025
Switzerland	8-2	Finland
Czech Republic	2-4	Sweden
4 May 2025
Sweden	6-2	Finland
Czech Republic	3-5	Switzerland
