= 2020–21 National League (ice hockey) season =

2020–21 National League season
- League: National League
- Sport: Ice hockey
- Duration: October 1, 2020 – March 22, 2021
- Games: 52
- Teams: 12

Regular season
- Best record: EV Zug
- Runners-up: HC Lugano
- Season MVP: Jan Kovář (EV Zug)
- Top scorer: Jan Kovář (EV Zug)

Playoffs
- Semi-Final champions: EV Zug
- Semi-Final runners-up: SC Rapperswil-Jona Lakers
- Semi-Final champions: Genève-Servette HC
- Semi-Final runners-up: ZSC Lions

Swiss champion NL
- Champions: EV Zug
- Runners-up: Genève-Servette HC

National League seasons
- ← 2019–20 2021–22 →

The 2020–21 National League season was the 83rd season of Swiss professional ice hockey and the fourth season as the National League (NL).

ZSC Lions were the defending regular season winners. Due to the 2020 coronavirus outbreak in Switzerland there was no defending champion as the previous season's playoffs were cancelled.

Due to the 2019–20 league qualification series also being cancelled, the participating teams remained the same as the previous season.

The league announced changes to the format ahead of the season, meaning that 52 games rather than 50 would be played in the regular season. The playoffs would also be re-formatted, so that the top 6 teams now qualified directly for the quarter-finals, with the next four teams playing in pre-playoffs for the remaining two spots. There would also be no relegation from the season. The two pre-playoffs series were played in a best-of-three, the quarter-finals in a best-of-seven and the semi-finals and final in a best-of-five. The series were shortened to allow enough time for the national team to prepare for the 2021 IIHF World Championship.

EV Zug won the regular season with 6 games remaining, having already clinched their club record points total, surpassing their previous best of 98 points from the 2011–12 season. With two games remaining EV Zug broke the record for most points in a single regular season, held by HC Davos from the 2010–11 season. Whilst this season was the first to be 52 games in length, EV Zug passed the milestone in the same number of games as the previous record holders.

EV Zug swept Genève-Servette HC 3-0 in the final to win its first NL title since 1998.

== Teams ==
NL teams for the 2020–21 season

Team	City	Arena	Capacity	COVID-19 Capacity
HC Ambrì-Piotta	Ambrì	Valascia	6,500	0
SC Bern	Bern	PostFinance Arena	17,031	0
EHC Biel	Biel/Bienne	Tissot Arena	6,521	0
HC Davos	Davos	Eisstadion Davos	6,800	0
Fribourg-Gottéron	Fribourg	BCF Arena	8,934	0
Genève-Servette HC	Geneva	Patinoire des Vernets	7,135	0
Lausanne HC	Lausanne	Vaudoise Aréna	9,600	0
HC Lugano	Lugano	Cornér Arena	7,800	0
SCL Tigers	Langnau im Emmental	Ilfis Stadium	6,000	0
SC Rapperswil-Jona Lakers	Rapperswil	St. Galler Kantonalbank Arena	6,200	0
ZSC Lions	Zürich	Hallenstadion	11,200	0
EV Zug	Zug	Bossard Arena	7,200	0

== Regular season ==
Due to coronavirus cases in both EHC Biel and SC Bern forcing late season stoppages to training, not all regular season games could be completed, and the league would use points per game to determine the final regular season standings.

Pos	Team	Pld	W	OTW	OTL	L	GF	GA	GD	Pts	Qualification
1	EV Zug	52	33	7	6	6	197	128	+69	119	Advance to Playoffs
2	HC Lugano	52	24	9	2	17	160	137	+23	92	Advance to Playoffs
3	Fribourg-Gottéron	51	26	4	4	17	159	151	+8	90	Advance to Playoffs
4	Lausanne HC	51	23	7	6	15	159	125	+34	89	Advance to Playoffs
5	ZSC Lions	52	24	6	6	16	170	143	+27	90	Advance to Playoffs
6	Genève-Servette HC	50	22	7	4	17	167	129	+38	84	Advance to Playoffs
7	EHC Biel	48	20	6	6	16	149	137	+12	78	Advance to Pre-playoffs
8	HC Davos	51	20	5	4	22	174	177	−3	74	Advance to Pre-playoffs
9	SC Bern	48	15	3	5	25	129	156	−27	56	Advance to Pre-playoffs
10	SC Rapperswil-Jona Lakers	50	15	3	5	27	141	180	−39	56	Advance to Pre-playoffs
11	HC Ambrì-Piotta	51	12	3	8	28	107	158	−51	50	
12	SCL Tigers	52	8	2	6	36	107	198	−91	34	

Source: NLA
Rules for classification: 1) points per game 2) greater number of games played 3) greater number of away games played 4) head-to-head points

== Player statistics ==
=== Scoring leaders ===
The following players led the league in points, at the conclusion of the regular season. If two or more skaters were tied (i.e. same number of points, goals and played games), all of the tied skaters were shown.

Player	Team	GP	G	A	Pts	+/–	PIM
Jan Kovář	EV Zug	52	16	47	63	+24	58
Linus Omark	Genève-Servette HC	49	22	39	61	+8	55
Sven Andrighetto	ZSC Lions	52	27	28	55	+10	18
Enzo Corvi	HC Davos	44	15	37	52	0	16
Roman Červenka	SC Rapperswil-Jona Lakers	49	16	35	51	-1	63
Killian Mottet	Fribourg-Gottéron	50	23	25	48	-1	34
Mark Arcobello	HC Lugano	52	13	35	48	+12	58
Chris DiDomenico	Fribourg-Gottéron	48	15	31	46	-5	48
Daniel Winnik	Genève-Servette HC	49	15	31	46	+8	46
Dario Simion	EV Zug	50	24	21	45	+24	6
Ryan Gunderson	Fribourg-Gottéron	51	9	36	45	+11	8

=== Leading goaltenders ===
The following goaltenders led the league in goals against average, provided that they have played at least 40% of their team's minutes, at the conclusion of the regular season.

Player	Team	GP	TOI	W	WO	LO	L	GA	SO	Sv%	GAA
Tobias Stephan	Lausanne HC	29	1719	12	2	2	9	65	4	.928	2.27
Niklas Schlegel	HC Lugano	42	2359	21	5	2	12	92	6	.928	2.34
Gauthier Descloux	Genève-Servette HC	42	2526	19	4	2	11	100	5	.927	2.38
Luca Boltshauser	Lausanne HC	23	1359	11	2	2	5	54	1	.920	2.38
Ludovic Waeber	ZSC Lions	37	2204	20	4	1	10	88	4	.918	2.40

== Playoffs ==
=== Bracket ===
Pre-playoffs (best-of-3)
7	Biel	0
10	Rapperswil-Jona	2
8	Davos	1
9	Bern	2

Quarter-finals (best-of-7)
1	Zug	4
9	Bern	2
2	Lugano	1
10	Rapperswil-Jona	4
3	Fribourg-Gottéron	1
6	Genève-Servette	4
4	Lausanne	2
5	ZSC Lions	4

Semi-finals (best-of-5)
1	Zug	3
10	Rapperswil-Jona	1
(Pairings are re-seeded after the first and second round)
5	ZSC Lions	0
6	Genève-Servette	3

Finals (best-of-5)
1	Zug	3
6	Genève-Servette	0

=== Pre-playoffs ===
==== (7) EHC Biel vs. (10) SC Rapperswil-Jona Lakers ====
7 April	EHC Biel	1–2	OT	SC Rapperswil-Jona Lakers	Tissot Arena, Biel/Bienne	Recap
Fabio Hofer (1) – 6:41		First period		15:17 – Dominik Egli (1)
No scoring		Second period		No scoring
No scoring		Third period		No scoring
No scoring		First overtime period		16:31 – Dominik Egli (2)
Joren van Pottelberghe (31 shots / 29 saves)		Goalie stats		Melvin Nyffeler (37 shots / 36 saves)

9 April	SC Rapperswil-Jona Lakers	3–1	EHC Biel	St. Galler Kantonalbank Arena, Rapperswil	Recap
No scoring		First period	1:37 – Damien Brunner (1)
Andrew Rowe (1; PPG) – 6:04		Second period	No scoring
Michael Loosli (1) – 2:17; Kevin Clark (1) – 19:13		Third period	No scoring
Melvin Nyffeler (35 shots / 34 saves)		Goalie stats	Joren van Pottelberghe (22 shots / 20 saves)

SC Rapperswil-Jona Lakers win series 2–0

==== (8) HC Davos vs. (9) SC Bern ====
7 April	HC Davos	3–4	OT	SC Bern	Eisstadion Davos, Davos	Recap
Robert Mayer (9 shots / 6 saves); Sandro Aeschlimann (21 shots / 20 saves)		Goalie stats		Tomi Karhunen (60 shots / 57 saves)

9 April	SC Bern	0–3	HC Davos	PostFinance Arena, Bern	Recap
No scoring		First period	8:59 – Aaron Palushaj (1)
No scoring		Second period	No scoring
No scoring		Third period	16:20 – Benjamin Baumgartner (1); 18:25 – Benjamin Baumgartner (2)
Tomi Karhunen (31 shots / 28 saves)		Goalie stats	Sandro Aeschlimann (34 shots / 34 saves)

11 April	HC Davos	0–3	SC Bern	Eisstadion Davos, Davos	Recap
Sandro Aeschlimann (15 shots / 13 saves)		Goalie stats	Tomi Karhunen (53 shots / 53 saves)

SC Bern win series 2–1

=== Quarter-finals ===
==== (1) EV Zug vs. (9) SC Bern ====
13 April	EV Zug	4–2	SC Bern	Bossard Arena, Zug	Recap
Dario Simion (1) – 0:38; Dario Simion (2; PPG) – 07:48		First period	04:24 – Jan Neuenschwander (1)
Carl Klingberg (1; PPG) – 5:52		Second period	15:58 – Colin Gerber (1)
Carl Klingberg (2) – 9:47		Third period	No scoring
Leonardo Genoni (26 shots / 24 saves)		Goalie stats	Tomi Karhunen (43 shots / 39 saves)

15 April	SC Bern	6–2	EV Zug	PostFinance Arena, Bern	Recap
Cory Conacher (1) – 7:14; Jesper Olofsson (1) – 15:44; Ramon Untersander (1) – 18:16		First period	10:29 – Dario Simion (1)
André Heim (1; PPG) – 6:28		Second period	No scoring
Ramon Untersander (2; PPG) – 3:23; Calle Andersson (1; ENG) – 17:20		Third period	11:53 – Gregory Hofmann (1; PPG)
Tomi Karhunen (34 shots / 32 saves)		Goalie stats	Leonardo Genoni (29 shots / 24 saves)

17 April	EV Zug	3–0	SC Bern	Bossard Arena, Zug	Recap
Leonardo Genoni (25 shots / 25 saves)		Goalie stats	Tomi Karhunen (31 shots / 28 saves)

19 April	SC Bern	6–2	EV Zug	PostFinance Arena, Bern	Recap
Eero Elo (1; PPG) – 5:05; Inti Pestoni (1) – 13:22; André Heim (1) – 16:51		First period	1:13 – Yannick Zehnder (1)
No scoring		Second period	12:55 – Justin Abdelkader (1)
Ramon Untersander (1; PPG) – 13:36; Simon Moser (1; ENG) – 16:43; Cory Conacher (1; ENG) – 19:48		Third period
Tomi Karhunen (37 shots / 35 saves)		Goalie stats	Leonardo Genoni (26 shots / 22 saves)

21 April	EV Zug	5–2	SC Bern	Bossard Arena, Zug	Recap
14:02 – Cory Conacher (1; PPG)		First period	Livio Stadler (1) – 1:35; Dario Simion (1) – 6:45
18:56 – Thierry Bader (1)		Second period	Carl Klingberg (1) – 12:15; Lino Martschini (1) – 19:12
		Third period	Geisser Tobias (1; ENG) – 19:56
Leonardo Genoni (25 shots / 23 saves)		Goalie stats	Tomi Karhunen (24 shots / 20 saves)

23 April	SC Bern	0–1	EV Zug	PostFinance Arena, Bern	Recap
Tomi Karhunen (31 shots / 30 saves)		Goalie stats	Leonardo Genoni (15 shots / 15 saves)

EV Zug win series 4–2

==== (2) HC Lugano vs. (10) SC Rapperswil-Jona Lakers ====
13 April	HC Lugano	6–2	SC Rapperswil-Jona Lakers	Cornér Arena, Lugano	Recap
Reto Suri (1) – 3:54		First period	10:29 – Kay Schweri (1; PPG)
Jani Lajunen (1; PPG) – 2:59		Second period	No scoring
Romain Loeffel (1) – 1:54; Dario Bürgler (1) – 2:43; Luca Fazzini (1) – 12:25; Sandro Zangger (1) – 15:40		Third period	2:03 – Leandro Profico (1)
Niklas Schlegel (26 shots / 24 saves)		Goalie stats	Melvin Nyffeler (40 shots / 34 saves)

15 April	SC Rapperswil-Jona Lakers	4–1	HC Lugano	St. Galler Kantonalbank Arena, Rapperswil	Recap
Melvin Nyffeler (42 shots / 41 saves)		Goalie stats	Niklas Schlegel (17 shots / 13 saves)

17 April	HC Lugano	2–3	OT	SC Rapperswil-Jona Lakers	Cornér Arena, Lugano	Recap
Giovanni Morini (1; PPG) – 16:03		First period		14:05 – Michael Loosli (1)
Dominic Lammer (1) – 19:26		Second period		10:51 – Jeremy Wick (1)
No scoring		Third period		No scoring
No scoring		First overtime period		17:21 – Sandro Forrer (1)
Niklas Schlegel (28 shots / 25 saves)		Goalie stats		Melvin Nyffeler (52 shots / 50 saves)

19 April	SC Rapperswil-Jona Lakers	3–1	HC Lugano	St. Galler Kantonalbank Arena, Rapperswil	Recap
Melvin Nyffeler (34 shots / 33 saves)		Goalie stats	Niklas Schlegel (21 shots / 19 saves)

21 April	HC Lugano	3–4	2OT	SC Rapperswil-Jona Lakers	Cornér Arena, Lugano	Recap
Niklas Schlegel (48 shots / 44 saves)		Goalie stats		Melvin Nyffeler (62 shots / 59 saves)

SC Rapperswil-Jona Lakers win series 4–1

==== (3) HC Fribourg-Gottéron vs. (6) Genève-Servette HC ====
13 April	HC Fribourg-Gottéron	2–1	Genève-Servette HC	BCF Arena, Fribourg	Recap
Yannick Herren (1) – 18:59		First period	No scoring
Dave Sutter (1) – 14:38		Second period	No scoring
No scoring		Third period	19:07 – Arnaud Montandon (1)
Reto Berra (24 shots / 23 saves)		Goalie stats	Gauthier Descloux (35 shots / 33 saves)

15 April	Genève-Servette HC	3–1	HC Fribourg-Gottéron	Patinoire des Vernets, Geneva	Recap
Gauthier Descloux (33 shots / 32 saves)		Goalie stats	Reto Berra (33 shots / 31 saves)

17 April	HC Fribourg-Gottéron	3–8	Genève-Servette HC	BCF Arena, Fribourg	Recap
Mauro Jörg (1) – 8:57		First period	12:05 – Eric Fehr (1; PPG)
No scoring		Second period	1:07 – Eliot Berthon (1); 6:51 – Tyler Moy (1); 18:40 – Noah Rod (1)
Benoit Jecker (1) – 12:48; Killian Mottet (2; PPG) – 17:42		Third period	5:02 – Tyler Moy (2); 10:41 – Eric Fehr (2; PPG); 11:05 – Joël Vermin (2; PPG); 11:33 – Tyler Moy (3)
Reto Berra (36 shots / 28 saves)		Goalie stats	Gauthier Descloux (45 shots / 42 saves)

19 April	Genève-Servette HC	4–0	HC Fribourg-Gottéron	Patinoire des Vernets, Geneva	Recap
Gauthier Descloux (4 shots / 4 saves); Daniel Manzato (34 shots / 34 saves)		Goalie stats	Reto Berra (23 shots / 20 saves)

21 April	HC Fribourg-Gottéron	0–5	Genève-Servette HC	BCF Arena, Fribourg	Recap
Reto Berra (42 shots / 47 saves)		Goalie stats	Daniel Manzato (29 shots / 29 saves)

Genève-Servette HC win series 4–1

==== (4) Lausanne HC vs. (5) ZSC Lions ====
13 April	Lausanne HC	3–2	OT	ZSC Lions	Vaudoise Aréna, Lausanne	Recap
Charles Hudon (1; PPG) – 18:22		First period		8:48 – Justin Sigrist (1)
Ronalds Kenins (1) – 11:50		Second period		16:55 – Raphael Prassl (1)
No scoring		Third period		No scoring
Denis Malgin (1) – 6:32		First overtime period		No scoring
Tobias Stephan (39 shots / 37 saves)		Goalie stats		Ludovic Waeber (27 shots / 24 saves)

15 April	ZSC Lions	5–0	Lausanne HC	Hallenstadion, Zürich	Recap
Ludovic Waeber (26 shots / 26 saves)		Goalie stats	Tobias Stephan (32 shots / 28 saves)

17 April	Lausanne HC	0–3	ZSC Lions	Vaudoise Aréna, Lausanne	Recap
Tobias Stephan (27 shots / 25 saves)		Goalie stats	Ludovic Waeber (39 shots / 39 saves)

19 April	ZSC Lions	3–1	Lausanne HC	Hallenstadion, Zürich	Recap
Ludovic Waeber (33 shots / 32 saves)		Goalie stats	Luca Boltshauser (30 shots / 27 saves)

21 April	Lausanne HC	5–2	ZSC Lions	Vaudoise Aréna, Lausanne	Recap
Charles Hudon (1; PPG) – 15:17		First period	3:28 – Raphael Prassl (1)
Denis Malgin (1; PPG) – 19:21		Second period	12:40 – Sven Andrighetto (1)
Christoph Bertschy (1) – 0:31; Lukas Frick (1; PPG; Cory Emmerton (1; ENG) – 19:38		Third period
Tobias Stephan (40 shots / 38 saves)		Goalie stats	Ludovic Waeber (32 shots / 28 saves)

23 April	ZSC Lions	3–0	Lausanne HC	Hallenstadion, Zürich	Recap
Ludovic Waeber (29 shots / 29 saves)		Goalie stats	Tobias Stephan (17 shots / 15 saves)

ZSC Lions win series 4–2

=== Semi-finals ===
==== (1) EV Zug vs. (10) SC Rapperswil-Jona Lakers ====
25 April	EV Zug	6–1	SC Rapperswil-Jona Lakers	Bossard Arena, Zug	Recap
Yannick Zehnder (1) – 7:27; Justin Abdelkader (1) – 8:56; Lino Martschini (1) – 11:36		First period	No scoring
Carl Klingberg (1) – 14:23; Raphael Diaz (1) – 14:46		Second period	10:54 – Kevin Clark (1)
Justin Abdelkader (2) – 13:34		Third period	No scoring
Leonardo Genoni (30 shots / 29 saves)		Goalie stats	Melvin Nyffeler (28 shots / 23 saves); Noël Bader (19 shots / 18 saves)

27 April	SC Rapperswil-Jona Lakers	2–4	EV Zug	St. Galler Kantonalbank Arena, Rapperswil	Recap
Melvin Nyffeler (28 shots / 24 saves)		Goalie stats	Leonardo Genoni (40 shots / 38 saves)

29 April	EV Zug	1–2	SC Rapperswil-Jona Lakers	Bossard Arena, Zug	Recap
Gregory Hofmann (1) – 13:21		First period	9:57 – Daniel Vukovic (1); 9:21 – Nando Eggenberger (1)
No scoring		Second period	No scoring
No scoring		Third period	No scoring
Leonardo Genoni (17 shots / 15 saves)		Goalie stats	Melvin Nyffeler (32 shots / 31 saves)

1 May	SC Rapperswil-Jona Lakers	3–6	EV Zug	St. Galler Kantonalbank Arena, Rapperswil	Recap
No scoring		First period	5:08 – Lino Martschini (1); 15:35 – Sven Senteler (1); 19:27 – Justin Abdelkader (1)
Martin Ness (1) – 8:52; Steve Moses (1) – 11:07		Second period	12:57 – Jan Kovář (1)
Nando Eggenberger (1) – 13:11		Third period	14:31 – Carl Klingberg (1); 18:12 – Sven Leuenberger (1; ENG)
Melvin Nyffeler (34 shots / 29 saves)		Goalie stats	Leonardo Genoni (37 shots / 34 saves)

EV Zug win series 3–1

==== (5) ZSC Lions vs. (6) Genève-Servette HC ====
25 April	ZSC Lions	1–2	Genève-Servette HC	Hallenstadion, Zürich	Recap
Ludovic Waeber (30 shots / 28 saves)		Goalie stats	Daniel Manzato (22 shots / 21 saves)

27 April	Genève-Servette HC	4–1	ZSC Lions	Patinoire des Vernets, Geneva	Recap
Daniel Manzato (36 shots / 35 saves)		Goalie stats	Ludovic Waeber (20 shots / 16 saves)

29 April	ZSC Lions	1–4	Genève-Servette HC	Hallenstadion, Zürich	Recap
Dario Trutmann (1) – 11:38		First period	8:40 – Daniel Winnik (1; PPG)
No scoring		Second period	9:41 – Daniel Winnik (2)
No scoring		Third period	15:58 – Mathieu Vouillamoz (1); 18:30 – Tanner Richard (1; ENG)
Ludovic Waeber (23 shots / 20 saves)		Goalie stats	Daniel Manzato (21 shots / 20 saves)

Genève-Servette HC win series 3–0

=== Final (1) EV Zug vs. (6) Genève-Servette HC ===
3 May	EV Zug	1–0	Genève-Servette HC	Bossard Arena, Zug	Recap
Leonardo Genoni (35 shots / 35 saves)		Goalie stats	Daniel Manzato (30 shots / 29 saves)

5 May	Genève-Servette HC	1–2	EV Zug	Patinoire des Vernets, Geneva	Recap
Daniel Manzato (28 shots / 26 saves)		Goalie stats	Leonardo Genoni (23 shots / 22 saves)

7 May	EV Zug	5–1	Genève-Servette HC	Bossard Arena, Zug	Recap
Leonardo Genoni (35 shots / 34 saves)		Goalie stats	Daniel Manzato (37 shots / 33 saves)

EV Zug win series 3–0
