= Melvin Nyffeler =

Swiss ice hockey player

- Born: December 16, 1994 (age 30); Volketswil, Switzerland
- Height: 5 ft 10 in (178 cm)
- Weight: 185 lb (84 kg; 13 st 3 lb)
- Position: Goaltender
- Catches: Left
- NL team Former teams: SC Rapperswil-Jona Lakers; ZSC Lions; HC Fribourg-Gottéron
- National team: Switzerland
- NHL draft: Undrafted
- Playing career: 2012–present

Melvin Nyffeler is a Swiss professional ice hockey goaltender who is currently playing with the SC Rapperswil-Jona Lakers of the National League (NL). He previously played with the ZSC Lions and with HC Fribourg-Gottéron of the National League (NL).

== Playing career ==
Nyffeler made his professional debut with the GCK Lions in the Swiss League (SL) during the 2012/13 season. He made his National League debut with the ZSC Lions during the 2013–14 season.

On January 27, 2014, Nyffeler was signed to a three-year contract by Genève-Servette HC. The deal fell through and on June 16, 2014, Nyffeler eventually signed a one-year contract with HC Fribourg-Gottéron for the 2014–15 season. Nyffeler spent the next two seasons under contract with EHC Kloten of the NL but mostly played on loan with the SC Rapperswil-Jona Lakers of the SL. He was the starting goaltender for the 2017/18 season with the Lakers, helping the team gain promotion to the NL in April 2018. On October 10, 2018, Nyffeler was signed to a two-year contract extension with the Lakers to be their number one goalie in the NL.

== International play ==
Nyffeler made his debut with the Switzerland men's national team in December 2019.

== Career statistics ==
=== International ===
Year	Team	Event	Result	GP	W	L	T/OTL	MIN	GA	SO	GAA	SV%
2021	Switzerland	WC	6th	2	0	0	0	49	4	0	4.84	.846
Senior totals				2	0	0	0	49	4	0	4.84	.846
