= Daniel Gazda =

Czech ice hockey player

- Born: 13 August 1997 (age 28) Zlín, Czech Republic
- Height: 6 ft 1 in (185 cm)
- Weight: 207 lb (94 kg; 14 st 11 lb)
- Position: Defence
- Shoots: Right
- Czech Extraliga team: HC Dynamo Pardubice
- Played for: RI Okna Berani Zlín; HC Kometa Brno; Ilves
- Playing career: 2017–present

Daniel Gazda (born 13 August 1997) is a Czech professional ice hockey defenceman for HC Dynamo Pardubice of the Czech Extraliga.

Gazda has been with hometown team since 2012 and made his debut for the senior team during the 2016–17 Czech Extraliga season. He has also had loan spells in Chance Liga for HC ZUBR Přerov and HC RT Torax Poruba and in the 2. Liga for SHK Hodonín.

Gazda signed a long-term extension with Zlín on 15 April 2020.
