= Simon Edvinsson =

Swedish ice hockey player (born 2003)

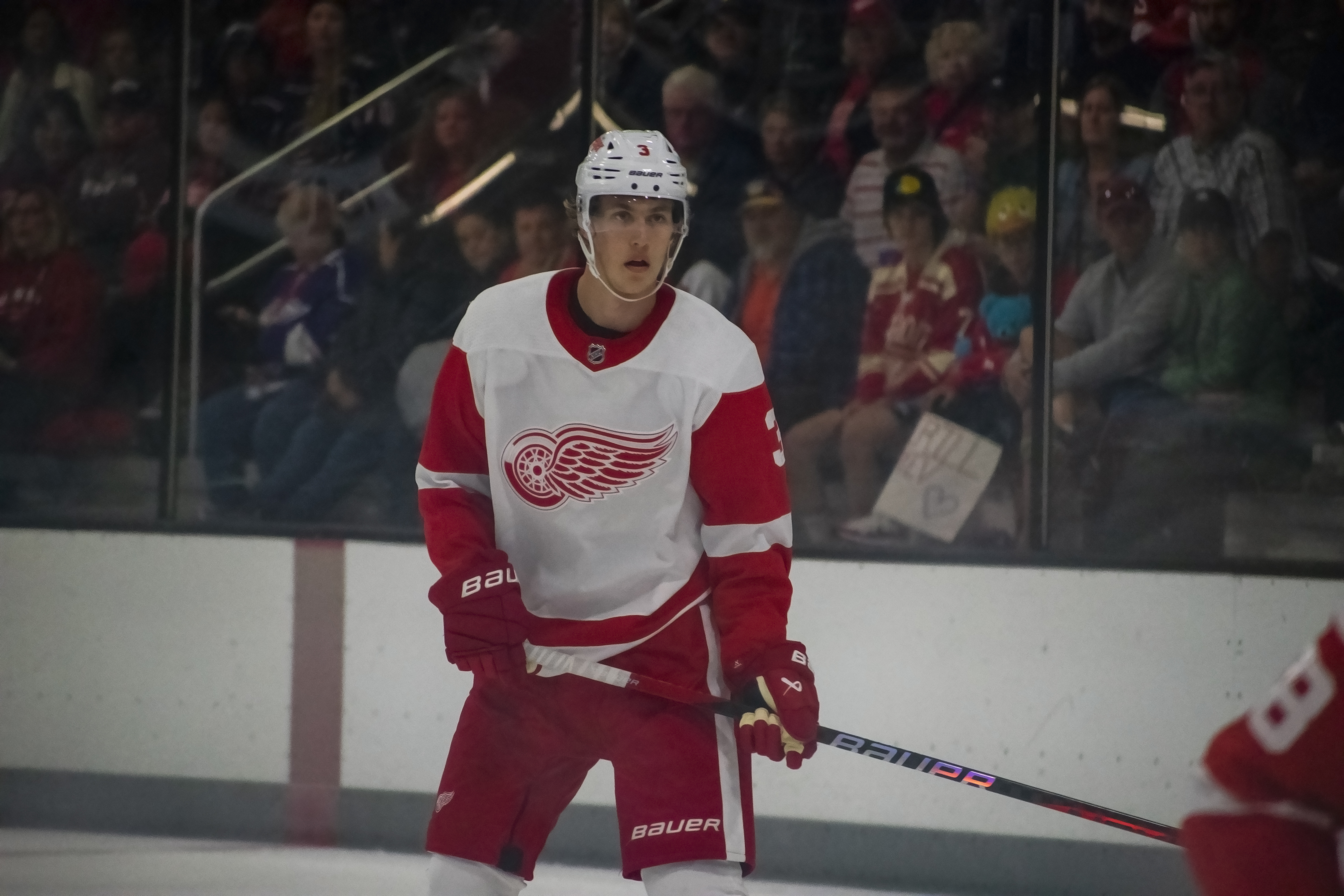
- Simon Edvinsson in action at the NHL Prospects Tournament.
- Born: 5 February 2003 (age 23) Onsala, Sweden
- Height: 6 ft 6 in (198 cm)
- Weight: 207 lb (94 kg; 14 st 11 lb)
- Position: Defence
- Shoots: Left
- NHL team Former teams: Detroit Red Wings; Frölunda HC
- National team: Sweden
- NHL draft: 6th overall, 2021; Detroit Red Wings
- Playing career: 2020–present

Simon Edvinsson (born 5 February 2003) is a Swedish professional ice hockey player who is a defenceman for the Detroit Red Wings of the National Hockey League (NHL). Edvinsson was selected in the first round, sixth overall, by the Red Wings in the 2021 NHL entry draft.

== Playing career ==
Edvinsson scoring an empty net goal for the Grand Rapids Griffins

Edvinsson had six points in 14 games playing for Frölunda HC's junior team in the J20 SuperElit, before making his professional debut in the Swedish Hockey League (SHL) during the 2020–21 season, posting 1 assist in 10 games for Frölunda. Following the season, Edvinsson was the top ranked European defenseman by the NHL Central Scouting Bureau. Behind Luke Hughes, Edvinsson was the third defenseman selected in the 2021 NHL entry draft, chosen sixth overall by the Detroit Red Wings on 23 July 2021.

In the 2021–22 season, his first full season in the SHL, Edvinsson has recorded 19 points in 44 regular season games from the blueline for Frölunda HC. He was named a finalist for the SHL Rookie of the Year Award and led all league rookies with an average of 19:46 time on ice. His 19 points were fourth-most all time for a defenseman under the age of 19 in the SHL. Following a semi-final defeat in the playoffs, Edvinsson was signed by Red Wings to a three-year, entry-level contract on 25 April 2022.

After participating in the Detroit Red Wings 2022 training camp, Edvinsson was reassigned to begin his first North American season in 2022–23 with AHL affiliate, the Grand Rapids Griffins, where he played alongside Brian Lashoff. In transitioning to the North American smaller rink, Edvinsson was immediately deployed in a top-pairing role with the Griffins, contributing offensively from the blueline. While leading the team amongst defenseman in scoring, Edvinsson received his first recall to the NHL by the Red Wings on 17 March 2023. He made his NHL debut with the Red Wings the following day, registering 2 penalty minutes in a third-pairing role alongside fellow Swede Robert Hägg, during a 5–1 defeat to the Colorado Avalanche.

During the 2025-26 season, Edvinsson was ranked second in goals and plus-minus as a defenseman, with six goals and 11 assists in 48 games and averages more than 22 minutes of play time per game, by the end of January 2026. During the season he is frequently paired with Moritz Seider with the pair having almost 700 minutes of play time together as of January 2026, and outscoring opponents 31-21 at five on five plays. In February 2026 Edvinsson underwent minor knee surgery after slightly injuring it during a game against the Maple Leafs. During the game he had taken a puck to the side of his right knee and struggled to stand and return to play, and even managed to deflect a shot while on his knees before being helped off the ice. Following the 2026 Winter Olympics break and his return from his injury, Edvinsson delivered a big hit on Brady Tkachuk and both received penalties following the hit and continued to argue with one another in their respective penalty boxes. On March 27, Edvinsson was attempting to make a play around Sabres Tage Thompson resulting in Thompsons stick pulling forward and striking Edvinsson in the mouth, causing severe damage to his front teeth.

It is alleged that Edvinsson was requested as part of a potential deal between the Red Wings and Vancouver Canucks to trade for Quinn Hughes, with the Red Wings refusing to trade Edvinsson.

== International play ==
Medal record

Representing Sweden

Ice hockey

World Championships
Bronze medal – third place	2025 Sweden/Denmark	

World Junior Championships
Bronze medal – third place	2022 Canada	

World U18 Championships
Bronze medal – third place	2021 Canada	

Edvinsson represented Sweden at the 2021 IIHF World U18 Championships where he recorded one goal and three assists in seven games and won a bronze medal.

He represented Sweden at the 2022 World Junior Ice Hockey Championships where he recorded one goal and one assists in six games and won a bronze medal.

In April 2025, it was announced that Edvinsson would represent Sweden for the Men's IIHF World Championship in his debut for the tournament, where Sweden won the bronze medal.

== Personal life ==
Edvinsson's father, Tobbe, is a police officer, and his mother, Åsa, is a personal trainer. He has a younger brother, Hannes. During the offseason, Edvinsson trains in mixed martial arts, which he credits for helping him to control his body. He cites Victor Hedman, Miro Heiskanen, and Cale Makar as role models.

In May 2025, Edvinsson stated that through mutual friends he met and became close friends with former Avalanche player and Swedish legend Peter Forsberg, with the two men playing against one another in padel and pentathlon.

== Career statistics ==
=== Regular season and playoffs ===
			Regular season					Playoffs
Season	Team	League	GP	G	A	Pts	PIM	GP	G	A	Pts	PIM
2019–20	Frölunda HC	J20	8	0	6	6	10	—	—	—	—	—
2020–21	Frölunda HC	J20	14	1	5	6	10	—	—	—	—	—
2020–21	Frölunda HC	SHL	10	0	1	1	0	1	0	0	0	0
2020–21	Västerås IK	Allsv	14	0	5	5	0	6	1	2	3	8
2021–22	Frölunda HC	SHL	44	2	17	19	18	5	0	2	2	6
2022–23	Grand Rapids Griffins	AHL	52	5	22	27	52	—	—	—	—	—
2022–23	Detroit Red Wings	NHL	9	2	0	2	12	—	—	—	—	—
2023–24	Grand Rapids Griffins	AHL	54	8	22	30	51	6	0	2	2	6
2023–24	Detroit Red Wings	NHL	16	1	1	2	4	—	—	—	—	—
2024–25	Detroit Red Wings	NHL	78	7	24	31	67	—	—	—	—	—
2025–26	Detroit Red Wings	NHL	72	9	16	25	75	—	—	—	—	—
NHL totals			175	19	41	60	158	—	—	—	—	—

=== International ===
Year	Team	Event	Result	GP	G	A	Pts	PIM
2019	Sweden	U17	6th	5	0	5	5	0
2021	Sweden	U18	3rd place, bronze medalist(s)	7	1	3	4	8
2022	Sweden	WJC	3rd place, bronze medalist(s)	6	1	1	2	2
2025	Sweden	WC	3rd place, bronze medalist(s)	10	0	1	1	0
Junior totals				18	2	9	11	10
Senior totals				10	0	1	1	0

Awards and achievements
Preceded by Lucas Raymond	Detroit Red Wings first-round draft pick 2021	Succeeded by Sebastian Cossa
