= Kalle Kossila =

French-born Finnish ice hockey player

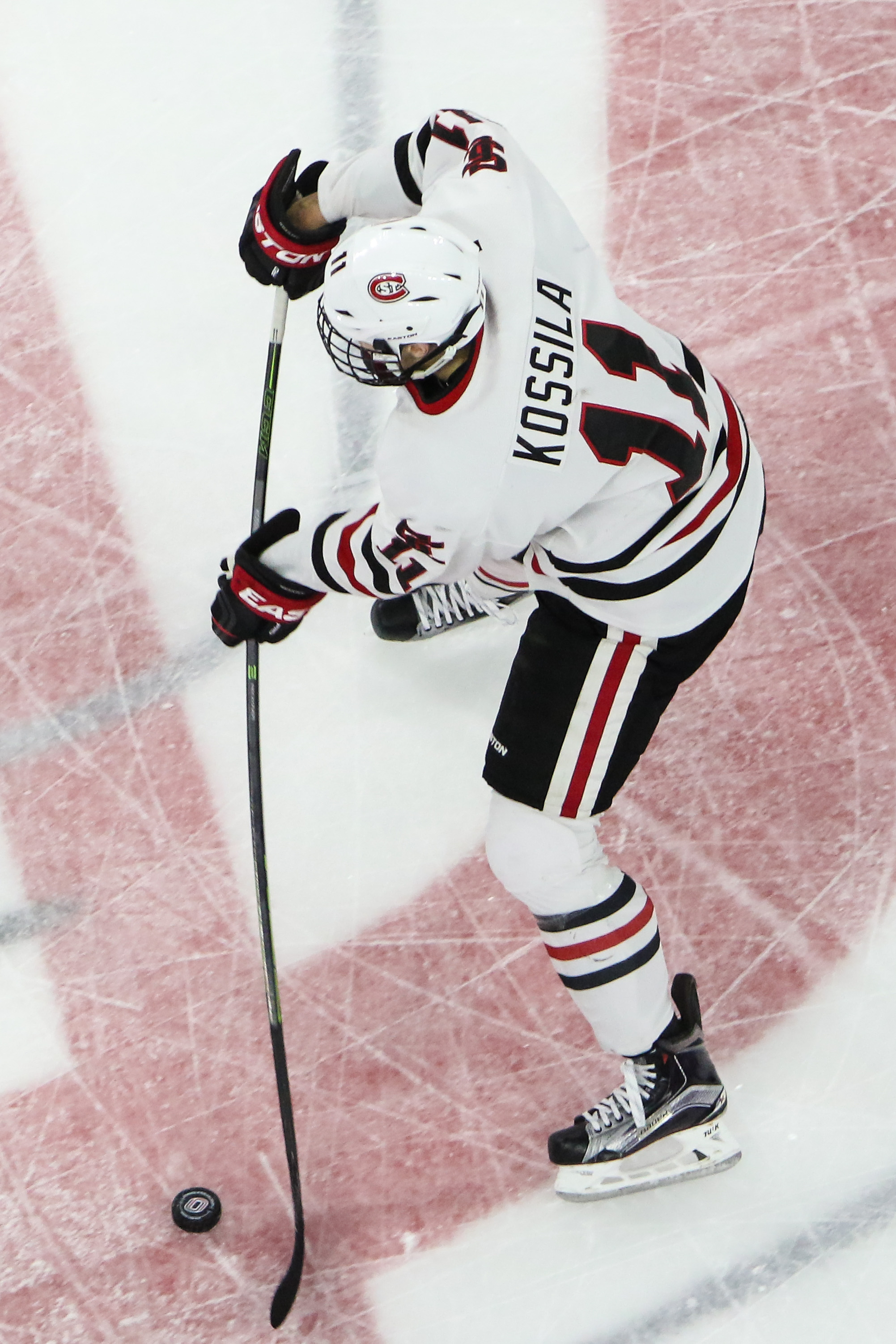
- Kossila with the St. Cloud State Huskies in 2016
- Born: 14 April 1993 (age 33) Neuilly-sur-Seine, France
- Height: 180 cm (5 ft 11 in)
- Weight: 79 kg (174 lb; 12 st 6 lb)
- Position: Centre
- Shoots: Left
- SHL team Former teams: Örebro HK; Anaheim Ducks; EHC München; Jokerit; SC Rapperswil-Jona Lakers; Växjö Lakers
- NHL draft: Undrafted
- Playing career: 2016–present

Kalle Kossila (born 14 April 1993) is a French-born Finnish professional ice hockey centre. He is currently playing for Örebro HK in the Swedish Hockey League (SHL). Kossila spent time in North America as part of the Anaheim Ducks and Toronto Maple Leafs organizations. His biological parents are Finnish.

== Playing career ==
Kossila first played junior hockey in his homeland of Finland, with professional clubs, Jokerit and Espoo Blues before moving to North America to play collegiate hockey on a scholarship with St. Cloud State University of the National Collegiate Hockey Conference.

With strong offensive instincts and top-level speed, Kossila proved as a scoring forward at the collegiate level with the Huskies. His scholastic ability within college was noted at the conclusion of the 2014–15 season as he was awarded the NCHC Scholar-Athlete of the Year. In his senior year with the Huskies in 2015–16, Kossila led the team and co-led the NCHC in scoring, alongside Brock Boeser, with 54 points in 41 games in helping St. Cloud capture the Frozen Faceoff championship.

Kossila completed his collegiate career, ranking second all-time with 105 assists and sixth in points with 153 in 157 games for St. Cloud State. On 31 March 2016, as an undrafted free agent, Kossila agreed to a two-year entry-level contract with the Anaheim Ducks. He immediately joined AHL affiliate, the San Diego Gulls on an amateur try-out basis, and made his professional debut in finishing the regular season with 2 goals and 4 points in 6 games.

In his first full professional season and after attending the Ducks training camp, Kossila was assigned to begin the 2016–17 season with the Gulls. Assuming a top-line role within San Diego, Kossila was amongst the club's leaders in offensive totals before he received his first recall to the Anaheim Ducks on 25 January 2017. He made his NHL debut later that night in a 4–0 defeat to the Edmonton Oilers.

Having left the Ducks as a free agent after four seasons within the organization, Kossila was signed to a two-year, two-way contract with the Toronto Maple Leafs on July 24, 2019.

Approaching his final year under contract with the Maple Leafs, and with the North American 2020–21 season delayed due to the ongoing pandemic, Kossila was loaned by Toronto to join German club, EHC Red Bull München of the Deutsche Eishockey Liga (DEL), on 10 December 2020. He contributed with 5 goals and 12 points in just 13 games in the DEL before returning to the Maple Leafs organization assigned to the Marlies on February 9, 2021.

As a free agent from the Maple Leafs organization, Kossila was signed by Finnish outfit, Jokerit of the Kontinental Hockey League (KHL), agreeing to a two-year contract on 15 June 2021. In the 2021-22 season, Kossila made 39 appearances with Jokerit, collecting 21 points, before the team pulled out of the playoffs due to the Russian invasion of Ukraine. Kossila having left his contract with Jokerit was joined Swiss club, SC Rapperswil-Jona Lakers of the National League (NL) for the remainder of the season.

On 9 May 2022, Kossila moved to the SHL, in agreeing to a two-year contract with the Växjö Lakers.

== Personal ==
Despite some articles Kossila holds only Finnish citizenship.

== Career statistics ==
			Regular season					Playoffs
Season	Team	League	GP	G	A	Pts	PIM	GP	G	A	Pts	PIM
2010–11	Espoo Blues	Jr. A	30	8	11	19	6	12	3	5	8	0
2011–12	Espoo Blues	Jr. A	32	20	37	57	22	4	1	1	2	0
2012–13	St. Cloud State	WCHA	39	15	18	33	12	—	—	—	—	—
2013–14	St. Cloud State	NCHC	38	13	27	40	16	—	—	—	—	—
2014–15	St. Cloud State	NCHC	39	6	20	26	29	—	—	—	—	—
2015–16	St. Cloud State	NCHC	41	14	40	54	14	—	—	—	—	—
2015–16	San Diego Gulls	AHL	6	2	2	4	0	7	2	0	2	2
2016–17	San Diego Gulls	AHL	65	14	34	48	8	10	2	4	6	2
2016–17	Anaheim Ducks	NHL	1	0	0	0	0	—	—	—	—	—
2017–18	San Diego Gulls	AHL	55	21	33	54	26	—	—	—	—	—
2017–18	Anaheim Ducks	NHL	10	1	1	2	0	—	—	—	—	—
2018–19	San Diego Gulls	AHL	44	14	21	35	14	16	3	4	7	2
2018–19	Anaheim Ducks	NHL	8	1	0	1	4	—	—	—	—	—
2019–20	Toronto Marlies	AHL	12	3	3	6	4	—	—	—	—	—
2020–21	EHC München	DEL	13	5	7	12	4	—	—	—	—	—
2020–21	Toronto Marlies	AHL	28	7	22	29	14	—	—	—	—	—
2021–22	Jokerit	KHL	39	7	14	21	6	—	—	—	—	—
2021–22	SC Rapperswil-Jona Lakers	NL	7	2	1	3	2	6	1	0	1	0
2022–23	Växjö Lakers	SHL	28	11	14	25	22	13	3	3	6	4
2023–24	Växjö Lakers	SHL	40	12	22	34	18	8	1	4	5	2
2024–25	Örebro HK	SHL	37	10	19	29	18	3	1	0	1	25
NHL totals			19	2	1	3	4	—	—	—	—	—
KHL totals			39	7	14	21	6	—	—	—	—	—
SHL totals			105	33	55	88	58	24	5	7	12	31

== Awards and honours ==
Award	Year
College
NCHC Scholar Athlete of the Year	2015
NCHC Second All-Conference Team	2016
SHL
Le Mat Trophy champion	2023
