= Santtu Kinnunen =

Finnish ice hockey player

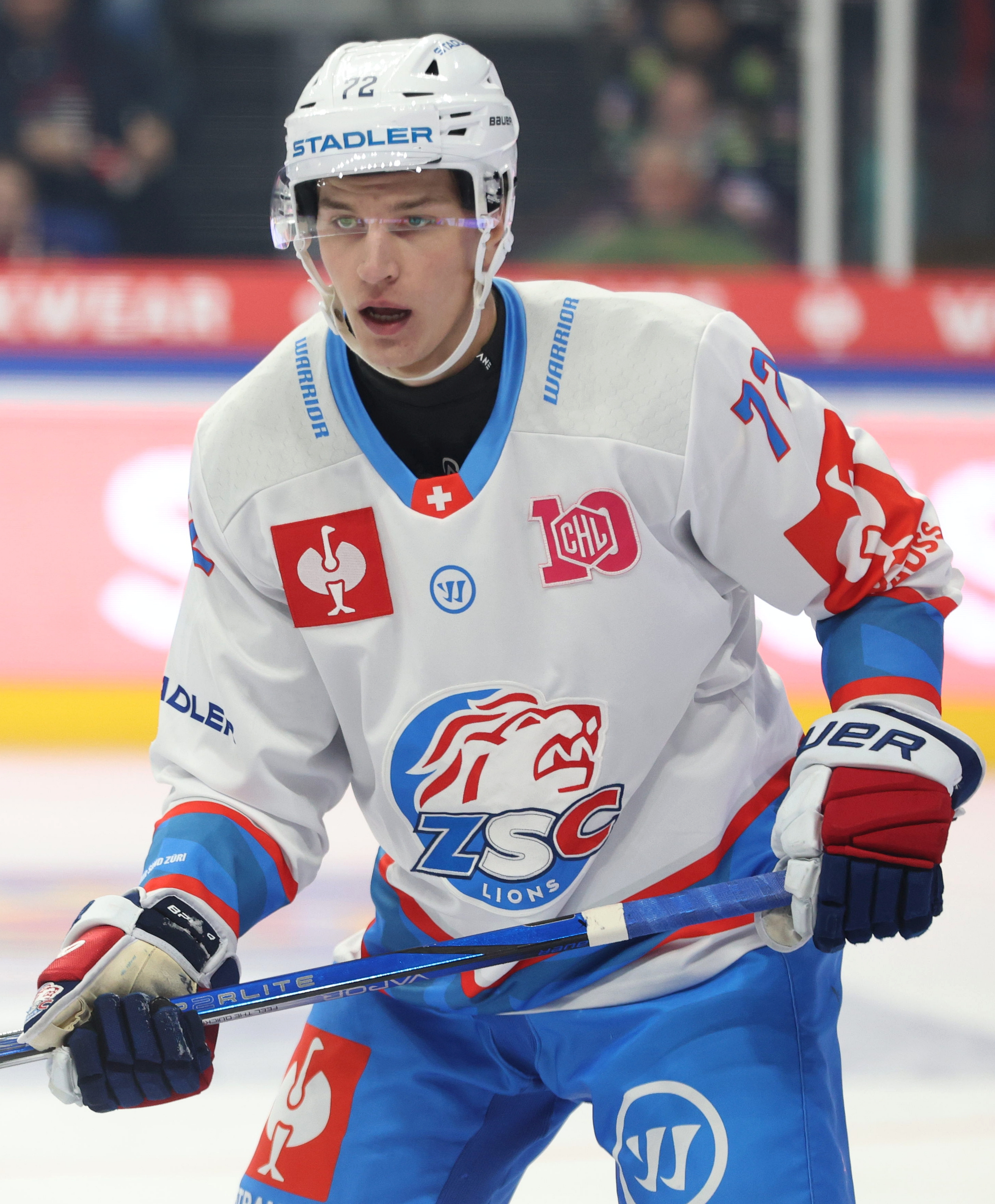
- Santtu Kinnunen in 2024
- Born: 25 March 1999 (age 27) Lahti, Finland
- Height: 6 ft 2 in (188 cm)
- Weight: 161 lb (73 kg; 11 st 7 lb)
- Position: Defence
- Shoots: Right
- NL team Former teams: SCL Tigers; Pelicans; Tappara; ZSC Lions
- NHL draft: 207th overall, 2018; Florida Panthers
- Playing career: 2018–present

Santtu Kinnunen (born 25 March 1999) is a Finnish professional ice hockey defenceman who is currently playing under contract with the SCL Tigers of the National League (NL).

== Playing career ==
Kinnunen played as a youth within the Lahti Pelicans organization before making his professional debut with second tier affiliate, Peliitat Heinola, during the 2017–18 season. Showing promising development on the blueline, Kinnunen was selected by the Florida Panthers in the seventh-round, 207th overall, of the 2018 NHL entry draft.

He made his debut in the Liiga with 27 appearances for Lahti Pelicans during the 2018–19 Liiga season.

Kinnunen played two full seasons with Tappara before he was signed to a two-year, entry-level contract with draft club, the Florida Panthers, on 2 May 2022.

In moving to North America, Kinnunen featured in his first training camp with the Panthers in 2022, before he was re-assigned to begin the 2022–23 season with AHL affiliate, the Charlotte Checkers, on 2 October 2022.

At the conclusion of his entry-level contract with the Panthers, Kinnunen as a pending restricted free agent was not tendered a qualifying offer by the club and was released as a free agent. On 18 July 2024, Kinnunen opted to return to Europe in signing a one-year contract with reigning Swiss champions, ZSC Lions of the NL. In the following 2024–25 season, Kinnunen helped the Lions defend their Swiss title, posting 6 goals and 14 points in 38 regular season games. He made 7 post-season appearances and contributed with 2 points.

During the season, Kinnunen agreed to continue his tenure in the NL, signing an initial one-year contract with the SCL Tigers on 11 December 2025.

== Career statistics ==
			Regular season					Playoffs
Season	Team	League	GP	G	A	Pts	PIM	GP	G	A	Pts	PIM
2016–17	Lahti Pelicans	Jr. A	5	0	1	1	2	—	—	—	—	—
2017–18	Lahti Pelicans	Jr. A	43	4	20	24	22	—	—	—	—	—
2017–18	Peliitat	Mestis	11	0	4	4	2	—	—	—	—	—
2018–19	Lahti Pelicans	Jr. A	13	2	5	7	14	10	0	3	3	2
2018–19	Lahti Pelicans	Liiga	27	1	6	7	4	—	—	—	—	—
2018–19	Peliitat	Mestis	21	1	12	13	35	—	—	—	—	—
2019–20	Lahti Pelicans	Jr. A	6	1	3	4	6	—	—	—	—	—
2019–20	Lahti Pelicans	Liiga	24	0	1	1	14	—	—	—	—	—
2019–20	Peliitat	Mestis	26	2	8	10	26	—	—	—	—	—
2020–21	Tappara	Liiga	59	5	14	19	16	9	2	1	3	0
2021–22	Tappara	Liiga	54	4	19	23	57	13	0	2	2	2
2022–23	Charlotte Checkers	AHL	69	9	26	35	24	7	2	4	6	2
2023–24	Charlotte Checkers	AHL	68	4	17	21	24	3	0	1	1	0
2024–25	ZSC Lions	NL	38	6	8	14	4	7	1	1	2	4
2025–26	SCL Tigers	NL	49	6	22	28	14	—	—	—	—	—
Liiga totals			164	10	40	50	91	22	2	3	5	2
NL totals			87	12	30	42	18	7	1	1	2	4
