= Sebastian Hartmann =

German politician (born 1977)

Member of the Bundestag
- Incumbent
- Assumed office 2013

Personal details
- Born: 7 July 1977 (age 49) Oberhausen, West Germany (now Germany)
- Citizenship: German
- Party: Social Democratic Party of Germany (SPD)
- Education: University of Cologne

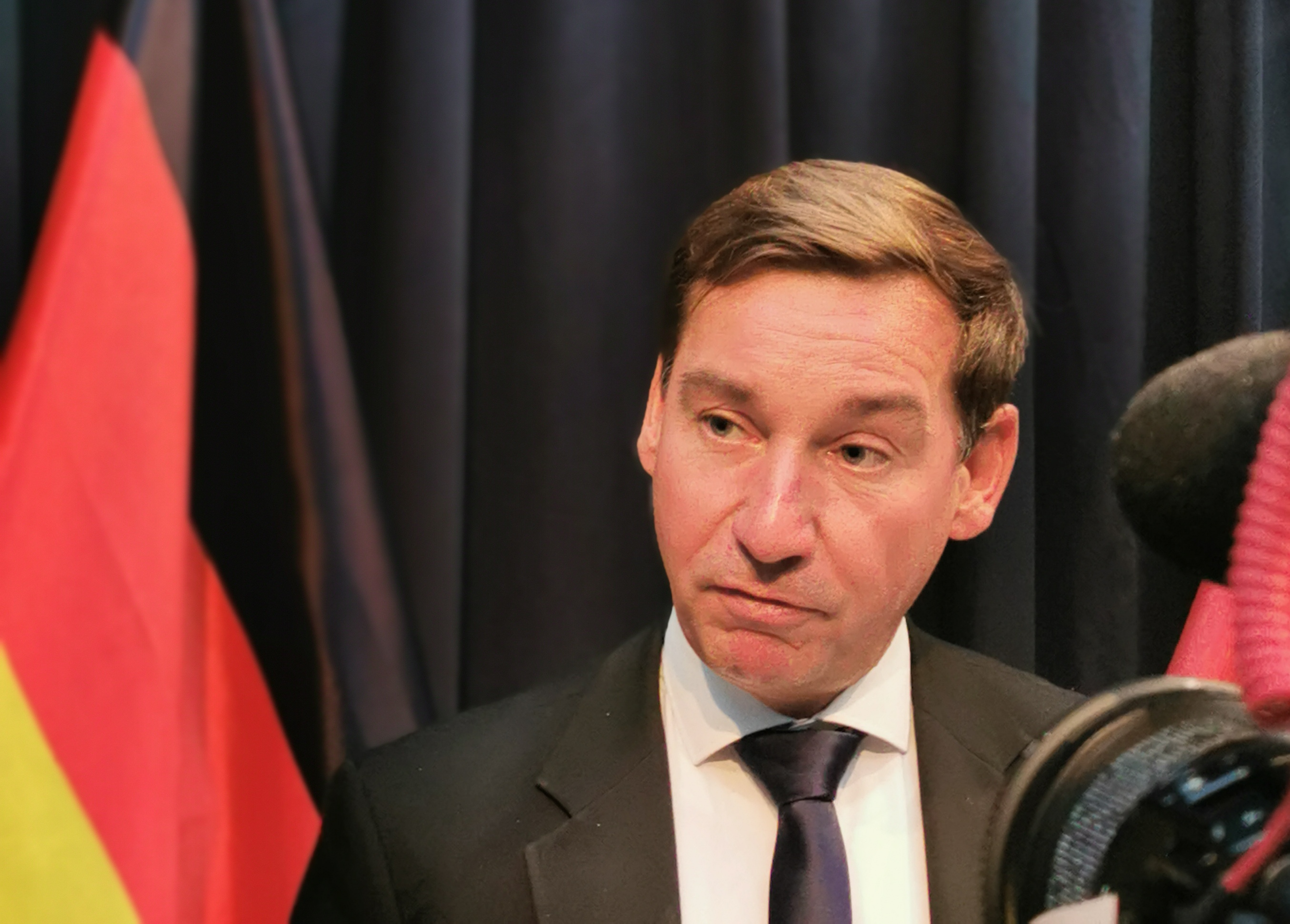
Sebastian Hartmann (2026)

Sebastian Hartmann (born 7 July 1977 in Oberhausen) is a German politician of the Social Democratic Party (SPD) who has been serving as a member of the German Bundestag since 2013.

In addition to his parliamentary work, Hartmann has been serving as a Parliamentary State Secretary at the Federal Ministry of Defence in the government of Chancellor Friedrich Merz since 2025.

Hartmann was the chairman of the SPD in North Rhine-Westphalia from 2018 to 2021 and later served as a member of the SPD parliamentary group executive from 2022 to 2025.

== Early life and career ==
Hartmann grew up in Bornheim-Sechtem. He graduated from the Clara-Schumann-Gymnasium in Bonn in 1996. During his time at school, Hartmann took part in the school Model United Nations workshop as the first Secretary General and subsequently became its managing director. He completed his civilian service in an educational institution.

From the winter semester of 1997/98, Hartmann studied law at the University of Cologne, specialising in international and European law. He received a scholarship from the Friedrich Ebert Foundation for his studies. Hartmann successfully passed the specialisation examination required for the state examination in international and European law. He completed his studies without taking the state examination in order to work as a freelance organizational consultant and personal trainer, a profession he pursued until his election to the Bundestag in 2013.

== Political career ==
=== Career in local politics ===
Hartmann joined the SPD in 1993. He initially held several positions in the Young Socialists in the SPD (Jusos) working group, including as its chairman in the Rhein-Sieg district association. From 2004 to 2010, he was chairman of the SPD in Bornheim, and in 2005 he took over as chairman of the SPD Rhein-Sieg district association. He was most recently re-elected as chairman in October 2021. From 1999 to 2020, he was a member of the Rhein-Sieg district council: initially as financial policy spokesman, a full member of the district committee, the personnel committee and a founding member of the Europe working group. From 2007 to 2014, Hartmann championed regional development as chairman of the SPD district parliamentary group. From 2014 to 2018, he was 2nd Deputy District Administrator of the Rhein-Sieg district.

In 2000, he stood as a candidate for the North Rhine-Westphalian state parliament in the Rhein-Sieg-Kreis III constituency and for the European Parliament in 2009.

Hartmann worked for several years as a personal assistant and office manager to Ulrike Merten, Member of the German Bundestag. From 2011 to 2013, he worked for Martin Schulz, Member of the European Parliament and President of the European Parliament. On 8 April 2018, he was unanimously nominated by the personnel commission of the NRW SPD as state chairman and elected with 80.3% of the votes at the party conference in Bochum on 23 June 2018. After the SPD parliamentary group leader in the North Rhine-Westphalian state parliament, Thomas Kutschaty, announced his own candidacy for the state chairmanship at the next party conference in October 2020, Hartmann resigned from the chairmanship in January 2021.

=== Member of the German Parliament, 2013–presesnt ===
Hartmann stood as a direct candidate in the Rhein-Sieg-Kreis I constituency in the 2013 Bundestag elections. With 29.5% of the first votes in the constituency, he did not win the direct mandate, but entered the German Bundestag via the state list.

In 2013, Hartmann became a full member of the Committee on Transport and Digital Infrastructure and a deputy member of the Finance Committee. For the SPD parliamentary group, he was the rapporteur responsible for transport infrastructure financing (public-private partnerships) and user financing (truck and car tolls) and the infrastructure company as well as the Passenger Transport Act, local public transport, local rail transport and municipal transport financing.

After Christina Kampmann took over as head of the Ministry for Family, Children, Youth, Culture and Sport in the state of North Rhine-Westphalia in October 2015, he also became a member of the Committee for Home Affairs and Integration. There, he was the rapporteur responsible for migration and integration until 2017.

He ran again in the 2017 Bundestag election in the Rhein-Sieg I Bundestag constituency (constituency 96), achieving a significantly better first vote result than the SPD with second votes and retaining his seat on the state list. In 2018, Hartmann became rapporteur for IT security and civil protection and disaster control in the Committee on Internal Affairs. He also became rapporteur for data protection in 2020. Hartmann was also a deputy member of the Finance Committee, the Election Review Committee, the Committee on Transport and Digital Infrastructure and the Board of Trustees of the Federal Agency for Civic Education.

Hartmann has been a member of the Franco-German Parliamentary Assembly since 2019.

In the 2021 Bundestag election, he received 28.5 percent of the first votes in his constituency 96 and once again entered the Bundestag via the state list. As a direct candidate, he received 53,213 first votes, 3,225 more than in 2017. The CDU candidate's lead in this election was reduced from 29,999 to 7,562 votes. In the Bundestag, he was elected domestic policy spokesperson for the SPD parliamentary group in December 2021, and on 24 March 2022 he was also elected as a member of the Parliamentary Control Panel for the Control of Federal Intelligence Services.

Hartmann acted as chairman and chief negotiator for the SPD parliamentary group in the commission on the reform of electoral law and the modernization of parliamentary work. As such, he played a decisive role in the reform of electoral law to reduce the size of the German Bundestag, which was passed in 2023. The reformed electoral law was applied for the first time in the 2025 Bundestag elections. With a fixed size of 630 seats, the Bundestag will be significantly leaner compared to the previous size of 733 MPs. This will save costs and simplify the work.

In the early Bundestag election 2025, Hartmann received 44,274 first votes, which corresponds to a share of 22.4%. The SPD received 17.9% of the second votes in constituency 96, which is a slightly stronger result than the national SPD. After the election, Hartmann again entered the German Bundestag in third place on the North Rhine-Westphalian state list.

== Other activities ==
=== Regulatory agencies ===
- Federal Network Agency for Electricity, Gas, Telecommunications, Posts and Railway (BNetzA), Alternate Member of the Rail Infrastructure Advisory Council (2014-2018)

=== Non-profit organizations ===
- Bonn International Award for Democracy, Member of the Board of Trustees
- Business Forum of the Social Democratic Party of Germany, Member of the Political Advisory Board (since 2020)
- Federal Agency for Civic Education (BpB), Alternate Member of the Board of Trustees (2018–2021)
- IG Bergbau, Chemie, Energie (IG BCE), Member
- German United Services Trade Union (ver.di), Member
- Workers’ Welfare Association (AWO), Member

== Personal life ==
Hartmann is married and has two children.
