= Dario Simion =

Swiss ice hockey player

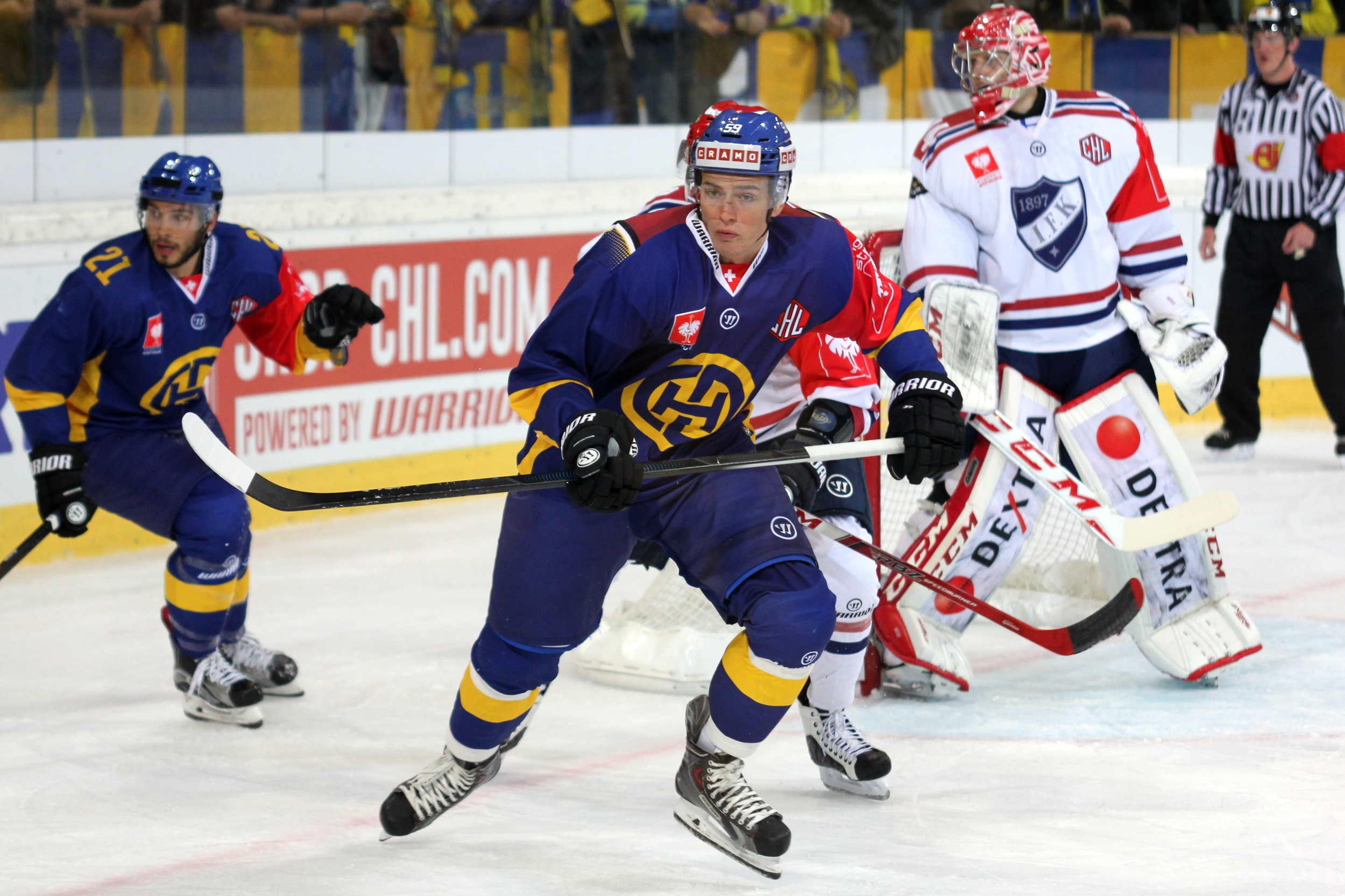
- Simion in 2015
- Born: May 22, 1994 (age 31) Avegno, Switzerland
- Height: 6 ft 2 in (188 cm)
- Weight: 194 lb (88 kg; 13 st 12 lb)
- Position: Forward
- Shoots: Right
- NL team Former teams: HC Lugano; HC Davos; EV Zug
- National team: Switzerland
- Playing career: 2010–present

Dario Simion (born May 22, 1994) is a Swiss professional ice hockey forward who is currently playing for HC Lugano of the National League (NL).

== Playing career ==
Simion joined Davos from HC Lugano on a two-year contract from the 2014–15 season on December 16, 2013. In his first season with Davos, Simion enjoyed a breakout year, registering career high's across the board with 13 goals and 27 points in 47 games to be selected as the NLA media's most improved player for 2015.

On June 6, 2018, Simion unexpectedly dissolved his contract with HC Davos to sign a two-year contract worth CHF 1.2 million with EV Zug.

Following seven seasons in Zug, Simion opted to return to his original club HC Lugano at the conclusion of his contract and signed a six-year contract until 2031 on 31 July 2024.

== International play ==
Medal record

Representing Switzerland

Ice hockey

World Championships
Silver medal – second place	2024 Czechia	

Simion participated at the 2012 World Junior Ice Hockey Championships as a member of the Switzerland men's national junior ice hockey team.

He represented Switzerland at the 2024 IIHF World Championship and won a silver medal.

== Career statistics ==
=== Regular season and playoffs ===
			Regular season					Playoffs
Season	Team	League	GP	G	A	Pts	PIM	GP	G	A	Pts	PIM
2009–10	HC Lugano	SUI U17	27	19	9	28	22	11	2	6	8	4
2009–10	HC Lugano	SUI U20	4	0	0	0	2	—	—	—	—	—
2010–11	HC Lugano	SUI U17	20	17	25	42	14	—	—	—	—	—
2010–11	HC Lugano	SUI U20	18	13	4	17	4	1	0	0	0	0
2010–11	HC Lugano	NLA	1	0	0	0	0	—	—	—	—	—
2011–12	HC Lugano	SUI U20	3	0	1	1	0	1	0	0	0	2
2011–12	HC Lugano	NLA	35	3	3	6	8	1	0	0	0	2
2012–13	HC Lugano	SUI U20	5	5	2	7	0	3	4	1	5	0
2012–13	HC Lugano	NLA	37	3	3	6	10	7	1	0	1	0
2013–14	HC Lugano	SUI U20	4	2	2	4	2	10	4	5	9	0
2013–14	HC Lugano	NLA	42	3	2	5	8	—	—	—	—	—
2014–15	HC Davos	NLA	47	13	14	27	4	15	5	4	9	4
2015–16	HC Davos	NLA	36	7	12	19	6	9	1	1	2	0
2016–17	HC Davos	NLA	50	13	15	28	6	10	0	3	3	2
2017–18	HC Davos	NL	50	5	10	15	0	6	0	0	0	2
2018–19	EV Zug	NL	44	9	5	14	10	14	3	4	7	2
2019–20	EV Zug	NL	49	6	12	18	20	—	—	—	—	—
2020–21	EV Zug	NL	50	24	21	45	6	13	9	3	12	4
2021–22	EV Zug	NL	35	11	14	25	12	15	8	6	14	0
2022–23	EV Zug	NL	51	17	15	32	14	11	4	5	9	4
2023–24	EV Zug	NL	51	16	7	23	6	11	5	3	8	2
2024–25	EV Zug	NL	43	11	10	21	6	4	0	0	0	0
NL totals			621	141	143	284	116	116	36	29	65	22

=== International ===
Year	Team	Event	Result	GP	G	A	Pts	PIM
2011	Switzerland	U18	7th	6	3	0	3	0
2011	Switzerland	IH18	7th	4	0	0	0	2
2012	Switzerland	WJC	8th	6	0	0	0	2
2012	Switzerland	U18	7th	5	1	1	2	0
2013	Switzerland	WJC	6th	6	2	3	5	2
2014	Switzerland	WJC	7th	5	0	0	0	6
2021	Switzerland	WC	6th	6	0	2	2	0
2022	Switzerland	OG	8th	1	0	0	0	0
2022	Switzerland	WC	5th	8	1	3	4	0
2024	Switzerland	WC	2nd place, silver medalist(s)	10	0	2	2	2
Junior totals				32	6	4	10	12
Senior totals				25	1	7	8	2
