= Filip Pyrochta =

Czech ice hockey player (born 1996)

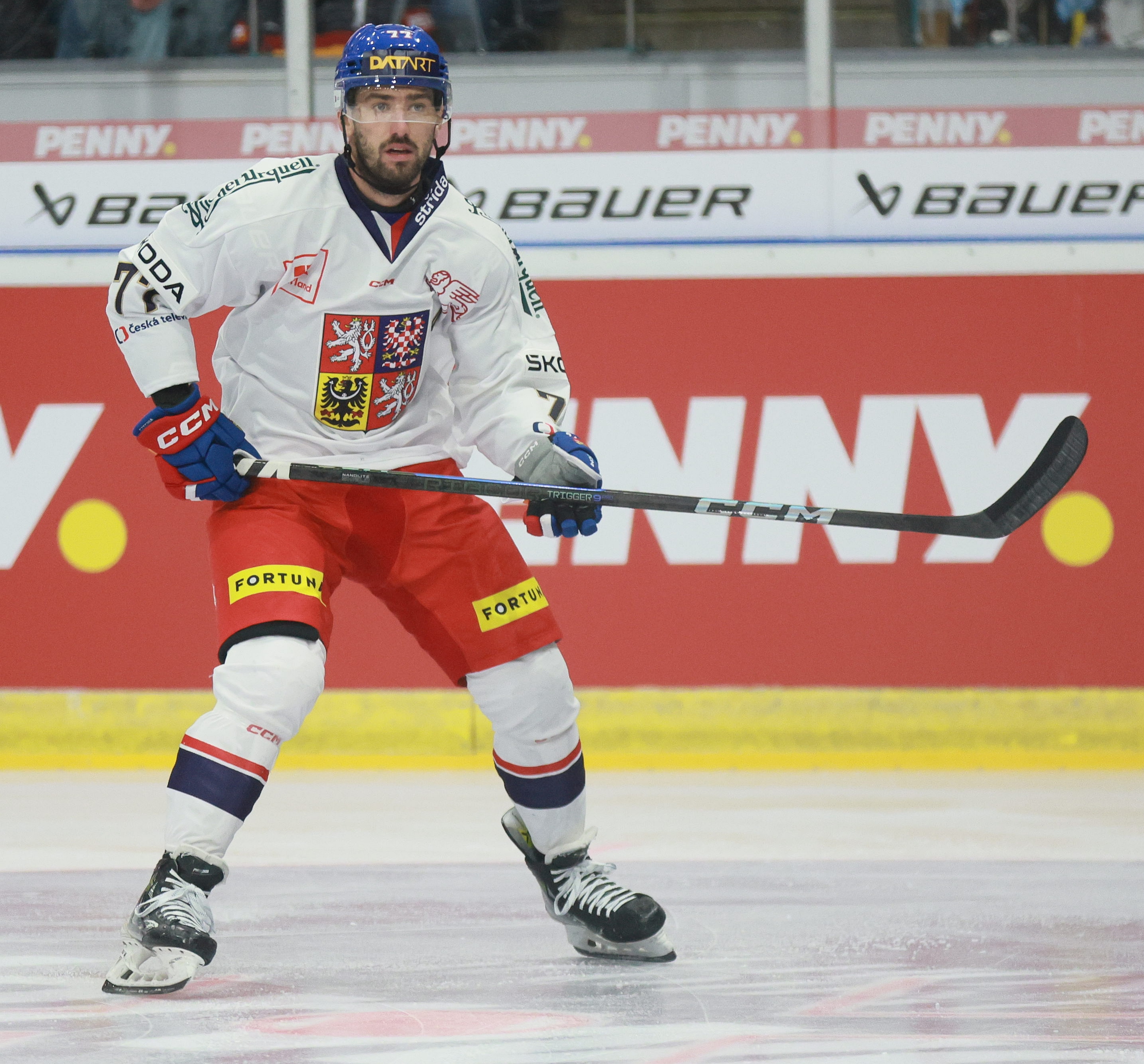
- Pyrochta in 2025
- Born: June 24, 1996 (age 30) Třebíč, Czech Republic
- Height: 6 ft 2 in (188 cm)
- Weight: 192 lb (87 kg; 13 st 10 lb)
- Position: Defence
- Shoots: Left
- ELH team Former teams: BK Mladá Boleslav; HC Bílí Tygři Liberec; Milwaukee Admirals; HC Kometa Brno; HC Vítkovice; SaiPa; Luleå HF
- NHL draft: Undrafted
- Playing career: 2013–present

Filip Pyrochta (born June 24, 1996) is a Czech professional ice hockey defenceman for BK Mladá Boleslav of the Czech Extraliga (ELH). He formerly played with the Milwaukee Admirals of the American Hockey League (AHL) as a prospect under contract with the Nashville Predators of the National Hockey League (NHL).

== Playing career ==
Pyrochta first played as a youth at the under-16 level with SK Horácká Slavia Třebíč before joining HC Bílí Tygři Liberec. He made his professional debut playing a solitary game on loan with HC Benátky nad Jizerou in the Czech 1. Liga during the 2012–13 season. He made his first senior appearance for HC Bílí Tygři Liberec in the 2013 European Trophy.

With an ambition to reach the NHL, Pyrochta opted to continue his development by playing major junior hockey in North America. He was selected in the first round, 23rd overall, by the Victoriaville Tigres of the Quebec Major Junior Hockey League at the 2014 CHL Import Draft.

He played two seasons in the QMJHL, however was left undrafted and returned to HC Bílí Tygři Liberec of the Czech Extraliga for the 2016–17 season. He played his first season in the ELH, posting 6 points from the blueline as Liberec lead the league with 103 points.

In his second season with HC Bílí Tygři Liberec in 2017–18, Pyrochta recorded three goals and 12 points in 42 games as a 21-year-old. On May 7, 2018, having showed a continued development, Pyrochta was signed to a two-year, entry-level contract with the Nashville Predators of the NHL. On May 25, 2019, the Predators and Pyrochta's mutually parted ways, and on May 28, he signed a contract with HC Kometa Brno.

During the 2021–22 season, Pyrochta made 43 regular season appearances with SaiPa in the Liiga before transferring to the SHL in signing a contract with Luleå HF on 15 February 2022.

On 1 May 2023, Pyrochta returned to the Czech Republic as a free agent, signing an initial one-year contract with BK Mladá Boleslav of the ELH.

== Career statistics ==
=== Regular season and playoffs ===
			Regular season					Playoffs
Season	Team	League	GP	G	A	Pts	PIM	GP	G	A	Pts	PIM
2012–13	HC Bílí Tygři Liberec	Czech20	38	4	11	15	28	5	0	2	2	2
2012–13	HC Benátky nad Jizerou	Czech.1	1	0	0	0	2	—	—	—	—	—
2013–14	HC Bílí Tygři Liberec	Czech20	11	3	9	12	6	4	1	1	2	22
2013–14	HC Benátky nad Jizerou	Czech.1	38	1	5	6	26	6	0	0	0	4
2014–15	Victoriaville Tigres	QMJHL	68	9	22	31	39	4	0	1	1	2
2015–16	Victoriaville Tigres	QMJHL	30	1	14	15	14	—	—	—	—	—
2015–16	Val d'Or Foreurs	QMJHL	31	3	11	14	8	6	0	1	1	0
2016–17	HC Bílí Tygři Liberec	ELH	43	2	4	6	10	11	0	1	1	0
2016–17	HC Benátky nad Jizerou	Czech.1	22	5	7	12	18	—	—	—	—	—
2017–18	HC Bílí Tygři Liberec	ELH	42	3	9	12	20	10	0	8	8	2
2017–18	HC Benátky nad Jizerou	Czech.1	12	3	4	7	44	—	—	—	—	—
2018–19	Milwaukee Admirals	AHL	30	0	4	4	0	—	—	—	—	—
2018–19	Atlanta Gladiators	ECHL	21	2	7	9	8	—	—	—	—	—
2019–20	HC Kometa Brno	ELH	50	3	13	16	10	—	—	—	—	—
2020–21	HC Kometa Brno	ELH	23	0	3	3	2	—	—	—	—	—
2020–21	HC Vítkovice	ELH	25	2	8	10	16	5	0	0	0	4
2021–22	SaiPa	Liiga	43	1	7	8	10	—	—	—	—	—
2021–22	Luleå HF	SHL	13	1	1	2	2	17	0	1	1	4
2022–23	Luleå HF	SHL	52	2	4	6	6	10	1	1	2	2
2023–24	BK Mladá Boleslav	ELH	52	5	23	28	12	—	—	—	—	—
ELH totals			235	15	60	75	70	26	0	9	9	6

=== International ===
Year	Team	Event	Result	GP	G	A	Pts	PIM
2013	Czech Republic	U18	7th	5	0	1	1	2
2013	Czech Republic	IH18	3rd place, bronze medalist(s)	4	1	2	3	4
2014	Czech Republic	U18	2nd place, silver medalist(s)	7	1	2	3	0
2025	Czechia	WC	6th	8	1	2	3	0
Junior totals				16	2	5	7	6
Senior totals				8	1	2	3	0
