= Christoph Bertschy =

Swiss ice hockey player (born 1994)

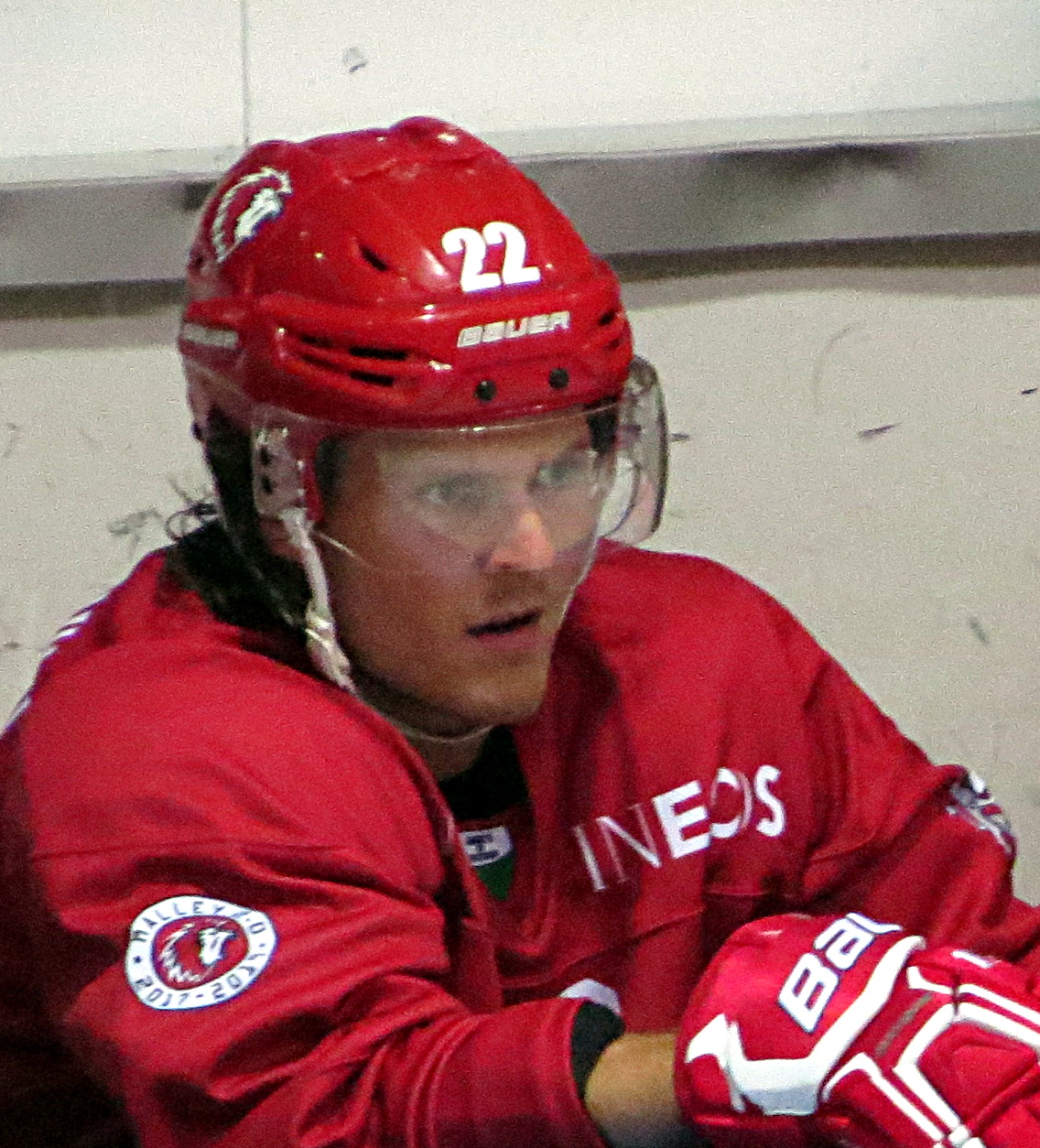
- Bertschy in 2018
- Born: 5 April 1994 (age 32) Le Mouret, Switzerland
- Height: 5 ft 10 in (178 cm)
- Weight: 185 lb (84 kg; 13 st 3 lb)
- Position: Forward
- Shoots: Right
- NL team Former teams: HC Fribourg-Gottéron; SC Bern; Minnesota Wild; Lausanne HC
- National team: Switzerland
- NHL draft: 158th overall, 2012; Minnesota Wild
- Playing career: 2011–present

Christoph Bertschy (born 5 April 1994) is a Swiss professional ice hockey player who is a forward for HC Fribourg-Gottéron of the National League (NL). He was drafted 158th overall by the Minnesota Wild in the 2012 NHL entry draft.

== Playing career ==
Bertschy previously played professionally with SC Bern of Switzerland's National League A. On 26 April 2015, Bertschy was signed to a three-year entry-level contract with the Minnesota Wild.

With his development stalling within the Wild organization, on 8 February 2018, he was traded alongside Mario Lucia to the New Jersey Devils in exchange for Viktor Lööv. He was immediately reassigned to continue with the Binghamton Devils of the AHL.

On 27 April 2018, as a pending restricted free agent with the Devils and unable to cement a role in the NHL, Bertschy opted to return to Switzerland by signing a four-year contract with Lausanne HC of the National League.

== International play ==
Medal record

Representing Switzerland

Ice hockey

World Championships
Silver medal – second place	2024 Czechia	
Silver medal – second place	2025 Sweden/Denmark	
Silver medal – second place	2026 Switzerland	

World Junior A Challenge
Bronze medal – third place	2012 Yarmouth	

Bertschy represented Switzerland at the 2024 IIHF World Championship and won a silver medal.

== Career statistics ==
=== Regular season and playoffs ===
			Regular season					Playoffs
Season	Team	League	GP	G	A	Pts	PIM	GP	G	A	Pts	PIM
2009–10	SC Bern	Elite Jr. A	4	0	1	1	0	—	—	—	—	—
2010–11	SC Bern	Elite Jr. A	36	16	16	32	34	1	0	0	0	2
2011–12	SC Bern	Elite Jr. A	13	7	15	22	22	—	—	—	—	—
2011–12	SC Bern	NLA	31	8	8	16	10	17	1	1	2	8
2012–13	SC Bern	Elite Jr. A	2	2	1	3	2	—	—	—	—	—
2012–13	SC Bern	NLA	41	4	2	6	18	20	2	1	3	2
2013–14	SC Bern	NLA	37	6	8	14	10	—	—	—	—	—
2014–15	SC Bern	NLA	44	14	16	30	26	7	1	2	3	0
2015–16	Iowa Wild	AHL	72	11	24	35	46	—	—	—	—	—
2015–16	Minnesota Wild	NHL	3	0	0	0	0	—	—	—	—	—
2016–17	Iowa Wild	AHL	67	11	13	24	30	—	—	—	—	—
2016–17	Minnesota Wild	NHL	5	0	1	1	4	—	—	—	—	—
2017–18	Iowa Wild	AHL	45	8	9	17	40	—	—	—	—	—
2017–18	Minnesota Wild	NHL	1	0	0	0	4	—	—	—	—	—
2017–18	Binghamton Devils	AHL	26	6	12	18	10	—	—	—	—	—
2018–19	Lausanne HC	NL	50	15	18	33	22	12	3	4	7	16
2019–20	Lausanne HC	NL	50	16	18	34	40	—	—	—	—	—
2020–21	Lausanne HC	NL	51	23	17	40	34	6	1	0	1	4
2021–22	Lausanne HC	NL	51	13	15	28	24	8	2	3	5	8
2022–23	HC Fribourg-Gottéron	NL	52	17	16	33	18	2	0	1	1	0
2023–24	HC Fribourg-Gottéron	NL	52	18	22	40	38	12	2	3	5	8
2024–25	HC Fribourg-Gottéron	NL	52	11	14	25	32	14	1	4	5	8
NL totals			511	145	154	299	270	98	13	19	32	54
NHL totals			9	0	1	1	8	—	—	—	—	—

=== International ===
Year	Team	Event	Result	GP	G	A	Pts	PIM
2011	Switzerland	U18	7th	6	1	0	1	12
2011	Switzerland	IH18	7th	4	1	0	1	2
2012	Switzerland	WJC	8th	6	2	2	4	4
2013	Switzerland	WJC	6th	6	3	2	5	8
2019	Switzerland	WC	8th	8	0	2	2	6
2021	Switzerland	WC	6th	8	3	4	7	4
2022	Switzerland	OG	8th	5	0	0	0	2
2022	Switzerland	WC	5th	8	0	2	2	8
2023	Switzerland	WC	5th	7	1	2	3	0
2024	Switzerland	WC	2nd place, silver medalist(s)	10	4	0	4	4
2025	Switzerland	WC	2nd place, silver medalist(s)	10	1	2	3	8
2026	Switzerland	OG	5th	5	0	0	0	2
2026	Switzerland	WC	2nd place, silver medalist(s)	10	3	0	3	2
Junior totals				22	7	4	11	26
Senior totals				71	12	12	24	36
