= Ondřej Beránek =

Czech ice hockey player

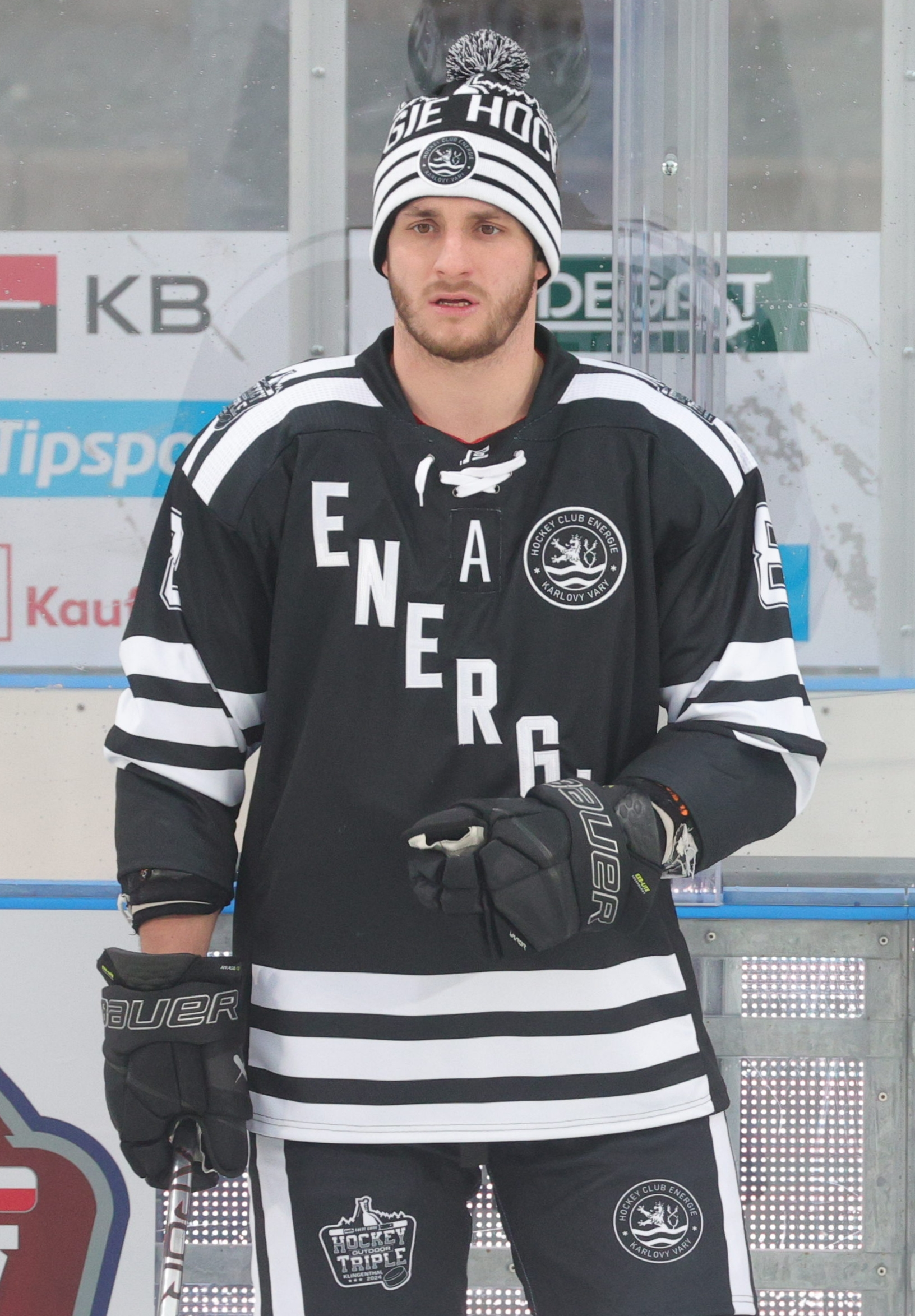
- Beránek in 2024
- Born: 21 December 1995 (age 30) Havlíčkův Brod, Czech Republic
- Height: 6 ft 0 in (183 cm)
- Weight: 192 lb (87 kg; 13 st 10 lb)
- Position: Left wing
- Shoots: Left
- ELH team: HC Karlovy Vary
- National team: Czech Republic
- Playing career: 2014–present

Ondřej Beránek (born 21 December 1995) is a Czech professional ice hockey player who is a left winger for HC Karlovy Vary of the Czech Extraliga.

== Career ==
Beránek made his Czech Extraliga debut with Karlovy Vary during the 2013–14 season and has played 120 games for the team up to the 2019–20 season. He has also played on loan with HC Dukla Jihlava, HC Baník Sokolov and SK Kadaň.

== International play ==
Medal record

Representing Czech Republic

Ice hockey

World Championships
Gold medal – first place	2024 Czechia	

Beránek represented Czechia at the 2024 IIHF World Championship and won a gold medal.

== Career statistics ==
=== International ===
Year	Team	Event	Result	GP	G	A	Pts	PIM
2023	Czech Republic	WC	8th	7	0	1	1	0
2024	Czechia	WC	1st place, gold medalist(s)	10	1	0	1	2
2025	Czechia	WC	6th	8	1	3	4	0
2026	Czechia	WC	5th	8	0	1	1	2
Senior totals				33	2	5	7	4
