= Mikael Ruohomaa =

Finnish ice hockey player (born 1988)

- Born: 17 November 1988 (age 37) Alastaro, Finland
- Height: 185 cm (6 ft 1 in)
- Weight: 82 kg (181 lb; 12 st 13 lb)
- Position: Centre
- Shoots: Left
- Liiga team Former teams: Lukko; JYP Jyväskylä; KalPa; Oulun Kärpät; Neftekhimik Nizhnekamsk; Sibir Novosibirsk; Leksands IF; MoDo Hockey; Frölunda HC
- National team: Finland
- Playing career: 2009–present

Medal record

Representing Finland

Ice hockey

World Championships
Silver medal – second place	2021 Latvia	

Mikael Ruohomaa (born 17 November 1988) is a Finnish professional ice hockey player. He is currently playing for Lukko of the Liiga.

== Playing career ==
Ruohomaa made his SM-liiga debut playing with JYP Jyväskylä during the 2012–13 SM-liiga season.

On May 1, 2018, Ruohomaa left Finland for the first time in his professional career, signing as a free agent to a one-year contract with Russian outfit, HC Neftekhimik Nizhnekamsk of the KHL.

After notching 33 points in 49 games in his debut 2018–19 season in the KHL with Neftekhimik Nizhnekamsk, Ruohomaa opted to continue in Russia, signing an improved one-year contract with HC Sibir Novosibirsk on May 1, 2019.

Ruohomaa left the KHL following his second season with Sibir Novosibirsk in 2020–21 and signed a two-year contract with Swedish SHL club, Leksands IF, on 15 July 2021.

== Career statistics ==
=== International ===
Year	Team	Event	Result	GP	G	A	Pts	PIM
2021	Finland	WC	2nd place, silver medalist(s)	9	1	2	3	4
2025	Finland	WC	7th	4	0	0	0	2
Senior totals				13	1	2	3	6
