= Stéphane Charlin =

Swiss ice hockey player (born 2000)

- Born: 30 August 2000 (age 25) Geneva, Switzerland
- Height: 6 ft 3 in (191 cm)
- Weight: 185 lb (84 kg; 13 st 3 lb)
- Position: Goaltender
- Catches: Left
- NL team Former teams: Genève-Servette HC; SCL Tigers
- National team: Switzerland
- NHL draft: Undrafted
- Playing career: 2019–present

Stéphane Charlin (born 30 August 2000) is a Swiss professional ice hockey goaltender who is currently playing with Genève-Servette HC of the National League (NL). He previously played with the SCL Tigers.

== Playing career ==
Charlin won two consecutive Swiss championship titles with Genève-Servette HC U20 team in 2018 and 2019. Charlin started the 2019/20 season, his final junior season, with Geneva's U20 team for the third straight year. However, he was quickly loaned to Geneva's affiliate, HC Sierre of the Swiss League (SL) to make his professional debut. Charlin posted a 3.68 GAA with a .887 SVS% through 6 games when he was called up by Genève-Servette HC to replace injured backup, Gauthier Descloux.

On 26 November 2019, Charlin signed his first professional contract, agreeing to a two-year deal with Genève-Servette HC.

He unexpectedly made his National League (NL) debut on 29 November 2019 in a game against the ZSC Lions replacing Robert Mayer who had received a game misconduct for hitting Marcus Krüger with his blocker. Charlin went on to play 26 minutes, allowing no goal in a 2-1 win. Mayer's game misconduct resulted in an automatic one game suspension, forcing Charlin to make his first NL start the next day at home against SC Bern. Charlin saved 30 of Bern's 32 shots, posting a 93.75 SVS% in a 2-1 loss for his first NL complete game. Charlin started his second NL game on 22 February 2020 against HC Ambrì-Piotta in which he recorded his first NL shutout in a 1-0 win.

On 20 March 2020, it was announced that Charlin, along with teammate Jesse Tanner, would be loaned to HC La Chaux-de-Fonds in the Swiss League for the 2020-21 season.

On 3 February 2021, Charlin was signed to an early two-year contract extension by Servette initially through the end of the 2023–24 season. On 8 June 2021, it was announced that Charlin would be loaned to SC Langenthal of the SL to begin the 2021–22 season.

Charlin was loaned to the SCL Tigers for the 2022-23 season. On 10 January 2023, Charlin agreed to a two-year contract with the Tigers, starting with the 2023-24 season.

On 17 October 2024, Charlin agreed to a three-year contract with Servette to return to Geneva starting with the 2025-26 season.

== International play ==
Medal record

Representing Switzerland

Ice hockey

World Championships
Silver medal – second place	2025 Sweden/Denmark	

Charlin was named to Switzerland's U20 U18 national team for the 2020 World Junior Championships in the Czech Republic. He entered the tournament as Luca Hollenstein's went on to win his only start against the Finns. He came on as a replacement to Hollenstein in the 30th minute against Sweden, posting a .938 SV% and a 1.98 GAA in 2 games.
