= 2026 Sweden Hockey Games =

2026 Beijer Hockey Games (Euro Hockey Tour)
Tournament details
- Host country: Sweden
- City: Ängelholm
- Venue: 1 (in 1 host city)
- Dates: 7–10 May 2026
- Teams: 4

Final positions
- Champions: Finland (10th title)
- Runners-up: Switzerland
- Third place: Czech Republic
- Fourth place: Sweden

Tournament statistics
- Games played: 6
- Goals scored: 34 (5.67 per game)
- Attendance: 20,665 (3,444 per game)
- Scoring leader: (Finland) Lenni Hämeenaho (5 points)

Official website
- swehockey

The 2026 Beijer Hockey Games were played from 7 to 10 May 2026. The Czech Republic, Finland, Sweden and Switzerland played a round-robin for a total of three games per team and six games in total. All the games were played in Ängelholm, Sweden in Catena Arena. Finland won the tournament. The tournament is part of 2025–26 Euro Hockey Tour.

== Standings ==
Pos	Team	Pld	W	OTW	OTL	L	GF	GA	GD	Pts
1	Finland	3	2	0	1	0	12	8	+4	7
2	Switzerland	3	1	1	0	1	11	8	+3	5
3	Czech Republic	3	1	0	0	2	6	10	−4	3
4	Sweden	3	1	0	0	2	5	8	−3	3

Updated to match(es) played on 10 May 2026. Source: swehockey

== Games ==
All times are local. Ängelholm – (Central European Summer Time)

7 May 2025; 15:00	Finland	4-5 GWS (0–1, 2–2, 2–1) (OT: 0–0) (SO: 0–1)	Switzerland	Catena Arena, Ängelholm; Attendance: 447

Game reference

Justus Annunen
Goalies
Leonardo Genoni
Referees:
(Czech Republic) Luděk Pilný
(Czech Republic) Adam Kika
Linesmen:
(Sweden) Rasmus Strömberg
(Sweden) Philip Hanning

	0-1	01:38 – Egli (Thürkauf, Frick)
	0-2	27:45 – Rochette (Suter, Egli)
Puljujärvi (Lundell, Manninen) (SHG) – 27:57	1-2
Saarijärvi (Lundell, Puljujärvi) – 32:29	2-2
	2-3	38:52 – Rochette (Malgin, Chanton)
Mäenalanen (Kukkonen, Merelä) – 46:24	3-3
	3-4	49:16 – Thürkauf (Moy, Niederreiter)
Puljujärvi (Lundell, Heinola) (PP) – 51:25	4-4

Lundell (miss)
Puljujärvi (miss)
Barkov
Räty (miss)
Kuokkanen (miss)
Shootout
(miss) Malgin
Rochette
Moy
(miss) Josi
(miss) Meier
6 min
Penalties
10 min
27
Shots
18

7 May 2025; 19:00	Czech Republic	3-1 (1–0, 1–0, 1–1)	Sweden	Catena Arena, Ängelholm; Attendance: 5,127

Game reference

Dominik Pavlát
Goalies
Arvid Söderblom
Referees:
(Finland) Kristian Vikman
(Finland) Janne Wuorenheimo
Linesmen:
(Sweden) Ludvig Lundgren
(Sweden) Andréas Svensson

Kovařčík (Kaut) (PP) – 19:52	1-0
Reichel (Pavlík, Ticháček) – 34:58	2-0
	2-1	56:42 – Hägg
Kovařčík (ENG) – 58:01	3-1

16 min
Penalties
16 min
23
Shots
22

9 May 2025; 12:00	Finland	3-2 (2-0, 0-2, 1-0)	Czech Republic	Catena Arena, Ängelholm; Attendance: 1,576

Game reference

Harri Säteri
Goalies
Josef Kořenář
Referees:
(Sweden) Mikael Holm
(Sweden) David Laksola
Linesmen:
(Sweden) Ludvig Lundgren
(Sweden) Philip Hanning

Saarijärvi (Räty, Hämeenaho) - 04:44	1-0
Räty (Puhakka, Päivärinta) - 14:39	2-0
	2-1	29:54 - Kubalík (Tomášek, Hovorka)
	2-2	32:32 -Tomášek (Voženílek, Flek)
Lehtonen (PP) (Hämeenaho, Manninen) - 54:41	3-2

10 min
Penalties
12 min
18
Shots
22

9 May 2025; 16:00	Sweden	3-0 (1-0, 1-0, 1-0)	Switzerland	Catena Arena, Ängelholm; Attendance: 5674

Game reference

Magnus Hellberg
Goalies
Reto Berra
Referees:
(Finland) Kristian Vikman
(Finland) Janne Wuorenheimo
Linesmen:
(Sweden) Andréas Svensson
(Sweden) Rasmus Strömberg

Johansson (Karlsson, Ekman-Larsson) - 12:05	1-0
Johansson (Ekman-Larsson, Raymond) - 36:36	2-0
De La Rose - 59:41	3-0

8 min
Penalties
12 min
25
Shots
25

10 May 2025; 12:00	Switzerland	6-1 (2-0, 1-1, 3-0)	Czech Republic	Catena Arena, Ängelholm; Attendance: 1591

Game reference

Sandro Aeschlimann
Goalies
Petr Kváča
Referees:
(Sweden) Kristoffer Folkstrand
(Sweden) Alexander Österberg
Linesmen:
(Sweden) Philip Hanning
(Sweden) Rasmus Strömberg

Knak (Jäger, Riat) - 04:33	1-0
Suter (Andrighetto, Malgin) - 05:29	2-0
Biasca (Bertschy, Rochette) - 33:00	3-0
	3-1	36:00 - Mandát (Cibulka, Melovský) (PP)
Andrighetto (Malgin, Kukan) (PP) - 53:51	4-1
Malgin (Suter, Egli) (PP) - 54:55	5-1
Bertschy (Rochette) - 57:12	6-1

6 min
Penalties
12 min
27
Shots
20

10 May 2025; 16:00	Sweden	1-5 (1-2, 0-2, 0-1)	Finland	Catena Arena, Ängelholm; Attendance: 6250

Game reference

Arvid Söderblom
Goalies
Justus Annunen
Referees:
(Austria) Mark Lemelin
(Switzerland) Loïc Ruprecht
Linesmen:
(Sweden) Ludvig Lundgren
(Sweden) Andréas Svensson

	0-1	00:38 - Heinola (Barkov, Vaakanainen)
Brännström (Öhgren) - 07:39	1-1
	1-2	18:47 - Puistola (Hämeenaho, Heinola)
	1-3	28:28 - Puistola (Hämeenaho, Räty)
	1-4	38:16 - Hämeenaho (Puistola, Kuokkanen) (PP)
	1-5	43:20 - Päkkilä (Mäenalanen, Päivärinta)

20 min
Penalties
24 min
13
Shots
19

== Scoring leaders ==
Pos	Player	Country	GP	G	A	Pts	+/−	PIM	POS
1	Lenni Hämeenaho	Finland	3	1	4	5	-1	0	F
2	Théo Rochette	Switzerland	3	2	2	4	+4	0	F
3	Denis Malgin	Switzerland	2	1	3	4	+3	0	F
4	Patrik Puistola	Finland	3	2	1	3	-1	0	F
5	Jesse Puljujärvi	Finland	3	2	1	3	+1	2	F

GP = Games played; G = Goals; A = Assists; Pts = Points; +/− = Plus/minus; PIM = Penalties in minutes; POS = Position
Source: swehockey

== Goaltending leaders ==
Pos	Player	Country	TOI	GA	GAA	Sv%	SO
1	Justus Annunen	Finland	124:27	5	2.41	83.33	0
2	Arvid Söderblom	Sweden	118:10	7	3.55	82.93	0

TOI = Time on ice (minutes:seconds); SA = Shots against; GA = Goals against; GAA = Goals Against Average; Sv% = Save percentage; SO = Shutouts
Source: swehockey
