= 2025 Swiss Ice Hockey Games =

2025 Swiss Ice Hockey Games (Euro Hockey Games)
Tournament details
- Host countries: Switzerland; Czechia
- Cities: Zürich; Liberec
- Venues: 2 (in 2 host cities)
- Dates: 11–14 December 2025
- Teams: 4

Final positions
- Champions: Sweden (3rd title)
- Runners-up: Czech Republic
- Third place: Finland
- Fourth place: Switzerland

Tournament statistics
- Games played: 6
- Goals scored: 35 (5.83 per game)
- Attendance: 35,864 (5,977 per game)
- Scoring leader: (Switzerland) Damien Riat (5 points)

The 2025 Swiss Ice Hockey Games was played between 11 and 14 December 2025. The Czech Republic, Finland, Sweden and Switzerland played a round-robin for a total of three games per team and six games in total. Five of the games were played in Zürich, Switzerland and one game in Liberec, Czech Republic. The tournament was won by Sweden. The tournament was a part of the 2025–26 Euro Hockey Tour.

== Standings ==
Pos	Team	Pld	W	OTW	OTL	L	GF	GA	GD	Pts
1	Sweden	3	2	1	0	0	12	4	+8	8
2	Czech Republic	3	2	0	0	1	8	9	−1	6
3	Finland	3	0	1	0	2	7	10	−3	2
4	Switzerland	3	0	0	2	1	8	12	−4	2

Source: eurohockey

== Games ==
All times are local. Zürich – (Central European Time – UTC+1) Liberec – (Central European Time – UTC+1)

11 December 2025; 18:30	Czech Republic	3-1 (0-0, 1-0, 2-1)	Finland	Home Credit Arena, Liberec; Attendance: 7,088

Game reference

Dominik Pavlát
Goalies
Emil Larmi
Referees:
(Sweden) Andreas Harnebring
(Sweden) Christoffer Holm

26:44 – Roman Cervenka (Filip Chlapík, Marian Adámek)	1-0
42:06 – Ondřej Kaše (Lukas Sedlak, Roman Cervenka) (PP)	2-0
	2-1	46:52 – Robin Salo (Jere Sallinen, Hannes Björninen)
59:57 – Lukáš Rousek (EN)	3-1

6 min
Penalties
28 min
15
Shots
25

11 December 2025; 19:45	Sweden	3-2 GWS (1–2, 0–0, 1–0) (0–0) (1–0)	Switzerland	Swiss Life Arena, Zürich; Attendance: 5,042

Game reference

Lars Johansson
Goalies
Leonardo Genoni
Referees:
(Czech Republic) Jakub Zeliska
(Czech Republic) Luděk Pilný

	0-1	00:01 – Tyler Moy (Damien Riat) (PP)
04:51 – Pär Lindholm (Isac Hedqvist)	1-1
	1-2	41:21 – André Petersson (Tim Heed)
11:25 – Damien Riat (Denis Malgin, Dean Kukan) (PP)	2-2

Hugg
Petersson (miss)
Nilsson
Shootout
(miss) Rochette
(miss) Riat
10 min
Penalties
27 min
30
Shots
28

13 December 2025; 14:00	Finland	2-4 (1-1, 0-1, 1-2)	Sweden	Swiss Life Arena, Zürich; Attendance: 6,445

Game reference

Waltteri Ignatjew
Goalies
Arvid Holm
Referees:
(Switzerland) Cedric Borga
(Switzerland) Roland Gerber

09:19 – Mikko Lehtonen (Patrik Puistola) (PP)	1-0
	1-1	15:10 – Erik Brännström (Dennis Rasmussen, Christoffer Ehn)
	1-2	35:24 – Lukas Bengtsson (Dennis Rasmussen) (SHG)
	1-3	58:28 – Max Friberg (Isac Hedqvist) (EN)
59:51 – Mikko Lehtonen (Jesse Puljujärvi)	2-3
	2-4	59:58 – Marcus Sörensen (EN)

2 min
Penalties
8 min
21
Shots
21

13 December 2025; 18:00	Switzerland	3-5 (1-1, 1-1 , 1-3)	Czech Republic	Swiss Life Arena, Zürich; Attendance: 6,445

Game reference

Leonardo Genoni
Goalies
Dominik Pavlát
Referees:
(Finland) Joonas Kova
(Finland) Janne Wuorenheimo

	0-1	11:45 – Filip Chlapík
14:34 – Calvin Thürkauf (Damien Riat)	1-1
	1-2	24:14 – Michael Spacek (Daniel Gazda)
34:23 – Dario Simion (Sven Andrighetto) (PP)	2-2
	2-3	48:05 – Daniel Voženílek
49:03 – Calvin Thürkauf (Damien Riat)	3-3
	3-4	55:02 – Filip Chlapík
	3-5	58:50 – Ondřej Beránek (EN)

4 min
Penalties
4 min
32
Shots
20

14 December 2025; 11:45	Czech Republic	0-5 (0-1, 0-0, 0-4)	Sweden	Swiss Life Arena, Zürich; Attendance: 5,422

Game reference

Petr Kváča
Goalies
Lars Johansson
Referees:
(Switzerland) Micha Hebeisen
(Switzerland) Philip Ströbel

0-1	08:27 – Marcus Sörensen (Erik Brännström) (PP)
0-2	41:21 – André Petersson (Isac Hedqvist, Pär Lindholm)
0-3	47:50 – Rickard Hugg (Max Friberg)
0-4	57:02 – Pär Lindholm (Felix Nilsson) (PP)
0-5	57:32 – Dennis Rasmussen (Marcus Sylvegård)

4 min
Penalties
6 min
19
Shots
30

14 December 2025; 15:45	Switzerland	3-4 OT (1-2, 1-1, 1-0) (OT: 0–1)	Finland	Swiss Life Arena, Zürich; Attendance: 5,422

Game reference

Stéphane Charlin
Goalies
Emil Larmi
Referees:
(Czech Republic) Jakub Zeliska
(Czech Republic) Ludek Pilny

	0-1	04:21 – Jesse Puljujärvi (Henrik Borgström)
07:01 – Sven Andrighetto (Dominik Egli, Dario Simion) (PP)	1-1
	1-2	19:51 – Markus Nurmi (Julius Nättinen, Vili Saarijärvi) (PP)
	1-3	26:40 – Sami Niku (Janne Kuokkanen) (PP)
39:53 – Dario Simion (Damien Riat, Dominik Egli) (PP)	2-3
57:46 – Gaëtan Haas (Dean Kukan)	3-3
	3-4	60:58 – Jesse Puljujärvi

29 min
Penalties
10 min
37
Shots
23

== Scoring leaders ==
Pos	Player	Country	GP	G	A	Pts	+/−	PIM	POS
1	Damien Riat	Switzerland	3	1	4	5	-1	0	F
2	Pär Lindholm	Sweden	3	2	1	3	+5	2	F
3	Mikko Lehtonen	Finland	3	2	1	3	-1	22	D
4	Dario Simion	Switzerland	3	2	1	3	0	0	F
5	Jesse Puljujärvi	Finland	3	2	1	3	-2	4	F

GP = Games played; G = Goals; A = Assists; Pts = Points; +/− = Plus/minus; PIM = Penalties in minutes; POS = Position
Source: quanthockey

== Goaltending leaders ==
Pos	Player	Country	TOI	GA	GAA	Sv%	SO
1	Lars Johansson	Sweden	125:00	2	0.96	95.65	1
2	Dominik Pavlát	Czech Republic	120:00	4	2.00	93.22	0
3	Emil Larmi	Finland	119:40	5	2.51	90.74	0
4	Leonardo Genoni	Switzerland	124:04	6	2.90	88.00	0

TOI = Time on ice (minutes:seconds); SA = Shots against; GA = Goals against; GAA = Goals Against Average; Sv% = Save percentage; SO = Shutouts
Source: Swiss Ice Hockey
