= 2025 Karjala Tournament =

2025 Suomen EHT-turnaus (Euro Hockey Games)
Tournament details
- Host countries: Finland; Sweden
- Cities: Tampere; Ängelholm
- Venues: 2 (in 2 host cities)
- Dates: 6–9 November 2025
- Teams: 4

Final positions
- Champions: Sweden (7th title)
- Runners-up: Czech Republic
- Third place: Finland
- Fourth place: Switzerland

Tournament statistics
- Games played: 6
- Goals scored: 35 (5.83 per game)
- Attendance: 37,843 (6,307 per game)
- Scoring leader: (Sweden) Jesper Frödén (6 points)

Official website
- leijonat.com

The 2025 Suomen EHT-turnaus was played between 6 and 9 November 2025. The Czech Republic, Finland, Sweden and Switzerland played a round-robin for a total of three games per team and six games in total. One game was played in Catena Arena, Ängelholm, Sweden (Sweden vs Czechia) all the other games were played in Nokia Arena, Tampere. Sweden won the tournament. The tournament was part of 2025–26 Euro Hockey Tour.

== Standings ==
Pos	Team	Pld	W	OTW	OTL	L	GF	GA	GD	Pts
1	Sweden	3	3	0	0	0	15	6	+9	9
2	Czech Republic	3	1	0	0	2	7	7	0	3
3	Finland	3	1	0	0	2	7	9	−2	3
4	Switzerland	3	1	0	0	2	6	13	−7	3

Source: eurohockey

== Games ==
All times are local. Helsinki – (Eastern European Time – UTC+2) Ängelholm – (Central European Time – UTC+1)

6 November 2025; 18:30	Switzerland	3-1 (0-0, 0-0, 3-1)	Finland	Nokia Arena, Tampere; Attendance: 8,146

Game reference

Reto Berra
Goalies
Harri Säteri
Referees:
(Sweden) Richard Magnusson
(Sweden) Alexander Österberg

47:46 – Ken Jäger (Fabrice Herzog, Giancarlo Chanton)	1-0
51:03 – Attilio Biasca (Nicolas Baechler, Michael Fora)	2-0
	2-1	57:05 – Jere Innala (Mikko Lehtonen, Toni Rajala) (PP/EN)
59:36 – Christoph Bertschy (EN)	3-1

4 min
Penalties
2 min
18
Shots
17

6 November 2025; 19:00	Sweden	3-1 (0-0, 1-0, 2-1)	Czech Republic	Catena Arena, Ängelholm; Attendance: 5,027

Game reference

Arvid Holm
Goalies
Josef Korenár
Referees:
(Switzerland) Cedric Borga
(Switzerland) Micha Hebeisen
Linesmen:
(Sweden) Ludvig Lundgren
(Sweden) Anders Nyqvist

33:22 – Simon Ryfors (Jacob Larsson, Christoffer Ehn)	1-0
41:29 – Marcus Sylvegård (Tim Heed, Simon Ryfors) (PP)	2-0
	2-1	44:44 – Jakub Lauko
55:57 – Erik Brännström	3-1

6 min
Penalties
10 min
22
Shots
23

8 November 2025; 13:00	Sweden	8-3 (2-1, 4-1, 2-1)	Switzerland	Nokia Arena, Tampere; Attendance: 1,731

Game reference

Jacob Johansson
Goalies
Sandro Aeschlimann
Referees:
(Finland) Joonas Kova
(Finland) Kristian Vikman

	0-1	05:57 – Sven Jung (Justin Sigrist) (PP)
10:48 – Jacob de la Rose (Erik Brännström, Jesper Frödén) (PP)	1-1
15:52 – Fredrik Olofsson (Jacob de la Rose, Jesper Frödén) (PP)	2-1
	2-2	21:41 – Sandro Schmid (Tino Kessler, Dario Rohrbach)
26:51 – Linus Johansson (Andreas Wingerli)	3-2
30:12 – Erik Brännström (Linus Johansson, Jacob Larsson)	4-2
31:50 – Isac Hedqvist (Rasmus Asplund)	5-2
39:58 – Jesper Frödén (Erik Brännström)	6-2
	6-3	55:28 – Simon Knak (Christoph Bertschy, Nico Gross)
56:14 – Jesper Frödén (Fredrik Olofsson, Tim Heed) (EN)	7-3
59:19 – Simon Ryfors (Jesper Frödén, Fredrik Olofsson)	8-3

4 min
Penalties
4 min
23
Shots
18

8 November 2025; 17:00	Finland	4-2 (1-0, 2-0, 1-2)	Czech Republic	Nokia Arena, Tampere; Attendance: 10,149

Game reference

Emil Larmi
Goalies
Petr Kváča
Referees:
(Russia)
(Russia)
Linesmen:
(Sweden)
(Sweden)

01:28 – Arttu Ruotsalainen (Santeri Hatakka, Jere Innala)	1-0
26:28 – Leevi Tukiainen (Arttu Ruotsalainen, Jere Innala)	2-0
37:19 – Sakari Manninen (Jesse Puljujärvi, Mikko Lehtonen)	3-0
	3-1	45:50 – Dominik Kubalík (Lukas Sedlak, Libor Zábranský)
	3-2	58:32 – Radim Zohorna (Matej Stransky, Radim Šimek)
59:55 – Jere Innala (EN)	4-2

6 min
Penalties
4 min
22
Shots
27

9 November 2025; 13:00	Czech Republic	4-0 (2-0, 2-0, 0-0)	Switzerland	Nokia Arena, Tampere; Attendance: 1,933

Game reference

Josef Kořenář
Goalies
~~Reto Berra~~
Sandro Aeschlimann
Referees:
(Finland) Riku Brander
(Finland) Janne Wuorenheimo

05:46 – Filip Chlapík (Kristian Reichel, Matyáš Kantner)	1-0
23:35 – CZEMatej Stransky (Jan Kostalek, Dominik Kubalík) (PP)	2-0
23:45 – Filip Chlapík (Jan Kostalek, Radim Šimek)	3-0
27:13 – Marian Adámek (Filip Chlapík, Jachym Kondelik)	4-0

2 min
Penalties
29 min
25
Shots
13

9 November 2025; 17:00	Finland	2-4 (1-2, 1-0, 0-2)	Sweden	Nokia Arena, Tampere; Attendance: 10,857

Game reference

Emil Larmi
Goalies
Arvid Holm
Referees:
(Czech Republic) Tomas Mejzlik
(Czech Republic) Jiri Ondracek

	0-1	05:58 – Jesper Frödén (Jacob de la Rose, Rasmus Asplund)
	0-2	13:07 – Marcus Sörensen
19:39 – Toni Rajala (Sami Vatanen, Santeri Hatakka) (PP)	1-2
30:40 – Rasmus Rissanen (Oskari Laaksonen, Eemil Erholtz)	2-2
	2-3	44:37 – Rasmus Asplund (Isac Hedqvist, Erik Brännström)
	2-4	58:37 – Fredrik Olofsson (Simon Ryfors) (EN)

4 min
Penalties
0 min
28
Shots
24

== Scoring leaders ==
Pos	Player	Country	GP	G	A	Pts	+/−	PIM	POS
1	Jesper Frödén	Sweden	3	3	3	6	+4	0	F
2	Erik Brännström	Sweden	3	2	3	5	+8	2	D
3	Fredrik Olofsson	Sweden	3	2	2	4	+2	2	F
4	Simon Ryfors	Sweden	3	2	2	4	+3	0	F
5	Jere Innala	Finland	3	2	2	4	+1	0	F

GP = Games played; G = Goals; A = Assists; Pts = Points; +/− = Plus/minus; PIM = Penalties in minutes; POS = Position
Source: quanthockey
