= Adamek (surname) =

Adamek (Czech feminine Adamková) is a Slavic surname, a diminutive for the given name Adam. Archaic feminine forms of the Polish surname: Adamkowa (by husband) and Adamkówna (by father). They are still used colloquially. Still another colloquial feminine form: Adamczycha. Notable people with the surname include:

- Andrzej Adamek (born 1972), Polish basketball player and coach
- Donna Adamek (born 1957), American tenpin bowler
- Jana Adámková (born 1978), Czech football referee
- Józef Adamek (1900–1974), Polish footballer
- Karl Adamek (1910–2000), Austrian footballer and manager
- Kayla Adamek (born 1995), Polish footballer
- Klaudia Adamek (born 1999), Polish athlete
- Marian Adámek (born 1997), Czech ice hockey defenceman
- Mark Adamek (born 1982), American professional ice hockey defenceman
- Mieczysław Adamek (1918–1944), Polish fighter ace of the Polish Air Force in World War II
- Miroslav Adámek (1957–2002), Czech painter, graphic artist and illustrator
- Tomasz Adamek (born 1976), Polish professional heavyweight boxer

== See also ==
- Adamec, spelling variation
- Adamiec, Polish equivalent of Adamec
- Petra Tichá-Adámková
