= Adamčík =

Adamčík (feminine: Adamčíková) is a Czech and Slovak surname, a diminutive of Adam and Adamec. Notable people with the surname include:

- Mário Adamčík (born 1973), Slovak footballer
- Torey Adamcik (born 1990), American convicted murderer

== See also ==
- Hadamczik
