= Adametz =

Adametz is a Germanized version of the Czech and Slovak surname Adamec, or less commonly, Polish Adamiec. Notable people with the surname include:

- Hans Adametz (1896–1966), Austrian ceramist and sculptor
- Jan Franciszek Adametz
- Leopold Adametz (1861–1941), Czech-born Austrian zoologist
