= 2025–26 Euro Hockey Tour =

Tournament details
- Venues: 6 (in 6 host cities)
- Dates: 7 November 2025 – 10 May 2026
- Teams: 4

Final positions
- Champions: Sweden (8th title)
- Runners-up: Czech Republic
- Third place: Finland
- Fourth place: Switzerland

Tournament statistics
- Games played: 24
- Goals scored: 138 (5.75 per game)
- Attendance: 122,193 (5,091 per game)
- Scoring leader: (Sweden) Erik Brännström (12 points)

The 2025–26 Euro Hockey Tour was the 30th season of Euro Hockey Tour. It started in November 2025 and lasted until May 2026. It consisted of Karjala Tournament, Swiss Ice Hockey Games, Beijer Hockey Games and Czech Hockey Games.

== Standings ==
Pos	Team	Pld	W	OTW	OTL	L	GF	GA	GD	Pts
1	Sweden	12	9	1	0	2	47	23	+24	29
2	Czech Republic	12	5	0	1	6	26	33	−7	16
3	Finland	12	4	1	1	6	35	36	−1	15
4	Switzerland	12	2	2	2	6	30	46	−16	12

Source: Euro Hockey Tour

== Karjala Tournament ==
The Karjala Tournament was played between 6–9 November 2025. Five matches were played in Tampere, Finland, and one game in Ängelholm, Sweden (Sweden vs Czech Republic). Tournament was won by Sweden.

Pos	Team	Pld	W	OTW	OTL	L	GF	GA	GD	Pts
1	Sweden	3	3	0	0	0	15	6	+9	9
2	Czech Republic	3	1	0	0	2	7	7	0	3
3	Finland	3	1	0	0	2	7	9	−2	3
4	Switzerland	3	1	0	0	2	6	13	−7	3

Source: Leijonat.com

6 November 2025
Switzerland	3–1	Finland
Sweden	3–1	Czech Republic
8 November 2025
Sweden	8–3	Switzerland
Finland	4–2	Czech Republic
9 November 2025
Czech Republic	4–0	Switzerland
Finland	2–4	Sweden

== SWISS Ice Hockey Games ==
The 2025 Swiss Ice Hockey Games was played between 11–14 December 2025. Five matches were played in Swiss Life Arena in Zurich, Switzerland, and one game in Home Credit Arena in Liberec, Czech Republic (Czech Republic vs Finland).

Pos	Team	Pld	W	OTW	OTL	L	GF	GA	GD	Pts
1	Sweden	3	2	1	0	0	12	4	+8	8
2	Czech Republic	3	2	0	0	1	8	9	−1	6
3	Finland	3	0	1	0	2	7	10	−3	2
4	Switzerland	3	0	0	2	1	8	12	−4	2

Source: eurohockey

11 December 2025
Sweden	3–2 (GWS)	Switzerland
Czech Republic	3–1	Finland
13 December 2025
Switzerland	3–5	Czech Republic
Finland	2–4	Sweden
14 December 2025
Czech Republic	0–5	Sweden
Switzerland	3–4 (OT)	Finland

== Czech Hockey Games ==
The 2026 Czech Hockey Games was played between 30 April–3 May 2026. Five of the games were played in České Budějovice, Czech Republic and one game in Kloten, Switzerland.

Pos	Team	Pld	W	OTW	OTL	L	GF	GA	GD	Pts
1	Sweden	3	3	0	0	0	15	5	+10	9
2	Czech Republic	3	1	0	1	1	5	7	−2	4
3	Finland	3	1	0	0	2	9	9	0	3
4	Switzerland	3	0	1	0	2	4	13	−9	2

Source: eurohockey.com

30 April 2026
Czech Republic	3-2	Finland
Switzerland	1-8	Sweden
2 May 2026
Switzerland	3-5	Finland
Czech Republic	2-4	Sweden
3 May 2026
Sweden	3-2	Finland
Czech Republic	0-1 (GWS)	Switzerland

== Beijer Hockey Games ==
The 2026 Beijer Hockey Games was played between 7–10 May 2026. All matches were played in Catena Arena in Ängelholm, Sweden.

Pos	Team	Pld	W	OTW	OTL	L	GF	GA	GD	Pts
1	Finland	3	2	0	1	0	12	8	+4	7
2	Switzerland	3	1	1	0	1	11	8	+3	5
3	Czech Republic	3	1	0	0	2	6	10	−4	3
4	Sweden	3	1	0	0	2	5	8	−3	3

Source: swehockey.se

7 May 2026
Finland	4-5 (GWS)	Switzerland
Czech Republic	3-1	Sweden
9 May 2026
Finland	3-2	Czech Republic
Sweden	3-0	Switzerland
10 May 2026
Switzerland	6-1	Czech Republic
Sweden	1-5	Finland
