= Adamec =

Adamec (feminine: Adamcová) is a Czech and Slovak surname. It comes from the given name Adam. The Polish counterpart is Adamiec and the Germanized form of the surname is Adametz. Notable people with the surname include:

- Austin Adamec (born 1988), American musician
- Jiří Adamec (born 1982), Czech footballer
- Joseph Victor Adamec (1935–2019), American Roman Catholic bishop
- Jozef Adamec (1942–2018), Slovak footballer
- Ladislav Adamec (1926–2007), Czech politician, prime minister of Czechoslovakia
- Luboš Adamec (1959–2025), Czech sport shooter
- Luboš Adamec (footballer) (born 1994), Czech footballer
- Ludwig W. Adamec (1924–2019), American academic and historian
- Martina Adamcová (born 1966), Czech-Canadian film producer, screenwriter and actress
- Petr Adamec (born 1960), Czech swimmer
- Quido Adamec (1924–2007), Czech ice hockey referee
- Zdeněk Adamec (born 1956), Czech javelin thrower
