= Austin & Lindsey Adamec =

American musical group

- Also known as: A&LA
- Origin: Jacksonville, Florida
- Genres: Worship; folk; Christian pop; Christian rock; Christian alternative rock; folk pop; folk rock; indie folk; indie rock
- Years active: 2016–present
- Labels: Radiate, Integrity Music
- Members: Austin Adamec; Lindsey Adamec
- Website: austinandlindseyadamec.com

Austin & Lindsey Adamec, also known as A&LA, are an American Christian music husband-and-wife modern worship duo from Jacksonville, Florida. They started their music recording career in 2016. Their first extended play record, Austin & Lindsey Adamec, was released in 2016 by Radiate Music.

== Background ==
The duo met while Austin Adamec was touring around Jacksonville, Florida, performing music at local churches and coffee-houses. Austin Adamec was pursuing a solo music career with Reunion Records, before coming together with his wife in 2016 to form the duo. She was a member of the contemporary Christian music pop group 1 Girl Nation until leaving in 2014.

== Music history ==
The husband and wife duo commenced their music recording career together in 2016, with the extended play record Austin & Lindsey Adamec, released on March 25, 2016, by Radiate Music, a label operated and owned by Ian Eskelin.

== Members ==
- Austin Mark Adamec (born March 21, 1988)
- Lindsey Brooke Adamec (née Ciresi) (born October 27, 1992)

== Discography ==
=== EPs ===
- Austin & Lindsey Adamec (March 25, 2016, Radiate)

=== Singles ===
Year	Single	Christian Airplay
2016	Walk on Waves	48
2017	Welcome to the World You Made	41
2018	Victorious	—
2018	Streams	
2018	Consuming Fire	
2020	As For Me & My House	
2020	This Is Where I Belong	
2020	You Keep Your Word	

=== Albums ===
Year	Single	Christian Airplay
2020	Sound Of The House	-
