= Hadamczik =

Hadamczik (feminine: Hadamcziková) is a surname, a Germanised form of Adamčík. Notable people with the surname include:

- Alois Hadamczik (born 1952), Czech ice hockey coach
- Evžen Hadamczik (1939–1984), Czech football player and manager
