= Unite (1GN album) =

- From left to right: Robinson, Bach, and Justice

Studio album by 1GN
- Released: April 15, 2016
- Genre: Christian EDM; Christian pop; Christian hip hop; worship; electropop; power pop; pop rock
- Length: 30:46
- Label: Reunion

1GN chronology
1 Girl Nation (2013)	Unite (2016)

Unite is the second and final studio album from 1GN. Reunion Records released the album on April 15, 2016.

== Background ==
This is their second album, but first as a trio, after losing two members to attrition, making the process to record and complete this album take two years.

== Critical reception ==
Professional ratings
Review scores
Source	Rating
365 Days of Inspiring Media	4/5 stars
CCM Magazine	3.5/5 stars
The Christian Beat	4/5 stars
Jesus Wired	97/100
Jesus Freak Hideout	4/5 stars
New Release Today	4/5 stars
Today's Christian Entertainment	3.7/5 stars

Andy Argyrakis, allotting the album a three and a half stars for CCM Magazine, says, "this is still a solid effort from a revamped act poised to make a positive splash." Awarding the album four stars from New Release Today, Kaitlyn Gosnell states, "Unite is definitely 1GN's breakout album. Exploring topics today's preteen and teenage girls deal with and encouraging in fresh new ways, this album will certainly change many lives." Madeleine Dittmer, giving the album four stars at The Christian Beat, writes, "Trio 1GN has created a collection of songs that are upbeat, uplifting, and unifying." Rating the album 3.7 stars for Today's Christian Beat, Laura Chambers says, "1GN has crafted an album that, while not ground-breaking, delivers positive, counter-cultural words of wisdom that, in time, have the power to effect change on a larger scale." Iain Moss, indicating in a 97 out of 100 review by Jesus Wired, describes, "Unite blows their debut release out of the water and is set to blow down the doors to a much wider audience for themselves as well." Signaling in a four star review at 365 Days of Inspiring Media, Jonathan Andre states, "[1GN] continue to wow us in these 10 songs, full of life, fervent honesty, musical experimentation, and the infusion of rap in practically every song." Alex Caldwell, allocating the album four stars from Jesus Freak Hideout, writes, "Unite does what a good second album in any genre should do", meaning "1GN has a sophomore album to be proud of."

== Track listing ==
No.	Title	Length
1.	"Get Hype"	3:16
2.	"The One"	3:05
3.	"Cinema"	3:00
4.	"Guard Your Heart"	3:22
5.	"#NoFilter"	3:04
6.	"Haters"	2:51
7.	"Panic"	3:12
8.	"Impossible"	2:56
9.	"Smile"	2:40
10.	"Unite"	3:20
Total length:		30:46

== Chart performance ==
Chart (2016)	Peak position
US Christian Albums (Billboard)	44
