= Tankový prapor =

- Film poster
- Directed by: Vít Olmer
- Story by: Josef Škvorecký
- Release date: 1991
- Running time: 83 minutes
- Country: Czechoslovakia
- Language: Czech
- Budget: 15 Million KČs
- Box office: 26 Million KČs

Tankový prapor (Tank Battalion) is a Czech comedy film. It was released in 1991. The movie represented the first privately produced movie in Czech Republic. It was a blockbuster. Today, the movie is perceived as a classic, it is the most acclaimed movie of his creator, director Vit Olmer, it starred Lukáš Vaculík, a popular star of youth movies in the main role, as well as the by-then well received comedian Miroslav Donutil.

The movie script is based on samizdat book by Škvorecký, inspired by his own experiences during military service.

Official distributor's text:

"The hero of this joyless, if predominantly amusing outlook on military life in the year 1953 is staff sergeant Danny Smiřický (with autobiographic traits of J. Škvorecký), encountering, along with his friends, the idiocy and "bossing around" of the officer corps. It follows Dany's love flick with the wife of one of the officers, Janinka Pinkasová, his memories of the unapproachable Prague girl, Lizetka, and mostly how he doggedly resists officer stupidity, accosting him from every direction."

The cast included many unknown actors and actresses; it established them as stars; among them Simona Chytrová, Michal Suchánek, Martina Adamcová, Ivana Velichová and Milan Šimáček.
