= Austin & Lindsey Adamec (EP) =

EP by Austin & Lindsey Adamec
- Released: March 25, 2016
- Genres: Worship; folk; Christian pop; Christian rock; Christian alternative rock; folk pop; folk rock; indie folk; indie rock
- Length: 22:21
- Label: Radiate
- Producer: Ian Eskelin

Austin & Lindsey Adamec is the first extended play by Austin & Lindsey Adamec. They released the EP on March 25, 2016. The duo worked with Ian Eskelin, in the production of this EP.

== Critical reception ==
Professional ratings
Review scores
Source	Rating
365 Days of Inspiring Media	4.5/5 stars
CCM Magazine	4/5 stars
The Christian Beat	4/5 stars
Jesus Freak Hideout	3.5/5 stars
Jesus Wired	97/100
New Release Today	3.5/5 stars
Today's Christian Entertainment	4/5 stars
Worship Leader	4/5 stars

Matt Conner, giving the EP four stars at CCM Magazine, states, "this [is a] moving set of songs." Awarding the EP three and a half stars from New Release Today, Mikayla Shriver writes, "Amidst all of the fantastic worship music being released in 2016, Austin and Lindsey Adamec's self-titled EP deserves a listen...or ten" Jonathan Andre, giving the EP four and a half stars at 365 Days of Inspiring Media, describes, "Well done to the duo for such an honest portrayal of worship music". Rating the EP a 97 out of 100 for Jesus Wired, Rebekah Joy states, "this worship EP is an incredible breath of fresh air for worship music. The incredibly rich, and pure vocals blend together in a way that is unique and hard to find these days. The honest and meaningful lyrics are simply beautiful songs of praise."

Allotting the EP four star review at Worship Leader, Amanda Furbeck states, "A&LA is comprised of five well-crafted original songs that tell the personal and spiritual victories of Austin and Lindsey." Jeremy Barnes, indicating in a three and a half star review by Jesus Freak Hideout, says, "At the end of the day, the strength of the combined vocals of these two talented musicians, and the dedication to the faithful delivery of a heartfelt testimony, validate a thoughtful and relevant release." Signaling in a four star review from Today's Christian Entertainment, Laura Chambers writes, "Their self-titled EP perfectly captures their decision to make their marriage a threefold cord, with Jesus ever in the brilliant center."

Ken Wiegman, reviewing the EP at Alpha Omega News, says, "Mostly because of the range of vocal possibilities; either in harmonies or switching leads. It is no different with Austin and Lindsey, as they trade off leads and compliment [sic] each other with beautiful harmonies...Add to that the depth of the lyrical content and you have an amazing worship album. The duo tackles some fairly big theological themes; Christ’s death and resurrection, miracles, and grace...It’s a great backstory that gives them credibility." Rewarding the album a four star rating at The Christian Beat, Madeleine Dittmer says, "These songs with their powerful lyrics and beautiful melodies certainly deserve a place among other worship favorites, and are a must listen for CCM fans."

== Track listing ==
No.	Title	Length
1.	"Walk on Waves"	3:57
2.	"It Is Finished"	4:31
3.	"Maker of Miracles"	5:09
4.	"Lost in You"	4:02
5.	"Infinite Grace"	4:42
Total length:		22:21

Bonus track
No.	Title	Length
6.	"Oh Liberty"	3:22
