= Austin Adamec =

American songwriter (born 1988)

- Born: Austin Mark Adamec; March 21, 1988 (age 38); Jacksonville, Florida, U.S.
- Genres: Christian pop, worship
- Occupations: Singer, songwriter, guitarist
- Instruments: vocals, guitar
- Years active: 2011–present
- Label: Reunion
- Member of: Austin & Lindsey Adamec
- Website: austinadamec.com

Austin Mark Adamec (born March 21, 1988) is an American Christian musician and guitarist, who primarily plays Christian pop music. He has released one studio album, All the Brighter, in 2015. The song, "My Only Answer", charted on the Billboard magazine Christian Airplay chart.

== Early and background ==
Austin Mark Adamec was born on March 21, 1988, in Jacksonville, Florida, whose father is Mark Allan Adamec and mother Diane Lynn Adamec (née, Uythoven). He is the eldest of three brothers, while his middle brother is Asher, and his younger brother is Alec. His hometown is Jacksonville, Florida, and has roots in Atlantic Beach, Florida. Adamec is a 2006 graduate of Duncan U. Fletcher High School in Neptune Beach, Florida. Adamec earned a baccalaureate in Marketing from the University of Florida, in 2010. Adamec's maternal grandparents are Peter and Ruthella Grace Uythoven (née Kuypers). His paternal grandparents are Allan and Helen Adamec (née Kulinski). He has German ancestry through his paternal great grandmother, and Dutch ancestry by his maternal grandfather. His last name being Adamec, means he has some Czech ancestry and Slovak ancestry, in his lineage. His great grandfather George Adamec, whose wife was Julia, founded Adamec Cycle Sales Co., Inc. in Linden, New Jersey in 1931 before relocating it to the Jacksonville, Florida-area. The company primarily deals with Harley-Davidson sales. His great grandfather passed the ownership on to his sons George and Allan Adamec, who then passed it on to Allan's two sons Mark and Chris Adamec. Chris Adamec is Austin's uncle and Tracie Adamac is his aunt.

== Music history ==
His earliest musical endeavor was a local Christian band, while this was with his brother, Asher, and friends, Robert McMinn and William Smith calling themselves, By Grace. The band only released an extended play, calling it, The EP, on August 18, 2009. Where nothing materialized from this entity, he started his solo career pursuit, while now his brother is studying and performing dentistry at the University of Florida.

Adamec commenced his solo musical career in 2011 by releasing a holiday single, titled, "Christmas on the Beachside", with Lindsey Ciresi. He released one independent single, "We We're After", in 2012, but it failed to chart. His first single with Reunion Records, "My Only Answer", was released in 2014, where this was his breakthrough song on the Billboard magazine charts. The song peaked at No. 40 on the Christian Airplay chart, in 2015. He released, All the Brighter, on November 3, 2015, independently, a year after it was first scheduled to be released by Reunion Records. He is currently in a musical duo, with his wife, calling themselves, Austin & Lindsey Adamec.

== Discography ==
Studio albums

- All the Brighter (November 3, 2015)
