= Carmen Justice =

American singer

- Born: Carmen B Justice; July 15, 1991 (age 35); Hendersonville, Tennessee, U.S.
- Genres: Alternative pop; pop; Christian pop; CCM
- Occupations: Singer; songwriter
- Years active: 2012–present
- Website: carmenjusticeofficial.com

Carmen Justice Hadley (born Carmen B Justice, July 15, 1991) known professionally as Carmen Justice is an Alternative pop recording artist and singer songwriter. She was first known as a member of Christian contemporary, power pop/pop rock band 1 Girl Nation (also known as 1GN) before leaving the group and launching a solo career in 2017.

== Musical career ==
In 2012, Justice joined 1 Girl Nation along with other band members Lauryn Taylor Bach, Lindsey Adamec, Kayli Robinson, and Kelsey Grimm. In June 2013, the band was signed to Reunion Records, and released their self-titled debut album on August 20, 2013. The album charted at No. 11 and No. 9 on the Top Christian Albums and the Top Heatseekers Albums charts respectively, for the Billboard charting week of September 7, 2013. On December 14, 2013, Billboard charts the album was the No. 2 Heatseekers Albums. 1 Girl Nation was nominated for a Dove Award at the 47th Annual GMA Dove Awards for Best New Artist in 2014. In 2015, the band changed their name to 1GN and released their follow-up album, Unite, on April 15, 2016. In January 2017, it was announced that the band had split.

In 2017, it was announced that Justice would release her first solo single "Flaming Arrows" on January 20, 2017. Justice wrote and recorded the song "Flaming Arrows" days after 1 Girl Nation split. The song was written with Keithon Stribling and Jordan Stribling and was mixed/mastered by Jake Hartsfield. On January 6, 2017, CCM Magazine exclusively announced Justice was leaving 1 Girl Nation and pursuing a solo career. In an interview with New Release Today, Justice said that she is planning to release her debut EP in the fall of 2017. On February 24, 2017, Justice released a remix of "Flaming Arrows" produced by David Thulin.

On June 2, 2017, Carmen released her second single titled "Red & Yellow Black & White" (featuring GabeReal). The song featured a guest performance by GabeReal from TobyMac's Diverse City Band and was produced by David Thulin.

== Personal life ==
Justice and her husband, Matt Hadley, were married on August 14, 2015, and live in Nashville, Tennessee.

== Discography ==
=== Singles ===
- "Flaming Arrows" (January 20, 2017; Independent)
- "Flaming Arrows (David Thulin Remix)" (February 24, 2017)
- "Red & Yellow Black & White" (featuring GabeReal) (June 2, 2017)
