= 1 Girl Nation (album) =

- From left to right: Bach, Sowards, Ciresi, Robinson and Justice

Studio album by 1GN
- Released: August 20, 2013
- Recorded: 2013
- Genres: Contemporary Christian music, power pop, pop rock
- Length: 33:55
- Label: Reunion
- Producers: Casey Brown, Jason Ingram, Joshua Silverberg, Jonathan Smith, Jon White, Kipp Williams

1GN chronology
1 Girl Nation (2013)	Unite (2016)

Singles from 1 Girl Nation
- 1. "While We're Young" Released: June 14, 2013

1 Girl Nation is the eponymous debut studio album by contemporary Christian music girl band 1GN, which was released on the Reunion Records label on August 20, 2013, and was produced by Casey Brown, Jason Ingram, Joshua Silverberg, Jonathan Smith, Jon White and Kipp Williams. The album has been met with commercial charting successes and positive criticism.

== Background ==
The album was released on August 20, 2013 by Reunion Records, and it was produced by Casey Brown, Jason Ingram, Joshua Silverberg, Jonathan Smith, Jon White and Kipp Williams.

== Music and lyrics ==
At CCM Magazine, Grace S. Aspinwall wrote that "Bursting with energy and positive lyrics any parent will approve, the self-titled debut from 1 Girl Nation is teen pop gold." Kevin Davis at New Release Tuesday said that the album "features strong vocals, relevant and biblical messages and this is a solid debut album from a talented young band." At Indie Vision Music, Jonathan Andre wrote that the band "really delivered musically and lyrically", and noted how it was "Full of fun energy, pop melodies with a worshipful edge, and plenty of dance music undertones to keep the dance-pop music fans intrigued and interested". Bert Gangl of Jesus Freak Hideout stated that the release is able to go "nimbly from club-oriented dance-pop and blue-eyed funk to bracing arena-ready anthems and poignant piano ballads." At Christian Music Review, Laura Chambers noted that "The fruit of their labors is this self-titled debut, much like a bowl of fruit itself, given the variety of musical styles utilized." The Christian Manifesto's Calvin Moore wrote that "Despite some cheesy lyrics here and there, this a solid debut that works well in the pop music genre."

== Critical reception ==
Professional ratings
Review scores
Source	Rating
CCM Magazine	4/5 stars
The Christian Manifesto	3/5 stars
Christian Music Review	4.3/5
Christian Music Zine	4.5/5 stars
Cross Rhythms	9/10 squares
Indie Vision Music	4/5 stars
Jesus Freak Hideout	3.5/5 stars
Jesus Wired	4.5/5 stars
New Release Tuesday	4/5 stars
The Phantom Tollbooth	4/5 stars

1 Girl Nation garnered exceedingly positive reception from music critics to review the album. At Cross Rhythms, Hannah Rose Sadler wrote that the band "clearly have something to say and the talent to say it creatively." Grace S. Aspinwall of CCM Magazine felt that the release was "Tarnished only by some awkward rap attempts, this is a worthy effort and solid first project." At New Release Tuesday, Kevin Davis called this "the most upbeat and fun album of the year", and noted that "You won't be able to help but dance and sing along" to the release. Jonathan Andre of Indie Vision Music proclaimed this to be "a poignant, encouraging and fun-filled album!" At Jesus Freak Hideout, Alex "Tincan" Caldwell stated that the release "rises above the common cliché's of tween pop, and delivers an encouraging blast of musical fun." Bert Gangl of Jesus Freak Hideout felt that the "effort shines a decidedly optimistic light on the enthusiastic and talented quintet that graces its ingratiatingly catchy grooves." In addition, Gangl at The Phantom Tollbooth stated that "the superb 1GN debut is sure to reward those with wider-ranging tastes and the willingness to approach the album with open minds – and ears." At Christian Music Zine, Joshua Andre called the songs "a joy to listen to", and proclaimed this to be "an enjoyable and satisfying first album!" Laura Chambers of Christian Music Review told that "With a great sound and a greater message, they are a band worth your listen." At The Christian Manifesto, Calvin Moore noted that the album was "something positive." Maddy Agers of Jesus Wired suggested it was a "must-have".

== Commercial performance ==
For the Billboard charting week of September 7, 2013, 1 Girl Nation was the No. 18 most sold album in the breaking and entry chart of the United States by the Top Heatseekers and it was the No. 11 Top Christian Album as well. On December 14, 2013, Billboard Top Heatseekers Albums chart the album peaked again at No. 2.

== Track listing ==
Track listing supplied by AllMusic and Jesus Freak Hideout.

No.	Title	Writer(s)	Length
1.	"While We're Young"	Chuck Butler, Jason Ingram, Tony Wood	3:19
2.	"Vertical"	Lindsey Ciresi, Josh Silverberg, Kipp Williams	3:35
3.	"Live for You"	Lauryn Taylor Bach, Mike Green, Jason McArthur, Julia Michaels	3:07
4.	"In the Eyes"	Casey Brown, Ingram, Jonathan Smith	3:38
5.	"Count Your Rainbows"	Bach, Brown, J. Smith	3:14
6.	"Love Like Crazy" (featuring Royal Tailor)	Silverberg, Keith Everette Smith, Williams	3:32
7.	"Turn Around"	Brown, Carmen Justice, J. Smith	3:39
8.	"Invade"	Justice, Jon White	3:17
9.	"Daddy's Girl"	Jessica Campbell, Jason Cox, K. E. Smith	3:30
10.	"1 Girl Nation"	Bach, Ciresi, Barry Weeks	3:04
Total length:			33:55

== Charts ==
Chart (2013)	Peak position
US Christian Albums (Billboard)	11
US Top Heatseekers Albums (Billboard)	2
