= 1GN =

American musical group

- Also known as: 1 Girl Nation
- Origin: Nashville, Tennessee, U.S.
- Genres: pop, pop rock
- Years active: 2012–2016
- Label: Reunion
- Spinoffs: Caleb + Kelsey; Everly Fair; Austin & Lindsey Adamec
- Past members: Lauryn Taylor Bach; Kayli Robinson; Kelsey Grimm; Lindsey Adamec; Carmen Justice
- Website: www.1gnofficial.com

1GN, formerly known as 1 Girl Nation, was a contemporary Christian, power pop and pop rock band from Nashville, Tennessee, United States. They are on the Reunion Records label, affiliated with Provident Label Group and Sony Music Entertainment, and released their first album entitled 1 Girl Nation on August 20, 2013. The album has had chart successes.

== Background ==
In 2012, 1 Girl Nation was formed in Nashville, Tennessee, and the band members are Lauryn Taylor Bach from Birmingham, Alabama, Lindsey Adamec from Jacksonville, Florida, Carmen Justice from Nashville, Tennessee, Kayli Robinson from Orlando, Florida, and Kelsey Grimm from Chicago, Illinois. On May 1, 2014, the band announced that Kelsey was leaving the band because she was getting married.

== Music ==
In June 2013, the band was signed to Reunion Records, a major Christian music label in the United States.

=== 1 Girl Nation ===
On August 20, 2013, 1 Girl Nation released their self-titled debut album 1 Girl Nation. 1 Girl Nation charted at No. 11 and No. 9 on the Top Christian Albums and the Top Heatseekers Albums charts respectively, for the Billboard charting week of September 7, 2013. On December 14, 2013, Billboard charts the album was the No. 2 Heatseekers Albums.

=== Unite ===
Their second album, Unite, was released on April 15, 2016, by Reunion Records.

== Members ==
Former members

- Lauryn Taylor Bach (born Lauren Taylor Bachofer; November 24, 1991) – vocals (2012–2016)
- Kayli Robinson (born June 30, 1988) – vocals (2012–2016)
- Kelsey Taylor Grimm (née, Sowards; born December 29, 1989) – vocals (2012–2014)
- Lindsey Brooke Adamec (née, Ciresi; born October 27, 1992) – vocals (2012–2014)
- Carmen Justice Hadley (born July 15, 1991) – vocals (2012–2016)

== Sponsorships ==
In September 2013, 1 Girl Nation obtained sponsorships from Anytime Fitness (the Nashville, TN location), MAC Cosmetics and 1964 Ears.

== Discography ==
=== Studio albums ===
List of studio albums, with selected chart positions
| Title | Album details | Peak chart positions | |
| Title | Album details | US Christ | US Heat |
|---|---|---|---|
| 1 Girl Nation | Released: August 20, 2013; Label: Reunion; Formats: CD, digital download | 11 | 2 |
| Unite | Released: April 15, 2016; Label: Reunion; Formats: CD, digital download | 44 | — |

=== Extended plays ===
| Title | Album details |
|---|---|
| A Very 1 Girl Nation Christmas | Released: October 7, 2014; Label: Reunion; CD, digital download |

=== Singles ===
- "While We're Young" (2013)
- "Try" (2014)
- "Get Hype" (2016)
- "Guard Your Heart"(2016)

=== Music videos ===
- "While We're Young" (2013)
- "Try" (2014)
- "Joy" (2014)
- "Get Hype" (2016)
