= Jan Franciszek Adametz =

Polish printer

Jan Franciszek Adametz was a Polish printer of 18th century Wrocław.

He printed for the magazine Schlesischer Nouvellen Courier in the years 1736–1741, previously issued by his father in law, Karl Leopold Bachler. In times of Prussian rule as a result of conflicts with the censors he did not obtain the privilege of publishing grace and had to leave the city.
