= Martina Adamcová =

Czech-Canadian film producer

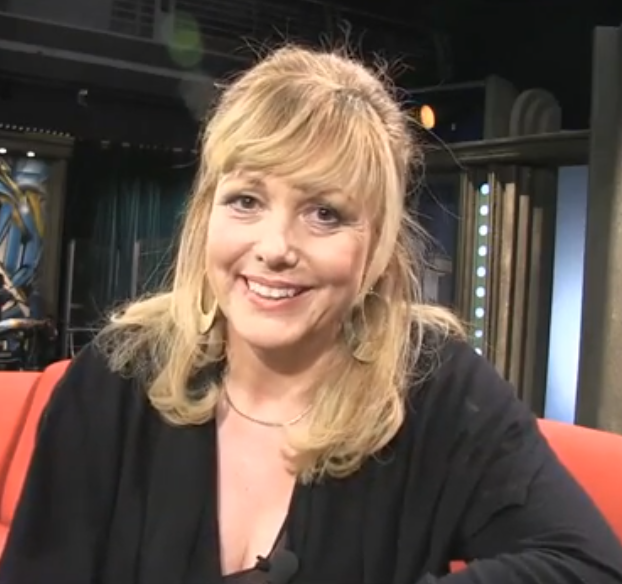
- On Show Jana Krause in 2014
- Born: 22 April 1966 (age 60); Ostrava, Czechoslovakia
- Occupations: Film producer, actress, screenwriter
- Years active: 1991–present

Martina Adamcová (also known under pseudonym Tina Adams; born 22 April 1966) is a Czech–Canadian film producer, screenwriter and actor. Known for her light comedic style and accessible storytelling, Martina has become a recognized figure in the neo-Canadian film scene.

She resides in Montreal, Canada, where she is active in the local film community and continues to develop international co-productions through her company, Marcova Productions.

== Life and career ==
Martina Adamcová was born in Ostrava, Czechoslovakia on 22 April 1966. She spent her childhood in Prague. She pursued formal training in acting under the Stanislavski System of acting.

In the post-communist era, Adamcová began her career in television and film in the Czech Republic. She worked as a television presenter and actress and was the first host of Jeux sans frontières, a popular pan-European entertainment television show. Her role as Officer Babinčáková in the cult Czech military comedy Tankový prapor ("Tank Battalion", 1991) contributed to her lasting image as a sex symbol. In 1994, she moved to Canada to join her boyfriend and later husband, with whom she has a son.

She also produced and appeared in numerous television programs for Czech Republic broadcasting, establishing herself as a prominent figure in the country's media industry.

Seeking new creative opportunities, Martina Adamcová relocated to North America, where she began using the pseudonym Tina Adams for her directing work. Her transition into filmmaking led her to found Marcova Productions.

Her directorial debut in short films includes V Trávě (2018) and Trick and Cheat (2019), both characterized by elements of fantasy and dark humor. She gained wider recognition with the release of her feature film The Perfect Kiss (2018), followed by Hotel Limbo (2020), and My Wacko Parents (2022), all starring Czech actress and pop singer Lucie Vondráčková and Canadian actress Liliana Komorowska. These films have been showcased in various international festivals and praised for their accessible, audience-friendly narratives.

Adams has also received accolades for her work, including two awards for Best Director at independent film festivals.

Since 2023 Adamcová has collaborated closely with French-Canadian filmmaker Noël Mitrani, serving as a producer on several of his films. Her contributions helped bring Noël Mitrani's work to broader audiences in both Canada and abroad.

In addition to fiction films, Adamcová has ventured into documentary filmmaking. Her works include Live on Borrowed Time and Concealed Identity, which follows the lives of Holocaust survivors, and Harlem, a documentary exploring the historical and cultural significance of African-American landmarks in New York City.

Under her birth name Martina Adamcová, she continues to act in both Canadian and international productions. Her acting credits include roles in French Kiss, As Light As a Breath, Perfect Assistant, Sirens, Who Is Simon Miller?, and Killer Kids.

== Filmography ==
=== As actress ===
- 1991 – Tankový prapor
- 1993 – Nahota na prodej
- 1995 – Playgirls
- 2008 – As Light As a Breath
- 2011 – Who Is Simon Miller?
- 2011 – French Kiss
- 2012 – Perfect Assistant
- 2012 – Sirens
- 2024 – Once Upon A Princess

=== As director (as Tina Adams) ===
- 2019 – Trick and Cheat
- 2018 – The Perfect Kiss
- 2020 – Hotel Limbo
- 2022 – My Wacko Parents

=== As producer ===
- 2018 – The Perfect Kiss
- 2023 – Emma Under Influence
- 2025 – Révolté
- 2025 – Harlem
