= Luboš Adamec (footballer) =

Czech footballer (born 1994)

Personal information
- Date of birth: 27 April 1994 (age 32)
- Place of birth: Brno, Czech Republic
- Height: 1.89 m (6 ft 2 in)
- Position: Defender

Youth career
- SK Slatina
- TJ Tatran Bohunice
- FC Svratka Brno
- –2010: 1. FC Brno
- 2010–2011: Juventus
- 2011–2012: Sparta Prague

Senior career*
Years	Team	Apps	(Gls)
2012–2013	Sparta Prague	0	(0)
2012–2013	→ Přední Kopanina (loan)	1	(0)
2013–2014	Śląsk Wrocław	2	(1)
2013–2014	Śląsk Wrocław II	16	(4)
2014–2015	Lupa Castelli Romani		
2015	RKSV Leonidas	4	(0)
2015	FC Stadlau	1	(0)
2015–2016	Xewkija Tigers		
2016–2017	Naxxar Lions	24	(4)
2017–2019	Qormi	26	(5)
2019	Oberlausitz Neugersdorf	1	(0)
2019–2020	Pietà Hotspurs	7	(0)

International career
2011	Czech Republic U17	9	(0)
- * Club domestic league appearances and goals

Lubos Adamec (born 27 April 1994) is a Czech former professional footballer who played as a defender.

== Career ==
A youth player at Juventus and Sparta Prague, Adamec made his senior debut while on loan at Přední Kopanina. In 2013, he signed for Śląsk Wrocław in the Polish Ekstraklasa, where he made two appearances and scored one goal. After that, he played for RKSV Leonidas, Stadlau, Xewkija Tigers, Naxxar Lions, Qormi, Oberlausitz Neugersdorf, and Pietà Hotspurs, where he now plays.
