= Mário Adamčík =

Slovak footballer (born 1973)

Personal information
- Date of birth: 9 September 1973 (age 53)
- Place of birth: Slovakia
- Height: 1.82 m (6 ft 0 in)
- Position: Forward

Senior career*
Years	Team	Apps	(Gls)
1992–1995	Spartak Trnava	23	(3)
1997–1999	Ružomberok	48	(10)
1998–1999	→ Rimavská Sobota (loan)	10	(1)
2000–2001	Žilina	27	(4)
2001	KuPS	24	(5)
2002–2008	UFC Purbach		
2008–2009	UFC Pamhagen	43	(24)
2010	SC Trausdorf	13	(10)
2010–2011	SC Trausdorf	26	(21)
2011	SV Draßmarkt	14	(6)

International career
- Slovakia U21
- * Club domestic league appearances and goals

Mário Adamčík (born 9 September 1973) is a Slovak former professional football player who played as a forward.

Adamčík started his senior career in 1992 and played in his native Slovakia until 2001, when he moved to Finland and signed with Veikkausliiga club Kuopion Palloseura for the season. Later he played for different teams in Austrian lower tiers until 2016, and ended his playing career aged 43.
