= Patrik Puistola =

Finnish ice hockey player (born 2001)

- Born: 11 January 2001 (age 25) Tampere, Finland
- Height: 183 cm (6 ft 0 in)
- Weight: 79 kg (174 lb; 12 st 6 lb)
- Position: Winger
- Shoots: Left
- SHL team Former teams: Frölunda HC; Tappara; Jukurit; KooKoo; JYP Jyväskylä; Örebro HK
- National team: Finland
- NHL draft: 73rd overall, 2019; Carolina Hurricanes
- Playing career: 2018–present

Patrik Puistola (born 11 January 2001) is a Finnish professional ice hockey player who is a winger for Frölunda HC of the Swedish Hockey League (SHL). Puistola was selected by the Carolina Hurricanes in the third round (73rd overall) of the 2019 NHL entry draft.

== Playing career ==
Puistola made his Liiga debut for Tappara during the 2018–19 Liiga season, playing 16 games and registering one assist. He was drafted 73rd overall by the Carolina Hurricanes in the 2019 NHL entry draft.

During his second season with Tappara in 2019–20, Puistola played 24 games, notching just two assists, after a stint in the Mestis, Puistola was loaned to fellow Liiga clubs, Jukurit and KooKoo, to complete the season.

On 26 March 2020, Puistola left Tappara out of contract and transferred to JYP Jyväskylä signing a two-year contract.

During the 2022–23 season, having returned to Jukurit and in the midst of setting new career offensive highs, Puistola's NHL rights were traded by the Hurricanes to the Edmonton Oilers in exchange for Jesse Puljujärvi on 28 February 2023.

After six seasons in the Liiga, Puistola opted to move abroad in securing a two-year contract with Swedish club, Örebro HK of the SHL, on 7 May 2024.

On 21 April 2026, Puistola left Örebro and moved to fellow SHL club, Frölunda HC, after signing a two-year contract.

Medal record

Men's ice hockey

Representing Finland

World Championships
Gold medal – first place	2026 Switzerland	

== Career statistics ==
=== Regular season and playoffs ===
			Regular season					Playoffs
Season	Team	League	GP	G	A	Pts	PIM	GP	G	A	Pts	PIM
2017–18	Tappara	Jr. A	50	15	14	29	12	9	3	2	5	4
2018–19	Tappara	Jr. A	25	11	11	22	18	—	—	—	—	—
2018–19	Tappara	Liiga	16	0	1	1	0	—	—	—	—	—
2018–19	LeKi	Mestis	22	15	11	26	2	8	3	4	7	2
2019–20	Tappara	Liiga	24	0	2	2	2	—	—	—	—	—
2019–20	Koovee	Mestis	4	1	3	4	0	—	—	—	—	—
2019–20	Jukurit	Liiga	7	3	2	5	0	—	—	—	—	—
2019–20	KooKoo	Liiga	14	3	2	5	0	—	—	—	—	—
2020–21	JYP Jyväskylä	Liiga	50	4	10	14	16	—	—	—	—	—
2021–22	JYP Jyväskylä	Liiga	2	0	0	0	0	—	—	—	—	—
2021–22	Jukurit	Liiga	54	16	8	24	6	7	1	2	3	6
2022–23	Jukurit	Liiga	60	16	24	40	12	—	—	—	—	—
2023–24	Jukurit	Liiga	54	19	26	45	14	6	5	3	8	0
2024–25	Örebro HK	SHL	52	18	21	39	12	3	3	1	4	2
2025–26	Örebro HK	SHL	50	14	22	36	19	3	1	1	2	2
Liiga totals			281	61	75	136	50	13	6	5	11	6
SHL totals			102	32	43	75	31	6	4	2	6	4

=== International ===
Year	Team	Event	Result	GP	G	A	Pts	PIM
2017	Finland	U17	6th	5	2	4	6	0
2018	Finland	HG18	7th	4	4	2	6	14
2019	Finland	U18	7th	5	5	0	5	2
2020	Finland	WJC	4th	7	5	3	8	2
2024	Finland	WC	8th	5	0	0	0	2
2025	Finland	WC	7th	8	4	1	5	2
2026	Finland	WC	1st place, gold medalist(s)	10	4	1	5	0
Junior totals				21	16	9	25	18
Senior totals				23	8	2	10	4
