= Dominik Egli =

Swiss ice hockey player (born 1998)

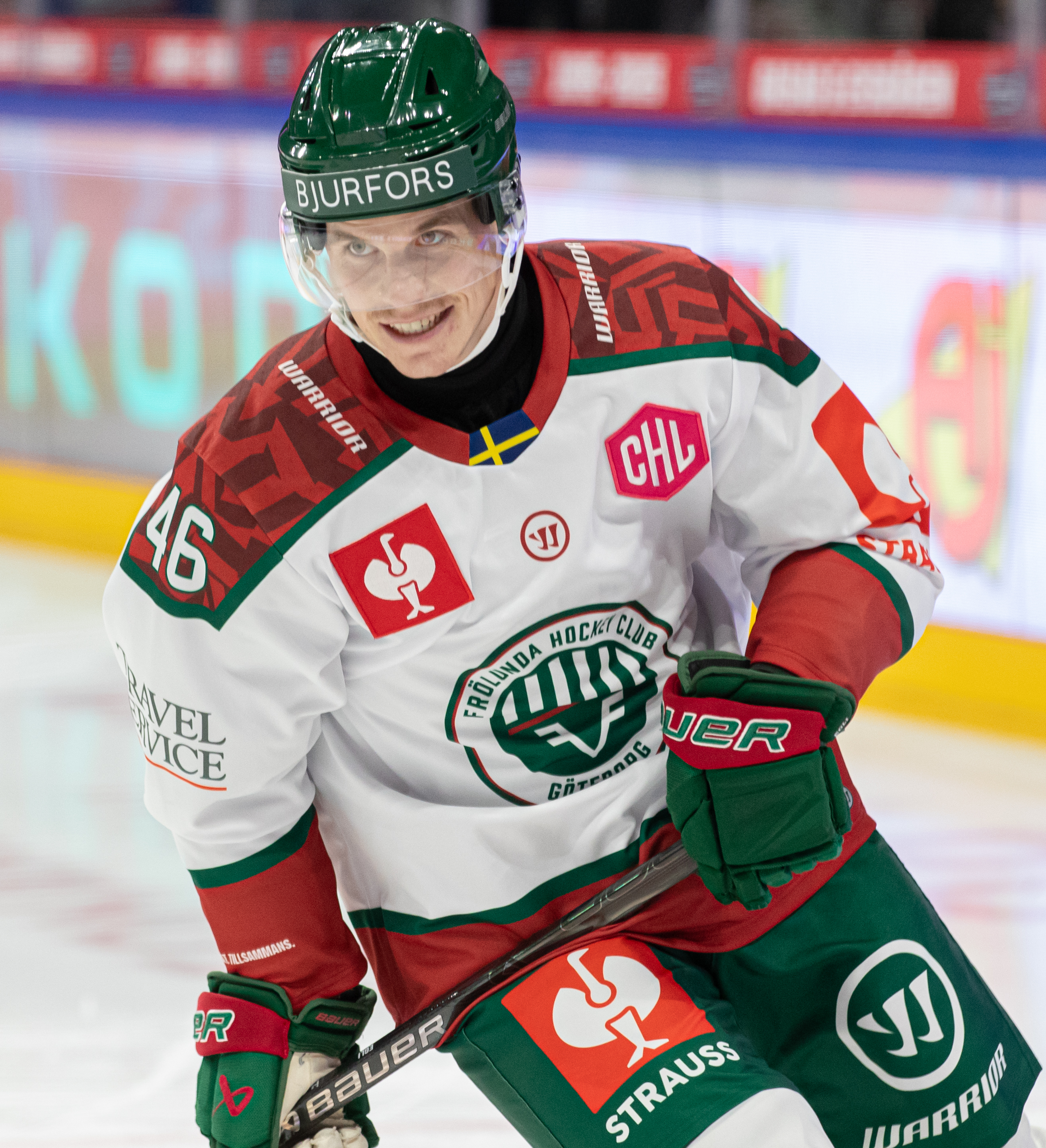
- Egli in 2025
- Born: 20 August 1998 (age 27) Frauenfeld, Switzerland
- Height: 174 cm (5 ft 9 in)
- Weight: 81 kg (179 lb; 12 st 11 lb)
- Position: Defenceman
- Shoots: Right
- SHL team Former teams: Frölunda HC; EHC Kloten; EHC Biel-Bienne; SC Rapperswil-Jona Lakers; HC Davos
- National team: Switzerland
- Playing career: 2016–present

Dominik Egli (born 20 August 1998) is a Swiss professional ice hockey player who is a defenceman for Frölunda HC of the Swedish Hockey League (SHL). He previously played in the Swiss National League (NL) for EHC Kloten, EHC Biel-Bienne, SC Rapperswil-Jona Lakers, and HC Davos.

== Playing career ==
Egli began his professional career in the 2016–17 season, playing for both EHC Kloten in the National League (NL) and EHC Winterthur in the second-tier Swiss League (SL). With Kloten Egli won the 2017 Swiss Cup. Egli spent most of the season playing for Kloten's under 20 team in the Elite Jr. A where he scored the most goals by a defenceman with 15, and totaling 29 points. Egli again spent time between the Kloten and Winterhur during the 2017–18, he played 29 regular season games with Kloten and scored his first three goals in the NL during the season. Kloten were relegated to the second-tier SL at the end of the season, and Egli signed with EHC Biel-Bienne in the NL for the 2018–19 season where he spent most of the time, but he was stil loaned to his former team Kloten in the SL.

For the 2019–20 season Egli signed with SC Rapperswil-Jona Lakers of the NL where he had a breakout season, scoring seven goals and 29 assists, which was most assists by a defenceman in the league. Egli was voted Most Improved Player by the media and to the media Swiss All-Star Team. He spent two seasons with Rapperswil-Jona, improving his scoring to eight goals but had fewer assist with 15. For the 2021–22 season Egli signed with HC Davos, he spent three seasons with Davos culminating with winning the 2023 Spengler Cup.

Egli signed a two-year contract with Frölunda HC of the Swedish Hockey League (SHL) starting in the 2023–24 season. His former agent Martin Plüss who previously played for Frölunda HC recommended it as a good move for his career.

== Career statistics ==
=== Regular season and playoffs ===
			Regular season					Playoffs
Season	Team	League	GP	G	A	Pts	PIM	GP	G	A	Pts	PIM
2016–17	EHC Kloten	NL	11	0	2	2	0	—	—	—	—	—
2016–17	EHC Winterthur	SL	6	0	1	1	4	—	—	—	—	—
2017–18	EHC Winterthur	SL	6	0	2	2	4	—	—	—	—	—
2017–18	EHC Kloten	NL	29	3	3	6	4	15	2	4	6	4
2018–19	EHC Biel-Bienne	NL	23	1	4	5	10	—	—	—	—	—
2018–19	EHC Kloten	SL	8	0	2	2	8	5	0	1	1	0
2019–20	SC Rapperswil-Jona Lakers	NL	45	7	29	36	20	—	—	—	—	—
2020–21	SC Rapperswil-Jona Lakers	NL	45	8	15	23	34	11	3	2	5	6
2021–22	HC Davos	NL	47	6	18	24	14	10	1	3	4	8
2022–23	HC Davos	NL	47	8	19	27	24	5	0	3	3	2
2023–24	HC Davos	NL	45	7	28	35	16	7	1	2	3	6
2024–25	Frölunda HC	SHL	38	4	14	18	18	12	3	2	5	8
NL totals			292	40	118	158	122	48	7	14	21	26

Medal record

Representing Switzerland

Ice hockey

World Championships
Silver medal – second place	2025 Sweden/Denmark	
Silver medal – second place	2026 Switzerland	

=== International ===
Year	Team	Event	Result	GP	G	A	Pts	PIM
2018	Switzerland	WJC	8th	5	0	0	0	0
2022	Switzerland	WC	5th	8	1	0	1	4
2025	Switzerland	WC	2nd place, silver medalist(s)	3	2	1	3	0
2026	Switzerland	WC	2nd place, silver medalist(s)	10	0	4	4	4
Junior totals				5	0	0	0	0
Senior totals				21	3	5	8	8
