= Giancarlo Chanton =

Swiss ice hockey player

- Born: November 29, 2002 (age 22); Büsserach, Switzerland
- Height: 6 ft 2 in (188 cm)
- Weight: 188 lb (85 kg; 13 st 6 lb)
- Position: Defense
- Shoots: Left
- NL team: Genève-Servette HC
- NHL draft: Undrafted
- Playing career: 2021–present

Giancarlo Chanton (born 29 November 2002) is a Swiss professional ice hockey defenseman who is currently playing with Genève-Servette HC of the National League (NL).

== Playing career ==
Chanton played his junior hockey with the Niagara IceDogs of the Ontario Hockey League (OHL).

On May 13, 2021, Chanton signed his first professional contract with Genève-Servette HC of the National League (NL), agreeing to a three-year deal through the 2023/24 season.

On June 8, 2021, it was announced that Chanton would be loaned to SC Langenthal of the Swiss League (SL) for the 2021/22 season.

== International play ==
Chanton was named to Switzerland's junior team for the 2021 World Junior Championships in Edmonton, Canada.
