= Adamiec =

Adamiec is a Polish surname. Notable people with the surname include:

- Adam Adamiec, Nobody Sleeps in the Woods Tonight Part 2 character
- Daniel Adamiec (born 1995), Polish boxer
- Janusz Adamiec (born 1962), Polish ice hockey player
- Józef Adamiec (born 1954), Polish football defender
- Tomasz Adamiec (born 1982), Polish judoka
- Zenek Adamiec, Nie ma mocnych character
