= Catena Arena =

Arena in Ängelholm, Sweden

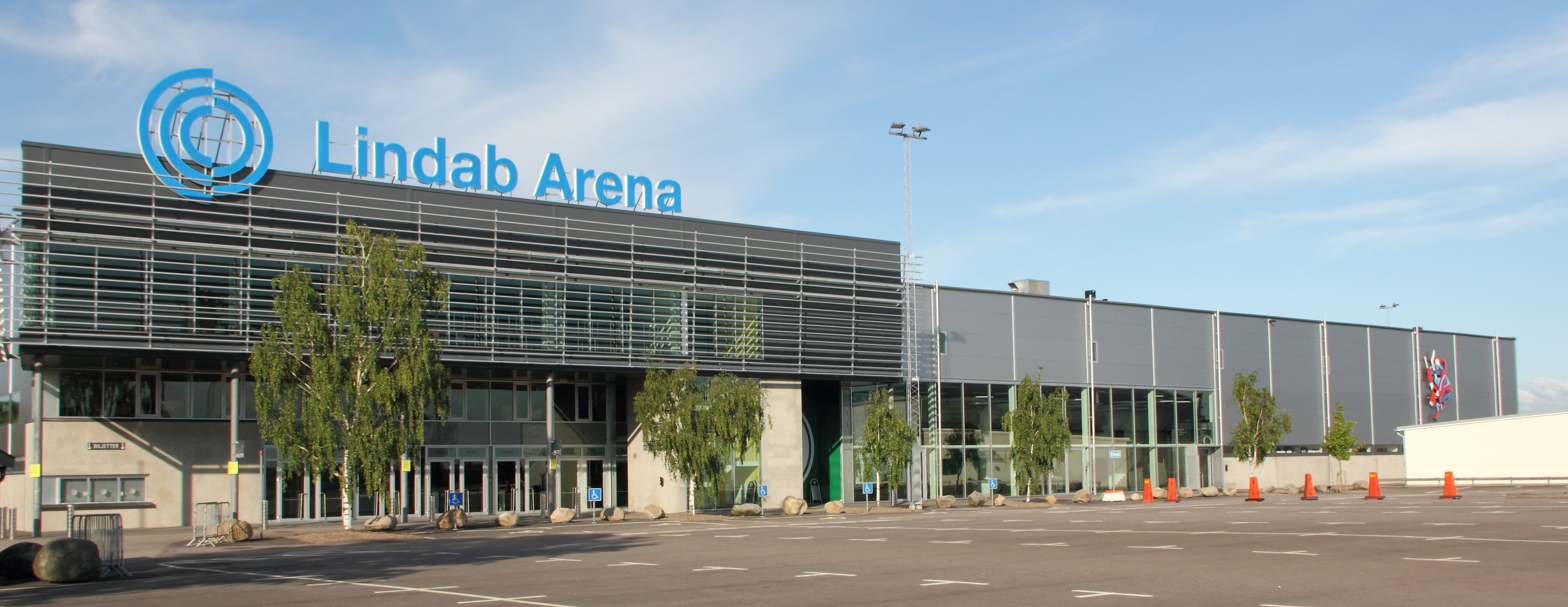
- Catena Arena in July 2011
- Interactive map of Catena Arena
- Location: Ängelholm, Sweden
- Coordinates: 56°13′33″N 12°50′42″E
- Capacity: 6,310

Construction
- Opened: 20 September 2008
- Renovated: 2015
- Expanded: 2022
- Architect: Tengbom Michelsen Arkitekter

Tenant
- Rögle BK (SHL) (2008–present)

Catena Arena is an indoor arena in Ängelholm, Sweden. It was inaugurated on 20 September 2008. Replacing the former Ängelholms ishall, the capacity is 6,310. It is the home for the Rögle BK ice hockey team.

== History ==
The former Lindab Arena, until 2008 known as Ängelholms Ishall, was located on the same ground. It had a capacity of 4,600 and was built in 1983 after the old stadium Vegeholms Ishall burned to the ground in a fire in 1982 (built in 1963).

== See also ==
- List of indoor arenas in Sweden
- List of indoor arenas in Nordic countries
