= Marian Adámek =

Czech ice hockey player

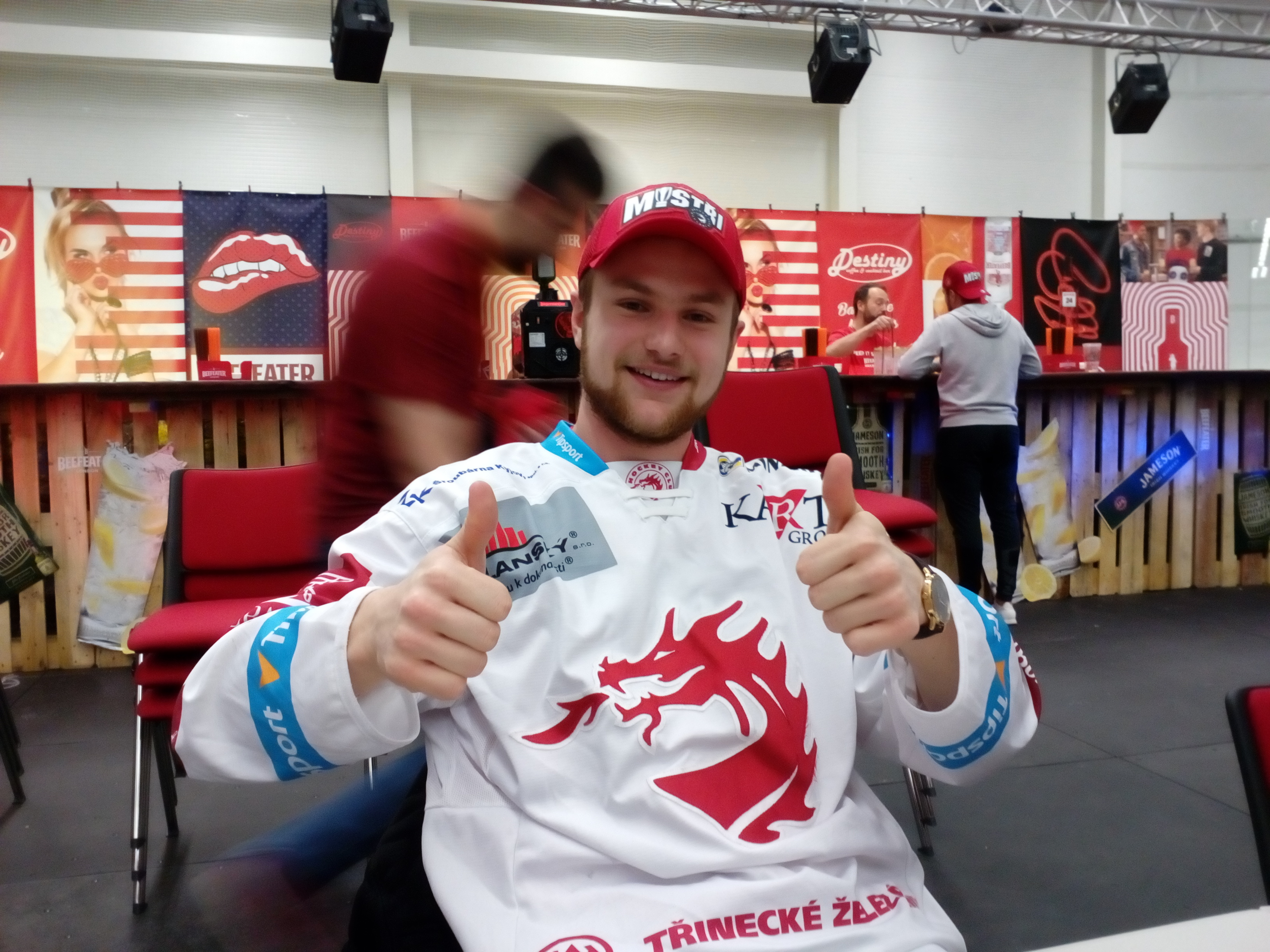
- Born: 2 October 1997 (age 27); Czech Republic
- Height: 6 ft 0 in (183 cm)
- Weight: 174 lb (79 kg; 12 st 6 lb)
- Position: Defence
- Shoots: Right
- Czech team: HC Oceláři Třinec
- NHL draft: Eligible 2018
- Playing career: 2015–present

Marian Adámek (born 2 October 1997) is a Czech ice hockey defenceman. He is currently playing with HC Oceláři Třinec of the Czech Extraliga.

Adámek made his Czech Extraliga debut playing with HC Oceláři Třinec during the 2014–15 Czech Extraliga season.

== Personal life ==
Adámek belongs to the Polish minority in the Czech Republic. He is a graduate of the Juliusz Słowacki Polish Gymnasium in Český Těšín.
