= Jesse Puljujärvi =

Finnish ice hockey player (born 1998)

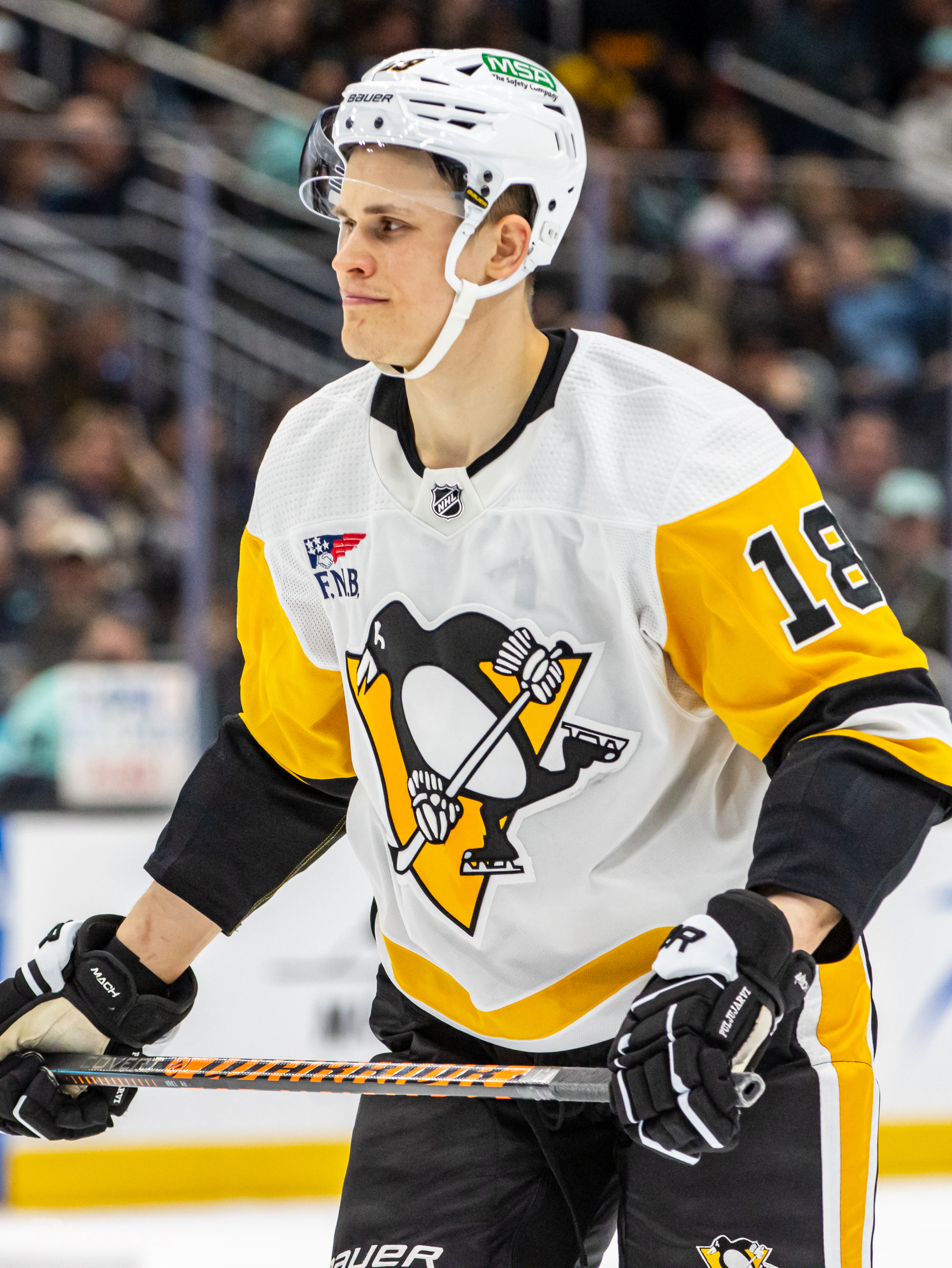
- Puljujärvi in 2024
- Born: 7 May 1998 (age 28) Älvkarleby, Sweden
- Height: 6 ft 4 in (193 cm)
- Weight: 216 lb (98 kg; 15 st 6 lb)
- Position: Winger
- Shoots: Right
- NL team Former teams: Genève-Servette HC; Oulun Kärpät; Edmonton Oilers; Carolina Hurricanes; Pittsburgh Penguins; Florida Panthers
- National team: Finland
- NHL draft: 4th overall, 2016; Edmonton Oilers
- Playing career: 2014–present

Jesse Puljujärvi (Finnish: [ˈjesːe ˈpuljuˌjærʋi]; born 7 May 1998) is a Finnish professional ice hockey player who is a winger for Genève-Servette HC of the National League (NL).

Once rated as a top prospect, Puljujärvi was drafted fourth overall by the Edmonton Oilers in the 2016 NHL entry draft.

Puljujärvi played his junior years in Tornio and Oulu. He became a professional in 2014 after signing a contract with the Oulun Kärpät of the Liiga. He played in the NHL between 2016 and 2025, mostly for the Oilers and also briefly for the Carolina Hurricanes. Puljujärvi, although born in Sweden, represents Finland internationally.

== Playing career ==
=== Junior career ===
Puljujärvi was born in Älvkarleby, Sweden, on 7 May 1998. When he was four years old, his family moved to Tornio, Finland, where he began playing ice hockey and bandy at Tornio IHC. Puljujärvi played in the 2011 Quebec International Pee-Wee Hockey Tournament with the Finland Selects youth team. Puljujärvi moved to Oulu alone at the age of 13 and started to play in the local hockey club Kärpät. In the 2011–12 season, he scored a total of 15 goals and 41 points in 30 regular season and qualifying matches in the U16 junior team. In the following season, Puljujärvi moved up to the U18 juniors and scored 51 points, which earned him the Heino Pulli award given to the U18 rookie of the year. Puljujärvi played for the U16 team in the playoffs, who won the Finnish Championship.

In the 2013–14 season, Puljujärvi played mostly in Kärpät U20 juniors. The season was interrupted by a femur fracture, which sidelined Puljujärvi for the first two months of the season. Despite this, he became one of the key players in his team at only 15 years old, scoring 23 points in 18 regular season matches. In the 2014 playoffs, seven goals were scored in 12 matches. At the end of the season, Kärpät won the U20 junior championship silver medal.

=== Professional ===
==== Oulun Kärpät (2014–2016) ====
In May 2014, Puljujärvi signed a three-year Liiga contract with Kärpät. He already played with the team in the first practice match of the 2014–15 season on 7 August 2014, against Kalevan Pallo, scoring one goal and an assist that led to the goal. The next time Puljujärvi appeared in Kärpät's roster was in the Champions Hockey League match on 5 September, against Germany's Kölner Haie. The match was his first official professional game. The game continued all the way to the shootout contest, where Puljujärvi managed to score with his only attempt.

Puljujärvi made his Liiga debut in the opening round of the 2014–15 season on 10 September, against Tappara, when a place opened up for him in the Kärpät's lineup after Patrick Davis was injured. Puljujärvi became the youngest player in the team's history at the age of only 16 years, four months and three days. He was immediately named to the Kärpät's first team next to Nicolas Deschamps and Mika Pyörälä and Puljujärvi got 11.53 minutes of ice time. In the match, he also had one assist on Julius Junttila's goal, which was the first goal of the entire season. Puljujärvi thus also became the youngest player to score a point in Kärpät's history. He scored his first goal in his third match on 17 September, away against Hämeenlinnan Pallokerho. At the age of 16 years, four months, and ten days, Puljujärvi became the youngest scorer in Kärpät's history and the fourth youngest scorer in the entire Liiga history.

In total, Puljujärvi scored four goals and 11 points in 21 regular-season matches during his rookie season in the Liiga. He and his club won the Finnish Championship at the end of the season. On the CHL side, Puljujärvi played three matches without points. He spent his spring season mostly on loan with the Mestis team Kajaanin Hokki, where Puljujärvi won the Mestis bronze medal at the end of the season. Torpedo Nizhny Novgorod drafted Puljujärvi as the 44th player at the KHL Junior Draft event in 2015.

In his first full Liiga season 2015–16, Puljujärvi scored 13 goals and 28 points in 50 regular season matches and four goals and nine points in ten playoff matches. At the end of the season, he won the Liiga bronze with Kärpät. In the CHL, Puljujärvi played 13 matches and scored two assists. His club won CHL silver.

In January 2016, the NHL scouting office listed Puljujärvi in second place in the draft ranking among players playing in Europe. Only Auston Matthews was ahead of him in the ranking at that time. In the April ranking, Puljujärvi finished third, behind Matthews and Patrik Laine. In the draft, the Edmonton Oilers drafted Puljujärvi as the fourth player. He signed a three-year rookie contract with the club three weeks later. Puljujärvi's seasonal salary in the NHL was $925,000 and in the AHL $70,000.

==== Edmonton Oilers (2016–2019) ====
Puljujärvi signed a three-year, entry-level contract with the Edmonton Oilers on 13 July 2016. He opted to wear sweater no. 98 with the team, making him the first NHL player to do so since 1985, when Brian Lawton wore the number in a regular season game.

In May 2016, Puljujärvi was awarded the President's trophy of the Finnish Ice Hockey Association, which is awarded to a person who has made an impressive impact on ice hockey in Finland.

Puljujärvi got a spot in the Oilers' NHL roster at the end of the fall 2016 training camp. He made his NHL debut right away in the opening round of the 2016–17 season on 12 October 2016, against the Calgary Flames. Puljujärvi was marked in the Oilers' third line next to Leon Draisaitl and Patrick Maroon. He played 12.52 minutes in the game and also scored the opening goal of his NHL career. He played 28 regular season games in the NHL in the early season, scoring one goal and eight points. Puljujärvi remained in a rather small role in the Oilers and at the end of the autumn was dropped from the squad, until in January 2017 the club sent him to the lineup of the American Hockey League (AHL) affiliate Bakersfield Condors. Condors' season in the AHL ended with the regular season, as they did not make the playoffs. Puljujärvi scored 12 goals and 28 points in 39 regular season games.

At the end of the fall 2017 training camp, the Oilers sent Puljujärvi to the AHL. He was promoted back to the NHL on 10 November after Anton Slepyhev was injured. Puljujärvi played for the Oilers until the end of the 2017–18 season, scoring 12 goals and 20 points in 65 regular season games. In January 2018, the club hired a personal English teacher for Puljujärvi, as his English was fairly basic despite the vast majority of Finns speaking English well. On 20 January 2018, Puljujärvi registered a career-high three-point game, recording one goal and two assists against the Vancouver Canucks. This would also mark the first time Puljujärvi received a first star for a game.

In November 2018, the Oilers sent Puljujärvi to the AHL again. After four games there, he was promoted back to the NHL roster. Puljujärvi played 46 regular season games in the NHL during the 2018–19 season, scoring four goals and nine assists, until his season ended in February 2019 with a hip injury that required surgery.

==== Return to Kärpät (2019–2020) ====
For the 2019–2020 season, Puljujärvi returned to the Oulun Kärpät's Liiga team with a one-year contract. There was a clause in his contract according to which Puljujärvi could have moved to the NHL in the middle of the regular season by 1 December. However, he continued in Kärpät, where Puljujärvi formed an effective number one line together with Juho Lammikko and Mika Pyörälä. He led the team in points and goals and shared the top spot in assists with Juho Lammikko. In the entire Liiga leaderboard, he was in a shared fourth place with Tappara's Kristian Kuusela, until the Liiga season was ended due to the COVID-19 pandemic after the penultimate round of the regular season. In the Champions Hockey League, Puljujärvi was Kärpät's best scorer with Michal Krištof and Jakub Krejčík with four points. In August 2020, Puljujärvi signed a one-year contract extension with Kärpät. For the 2020–2021 season, he was named the team's alternate captain.

==== Return to the Oilers (2020–2023) ====
In October 2020, Puljujärvi signed a one-way, two-year contract with the Edmonton Oilers. Puljujärvi played 16 matches for Kärpät, scoring 12 points, until the Oilers invited him to their organization in December.

As a restricted free agent following the 2021–22 season, Puljujärvi avoided arbitration with the Oilers after re-signing to a one-year, $3 million contract extension on 26 July 2022.

==== Carolina Hurricanes (2023) ====
Approaching the NHL trade deadline, Puljujärvi was traded by the Oilers to the Carolina Hurricanes in exchange for Patrik Puistola on 28 February 2023. Puljujärvi recorded two points in 17 games with Carolina.

==== Pittsburgh Penguins (2023–2025) ====
For the 2023–24 NHL season, Puljujärvi signed a professional tryout (PTO) contract with the Pittsburgh Penguins. Puljujärvi did not get a spot on the Penguins 2023–24 roster, and signed a PTO with the Wilkes-Barre/Scranton Penguins, the AHL affiliate of Pittsburgh. Puljujärvi debuted with the WBS Penguins against the Springfield Thunderbirds on 5 January 2024. Regaining his conditioning and having posted nine points through 13 games with Wilkes-Barre, on 4 February 2024, Puljujärvi was signed to a two-year, $1.6 million deal with Pittsburgh following the NHL All-Star break. Puljujärvi made his debut with the NHL's Penguins on 6 February 2024.

During the following 2024–25 season, Puljujärvi having registered 9 points through 25 appearances was placed on waivers by the Penguins on 30 December 2024. Upon clearing he was reassigned to the AHL in re-joining Wilkes-Barre/Scranton. On 8 February 2025, the Penguins organization placed Puljujärvi on unconditional waivers with the purpose of mutually terminating the remainder of his contract. Upon clearing waivers, Puljujärvi formally ended his tenure in Pittsburgh the following day.

==== Florida Panthers ====
On 10 February 2025, Puljujärvi opted to continue his career in North America, signing a professional tryout contract to remain in the AHL with the Charlotte Checkers, affiliate to the Florida Panthers. After notching three assists through his first seven games with the Checkers, Puljujärvi was signed to a two-way contract for the remainder of the season with the Florida Panthers. He was then placed on waivers on 5 March.

==== Switzerland ====
On 8 July 2025, following weeks of speculation, Puljujärvi signed a two-year contract with Genève-Servette HC of Switzerland's National League (NL).

== International play ==
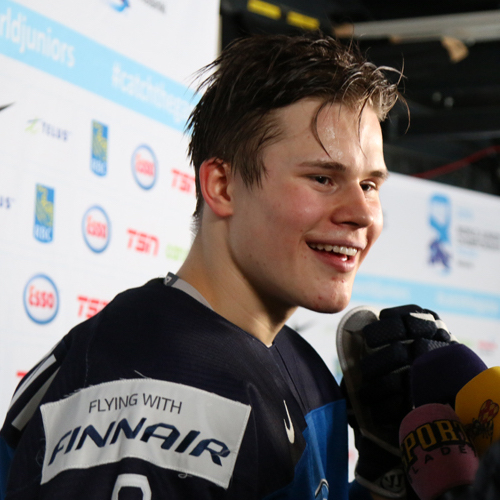

Medal record

Men's ice hockey

Representing Finland

World Championships
Gold medal – first place	2026 Switzerland	

World Junior Championships
Gold medal – first place	2016 Finland	

World U18 Championships
Gold medal – first place	2016 United States	
Silver medal – second place	2015 Switzerland	

Puljujärvi helped team Finland win the silver medal at the 2015 IIHF World U18 Championships in Switzerland. Puljujärvi played for Finland at the 2016 World Junior Championships, where they won gold on 5 January 2016. In seven games, he scored 5 goals and 12 assists for 17 points, placing him second in all-time points for an under-18 player behind only Jaromír Jágr, and tying Wayne Gretzky and Eric Lindros. He was subsequently declared Best Forward and Most Valuable Player of the tournament. Later that year, Puljujärvi was also a part of the national team at the 2016 World U18 Championships, winning another gold medal, becoming the first and so far the only European player to win a U20 and U18 gold medal in the same year.

== Playing style ==
According to statistics by Eero Mört, who specializes in puck performance reliability statistical methods, Puljujärvi's biggest challenge is puck carrying (analysis published in February 2016). In the Urheilulehti article written by Ilkka Palomäki, it is pointed out that it is typical for Puljujärvi to take disproportionately large risks when trying to deke the opponent.

According to the Corsi analysis, Puljujärvi already played offensively in the Liiga. Later in the NHL, he was played especially in offensive zone starts and in superiority situations. When he was on the ice, Kärpät usually had more chances to score than the opponent on even strength. Jatkoaika.com's Antti Wennström also noticed that Puljujärvi tried to keep possession of the puck as long as possible.

While playing in the AHL, Puljujärvi learned to change his playing style to suit the smaller rink and the North American style of play. By shaping his playing style, he got into better goal positions in his second NHL season. Sportsnet's journalist Andrew Berkshire, who specializes in statistical analysis, also emphasized Puljujärvi's play in the neutral zone. At the beginning of the season, Puljujärvi was the most effective player in his team in puck possessions, loose puck possessions and goals scored from them.

Canadian The Sports Network expert Craig Button compared Puljujärvi to Blake Wheeler, but has since come to consider him more of a Jarome Iginla-like player. Puljujärvi himself has compared his own playing style to that of Evgeni Malkin.

== Personal life ==
Puljujärvi was born to Finnish parents in Sweden and lived there until he was four. He culturally identifies as Finnish and does not speak Swedish, but is a dual citizen of Finland and Sweden. In his free time, he likes playing ice hockey with neighbourhood kids. During his time in Edmonton, he was nicknamed The Bison King after posting an image on social media of himself giving a thumbs-up while a bison was behind him.

== Career statistics ==
=== Regular season and playoffs ===
Career statistics from Elite Prospects.

			Regular season					Playoffs
Season	Team	League	GP	G	A	Pts	PIM	GP	G	A	Pts	PIM
2012–13	Kärpät	FIN U18	42	31	20	51	14	3	0	1	1	0
2013–14	Kärpät	FIN U18	8	7	7	14	8	—	—	—	—	—
2013–14	Kärpät	FIN U20	18	12	11	23	4	12	7	0	7	2
2014–15	Kärpät	FIN U20	11	12	6	18	10	5	2	1	3	4
2014–15	Kärpät	Liiga	21	4	7	11	10	—	—	—	—	—
2014–15	Hokki	Mestis	15	8	5	13	8	3	0	1	1	0
2015–16	Kärpät	Liiga	50	13	15	28	22	9	3	4	7	2
2016–17	Edmonton Oilers	NHL	28	1	7	8	10	—	—	—	—	—
2016–17	Bakersfield Condors	AHL	39	12	16	28	10	—	—	—	—	—
2017–18	Bakersfield Condors	AHL	10	1	4	5	4	—	—	—	—	—
2017–18	Edmonton Oilers	NHL	65	12	8	20	14	—	—	—	—	—
2018–19	Edmonton Oilers	NHL	46	4	5	9	16	—	—	—	—	—
2018–19	Bakersfield Condors	AHL	4	2	2	4	7	—	—	—	—	—
2019–20	Kärpät	Liiga	56	24	29	53	52	—	—	—	—	—
2020–21	Kärpät	Liiga	16	7	5	12	43	—	—	—	—	—
2020–21	Edmonton Oilers	NHL	55	15	10	25	16	4	1	1	2	0
2021–22	Edmonton Oilers	NHL	65	14	22	36	20	16	2	1	3	2
2022–23	Edmonton Oilers	NHL	58	5	9	14	30	—	—	—	—	—
2022–23	Carolina Hurricanes	NHL	17	0	2	2	2	7	0	1	1	0
2023–24	Wilkes-Barre/Scranton Penguins	AHL	13	4	5	9	8	—	—	—	—	—
2023–24	Pittsburgh Penguins	NHL	22	3	1	4	6	—	—	—	—	—
2024–25	Pittsburgh Penguins	NHL	26	3	6	9	10	—	—	—	—	—
2024–25	Wilkes-Barre/Scranton Penguins	AHL	4	1	2	3	2	—	—	—	—	—
2024–25	Charlotte Checkers	AHL	22	5	8	13	8	18	3	8	11	14
2024–25	Florida Panthers	NHL	5	1	0	1	15	—	—	—	—	—
2025–26	Genève-Servette HC	NL	52	19	33	52	18	12	6	3	9	2
Liiga totals			143	48	56	104	127	10	4	5	9	2
NHL totals			387	58	70	128	139	27	3	3	6	2

=== International ===
Year	Team	Event	Result	GP	G	A	Pts	PIM
2014	Finland	IH18	5th	4	3	2	5	4
2015	Finland	WJC	7th	5	0	0	0	0
2015	Finland	WJC18	2nd place, silver medalist(s)	7	2	5	7	4
2016	Finland	WJC	1st place, gold medalist(s)	7	5	12	17	0
2016	Finland	WJC18	1st place, gold medalist(s)	4	5	2	7	2
2017	Finland	WC	4th	8	0	0	0	4
2024	Finland	WC	8th	8	3	2	5	4
2026	Finland	WC	1st place, gold medalist(s)	10	4	5	9	2
Junior totals				27	15	21	36	10
Senior totals				26	7	7	14	10

== Awards and honours ==
Award	Year	Ref
Liiga
Kanada-malja champion	2015	
International
World U18 Championship All-Star Team	2016	
World Junior Championship All-Star Team	2016	
World Junior Championship Best Forward	2016	
World Junior Championship Most Valuable Player	2016	
Other
President's trophy	2016	

Awards and achievements
Preceded by Connor McDavid	Edmonton Oilers first-round draft pick 2016	Succeeded by Kailer Yamamoto
