= Erik Brännström =

Swedish ice hockey player (born 1999)

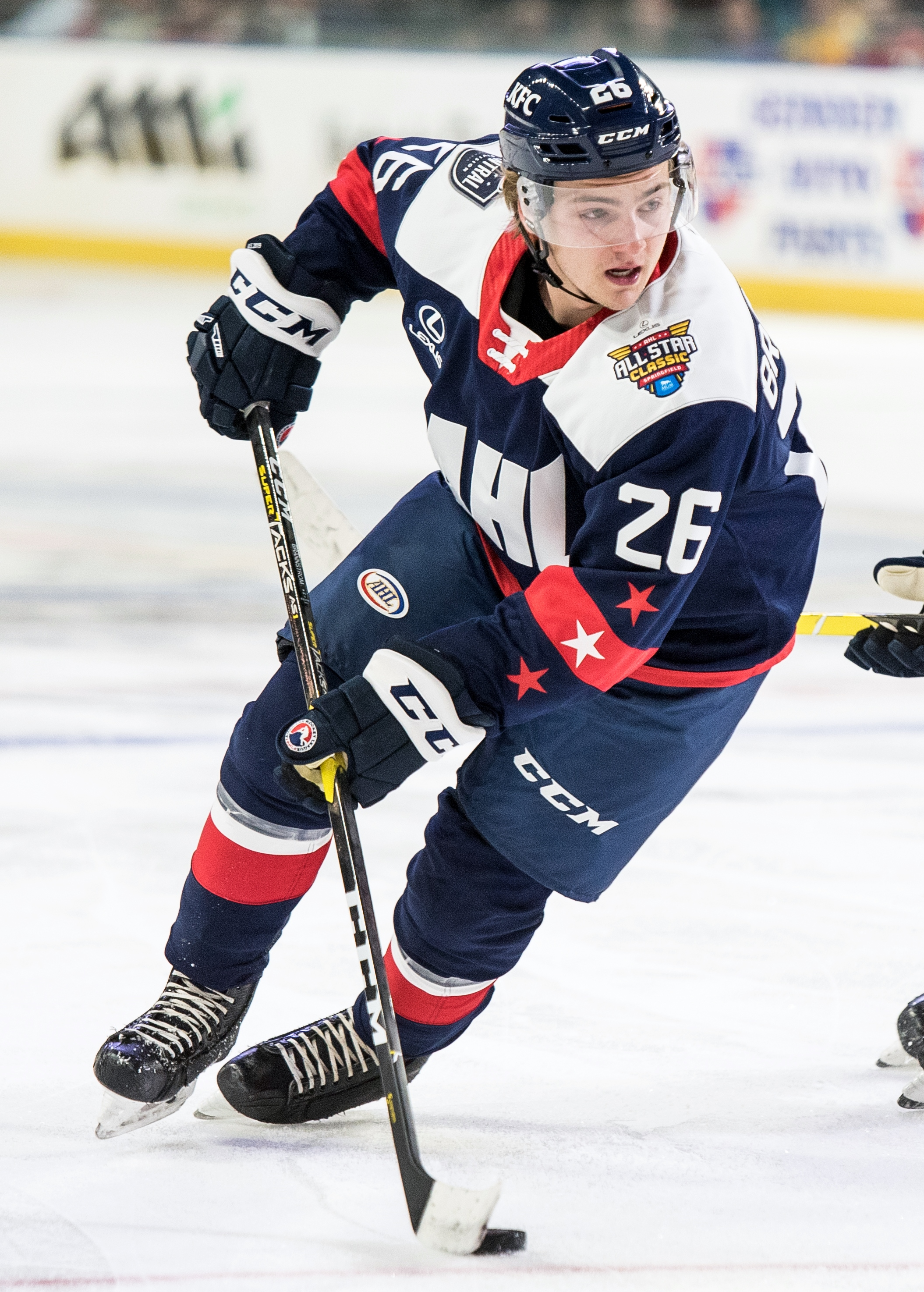
- Brännström at the 2019 AHL All-Star Game
- Born: 2 September 1999 (age 27) Eksjö, Sweden
- Height: 5 ft 10 in (178 cm)
- Weight: 185 lb (84 kg; 13 st 3 lb)
- Position: Defence
- Shoots: Left
- NL team Former teams: Lausanne HC; HV71; Ottawa Senators; SCL Tigers; Vancouver Canucks
- National team: Sweden
- NHL draft: 15th overall, 2017; Vegas Golden Knights
- Playing career: 2015–present

Erik Brännström (born 2 September 1999) is a Swedish professional ice hockey player who is a defenceman for Lausanne HC of the National League (NL). Brännström was selected 15th overall by the Vegas Golden Knights of the National Hockey League (NHL) in the 2017 NHL entry draft, and was later traded to the Ottawa Senators in 2019. He has also played for the Vancouver Canucks of the NHL, HV71 of the Swedish Hockey League and the SCL Tigers of the NL.

== Playing career ==
Brännström played junior hockey with Swedish team HV71. In 2013–14, he debuted at the under-16 level, playing twenty-three games in the J16 SM. The following season Brännström moved on to HV71's J20 SuperElit. In 2015–16, Brännström made his Swedish Hockey League debut.

He was drafted 15th overall in the 2017 NHL entry draft by the Vegas Golden Knights and agreed to a three-year, entry-level contract with the Knights on 16 July 2017. He played the 2017–18 season with the HV71 organization. Brännström earned his first NHL recall on 5 May 2018 to help the Golden Knights during their 2018 Stanley Cup playoffs run, but did not appear in any games.

Brännström attended the Golden Knights' 2018 training camp but was reassigned to the American Hockey League (AHL) on 27 September 2018. During the 2018–19 season, Brännström was selected to participate in the 2019 AHL All-Star Game.

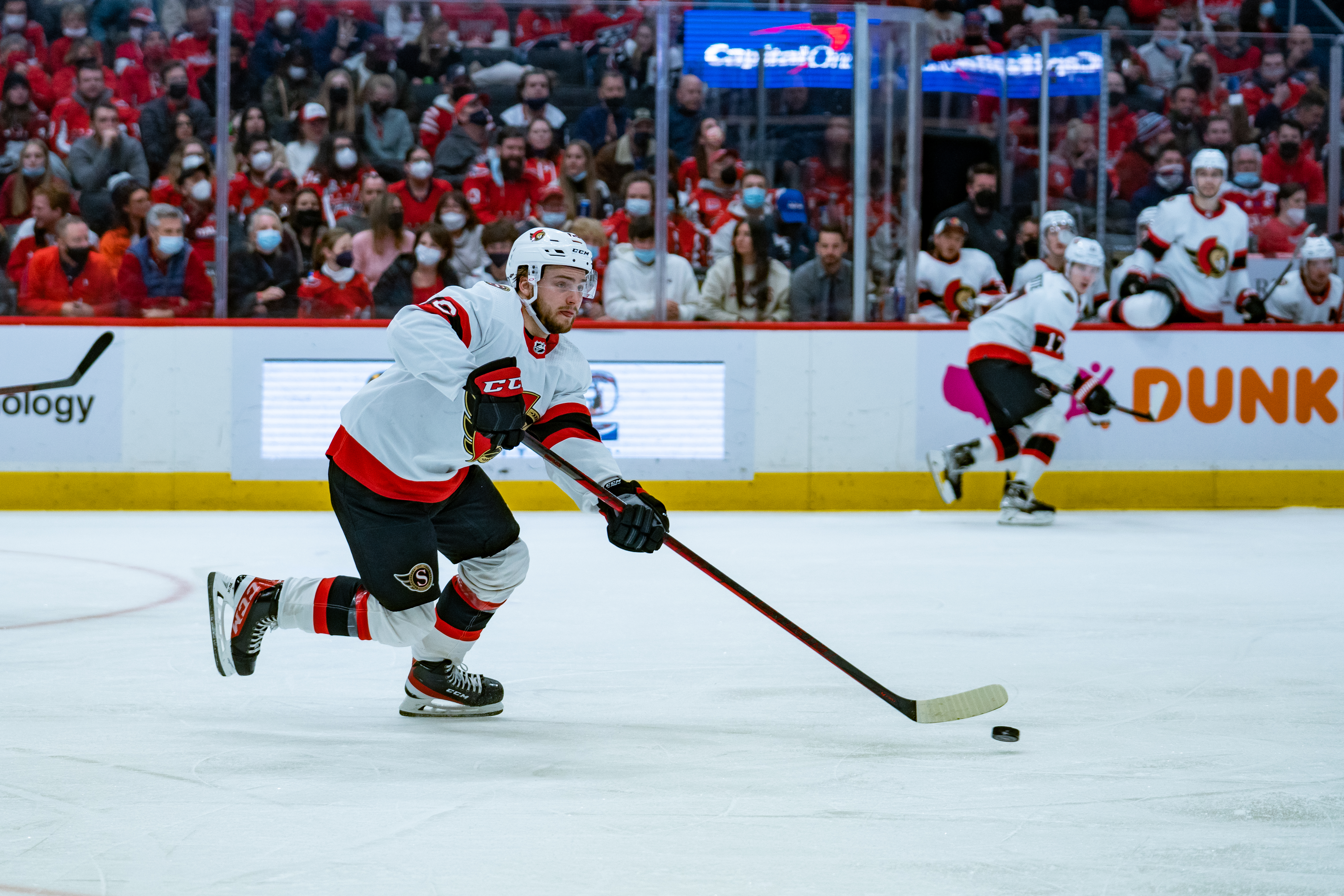
Brännström with the Ottawa Senators in 2022

On 25 February 2019, Brännström was traded to the Ottawa Senators as part of a package to acquire forwards Mark Stone and Tobias Lindberg. In addition to Brännström, Ottawa acquired Oscar Lindberg and a 2020 second-round pick in the deal. After the trade, Brännström was assigned to Ottawa's AHL team, the Belleville Senators. He was recalled from the AHL and made his NHL debut with Ottawa on 14 March 2019 in a game against the St. Louis Blues. He was then returned to Belleville following the game. He opened the 2019–20 season with the Senators, but struggled at the NHL level and was sent down to Belleville on 5 December 2019. He was recalled only 11 days later on 16 December after playing in four games with Belleville, collecting one goal and four points. Brännström was returned to Belleville on 3 January 2020. At the end of February, he suffered a wrist injury with Belleville that caused him to miss some games.

On 5 October 2020, Brännström was loaned to the SCL Tigers of the National League (NL) for the start of the 2020–21 season. He made his NL debut with the Tigers on 15 October 2020 in an 8–1 away loss to Genève-Servette HC. On 21 November 2020, in his eighth game with the Tigers, Brännström was punched in the face by EHC Biel's Damien Brunner during a line change in the third period. Brännström was not injured on the play and Brunner immediately received a game misconduct. On 11 December 2020, Brännström left the Tigers after having appeared in 10 games (8 points) to return to Ottawa for the start of training camp. The 2020–21 NHL season was abbreviated due to the COVID-19 pandemic and the season did not begin until January 2021. Brännström did not make the Ottawa Senators out of training camp and was assigned to Belleville on 13 January. He was recalled on 4 February 2021 and placed on the taxi squad. He played his first game of the season versus the Montreal Canadiens, playing on the second power play unit. He scored his first NHL goal on 24 February 2021 versus the Montreal Canadiens. On 5 May 2021, he had three assists in a 5–1 win over Montreal, marking his first multi-point game. Brännström finished the season with two goals and thirteen points in thirty games with the Senators.

Brännström began the 2021–22 season in Belleville. He was recalled on 7 November 2021 after Nick Holden was placed in COVID-19 protocol. On 13 November, he broke his hand blocking a shot in a game versus the Los Angeles Kings. He returned to the lineup on 1 January 2022. He finished the season with 14 points in 53 games with Ottawa. On 5 September 2022, Brännström signed a one-year, $900,000 contract extension with the Ottawa Senators. During the 2022–23 season Brännström's play improved as he was often called on to replace injured defenceman after a number of them, including regulars Thomas Chabot and Jakob Chychrun, were affected. He finished the season with two goals and 18 points in 74 games.

A restricted free agent at the end of the season, Brännström signed a one-year contract extension with the Senators on 1 July 2023. In the following 2023–24 season, Brännström appeared in a career best 76 regular season games, making his 200th appearance on 18 November 2023. With the Senators missing the post-season, he finished the season by notching career marks with 3 goals and 17 assists for 20 points.

As a pending restricted free agent, Brännström was released by the Senators after he was not tendered a qualifying offer, becoming an unrestricted free agent. Ending his five-year tenure with the Senators, Brännström was soon signed as a free agent to a one-year, $900,000 contract with the Colorado Avalanche on 2 July 2024. He attended the Avalanche's 2024 training camp and on the last day was traded to the Vancouver Canucks for defenceman Tucker Poolman and a 2025 fourth-round draft pick. Vancouver immediately placed him on waivers and after going unclaimed, assigned Brännström to their AHL affiliate, the Abbotsford Canucks. He was recalled by Vancouver on 16 October after teammate Derek Forbort left the Canucks for personal reasons. He made his debut on 17 October in a 3–2 overtime victory over the Florida Panthers and recorded his first point with the Canucks on 22 October, assisting on Pius Suter's third period goal. Often paired with Vincent Desharnais, Brännström tallied his first goal for the Canucks on 12 November in a 3–1 victory over the Calgary Flames. However, by January, he was in and out of the lineup and was placed on waivers. He cleared and was assigned to Abbotsford. In 28 games with Vancouver, he scored three goals and eight points.

On 31 January 2025. Brännström was traded to the New York Rangers, along with forward J. T. Miller, in exchange for forward Filip Chytil, defenceman Victor Mancini, and a 2025 first-round pick. He was immediately assigned to the Rangers' AHL affiliate, the Hartford Wolf Pack. On 7 March, he was traded to the Buffalo Sabres in exchange for forward Nicolas Aubé-Kubel. He was immediately assigned to the Sabres' AHL affiliate, the Rochester Americans.

On 26 May, Brännstörm signed with Lausanne HC, returning to the Swiss NL. The contract extends until the end of the 2027–28 season.

== Personal life ==
Brännström's older brother Isac, is also a professional hockey player, currently with Luleå HF.

== Career statistics ==
=== Regular season and playoffs ===
			Regular season					Playoffs
Season	Team	League	GP	G	A	Pts	PIM	GP	G	A	Pts	PIM
2014–15	HV71	J18	15	6	7	13	8	—	—	—	—	—
2014–15	HV71	J18 Allsv	18	2	13	15	6	7	2	3	5	4
2014–15	HV71	J20	1	0	0	0	2	—	—	—	—	—
2015–16	HV71	J18	2	2	1	3	0	—	—	—	—	—
2015–16	HV71	J18 Allsv	5	1	3	4	4	—	—	—	—	—
2015–16	HV71	J20	41	8	22	30	26	3	0	0	0	0
2015–16	HV71	SHL	3	0	0	0	0	—	—	—	—	—
2016–17	HV71	J20	19	9	14	23	18	7	3	4	7	4
2016–17	HV71	SHL	35	1	5	6	2	—	—	—	—	—
2017–18	HV71	SHL	44	2	13	15	22	2	0	1	1	2
2018–19	Chicago Wolves	AHL	41	7	21	28	36	—	—	—	—	—
2018–19	Belleville Senators	AHL	9	0	4	4	12	—	—	—	—	—
2018–19	Ottawa Senators	NHL	2	0	0	0	0	—	—	—	—	—
2019–20	Ottawa Senators	NHL	31	0	4	4	16	—	—	—	—	—
2019–20	Belleville Senators	AHL	27	3	20	23	22	—	—	—	—	—
2020–21	SCL Tigers	NL	10	2	6	8	6	—	—	—	—	—
2020–21	Ottawa Senators	NHL	30	2	11	13	25	—	—	—	—	—
2020–21	Belleville Senators	AHL	4	0	5	5	6	—	—	—	—	—
2021–22	Belleville Senators	AHL	9	1	2	3	10	—	—	—	—	—
2021–22	Ottawa Senators	NHL	53	0	14	14	30	—	—	—	—	—
2022–23	Ottawa Senators	NHL	74	2	16	18	38	—	—	—	—	—
2023–24	Ottawa Senators	NHL	76	3	17	20	36	—	—	—	—	—
2024–25	Abbotsford Canucks	AHL	8	2	10	12	14	—	—	—	—	—
2024–25	Vancouver Canucks	NHL	28	3	5	8	17	—	—	—	—	—
2024–25	Hartford Wolf Pack	AHL	6	1	3	4	2	—	—	—	—	—
2024–25	Rochester Americans	AHL	13	5	2	7	18	1	0	0	0	0
2025–26	Lausanne HC	NL	51	19	24	43	40	7	2	3	5	4
NHL totals			294	10	67	77	162	—	—	—	—	—

Medal record

Representing Sweden

Ice hockey

World Junior Championships
Silver medal – second place	2018 United States	

IIHF World U18 Championship
Silver medal – second place	2016 United States	

=== International ===
Year	Team	Event	Result	GP	G	A	Pts	PIM
2015	Sweden	IH18	2nd place, silver medalist(s)	5	0	4	4	4
2015	Sweden	U17	3rd place, bronze medalist(s)	6	3	0	3	2
2016	Sweden	WJC18	2nd place, silver medalist(s)	7	1	3	4	10
2016	Sweden	IH18	4th	5	2	1	3	31
2017	Sweden	WJC18	4th	7	2	3	5	0
2018	Sweden	WJC	2nd place, silver medalist(s)	7	1	3	4	4
2019	Sweden	WJC	5th	5	4	0	4	4
2026	Sweden	WC	7th	6	0	1	1	6
Junior totals				42	13	14	27	55
Senior totals				6	0	1	1	6

== Awards and honours ==
Award	Year	Ref
SHL
Le Mat Trophy	2017	

Awards and achievements
Preceded by Nick Suzuki	Vegas Golden Knights first-round draft pick 2017	Succeeded by Peyton Krebs
