= 2021–22 Champions Hockey League =

European ice hockey tournament

Tournament details
- Dates: 26 August 2021 – 1 March 2022
- Teams: 32

Final positions
- Champions: (Sweden) Rögle BK (1st title)
- Runners-up: (Finland) Tappara

Tournament statistics
- Games played: 123
- Goals scored: 679 (5.52 per game)
- Attendance: 244,831 (1,990 per game)
- Scoring leader: (United States) Ryan Lasch (18 points)

Awards
- MVP: (Germany) Frederik Tiffels

The 2021–22 Champions Hockey League was the seventh season of the Champions Hockey League, a European ice hockey tournament. The tournament was competed by 32 teams, with qualification being on sporting merits only. The six founding leagues were represented by between three and five teams (based on a four-year league ranking), while seven "challenge leagues" were to be represented by one team each.

Swedish team Rögle BK won their first Champions Hockey League title, defeating Finnish team Tappara 2–1 in the final. This made Rögle BK the sixth Swedish side to win the European Trophy and the first team in the history of the tournament to win the title in its first season. The title holders Frölunda HC were defeated by Rögle BK in the semi-finals with the total score 4–8.

American right winger Ryan Lasch from Swedish team Frölunda HC became the top scorer for the fourth time, scoring 18 points.

== Team allocation ==
A total of 32 teams from different European first-tier leagues participated in the 2021–22 Champions Hockey League. Besides the Continental Cup champions, 24 teams from the six founding leagues, as well as the national champions from Norway, Denmark, France, Belarus, the United Kingdom, Poland and Ukraine could qualify. The qualification for these places was set out in the rules as follows:

1. CHL champions
2. National league champions (play-off winners)
3. Regular season winners
4. Regular season runners-up
5. Regular season third-placed team
6. Regular season fourth-placed team
7. Regular season fifth-placed team

For the ICE Hockey League teams were picked in this order:

1. League champions
2. Regular season winners
3. Pick Round winners
4. Pick Round runners-up
5. Losing playoff finalists

For the Deutsche Eishockey Liga teams were picked in this order:

1. League champions
2. North / South group winners with higher PPG
3. North / South group winners with lower PPG
4. North / South group runners-up with higher PPG
5. North / South group runners-up with lower PPG

=== Teams ===
Team	City/Area	League	Qualification	Participation	Previous best
(Sweden) Frölunda HC	Gothenburg	Swedish Hockey League	2020 CHL winners	7th	Champion
(Sweden) Växjö Lakers	Växjö	Swedish Hockey League	Play-off champion	6th	Final
(Sweden) Rögle BK	Ängelholm	Swedish Hockey League	Regular season runners-up	1st	First appearance
(Sweden) Leksands IF	Leksand	Swedish Hockey League	Regular season third	1st	First appearance
(Sweden) Skellefteå AIK	Skellefteå	Swedish Hockey League	Regular season fourth	6th	Semi-finals
(Switzerland) EV Zug	Zug	National League	Play-off champion	7th	Quarter-finals
(Switzerland) HC Lugano	Lugano	National League	Regular season runners-up	3rd	Round of 16
(Switzerland) HC Fribourg-Gottéron	Fribourg	National League	Regular season third	4rd	Semi-finals
(Switzerland) Lausanne HC	Lausanne	National League	Regular season fourth	2nd	Quarter-finals
(Switzerland) ZSC Lions	Zürich	National League	Regular season fifth	6th	Quarter-finals
(Germany) Eisbären Berlin	Berlin	Deutsche Eishockey Liga	Play-off champion	5th	Round of 16
(Germany) Adler Mannheim	Mannheim	Deutsche Eishockey Liga	South group winners	6th	Round of 16
(Germany) EHC Red Bull München	Munich	Deutsche Eishockey Liga	South group runners-up	6th	Final
(Germany) Fischtown Pinguins	Bremerhaven	Deutsche Eishockey Liga	North group runners-up	1st	First appearance
(Finland) Lukko	Rauma	Liiga	Play-off champion	4th	Semi-finals
(Finland) HIFK	Helsinki	Liiga	Regular season runners-up	6th	Quarter-finals
(Finland) TPS	Turku	Liiga	Regular season third	6th	Quarter-finals
(Finland) Tappara	Tampere	Liiga	Regular season fourth	7th	Round of 16
(Czech Republic) Oceláři Třinec	Třinec	Czech Extraliga	Play-off champion	6th	Semi-finals
(Czech Republic) HC Sparta Praha	Prague	Czech Extraliga	Regular season winners	4th	Final
(Czech Republic) BK Mladá Boleslav	Mladá Boleslav	Czech Extraliga	Regular season third	2nd	Group stage
(Austria) EC KAC	Klagenfurt	ICE Hockey League	Play-off champion	4th	Group stage
(Italy) HC Bolzano	Bolzano	ICE Hockey League	Regular season winners	3rd	Round of 16
(Austria) Red Bull Salzburg	Salzburg	ICE Hockey League	Higher ranked semi-finalists	6th	Semi-finals
(United Kingdom) Cardiff Devils	Cardiff	Elite Ice Hockey League	2019–20 regular season winners	4th	Group stage
(France) Dragons de Rouen	Rouen	Ligue Magnus	Regular season winners	3rd	Round of 16
(Norway) Frisk Asker Ishockey	Asker	Eliteserien	Regular season winners	2nd	Group stage
(Poland) JKH GKS Jastrzębie	Jastrzębie-Zdrój	Polska Hokej Liga	Play-off champion	1st	First appearance
(Denmark) Rungsted Ishockey	Rungsted	Metal Ligaen	Play-off champion	2nd	Group stage
(Denmark) SønderjyskE Ishockey	Vojens	Metal Ligaen	2019–20 Continental Cup winner	3rd	Group stage
(Ukraine) HC Donbass	Donetsk (Note: HC Donbass played their home matches at Palace of Sports, Kyiv, instead of their regular arena Altair Arena, Druzhkivka.)	Ukrainian Hockey League	Wild card	1st	First appearance
(Slovakia) Slovan Bratislava (Note: HC Slovan Bratislava replaced Yunost Minsk due to the political situation in Belarus.)	Bratislava	Tipos extraliga	Wild card	1st	First appearance

== Round and draw dates ==
The schedule of the competition is as follows.

Phase	Round		Draw date	First leg	Second leg
Group stage	Matchday 1	Groups A-F	19 May 2021	26–27 August 2021	
Group stage	Matchday 1	Groups G-H	19 May 2021	9–10 September 2021	
Group stage	Matchday 2	Groups A-F	19 May 2021	28–29 August 2021	
Group stage	Matchday 2	Groups G-H	19 May 2021	11–12 September 2021	
Group stage	Matchday 3		19 May 2021	2–3 September 2021	
Group stage	Matchday 4		19 May 2021	4–5 September 2021	
Group stage	Matchday 5		19 May 2021	5–6 October 2021	
Group stage	Matchday 6		19 May 2021	12–13 October 2021	
Playoff	Round of 16		15 October 2021	16–17 November 2021	23–24 November 2021
Playoff	Quarter-finals		15 October 2021	7–8 December 2021	14 December 2021
Playoff	Semi-finals		15 October 2021	4–5 January 2022	11–12 January 2022
Playoff	Final		15 October 2021	1 March 2022	

== Group stage ==
Teams in the 2021–22 Champions Hockey League
Black: Group A; Purple: Group B; Blue: Group C; Red: Group D; Orange: Group E; Green: Group F; White: Group G; Yellow: Group H.

For the group stage, the teams were drawn into 8 groups of 4 teams. Each team played home and away against every other team for a total of six games. The best two teams qualified to the round of 16.

The draw of the group stage took place on 19 May 2021.

=== Pots ===
Due to a scheduling conflict caused by the 2022 Winter Olympics final qualification tournament being held on 26–29 August 2021, eight teams from countries participating in the Olympic qualification (Austria, Denmark, France, Italy, Norway, Poland, Ukraine) were allocated into the pot 5 and drawn into two separate groups of four which did not play their games on the specified dates. There was no league protection for the teams from these two groups. The other 24 teams (from five remaining founding leagues as well as teams from Belarus and the United Kingdom as top two challenger leagues and 2019–20 IIHF Continental Cup winners SønderjyskE Ishockey) were allocated into four pots and drawn by the standard procedure into six groups of four.

Pot 1	Pot 2	Pot 3	Pot 4	Pot 5
(Sweden) Frölunda HC (Sweden) Växjö Lakers (Switzerland) EV Zug (Germany) Eisbären Berlin (Finland) Lukko (Czech Republic) Oceláři Třinec	(Sweden) Rögle BK (Switzerland) HC Lugano (Germany) Adler Mannheim (Finland) HIFK (Czech Republic) HC Sparta Praha (Sweden) Leksands IF	(Switzerland) HC Fribourg-Gottéron (Germany) EHC Red Bull München (Finland) TPS (Czech Republic) BK Mladá Boleslav (Sweden) Skellefteå AIK (Switzerland) Lausanne HC	(Germany) Fischtown Pinguins (Finland) Tappara (Switzerland) ZSC Lions; ~~(Belarus) HC Yunost Minsk~~ (United Kingdom) Cardiff Devils (Denmark) SønderjyskE Ishockey	(Austria) EC KAC (Italy) HC Bolzano (Austria) Red Bull Salzburg (France) Dragons de Rouen (Norway) Frisk Asker Ishockey (Poland) JKH GKS Jastrzębie (Denmark) Rungsted Ishockey (Ukraine) HC Donbass

=== Group A ===
Pos	Team	Pld	W	OTW	OTL	L	GF	GA	GD	Pts	Qualification	SPA	VAX	BRE	TPS
1	(Czech Republic) HC Sparta Praha	6	3	2	0	1	17	10	+7	13	Advance to Playoffs	—	2–1 (OT)	5–2	3–2
2	(Sweden) Växjö Lakers	6	3	0	1	2	14	10	+4	10	Advance to Playoffs	2–1	—	5–0	4–2
3	(Germany) Fischtown Pinguins	6	3	0	0	3	10	15	−5	9		1–2	2–1	—	3–0
4	(Finland) TPS	6	1	0	1	4	10	16	−6	4		2–3 (SO)	3–1	1–2	—

Source: Champions Hockey League

=== Group B ===
Pos	Team	Pld	W	OTW	OTL	L	GF	GA	GD	Pts	Qualification	FRO	ZSC	HIFK	MLA
1	(Sweden) Frölunda HC	6	4	1	0	1	19	13	+6	14	Advance to Playoffs	—	4–3 (OT)	4–1	4–3
2	(Switzerland) ZSC Lions	6	4	0	1	1	16	12	+4	13	Advance to Playoffs	4–2	—	0–3	7–3
3	(Finland) HIFK	6	2	1	0	3	10	9	+1	8		2–3	0–2	—	2–1
4	(Czech Republic) BK Mladá Boleslav	6	0	0	1	5	9	20	−11	1		1–4	0–1	1–2 (OT)	—

Source: Champions Hockey League

=== Group C ===
Pos	Team	Pld	W	OTW	OTL	L	GF	GA	GD	Pts	Qualification	LUK	MAN	LAU	CAR
1	(Finland) Lukko	6	4	0	2	0	22	11	+11	14	Advance to Playoffs	—	5–1	2–3 (OT)	5–2
2	(Germany) Adler Mannheim	6	3	1	0	2	21	13	+8	11	Advance to Playoffs	2–1 (SO)	—	1–3	7–2
3	(Switzerland) Lausanne HC	6	2	1	0	3	11	15	−4	8		0–3	2–5	—	2–0
4	(United Kingdom) Cardiff Devils	6	1	0	0	5	11	26	−15	3		3–6	0–5	4–1	—

Source: Champions Hockey League

=== Group D ===
Pos	Team	Pld	W	OTW	OTL	L	GF	GA	GD	Pts	Qualification	ROG	MUN	ZUG	SON
1	(Sweden) Rögle BK	6	4	1	0	1	23	14	+9	14	Advance to Playoffs	—	4–3	5–3	8–3
2	(Germany) EHC Red Bull München	6	4	0	0	2	25	13	+12	12	Advance to Playoffs	2–1	—	3–4	6–2
3	(Switzerland) EV Zug	6	3	0	1	2	28	19	+9	10		1–2 (OT)	1–6	—	9–3
4	(Denmark) SønderjyskE Ishockey	6	0	0	0	6	11	41	−30	0		2–3	1–5	0–10	—

Source: Champions Hockey League

=== Group E ===
Pos	Team	Pld	W	OTW	OTL	L	GF	GA	GD	Pts	Qualification	TAP	SKE	BER	LUG
1	(Finland) Tappara	6	3	2	0	1	25	18	+7	13	Advance to Playoffs	—	4–2	5–4 (OT)	3–2 (OT)
2	(Sweden) Skellefteå AIK	6	3	0	0	3	22	21	+1	9	Advance to Playoffs	6–1	—	5–3	3–5
3	(Germany) Eisbären Berlin	6	2	0	1	3	21	26	−5	7 (Note: Head-to-head points: Eisbären Berlin 6, HC Lugano 0.)		1–6	3–5	—	6–3
4	(Switzerland) HC Lugano	6	2	0	1	3	20	23	−3	7		3–6	5–1	2–4	—

Source: Champions Hockey League
Rules for classification: Group stage tiebreakers

=== Group F ===
Pos	Team	Pld	W	OTW	OTL	L	GF	GA	GD	Pts	Qualification	FRG	LEK	TRI	SLO
1	(Switzerland) HC Fribourg-Gottéron	6	6	0	0	0	25	9	+16	18	Advance to Playoffs	—	3–0	6–2	5–2
2	(Sweden) Leksands IF	6	4	0	0	2	17	16	+1	12	Advance to Playoffs	2–5	—	3–2	5–3
3	(Czech Republic) Oceláři Třinec	6	2	0	0	4	15	17	−2	6		3–4	1–3	—	3–0
4	(Slovakia) HC Slovan Bratislava	6	0	0	0	6	8	23	−15	0		0–2	2–4	1–4	—

Source: Champions Hockey League

=== Group G ===
Pos	Team	Pld	W	OTW	OTL	L	GF	GA	GD	Pts	Qualification	KAC	ROU	DON	RUN
1	(Austria) EC KAC	6	3	2	0	1	19	9	+10	13	Advance to Playoffs	—	2–1 (OT)	1–2	3–2 (OT)
2	(France) Dragons de Rouen	6	3	0	1	2	15	14	+1	10	Advance to Playoffs	0–4	—	4–3	5–1
3	(Ukraine) HC Donbass	6	2	0	2	2	15	17	−2	8		3–4	2–1	—	2–3 (SO)
4	(Denmark) Rungsted Ishockey	6	0	2	1	3	13	22	−9	5		1–5	2–4	4–3 (OT)	—

Source: Champions Hockey League

=== Group H ===
Pos	Team	Pld	W	OTW	OTL	L	GF	GA	GD	Pts	Qualification	SAL	BOL	JAS	FRI
1	(Austria) Red Bull Salzburg	6	4	1	0	1	23	13	+10	14	Advance to Playoffs	—	3–5	6–1	1–0
2	(Italy) HC Bolzano	6	3	1	2	0	20	13	+7	13	Advance to Playoffs	3–4 (OT)	—	3–1	1–2 (SO)
3	(Poland) JKH GKS Jastrzębie	6	2	0	1	3	17	21	−4	7		2–3	2–3 (SO)	—	4–3
4	(Norway) Frisk Asker Ishockey	6	0	1	0	5	11	24	−13	2		2–6	1–5	3–7	—

Source: Champions Hockey League

=== Group stage tie-breaking criteria ===
Teams were ranked according to points (3 points for a win in regulation time, 2 points for a win in overtime, 1 point for a loss in overtime, 0 points for a loss in regulation time). If two or more teams were tied on points, the following tiebreaking criteria were applied, in the order given, to determine the rankings (see 8.4.4. Tie breaking formula group stage standings):

1. Points in head-to-head matches among the tied teams;
2. Goal difference in head-to-head matches among the tied teams;
3. Goals scored in head-to-head matches among the tied teams;
4. The higher number of goals in one of the matches among the tied teams;
5. The most goals in the two game winning shot series;
6. If more than two teams are tied, head-to-head criteria 1, 2 and 3 are reapplied exclusively to this subset of teams;
7. If more than two teams are tied, and after applying head-to-head criteria 1, 2 and 3, a subset of teams are still tied, goal difference and goals scored then the results between each of the three teams and the closest best-ranked team outside the subset was applied; best-ranked team outside the sub-group was applied;
8. The higher position in the 2019–20 Champions Hockey League club ranking;
9. Goal difference in all group matches;
10. Goals scored in all group matches;
11. Regulation time wins in all group matches;
12. Overtime wins in all group matches;
13. Overtime losses in all group matches.

== Playoffs ==
=== Qualified teams ===
The knockout phase involves the 16 teams which qualify as winners and runners-up of each of the eight groups in the group stage.

Group	Winners (seeded in round of 16 draw)	Runners-up (unseeded in round of 16 draw)
A	(Czech Republic) HC Sparta Praha	(Sweden) Växjö Lakers
B	(Sweden) Frölunda HC	(Switzerland) ZSC Lions
C	(Finland) Lukko	(Germany) Adler Mannheim
D	(Sweden) Rögle BK	(Germany) EHC Red Bull München
E	(Finland) Tappara	(Sweden) Skellefteå AIK
F	(Switzerland) HC Fribourg-Gottéron	(Sweden) Leksands IF
G	(Austria) EC KAC	(France) Dragons de Rouen
H	(Austria) Red Bull Salzburg	(Italy) HC Bolzano

=== Format ===
In each round except the final, the teams played two games and the aggregate score decided which team advanced. As a rule, the first leg was hosted by the team who had the inferior record in the tournament with the second leg being played on the home ice of the other team. If aggregate score was tied, a sudden death overtime followed. If the overtime was scoreless, the team who won the shoot out competition advanced.

The final was played on the home ice of the team who had the better record in the tournament.

=== Bracket ===
The eight group winners and the eight second-placed teams advanced to the round of 16. The teams were divided into two seeding groups and group winners were randomly drawn against runners-up. Teams who had faced each other in the group stage could not be drawn against each other in the round of 16.

Round of 16
1	(Switzerland) HC Fribourg-Gottéron	2	2	4
16	(Germany) EHC Red Bull München	4	3	7
8	(Italy) HC Bolzano	1	—	1
9	(Finland) Lukko	3	—	3
5	(Sweden) Växjö Lakers	2	2	4
12	(Finland) Tappara	2	4	6
4	(France) Dragons de Rouen	3	1	4
13	(Austria) Red Bull Salzburg	0	3	3
6	(Switzerland) ZSC Lions	3	1	4
11	(Sweden) Rögle BK	4	3	7
3	(Sweden) Skellefteå AIK	1	2	3
14	(Czech Republic) HC Sparta Praha	3	1	4
7	(Germany) Adler Mannheim	1	1	2
10	(Sweden) Frölunda HC	10	4	14
2	(Austria) EC KAC	4	1	5
15	(Sweden) Leksands IF	0	8	8

Quarter-finals
(Germany) EHC Red Bull München (OT)	2	2	4
(Finland) Lukko	2	1	3
(Finland) Tappara	3	4	7
(France) Dragons de Rouen	3	0	3
(Sweden) Rögle BK	5	1	6
(Czech Republic) HC Sparta Praha	2	3	5
(Sweden) Frölunda HC	5	3	8
(Sweden) Leksands IF	2	3	5

Semi-finals
(Germany) EHC Red Bull München	—	0	0
(Finland) Tappara	—	3	3
(Sweden) Rögle BK	5	3	8
(Sweden) Frölunda HC	3	1	4

Final
(Finland) Tappara	1
(Sweden) Rögle BK	2

=== Round of 16 ===
The draw for the entire playoff was held on 15 October 2021 in Zürich. The first legs were played on 16 and 17 November with return legs played on 23 and 24 November 2021.

Team 1	Agg.	Team 2	1st leg	2nd leg
HC Fribourg-Gottéron (Switzerland)	4–7	(Germany) EHC Red Bull München	2–4	2–3
HC Bolzano (Italy)	1–3	(Finland) Lukko	1–3	Cancelled (Note: The round of 16 return game between Lukko and HC Bolzano was cancelled as a number of players of Lukko were unavailable due to the COVID-19 protocol and it was decided to take into consideration only the result of the first game.)
Växjö Lakers (Sweden)	4–6	(Finland) Tappara	2–2	2–4
Dragons de Rouen (France)	4–3	(Austria) Red Bull Salzburg	3–0	1–3
ZSC Lions (Switzerland)	4–7	(Sweden) Rögle BK	3–4	1–3
Skellefteå AIK (Sweden)	3–4	(Czech Republic) HC Sparta Praha	1–3	2–1
Adler Mannheim (Germany)	2–14	(Sweden) Frölunda HC	1–10	1–4
EC KAC (Austria)	5–8	(Sweden) Leksands IF	4–0	1–8

==== First Leg ====
16 November 2021; 18:05 CET	Skellefteå AIK (Sweden)	1–3 (0–1, 1–1, 0–1)	(Czech Republic) HC Sparta Praha	Skellefteå Kraft Arena, Skellefteå; Attendance: 2,433

Game reference

Strauss Mann
Goalies
Alexander Salák
Referees:
Milan Zrnić
Trpimir Piragić
Linesmen:
Emil Yletyinen
Tobias Nordlander

	0–1	1:02 – Chlapík (Jeřábek, Moravčík)
Möller (Nilsson, Lindström) (PP) – 24:02	1–1
	1–2	39:46 – Pavelka (Thorell, Sobotka)
	1–3	50:18 – Thorell Sobotka, Kaše)

0 min
Penalties
6 min
28
Shots
17

16 November 2021; 19:00 CET	Växjö Lakers (Sweden)	2–2 (2–1, 0–1, 0–0)	(Finland) Tappara	Vida Arena, Växjö; Attendance: 2,462

Game reference

Adam Åhman
Goalies
Christian Heljanko
Referees:
Robin Šír
René Hradil
Linesmen:
Daniel Persson
Richard Nilsson

	0–1	5:49 – Morley (Henriksson, Austin)
Persson (Holmberg) – 11:03	1–1
Forslund (Claesson, Lycksell) – 18:33	2–1
	2–2	23:12 – Rönni (Henriksson, Seppälä)

4 min
Penalties
4 min
29
Shots
27

16 November 2021; 19:00 CET	EC KAC (Austria)	4–0 (1–0, 1–0, 2–0)	(Sweden) Leksands IF	Stadthalle Klagenfurt, Klagenfurt; Attendance: 1,609

Game reference

Sebastian Dahm
Goalies
Kasimir Kaskisuo
Referees:
Daniel Pražák
Vladimír Pešina
Linesmen:
Elias Seewald
David Nothegger

Koch (Unterweger, Bischofberger) (PP) – 11:11	1–0
Bischofberger (Hundertpfund) – 23:35	2–0
Strong (Hundertpfund, Bischofberger) – 49:50	3–0
Bischofberger (Hundertpfund, Vallant) – 53:31	4–0

10 min
Penalties
10 min
21
Shots
36

16 November 2021; 19:30 CET	Adler Mannheim (Germany)	1–10 (1–2, 0–3, 0–5)	(Sweden) Frölunda HC	SAP Arena, Mannheim; Attendance: 2,968

Game reference

Felix Brückmann
Goalies
Matthew Tomkins
Referees:
Ladislav Smetana
Christian Ofner
Linesmen:
Christopher Hurtik
Andreas Hofer

Rendulic – 6:03	1–0
	1–1	8:01 – (PP) Lundqvist (Lasch, Špaček)
	1–2	11:11 – (PP) Carlsson (Sundström, Lasch)
	1–3	26:36 – (PS) Lasch
	1–4	27:18 – Lasu (Elliott, Lasch)
	1–5	33:26 – (PP) Söderblom (Olsson, Lasch)
	1–6	40:21 – Henriksson (Mursak, Folin)
	1–7	43:33 – Söderblom (Lasch)
	1–8	46:50 – Niederbach (Söderblom, Folin)
	1–9	57:14 – (PP) Sundström (Carlsson, Elliott)
	1–10	58:06 – (SHG) Carlsson (Sundström)

10 min
Penalties
8 min
16
Shots
33

16 November 2021; 19:30 CET	HC Bolzano (Italy)	1–3 (0–2, 1–1, 0–0)	(Finland) Lukko	Eiswelle, Bolzano; Attendance: 2,300

Game reference

Justin Fazio
Goalies
Lassi Lehtinen
Referees:
Daniel Stricker
Miroslav Stolc
Linesmen:
Jaka Gasper Zgonc
Ulrich Pardatscher

	0–1	5:29 – Pooley (Slovacek, Grégoire)
	0–2	11:46 – Saarijärvi (Pooley, Haga)
Halmo (Tauferer) – 31:08	1–2
	1–3	38:18 – Hakulinen (Saarijärvi, Repo)

10 min
Penalties
10 min
24
Shots
34

17 November 2021; 19:30 CET	Rouen Dragons (France)	3–0 (0–0, 1–0, 2–0)	(Austria) Red Bull Salzburg	Centre sportif Guy-Boissière, Rouen; Attendance: 3,279

Game reference

Matija Pintarič
Goalies
Atte Tolvanen
Referees:
Lasse Kopitz
Gordon Schukies
Linesmen:
Nicolas Constantineau
Clément Goncalves

Gilbert (Johnston, Nesa)	1–0
Vigners (Lampérier, Dorion) – 52:18	2–0
Vigners (SHG) – 55:42	3–0

4 min
Penalties
4 min
22
Shots
33

16 November 2021; 20:05 CET	HC Fribourg-Gottéron (Switzerland)	2–4 (1–1, 0–3, 1–0)	(Germany) EHC Red Bull München	BCF Arena, Fribourg; Attendance: 5,039

Game reference

Reto Berra
Goalies
Danny aus den Birken
Referees:
Mikael Nord
Mikael Holm
Linesmen:
Dario Fuchs
Marc-Henri Progin

Mottet – 7:25	1–0
	1–1	16:13 – Schütz (Gogulla, Smith)
	1–2	25:35 – (SHG) Blum (Tiffels, Parkes)
	1–3	35:40 – Tiffels (Parkes, Street)
	1–4	38:51 – Abeltshauser (Ehliz, Ortega)
Desharnais (PS) – 44:28	2–4

8 min
Penalties
10 min
30
Shots
26

16 November 2021; 20:05 CET	ZSC Lions (Switzerland)	3–4 (1–1, 1–2, 1–1)	(Sweden) Rögle BK	Hallenstadion, Zürich; Attendance: 3,016

Game reference

Lukas Flüeler
Goalies
Calle Clang
Referees:
Aleksi Rantala
Marian Rohatsch
Linesmen:
David Obwegeser
Eric Cattaneo

	0–1	17:33 – (PP) Tambellini (Jonsson, Bristedt)
Sigrist (Hollenstein, Krüger) – 17:53	1–1
Hollenstein (Schappi, Diem) – 28:02	2–1
	2–2	35:12 – (PP) Everberg (Tambellini, Bengtsson)
	2–3	38:35 – Tambellini (Jonsson, Bristedt)
Geering (Malgin, Quenneville) – 49:27	3–3
	3–4	59:28 – Jonsson (Tambellini, Bristedt)

8 min
Penalties
4 min
34
Shots
29

==== Second Leg ====
23 November 2021; 18:00 CET	HC Sparta Praha (Czech Republic)	1–2 (1–0, 0–0, 0–2)	(Sweden) Skellefteå AIK	Tipsport Arena, Prague; Attendance: 3,417

Game reference

Matěj Machovský
Goalies
Gustaf Lindvall
Referees:
Michael Tscherrig
Micha Hebeisen
Linesmen:
Jiří Ondráček
Josef Špůr

Řepík (Sobotka, Polášek) – 10:57	1–0
	1–1	41:29 – (EA) Granberg (Karlsson, Hugg)
	1–2	59:38 – (EA) Karlsson (Kühnhackl, Pudas)

6 min
Penalties
6 min
19
Shots
27

HC Sparta Praha won 4–3 on Aggregate.

23 November 2021; 18:00 CET	Tappara (Finland)	4–2 (0–0, 1–2, 3–0)	(Sweden) Växjö Lakers	Hakametsä, Tampere; Attendance: Game was played behind closed doors.

Game reference

Christian Heljanko
Goalies
Janis Kalnins
Referees:
Marc Iwert
André Schrader
Linesmen:
Lauri Nikulainen
Hannu Sormunen

	0–1	27:41 – Aktell (Persson, Nilsson)
Platzer (Kuusela, Rantakari) (PP) – 31:30	1–1
	1–2	38:24 – (PP) Lycksell (Gynge, Holmberg)
Virta (Tuulola, Kuusela) – 43:59	2–2
Levtchi (Jürgens, Merelä)	3–2
Vittasmäki (Rauhala) (SHENG) – 58:24	4–2

8 min
Penalties
8 min
21
Shots
32

Tappara won 6–4 on Aggregate.

23 November 2021; 18:05 CET	Frölunda HC (Sweden)	4–1 (1–0, 1–0, 2–1)	(Germany) Adler Mannheim	Frölundaborgs Isstadion, Gothenburg; Attendance: 1,738

Game reference

Niklas Rubin
Goalies
Dennis Endras
Referees:
Mikko Kaukokari
Joonas Kova
Linesmen:
Andreas Malmqvist
Gustav Jonsson

Söderblom (Edvinsson) – 12:24	1–0
Sundström (Edvinsson, Folin) – 25:28	2–0
	2–1	44:38 – Tosto (Klos)
Söderblom (Sundström, Elliott) – 52:56	3–1
Mursak (Lundqvist, Elliott) – 55:00	4–1

0 min
Penalties
6 min
35
Shots
11

Frölunda HC won 14–2 on Aggregate.

23 November 2021; 18:05 CET	Rögle BK (Sweden)	3–1 (0–0, 1–1, 2–0)	(Switzerland) ZSC Lions	Catena Arena, Ängelholm; Attendance: 3,147

Game reference

Christoffer Rifalk
Goalies
Ludovic Waeber
Referees:
Lassi Heikkinen
Kristian Vikman
Linesmen:
Ludvig Lundgren
Andreas Svensson

	0–1	33:11 – Weber (Diem, Krüger)
Larsson (McKiernan, Lyrenäs) (PP) – 36:50	1–1
Everberg (Tambellini, Bengtsson) (PP) – 52:55	2–1
Edström (Brithen, Jonsson) (ENG) – 59:24	3–1

12 min
Penalties
16 min
30
Shots
37

Rögle BK won 7–4 on Aggregate.

23 November 2021; 19:00 CET	Leksands IF (Sweden)	8–1 (3–0, 2–0, 3–1)	(Austria) EC KAC	Tegera Arena, Leksand; Attendance: 2,365

Game reference

Axel Brage
Goalies
Sebastian Dahm
Referees:
Riku Brander
Aaro Brännare
Linesmen:
Daniel Persson
Peter Almerstedt

Rosèn (Kloos) – 1:34	1–0
Rosèn (Camper, Zackrisson) (PP) – 8:49	2–0
Heineman (Kloos, Själin) (PP) – 12:27	3–0
Karlsson (Själin, Kloos) (PP) – 32:58	4–0
Caito (Camper, Zackrisson) (PP 5 on 3) – 36:12	5–0
	5–1	46:24 – Haudum (Hundertpfund)
Heineman (Kloos, Ashton) – 49:49	6–1
Heineman (Camper, Caito) – 58:10	7–1
Camper (Veronneau) (ENG) – 59:05	8–1

4 min
Penalties
14 min
50
Shots
21

Leksands won 8–5 on aggregate.

23 November 2021; 18:00 CET	Lukko (Finland)	Cancelled; NA	(Italy) HC Bolzano	Kivikylän Areena, Rauma; Attendance: NA

Game reference
NA	Goalies	NA	Referees: Jakub Šindel; Vladimír Pešina; Linesmen: Markus Hägerström; Tommi Niittylä

Lukko won 3–1 on Aggregate.
Lukko vs HC Bolzano: The round of 16 return game between Lukko and HC Bolzano was cancelled as a number of players of Lukko were unavailable due to the COVID-19 protocol and it was decided to take into consideration only the result of the first game.

24 November 2021; 18:00 CET	EHC Red Bull München (Germany)	3–2 (0–0, 0–0, 3–2)	(Switzerland) HC Fribourg-Gottéron	Olympia Eishalle, Munich; Attendance: 986

Game reference

Danny aus den Birken
Goalies
Reto Berra
Referees:
Milan Zrnić
Christian Ofner
Linesmen:
Tobias Schwenk
Marius Wölzmüller

	0–1	41:20 – DiDomenico (Schmid, Furrer
	0–2	42:22 – Walser (Brodin)
Parkes (Street, Danny aus den Birken) – 43:55	1–2
Redmond (Ehliz, Hager) – 52:49	2–2
Gogulla (Schütz) (ENG) – 59:48	3–2

6 min
Penalties
8 min
32
Shots
18

EHC Red Bull München won 7–4 on aggregate.

24 November 2021; 20:20 CET	Red Bull Salzburg (Austria)	3–1 (1–0, 1–0, 1–1)	(France) Rouen Dragons	Eisarena Salzburg, Salzburg; Attendance: Game was played behind closed doors.

Game reference

Atte Tolvanen
Goalies
Matija Pintarič
Referees:
Kristijan Nikolić
Christoph Sternat
Linesmen:
Elias Seewald
Simon Riecken

Raffl (Järvinen, Pallestrang) (PP) – 15:58	1–0
Raffl (Kanzig, Heinrich) – 35:52	2–0
Järvinen (Raffl, Schreier) – 49:38	3–0
	3–1	54:48 – Vigners (Yeo, Caron)

6 min
Penalties
4 min
54
Shots
28

Dragons de Rouen won 4–3 on aggregate.

Order of legs reversed after original draw.

=== Quarter-finals ===
First legs were played on 7 December, return legs were played on 14 December 2021.

Team 1	Agg.	Team 2	1st leg	2nd leg
Lukko (Finland)	3–4 (OT)	(Germany) EHC Red Bull München	2–2	1–2
Tappara (Finland)	7–3	(France) Dragons de Rouen	3–3	4–0
HC Sparta Praha (Czech Republic)	5–6	(Sweden) Rögle BK	2–5	3–1
Leksands IF (Sweden)	5–8	(Sweden) Frölunda HC	2–5	3–3

==== First Leg ====
7 December 2021; 18:00 CET	HC Sparta Praha (Czech Republic)	2–5 (1–1, 1–3, 0–1)	Rögle BK (Sweden)	Tipsport Arena, Prague; Attendance: 1,000

Game reference

Matěj Machovský
Goalies
Calle Clang
Referees:
Christian Ofner
Christoph Sternat
Linesmen:
Daniel Hynek
Jiří Ondráček

Thorell (Horák, Řepík) – 1:11	1–0
	1–1	19:55 – (PP) Bristedt (Jonsson, Tambellini)
	1–2	25:53 – Sund (Kelleher)
	1–3	26:22 – Tambellini (Jonsson, Gelinas)
Jeřábek (Sobotka, Buchtele) – 36:13	2–3
	2–4	39:31 – Johannesson (Ferguson, Everberg)
	2–5	45:23 – Jonsson (Larsson, Gelinas)

6 min
Penalties
4 min
23
Shots
29

7 December 2021; 18:00 CET	Tappara (Finland)	3–3 (2–0, 1–2, 0–1)	(France) Rouen Dragons	Nokia Arena, Tampere; Attendance: 3,874

Game reference

Christian Heljanko
Goalies
Matija Pintarič
Referees:
Vladimír Pešina
Jakub Šindel
Linesmen:
Tommi Niittylä
Hannu Sormunen

Platzer (Rantakari, Merelä) (PP) – 6:09	1–0
Merelä (Levtchi, Rauhala) – 17:14	2–0
	2–1	28:04 (PP) – Lampérier (Chakiachvili, Johnston)
	2–2	31:30 – (PP) Vigners (Caron, Flood)
Tanus (Rantakari, Platzer) (PP) – 34:01	3–2
	3–3	54:01 – Johnston (Flood

4 min
Penalties
8 min
43
Shots
12

7 December 2021; 18:00 CET	Lukko (Finland)	2–2 (0–0, 2–0, 0–2)	(Germany) EHC Red Bull München	Kivikylän Areena, Rauma; Attendance: 953

Game reference

Artem Zagidulin
Goalies
Danny aus den Birken
Referees:
Mark Lemelin
Daniel Stricker
Linesmen:
Markus Hagerström
Lauri Nikulainen

Nyman (Ilomäki, Pooley) – 24:25	1–0
Piipponen (Haga, Saarijärvi) – 39:34	2–0
	2–1	43:37 – Tiffels (Mauer, Blum)
	2–2	53:50 – Parkes (Seidenberg, Street)

8 min
Penalties
10 min
21
Shots
27

7 December 2021; 19:00 CET	Leksands IF (Sweden)	2–5 (2–2, 0–0, 0–3)	(Sweden) Frölunda HC	Tegera Arena, Leksand; Attendance: 2,011

Game reference

Axel Brage
Goalies
Matthew Tomkins
Referees:
Mikael Nord
Tobias Björk
Linesmen:
Tobias Nordlander
Daniel Persson

Veronneau (Camper, Zackrisson) – 9:28	1–0
	1–1	10:02 – Carlsson (Olsson, Friberg)
	1–2	16:40 – Olsson (Sundström, Niederbach)
Bichsel (Thomas, Zackrisson) – 18:17	2–2
	2–3	53:04 – Elliott (Söderblom, Niederbach)
	2–4	54:57 – Carlsson (Grönlund, Friberg)
	2–5	56:06 – Söderblom (Friberg, Folin)

2 min
Penalties
2 min
36
Shots
25

==== Second Leg ====
14 December 2021; 19:00 CET	Frölunda HC (Sweden)	3–3 (1–1, 1–1, 1–1)	(Sweden) Leksands IF	Frölundaborgs Isstadion, Gothenburg; Attendance: 3,575

Game reference

Matthew Tomkins
Goalies
Axel Brage
Referees:
Mikael Holm
Linus Öhlund
Linesmen:
Andreas Svensson
Gustav Jonsson

	0–1	6:47 – Ruohomaa (Caito, Ashton)
Lasch (Söderblom, Špaček) (PP) – 16:53	1–1
	1–2	26:53 – Noren (Zackrisson, Camper)
Friberg (SHG) – 35:06	2–2
	2–3	46:23 – Åman (Karlsson, Zackrisson)
Söderblom (Lasch, Špaček) (PP) – 59:57	3–3

6 min
Penalties
14 min
20
Shots
43

Frölunda HC won 8–5 on Aggregate.

14 December 2021; 19:00 CET	Rögle BK (Sweden)	1–3 (0–0, 0–0, 1–3)	(Czech Republic) HC Sparta Praha	Catena Arena, Ängelholm; Attendance: 3,442

Game reference

Christoffer Rifalk
Goalies
Alexander Salák
Referees:
Mikko Kaukokari
Kristian Vikman
Linesmen:
Ludvig Lundgren
Anders Nyqvist

Ferguson (Gelinas, Kelleher) (PP) – 43:48	1–0
	1–1	46:44 – Forman (Thorell, Matushkin)
	1–2	54:24 – (EAG) Chlapík (Jandus, Pavelka)
	1–3	58:37 – (EAG) Chlapík (Jandus, Polášek)

6 min
Penalties
12 min
20
Shots
26

Rögle BK won 6–5 on Aggregate.

14 December 2021; 19:30 CET	Dragons de Rouen (France)	0–4 (0–0, 0–2, 0–2)	(Finland) Tappara	Centre sportif Guy-Boissière, Rouen; Attendance: 3,016

Game reference

Matija Pintarič
Goalies
Christian Heljanko
Referees:
Lasse Kopitz
Gordon Schukies
Linesmen:
Nicolas Constantineau
Clément Goncalves

0–1	20:55 – (PP) Platzer (Ranrakari, Tanus)
0–2	23:29 – Salonen (Puhakka, Kinnunen)
0–3	56:37 – (ENG) Seppälä (Puhakka)
0–4	58:29 – (ENG) Bertrand (Kuusela)

16 min
Penalties
6 min
19
Shots
52

Tappara won 7–3 on Aggregate.

14 December 2021; 20:15 CET	EHC Red Bull München (Germany)	2–1 (OT) (0–0, 1–1, 0–0) (OT 1–0)	(Finland) Lukko	Olympia Eishalle, Munich; Attendance: Game was behind Closed Doors.

Game reference

Danny aus den Birken
Goalies
Lassi Lehtinen
Referees:
Christoph Sternat
Trpimir Piragić
Linesmen:
Tobias Schwenk
Marius Wölzmüller

	0–1	32:31 – Repo
Tiffels (Boyle) – 38:24	1–1
Schütz (Street, Blum) – 62:25	2–1

2 min
Penalties
10 min
32
Shots
21

Red Bull München won 4–3 in Overtime on Aggregate.

=== Semi-finals ===
First legs were played on 4 January, return legs were played on 11 January and 1 February 2022.

Team 1	Agg.	Team 2	1st leg	2nd leg
EHC Red Bull München (Germany)	0–3	(Finland) Tappara	Cancelled (Note: The first semi-final game between EHC Red Bull München and Tappara was cancelled as one player of EHC Red Bull München was unavailable due to the COVID-19 protocol.)	0–3 (Note: The second semi-final game between Tappara and EHC Red Bull München was originally cancelled due to restrictions related to COVID-19 but was later rescheduled to be played on 25 January 2022 instead of 11 January 2022. On 20 January 2022 the game was postponed once again as several team members of Tappara tested positive for COVID-19. On 24 January 2022 the game was scheduled to be played on 1 February 2022.)
Rögle BK (Sweden)	8–4	(Sweden) Frölunda HC	5–3	3–1

==== First Leg ====
4 January 2022; 19:00 CET	Rögle BK (Sweden)	5–3 (0–1, 2–0, 3–2)	(Sweden) Frölunda HC	Catena Arena, Ängelholm; Attendance: 1,995

Game reference

Christoffer Rifalk
Goalies
Matthew Tomkins
Referees:
Anssi Salonen
Kristian Vikman
Linesmen:
Anders Nyqvist
Gustav Jonsson

	0–1	18:38 – (PP) Sundström (Lundqvist, Carlsson)
Brithen (Lyrenäs, Larsson) – 30:32	1–1
Johannesson (Sjögren, Jonsson) – 34:18	2–1
Brithen (Lyrenäs, Gelinas) – 41:27	3–1
Bristedt – 45:04	4–1
	4–2	46:29 – Lasu (Lasch, Rosseli Olsen)
	4–3	48:41 – Lasch Sundström)
Brithen (Everberg, Bristedt) – 49:47	5–3

6 min
Penalties
4 min
36
Shots
38

4 January 2022; 20:30 CET	EHC Red Bull München (Germany)	NA; NA	(Finland) Tappara	Olympia Eishalle, Munich; Attendance: NA

Game reference
NA	Goalies	NA	Referees: Kristijan Nikolić; Christoph Sternat; Linesmen: Jonas Merten; Marius Wölzmüller
NA / Goals / NA			Referees: Kristijan Nikolić; Christoph Sternat; Linesmen: Jonas Merten; Marius Wölzmüller
NA min	Penalties	NA min	Referees: Kristijan Nikolić; Christoph Sternat; Linesmen: Jonas Merten; Marius Wölzmüller
NA	Shots	NA	Referees: Kristijan Nikolić; Christoph Sternat; Linesmen: Jonas Merten; Marius Wölzmüller

Game was cancelled as one player of EHC Red Bull München was unavailable due to the COVID-19 protocol.

==== Second Leg ====
11 January 2022; 19:00 CET	Frölunda HC (Sweden)	1–3 (0–1, 0–1, 1–1)	(Sweden) Rögle BK	Frölundaborg, Gothenburg; Attendance: 1,218

Game reference

Matthew Tomkins
Goalies
Christoffer Rifalk
Referees:
Linus Öhlund
Mikael Nord
Linesmen:
Andreas Malmqvist
Ludvig Lundgren

	0–1	0:32 – Bengtsson (Ferguson, Sjödin)
	0–2	35:18 – (PP) Everberg (Jonsson, Tambellini)
	0–3	50:36 – (SHENG) Larsson
Johansson (Sundström, Carlsson) – 56:10	1–3

4 min
Penalties
12 min
39
Shots
24

Rögle BK won 8–4 on Aggregate.

1 February 2022; 18:00 CET	Tappara (Finland)	3–0 (1–0, 0–0, 2–0)	(Germany) EHC Red Bull München	Nokia Arena, Tampere; Attendance: Game was Behind Closed Doors

Game reference

Christian Heljanko
Goalies
Henrik Haukeland
Referees:
Daniel Stricker
Mark Lemelin
Linesmen:
Tommi Niittylä
Hannu Sormunen

Kuusela (Levtchi, Rantakari) (PP) – 4:13	1–0
Luoto (Rantakari, Tanus) – 51:47	2–0
Kuusela (Rantakari, Levtchi) (PP) – 53:29	3–0

10 min
Penalties
8 min
34
Shots
25

Tappara won 3–0 on Aggregate.

=== Final ===
1 March 2022; 19:00 (UTC+1)	Rögle BK (Sweden)	2–1 (1–0, 1–0, 0–1)	(Finland) Tappara	Catena Arena, Ängelholm; Attendance: 4,950

Game reference

Christoffer Rifalk
Goalies
Christian Heljanko
Referees:
(Czech Republic) Robin Šír
(Czech Republic) Vladimír Pešina
Linesmen:
(Austria) Simon Riecken
(Slovakia) Oto Durmis

Zaar (Bengtsson, Jonsson) – 02:53	1–0
Zaar (Tambellini, Stål Lyrenäs) (PP) – 29:22	2–0
	2–1	44:23 – Merelä (Morley, Levtchi)

2 min
Penalties
2 min
29
Shots
25

== Statistics ==
=== Scoring leaders ===
The following players are leading the league in points.

Player	Team	GP	G	A	PTS	PIM	+/–	GWG	PPG	SHG	SOG	S%
(United States) Ryan Lasch	(Sweden) Frölunda HC	12	4	14	18	2	+5	0	2	0	23	17.39%
(Germany) Frederik Tiffels	(Germany) Red Bull München	10	8	6	14	0	+9	2	0	0	30	26.67%
(Sweden) Ludvig Larsson	(Sweden) Rögle BK	13	5	9	14	8	+1	0	3	1	21	23.81%
(Canada) Ben Street	(Germany) Red Bull München	10	3	10	13	2	+11	1	2	0	17	17.65%
(Canada) Adam Tambellini	(Sweden) Rögle BK	11	5	8	13	0	+5	2	3	0	26	19.23%
(Sweden) Patrik Carlsson	(Sweden) Frölunda HC	12	7	6	13	2	0	2	2	2	23	30.43%
(Finland) Kristian Kuusela	(Finland) Tappara	12	2	11	13	0	+5	1	2	0	20	10.00%
(Sweden) Lucas Ekeståhl-Jonsson	(Sweden) Rögle BK	13	2	11	13	4	+2	0	1	0	19	10.53%
(Canada) Trevor Parkes	(Germany) Red Bull München	11	6	6	12	16	+9	1	3	0	24	25.00%
(Sweden) Leon Bristedt	(Sweden) Rögle BK	12	3	9	12	14	+8	1	1	0	12	25.00%

=== Leading goaltenders ===
The following goaltenders are leading the league in save percentage, provided that they have played at least 40% of their team's minutes.

Player	Team	GP	W	L	SV	GA	SV%	GAA	SO	MIN
(Canada) Connor Hughes	(Switzerland) HC Fribourg-Gottéron	5	4	0	126	4	96,92%	0,94	2	255
(Finland) Lassi Lehtinen	(Finland) Lukko	5	3	2	111	6	94,87%	1,18	1	305
(Czech Republic) Alexander Salák	(Czech Republic) HC Sparta Praha	6	4	1	159	9	94,64%	1,58	0	357
(Slovenia) Matija Pintarič	(France) Dragons de Rouen	10	4	5	388	22	94,63%	2,21	1	597
(United States) Kevin Boyle	(Italy) HC Bolzano	4	3	1	145	9	94,16%	2,25	0	240

=== Home Game and Overall ===
As of 1 March 2022

Pos.	Team	Regular season		Playoffs		Overall			2019–20 average
Pos.	Team	Matches	Attendance	Matches	Attendance	Matches	Total	Average	2019–20 average
1	(Ukraine) HC Donbass	3	15,583	0	–	3	15,583	5,194	–
2	(Germany) Adler Mannheim	3	12,243	1	2,968	4	15,211	3,803	7,045
3	(Switzerland) HC Fribourg-Gottéron	3	8,794	1	5,039	4	13,833	3,458	–
4	(Switzerland) Lausanne HC	3	8,855	0	–	3	8,855	2,952	–
5	(France) Dragons de Rouen	3	8,422	2	6,295	5	14,717	2,943	–
6	(Czech Republic) HC Sparta Praha	3	9,812	2	4,417	5	14,229	2,846	–
7	(Switzerland) EV Zug	3	7,707	0	–	3	7,707	2,569	4,263
8	(Sweden) Rögle BK	3	3,849	4	13,534	7	17,383	2,483	–
9	(Sweden) Leksands IF	3	7,639	2	4,376	5	12,015	2,403	–
10	(Wales) Cardiff Devils	3	7,041	0	—	3	7,041	2,347	2,669
11	(Switzerland) ZSC Lions	3	6,111	1	3,016	4	9,127	2,282	–
12	(Switzerland) HC Lugano	3	6,660	0	–	3	6,660	2,220	–
13	(Germany) Fischtown Pinguins	3	6,569	0	—	3	6,569	2,190	–
14	(Slovakia) Slovan Bratislava	3	5,797	0	—	3	5,797	1,932	–
15	(Sweden) Växjö Lakers	3	5,019	1	2,462	4	7,481	1,870	–
16	(Germany) Eisbären Berlin	3	5,418	0	–	3	5,418	1,806	–
17	(Sweden) Frölunda HC	3	3,761	3	6,531	6	10,292	1,715	3,494
18	(Czech Republic) Oceláři Třinec	3	4,960	0	–	3	4,960	1,653	3,848
19	(Sweden) Skellefteå AIK	3	4,131	1	2,433	4	6,564	1,641	2,075
20	(Finland) HIFK	3	4,850	0	—	3	4,850	1,617	–
21	(Austria) EC KAC	3	4,783	1	1,609	4	6,392	1,598	3,307
22	(Italy) HC Bolzano	3	3,757	1	2,300	4	6,057	1,514	–
23	(Czech Republic) BK Mladá Boleslav	3	3,969	0	–	3	3,969	1,323	–
24	(Finland) Tappara	3	3,909	3*	3,874	6	7,783	1,297	4,121
25	(Denmark) SønderjyskE Ishockey	3	3,778	0	—	3	3,778	1,259	–
26	(Finland) Lukko	3	3,405	1	953	4	4,358	1,090	–
27	(Denmark) Rungsted Seier Capital	3	3,006	0	—	3	3,006	1,002	1,023
28	(Germany) Red Bull München	3	3,852	2	986*	5	4,838	968	3,354
29	(Finland) TPS	3	2,863	0	–	3	2,863	954	–
30	(Poland) JKH GKS Jastrzębie	3	2,636	0	—	3	2,636	879	–
31	(Austria) Red Bull Salzburg	3	2,828	1	0*	4	2,828	707	–
32	(Norway) Frisk Asker	3	2,031	0	—	3	2,031	677	1,366
Tournament total		96	184,038	27	60,793	123	244,831	1,990	3,324

Source: Champions Hockey League.
