= Piipponen =

Piipponen is a surname. Notable people with the surname include:

- Samuli Piipponen (born 1993), Finnish professional ice hockey defenceman
- Tapio Piipponen (born 1957), Finnish biathlete
- Topi Piipponen (born 1997), Finnish professional ice hockey player
