= Dennis Everberg =

Swedish ice hockey player (born 1991)

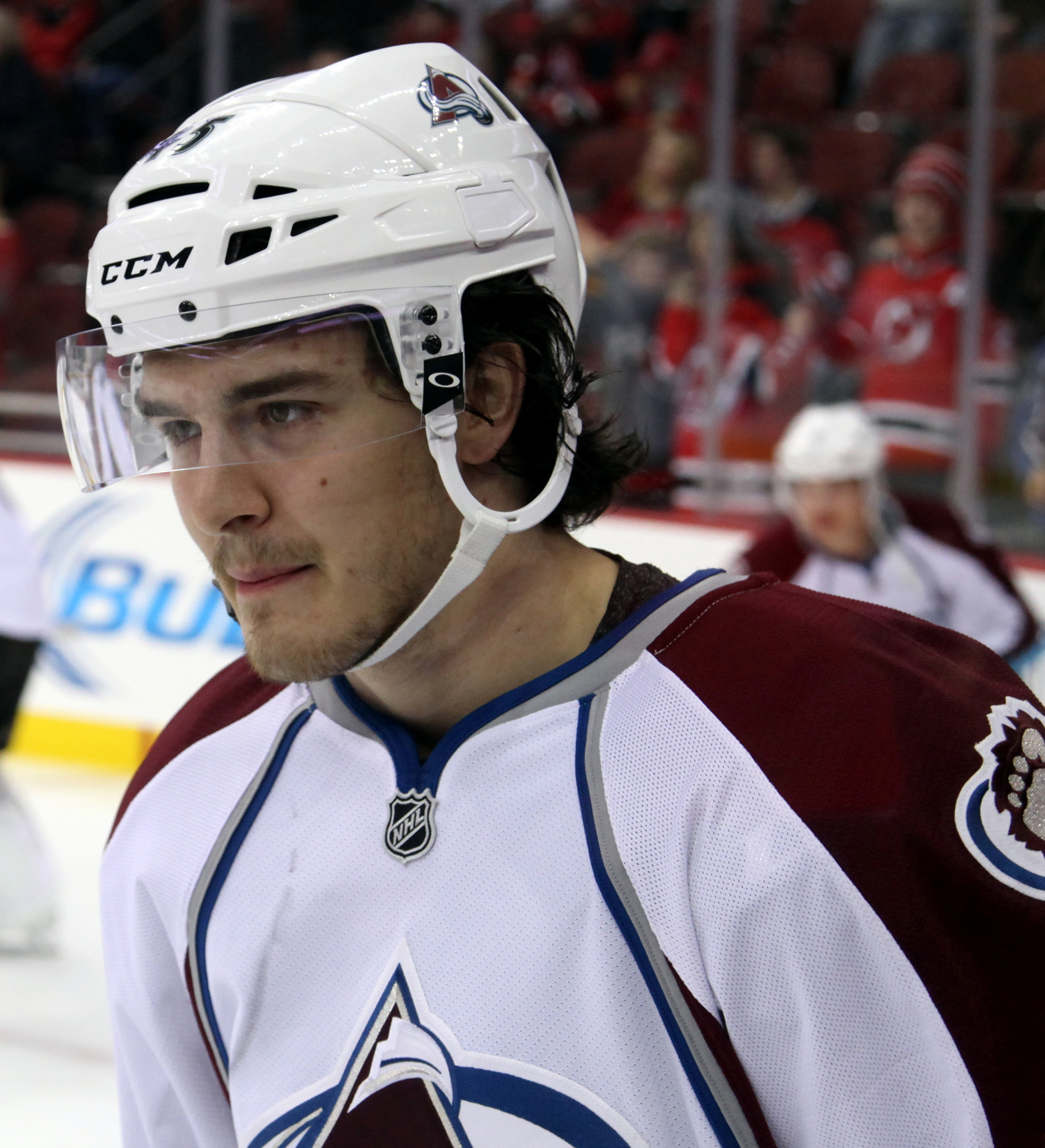
- Everberg in November 2014
- Born: 31 December 1991 (age 34) Västerås, Sweden
- Height: 6 ft 4 in (193 cm)
- Weight: 209 lb (95 kg; 14 st 13 lb)
- Position: Winger
- Shoots: Left
- SHL team Former teams: Rögle BK; Colorado Avalanche; Växjö Lakers; Avangard Omsk; Neftekhimik Nizhnekamsk; EV Zug
- National team: Sweden
- NHL draft: Undrafted
- Playing career: 2009–present

Dennis Everberg (born 31 December 1991) is a Swedish professional ice hockey player who is a winger for Rögle BK of the Swedish Hockey League (SHL). He has played in the National Hockey League (NHL) with the Colorado Avalanche.

== Playing career ==
Everberg played as a youth with Västerås IK before joining Swedish professional club, Rögle BK. In the 2009–10 season, Everberg made his senior debut with Rögle in the Elitserien, appearing in 12 games, collecting a goal and an assist. On 8 May 2010, Everberg was signed to a two-year extension to further develop within Rögle BK.

In the following 2010–11 season, with a relegated Rögle returning to the HockeyAllsvenskan, Everberg featured more prominently with the senior side, contributing with five goals and 12 points in 41 games. Everberg was hampered by a shoulder injury that required surgery early in the 2011–12 season. Upon his eventual return in February, Everberg's developing power forward role became influential in promoting Rögle BK back to the Elitserien. He scored two goals and 6 points in 10 games in the postseason.

As one of Rögle's strongest players, he was re-signed to a further two-year extension on 8 May 2012. In the 2012–13 season, Everberg played his first full season in the Elitserien. Used primarily in a depth role, Everberg scored a modest five goals and 8 points in 55 games with lowly Rögle. In failing to maintain their SHL status, Everberg was relied upon by Rögle in the HockeyAllsvenskan during the 2013–14 season. As one of the team's biggest forwards, Everberg scored a team-leading 17 goals in 47 games, helping the club finish first in the SHL qualifiers. Everberg finished with eight goals in 16 games as the club finished third in promotion to remain in the HockeyAllsvenskan.

Under the influence of sporting director Anders Carlsson's former scouting links to the Colorado Avalanche, Everberg was signed to his first North American contract, agreeing to a two-year entry-level contract with the Avalanche on 28 May 2014. After making a strong impression at the Avalanche's 2014 training camp with his size and skating ability, Everberg surprisingly made the roster to begin the 2014–15 season. He made his NHL debut in an opening night defeat to the Minnesota Wild on 9 October 2014. Upon recall from AHL affiliate, the Lake Erie Monsters, he scored his first NHL goal with the Avalanche on 2 November 2014 against the Anaheim Ducks. With injuries plaguing the Avalanche, Everberg took advantage in securing a checking line role. Towards the conclusion of the regular season, Everberg suffered a shoulder injury against the Nashville Predators on 7 April 2015, which required surgery with a 6-month recovery period. Everberg completed his first North American season with three goals and 12 points in 55 games.

Everberg recovered for the Avalanche's 2015 training camp; however, he was limited in play after an early injury in the preseason. He was the last cut sent to begin the 2015–16 season with new AHL affiliate, the San Antonio Rampage. On the Rampage's top scoring line, Everberg found early success, contributing with 5 points in 3 games before he was recalled to the Avalanche on 22 October 2015. Everberg made his season debut against the Columbus Blue Jackets on 24 October and appeared in 15 scoreless games in a fourth-line role. Having passed the games limit that exempted waiver eligibility, Everberg cleared before returning to the San Antonio Rampage on 27 November 2015.

As an impending restricted free agent at season's end, Everberg opted not to sign with Colorado and return to Sweden in signing a two-year contract with Växjö Lakers of the SHL on 6 May 2016 In the opening game of the 2016–17 season, Everberg made an immediate impact in his return to the SHL, scoring the opening goal and adding another in a 5–2 victory over former club, Rögle BK, on 22 September 2016. Everberg continued his scoring pace throughout the season, finishing second on the club with 37 points in 52 games.

In the off-season, Everberg opted to use his KHL release clause in order to forgo the final year of his contract with Växjö. On 18 May 2017, Everberg agreed to a lucrative one-year deal with Russian club, Avangard Omsk of the KHL. In the 2017–18 season, Everberg initially struggled to find his footing within Omsk, registering just 9 points in 34 games. On 11 December 2017, he was traded by Avangard to Neftekhimik Nizhnekamsk in exchange for fellow import, Chad Rau. Everberg instantly provided a spark with Nizhnekamsk, playing out the regular season to record five goals in just 16 games.

With the ambition to re-establish his NHL career, Everberg left the KHL as a free agent and agreed to a one-year, two-way contract with the Winnipeg Jets on 1 July 2018. On 13 November, the Jets placed Everberg on waivers with the intent to terminate his contract. On 14 November, he signed with EV Zug of the Swiss National League (NL) for the remained of the 2018–19 season. Everberg quickly adapted with Zug, regaining his scoring touch in contributing with 12 goals and 28 points in just 31 games. He continued his output in the playoffs, notching 8 points in 10 games.

As a free agent in the off-season, Everberg opted to return to his roots, signing a five-year contract with original Swedish club, Rögle BK of the SHL, on 23 April 2019. On 20 December 2021, he was signed to a three-year contract extension by Rögle BK.

== International play ==
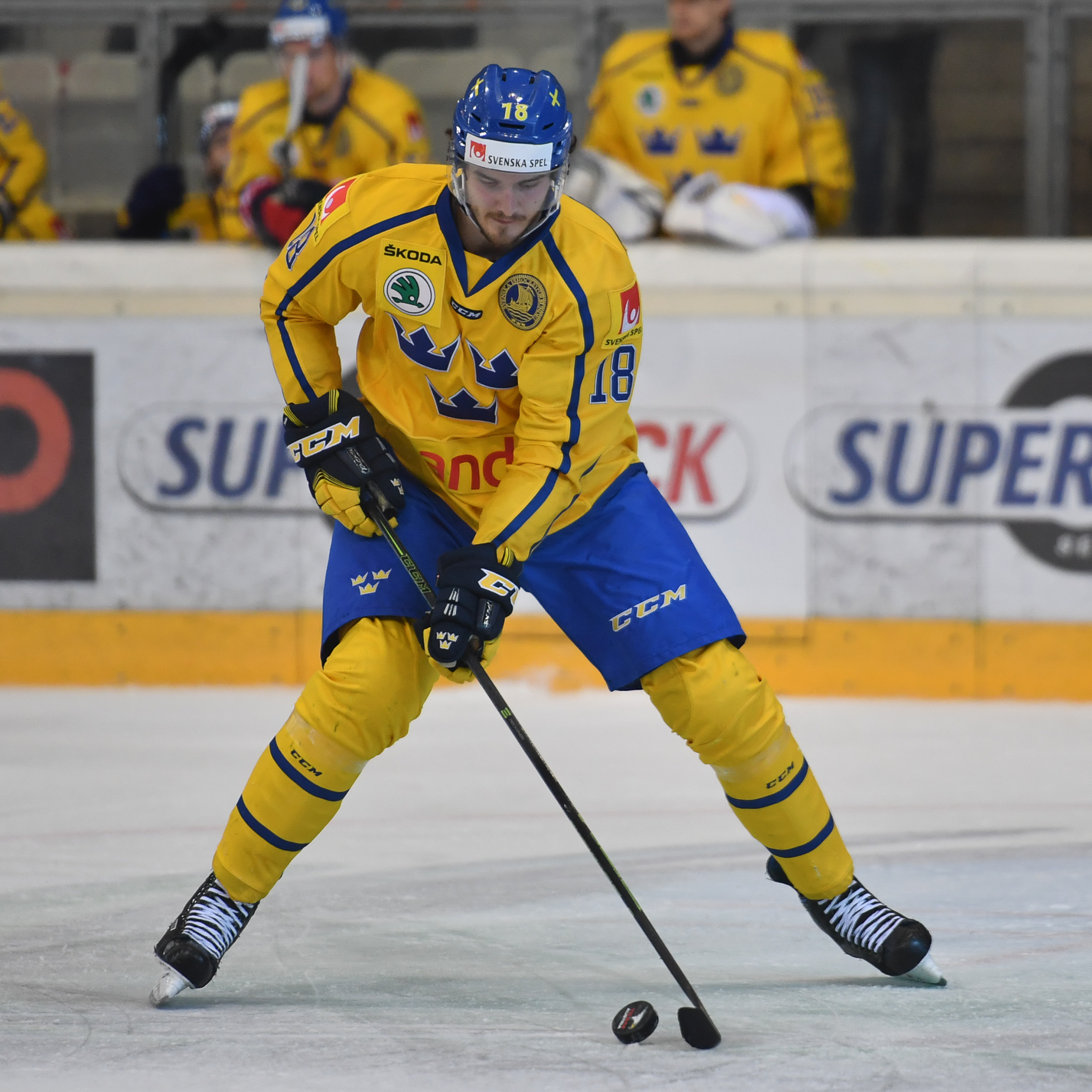

Medal record

Men's ice hockey

Representing Sweden

World Championships
Gold medal – first place	2017 Germany/France	
Gold medal – first place	2018 Denmark	

Everberg, as a late bloomer, made his first appearance for Sweden at the international stage at the senior level of the Euro Hockey Tour during the 2016–17 season. He remained on the pre-tournament squad in preparation for the 2017 World Championship. Despite initially being left of the final roster for the tournament, Everberg was later added and made his debut in an 8–1 round-robin victory against Italy on 12 May 2017. He scored his first goal, the game-winner, and added an assist in a 4–2 victory over Slovakia on 16 May. In helping Sweden capture the gold medal, Everberg completed the tournament scoring two goals and four assists in six games.

During the 2017–18 season, with the exclusion of NHL contracted players, Everberg was selected to represent Sweden at the 2018 Winter Olympics. Used in a checking-line role, Everberg contributed with two points in four games in a fifth-place finish.

== Career statistics ==
=== Regular season and playoffs ===
			Regular season					Playoffs
Season	Team	League	GP	G	A	Pts	PIM	GP	G	A	Pts	PIM
2007–08	Rögle BK	J18	24	3	4	7	49	—	—	—	—	—
2008–09	Rögle BK	J18	12	2	7	9	36	—	—	—	—	—
2009–10	Rögle BK	J20	36	6	12	18	55	2	1	0	1	2
2009–10	Rögle BK	SEL	12	1	1	2	6	—	—	—	—	—
2010–11	Rögle BK	J20	18	4	2	6	54	1	1	1	2	2
2010–11	Rögle BK	Allsv	41	5	7	12	18	8	0	0	0	2
2011–12	Rögle BK	J20	3	0	4	4	0	—	—	—	—	—
2011–12	Rögle BK	Allsv	5	0	0	0	0	10	2	4	6	0
2012–13	Rögle BK	SEL	55	5	3	8	47	—	—	—	—	—
2013–14	Rögle BK	Allsv	47	17	17	34	30	16	8	3	11	12
2014–15	Colorado Avalanche	NHL	55	3	9	12	10	—	—	—	—	—
2014–15	Lake Erie Monsters	AHL	12	5	2	7	4	—	—	—	—	—
2015–16	San Antonio Rampage	AHL	54	15	25	40	42	—	—	—	—	—
2015–16	Colorado Avalanche	NHL	15	0	0	0	0	—	—	—	—	—
2016–17	Växjö Lakers	SHL	52	18	19	37	53	6	0	3	3	27
2017–18	Avangard Omsk	KHL	34	6	3	9	20	—	—	—	—	—
2017–18	Neftekhimik Nizhnekamsk	KHL	16	5	2	7	6	5	0	2	2	8
2018–19	Manitoba Moose	AHL	11	0	1	1	4	—	—	—	—	—
2018–19	EV Zug	NL	31	12	16	28	58	10	4	4	8	14
2019–20	Rögle BK	SHL	43	16	16	32	38	—	—	—	—	—
2020–21	Rögle BK	SHL	44	17	15	32	34	12	3	3	6	8
2021–22	Rögle BK	SHL	45	16	18	34	49	13	3	4	7	6
2022–23	Rögle BK	SHL	21	3	7	10	6	8	2	0	2	6
2023–24	Rögle BK	SHL	40	5	9	14	20	15	3	8	11	35
2024–25	Rögle BK	SHL	44	13	9	22	24	2	0	1	1	2
2025–26	Rögle BK	SHL	48	9	7	16	18	13	2	4	6	10
SHL totals			404	103	104	207	295	69	13	23	36	94
NHL totals			70	3	9	12	10	—	—	—	—	—

=== International ===
Year	Team	Event	Result	GP	G	A	Pts	PIM
2017	Sweden	WC	1st place, gold medalist(s)	6	2	1	3	0
2018	Sweden	OG	5th	4	1	1	2	4
2018	Sweden	WC	1st place, gold medalist(s)	10	1	1	2	2
2022	Sweden	OG	4th	6	0	0	0	4
2023	Sweden	WC	6th	7	3	0	3	2
Senior totals				33	7	3	10	12
