= Otso Rantakari =

Finnish ice hockey player

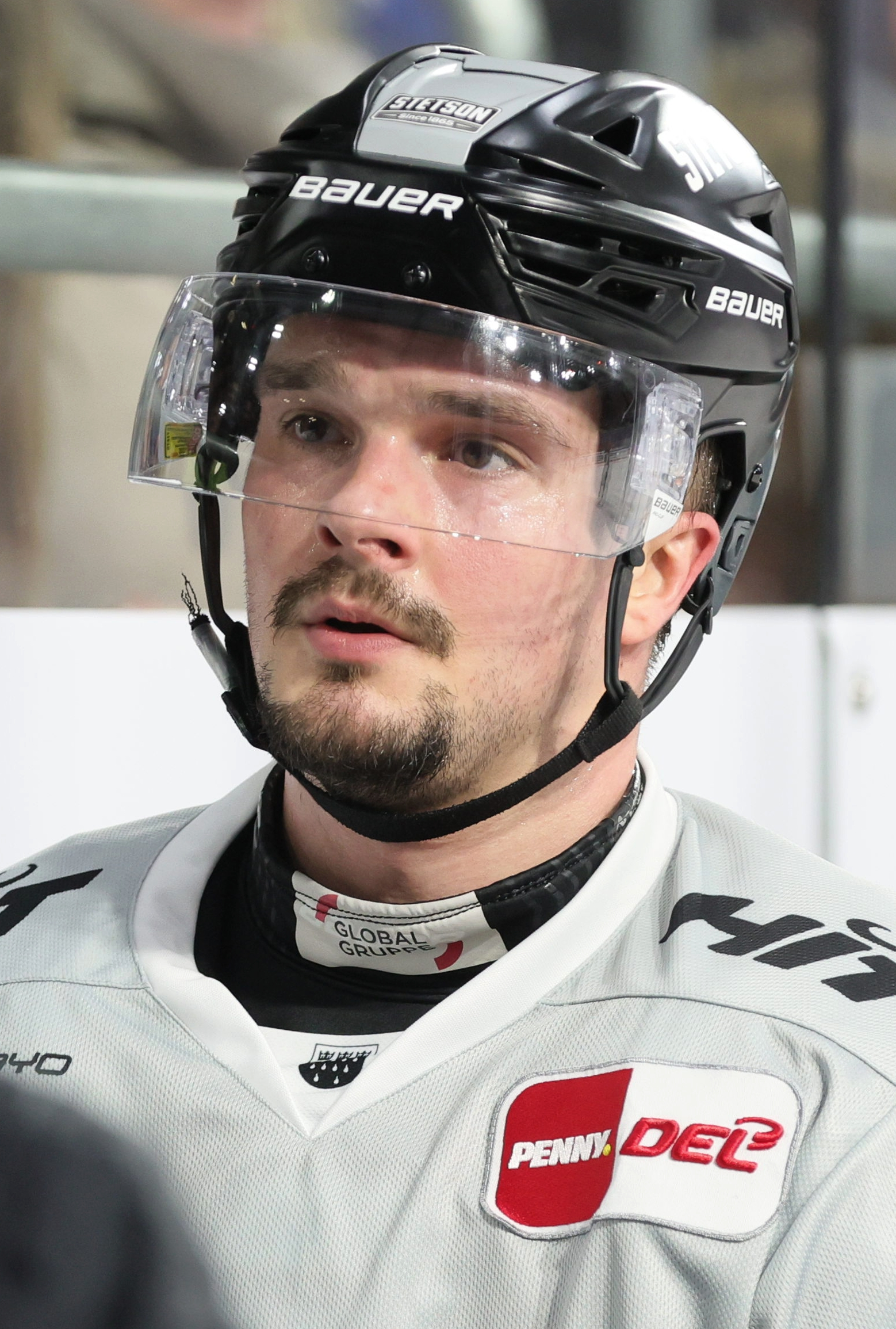
- Rantakari, 2025
- Born: November 19, 1993 (age 32) Espoo, Finland
- Height: 6 ft 0 in (183 cm)
- Weight: 176 lb (80 kg; 12 st 8 lb)
- Position: Defence
- Shoots: Right
- Mestis team Former teams: Jokerit; Kiekko-Vantaa; Espoo Blues; Modo Hockey; Tappara; HC Davos; EHC Biel; Neftekhimik Nizhnekamsk; HC Fribourg-Gottéron; HIFK; Augsburger Panther; Sport; Kölner Haie; Lahti Pelicans
- Playing career: 2012–present

Otso Rantakari (born November 19, 1993) is a Finnish professional ice hockey defenceman who is currently playing with Jokerit of the Mestis.

== Playing career ==
Rantakari made his Liiga debut playing with Espoo Blues during the 2014–15 Liiga season.

On September 9, 2019, Rantakari was signed to a four-month tryout by HC Davos of the Swiss National League (NL) through December 31, 2019. On November 30, 2019, Rantakari was signed to a one-year contract by Davos through the end of the 2019/20 season. On January 21, 2020, Rantakari was loaned to EHC Biel to replace injured Anssi Salmela.

On 18 June 2020, Rantakari left Switzerland as a free agent and agreed to a one-year deal with Russian club, HC Neftekhimik Nizhnekamsk of the Kontinental Hockey League (KHL).
