= Kristian Kuusela =

Finnish ice hockey player

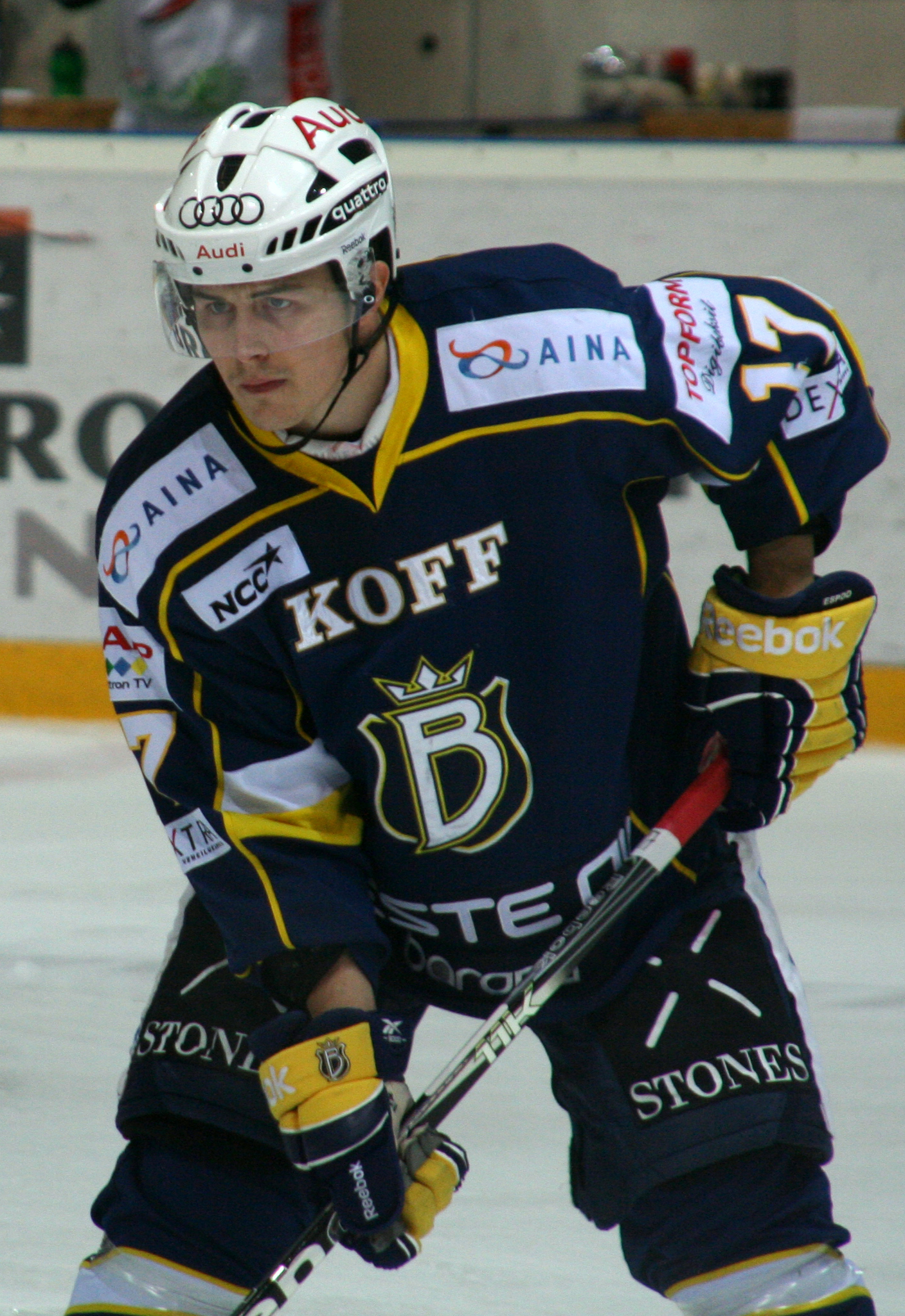
- Born: 19 February 1983 (age 43) Seinäjoki, Finland
- Height: 5 ft 9 in (175 cm)
- Weight: 201 lb (91 kg; 14 st 5 lb)
- Position: Right wing
- Shot: Right
- Played for: Ässät; Modo Hockey; Kärpät; Espoo Blues; Amur Khabarovsk; Tappara
- National team: Finland
- Playing career: 2002–2023

Medal record

Ice hockey

Representing Finland

World Championships
Gold medal – first place	2019 Slovakia	

Kristian Kuusela (born 19 February 1983) is a Finnish former professional ice hockey right wing. Kuusela announced his retirement on 27 April 2023 after winning the Liiga championship with Tappara. Kuusela played a total of 1107 regular season games with 738 points. During his Liiga career Kuusela represented Ässät, Kärpät, Blues and Tappara. Foreign clubs Kuusela represented were MODO Hockey from Sweden and Amur Khabarovsk from Russia.

== Awards ==
- Swedish Champion with Modo Hockey: 2006–07.
- Finnish Champion with 4x Tappara and 1x Kärpät: 2007–08, 2015–16, 2016–17, 2021–22, 2022–23.
- Liiga Runners-up with 1x Ässät, 1x Kärpät and 3x Tappara: 2005–06, 2008–09, 2013–14, 2014–15, 2017–18.
- Lasse Oksanen trophy: 2015–16
- Veli-Pekka Ketola trophy: 2015–16
- Kultainen kypärä: 2015–16
- CHL Champion with Tappara : 2022–23
- Gold medal at the Ice Hockey World Championships: 2019

== Career statistics ==
=== Regular season and playoffs ===
			Regular season					Playoffs
Season	Team	League	GP	G	A	Pts	PIM	GP	G	A	Pts	PIM
1998–99	Tappara	FIN U18	21	15	10	25	8	—	—	—	—	—
1999–2000	Tappara	FIN U18	17	9	12	21	6	—	—	—	—	—
1999–2000	Tappara	FIN U20	27	7	8	15	35	6	1	0	1	2
2000–01	Tappara	FIN U18	3	2	2	4	4	—	—	—	—	—
2000–01	Tappara	FIN U20	41	16	30	46	36	9	2	0	2	6
2001–02	Tappara	FIN U20	40	11	19	30	44	2	1	1	2	2
2001–02	FPS	Mestis	4	0	0	0	0	—	—	—	—	—
2002–03	Ässät	FIN U20	26	6	19	25	49	—	—	—	—	—
2002–03	Ässät	SM-l	31	3	0	3	2	—	—	—	—	—
2003–04	Ässät	FIN U20	10	8	6	14	6	—	—	—	—	—
2003–04	Ässät	SM-l	53	4	6	10	12	—	—	—	—	—
2004–05	Ässät	SM-l	55	7	12	19	14	2	0	0	0	0
2005–06	Ässät	SM-l	56	26	17	43	40	14	6	3	9	12
2006–07	Ässät	SM-l	44	16	20	36	26	—	—	—	—	—
2006–07	Modo Hockey	SEL	11	2	4	6	8	20	8	5	13	14
2007–08	Kärpät	SM-l	56	18	27	45	26	15	2	6	8	0
2008–09	Kärpät	SM-l	57	23	20	43	63	15	6	3	9	10
2009–10	Kärpät	SM-l	55	16	16	32	84	10	0	2	2	6
2010–11	Kärpät	SM-l	59	11	17	28	30	3	1	1	2	0
2011–12	Blues	SM-l	60	16	17	33	14	16	3	8	11	8
2012–13	Blues	SM-l	59	10	30	40	30	—	—	—	—	—
2013–14	Tappara	Liiga	60	19	27	46	28	20	4	9	13	8
2014–15	Tappara	Liiga	60	14	32	46	10	20	6	12	18	0
2015–16	Tappara	Liiga	56	20	39	59	14	17	5	10	15	6
2016–17	Amur Khabarovsk	KHL	52	7	14	21	18	—	—	—	—	—
2016–17	Tappara	Liiga	10	1	3	4	0	18	5	4	9	6
2017–18	Tappara	Liiga	60	12	32	44	12	16	4	7	11	16
2018–19	Tappara	Liiga	60	19	35	54	16	11	4	5	9	4
2019–20	Tappara	Liiga	55	20	33	53	16	—	—	—	—	—
SM-l/Liiga totals			946	255	383	638	437	177	46	70	116	76

=== International ===
Year	Team	Event	GP	G	A	Pts	PIM
2000	Finland	U17	2	2	0	2	0
2019	Finland	WC	7	1	1	2	0
