= Elmer Söderblom =

Swedish ice hockey player (born 2001)

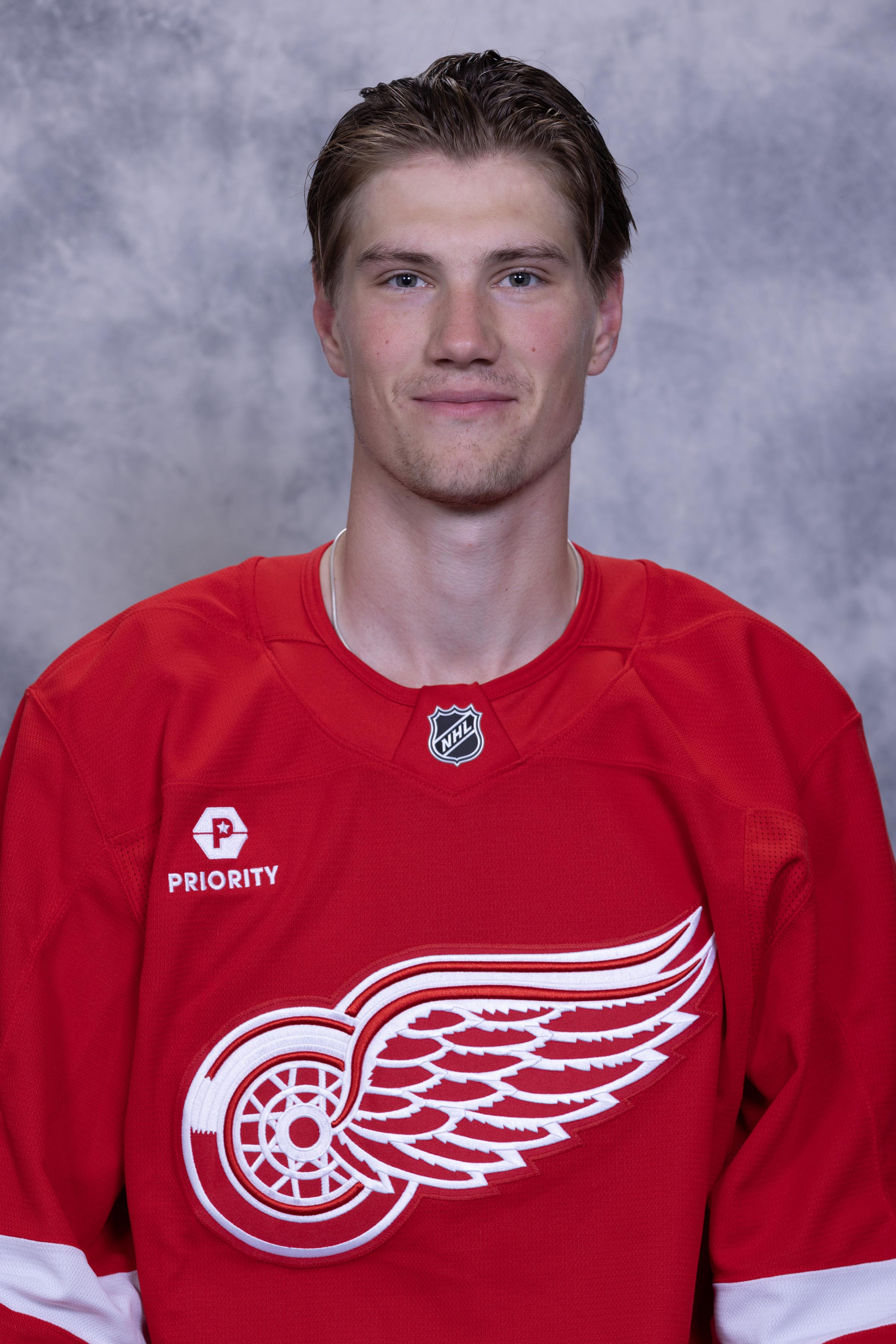
- Söderblom in 2024 with the Detroit Red Wings
- Born: 5 July 2001 (age 25) Gothenburg, Sweden
- Height: 6 ft 8 in (203 cm)
- Weight: 250 lb (113 kg; 17 st 12 lb)
- Position: Left wing
- Shoots: Left
- NHL team Former teams: Pittsburgh Penguins; Frölunda HC; Detroit Red Wings
- NHL draft: 159th overall, 2019; Detroit Red Wings
- Playing career: 2019–present

Elmer Söderblom (born 5 July 2001) is a Swedish professional ice hockey player who is a left winger for the Pittsburgh Penguins of the National Hockey League (NHL). Söderblom was drafted 159th overall by the Detroit Red Wings in the 2019 NHL entry draft.

== Playing career ==
During the 2019–20 season, he led Frölunda HC J20 in scoring with 55 points and 29 goals in 36 games. Söderblom made his professional debut for Frölunda HC of the SHL during the 2019–20 season, where he appeared in 10 games while on loan. During the 2020–21 season, he recorded three goals and two assists in 28 games for Frölunda.

On 9 June 2022, Söderblom was signed by the Detroit Red Wings to a three-year, entry-level contract. On 14 October 2022, Söderblom scored his first career NHL goal in the third period against Jake Allen of the Montreal Canadiens in his NHL debut. His first goal was the game-winner and earned him the first star of the game.

During the 2023–24 season, in his first full season with the Grand Rapids Griffins, he recorded 13 goals and 16 assists in 61 regular season games, and one goal and one assist in seven games during the 2024 Calder Cup playoffs. He set career highs in games played (61), goals (13), assists (16), points (29), power play goals (3), game-winning goals (3), and shots (114). On 21 January 2025, Söderblom was recalled by the Red Wings. Before being recalled, he recorded five goals and 12 assists in 38 games for the Griffins. During the 2024–25 season, he recorded four goals and seven assists in 26 games with the Red Wings. On 2 July 2025, he signed a two-year contract extension with the Red Wings.

On 6 March 2026, unable to secure a full-time roster spot with the Red Wings, Söderblom was traded to the Pittsburgh Penguins in exchange for a 2026 third-round pick. He scored his first goal as a Penguin ten days later, in his third game with the team, in a 7–2 victory over the Colorado Avalanche. The game also became his first multi-point game with the Penguins, as he would score an assist later in the contest.

== International play ==
Medal record

Representing Sweden

Ice hockey

World U18 Championships
Gold medal – first place	2019 Sweden	

Söderblom represented Sweden at the 2021 World Junior Ice Hockey Championships.

== Personal life ==
Elmer's older brother, Arvid, is a professional ice hockey goaltender for the Hartford Wolf Pack of the NHL.

== Career statistics ==
=== Regular season and playoffs ===
			Regular season					Playoffs
Season	Team	League	GP	G	A	Pts	PIM	GP	G	A	Pts	PIM
2017–18	Frölunda HC	J20	3	0	0	0	0	—	—	—	—	—
2018–19	Frölunda HC	J20	44	9	8	17	12	—	—	—	—	—
2019–20	Frölunda HC	J20	36	29	26	55	10	—	—	—	—	—
2019–20	Frölunda HC	SHL	10	0	0	0	2	—	—	—	—	—
2019–20	Tingsryds AIF	HA	5	0	0	0	4	—	—	—	—	—
2020–21	Frölunda HC	J20	4	2	2	4	0	—	—	—	—	—
2020–21	Frölunda HC	SHL	28	3	2	5	2	1	0	0	0	0
2021–22	Frölunda HC	SHL	52	21	12	33	10	9	3	3	6	0
2022–23	Detroit Red Wings	NHL	21	5	3	8	8	—	—	—	—	—
2022–23	Grand Rapids Griffins	AHL	20	5	3	8	10	—	—	—	—	—
2023–24	Grand Rapids Griffins	AHL	61	13	16	29	8	7	1	1	2	2
2024–25	Detroit Red Wings	NHL	26	4	7	11	6	—	—	—	—	—
2024–25	Grand Rapids Griffins	AHL	38	5	12	17	29	3	0	0	0	0
2025–26	Detroit Red Wings	NHL	39	2	1	3	12	—	—	—	—	—
2025–26	Pittsburgh Penguins	NHL	20	5	5	10	11	5	1	0	1	0
SHL totals			90	24	14	38	14	10	3	3	6	0
NHL totals			106	16	16	32	37	5	1	0	1	0

=== International ===
Year	Team	Event	Result	GP	G	A	Pts	PIM
2017	Sweden	WHC-17	8th	5	1	0	1	0
2018	Sweden	IH18	2nd place, silver medalist(s)	5	1	2	3	0
2019	Sweden	U18	1st place, gold medalist(s)	7	1	0	1	0
2021	Sweden	WJC	5th	5	2	1	3	0
Junior totals				22	5	3	8	0
