= Stefan Elliott =

Canadian ice hockey player (born 1991)

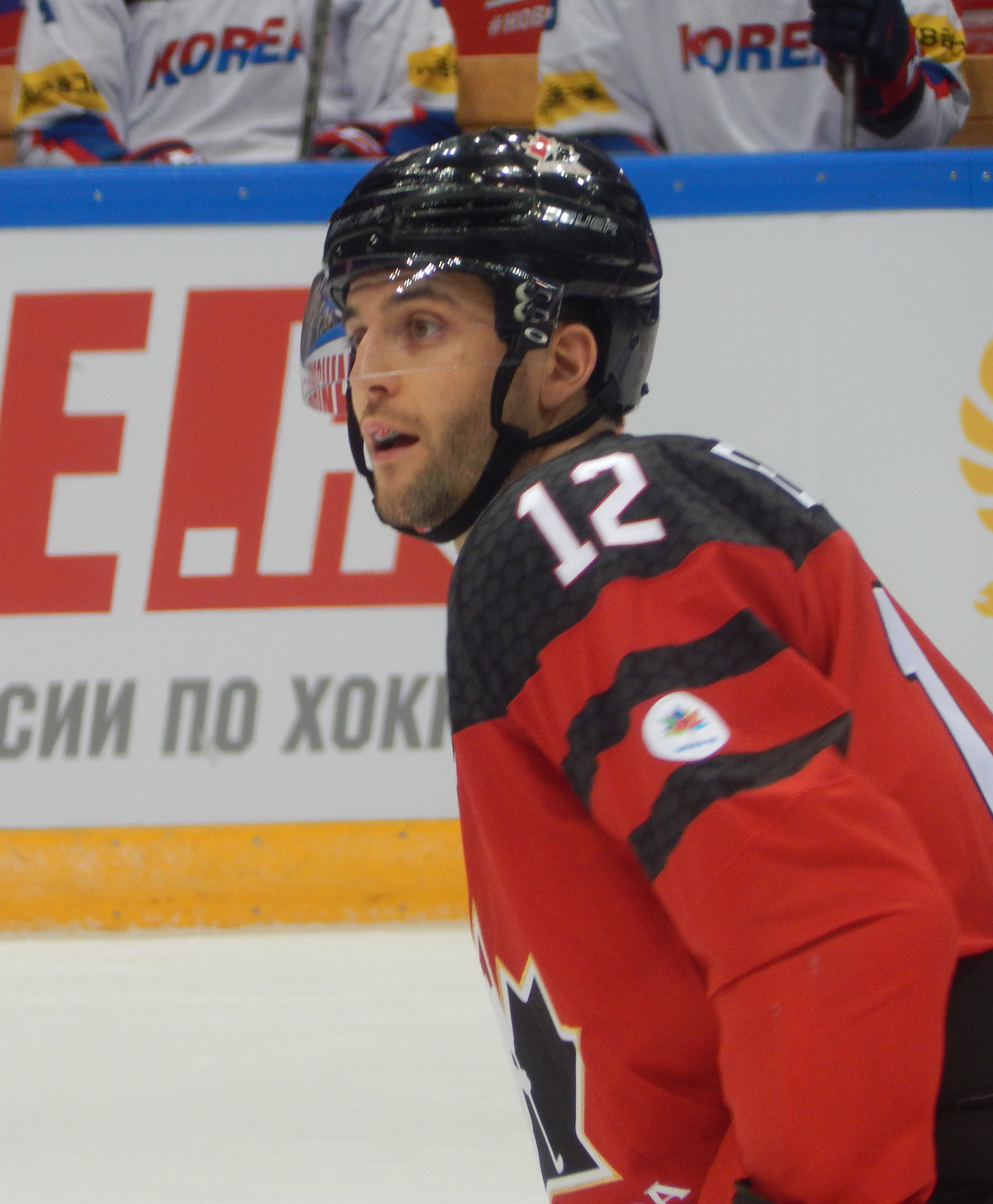
- Born: January 30, 1991 (age 35) Vancouver, British Columbia, Canada
- Height: 6 ft 1 in (185 cm)
- Weight: 191 lb (87 kg; 13 st 9 lb)
- Position: Defence
- Shot: Right
- Played for: Colorado Avalanche; Arizona Coyotes; Nashville Predators; Ak Bars Kazan; HV71; Ottawa Senators; Dinamo Minsk; Frölunda HC
- National team: Canada
- NHL draft: 49th overall, 2009; Colorado Avalanche
- Playing career: 2011–2023

Stefan Elliott (born January 30, 1991) is a Canadian former professional ice hockey defenceman who played in the National Hockey League (NHL).

== Playing career ==
As a youth, he played in the 2003 and 2004 Quebec International Pee-Wee Hockey Tournaments with a minor ice hockey team from North Vancouver.

Elliott first played junior hockey with the Vancouver North West Giants in the BC Major Midget League, before moving on the Saskatoon Blades of the Western Hockey League. In his first full season with the Blades in 2007–08, Elliott led the defense with 31 assists and 40 points.

In the following 2008–09 season, Elliott's offensive prowess improved to again lead the Blades defense with 15 goals and 55 points. Elliott's intelligence on ice was matched off ice as he was awarded the WHL's and the CHL's Scholastic Player of the Year award. Eligible for the 2009 NHL entry draft, he was selected in the second round, 49th overall, by the Colorado Avalanche.

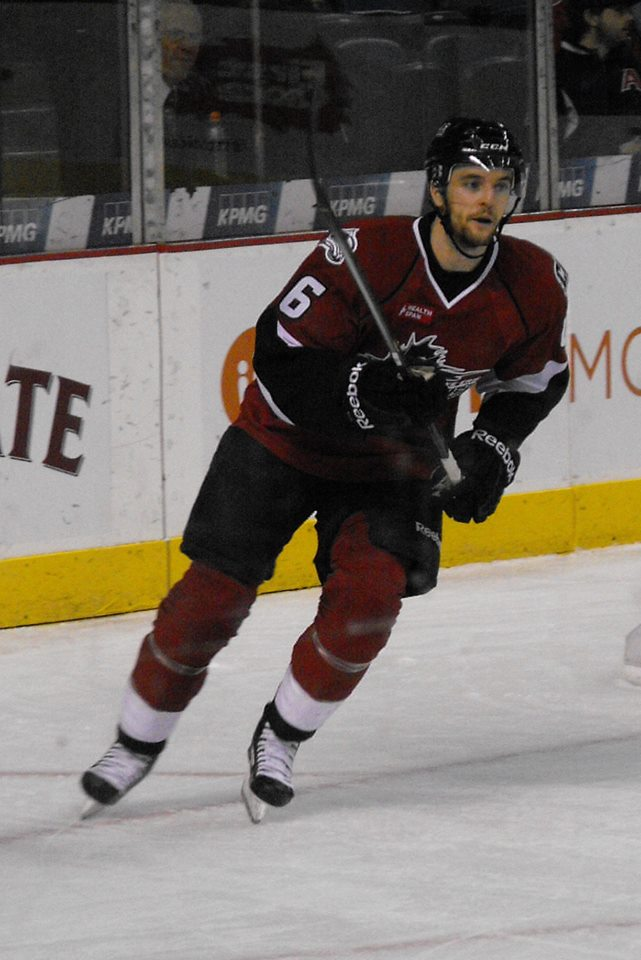
Elliott during his tenure with the Monsters.

On March 21, 2011, Elliott was signed by the Avalanche to a three-year entry-level contract. On April 16, 2011, Elliott was assigned to join the playoff run of the Avalanche's American Hockey League affiliate, the Lake Erie Monsters, on an amateur tryout. In his first full professional season in 2011–12 Elliot was recalled from the Monsters by the Avalanche on November 25, 2011. The following day on November 26, 2011, Elliott scored his first goal in his NHL debut against Devan Dubnyk of the Edmonton Oilers, which proved to be the game winner.

Entering his fourth professional season, Elliott was placed on waivers by the Avalanche on September 29, 2014 before he was reassigned to the Monsters to begin the 2014–15 campaign. Elliott assumed top pairing responsibilities with the Monsters and responded by leading the club in scoring from the blueline, scoring a franchise high 19 goals with 40 points in 64 games. Elliott was the Monsters selection to the AHL All-Star Game and was recalled by the Avalanche to appear in 5 scoreless games.

As a restricted free agent in the off-season, and unable to secure an NHL role with the Avalanche, on September 9, 2015, his rights were traded to the Arizona Coyotes in exchange for Brandon Gormley. On September 18, 2015, Elliott agreed to a one-year, two-way contract with the Coyotes. In the 2015–16 season, Elliott played 19 games with Arizona before he was placed on waivers by the Coyotes on January 14, 2016. After going unclaimed, Elliott was traded the following day to the Nashville Predators for defenceman Victor Bartley. He was immediately assigned to AHL affiliate, the Milwaukee Admirals.

As a restricted free agent in the off-season with the Predators, Elliott opted to pause his NHL career and with the 2016–17 season underway he signed his first contract abroad on a one-year deal with Ak Bars Kazan of the Kontinental Hockey League on September 29, 2016. In his lone season with Ak Bars, Elliott appeared in 31 regular season contests in registering 4 goals and 11 points.

Unable to perform to heightened expectations with Ak Bars, Elliott left as a free agent at the conclusion of his contract. Midway into the 2017–18 season, Elliott agreed to join Swedish outfit, HV71 of the Swedish Hockey League, for the remainder of the campaign on October 21, 2017. Elliott adapted quickly to the Swedish style, and became a relied upon presence on the blueline for HV71. In 34 games his contributed offensively with 4 goals and 21 points.

In the following off-season, Elliott opted for a return to the NHL in securing as a free agent a one-year, two-way contract with the Pittsburgh Penguins on July 1, 2018. On December 5, Elliott and Tobias Lindberg were traded to the Ottawa Senators in exchange for Ben Sexton and Macoy Erkamps. Both players were immediately assigned to the Senators' AHL affiliate, the Belleville Senators. During the 2018–19 season, Elliott was recalled by the Senators and for the first time since 2016 appeared in 3 NHL games, posting 1 assist. In his tenure with Belleville, Elliott contributed with 20 points in 44 games.

As an impending free agent, Elliott ventured abroad, returning to the KHL in signing a one-year contract with Belarusian club, HC Dinamo Minsk, on June 25, 2019. Elliott featured in just 18 games over the course of the 2019–20 season, collecting 2 goals and 8 points. Elliott continued his journeyman European career, returning for a second tenure in Sweden in accepting a one-year contract with Frölunda HC of the SHL on May 1, 2020.

== International play ==
Medal record

Representing Canada

Ice hockey

Olympic Games
| Bronze medal – third place | 2018 Pyeongchang | |

Elliott first featured in an international tournament at the major junior level, selected to Canada Pacific at the 2008 World U-17 Hockey Challenge. He would feature with Canada at the 2008 Ivan Hlinka Memorial Tournament before competing in his first full IIHF competition at the 2009 IIHF World U18 Championships.

During the 2017–18 SHL season, Elliott was selected to represent Canada at the 2018 Winter Olympics in Pyeongchang, South Korea. Used in a depth role, Elliott appeared in two games as Canada claimed the Bronze medal.

== Career statistics ==
=== Regular season and playoffs ===
| | | | Regular season | | | | | Playoffs |
| Season | Team | League | GP | G | A | Pts | PIM | GP | G | A | Pts | PIM |
|---|---|---|---|---|---|---|---|---|---|---|---|---|
| 2006–07 | Vancouver NW Giants AAA | BCMM | 36 | 12 | 19 | 31 | 18 | — | — | — | — | — |
| 2006–07 | Saskatoon Blades | WHL | 1 | 0 | 0 | 0 | 0 | — | — | — | — | — |
| 2007–08 | Saskatoon Blades | WHL | 67 | 9 | 31 | 40 | 17 | — | — | — | — | — |
| 2008–09 | Saskatoon Blades | WHL | 71 | 16 | 39 | 55 | 26 | 7 | 1 | 3 | 4 | 4 |
| 2009–10 | Saskatoon Blades | WHL | 72 | 26 | 39 | 65 | 24 | 10 | 3 | 5 | 8 | 4 |
| 2010–11 | Saskatoon Blades | WHL | 71 | 31 | 50 | 81 | 14 | 10 | 3 | 5 | 8 | 0 |
| 2010–11 | Lake Erie Monsters | AHL | — | — | — | — | — | 5 | 0 | 2 | 2 | 0 |
| 2011–12 | Lake Erie Monsters | AHL | 30 | 5 | 9 | 14 | 4 | — | — | — | — | — |
| 2011–12 | Colorado Avalanche | NHL | 39 | 4 | 9 | 13 | 8 | — | — | — | — | — |
| 2012–13 | Lake Erie Monsters | AHL | 44 | 5 | 8 | 13 | 6 | — | — | — | — | — |
| 2012–13 | Colorado Avalanche | NHL | 18 | 1 | 3 | 4 | 2 | — | — | — | — | — |
| 2013–14 | Lake Erie Monsters | AHL | 61 | 14 | 14 | 28 | 14 | — | — | — | — | — |
| 2013–14 | Colorado Avalanche | NHL | 1 | 1 | 0 | 1 | 0 | — | — | — | — | — |
| 2014–15 | Lake Erie Monsters | AHL | 64 | 19 | 21 | 40 | 22 | — | — | — | — | — |
| 2014–15 | Colorado Avalanche | NHL | 5 | 0 | 0 | 0 | 2 | — | — | — | — | — |
| 2015–16 | Arizona Coyotes | NHL | 19 | 2 | 4 | 6 | 4 | — | — | — | — | — |
| 2015–16 | Milwaukee Admirals | AHL | 35 | 8 | 11 | 19 | 14 | 3 | 0 | 1 | 1 | 2 |
| 2015–16 | Nashville Predators | NHL | 2 | 0 | 0 | 0 | 0 | — | — | — | — | — |
| 2016–17 | Ak Bars Kazan | KHL | 31 | 4 | 7 | 11 | 12 | 1 | 0 | 0 | 0 | 0 |
| 2017–18 | HV71 | SHL | 34 | 4 | 17 | 21 | 14 | 2 | 0 | 0 | 0 | 2 |
| 2018–19 | Wilkes–Barre/Scranton Penguins | AHL | 20 | 1 | 7 | 8 | 4 | — | — | — | — | — |
| 2018–19 | Belleville Senators | AHL | 44 | 6 | 14 | 20 | 8 | — | — | — | — | — |
| 2018–19 | Ottawa Senators | NHL | 3 | 0 | 1 | 1 | 0 | — | — | — | — | — |
| 2019–20 | Dinamo Minsk | KHL | 18 | 2 | 6 | 8 | 6 | — | — | — | — | — |
| 2020–21 | Frölunda HC | SHL | 45 | 8 | 12 | 20 | 14 | 7 | 1 | 0 | 1 | 2 |
| 2021–22 | Frölunda HC | SHL | 47 | 5 | 8 | 13 | 10 | 9 | 2 | 0 | 2 | 0 |
| 2022–23 | Djurgårdens IF | Allsv | 38 | 8 | 13 | 21 | 14 | 17 | 3 | 6 | 9 | 4 |
| NHL totals | | | 87 | 8 | 17 | 25 | 16 | — | — | — | — | — |

=== International ===
| Year | Team | Event | Result | GP | G | A | Pts | PIM |
|---|---|---|---|---|---|---|---|---|
| 2008 | Canada Pacific | U17 | 4th | 6 | 0 | 0 | 0 | 0 |
| 2008 | Canada | IH18 | 1st place, gold medalist(s) | 4 | 0 | 2 | 2 | 0 |
| 2009 | Canada | WJC18 | 4th | 6 | 0 | 2 | 2 | 0 |
| 2018 | Canada | OG | 3rd place, bronze medalist(s) | 2 | 0 | 0 | 0 | 0 |
| Junior totals | | | | 16 | 0 | 4 | 4 | 0 |
| Senior totals | | | | 2 | 0 | 0 | 0 | 0 |

== Awards and honours ==
| Award | Year |
WHL
| Daryl K. (Doc) Seaman Trophy | 2008–09 |
| CHL Scholastic Player of the Year | 2008–09 |
| East First All-Star Team | 2010–11 |
| Bill Hunter Memorial Trophy | 2010–11 |
| WHL Plus-Minus Award | 2010–11 |
