= Samuel Johannesson =

Swedish ice hockey player (born 2000)

- Born: 27 December 2000 (age 25) Halmstad, Sweden
- Height: 5 ft 11 in (180 cm)
- Weight: 176 lb (80 kg; 12 st 8 lb)
- Position: Defence
- Shoots: Right
- SHL team Former teams: Frölunda HC; Rögle BK; Brynäs IF; Örebro HK
- NHL draft: 176th overall, 2020; Columbus Blue Jackets
- Playing career: 2019–present

Samuel Johannesson (born 27 December 2000) is a Swedish professional ice hockey defenceman for Frölunda HC of the Swedish Hockey League (SHL). He was drafted by the Columbus Blue Jackets in the 6th round of the 2020 NHL entry draft with the 176th overall pick.

== Playing career ==
Johannesson made his SHL debut with Rögle BK in the 2018–19 season. Following the 2021–22 season, Johannesson left Rögle BK, signing a two-year contract with fellow SHL club, Brynäs IF, on 4 May 2022. After Brynäs were relegated to HockeyAllsvenskan in 2023, Johannesson opted to remain in the SHL and was signed by Örebro HK to a two-year contract beginning in the 2023–24 season.

After establishing a new career high with 11 goals from the blueline and posting 27 points through 47 regular season games with Örebro HK, Johannesson was signed to a two-year, entry-level contract with the St. Louis Blues of the National Hockey League (NHL) on 30 April 2024.

In the midst of his second year in North America and during the 2025–26 season, having featured exclusively with the Blues AHL affiliate, the Springfield Thunderbirds, Johannesson was placed on unconditional waivers for purpose of a mutual termination of his contract with Blues on 4 February 2026. Immediately returning to Sweden, Johannesson agreed to a contract through 2028 with SHL outfit, Frölunda HC, on 5 February 2026.

== Career statistics ==
			Regular season					Playoffs
Season	Team	League	GP	G	A	Pts	PIM	GP	G	A	Pts	PIM
2016–17	Rögle BK	J18	21	2	3	5	8	—	—	—	—	—
2017–18	Rögle BK	J18	16	7	12	19	4	—	—	—	—	—
2017–18	Rögle BK	J20	14	4	2	6	8	—	—	—	—	—
2018–19	Rögle BK	J20	41	3	13	16	8	2	0	2	2	0
2018–19	Rögle BK	SHL	7	0	0	0	0	1	0	0	0	0
2018–19	Kristianstads IK	Div.1	1	0	0	0	0	—	—	—	—	—
2018–19	Helsingsborgs HC	Div.1	2	0	1	1	0	—	—	—	—	—
2019–20	Rögle BK	J20	19	8	10	18	0	—	—	—	—	—
2019–20	Rögle BK	SHL	44	1	10	11	2	—	—	—	—	—
2020–21	Rögle BK	SHL	45	1	3	4	6	6	0	0	0	0
2020–21	Kristianstads IK	Allsv	8	2	3	5	0	—	—	—	—	—
2021–22	Rögle BK	SHL	48	1	6	7	2	10	0	0	0	0
2022–23	Brynäs IF	SHL	52	8	24	32	8	—	—	—	—	—
2023–24	Örebro HK	SHL	43	11	16	27	10	3	1	0	1	0
2024–25	Springfield Thunderbirds	AHL	66	5	27	32	6	3	0	0	0	0
2025–26	Springfield Thunderbirds	AHL	26	2	9	11	8	—	—	—	—	—
2025–26	Frölunda HC	SHL	11	2	2	4	4	6	0	0	0	0
SHL totals			250	24	61	85	32	26	1	0	1	0
AHL totals			92	7	36	43	14	3	0	0	0	0
