= Samuli Piipponen =

Finnish ice hockey defenceman

- Born: February 13, 1993 (age 32); Helsinki, Finland
- Height: 6 ft 4 in (193 cm)
- Weight: 201 lb (91 kg; 14 st 5 lb)
- Position: Defence
- Shoots: Left
- Liiga team Former teams: Lukko; SaiPa; Jukurit
- Playing career: 2013–present

Samuli Piipponen (born February 13, 1993) is a Finnish professional ice hockey defenceman currently playing for Lukko of the Liiga.

Piipponen made his Liiga debut for SaiPa during the 2013–14 season, playing seven games and scoring one goal and two assists. He signed for Jukurit of Mestis the following season, who were then granted membership to Liiga in 2016 to replace Blues after they folded due to bankruptcy.
